= 2026 Aurora Borealis Cup playoffs =

Finnish Championship ice hockey tournament edition

Auroraliigan pudotuspelit 2026 (Finnish) 2026 Auroraliiga playoffs

Tournament details
- Dates: 28 February 2026 – 8 April 2026
- Format: Best-of
- Teams: 8

Final positions
- Champions: Kiekko-Espoo (18th title)
- Runners-up: HPK Hämeenlinna
- Third place: Ilves Tampere
- Fourth place: IFK Helsinki

Tournament statistics
- Games played: 32
- Goals scored: 172 (5.38 per game)
- Attendance: 5,421 (169 per game)
- Scoring leader(s): Emma Nuutinen (25 pts)
- All statistics correct as of 8 April 2026.

The 2026 Aurora Borealis Cup playoffs or the 2026 Auroraliiga playoffs (Finnish: Auroraliigan pudotuspelit 2026) is the playoff tournament for the 2025–26 season of the Auroraliiga. The tournament began on 28 February and the Aurora Borealis Cup was awarded to Kiekko-Espoo on 8 April.

Entering the playoffs, Kiekko-Espoo, the 2025 Aurora Borealis Cup champions, were the favorites for the 2026 Aurora Borealis Cup.

== Bracket ==
As of 8 April 2026

Quarterfinals
1	Kiekko-Espoo	6	9	5	–	–	3
8	KalPa Kuopio	1	1	1	–	–	0
4	Team Kuortane	1	1	2	–	–	0
5	Ilves Tampere	3	4	5	–	–	3
2	HPK Hämeenlinna	2	5	6	4	–	3
7	Kärpät Oulu	4	1	1	1	–	1
3	IFK Helsinki	4	4	1	2	–	3
6	TPS Turku	3	3	3	0	–	1

Semifinals
Kiekko-Espoo	5	4	5	3	–	–	–	4
Ilves Tampere	4	0	2	2	–	–	–	0
HPK Hämeenlinna	1	3	4	2	5	0	1	4
IFK Helsinki	2	2	1	3	1	4	0	3

Finals
1st place, gold medalist(s)	Kiekko-Espoo	5	2	2	2	3	5	–	4
2nd place, silver medalist(s)	HPK Hämeenlinna	2	1	4	3	2	1	–	2
Bronze medal game
3rd place, bronze medalist(s)	Ilves Tampere	5
4	IFK Helsinki	2

== Quarterfinals ==
The top eight teams from the regular season qualified for the best-of-five quarterfinals (Finnish: puolivälierät). It began on Saturday, 28 February and concluded on Saturday, 7 March.

Each series alternated venue on a per-game basis, with home ice advantage granted to the higher seeded team for the first, third, and potential fifth game. Due to the substantial distance between HPK and Kärpät's home venues, the teams were scheduled to play back-to-back games at each venue rather than alternating on a per-game basis. HPK was granted home ice advantage for the first, second, and potential fifth game.

All times local, Eastern European Time (UTC+2)

=== (1) K-Espoo vs. (8) KalPa ===
Abbreviations: PP = Power play goal (+1 advantage); SH = Short handed goal (–1 advantage)

28 February 2026; 17:00	Kiekko-Espoo	6–1 (3–1, 1–0, 2–0)	KalPa Kuopio	Tapiola 2, Espoo; Attendance: 102

Minja Drufva
Goalies
Salla Sivula
Annika Saastamoinen
Referee:
Reetta-Kaisa Lusi
Linesmen:
Aleksis Koistinen
Fanny Jalonen

Yrjänen (Järvinen, Talvitie) – 01:49	1–0
	1–1	02:26 – Kärkkäinen (Sano)
Koskipalo (Katajamäki, Valkjärvi) – 08:34	2–1
Haukijärvi (Valkjärvi, Yrjänen) – 16:10	3–1
Yrjänen (Täks) – 38:13	4–1
Nuutinen (Täks, Montonen) – 42:59	5–1
Nuutinen (Montonen, Eronen) – PP – 49:07	6–1

6 min
Penalties
10 min
56
Shots
12

1 March 2026; 15:00	KalPa Kuopio	1–9 (1–6, 0–2, 0–1)	Kiekko-Espoo	Niirala, Kuopio; Attendance: 121

Annika Saastamoinen
Goalies
Tiia Pajarinen
Referee:
Veera Lyytikäinen
Linesmen:
Anni Kankkunen
Miia Partanen

	0–1	01:24 – PP – Haukijärvi (Nuutinen, Yrjänen)
	0–2	05:36 – PP – Toivonen (Valkjärvi)
	0–3	05:55 – Kemppainen (Saarni, Käyhty)
	0–4	16:13 – Yrjänen (Haukijärvi, Nuutinen)
	0–5	16:43 – Rantamäki (Nuutinen, Montonen)
	0–6	16:56 – Täks (Nuutinen, Eronen)
Pappinen (Sano) – 17:04	1–6
	1–7	29:03 – Eronen (Nuutinen, Katajamäki)
	1–8	34:57 – Kemppainen (Käyhty, Saarni)
	1–9	54:59 – SH – Nuutinen

6 min
Penalties
6 min
12
Shots
51

5 March 2026; 18:45	Kiekko-Espoo	5–1 (1–0, 2–1, 2–0)	KalPa Kuopio	Tapiola 2, Espoo; Attendance: 102

Minja Drufva
Goalies
Salla Sivula
Referee:
Salla-Maaria Raitala
Linesmen:
Helinä Anttila
Eleonoora Mikkonen

Yrjänen (Talvitie, Haukijärvi) – 17:25	1–0
Valkjärvi (Toivonen) – PP – 28:10	2–0
Täks (Nuutinen) – 32:19	3–0
	3–1	39:45 – Pohjala (Kettunen, Pappinen)
Katajamäki (Toivonen, Virtanen) – 44:19	4–1
Yrjänen (Montonen, Haukijärvi) – 52:22	5–1

0 min
Penalties
8 min
37
Shots
14

=== (2) HPK vs. (7) Kärpät ===
Abbreviations: PP = Power play goal (+1 advantage); PP2 = Power play goal (+2 advantage); EN = Empty net goal; EA = Extra attacker

28 February 2026; 16:00	HPK Hämeenlinna	2–4 (0–1, 1–1, 1–2)	Kärpät Oulu	HML hh, (Note: The Finnish Ice Hockey Association uses the abbreviation HML hh for the Hämeenlinnan harjoitushalli ('Hämeenlinna practice rink'), which is housed within the Hämeenlinna Ice Hall complex and serves as home ice for HPK.) Hämeenlinna; Attendance: 90

Anni Keisala
Goalies
Kati Asikainen
Referee:
Johanna Oksanen
Linesmen:
Taneli Niiranen
Artur Bilan

	0–1	02:29 – Ronkainen (Wäänänen)
	0–2	21:28 – PP – Pekkala (Wäänänen, Ruonakoski)
Berg (Stoltenberg, K. Seikkula) – 32:16	1–2
Saukkonen (Pelkonen, Lamberg) – 43:44	2–2
	2–3	55:14 – PP – Ruonakoski (Wäänänen, Loponen)
	2–4	59:54 – EN – Loponen (Ruonakoski)

20 min
Penalties
4 min
37
Shots
24

1 March 2026; 14:00	HPK Hämeenlinna	5–1 (1–1, 1–0, 3–0)	Kärpät Oulu	HML hh, Hämeenlinna; Attendance: 100

Anni Keisala
Goalies
Kati Asikainen
Referee:
Reetta-Kaisa Lusi
Linesmen:
Julia Halme
Eleonoora Mikkonen

Heidenberger (Lukkarila, Ahlskog) – 13:58	1–0
	1–1	15:17 – PP2 – Wäänänen (Ruonakoski, Tukainen)
Viitala (Kalová) – 27:47	2–1
Skog (Ahlskog) – 42:49	3–1
Lamberg (Mašková) – 48:25	4–1
Lamberg (Mašková) – 53:53	5–1

10 min
Penalties
8 min
52
Shots
14

5 March 2026; 18:15	Kärpät Oulu	1–6 (0–0, 0–2, 1–4)	HPK Hämeenlinna	Raksila, Oulu; Attendance: 201

Kati Asikainen
Goalies
Anni Keisala
Referee:
Krista Joki-Erkkilä
Linesmen:
Eevi Siermala
Henni Rantala

	0–1	24:53 – PP – Juříčková (Lukkarila, K. Seikkula)
	0–2	33:15 – Kalová (Kokora, Mašková)
	0–3	42:29 – Juříčková (K. Seikkula, Lukkarila)
	0–4	49:30 – Lamberg (Mašková)
Loponen (Ylitalo) – EA – 54:59	1–4
	1–5	57:51 – EN – Kalová (Kokora)
	1–6	59:47 – EN – Juříčková (Lukkarila)

6 min
Penalties
27 min
13
Shots
37

6 March 2026; 16:00	Kärpät Oulu	1–4 (1–4, 0–0, 0–0)	HPK Hämeenlinna	Raksila, Oulu; Attendance: 151

Kati Asikainen
Ronja Pätsi
Goalies
Anni Keisala
Referee:
Krista Joki-Erkkilä
Linesmen:
Henni Rantala
Eevi Siermala

	0–1	09:06 – Lamberg (Mašková, Kokora)
Ylitalo (Loponen, Pekkala) – 11:03	1–1
	1–2	11:37 – Kokora (Kalová, Lamberg)
	1–3	15:54 – Juříčková (K. Seikkula, Lukkarila)
	1–4	16:30 – Stoltenberg (Viitala, Heidenberger)

8 min
Penalties
4 min
13
Shots
42

=== (3) HIFK vs. (6) TPS ===
Abbreviations: PP = Power play goal (+1 advantage); SH = Short handed goal (–1 advantage); EN = Empty net goal

28 February 2026; 14:30	IFK Helsinki	4–3 (1–2, 2–0, 1–1)	TPS Turku	Pirkkola, Helsinki; Attendance: 110

Lilli Packalen
Goalies
Miia Vainio
Referee:
Salla-Maaria Raitala
Linesmen:
Julia Halme
Eleonoora Mikkonen

Turunen (Salonen, Vihervuori) – 04:46	1–0
	1–1	12:35 – Kortelainen (Korpela)
	1–2	19:32 – Viitala (Ilvonen, Elomaa)
Kuhta (Vilén, I. Lappalainen) – 29:01	2–2
Locatelli (Juusela) – 33:29	3–2
	3–3	54:51 – Sundman (Kortelainen, Erbenová)
E. Lappalainen – SH – 56:53	4–3

6 min
Penalties
4 min
41
Shots
16

1 March 2026; 14:30	TPS Turku	3–4 OT (2–1, 1–0, 0–2) (OT: 0–1)	IFK Helsinki	Kupittaa, Turku; Attendance: 101

Tiina Ranne
Goalies
Lilli Packalen
Referee:
Johanna Oksanen
Linesmen:
Ilona Silander
Matilda Elo

Timonen (Ilvonen, Viitala) – 01:12	1–0
Pitkäaho (Koski, Korpela) – 04:50	2–0
	2–1	06:21 – Juusela (Arhammar Pakarinen)
Timonen (Koski, Viitala) – PP – 35:36	3–1
	3–2	44:12 – Salonen (Turunen, Palin)
	3–3	48:45 – Juusela (Turunen)
	3–4	67:49 – E. Lappalainen (Suhonen, I. Lappalainen)

2 min
Penalties
4 min
26
Shots
43

4 March 2026; 19:30	IFK Helsinki	1–3 (0–1, 0–1, 1–1)	TPS Turku	Pirkkola, Helsinki; Attendance: 99

Lilli Packalen
Goalies
Miia Vainio
Referee:
Salla-Maaria Raitala
Linesmen:
Eleonoora Mikkonen
Julia Halme

	0–1	17:50 – PP – Timonen (Erbenová, Koski)
	0–2	30:56 – Mäkivaara (Koski, Pitkäaho)
E. Lappalainen (Palin, Locatelli) – 45:13	1–2
	1–3	59:56 – EN – Koski (Erbenová, Viitala)

4 min
Penalties
2 min
35
Shots
16

7 March 2026; 13:30	TPS Turku	0–2 (0–0, 0–1, 0–1)	IFK Helsinki	Kupittaa, Turku; Attendance: 97

Miia Vainio	Goalies	Lilli Packalen	Referee: Anniina Nurmi; Linesmen: Matilda Elo; Aino Ranki
0–1 / 34:20 – Turunen (Salonen); 0–2 / 59:46 – PP, EN – Salonen			Referee: Anniina Nurmi; Linesmen: Matilda Elo; Aino Ranki
32 min	Penalties	2 min	Referee: Anniina Nurmi; Linesmen: Matilda Elo; Aino Ranki
21	Shots	28	Referee: Anniina Nurmi; Linesmen: Matilda Elo; Aino Ranki

=== (4) Kuortane vs. (5) Ilves ===
Abbreviations: PP = Power play goal (+1 advantage); EN = Empty net goal

28 February 2026; 15:00	Team Kuortane	1–3 (0–2, 1–0, 0–1)	Ilves Tampere	Kuortaneen jäähalli, Kuortane; Attendance: 150

Lilia Huovinen
Goalies
Neea Pohjamo
Referee:
Krista Joki-Erkkilä
Linesmen:
Henni Rantala
Eevi Siermala

	0–1	09:57 – Suoranta (Varpula, Ekoluoma)
	0–2	14:14 – Nilsson (Jo. Juitilainen, Antti-Roiko)
Byskata (Kari, Varjonen) – 35:56	1–2
	1–3	45:41 – Antti-Roiko (Jo. Juutilainen, Nilsson)

6 min
Penalties
4 min
18
Shots
42

1 March 2026; 14:30	Ilves Tampere	4–1 (2–0, 0–1, 2–0)	Team Kuortane	Tesoma 1, Tampere; Attendance: 140

Neea Pohjamo
Goalies
Kerttu Kuja-Halkola
Referee:
Anniina Nurmi
Linesmen:
Aino Ranki
Niklas Sahakangas

Siira (Kuusisto, Varpula) – PP – 09:32	1–0
Suoranta (Ekoluoma, Siira) – PP – 12:35	2–0
	2–1	23:45 – Byskata (Krook, Kari)
Mylläri (Varpula) – 42:47	3–1
Nilsson – EN – 59:09	4–1

10 min
Penalties
27 min
31
Shots
24

4 March 2026; 18:30	Team Kuortane	2–5 (1–1, 0–0, 1–4)	Ilves Tampere	Kuortaneen jäähalli, Kuortane; Attendance: 160

Lilia Huovinen
Goalies
Neea Pohjamo
Referee:
Kaisa Ketonen
Linesmen:
Matilda Elo
Niklas Sahakangas

	0–1	02:25 – Mylläri (Ekoluoma, Varpula)
Kari (Siivonen, Ojala) – 09:07	1–1
	1–2	44:37 – Melotindos (Suoranta, Varpula)
	1–3	45:55 – Antti-Roiko (Nilsson, Jo. Juutilainen)
Kari (Siivonen, Byskata) – PP – 50:33	2–3
	2–4	51:12 – PP – Ekoluoma (Varpula, Mylläri)
	2–5	56:41 – EN – Ekoluoma (Varpula)

6 min
Penalties
6 min
22
Shots
40

== Semifinals ==
The best-of-seven semifinals (Finnish: välierät) began on Wednesday, 11 March and concluded on Tuesday, 24 March. Kiekko-Espoo swept their series against Ilves and secured their return to the finals on 19 March. The series between HPK and HIFK was pushed to seven games, with HPK earning a finals berth on 24 March.

All times local, Eastern European Time (UTC+2)

=== K-Espoo vs. Ilves ===
Abbreviations: PP = Power play goal (+1 advantage); SH = Short handed goal (–1 advantage); EN = Empty net goal

11 March 2026; 19:45	Kiekko-Espoo	5–4 (1–0, 1–1, 3–3)	Ilves Tampere	Tapiola 2, Espoo; Attendance: 110

Tiia Pajarinen
Goalies
Neea Pohjamo
Referee:
Salla-Maaria Raitala
Linesmen:
Julia Halme
Helinä Anttila

Nuutinen (Montonen, Eronen) – 15:51	1–0
Valkjärvi (Nuutinen, Katajamäki) – 21:00	2–0
	2–1	38:18 – SH – Antti-Roiko (Suoranta)
Nuutinen (Montonen, Rantamäki) – 50:29	3–1
	3–2	54:34 – Varpula (Suoranta, Lehtiniemi)
Täks (Montonen, Nuutinen) – 55:56	4–2
	4–3	58:14 – Melotindos (Kuusisto, Suoranta)
Montonen (Rantamäki) – EN – 59:06	5–3
	5–4	59:39 – Suoranta (Ekoluoma)

4 min
Penalties
4 min
29
Shots
34

14 March 2026; 14:00	Ilves Tampere	0–4 (0–1, 0–0, 0–3)	Kiekko-Espoo	Tesoma 1, Tampere; Attendance: 152

Neea Pohjamo
Goalies
Tiia Pajarinen
Referee:
Johanna Oksanen
Linesmen:
Aino Ranki
Henni Rantala

0–1	12:05 – Yrjänen (Haukijärvi)
0–2	41:51 – Talvitie (Yrjänen)
0–3	47:48 – Toivonen (Katajamäki, Valkjärvi)
0–4	55:57 – EN – Haukijärvi (Yrjänen, Valkjärvi)

0 min
Penalties
2 min
23
Shots
34

15 March 2026; 16:00	Kiekko-Espoo	5–2 (1–0, 2–1, 2–1)	Ilves Tampere	Tapiola 2, Espoo; Attendance: 226

Tiia Pajarinen
Goalies
Neea Pohjamo
Referee:
Salla-Maaria Raitala
Linesmen:
Julia Halme
Eleonoora Mikkonen

Talvitie (Toivonen, Koskipalo) – 18:24	1–0
Haukijärvi (Rantamäki, Toivonen) – PP – 25:24	2–0
	2–1	32:51 – Nilsson (Makkonen, Jo. Juutilainen)
Yrjänen (Rantamäki, Eronen) – PP – 38:44	3–1
	3–2	57:08 – PP – Suoranta (Nilsson, Varpula)
Nuutinen (Eronen) – 57:47	4–2
Virtanen (Katajamäki) – EN – 59:12	5–2

16 min
Penalties
24 min
33
Shots
23

19 March 2026; 18:30	Ilves Tampere	2–3 OT (0–1, 1–1, 1–0) (OT: 0–1)	Kiekko-Espoo	Tesoma 1, Tampere; Attendance: 110

Neea Pohjamo
Goalies
Tiia Pajarinen
Referee:
Johanna Oksanen
Linesmen:
Aino Ranki
Henni Rantala

	0–1	14:29 – Talvitie (Haukijärvi, Yrjänen)
	0–2	36:47 – Montonen (Nuutinen, Valkjärvi)
Makkonen (Skořepová) – 37:16	1–2
Varpula (Ekoluoma) – 55:11	2–2
	2–3	65:44 – Yrjänen (Koskipalo)

2 min
Penalties
2 min
24
Shots
32

Kiekko-Espoo continued their winning streak in the playoffs, sweeping Ilves in the semifinals.

=== HPK vs. HIFK ===
Abbreviations: PP = Power play goal (+1 advantage); EN = Empty net goal

11 March 2026; 19:00	HPK Hämeenlinna	1–2 (1–0, 0–1, 0–1)	IFK Helsinki	Jääliikuntakeskus Hakio, (Note: The Jääliikuntakeskus Hakio ('Ice Sports Center Hakio') is situated less than 100 metres (330 ft) south of Hämeenlinna Ice Hall on Kiekkoritarinkuja ('Puck-Knight Alley').) Hämeenlinna; Attendance: 110

Anni Keisala
Goalies
Lilli Packalen
Referee:
Reetta-Kaisa Lusi
Linesmen:
Artur Bilan
Albert Tseloev

Tallinen (Juříčková, Heidenberger) – PP – 17:51	1–0
	1–1	21:26 – E. Lappalainen (Palin, Suhonen)
	1–2	59:53 – Holmberg (Locatelli)

4 min
Penalties
6 min
33
Shots
22

14 March 2026; 14:30	IFK Helsinki	2–3 GWS (1–0, 1–1, 0–1) (OT: 0–0) (GWS: 0–1)	HPK Hämeenlinna	Pirkkola, Helsinki; Attendance: 178

Lilli Packalen
Goalies
Anni Keisala
Referee:
Reetta-Kaisa Lusi
Linesmen:
Julia Halme
Helinä Anttila

Vihervuori – 08:16	1–0
	1–1	31:02 – Lukkarila (H. Seikkula)
Salonen (Juusela, Turunen) – PP – 38:04	2–1
	2–2	56:13 – Kokora (Saukkonen, Juříčková)

Salonen
Holmberg (miss)
E. Lappalainen (miss)
Juusela
Turunen (miss)
Shootout
Pelkonen
(miss) Tallinen
Juříčková
H. Seikkula
(miss) Lamberg
2 min
Penalties
2 min
35
Shots
34

15 March 2026; 16:00	HPK Hämeenlinna	4–1 (1–0, 1–0, 2–1)	IFK Helsinki	Jääliikuntakeskus Hakio, Hämeenlinna; Attendance: 221

Anni Keisala
Goalies
Janika Järvikari
Referee:
Anniina Nurmi
Linesmen:
Aino Ranki
Henni Rantala

Kalová (Kokora, Tallinen) – 19:53	1–0
Juříčková (Lamberg) – 38:23	2–0
	2–1	41:55 – PP – Locatelli (Juusela, Turunen)
K. Seikkula (Juříčková, Tallinen) – PP – 51:06	3–1
Juříčková – EN – 59:06	4–1

8 min
Penalties
10 min
21
Shots
19

19 March 2026; 18:00	IFK Helsinki	3–2 GWS (0–1, 1–0, 1–1) (OT: 0–0) (GWS: 1–0)	HPK Hämeenlinna	Pirkkola, Helsinki; Attendance: 136

Lilli Packalen
Goalies
Anni Keisala
Referee:
Reetta-Kaisa Lusi
Linesmen:
Eleonoora Mikkonen
Julia Halme

	0–1	14:56 – PP – K. Seikkula (Juříčková, Saukkonen)
Kuhta (Juusela, Locatelli) – PP – 31:36	1–1
	1–2	41:46 – Stoltenberg (H. Seikkula, Viitala)
Salonen (Juusela, Locatelli) – PP – 55:48	2–2

Salonen (miss)
E. Lappalainen
Juusela
Kylliäinen (miss)
Pere (miss)
Juusela (miss)
Salonen
Shootout
Pelkonen
Lamberg
(miss) H. Seikkula
(miss) Kalová
(miss) K. Seikkula
(miss) Lamberg
(miss) Pelkonen
6 min
Penalties
10 min
40
Shots
21

21 March 2026; 15:00	HPK Hämeenlinna	5–1 (2–0, 1–1, 2–0)	IFK Helsinki	Jääliikuntakeskus Hakio, Hämeenlinna; Attendance: 110

Anni Keisala
Goalies
Lilli Packalen
Referee:
Anniina Nurmi
Linesmen:
Aino Ranki
Ilona Silander

Lamberg (Kalová, Kokora) – 00:14	1–0
H. Seikkula (Lukkarila, K. Seikkula) – 08:53	2–0
H. Seikkula (Ahlskog, Lamberg) – 29:19	3–0
	3–1	38:13 – PP – E. Lappalainen (Holmberg, Suhonen)
Kalová – EN – 55:55	4–1
Kokora (Berg) – EN – 57:39	5–1

8 min
Penalties
2 min
21
Shots
28

22 March 2026; 15:00	IFK Helsinki	4–0 (2–0, 1–0, 1–0)	HPK Hämeenlinna	Pirkkola, Helsinki; Attendance: 144

Lilli Packalen
Goalies
Anni Keisala
Referee:
Reetta-Kaisa Lusi
Linesmen:
Julia Halme
Eleonoora Mikkonen

Salonen (Locatelli, Turunen) – 13:25	1–0
Juusela (Salonen, Suhonen) – 18:48	2–0
Turunen (Salonen, Kuhta) – PP – 35:59	3–0
Suhonen (Palin) – PP – 48:47	4–0

6 min
Penalties
4 min
22
Shots
21

24 March 2026; 18:00	HPK Hämeenlinna	1–0 (1–0, 0–0, 0–0)	IFK Helsinki	Jääliikuntakeskus Hakio, Hämeenlinna; Attendance: 150

Anni Keisala	Goalies	Lilli Packalen	Referee: Anniina Nurmi; Linesmen: Aino Ranki; Ilona Silander
Skog (Puhto) – 02:13 / 1–0			Referee: Anniina Nurmi; Linesmen: Aino Ranki; Ilona Silander
14 min	Penalties	6 min	Referee: Anniina Nurmi; Linesmen: Aino Ranki; Ilona Silander
23	Shots	27	Referee: Anniina Nurmi; Linesmen: Aino Ranki; Ilona Silander

HPK forward Barbora Juříčková sustained an ankle injury during game four of the semifinals and did not play in any subsequent semifinal games.

HPK goaltender Anni Keisala posted a 27-shot shutout in game seven of the series, assuring a return to the finals for the Hämeenlinna-based team.

== Bronze medal game ==
All times local, Eastern European Time (UTC+2)

Abbreviations: EN = Empty net goal

28 March 2026; 14:30	IFK Helsinki	2–5 (0–0, 1–4, 1–1)	Ilves Tampere	Pirkkola, Helsinki; Attendance: 193

Lilli Packalen
Goalies
Neea Pohjamo
Referee:
Salla-Maaria Raitala
Linesmen:
Eleonoora Mikkonen
Julia Halme

Salonen (Turunen, Juusela) – 20:56	1–0
	1–1	30:25 – Lehtiniemi (Suoranta)
	1–2	31:17 – Nilsson (Jo. Juutilainen, Hautala)
	1–3	32:03 – Jo. Juutilainen (Nilsson, Suoranta)
	1–4	35:04 – Jo. Juutilainen (Strömberg, Nilsson)
Vihervuori (Pere) – 52:21	2–4
	2–5	57:58 – EN – Nilsson

4 min
Penalties
2 min
28
Shots
26

== Finals ==
All times local – Eastern European Time (UTC+2) for game played 28 March, Eastern European Summer Time (UTC+3) for games played on or after 29 March

Abbreviations: PP = Power play goal (+1 advantage); SH = Short handed goal (–1 advantage); EN = Empty net goal; EA = Extra attacker; PS = Penalty shot

28 March 2026; 17:30	Kiekko-Espoo	5–2 (2–1, 1–0, 2–1)	HPK Hämeenlinna	Tapiola 2, Espoo; Attendance: 265

Tiia Pajarinen
Goalies
Anni Keisala
Referee:
Anniina Nurmi
Linesmen:
Aino Ranki
Ilona Silander

Montonen (Nuutinen) – 04:59	1–0
Virtanen (Toivonen, Katajamäki) – 06:16	2–0
	2–1	09:39 – PP – Kalová (H. Seikkula)
Haukijärvi (Yrjänen) – 23:53	3–1
Katajamäki (Rantamäki, Valkjärvi) – 50:23	4–1
	4–2	57:41 – PP EA – Pelkonen (Kokora, Kalová)
Yrjänen (Haukijärvi, Katajamäki) – PP – 59:45	5–2

8 min
Penalties
8 min
25
Shots
25

29 March 2026; 17:00	HPK Hämeenlinna	1–2 (0–0, 0–2, 1–0)	Kiekko-Espoo	Pihlajalinna Areena, Hämeenlinna; Attendance: 177

Anni Keisala
Goalies
Tiia Pajarinen
Referee:
Reetta-Kaisa Lusi
Linesmen:
Eleonoora Mikkonen
Julia Halme

	0–1	21:54 – Nuutinen
	0–2	25:21 – PP – Nuutinen (Eronen, Täks)
Lukkarila (K. Seikkula, Pelkonen) – EA – 57:57	1–2

19 min
Penalties
23 min
10
Shots
2

31 March 2026; 18:45	Kiekko-Espoo	2–4 (1–1, 0–0, 1–3)	HPK Hämeenlinna	Tapiola 2, Espoo; Attendance: 270

Tiia Pajarinen
Goalies
Anni Keisala
Referee:
Anniina Nurmi
Linesmen:
Aino Ranki
Helinä Anttila

Virtanen (Toivonen) – 02:57	1–0
	1–1	06:56 – Tillman (Lamberg)
	1–2	41:34 – Pelkonen (Lukkarila, K. Seikkula)
	1–3	52:38 – Kokora (Mašková)
Koskipalo (Toivonen, Katajamäki) – 54:16	2–3
	2–4	55:57 – Pelkonen (Ahlskog)

8 min
Penalties
4 min
27
Shots
19

3 April 2026; 16:00	HPK Hämeenlinna	3–2 (0–0, 1–2, 2–0)	Kiekko-Espoo	Pihlajalinna Areena, Hämeenlinna; Attendance: 301

Anni Keisala
Goalies
Tiia Pajarinen
Referee:
Reetta-Kaisa Lusi
Linesmen:
Eleonoora Mikkonen
Julia Halme

Viitala (Stoltenberg, Mašková) – 23:24	1–0
	1–1	25:02 – Montonen (Täks, Rantamäki)
	1–2	33:51 – PP – Nuutinen (Valkjärvi, Eronen)
Pelkonen (Lukkarila) – 40:27	2–2
Kalová (Lamberg) – 59:20	3–2

6 min
Penalties
4 min
16
Shots
24

5 April 2026; 13:30	Kiekko-Espoo	3–2 (1–0, 2–1, 0–1)	HPK Hämeenlinna	Tapiola 2, Espoo; Attendance: 375

Minja Drufva
Goalies
Anni Keisala
Referee:
Anniina Nurmi
Linesmen:
Aino Ranki
Eleonoora Mikkonen

Rantamäki – SH – 13:47	1–0
	1–1	32:11 – PP – H. Seikkula
Nuutinen – PS – 32:57	2–1
Nuutinen (Tuominen, Montonen) – 33:42	3–1
	3–2	54:52 – EA – Lamberg (Berg, Tallinen)

27 min
Penalties
10 min
33
Shots
19

8 April 2026; 18:30	HPK Hämeenlinna	1–5 (3–0, 1–0, 0–2)	Kiekko-Espoo	Pihlajalinna Areena, Hämeenlinna; Attendance: 470

Anni Keisala
Goalies
Minja Drufva
Referee:
Reetta-Kaisa Lusi
Linesmen:
Julia Halme
Eleonoora Mikkonen

	0–1	00:32 – Täks (Eronen, Nuutinen)
	0–2	09:30 – PP – Nuutinen (Rantamäki, Eronen)
	0–3	10:53 – PP – Tuominen (Nuutinen, Eronen)
Lukkarila (K. Seikkula, Pelkonen) – 27:27	1–3
	1–4	58:52 – EN – Nuutinen (Rantamäki)
	1–5	59:27 – EN – Täks (Valkjärvi)

6 min
Penalties
2 min
17
Shots
29

== Player statistics ==
=== Scoring leaders ===
The following players led the league in playoff points at the conclusion of the game played on 5 April 2026.

Player	Team	GP	G	A	Pts	PIM
Emma Nuutinen	K-Espoo	12	11	10	21	6
Kiira Yrjänen	K-Espoo	12	9	6	15	16
Eva Lamberg	HPK	16	6	6	12	14
Anni Montonen	K-Espoo	12	4	8	12	2
Pauliina Salonen	HIFK	12	7	4	11	12
Tinja-Mariia Haukijärvi	K-Espoo	12	5	6	11	0
Barbora Juříčková	HPK	6	6	4	10	2
Anna Kalová	HPK	16	6	4	10	2
Matilda Nilsson	Ilves	8	5	5	10	0
Elli Suoranta	Ilves	8	4	6	10	2
Heidi Kokora	HPK	16	4	6	10	6
Emilia Varpula	Ilves	8	2	8	10	2
Reetta Valkjärvi	K-Espoo	12	2	8	10	0
Nea Katajamäki	K-Espoo	12	2	8	10	6
Ines Lukkarila	HPK	16	2	8	10	6
Emmi Juusela	HIFK	11	3	6	9	6
Ella Turunen	HIFK	12	3	6	9	0
Aliisa Toivonen	K-Espoo	12	2	7	9	2
Kiti Seikkula	HPK	16	2	7	9	4
Karoliina Rantamäki	K-Espoo	12	2	6	8	0

=== Goaltenders ===
The following table lists all goaltenders who had played at least one-third of their team's playoff minutes in net at the conclusion of the game played on 5 April 2026, sorted by save percentage.

^	Team eliminated in quarterfinals

Player	Team	GP	TOI	W	L	SA	GA	SO	SV%	GAA
Miia Vainio^	TPS	3	178:54	1	2	103	6	0	94.2	2.01
Anni Keisala	HPK	16	987:57	8	6	393	32	1	91.9	1.94
Lilli Packalén	HIFK	11	702:37	5	4	255	21	2	91.8	1.79
Neea Pohjamo	Ilves	8	481:19	4	4	217	20	0	90.8	2.49
Lilia Huovinen^	Kuortane	2	114:12	0	2	75	7	0	90.7	3.68
Tiia Pajarinen	K-Espoo	9	544:36	7	2	195	19	1	90.3	2.09
Kerttu Kuja-Halkola^	Kuortane	1	58:06	0	1	30	3	0	90.0	3.10
Kati Asikainen^	Kärpät	4	192:56	1	3	132	14	0	89.4	4.35
Salla Sivula^	KalPa	2	109:07	0	2	78	11	0	85.9	6.05
Annika Saastamoinen^	KalPa	2	70:53	0	1	60	9	0	85.0	7.62

The following table lists all goaltenders who had accumulated less than one-third of their team's playoff minutes in net at the conclusion of the game played on 5 April 2026, sorted by save percentage.

Player	Team	GP	TOI	W	L	SA	GA	SO	SV%	GAA
Ronja Pätsi^	Kärpät	1	42:10	0	0	28	1	0	96.4	1.42
Minja Drufva	K-Espoo	3	180:00	3	0	44	4	0	90.9	1.33
Tiina Ranne^	TPS	1	67:49	0	1	43	4	0	90.7	3.54
Janika Järvikari	HIFK	1	58:19	0	1	22	3	0	86.4	3.09
