= 2025 Aurora Borealis Cup playoffs =

Finnish Championship ice hockey tournament edition

Auroraliigan pudotuspelit 2025 (Finnish) 2025 Auroraliiga playoffs

Tournament details
- Dates: 22 February 2025 – 27 March 2025
- Format: Best-of
- Teams: 8

Final positions
- Champions: Kiekko-Espoo (17th title)
- Runners-up: HPK Hämeenlinna
- Third place: Ilves Tampere
- Fourth place: Team Kuortane

Tournament statistics
- Games played: 31
- Goals scored: 127 (4.1 per game)
- Attendance: 5,774 (186 per game)
- Scoring leader: Emma Nuutinen (16 pts)

Awards
- Playoff MVP: Minttu Tuominen
- All statistics correct as of 27 March 2025.

The 2025 Aurora Borealis Cup playoffs or the 2025 Auroraliiga playoffs (Finnish: Auroraliigan pudotuspelit 2025) is the playoff tournament for the 2024–25 season of the Auroraliiga. The tournament began on 22 February and the Aurora Borealis Cup was awarded to Kiekko-Espoo on 27 March.

IFK Helsinki, winners of the 2024 Naisten Liiga playoffs, were the defending Aurora Borealis Cup champions until being eliminated in the 2025 quarterfinals.

Entering the playoffs, Kiekko-Espoo were the favorites for the 2025 Aurora Borealis Cup.

== Season reviews ==
=== Kiekko-Espoo ===
Finishing thirteen points ahead of the competition, Kiekko-Espoo claimed the regular season title for the second consecutive season. Three of the season's top-five scorers were Kiekko-Espoo players, including the overall league points leader, Emma Nuutinen (27 goals+38 assists=65 points); the league's top goal scorer, Lisette Täks (30+25); and the league's top-scoring defenseman, Minttu Tuominen (14+35).

=== HPK ===
HPK ended the regular season ranked second in the league – the team's best finish since the 2010–11 season in which they won the Aurora Borealis Cup.

=== Team Kuortane ===
Team Kuortane achieved the best regular season finish in team history after overtaking HIFK and clinching the third seed on the last day of the regular season. The team was buoyed by aggressive offense, one of the league's strongest blue lines, and goaltending that displayed flashes of brilliance.

=== HIFK ===
Defending Aurora Borealis Cup champions IFK Helsinki saw an unusually high number of players leave the team following the 2024 Finnish Championship, with nine significant players not returning for the 2024–25 season. Departures ahead of the 2024–25 season included Michaela Pejzlová, Sanni Vanhanen, Julia Liikala, and Clara Rozier, four of the top-five point scorers in the league during the previous season; Kiia Lahtinen, the league's 2023–24 best goaltender by save percentage; Siiri Yrjölä, the team's 2023–24 top-scoring defenseman; and team captain Karoliina Rantamäki. HIFK's slide from second in the standings in 2023–24 to fourth in 2024–25 can be broadly attributed to the changes in roster composition.

Notable off-season signings included forwards Emma Lappalainen and Iida Lappalainen from RoKi and goaltender Tea Koljonen from Kiekko-Espoo, however, HIFK opted to fill most of the vacancies with young players from its own development system. The influx of youth players pushed the team's average age from 21 years, which had held steady across both of the previous seasons, to 19.7 years in 2024–25.

Across the 32-game season, HIFK recorded twenty wins and nine losses in regulation time and an additional win and two losses in overtime for 64 totals points. They scored 113 goals on the season, a total of 62 fewer goals than in 2023–24. Twenty year old center Pauliina Salonen narrowly led HIFK's scoring and placed ninth on the league scoring chart, with sixteen goals and eighteen assists for 34 points. Her linemates both notched 33 points, with Anni Pere (16 goals + 17 assists) ranking tenth in league scoring and Emmi Juusela (7+26) ranking thirteenth. Twelve players recorded ten or more points for HIFK on the season, with notable contributions from veteran forward Johanna Kemppainen (9+11=20) and the team's top-scoring defensemen, eighteen year old Heidi Holmberg (7+13=20) and newly appointed captain Athéna Locatelli (4+13=17).

With the departure of Lahtinen, netminder Miia Vainio was promoted from backup to starter and the twenty year old struggled with the increased workload. She recorded a decent but unremarkable save percentage of 90.1 and similarly middling goals against average of 2.51 across 23 appearances, which respectively ranked eighth and seventh of all goaltenders playing at least one-third of their team's minutes. Eighteen year old backup Nelli Nieminen was the league's top netminder of those playing less than one-third of their team's minutes, achieving a solid 91.5 save percentage and respectable 1.67 goals against average across six outings.

== Bracket ==
As of 27 March 2025

Quarterfinals
1	Kiekko-Espoo	5	7	4	–	–	3
8	Kärpät Oulu	2	2	0	–	–	0
4	IFK Helsinki	4	2	2	1	2	2
5	Ilves Tampere	0	4	1	5	3	3
2	HPK Hämeenlinna	3	1	4	3	–	3
7	TPS Turku	0	4	1	0	–	1
3	Team Kuortane	5	3	1	2	–	3
6	KalPa Kuopio	0	1	2	0	–	1

Semifinals
Kiekko-Espoo	4	3	2	3	–	–	–	4
Ilves Tampere	0	1	1	2	–	–	–	0
HPK Hämeenlinna	1	4	4	2	1	–	–	4
Team Kuortane	2	2	2	1	1	–	–	1

Finals
1st place, gold medalist(s)	Kiekko-Espoo	2	0	1	2	3	–	–	4
2nd place, silver medalist(s)	HPK Hämeenlinna	1	2	0	0	2	–	–	1
Bronze medal game
3rd place, bronze medalist(s)	Ilves Tampere	4
4	Team Kuortane	1

== Quarterfinals ==
The best-of-five quarterfinals (Finnish: puolivälierät) began on Saturday, 22 February and concluded on Sunday, 2 March. The top eight teams from the regular season qualified for the quarterfinal round.

Each series alternated venue on a per-game basis, with home ice advantage granted to the higher seeded team for the first, third, and potential fifth game. Due to the substantial distance between Kiekko-Espoo and Kärpät's homes, the teams were scheduled to play back-to-back games at each venue rather than alternating on a per-game basis. Kiekko-Espoo was granted home ice advantage for the first, second, and potential fifth game.

All times local, Eastern European Time (UTC+2)

=== (1) K-Espoo vs. (8) Kärpät ===
Abbreviations: PP1 = Power play goal (+1 advantage); PP2 = Power play goal (+2 advantage); SH1 = Short handed goal (–1 advantage)

22 February 2025; 13:15	Kiekko-Espoo	5–2 (3–1, 1–1, 1–0)	Kärpät Oulu	Tapiola 2, Espoo; Attendance: 102

Tiia Pajarinen
Goalies
Kati Asikainen
Referee:
Johanna Oksanen
Linesmen:
Eleonoora Mikkonen
Aleksis Koistinen

Täks (Rantamäki, Nuutinen) – 04:05	1–0
	1–1	10:02 – Mateičková (Ylitalo, Antti-Roiko)
Nuutinen (Rantamäki, Täks) – 11:39	2–1
Täks (Nuutinen, Tuominen) – PP1 – 18:31	3–1
	3–2	32:33 – PP1 – Puusaari (Kaijankoski, Korpi-Halkola)
Virtanen (Montonen) – 34:21	4–2
Nuutinen (Rantamäki, Tuominen) – 43:09	5–2

10 min
Penalties
20 min
43
Shots
25

23 February 2025; 14:45	Kiekko-Espoo	7–2 (0–1, 4–1, 3–0)	Kärpät Oulu	Tapiola 2, Espoo; Attendance: 121

Minja Drufva
Goalies
Kati Asikainen
Referee:
Reetta-Kaisa Lusi
Linesmen:
Salla-Maaria Raitala
Eleonoora Mikkonen

	0–1	01:00 – Hulanmäki
Rantamäki (Nuutinen) – 20:10	1–1
Katajamäki (Villilä, Montonen) – 21:24	2–1
Talvitie (Koskipalo, Haukijärvi) – 22:05	3–1
Katajamäki (Villilä, Toivonen) – 29:24	4–1
	4–2	39:06 – Antti-Roiko (Korpi-Halkola)
Nuutinen (Rantamäki) – 40:14	5–2
Nuutinen (Rantamäki, Eronen) – 43:19	6–2
Eronen (Tuominen, Nuutinen) – PP1 – 58:16	7–2

0 min
Penalties
4 min
38
Shots
11

28 February 2025; 17:45	Kärpät Oulu	0–4 (0–0, 0–3, 0–1)	Kiekko-Espoo	Raksilan jäähalli, Oulu; Attendance: 283

Kati Asikainen
Goalies
Tiia Pajarinen
Referee:
Veikka Hänninen
Linesmen:
Pietu Mustonen
Juho Määttä

0–1	20:26 – PP1 – Nuutinen (Tuominen, Eronen)
0–2	27:02 – Talvitie (Järvinen)
0–3	36:47 – SH1 – Rantamäki (Tuominen)
0–4	41:06 – PP2 – Rantamäki (Tuominen, Nuutinen)

8 min
Penalties
27 min
15
Shots
37

=== (2) HPK vs. (7) TPS ===
Abbreviations: PP1 = Power play goal (+1 advantage); PP2 = Power play goal (+2 advantage); SH1 = Short handed goal (–1 advantage); EN = Empty net goal

22 February 2025; 14:00	HPK Hämeenlinna	3–0 (0–0, 1–0, 2–0)	TPS Turku	Hämeenlinnan harjoitushalli, Hämeenlinna; Attendance: 120

Anni Keisala
Goalies
Tiina Ranne
Referee:
Reetta-Kaisa Lusi
Linesmen:
Kimi Känkänen
Nooa Lahti

K. Seikkula (Saukkonen, Lukkarila) – 31:29	1–0
Välikangas (Matejková) – 41:44	2–0
K. Seikkula (Stoltenberg) – EN – 57:40	3–0

6 min
Penalties
8 min
47
Shots
24

23 February 2025; 14:20	TPS Turku	4–1 (0–0, 2–0, 2–1)	HPK Hämeenlinna	Kupittaan jäähalli, Turku; Attendance: 100

Tiina Ranne
Goalies
Anni Keisala
Referee:
Joni Kohomäki
Linesmen:
Aino Ranki
Ilona Silander

Friederiksen – 25:46	1–0
Berg (Korpela) – PP2 – 36:48	2–0
	2–1	43:40 – SH1 – Välikangas
Haaranoja – 49:54	3–1
Metsä-Tokila (Korpela, Berg) – EN – 58:40	4–1

2 min
Penalties
8 min
19
Shots
45

26 February 2025; 18:45	HPK Hämeenlinna	4–1 (1–0, 1–0, 2–1)	TPS Turku	Hämeenlinnan harjoitushalli, Hämeenlinna; Attendance: 160

Anni Keisala
Goalies
Tiina Ranne
Referee:
Linnea Marin
Linesmen:
Kimi Känkänen
Joonas Ryyppö

Lukkarila (K. Seikkula, Saukkonen) – PP1 – 19:51	1–0
K. Seikkula (Lukkarila, Saukkonen) – 34:17	2–0
K. Seikkula (Tillman) – 42:36	3–0
	3–1	55:00 – Mäkivaara (Berg)
Välikangas (K. Seikkula) – EN – 58:26	4–1

4 min
Penalties
6 min
33
Shots
25

1 March 2025; 13:20	TPS Turku	0–3 (0–3, 0–0, 0–0)	HPK Hämeenlinna	Kupittaan jäähalli, Turku; Attendance: 103

Tiina Ranne
Goalies
Anni Keisala
Referee:
Linnea Marin
Linesmen:
Nooa Lahti
Ilona Silander

0–1	01:07 – Välikangas
0–2	04:01 – Saukkonen (Matejková, K. Seikkula)
0–3	19:41 – Juříčková (K. Seikkula)

6 min
Penalties
2 min
25
Shots
28

=== (3) Kuortane vs. (6) KalPa ===
Abbreviations: PP1 = Power play goal (+1 advantage); EN = Empty net goal; DP = Delayed penalty

22 February 2025; 15:00	Team Kuortane	5–0 (3–0, 0–0, 2–0)	KalPa Kuopio	Kuortaneen jäähalli, Kuortane; Attendance: 80

Lilia Huovinen
Goalies
Salla Sivula
Referee:
Janne Silander

Kari (Tarkianen, Mustonen) – PP1 – 10:19	1–0
Kolmonen (Je. Ojala) – 16:01	2–0
Lehmus (Kokora) – 19:57	3–0
Byskata (Lehmus, Pelkonen) – 55:37	4–0
Kokora (Siekkinen) – EN – 57:16	5–0

4 min
Penalties
4 min
44
Shots
18

23 February 2025; 16:00	KalPa Kuopio	1–3 (0–1, 1–1, 0–1)	Team Kuortane	Kuopion jäähalli, Kuopio; Attendance: 180

Salla Sivula
Goalies
Kerttu Kuja-Halkola
Referee:
Mia Järvinen
Linesmen:
Anni Kankkunen
Miia Partanen

	0–1	14:44 – DP – Pelkonen (Tarkiainen, Mustonen)
	0–2	22:00 – PP1 – Mustonen (Tarkiainen, Lehmus)
Sano (Oksanen, Kivi) – 25:01	1–2
	1–3	49:36 – PP1 – Krook (Byskata, Kankkunen)

12 min
Penalties
6 min
17
Shots
26

26 February 2025; 18:30	Team Kuortane	1–2 (0–1, 1–1, 0–0)	KalPa Kuopio	Kuortaneen jäähalli, Kuortane; Attendance: 120

Lilia Huovinen
Goalies
Salla Sivula
Referee:
Kaisa Ketonen
Linesmen:
Henni Rantala
Tiina Saarimäki

	0–1	19:06 – Keränen (Pohjala)
Byskata (Kankkunen, Tarkiainen)	1–1
	1–2	31:29 – PP1 – Jo. Juutilainen (Mäkelä, Keränen)

2 min
Penalties
8 min
34
Shots
16

1 March 2025; 12:30	KalPa Kuopio	0–2 (0–1, 0–0, 0–1)	Team Kuortane	Kuopion jäähalli, Kuopio; Attendance: 83

Salla Sivula	Goalies	Kerttu Kuja-Halkola	Referee: Kari-Matti Heinonen; Linesmen: Arttu Riikonen; Miia Partanen
0–1 / 09:55 – Kolmonen (Tallinen, Siekkinen); 0–2 / 44:33 – Tallinen			Referee: Kari-Matti Heinonen; Linesmen: Arttu Riikonen; Miia Partanen
2 min	Penalties	4 min	Referee: Kari-Matti Heinonen; Linesmen: Arttu Riikonen; Miia Partanen
17	Shots	27	Referee: Kari-Matti Heinonen; Linesmen: Arttu Riikonen; Miia Partanen

=== (4) HIFK vs. (5) Ilves ===
Abbreviations: PP1 = Power play goal (+1 advantage); EN = Empty net goal; DP = Delayed penalty

22 February 2025; 12:00	IFK Helsinki	4–0 (1–0, 0–0, 3–0)	Ilves Tampere	Pirkkolan jäähalli, Helsinki; Attendance: 157

Miia Vainio
Goalies
Melisa Mörönen
Referee:
Juha Antikainen
Linesmen:
Salla-Maaria Raitala
Jesse Simula

I. Lappalainen (Salonen) – 10:37	1–0
Pere (Holmberg, Lehikoinen) – 50:30	2–0
I. Lappalainen (E. Lappalainen) – 50:46	3–0
Vihervuori – PP1, EN, DP – 58:24	4–0

6 min
Penalties
8 min
21
Shots
21

23 February 2025; 14:00	Ilves Tampere	4–2 (1–1, 1–0, 2–1)	IFK Helsinki	Tesoman jäähalli, Tampere; Attendance: 96

Melisa Mörönen
Goalies
Miia Vainio
Referee:
Linnea Marin
Linesmen:
Tiina Saarimäki
Julius Kyrkkö

	0–1	13:45 – Juusela (Salonen)
Puputti (Ekoluoma, Ad. Makkonen) – 15:32	1–1
Kupari (Varpula, Sundman) – 37:08	2–1
Kupari (Varpula, Sundman) – 45:10	3–1
Nilsson (Melotindos, Kuusisto) – 46:05	4–1
	4–2	55:37 – Korhonen (Kemppainen, Kylliäinen)

0 min
Penalties
4 min
29
Shots
28

26 February 2025; 18:00	IFK Helsinki	2–1 OT (0–1, 1–0, 0–0) (OT: 1–0)	Ilves Tampere	Pirkkolan jäähalli, Helsinki; Attendance: 169

Miia Vainio
Goalies
Melisa Mörönen
Referee:
Juha Antikainen
Linesmen:
Salla-Maaria Raitala
Aleksis Koistinen

	0–1	00:39 – Melotindos (Kuusisto, Ad. Makkonen)
E. Lappalainen (Kylliäinen, Huotari) – 29:42	1–1
Kylliäinen (Salonen) – 65:05	2–1

8 min
Penalties
6 min
24
Shots
32

1 March 2025; 16:00	Ilves Tampere	5–1 (1–0, 1–1, 3–0)	IFK Helsinki	Tesoman jäähalli, Tampere; Attendance: 146

Melisa Mörönen
Goalies
Miia Vainio
Referee:
Anniina Nurmi
Linesmen:
Julius Kyrkkö
Niko Åberg

Siira (Mylläri, Ekoluoma) – 09:56	1–0
	1–1	31:20 – Pere (Juusela, Salonen)
Suoranta (Ekoluoma) – PP1 – 34:29	2–1
Melotindos (Mylläri, Parkkonen) – 48:41	3–1
Ekoluoma (Nilsson, Kuusisto) – 49:05	4–1
Nilsson (Riipinen, Lehtiniemi) – EN – 57:07	5–1

4 min
Penalties
18 min
46
Shots
18

2 March 2025; 14:30	IFK Helsinki	2–3 (2–1, 0–2, 0–0)	Ilves Tampere	Pirkkolan jäähalli, Helsinki; Attendance: 249

Miia Vainio
Goalies
Melisa Mörönen
Referee:
Anniina Nurmi
Linesmen:
Julius Kyrkkö
Tiina Saarimäki

	0–1	01:38 – Mylläri (Puputti, Siira)
Pere (Juusela, Salonen) – 04:01	1–1
Turunen (E. Lappalainen, Palin) – 04:22	2–1
	2–2	25:19 – Ekoluoma (Lehtiniemi, Mylläri)
	2–3	35:04 – PP1 – Mylläri (Melotindos, Parkkonen)

12 min
Penalties
4 min
16
Shots
30

== Semifinals ==
The best-of-seven semifinals (Finnish: välierät) began on Tuesday, 4 March and concluded on Wednesday, 12 March.

All times local, Eastern European Time (UTC+2)

=== K-Espoo vs Ilves ===
Abbreviations: PP1 = Power play goal (+1 advantage); EN = Empty net goal

4 March 2025; 18:45	Kiekko-Espoo	4–0 (0–0, 1–0, 3–0)	Ilves Tampere	Tapiola 2, Espoo; Attendance: 142

Tiia Pajarinen
Goalies
Melisa Mörönen
Referee:
Johanna Oksanen
Linesmen:
Helinä Anttila
Aleksis Koistinen

Nuutinen (Rantamäki, Tuominen) – PP1 – 21:44	1–0
Haukijärvi (Eronen, Talvitie) – 44:32	2–0
Haukijärvi (Koskipalo) – 47:48	3–0
Nuutinen – EN – 58:45	4–0

4 min
Penalties
10 min
34
Shots
35

6 March 2025; 18:15	Ilves Tampere	1–3 (0–1, 1–0, 0–2)	Kiekko-Espoo	Tesoman jäähalli, Tampere; Attendance: 115

Melisa Mörönen
Goalies
Tiia Pajarinen
Referee:
Reetta-Kaisa Lusi
Linesmen:
Julius Kyrkkö
Aino Ranki

	0–1	17:46 – Täks (Nuutinen, Tuominen)
Ekoluoma – 35:23	1–1
	1–2	53:33 – Täks (Toivonen, Katajamäki)
	1–3	55:17 – Täks (Eronen, Rantamäki)

10 min
Penalties
2 min
28
Shots
45

8 March 2025; 13:15	Kiekko-Espoo	2–1 (1–0, 0–0, 1–1)	Ilves Tampere	Tapiola 2, Espoo; Attendance: 201

Minja Drufva
Goalies
Melisa Mörönen
Referee:
Juha Antikainen
Linesmen:
Eleonoora Mikkonen
Aleksis Koistinen

Talvitie (Haukijärvi, Lehtopelto) – 09:02	1–0
	1–1	41:49 – Suoranta (Nilsson, Riipinen)
Täks (Katajamäki, Toivonen) – 50:59	2–1

6 min
Penalties
6 min
32
Shots
24

9 March 2025; 14:45	Ilves Tampere	2–3 (0–0, 1–0, 1–3)	Kiekko-Espoo	Tesoman jäähalli, Tampere; Attendance: 115

Melisa Mörönen
Goalies
Tiia Pajarinen
Referee:
Linnea Marin
Linesmen:
Aino Ranki
Ilona Silander

Nilsson (Nurminen) – 39:38	1–0
Kuusisto (Nilsson) – 44:52	2–0
	2–1	48:16 – Toivonen (Villilä, Virtanen)
	2–2	54:22 – Rantamäki (Katajamäki, Nuutinen)
	2–3	59:07 – Montonen (Toivonen, Villilä)

6 min
Penalties
14 min
41
Shots
31

=== HPK vs Kuortane ===
Abbreviations: PP1 = Power play goal (+1 advantage); EN = Empty net goal; EA = Extra attacker

4 March 2025; 18:30	HPK Hämeenlinna	1–2 (0–0, 0–1, 1–1)	Team Kuortane	Hämeenlinnan jäähalli, Hämeenlinna; Attendance: 160

Anni Keisala
Goalies
Kerttu Kuja-Halkola
Referee:
Linnea Marin
Linesmen:
Joonas Ryyppö
Tiina Saarimäki

	0–1	29:22 – Kokora (Tallinen, Siivonen)
Viitala (Lehto) – 41:34	1–1
	1–2	41:56 – Pelkonen (Kari, Tallinen)

8 min
Penalties
2 min
24
Shots
26

6 March 2025; 18:30	Team Kuortane	2–4 (1–0, 0–2, 1–2)	HPK Hämeenlinna	Kuortaneen jäähalli, Kuortane; Attendance: 150

Kerttu Kuja-Halkola
Goalies
Anni Keisala
Referee:
Kaisa Ketonen
Linesmen:
Henni Rantala
Tiina Saarimäki

Mustonen – 01:49	1–0
	1–1	34:12 – PP1 – K. Seikkula (Lukkarila, H. Seikkula)
	1–2	34:36 – K. Seikkula (Juříčková, Stoltenberg)
Kari (Pelkonen) – 53:34	2–2
	2–3	54:41 – K. Seikkula (H. Seikkula, Lukkarila)
	2–4	59:21 – EN – Lamberg

6 min
Penalties
8 min
25
Shots
20

8 March 2025; 14:30	HPK Hämeenlinna	4–2 (1–1, 2–0, 1–1)	Team Kuortane	Hämeenlinnan jäähalli, Hämeenlinna; Attendance: 210

Anni Keisala
Goalies
Lilia Huovinen
Referee:
Reetta-Kaisa Lusi
Linesmen:
Aino Ranki
Ilona Silander

Lehto (Viitala, Heidenberger) – 01:37	1–0
	1–1	19:27 – Lehmus (Kankkunen)
Saukkonen (Virtanen) – PP1 – 32:57	2–1
Lukkarila (Saukkonen) – 37:54	3–1
Juříčková (K. Seikkula) – 52:55	4–1
	4–2	59:37 – PP1, EA – Kokora (Kari, Kolmonen)

4 min
Penalties
2 min
27
Shots
24

9 March 2025; 15:00	Team Kuortane	1–2 OT (0–0, 1–0, 0–1) (OT: 0–1)	HPK Hämeenlinna	Kuortaneen jäähalli, Kuortane; Attendance: 120

Kerttu Kuja-Halkola
Goalies
Anni Keisala
Referee:
Kaisa Ketonen
Linesmen:
Heini Rantala
Tiina Saarimäki

Mustonen (Kari) – 30:56	1–0
	1–1	46:52 – Juříčková (Stoltenberg)
	1–2	73:58 – Virtanen (Lukkarila, Välikangas)

4 min
Penalties
10 min
38
Shots
21

12 March 2025; 18:30	HPK Hämeenlinna	1–0 (0–0, 1–0, 0–0)	Team Kuortane	Hämeenlinnan jäähalli, Hämeenlinna; Attendance: 210

Anni Keisala	Goalies	Kerttu Kuja-Halkola	Referee: Anniina Nurmi; Linesmen: Aino Ranki; Tiina Saarimäki
Stoltenberg (Matejková, Juříčková) – 39:34 / 1–0			Referee: Anniina Nurmi; Linesmen: Aino Ranki; Tiina Saarimäki
2 min	Penalties	2 min	Referee: Anniina Nurmi; Linesmen: Aino Ranki; Tiina Saarimäki
20	Shots	21	Referee: Anniina Nurmi; Linesmen: Aino Ranki; Tiina Saarimäki

== Bronze medal game ==
The Finnish Championship bronze medal game (Finnish: pronssiottelu) was played on Saturday, 22 March 2025. Ilves claimed the seventh Finnish Championship bronze medal in team history, in a 4–1 victory over Team Kuortane.

Game time local, Eastern European Time (UTC+2)
Abbreviations: PP1 = Power play goal (+1 advantage); EN = Empty net goal

22 March 2025; 15:00	Team Kuortane	1–4 (0–0, 0–2, 1–2)	Ilves Tampere	Kuortaneen jäähalli, Kuortane; Attendance: 240

Kerttu Kuja-Halkola
Goalies
Melisa Mörönen
Referee:
Kaisa Ketonen
Linesmen:
Henni Rantala
Julius Kyrkkö

	0–1	24:19 – PP1 – Kuusisto (Suoranta, Varpula)
	0–2	39:41 – PP1 – Lehtiniemi (Melotindos)
Mustonen (Tarkiainen, Kari) – PP1 – 50:20	1–2
	1–3	54:11 – PP1 – Siira (Lehtiniemi, Mylläri)
	1–4	59:34 – EN – Mylläri (Ekoluoma)

8 min
Penalties
4 min
34
Shots
28

== Finals ==
The best-of-seven Finnish Championship finals (Finnish: Suomen mestaruus finaalit or SM-finaalit), also called the grand finale (Finnish: loppuottelut), began on Tuesday, 18 March. The Aurora Borealis Cup was awarded to Kiekko-Espoo on Thursday, 27 March.

All times local, Eastern European Time (UTC+2)
Abbreviations:PP1 = Power play goal (+1 advantage); EN = Empty net goal; DP = Delayed penalty

18 March 2025; 18:45	Kiekko-Espoo	2–1 OT (0–0, 0–1, 1–0) (OT: 1–0)	HPK Hämeenlinna	Tapiola 2, Espoo; Attendance: 215

Tiia Pajarinen
Goalies
Anni Keisala
Referee:
Reetta-Kaisa Lusi
Linesmen:
Salla-Maaria Raitala
Helinä Anttila

	0–1	26:16 – Matejková (Tillman, Juříčková)
Montonen (Katajamäki, Virtanen) – 49:52	1–1
Montonen – 72:50	2–1

2 min
Penalties
8 min
32
Shots
24

20 March 2025; 18:30	HPK Hämeenlinna	2–0 (0–0, 0–2, 0–0)	Kiekko-Espoo	Hämeenlinnan jäähalli, Hämeenlinna; Attendance: 350

Anni Keisala	Goalies	Tiia Pajarinen	Referee: Anniina Nurmi; Linesmen: Tiina Saarimäki; Aino Ranki
H. Seikkula (K. Seikkula, Matejková) – 20:31 / 1–0; Juříčková (H. Seikkula) – DP – 29:46 / 2–0			Referee: Anniina Nurmi; Linesmen: Tiina Saarimäki; Aino Ranki
2 min	Penalties	4 min	Referee: Anniina Nurmi; Linesmen: Tiina Saarimäki; Aino Ranki
23	Shots	32	Referee: Anniina Nurmi; Linesmen: Tiina Saarimäki; Aino Ranki

22 March 2025; 14:45	Kiekko-Espoo	1–0 (0–0, 0–0, 1–0)	HPK Hämeenlinna	Tapiola 2, Espoo; Attendance: 367

Tiia Pajarinen	Goalies	Anni Keisala	Referee: Reetta-Kaisa Lusi; Linesmen: Salla-Maaria Raitala; Helinä Anttila
Villilä (Rantamäki, Nuutinen) – 51:59 / 1–0			Referee: Reetta-Kaisa Lusi; Linesmen: Salla-Maaria Raitala; Helinä Anttila
2 min	Penalties	2 min	Referee: Reetta-Kaisa Lusi; Linesmen: Salla-Maaria Raitala; Helinä Anttila
25	Shots	7	Referee: Reetta-Kaisa Lusi; Linesmen: Salla-Maaria Raitala; Helinä Anttila

25 March 2025; 18:30	HPK Hämeenlinna	0–2 (0–0, 0–1, 0–1)	Kiekko-Espoo	Hämeenlinnan jäähalli, Hämeenlinna; Attendance: 410

Anni Keisala	Goalies	Tiia Pajarinen	Referee: Anniina Nurmi; Linesmen: Tiina Saarimäki; Aino Ranki
0–1 / 26:14 – PP1 – Nuutinen (Tuominen, Villilä); 0–2 / 59:16 – EN – Montonen (Rantamäki)			Referee: Anniina Nurmi; Linesmen: Tiina Saarimäki; Aino Ranki
6 min	Penalties	6 min	Referee: Anniina Nurmi; Linesmen: Tiina Saarimäki; Aino Ranki
17	Shots	24	Referee: Anniina Nurmi; Linesmen: Tiina Saarimäki; Aino Ranki

27 March 2025; 18:45	Kiekko-Espoo	3–2 OT (1–0, 0–1, 1–1) (OT: 1–0)	HPK Hämeenlinna	Tapiola 2, Espoo; Attendance: 500

Tiia Pajarinen
Goalies
Anni Keisala
Referee:
Reetta-Kaisa Lusi
Linesmen:
Salla-Maaria Raitala
Helinä Anttila

Katajamäki (Eronen, Täks) – 09:23	1–0
	1–1	33:20 – Saukkonen (Viitala, Lehto)
Toivonen (Montonen, Täks) – 52:31	2–1
	2–2	52:58 – Lukkarila (Heidenberger, Virtanen)
Tuominen (Villilä) – 62:31	3–2

0 min
Penalties
2 min
38
Shots
18

== Player statistics ==
=== Scoring leaders ===
The following players led the league in points at the conclusion of the playoffs on 27 March 2025.

Player	Team	GP	G	A	Pts	PIM
Emma Nuutinen	K-Espoo	12	8	8	16	6
Kiti Seikkula	HPK	13	7	6	13	6
Karoliina Rantamäki	K-Espoo	12	4	9	13	0
Minttu Tuominen	K-Espoo	12	1	9	10	6
Lisette Täks	K-Espoo	12	6	3	9	12
Ines Lukkarila	HPK	14	3	5	8	6
Anni Montonen	K-Espoo	12	4	3	7	2
Barbora Juříčková	HPK	14	4	3	7	0
Emma Ekoluoma	Ilves	10	3	4	7	8
Noora Mylläri	Ilves	10	3	4	7	4

=== Goaltenders ===
The following goaltenders had played at least sixty minutes at the conclusion of the playoffs on 27 March 2025, sorted by save percentage.

^	Team eliminated in quarterfinals

Player	Team	GP	TOI	W	L	SA	GA	SO	SV%	GAA
Tiia Pajarinen	K-Espoo	10	612:43	9	1	232	10	4	95.7	0.98
Anni Keisala	HPK	14	859:31	8	6	373	18	4	95.2	1.26
Tiina Ranne^	TPS	4	234:27	1	3	153	9	0	94.1	2.30
Kerttu Kuja-Halkola	Kuortane	7	429:35	3	4	145	11	1	92.4	1.54
Miia Vainio^	HIFK	5	296:50	1	3	157	12	1	92.4	2.43
Salla Sivula^	KalPa	4	238:58	1	3	129	10	0	92.2	2.51
Melisa Mörönen	Ilves	10	599:48	4	5	281	22	0	92.2	2.20
Minja Drufva	K-Espoo	2	120:00	2	0	35	3	0	91.4	1.50
Lilia Huovinen	Kuortane	3	178:42	1	2	61	6	1	90.2	2.01
Kati Asikainen^	Kärpät	3	180:00	0	3	117	16	0	86.3	5.33
