= 2024 IIHF U18 Women's World Championship =

Ice hockey tournament in Zug, Switzerland

Tournament details
- Host country: Switzerland
- Venue: 1 (in 1 host city)
- Dates: 6–14 January 2024
- Teams: 8

Final positions
- Champions: United States (9th title)
- Runners-up: Czechia
- Third place: Canada
- Fourth place: Finland

Tournament statistics
- Games played: 22
- Goals scored: 141 (6.41 per game)
- Attendance: 10,858 (494 per game)
- Scoring leader: (Canada) Chloe Primerano (16 points)

Awards
- MVP: Chloe Primerano

The 2024 IIHF U18 Women's World Championship was the 16th IIHF U18 Women's World Championship in ice hockey.

== Top Division ==
The Top Division tournament was played in Zug, Switzerland, from 6 to 14 January 2024.

=== Match officials ===
Ten referees and ten linesmen were selected for the tournament.

Referees

- (Austria) Julia Kainberger
- (Canada) Brandy Dewar
- (Canada) Elizabeth Mantha
- (Finland) Kaisa Ketonen
- (Germany) Tijana Haack
- (United Kingdom) Hollie Neenan
- (Sweden) Ida Henriksson
- (Switzerland) Mariko Dale
- (Switzerland) Karin Williner
- (United States) Laura White

Linesmen

- (Belgium) Marine Dinant
- (Finland) Johanna Oksanen
- (Hungary) Zóra Gottlibet
- (Hungary) Adrienn Paulheim
- (Netherlands) Britt Kösters
- (Norway) Maren Frøhaug
- (Slovakia) Eva Mária Moleková
- (Switzerland) Jamie Monard
- (Switzerland) Jennifer Vicha
- (United States) Erika Greenen

=== Preliminary round ===
All times are local (UTC+1).

==== Group A ====
Pos	Team	Pld	W	OTW	OTL	L	GF	GA	GD	Pts	Qualification
1	Canada	3	3	0	0	0	29	1	+28	9	Quarterfinals
2	Finland	3	2	0	0	1	9	12	−3	6	Quarterfinals
3	Czechia	3	1	0	0	2	9	12	−3	3	Quarterfinals
4	Germany	3	0	0	0	3	1	23	−22	0	Quarterfinals

Source: IIHF
Rules for classification: 1) points; 2) head-to-head points; 3) head-to-head goal difference; 4) head-to-head number of goals scored; 5) result against closest best-ranked team outside tied teams; 6) result against second-best-ranked team outside tied teams; 7) seeding before tournament

6 January 2024; 12:00	Finland	3–2 (0–1, 1–1, 2–0)	Czechia	Bossard Arena, Zug; Attendance: 214

Kerttu Kuja-Halkola
Goalies
Aneta Šenková
Referees:
(Canada) Elizabeth Mantha
(United Kingdom) Hollie Neenan
Linesmen:
(United States) Erika Greenen
(Slovakia) Eva Mária Moleková

	0–1	06:52 – Šapovalivová (Čabelová, Fromová) (PP)
	0–2	20:35 – Šapovalivová (Paroubková, Plosová)
Ekoluoma (Byskata, Kuusisto) (PP) – 36:28	1–2
Ekoluoma (Kuusisto, Tallinen) (PP) – 44:58	2–2
Ekoluoma (Byskata, Ojala) (SH) – 58:06	3–2

10 min
Penalties
10 min
20
Shots
30

6 January 2024; 20:00	Canada	11–0 (3–0, 6–0, 2–0)	Germany	Bossard Arena, Zug; Attendance: 473

Hannah Clark
Goalies
Hannah Loist
Miriam Siebert
Referees:
(Switzerland) Mariko Dale
(Germany) Tijana Haack
Linesmen:
(Belgium) Marine Dinant
(Hungary) Zóra Gottlibet

D'Alessandro (Primerano) (PP) – 02:03	1–0
Pieckenhagen (Primerano, Mackinnon) – 14:47	2–0
D'Alesandro (Pickering, Stonehouse) – 16:53	3–0
Primerano (Graham) (PP) – 20:10	4–0
D'Alessandro (Manness, Stonehouse) – 21:10	5–0
Murdoch (Logan, Primerano) – 30:17	6–0
Jackson (Murdoch) (SH) – 32:21	7–0
Kraemer – 34:21	8–0
Primerano (Venusio, Logan) – 37:19	9–0
Jackson (Pellerin, Venusio) – 45:47	10–0
Kraemer (Alexander) – 48:47	11–0

6 min
Penalties
8 min
68
Shots
4

7 January 2024; 16:00	Finland	6–0 (2–0, 0–0, 4–0)	Germany	Bossard Arena, Zug; Attendance: 312

Kerttu Kuja-Halkola
Goalies
Hannah Loist
Referees:
(United States) Laura White
(Switzerland) Karin Williner
Linesmen:
(Netherlands) Britt Kösters
(Switzerland) Jamie Monard

Siivonen (Kankkunen, Lehikoinen) – 04:19	1–0
Ekoluoma (Byskata) – 18:49	2–0
Ekoluoma (Tallinen, Kuusisto) (PP2) – 45:39	3–0
Byskata (Tallinen, Kankkunen) (PP) – 51:37	4–0
Byskata (Ekoluoma, Holmberg) – 54:32	5–0
Ekoluoma (Palin, Tallinen) (PP) – 55:43	6–0

4 min
Penalties
37 min
46
Shots
6

7 January 2024; 20:00	Czechia	1–8 (0–1, 1–4, 0–3)	Canada	Bossard Arena, Zug; Attendance: 346

Sára Valérie Ševčíková
Goalies
Rhyah Stewart
Referees:
(Germany) Tijana Haack
(Austria) Julia Kainberger
Linesmen:
(Hungary) Zóra Gottlibet
(Finland) Johanna Oksanen

	0–1	12:28 – Kraemer (Stonehouse, Primerano) (SH)
	0–2	21:43 – Stonehouse (Murdoch) (SH)
	0–3	28:20 – Stonehouse (Murdoch, Venusio) (SH)
	0–4	36:15 – Venusio (Watson, Stonehouse) (PP)
Paroubková – 37:38	1–4
	1–5	39:27 – Jackson (Murdoch, Mackinnon)
	1–6	47:40 – Jackson (Cheung)
	1–7	50:39 – Kraemer (Stonehouse, Zablocki) (PP)
	1–8	55:55 – Alexander (Manness, Pickering) (PP)

8 min
Penalties
18 min
24
Shots
41

9 January 2024; 16:00	Germany	1–6 (0–3, 1–0, 0–3)	Czechia	Bossard Arena, Zug; Attendance: 123

Hannah Loist
Goalies
Aneta Šenková
Referees:
(Sweden) Ida Henriksson
(Switzerland) Karin Williner
Linesmen:
(Netherlands) Britt Kösters
(Switzerland) Jennifer Vicha

	0–1	01:41 – Fromová
	0–2	05:36 – Pánková
	0–3	19:52 – Velinská (Plosová, Šapovalivová)
Hoppe (Pietschmann, Gruß) – 39:00	1–3
	1–4	46:57 – Šapovalivová (Chladová, Plosová)
	1–5	53:07 – Šapovalivová (Čabelová, Plosová)
	1–6	57:30 – Šapovalivová (Hujová, Čabelová)

8 min
Penalties
6 min
10
Shots
46

9 January 2024; 20:00	Canada	10–0 (2–0, 3–0, 5–0)	Finland	Bossard Arena, Zug; Attendance: 346

Hannah Clark
Goalies
Kerttu Kuja-Halkola
Lilia Huovinen
Referees:
(Finland) Kaisa Ketonen
(United States) Laura White
Linesmen:
(Norway) Maren Frøhaug
(United States) Erika Greenen

Primerano – 03:12	1–0
Kraemer – 03:19	2–0
D'Alessandro (Alexander, Pickering) – 20:45	3–0
Logan (Zablocki, Jackson) – 23:49	4–0
Primerano (Pieckenhagen, Venuiso) – 29:06	5–0
Zablocki (Jackson) – 42:01	6–0
Kraemer (Stonehouse) – 44:02	7–0
Primerano (Zablocki) – 56:24	8–0
D'Alessandro (Manness, Alexander) – 57:42	9–0
Kraemer (Zablocki, Venusio) (PP) – 59:56	10–0

4 min
Penalties
12 min
58
Shots
7

==== Group B ====
Pos	Team	Pld	W	OTW	OTL	L	GF	GA	GD	Pts	Qualification
1	United States	3	3	0	0	0	19	2	+17	9	Quarterfinals
2	Sweden	3	2	0	0	1	12	8	+4	6	Quarterfinals
3	Slovakia	3	0	1	0	2	6	14	−8	2	Quarterfinals
4	Switzerland (H)	3	0	0	1	2	3	16	−13	1	Quarterfinals

Source: IIHF
Rules for classification: 1) points; 2) head-to-head points; 3) head-to-head goal difference; 4) head-to-head number of goals scored; 5) result against closest best-ranked team outside tied teams; 6) result against second-best-ranked team outside tied teams; 7) seeding before tournament
(H) Host

6 January 2024; 16:00	Sweden	6–1 (3–0, 1–0, 2–1)	Switzerland	Bossard Arena, Zug; Attendance: 1,128

Maja Helge
Goalies
Talina Benderer
Referees:
(Canada) Brandy Dewar
(Austria) Julia Kainberger
Linesmen:
(Finland) Johanna Oksanen
(Hungary) Adrienn Paulheim

Leijonhielm (Hedqvist, Hallin) (PP) – 15:34	1–0
Hallin (Hedqvist, Danielsson) – 17:00	2–0
Leijonhielm (H. Svensson, Raunio) – 18:00	3–0
Hallin – 27:45	4–0
H. Svensson (Raunio, Hedqvist) (PP) – 44:57	5–0
	5–1	56:22 – D'Alessi (Rossel, Wey)
H. Svensson (Hedqvist, Leijonhielm) (PP) – 58:52	6–1

6 min
Penalties
10 min
38
Shots
25

7 January 2024; 12:00	United States	7–1 (0–1, 1–0, 6–0)	Slovakia	Bossard Arena, Zug; Attendance: 378

Layla Hemp
Goalies
Lívia Debnárová
Mariana Sumegová
Referees:
(Sweden) Ida Henriksson
(Finland) Kaisa Ketonen
Linesmen:
(Norway) Maren Frøhaug
(Switzerland) Jennifer Vicha

	0–1	05:13 – Juríková (Komloš) (SH)
Averill (Distad, Senecal) – 28:08	1–1
Scannell (Thomas, Dimatos) – 40:32	2–1
St. Martin (McGathey) – 41:45	3–1
Averill (Distad, Boyle) – 41:56	4–1
Petrie (Dimatos, Dwyer) – 42:58	5–1
Thomas (Scannell) – 44:34	6–1
McGathey (St. Martin, Derrenbacher) (PP) – 49:31	7–1

2 min
Penalties
14 min
63
Shots
10

8 January 2024; 16:00	Slovakia	3–6 (1–2, 2–1, 0–3)	Sweden	Bossard Arena, Zug; Attendance: 193

Lívia Debnárová
Goalies
Lovisa Lundström
Referees:
(Switzerland) Mariko Dale
(Canada) Elizabeth Mantha
Linesmen:
(Belgium) Marine Dinant
(Slovakia) Eva Mária Moleková

Lopušanová (Beňáková, Krákorová) (PP) – 01:14	1–0
	1–1	14:23 – Hallin (Hedqvist, H. Svensson) (PP)
	1–2	19:29 – Hallin (Hedqvist, H. Svensson) (PP)
	1–3	27:36 – H. Svensson (Leijonhielm)
Karkošková (Blichová) – 30:05	2–3
Tóthová (Tomaštíková) – 36:09	3–3
	3–4	51:08 – Brenkle (Johannesson, Natt och Dag)
	3–5	52:50 – H. Svensson (Raunio, Hedqvist)
	3–6	59:03 – Hellman (Hallin, Raunio) (ENG)

8 min
Penalties
6 min
18
Shots
57

8 January 2024; 20:00	United States	8–1 (2–0, 4–0, 2–1)	Switzerland	Bossard Arena, Zug; Attendance: 914

Layla Hemp
Goalies
Talina Benderer
Alisha Berger
Referees:
(Canada) Brandy Dewar
(United Kingdom) Hollie Neenan
Linesmen:
(Switzerland) Jamie Monard
(Hungary) Adrienn Paulheim

Devlin (Boyle, Senecal) – 02:10	1–0
Thomas (Devlin, Derrenbacher) – 07:18	2–0
Scannell (Derrenbacher, Thomas) – 21:35	3–0
Averill (Petrie, Healy) – 34:15	4–0
St. Martin (McGathey) – 35:07	5–0
Distad (Scannell) – 36:39	6–0
	6–1	47:27 – Inkamp (Manetsch, Kunz) (PP)
Carmichael (McGathey, St. Martin) (PP) – 49:53	7–1
Box (Thomas, Scannell) (PP) – 59:01	8–1

12 min
Penalties
10 min
36
Shots
15

10 January 2024; 12:00	Sweden	0–4 (0–1, 0–3, 0–0)	United States	Bossard Arena, Zug; Attendance: 572

Maja Helge
Goalies
Layla Hemp
Referees:
(Switzerland) Mariko Dale
(Germany) Tijana Haack
Linesmen:
(Hungary) Zóra Gottlibet
(Finland) Johanna Oksanen

0–1	17:41 – Box (Dimatos, Petrie) (PP)
0–2	25:54 – Derrenbacher (Scannell, Dimatos)
0–3	35:28 – McGathey (St. Martin, Derrenbacher)
0–4	38:03 – Carmichael

12 min
Penalties
8 min
28
Shots
35

10 January 2024; 16:00	Switzerland	1–2 OT (0–1, 1–0, 0–0) (OT: 0–1)	Slovakia	Bossard Arena, Zug; Attendance: 1,011

Talina Benderer
Goalies
Lívia Debnárová
Referees:
(Austria) Julia Kainberger
(Canada) Elizabeth Mantha
Linesmen:
(Belgium) Marine Dinant
(Switzerland) Jamie Monard

	0–1	05:15 – Lopušanová (Juríková)
Inkamp (Leibundgut, Balzer) (PP) – 30:05	1–1
	1–2	61:01 – Krákorová (Lopušanová)

8 min
Penalties
6 min
31
Shots
27

=== Playoff round ===
Winning teams were reseeded for the semi-finals in accordance with the following ranking:

1. Higher position in their group
2. Higher number of points in preliminary pool play
3. Better goal differential
4. Higher number of goals scored
5. Better seeding coming into the tournament (final placement at the 2023 IIHF World Women's U18 Championship).

Rank	Team	Group	Pos	Pts	GD	GF	Seed
1	Canada	A	1	9	+28	29	1
2	United States	B	1	9	+17	19	3
3	Sweden	B	2	6	+4	12	2
4	Finland	A	2	6	−3	9	4
5	Czechia	A	3	3	−3	9	5
6	Slovakia	B	3	2	−8	6	6
7	Switzerland	B	4	1	−13	3	7
8	Germany	A	4	0	−22	1	8

==== Bracket ====
Quarterfinals
11 January
1A Canada	6
4B Switzerland	0
11 January
1B United States	4
4A Germany	0
11 January
2A Finland	2
3B Slovakia	0
11 January
2B Sweden	2
3A Czechia	4

Semifinals
13 January
1 Canada	2
5 Czechia	4
13 January
2 United States	4
4 Finland	2

Final
14 January
2 United States	5
5 Czechia	1
Third place
14 January
1 Canada	8
4 Finland	1

==== Quarterfinals ====
11 January 2024; 10:00	Sweden	2–4 (1–2, 0–0, 1–2)	Czechia	Bossard Arena, Zug; Attendance: 308

Maja Helge
Goalies
Aneta Šenková
Referees:
(Canada) Brandy Dewar
(Finland) Kaisa Ketonen
Linesmen:
(United States) Erika Greenen
(Switzerland) Jamie Monard

Leijonhielm (Hedqvist, Hellman) – 14:54	1–0
	1–1	15:47 – Šapovalivová (Plosová, Čabelová)
	1–2	17:47 – Plosová (Čabelová)
Hellman (Leijonhielm, Brenkle) – 47:30	2–2
	2–3	51:26 – Šapovalivová (Plosová, Paroubková)
	2–4	54:13 – Vocetková (Gildainová, Hujová)

6 min
Penalties
8 min
24
Shots
30

11 January 2024; 13:30	Finland	2–0 (0–0, 1–0, 1–0)	Slovakia	Bossard Arena, Zug; Attendance: 265

Kerttu Kuja-Halkola	Goalies	Lívia Debnárová	Referees: (Germany) Tijana Haack (Switzerland) Karin Williner; Linesmen: (Hungary) Zóra Gottlibet (Slovakia) Eva Mária Moleková
Kuusisto (Ekoluoma, Byskata) – 31:29 / 1–0; Ekoluoma (Holmberg, Byskata) – 51:29 / 2–0			Referees: (Germany) Tijana Haack (Switzerland) Karin Williner; Linesmen: (Hungary) Zóra Gottlibet (Slovakia) Eva Mária Moleková
8 min	Penalties	2 min	Referees: (Germany) Tijana Haack (Switzerland) Karin Williner; Linesmen: (Hungary) Zóra Gottlibet (Slovakia) Eva Mária Moleková
24	Shots	19	Referees: (Germany) Tijana Haack (Switzerland) Karin Williner; Linesmen: (Hungary) Zóra Gottlibet (Slovakia) Eva Mária Moleková

11 January 2024; 17:00	Canada	6–0 (2–0, 1–0, 3–0)	Switzerland	Bossard Arena, Zug; Attendance: 477

Rhyah Stewart
Goalies
Talina Benderer
Referees:
(Sweden) Ida Henriksson
(United States) Laura White
Linesmen:
(Norway) Maren Frøhaug
(Netherlands) Britt Kösters

D'Alessandro (Graham, Primerano) – 03:30	1–0
Graham (Cimoroni, Primerano) – 09:47	2–0
Cimoroni (Venusio, Cheung) – 36:32	3–0
D'Alessandro (Murdoch, Primerano) – 41:59	4–0
Jackson (Logan) – 46:56	5–0
Kraemer (Graham, Stonehouse) – 57:47	6–0

6 min
Penalties
4 min
54
Shots
3

11 January 2024; 20:30	United States	4–0 (2–0, 1–0, 1–0)	Germany	Bossard Arena, Zug; Attendance: 189

Natalia Dilbone
Goalies
Miriam Siebert
Referees:
(Switzerland) Mariko Dale
(United Kingdom) Hollie Neenan
Linesmen:
(Hungary) Adrienn Paulheim
(Switzerland) Jennifer Vicha

St. Martin (Petrie, Fanale) – 01:04	1–0
St. Martin (Petrie) – 04:00	2–0
Box (McGathey) – 21:45	3–0
Scannell (Derrenbacher, Dimatos) – 46:49	4–0

10 min
Penalties
8 min
58
Shots
7

==== Semifinals ====
13 January 2024; 15:00	Canada	2–4 (0–1, 1–1, 1–2)	Czechia	Bossard Arena, Zug; Attendance: 523

Hannah Clark
Rhyah Stewart
Goalies
Aneta Šenková
Referees:
(Sweden) Ida Henriksson
(Finland) Kaisa Ketonen
Linesmen:
(Hungary) Zóra Gottlibet
(Finland) Johanna Oksanen

	0–1	13:16 – Šapovalivová (Chladová, Plosová)
	0–2	23:32 – Čabelová (Šapovalivová, Paroubková)
Primerano (Graham) (PP) – 28:45	1–2
Zablocki (Jackson) – 42:03	2–2
	2–3	46:08 – Slavíčková (Juříčková)
	2–4	59:35 – Čabelová (ENG)

6 min
Penalties
8 min
47
Shots
12

13 January 2024; 19:00	United States	4–2 (1–0, 2–2, 1–0)	Finland	Bossard Arena, Zug; Attendance: 481

Layla Hemp
Goalies
Kerttu Kuja-Halkola
Referees:
(Germany) Tijana Haack
(Canada) Elizabeth Mantha
Linesmen:
(Norway) Maren Frøhaug
(Switzerland) Jamie Monard

St. Martin (Petrie) – 04:55	1–0
	1–1	28:24 – Tapani (Ekoluoma, Andersson) (PP)
Derrenbacher (Thomas, McGathey) (PP) – 31:08	2–1
Scannell (Fanale, Petrie) (PP) – 36:46	3–1
	3–2	38:23 – Andersson (Tallinen, Kuusisto) (PP)
St. Martin (Petrie) – 57:20	4–2

6 min
Penalties
4 min
44
Shots
16

==== Relegation game ====
13 January 2024; 11:00	Switzerland	2–1 (0–0, 1–1, 1–0)	Germany	Bossard Arena, Zug; Attendance: 412

Talina Benderer
Goalies
Hannah Loist
Referees:
(Canada) Brandy Dewar
(Austria) Julia Kainberger
Linesmen:
(Belgium) Marine Dinant
(United States) Erika Greenen

	0–1	28:45 – Rose (Gruß, Schrick) (PP)
Müller (Wey, Herzig) – 31:09	1–1
Balzarolo – 41:43	2–1

2 min
Penalties
0 min
26
Shots
21

==== Fifth place game ====
14 January 2024; 11:00	Sweden	4–1 (1–0, 3–0, 0–1)	Slovakia	Bossard Arena, Zug; Attendance: 121

Lovisa Lundström
Goalies
Lívia Debnárová
Referees:
(United States) Laura White
(Switzerland) Karin Williner
Linesmen:
(Slovakia) Eva Mária Moleková
(Switzerland) Jennifer Vicha

Hellman (Hedqvist, Hallin) – 06:26	1–0
Raunio (Leijonhielm, H. Svensson) – 21:21	2–0
Natt och Dag (Utbult, Johannesson) – 22:13	3–0
Brenkle (Hallin, Hedqvist) – 30:19	4–0
	4–1	59:55 – Paulínyová (Beňáková)

8 min
Penalties
6 min
43
Shots
30

==== Bronze medal game ====
14 January 2024; 15:00	Canada	8–1 (3–0, 4–0, 1–1)	Finland	Bossard Arena, Zug; Attendance: 616

Rhyah Stewart
Goalies
Kerttu Kuja-Halkola
Referees:
(Canada) Brandy Dewar
(Germany) Tijana Haack
Linesmen:
(Switzerland) Jamie Monard
(Finland) Johanna Oksanen

Alexander (Primerano, Murdoch) – 04:54	1–0
Stonehouse (D'Alessandro) – 12:19	2–0
Stonehouse (Venusio, Watson) – 18:22	3–0
Kraemer (Alexander, Breton) – 21:45	4–0
Cimoroni (MacKinnon) – 22:51	5–0
Kraemer (Zablocki, Watson) (PP) – 31:17	6–0
Primerano (Jackson) (SH) – 38:15	7–0
Primerano (Graham) – 50:56	8–0
	8–1	51:44 – Ekoluoma (Byskata, Andersson)

8 min
Penalties
8 min
52
Shots
12

==== Gold medal game ====
14 January 2024; 19:00	United States	5–1 (2–0, 0–1, 3–0)	Czechia	Bossard Arena, Zug; Attendance: 1456

Layla Hemp
Goalies
Aneta Šenková
Referees:
(Austria) Julia Kainberger
(Canada) Elizabeth Mantha
Linesmen:
(Belgium) Marine Dinant
(United States) Erika Greenen

Scannell (Thomas, Boyle) – 10:23	1–0
Box (McGathey, Averill) – 11:37	2–0
	2–1	38:43 – Šapovalivová (Čabelová, Plosová) (PP)
Carmichael (Boyle, Senecal) – 44:15	3–1
Carmichael (Thomas, Derrenbacher) (PP) – 53:05	4–1
Thomas (ENG) – 58:11	5–1

31 min
Penalties
6 min
39
Shots
20

=== Awards and statistics ===
==== Awards ====
Best players selected by the Directorate

Position	Player
Goaltender	(Czech Republic) Aneta Šenková
Defender	(Canada) Chloe Primerano
Forward	(Czech Republic) Adéla Šapovalivová

IIHF.com

All-Star team

Position	Player
Goaltender	(Czech Republic) Aneta Šenková
Defender	(Canada) Chloe Primerano
Defender	(Finland) Tuuli Tallinen
Forward	(Czech Republic) Adéla Šapovalivová
Forward	(Finland) Emma Ekoluoma
Forward	(United States) Josie St. Martin
MVP	(Canada) Chloe Primerano

Source:IIHF.com

==== Scoring leaders ====
List shows the top skaters sorted by points, then goals.

Rank	Player	GP	G	A	Pts	+/−	PIM	POS
1	(Canada) Chloe Primerano	6	8	8	16	+18	2	D
2	(Czech Republic) Adéla Šapovalivová	6	9	2	11	+4	2	F
3	(Finland) Emma Ekoluoma	6	8	3	11	−1	4	F
4	(Canada) Abby Stonehouse	6	4	7	11	+7	4	F
5	(Canada) Caitlin Kraemer	6	10	0	10	+7	2	F
6	(Sweden) Ebba Hedqvist	5	1	9	10	+1	6	F
7	(United States) Josie St. Martin	6	6	3	9	+7	2	F
8	(Canada) Morgan Jackson	6	5	4	9	+12	2	F
8	(United States) Margare Scannell	6	5	4	9	+10	2	F
10	(United States) Ava Thomas	6	3	6	9	+8	2	F

GP = Games played; G = Goals; A = Assists; Pts = Points; +/− = Plus/minus; PIM = Penalties in minutes; POS = Position
Source: IIHF

==== Leading goaltenders ====
Only the top five goaltenders, based on save percentage, who have played at least 40% of their team's minutes, are included in this list.

Rank	Player	TOI	GA	GAA	SA	Sv%	SO
1	(Canada) Rhyah Stewart	192:00	2	0.63	40	95.00	1
2	(United States) Layla Hemp	300:00	5	1.00	89	94.38	1
3	(Sweden) Lovisa Lundström	120:00	4	2.00	48	91.67	0
4	(Slovakia) Lívia Debnárová	281:41	17	3.62	201	91.54	0
5	(Czech Republic) Aneta Šenková	297:02	12	2.42	139	91.37	0

TOI = Time on ice (minutes:seconds); SA = Shots against; GA = Goals against; GAA = Goals against average; Sv% = Save percentage; SO = Shutouts
Source: IIHF

=== Final standings ===
Pos	Grp	Team	Pld	W	OTW	OTL	L	GF	GA	GD	Pts	Final result
1	B	United States	6	6	0	0	0	32	5	+27	18	Champions
2	A	Czechia	6	3	0	0	3	18	21	−3	9	Runners-up
3	A	Canada	6	5	0	0	1	45	6	+39	15	Third place
4	A	Finland	6	3	0	0	3	14	24	−10	9	Fourth place
5	B	Sweden	5	3	0	0	2	18	13	+5	9	Fifth place
6	B	Slovakia	5	0	1	0	4	7	20	−13	2	Sixth place
7	B	Switzerland (H)	5	1	0	1	3	5	23	−18	4	Avoided Relegation
8	A	Germany	5	0	0	0	5	2	29	−27	0	Relegated to the Division I A

Source: IIHF
(H) Host

== Division I ==
=== Group A ===
The tournament was held in Egna, Italy from 6 to 12 January 2024.

Pos	Team	Pld	W	OTW	OTL	L	GF	GA	GD	Pts	Promotion or relegation
1	Japan	5	5	0	0	0	21	4	+17	15	Promoted to the 2025 Top Division
2	Italy (H)	5	3	0	1	1	15	13	+2	10	
3	Hungary	5	2	1	0	2	8	8	0	8	
4	Austria	5	1	2	1	1	10	11	−1	8	
5	France	5	1	0	0	4	8	14	−6	3	
6	Denmark	5	0	0	1	4	6	18	−12	1	Relegated to the 2025 Division I B

Source: IIHF
Rules for classification: 1) points; 2) head-to-head points; 3) head-to-head goal difference; 4) head-to-head number of goals scored; 5) result against closest best-ranked team outside tied teams; 6) result against second-best ranked team outside tied teams; 7) seeding before tournament.
(H) Host

=== Group B ===
The tournament was held in Jaca, Spain from 8 to 14 January 2024.

Pos	Team	Pld	W	OTW	OTL	L	GF	GA	GD	Pts	Promotion or relegation
1	Norway	5	5	0	0	0	37	4	+33	15	Promoted to the 2025 Division I A
2	Spain (H)	5	4	0	0	1	33	4	+29	12	
3	Poland	5	3	0	0	2	21	13	+8	9	
4	Australia	5	1	0	0	4	5	32	−27	3 (Note: In head-to-head games Australia 3 pts and +2 GD, South Korea 3 pts and +2 GD, Chinese Taipei 3 pts and –4 GD, Australia defeated South Korea 3–0.)	
5	South Korea	5	1	0	0	4	10	17	−7	3	
6	Chinese Taipei	5	1	0	0	4	6	42	−36	3	Relegated to the 2025 Division II A

Source: IIHF
Rules for classification: 1) points; 2) head-to-head points; 3) head-to-head goal difference; 4) head-to-head number of goals scored; 5) result against closest best-ranked team outside tied teams; 6) result against second-best ranked team outside tied teams; 7) seeding before tournament.
(H) Host

== Division II ==
=== Group A ===
The tournament was held in Heerenveen, Netherlands from 15 to 21 January 2024.

Pos	Team	Pld	W	OTW	OTL	L	GF	GA	GD	Pts	Promotion or relegation
1	China	5	5	0	0	0	48	3	+45	15	Promoted to the 2025 Division I B
2	Great Britain	5	4	0	0	1	22	7	+15	12	
3	Netherlands (H)	5	2	1	0	2	19	29	−10	8	
4	Latvia	5	2	0	1	2	10	13	−3	7	
5	Kazakhstan	5	1	0	0	4	11	20	−9	3	
6	Turkey	5	0	0	0	5	0	38	−38	0	Relegated to the 2025 Division II B

Source: IIHF
Rules for classification: 1) points; 2) head-to-head points; 3) head-to-head goal difference; 4) head-to-head number of goals scored; 5) result against closest best-ranked team outside tied teams; 6) result against second-best ranked team outside tied teams; 7) seeding before tournament.
(H) Host

=== Group B ===
The tournament was held in Sofia, Bulgaria from 8 to 14 January 2024.

Pos	Team	Pld	W	OTW	OTL	L	GF	GA	GD	Pts	Promotion
1	New Zealand	5	4	0	0	1	33	9	+24	12 (Note: New Zealand defeated Iceland 2–0)	Promoted to the 2025 Division II A
2	Iceland	5	4	0	0	1	33	6	+27	12	
3	Belgium	5	3	1	0	1	23	5	+18	11	
4	Mexico	5	2	0	0	3	21	10	+11	6	
5	Bulgaria (H)	5	1	0	1	3	19	15	+4	4	
6	South Africa	5	0	0	0	5	1	85	−84	0	

Source: IIHF
Rules for classification: 1) points; 2) head-to-head points; 3) head-to-head goal difference; 4) head-to-head number of goals scored; 5) result against closest best-ranked team outside tied teams; 6) result against second-best ranked team outside tied teams; 7) seeding before tournament.
(H) Host
