= Ebba Hedqvist =

Swedish ice hockey player (born 2006)

- Born: 30 September 2006 (age 20) Örnsköldsvik, Sweden
- Height: 168 cm (5 ft 6 in)
- Weight: 67 kg (148 lb; 10 st 8 lb)
- Position: Forward
- Shoots: Left
- SDHL team: Modo Hockey
- National team: Sweden
- Playing career: 2021–present
Medal record
World Championship
Bronze medal – third place	2026 Denmark

Ebba Hedqvist (born 30 September 2006) is a Swedish ice hockey forward for Modo Hockey of the Swedish Women's Hockey League (SDHL) and member of Sweden women's national ice hockey team.

== Playing career ==
Hedqvist made her SDHL debut for Modo Hockey during the 2021–22 season at sixteen years old, where she recorded four goals and ten assists in 31 games. During the 2022–23 season, she recorded five goals and seven assists in 30 games. During the 2023–24 season, she recorded nine goals and 17 assists in 32 games. During the 2024–25 season, she recorded seven goals and 17 assists in 35 games. On 23 February 2025, she signed a two-year contract extension with Modo.

== International play ==
Hedqvist represented Sweden at the 2022 European Youth Olympic Winter Festival where she led the team in scoring with two goals and two assists in three games and won a silver medal. She then competed at the 2022 IIHF World Women's U18 Championship where she recorded one goal and one assist in six games. She again represented Sweden at the 2023 IIHF World Women's U18 Championship where she recorded one goal and two assists in four games and won a silver medal. She made her senior national team debut at the 2023 IIHF Women's World Championship at the age of sixteen years old, where she was the youngest player at the tournament, and was scoreless in seven games.

She again represented Sweden at the 2024 IIHF World Women's U18 Championship where she served as team captain and led the team in scoring with one goal and nine assists in five games. On 21 March 2024, she was again named to Sweden's roster for the 2024 IIHF Women's World Championship, where she recorded one goal in five games.

On 25 March 2025, she was again named to Sweden's roster for the 2025 IIHF Women's World Championship. On 15 April 2025, in the final preliminary round game against Norway, she recorded her first career hat-trick.

On 12 January 2026, she was named to Sweden's roster to compete at the 2026 Winter Olympics.

On 20 October 2026, she was selected to represent Sweden at the 2026 IIHF Women's World Championship. She recorded three goals in seven games to help Sweden win their first IIHF Women's World Championship medal since 2007.

== Personal life ==
Hedqvist's older brother, Isac, is a professional ice hockey player for Luleå HF of the Swedish Hockey League (SHL). Her father, Ola, is a former professional ice hockey player.

== Career statistics ==
=== Regular season and playoffs ===
			Regular season					Playoffs
Season	Team	League	GP	G	A	Pts	PIM	GP	G	A	Pts	PIM
2021–22	Modo Hockey	SDHL	31	4	10	14	4	2	0	0	0	4
2022–23	Modo Hockey	SDHL	30	5	7	12	16	5	0	1	1	2
2023–24	Modo Hockey	SDHL	32	9	17	26	14	10	1	5	6	6
2024–25	Modo Hockey	SDHL	35	7	17	24	10	5	1	0	1	0
SDHL totals			128	25	51	76	44	22	2	6	8	12

=== International ===
Year	Team	Event	Result	GP	G	A	Pts	PIM
2022	Sweden	U18	4th	6	1	1	2	4
2023	Sweden	U18	2nd place, silver medalist(s)	4	1	2	3	4
2023	Sweden	WC	6th	7	0	0	0	2
2024	Sweden	U18	5th	5	1	9	10	6
2024	Sweden	WC	7th	5	1	0	1	2
2025	Sweden	WC	6th	6	5	1	6	2
2026	Sweden	OG	4th	6	0	0	0	0
2026	Sweden	WC	3rd place, bronze medalist(s)	7	3	0	3	2
Junior totals				15	3	12	15	14
Senior totals				31	9	1	10	8
