= Emma Nuutinen =

Finnish ice hockey player (born 1996)

- Born: 7 December 1996 (age 29) Vantaa, Finland
- Height: 1.76 m (5 ft 9 in)
- Position: Right wing
- Shoots: Left
- PWHL team Former teams: Seattle Torrent: Kiekko-Espoo; Buffalo Beauts; Mercyhurst Lakers; UND Fighting Hawks; Espoo Blues
- National team: Finland
- Playing career: 2011–present
Medal record
Olympic Games
Bronze medal – third place	2018 Pyeongchang	Ice hockey
World Championships
Silver medal – second place	2019 Finland
Bronze medal – third place	2017 United States
Bronze medal – third place	2015 Sweden
Association football career
- Position: Forward
College career
Years	Team	Apps	(Gls)
2021	Lynn Fighting Knights	7	(2)

Emma Nuutinen (born 7 December 1996) is a Finnish ice hockey forward. She plays in the Professional Women's Hockey League (PWHL) with the Seattle Torrent.

As a member of the Finnish national ice hockey team, she participated in the Winter Olympic Games in 2014, 2018, and 2026, and won Olympic bronze at the 2018 Games.

== Playing career ==
Nuutinen began her NCAA Division I career in 2016–17, playing her freshman season with the North Dakota Fighting Hawks women's ice hockey program of the Western Collegiate Hockey Association (WCHA) conference. Forced to transfer after the University of North Dakota (UND) abruptly ended its women's ice hockey program following the 2016–17 season, Nuutinen and teammates Vilma Tanskanen and Kennedy Blair joined the Mercyhurst Lakers women's ice hockey program of the College Hockey America (CHA).

On 29 October 2020, the NHL shared a video across its social media platforms of Nuutinen performing a trick shot at the Käpylän urheilupuisto in Helsinki, which received a substantial and positive response. A day later, it was announced that Nuutinen had signed a contract with Kiekko-Espoo of the Naisten Liiga through the end of January 2021. She appeared in six games during the 2020–21 Naisten Liiga season, notching 7 goals and 5 assists (12).

In June 2026, Nuutinen signed a one-year standard player agreement with the Seattle Torrent for the 2026–27 PWHL season.

=== Association football ===
In 2021, Nuutinen played football for the Fighting Knights of Lynn University, scoring two goals and recording one assist in seven appearances for the team.

== International play ==
Nuutinen made three appearances for the Finland women's national under-18 ice hockey team, at the IIHF World Women's U18 Championships, with the first in 2012. In 2013, she was named a Media All Star as one of the top forwards in the tournament.

Nuutinen was selected to the Finnish national team for the 2014 Winter Olympics. She was the youngest player on the team. She played in all six games of the women's ice hockey tournament, scoring one goal. In 2018, she also appeared in all six games notching one goal and one assist.

Between Olympic appearances, Nuutinen has represented Finland in IIHF competition as part of the national team, earning World Championship bronze medals in 2015 and 2017. In 2019, she was a member of the historic silver medal-winning Finnish national team at the 2019 IIHF Women's World Championship, the first team to break the Canada-United States lock on World Championship gold and silver.

On 2 January 2026, she was named to Finland's roster to compete at the 2026 Winter Olympics.

== Personal life ==
Nuutinen is one of five siblings. As of the 2024–25 season, her younger sister Sofia (born 2002) plays with the Mercyhurst Lakers women's ice hockey program in the Atlantic Hockey America conference of the NCAA Division I. Her younger sister Ella (born 2000) played with the Espoo Blues and Espoo United of the Naisten SM-sarja before ending her hockey career after the 2016–17 season.

== Career statistics ==
=== Regular season and playoffs ===
			Regular season					Playoffs
Season	Team	League	GP	G	A	Pts	PIM	GP	G	A	Pts	PIM
2011–12	Kiekko-Vantaa U16	U16 I-div. Q	5	0	3	3	0	–	–	–	–	–
2011–12	Kiekko-Vantaa U16	U16 II-div.	8	1	3	4	0	–	–	–	–	–
2011–12	Espoo Blues	NSMs	9	3	4	7	2	9	9	2	11	8
2012–13	Espoo Blues	NSMs	20	14	11	25	6	9	4	7	11	6
2013–14	Espoo Blues	NSMs	25	24	30	54	8	8	4	3	7	4
2014–15	Espoo Blues	NSMs	12	9	16	25	8	6	5	4	9	0
2015–16	Espoo Blues	NSMs	20	28	26	54	18	6	2	6	8	2
2016–17	North Dakota Fighting Hawks	NCAA	34	10	9	19	4	–	–	–	–	–
2017–18	Mercyhurst Lakers	NCAA	23	8	5	13	14	–	–	–	–	–
2018–19	Mercyhurst Lakers	NCAA	30	16	12	28	34	–	–	–	–	–
2019–20	Mercyhurst Lakers	NCAA	34	21	19	40	12	–	–	–	–	–
2020–21	Kiekko-Espoo	NSML	6	7	5	12	4	–	–	–	–	—
2022–23	Buffalo Beauts	PHF	24	4	6	10	10	–	–	–	–	—
2023–24	Kiekko-Espoo	NSML	31	28	35	63	24	10	6	9	15	2
2024–25	Kiekko-Espoo	Auroraliiga	30	27	38	65	8	12	8	8	16	6
2025–26	Kiekko-Espoo	Auroraliiga	28	27	36	63	16	13	13	12	25	6
Auroraliiga totals			181	167	201	368	94	73	51	51	102	34
NCAA totals			121	55	45	100	64	–	–	–	–	–

Sources: Elite Prospects, Finnish Ice Hockey Association, USCHO

=== International ===
Year	Team	Event	Result	GP	G	A	Pts	PIM
2012	Finland	WC18	5th	5	1	1	2	4
2013	Finland	WC18	5th	5	5	3	8	10
2014	Finland	WC18	5th	5	3	4	7	2
2014	Finland	OG	5th	6	1	0	1	4
2015	Finland	WC	3rd place, bronze medalist(s)	6	0	1	1	4
2017	Finland	WC	3rd place, bronze medalist(s)	6	0	0	0	0
2018	Finland	OG	3rd place, bronze medalist(s)	6	1	1	2	0
2019	Finland	WC	2nd place, silver medalist(s)	6	0	0	0	2
2026	Finland	OG	6th	5	0	0	0	0
Junior totals				15	9	8	17	16
Senior totals				35	2	2	4	10

== Honours and achievements ==
Award	Year
International
World U18 Media All Star	2013
World U18 Top 3 Player on Team	2013
World Championship Bronze Medal	2015
World Championship Bronze Medal	2017
Olympic Bronze Medal	2018
World Championship Silver Medal	2019
Auroraliiga Naisten SM-sarja (1982–2017), Naisten Liiga (2017–2024)
Aurora Borealis Cup champion	2013
Aurora Borealis Cup champion	2014
Aurora Borealis Cup champion	2015
Aurora Borealis Cup champion	2025
Aurora Borealis Cup champion	2026
Noora Räty Award	2012–13
Karoliina Rantamäki Award	2012–13
Naisten SM-sarja All-Star	2013–14
Naisten SM-sarja All-Star	2015–16
Auroraliiga All-Star, First Team	2023–24
Auroraliiga All-Star, First Team	2024–25
Auroraliiga All-Star, First Team	2025–26
Player of the Month	February 2024
Player of the Month	September 2025
Marianne Ihalainen Award	2024–25
Marianne Ihalainen Award	2025–26
Kultainen kypärä	2024–25
Kultainen kypärä	2025–26
Riikka Nieminen Award	2024–25
Riikka Nieminen Award	2025–26
Tiia Reima Award	2025–26
Premier Hockey Federation
All-Star Game	2023 (Team World)
NCAA
WCHA Rookie of the Week	18 October 2016
WCHA Rookie of the Week	28 February 2017
CHA Tournament MVP	2017–18
CHA Player of the Week	29 October 2018
CHA Player of the Week	7 January 2019
CHA Player of the Week	27 January 2020
CHA Player of the Week	24 February 2020
CHA All-Conference First Team	2018–19
CHA All-Conference First Team	2019–20
NCAA No. 2 Star of the Week	8 January 2019
CHA Player of the Month	January 2019
CHA All Academic	2019–20
CHA Player of the Year	2019–20
