= Rhyah Stewart =

Canadian ice hockey player (born 2006)

- Stewart playing for the Wisconsin Badgers in 2026
- Born: November 23, 2006 (age 19) Antigonish, Nova Scotia, Canada
- Height: 5 ft 8 in (173 cm)
- Position: Goaltender
- Catches: Left
- NCAA team: University of Wisconsin

Rhyah Stewart (born November 23, 2006) is a Canadian college ice hockey player who is a goaltender for the University of Wisconsin of the National Collegiate Athletic Association (NCAA).

== Playing career ==
In the 2022–23 season, Stewart became the first woman to play for the Cape Breton West Islanders at the boys' under-18 'AAA' level. In 21 games, she recorded a save percentage of .899, the eighth best in the league, facing more shots and making more saves than any other goalie. Her performance earned her an invitation to the preseason camp of the Cape Breton Eagles of the Quebec Maritimes Junior Hockey League (QMJHL, then the Quebec Major Junior Hockey League).

While in training camp with Cape Breton, Stewart appeared in a preseason game, playing half the game and stopping all 24 shots she faced in a 5–3 loss to the Moncton Wildcats. Although other women have played in the QMJHL, Stewart was the first from the Maritimes and the first for the Eagles. Returning to the Islanders for the 2023–24 season, Stewart recorded a .913 save percentage in 18 games, earning second team all-star honours before improving to a .930 in 10 playoff games.

Entering the 2024–25 season, Stewart again attended Eagles training camp and again appeared in a preseason game. While at camp, she signed with the West Kent Steamers of the Maritime Junior Hockey League (MHL). Upon her debut for the Steamers, she became the second known female MHL player after goaltender Lisa Herritt in 1995–96. In her first MHL start on September 22, 2024, Stewart recorded a 39-save shutout in a 3–0 victory over the Grand Falls Rapids. After allowing just one goal in her following start, she was named MHL rookie of the month for September 2024. In ten games that season, she recorded a .903 save percentage.

Stewart joined the University of Wisconsin for the 2025–26 season, making her debut on October 4, 2025, halfway through the third period of a 5–0 victory over the University of Maine. In nine minutes of play, she stopped all three shots she faced.

== International play ==
Medal record

Women's ice hockey

Representing Canada

World U18 Championships
Bronze medal – third place	2024 Switzerland	

Representing Canada at the 2024 World U18 Championship, Stewart recorded a .950 save percentage and 0.67 goals against average, winning all three games she played. In a quarterfinal win against Switzerland, she recorded a three-save shutout. Although she was not in goal for Canada's semifinal upset loss to the Czech Republic, Stewart returned for the bronze medal match, where she backstopped an 8–1 victory over Finland to claim third place.

== Personal life ==
Stewart is from Antigonish, Nova Scotia. She has three brothers.

== Career statistics ==
=== Regular season and playoffs ===
Note: GP = Games played; Min, TOI = Minutes played; W = Wins; L = Losses; T,T/OT = Ties; OTL = Overtime losses; GA = Goals-against; GAA = Goals-against average; SO = Shutouts; SV% = Save percentage;

			Regular season									Playoffs
Season	Team	League	GP	W	L	T/OT	MIN	GA	SO	GAA	SV%	GP	W	L	MIN	GA	SO	GAA	SV%
2024–25	West Kent Steamers	MHL	10	6	3	0	567	30	1	3.17	.903	—	—	—	—	—	—	—	—
MHL totals			10	6	3	0	567	30	1	3.17	.903	—	—	—	—	—	—	—	—

=== International ===
Note: GP = Games played; Min, TOI = Minutes played; W = Wins; L = Losses; T,T/OT = Ties; OTL = Overtime losses; GA = Goals-against; GAA = Goals-against average; SO = Shutouts; SV% = Save percentage;

				Regular season
Year	Team	Event	Result	GP	W	L	T/OT	MIN	GA	SO	GAA	SV%
2024	Canada	U18	3rd place, bronze medalist(s)	3	3	0	0	180	2	1	0.67	.950
Junior totals				3	3	0	0	180	2	1	0.67	.950
