= Noora Räty Award =

Finnish ice hockey award

Noora Räty Award Noora Räty -palkinto (Finnish)
- Sport: Ice hockey
- League: Auroraliiga
- Awarded for: Rookie of the Year
- Presented by: Finnish Ice Hockey Association

History
- First award: 2006
- First winner: Noora Räty
- Most recent: Yenna Kolmonen (2026)

The Noora Räty Award (Finnish: Noora Räty -palkinto) is an ice hockey trophy awarded to the Rookie of the Year of the Auroraliiga (previously called the Naisten SM-sarja and Naisten Liiga), as selected by the Finnish Ice Hockey Association. Rookie of the Year was first awarded in the 2005–06 Naisten SM-sarja season and the first recipient was Espoo Blues Naiset rookie goaltender Noora Räty. Since her rookie season, Räty has established herself as a top goaltender – considered by many to be one of the best women’s goaltenders in the world. The Naisten SM-sarja Rookie of the Year award was named after Räty in the 2010–11 season.

Twenty players have received the award – thirteen forwards, five defensemen, and two goaltenders. The current title holder is Emmi Loponen of Kärpät, who was recognized for her play in the 2025–26 Auroraliiga season.

== Award winners ==
Season	Player	Pos	Team
2005–06	Noora Räty	G	Espoo Blues
2006–07	Emmi Leinonen	F	Cats Jyväskylä
2007–08	—N/a		
2008–09	Tiina Saarimäki	D	Salo HT
2009–10	Karoliina Mäenpänen	D	APV Alavus
2010–11	Venla Kotkaslahti	F	Ilves Tampere
2011–12	Suvi Ollikainen	F	Team Oriflame Kuortane
2012–13	Emma Nuutinen	F	Espoo Blues
2013–14	Marjut Klemola	D	KJT Haukat
2014–15	Ella Välikangas	F	Kärpät Oulu
2015–16	Petra Nieminen	F	Team Kuortane
2016–17	Elvira Ylitalo	F	HPK Hämeenlinna
2017–18	Anna-Lotta Räsänen	D	Team Kuortane
2018–19	Ida Kuoppala	F	Sport Vaasa
2019–20	Krista Parkkonen	F	IFK Helsinki
2020–21	Anna-Kaisa Antti-Roiko	F	Kärpät Oulu
2021–22	Tuuli Tallinen	D	Team Kuortane
2022–23	Sanni Vanhanen	F	IFK Helsinki
2023–24	Kerttu Kuja-Halkola	G	Team Kuortane
2024–25	Yenna Kolmonen	F	Team Kuortane
2025–26	Emmi Loponen	F	Kärpät Oulu
