= Mackenzie Alexander =

Canadian ice hockey player (born 2006)

- Born: July 29, 2006 (age 20) Etobicoke, Ontario, Canada
- Height: 5 ft 6 in (168 cm)
- Position: Forward
- Shoots: Right
- NCAA team: Princeton
- Playing career: 2024–present

Mackenzie Alexander (born July 29, 2006) is a Canadian college ice hockey forward for Princeton of the National Collegiate Athletic Association (NCAA).

== Early life ==
Alexander was born to Linda Leung and Dennis Alexander, and has a brother, Reid. She attended Newton's Grove School, a private school in Mississauga, Ontario. She played junior ice hockey for the Etobicoke Jr. Dolphins Ontario Women's Hockey League (OWHL). During the 2023–24 season, she recorded 58 goals and 45 assists in 39 games and helped lead the Dolphins to a 40–0–0–1 regular season record.

She represented Ontario Red at the 2023 Canadian U-18 women's national championships, where she recorded five goals and four assists in six games and won a gold medal. She was named the tournament's most sportsmanlike player. She scored the game-winning goal in overtime against Quebec during the gold medal game.

== College career ==
Alexander began her collegiate career for Princeton during the 2024–25 season. On October 18, 2024, during her debut, she recorded one goal and two assists in a game against Robert Morris. The next day, she again scored one goal and two assists, including a short-handed goal. She finished the weekend series with two goals and four assists. During her first month with the team, she recorded three goals and four assists in four games for the Tigers. She tied for the team lead in points and assists and was named the ECAC Rookie of the Month. On November 30, 2024, in a game against Stonehill she recorded six assists, the most in a single game since 2005, and tied for the second-most in a game in program history. During the month of November, she recorded five goals and 17 assists in nine games and was again named ECAC Rookie of the Month, and Hockey Commissioner's Association Rookie of the Month. During the month of December, she recorded one goal and two assists in two games and was named ECAC Rookie of the Month for the third time in her career, and Hockey Commissioner's Association Rookie of the Month for the second consecutive month. Following the season she was named to the ECAC Hockey All-Rookie team. She led all freshmen in the NCAA in points (46) and assists (32).

== International play ==
Medal record

Representing Canada

Ice hockey

World U18 Championship
Gold medal – first place	2023 Sweden	
Bronze medal – third place	2024 Switzerland	

Alexander represented Canada at the 2023 IIHF World Women's U18 Championship where she recorded one goal and one assist in five games and won a gold medal. She again represented Canada at the 2024 IIHF World Women's U18 Championship where she recorded two goals and four assists in six games and won a bronze medal.

== Career statistics ==
=== Regular season and playoffs ===
			Regular season					Playoffs
Season	Team	League	GP	G	A	Pts	PIM	GP	G	A	Pts	PIM
2021–22	Etobicoke Jr. Dolphins	OWHL	28	10	4	14	4	—	—	—	—	—
2022–23	Etobicoke Jr. Dolphins	OWHL	40	17	30	47	12	—	—	—	—	—
2023–24	Etobicoke Jr. Dolphins	OWHL	39	58	45	103	12	—	—	—	—	—
2024–25	Princeton University	ECAC	32	14	32	46	4	—	—	—	—	—
NCAA totals			32	14	32	46	4	—	—	—	—	—

=== International ===
Year	Team	Event	Result	GP	G	A	Pts	PIM
2023	Canada	U18	1st place, gold medalist(s)	5	1	1	2	8
2024	Canada	U18	3rd place, bronze medalist(s)	6	2	4	6	2
Junior totals				11	3	5	8	10
