= Mira Hallin =

Swedish ice hockey player (born 2006)

- Born: 24 April 2006 (age 20) Örnsköldsvik, Sweden
- Height: 167 cm (5 ft 6 in)
- Weight: 63 kg (139 lb; 9 st 13 lb)
- Position: Forward
- Shoots: Right
- SDHL team: Modo Hockey
- National team: Sweden
- Playing career: 2021–present
Medal record
World Championship
Bronze medal – third place	2026 Denmark
World U18 Championship
Silver medal – second place	2023 Sweden

Mira Hallin (born 24 April 2006) is a Swedish ice hockey forward for Modo Hockey of the Swedish Women's Hockey League (SDHL) and a member of Sweden women's national ice hockey team.

== Playing career ==
Hallin began her career with Modo Hockey of the SDHL during the 2021–22 season at 15 years old. On 2 August 2023, she signed a two-year contract extension with Modo. On 2 April 2025, she signed a two-year extension with Modo.

== International play ==
Hallin represented Sweden at the 2022 European Youth Olympic Winter Festival and recorded one goal and two assists in three games, and won a silver medal. She then represented Sweden at the 2023 IIHF U18 Women's World Championship and recorded one goal and three assists in six games and won a silver medal. She again competed at the 2024 IIHF U18 Women's World Championship and recorded three goals and five assists in five games.

She then made her senior national team debut for Sweden during the 2024 IIHF Women's World Championship at 17 years old. During the tournament she recorded two assists in five games. She again represented Sweden at the 2025 IIHF Women's World Championship and recorded two goals and one assist in six games.

On 12 January 2026, she was named to Sweden's roster to compete at the 2026 Winter Olympics.

On 20 October 2026, she was selected to represent Sweden at the 2026 IIHF Women's World Championship. She helped Sweden win their first IIHF Women's World Championship medal since 2007.

== Career statistics ==
=== Regular season and playoffs ===
			Regular season					Playoffs
Season	Team	League	GP	G	A	Pts	PIM	GP	G	A	Pts	PIM
2021–22	Modo Hockey	SDHL	34	3	5	8	4	2	1	0	1	0
2022–23	Modo Hockey	SDHL	28	3	2	5	2	5	0	0	0	0
2023–24	Modo Hockey	SDHL	32	9	5	14	18	10	4	1	5	4
2024–25	Modo Hockey	SDHL	32	8	8	16	8	5	2	2	4	2
SDHL totals			151	28	26	54	44	22	7	3	10	6

=== International ===
Year	Team	Event	Result	GP	G	A	Pts	PIM
2023	Sweden	U18	2nd place, silver medalist(s)	6	1	3	4	4
2024	Sweden	U18	5th	5	3	5	8	2
2024	Sweden	WC	7th	5	0	2	2	0
2025	Sweden	WC	6th	6	2	1	3	2
2026	Sweden	OG	4th	7	1	0	1	0
2026	Sweden	WC	3rd place, bronze medalist(s)	7	0	1	1	2
Junior totals				11	4	8	12	6
Senior totals				25	3	4	9	4
