= Tuuli Tallinen =

Finnish ice hockey player (born 2006)

- Born: 10 June 2006 (age 20) Kouvola, Finland
- Height: 5 ft 10 in (178 cm)
- Weight: 165 lb (75 kg; 11 st 11 lb)
- Position: Defense
- Shoots: Left
- NCAA team Former teams: Minnesota Duluth; Team Kuortane; HPK Kiekkonaiset
- National team: Finland
- Playing career: 2021–present

Tuuli Tallinen (born 10 June 2006) is a Finnish college ice hockey player for Minnesota Duluth and a member of Finland women's national ice hockey team. She previously played for Team Kuortane and HPK Kiekkonaiset of the Naisten Liiga.

== Early life ==
Tallinen was born to Tero and Kirsi Tallinen, and has two brothers, Iiro and Turo. She graduated from Kuortane High School in 2025.

== Playing career ==
Tallinen began her ice hockey career for Team Kuortane of the Naisten Liiga. During the 2021–22 season, she recorded three assists in 25 regular season games. Following the season she was named the Noora Räty Award winner, as the league's best rookie. During the 2022–23 season, she recorded four goals and nine assists in 33 regular season games. During the 2023–24 season, she recorded two goals and two assists in 27 regular season games.

During the 2024–25 season, she recorded ten goals and 13 assists in 30 regular season games. During the 2025 Aurora Borealis Cup playoffs she recorded one goal and three assists in ten games. Following the season she named to the Auroraliiga First All-Star team. She joined HPK Kiekkonaiset for the 2025–26 season and recorded two goals and 13 assists in 27 regular season games.

On November 17, 2025, she signed her National Letter of Intent to play college ice hockey at Minnesota Duluth during the 2026–27 season.

== International play ==
Medal record

Representing Finland

World U18 Championship
Bronze medal – third place	2022 United States	

Tallinen represented Finland at the 2022 IIHF World Women's U18 Championship and won a bronze medal. She again represented Finland at the 2023 IIHF World Women's U18 Championship. She served as captain for Finland at the 2024 IIHF World Women's U18 Championship and recorded five assists in six games. She was subsequently named to the Media All-Star Team.

On 31 October 2026, she was named to the roster for Finland at the 2026 IIHF Women's World Championship, where she will make her senior national team debut.

== Career statistics ==
=== Regular season and playoffs ===
			Regular season					Playoffs
Season	Team	League	GP	G	A	Pts	PIM	GP	G	A	Pts	PIM
2021–22	Team Kuortane	NSML	25	0	3	3	14	—	—	—	—	—
2022–23	Team Kuortane	NSML	33	4	9	13	12	4	1	0	1	2
2023–24	Team Kuortane	NSML	27	2	2	4	20	—	—	—	—	—
2024–25	Team Kuortane	NSML	30	10	13	23	4	10	1	3	4	0
2025–26	HPK Kiekkonaiset	NSML	27	2	13	15	6	10	1	3	4	2
NSML totals			142	18	40	58	56	24	3	6	9	4

=== International ===
Year	Team	Event	Result	GP	G	A	Pts	PIM
2022	Finland	U18	3rd place, bronze medalist(s)	5	0	0	0	2
2023	Finland	U18	4th	6	0	0	0	2
2024	Finland	U18	4th	6	0	5	5	0
Junior totals				17	0	5	5	4

== Awards and honors ==
Award	Year
Auroraliiga
Noora Räty Award	2022
All-Star First Team	2025
International
World U18 Championship Media All-Star Team	2024
