= Hanna Hoppe =

German ice hockey player (born 2006)

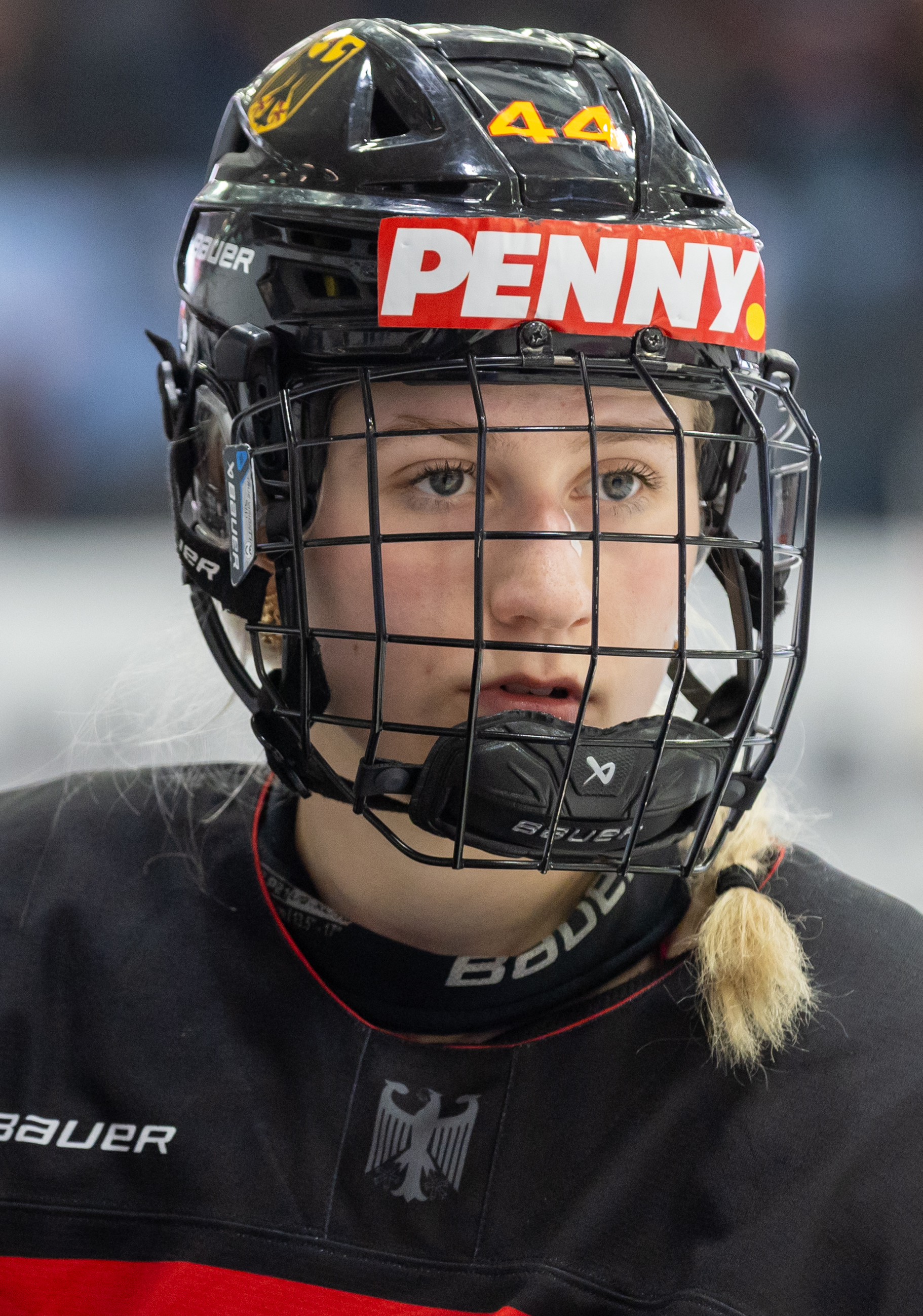
- Hoppe in 2026
- Born: 23 August 2006 (age 20) Dresden, Germany
- Height: 1.64 m (5 ft 5 in)
- Weight: 62 kg (137 lb; 9 st 11 lb)
- Position: Defense
- Shoots: Left
- DFEL team: Eisbaren Juniors Berlin
- National team: Germany
- Playing career: 2020–present

Hanna Hoppe (born 23 August 2006) is a German ice hockey player. She is a member of the Germany women's national ice hockey team that participated in women's ice hockey tournament at the 2026 Winter Olympics.

== Playing career ==
=== International ===
Hoppe was a member of the German roster that won the gold medal at the 2023 IIHF U18 Women's World Championship Division I, Group A competition.

With Germany making their first appearance in women's ice hockey at the Olympics since 2014, the 5 February 2026 match versus Sweden meant that every member of the German roster were making their Olympic debut. Hoppe, wearing number 44, logged 11:51 minutes of ice time in a 4–1 loss to Sweden.
