= Matilda Nilsson =

Finnish ice hockey player

- Born: 2 March 1997 (age 29) Kirkkonummi, Finland
- Height: 164 cm (5 ft 5 in)
- Weight: 60 kg (132 lb; 9 st 6 lb)
- Position: Wing
- Shoots: Left
- Auroraliiga team Former teams: Ilves Tampere: Frölunda HC; Brynäs IF; IFK Helsinki; KalPa Kuopio; KJT Haukat
- National team: Finland
- Playing career: 2010–present
Medal record
World Championship
Bronze medal – third place	2021 Canada

Matilda Nilsson (born 2 March 1997) is a Finnish ice hockey player, a winger. She has played in the Auroraliiga with the Tampereen Ilves since September 2024. As a member of the Finnish national ice hockey team, she won a bronze medal at the 2021 IIHF Women's World Championship.

== Playing career ==
Nilsson grew up in Kirkkonummi, a municipality in the western Greater Helsinki region, where she began playing ice hockey at age 5. Her youth club was HC Salamat and she played on boys’ teams throughout her childhood until age 16. Regarding the experience, she has said, "I am so grateful that I got to play in boys'. The differences [from women's hockey] can be seen in the physicality and doggedness. A different kind of hockey intelligence came from the games."

While playing with Salamat's boys' teams, she also joined the women's representative team of Keski-Uudenmaan Juniorikiekkoilun Tuki (KJT) in Kerava and made her senior league debut at age thirteen in the 2010–11 season of the Naisten Suomi-sarja, the third-tier women's national league in Finland. She played eleven games in the qualification series, contributing fifteen points (7 goals + 8 assists) as the team gained promotion to the second-tier Naisten I-divisioona (renamed Naisten Mestis in 2012).

Remaining with the KJT in the following season, she ranked third on the team for scoring across the regular season and qualifiers, with 23 points in twenty games. In the 2012–13 Naisten Mestis season, she recorded nearly two points per game, with 44 points (26+19) in 23 games, ranking third of KJT players and fifth in the league overall. Nilsson's performance, in addition to phenomenal seasons posted by many KJT players – most notably Noora Tulus (77 points), Tinja Haukijärvi (45 points), and Emmi Rakkolainen (41 points) – helped the team gain promotion yet again, this time to the top-tier Naisten SM-sarja (called Naisten Liiga during 2017–2024; renamed Auroraliiga in 2024).

KJT struggled against the higher compete-level of the Naisten SM-sarja and finished the 2013–14 regular season at the bottom of the standings, with a goal differential of -134. Despite the challenges, several players had solid seasons, none more so than Nilsson who scored over a quarter of KJT's goals and led the team in scoring, with 23 points in 27 games. KJT was able to save themselves from relegation in the qualifiers, thanks in part to the nineteen points Nilsson contributed across the ten-game series. Before the 2014–15 Naisten SM-sarja season, seventeen year old Nilsson moved over 400 km (250 mi) away from home to sign with KalPa Naiset in Kuopio.

Nilsson began the 2022–23 season with the men's U17 squad of HC Salamat. She played one match with the team before signing in the Swedish Women's Hockey League (SDHL) with Brynäs IF. Across 27 games with Brynäs in the 2022–23 SDHL season, she scored sixteen goals and twelve assists for 28 points. Her point total ranked fifth on the team and she tied with Maja Nylén Persson for third-most goals scored, behind only Lara Stalder and Anna Meixner.

She entered the 2023–24 SDHL season without a contract and did not play until October, when she signed with Frölunda HC to fill the gap left when the team's captain, Hanna Olsson, was sidelined by a season-ending hamstring injury. She ranked fifth on the team for scoring, with seven goals and nine assists for sixteen points across 27 games.

== International play ==
Nilsson played with the Finnish national U18 team at the 2014 IIHF World Women's U18 Championship, where Finland placed fifth.

At age sixteen, Nilsson was invited to join the senior national team but was committed to other interests at the time and choose not to pursue the opportunity.

She represented Finland at the 2018 4 Nations Cup and at several Euro Hockey Tour tournaments in the 2018–19 and 2019–20 seasons.

Nilsson was officially named to the Finnish roster for the 2020 IIHF Women's World Championship on 4 March 2020, before the tournament was cancelled on 7 March 2020 due to public health concerns related to the COVID-19 pandemic.

== Personal life ==
Nilsson was born on 2 March 1997 to a family of Swedish-Finns, a culturally distinct group of people born in Finland speaking Swedish as their first language. Her parents, Camilla and Toni, run Varuboden Areena in Kirkkonummi, the home venue of HC Salamat. During Nilsson's youth, her father worked as a police officer.

Hockey Hall of Fame-inductee Hayley Wickenheiser lived with the Nilsson family while playing with Salamat during the 2002–03 season and 2003–04 season. Nilsson recalled "following her everywhere" as a five year old, watching what Wickenheiser did at the rink and in the locker room and adopting those habits, some of which have stuck with Nilsson into her senior career. The two women continue to communicate on a regular basis and Nilsson describes Wickenheiser as having played a significant role in her career.

Former NHLer Teemu Selänne, who was a partial owner of HC Salamat until 2006, is also a family friend of the Nilsson's and further inspired Nilsson to pursue hockey.

Nilsson has been in a relationship with former footballer Nea Aho, who last played with Kuopion Palloseura (KuPS) in the 2019 season of the Naisten Liiga (renamed Kansallinen Liiga in 2020). The couple planned to relocate to Sweden in the summer of 2020 so Nilsson could sign with a SDHL team but they altered course and chose to remain in Finland as the COVID-19 pandemic created uncertainty and other challenges. They were able to realize their goal in 2022, when Nilsson signed in the SDHL, and resided in Sweden during the two seasons she was active in the league.

Nilsson moved back to Finland in August 2024. At that time, Nilsson shared that she had applied to Police University College (Polamk) and, though she had not yet received the results of her entrance exam, she hoped to enroll and complete her schooling in Finland before she would consider playing ice hockey abroad again.

Nilsson previously worked as a kindergarten classroom assistant in Kuopio and also considered pursuing a career in nursing.

== Career statistics ==
=== Regular season and postseason ===
			Regular season					Postseason
Season	Team	League	GP	G	A	Pts	PIM	GP	G	A	Pts	PIM
2010–11	KJT	Naisten Suomi-sarja	3	0	2	2	0	11	7	8	15	6
2011–12	KJT	Naisten 1-div.	9	11	4	15	2	11	5	3	8	2
2012–13	KJT	Naisten Mestis	13	17	14	31	4	10	9	4	13	6
2013–14	KJT	NSMs	27	13	10	23	16	10*	9*	10*	19*	4*
2014–15	KalPa	NSMs	28	24	10	34	16	3	0	2	2	0
2015–16	KalPa	NSMs	28	21	5	26	12	2	1	1	2	0
2016–17	KalPa	NSMs	25	17	17	34	18	9	5	4	9	2
2017–18	KalPa	NSML	27	21	18	39	20	4	1	1	2	4
2018–19	KalPa	NSML	30	39	35	74	16	8	6	5	11	10
2019–20	KalPa	NSML	29	23	31	54	34	8	5	2	7	4
2020–21	KalPa	NSML	22	19	24	43	10	11	3	3	6	12
2021–22	HIFK	NSML	29	37	18	55	22	12	5	5	10	6
2022–23	Salamat U17	U17 Suomi-sarja	1	0	1	1	0	–	–	–	–	—
2022–23	Brynäs IF	SDHL	27	16	12	28	8	8	4	2	6	4
2023–24	Frölunda HC	SDHL	27	7	9	16	10	8	1	2	3	6
Auroraliiga totals			245	214	168	382	164	57	26	23	49	38
SDHL totals			54	23	21	44	18	16	5	4	9	10

* Postseason results for the 2013–14 season are from the Naisten SM-sarja qualification series (Finnish: Karsintasarja) rather than the playoffs and are not calculated with playoff totals.

Sources: Finnish Ice Hockey Association, Elite Prospects

=== International ===
Year	Team	Event	Result	GP	G	A	Pts	PIM
2014	Finland	WW18	5th	5	2	3	5	0
2018	Finland	4NC	3rd	4	1	0	1	4
2021	Finland	WC	3rd place, bronze medalist(s)	2	0	0	0	0
Junior totals				5	2	3	5	0
Senior totals				6	1	0	1	4

Sources: IIHF, Hockey Canada

== Awards and honors ==
Award	Year
Auroraliiga
First All-Star Team	2015, 2020, 2021
Second All-Star Team	2018, 2019, 2022
Player of the Month	September 2019
Sari Fisk Award (Best plus/minus)	2020
Tiia Reima Award (Most goals)	2021, 2022
Finnish Championship Silver Medal	2022
SDHL
Swedish Championship Silver Medal	2023
