= Emma Ekoluoma =

Finnish ice hockey player (born 2006)

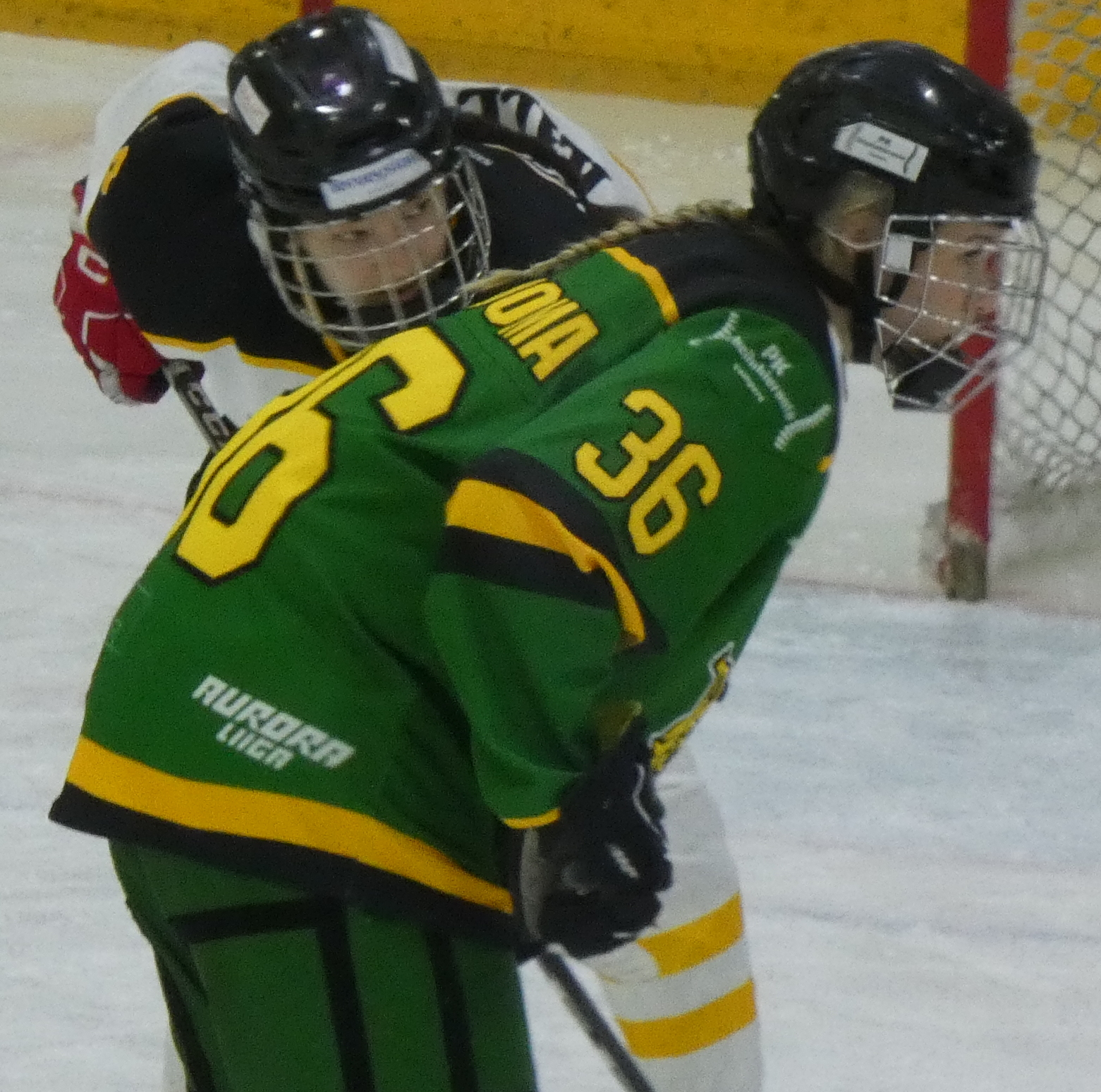
- Ekoluoma with Ilves in 2025
- Born: 20 January 2006 (age 20) Raahe, Finland
- Height: 5 m (16 ft 5 in)
- Weight: 157 kg (346 lb; 24 st 10 lb)
- Position: Forward
- Shoots: Left
- Auroraliiga team Former teams: Ilves Tampere; Kärpät Oulu
- National team: Finland
- Playing career: 2021–present

Emma Ekoluoma (born 20 January 2006) is a Finnish ice hockey player for Ilves Naiset of the Auroraliiga and a member of Finland women's national ice hockey team. She previously played for Kärpät Naiset.

== Playing career ==
Ekoluoma began her ice hockey career for Kärpät. During the 2022–23 season, she recorded 12 goals and 12 assists in 36 regular season games. During the 2023–24 season, she recorded 16 goals and 11 assists in 31 regular season games. Following the season she was named to the Naisten Liiga Second All-Star team. She joined Ilves Naiset for the 2024–25 season, where she recorded 16 goals and 17 assists in 32 games. She represented Finland at the 2024–25 Women's Euro Hockey Tour, following an injury to Michelle Karvinen.

== International play ==
Medal record

Representing Finland

World Championships
| Bronze medal – third place | 2025 Czechia | |

Ekoluoma represented Finland at the 2023 IIHF U18 Women's World Championship where she recorded one assist in six games. She again represented Finland at the 2024 IIHF U18 Women's World Championship, where she led the team in scoring with eight goals and three assists in six games. On 6 January 2024, in the first preliminary round game against Czechia, she recorded a hat-trick in the final 24 minutes of the game. The next day against Germany she recorded her second hat-trick of the tournament. She finished the tournament with 11 points, setting a record for the most points by a Finnish player in a single IIHF U18 Women's World Championship. She was subsequently named to the Media All-Star Team.

On 26 March 2025, she was selected to represent Finland at the 2025 IIHF Women's World Championship, where she made her senior national team debut.

== Career statistics ==
=== Regular season and playoffs ===
| | | | Regular season | | | | | Playoffs |
| Season | Team | League | GP | G | A | Pts | PIM | GP | G | A | Pts | PIM |
|---|---|---|---|---|---|---|---|---|---|---|---|---|
| 2021–22 | Kärpät | NSML | 21 | 7 | 5 | 12 | 6 | 7 | 0 | 1 | 1 | 0 |
| 2022–23 | Kärpät | NSML | 36 | 12 | 12 | 24 | 18 | 3 | 0 | 0 | 0 | 2 |
| 2023–24 | Kärpät | NSML | 31 | 16 | 11 | 27 | 10 | 3 | 2 | 1 | 3 | 0 |
| 2024–25 | Ilves | Auroraliiga | 32 | 16 | 17 | 33 | 20 | 10 | 3 | 4 | 7 | 8 |
| Auroraliiga totals | | | 120 | 51 | 45 | 96 | 54 | 23 | 5 | 6 | 11 | 10 |

=== International ===
| Year | Team | Event | Result | GP | G | A | Pts | PIM |
|---|---|---|---|---|---|---|---|---|
| 2023 | Finland | U18 | 4th | 6 | 0 | 1 | 1 | 2 |
| 2024 | Finland | U18 | 4th | 6 | 8 | 3 | 11 | 4 |
| 2025 | Finland | WC | 3rd place, bronze medalist(s) | 5 | 0 | 0 | 0 | 0 |
| Junior totals | | | | 12 | 8 | 4 | 12 | 6 |
| Senior totals | | | | 5 | 0 | 0 | 0 | 0 |

== Awards and honors ==
| Award | Year |
Naisten Liiga
| All-Star Second Team | 2024 |
International
| World U18 Championship Media All-Star Team | 2024 |
