= Abigail Byskata =

Finnish ice hockey player (born 2007)

- Born: 7 May 2007 (age 19) Cebu, Philippines
- Height: 153 cm (5 ft 0 in)
- Position: Right wing
- Shoots: Right
- Auroraliiga team: Team Kuortane

Abigail Byskata (born 7 May 2007) is a Finnish ice hockey player and an alternate captain of Team Kuortane in the Auroraliiga.

== Playing career ==
Byskata developed in the junior ice hockey department of Terjärv Ungdoms Sportklubb (TUS) in her hometown of Terjärv, a small town in the Kronoby municipality of Ostrobothnia on the west coast of Finland. She began competing in the national E2 (under-11 or U11) league with TUS E2 AA (see minor ice hockey) in 2015 and remained with the team through 2017. In the 2017–18 season, she played with the TUS teams in the E2 AA, E1 A (U12 A), and E1 AA (U12 AA) leagues. The 2018–19 season was played with TUS D2 AA and Byskata recorded 21 goals and 12 assists for 33 points in 21 games played, ranking second on the team for points.

=== International play ===
Byskata made her debut with the Finnish national under-18 ice hockey team at the 2023 IIHF World Women's U18 Championship. At fifteen years old, she was the youngest skater in the Finnish lineup. She played in all six games but did not record a point.

At the 2023 European Youth Olympic Winter Festival, Byskata captained the Finnish national under-16 team in the girls' ice hockey tournament. She tied Jannika Sten as top goal-scorer on the team, with three goals, and ranked third on the team and fourteenth of all tournament skaters for points. In the third place game against Sweden, Byskata netted the only goal of the shootout to secure a bronze medal victory for Finland.

Byskata served as an alternate captain to the national under-18 team at the 2024 IIHF U18 Women's World Championship. She was selected as Finland's player of the game in the match against Germany and her two goals and eight points across six games ranked second on the Finnish team for points and tied for sixteenth of all tournament skaters (four-way tie with Anežka Čabelová of Czechia, and Mary Derrenbacher and Morgan McGathey of the United States).

== Personal life ==
Byskata was born 7 May 2007 in Cebu, Philippines. At age two, she was adopted into a family of Swedish-speaking Finns and was thereafter raised in Terjärv, Finland.

Byskata has also played association football with TUS teams and participated in athletics and orienteering competitions.

== Career statistics ==
=== International ===
Year	Team	Event	Result	GP	G	A	Pts	PIM
2022	Finland U16	EC16	3rd place, bronze medalist(s)	4	0	0	0	0
2023	Finland U18	WC18	4th	6	0	0	0	0
2023	Finland U16	EYOF	3rd place, bronze medalist(s)	4	3	1	4	0
2024	Finland U18	WC18	4th	6	2	6	8	2
2025	Finland U18	WC18	6th	4	0	1	1	0
