= Kerttu Kuja-Halkola =

Finnish ice hockey player (born 2007)

- Born: 2 September 2007 (age 19) Janakkala, Finland
- Height: 1.76 m (5 ft 9 in)
- Weight: 72 kg (159 lb; 11 st 5 lb)
- Position: Goaltender
- Catches: Left
- Auroraliiga team Former teams: IFK Helsinki; Team Kuortane
- National team: Finland
- Playing career: 2023–present

Kerttu Kuja-Halkola (born 2 September 2007) is a Finnish ice hockey goaltender for IFK Helsinki of the Auroraliiga and a member of Finland women's national ice hockey team. She previously played for Team Kuortane.

== Playing career ==
On 1 August 2023, she joined Team Kuortane of the Naisten Liiga (NSML). As a rookie during the 2023–24 season, she posted a 4–9–0 record, with 2.59 goals-against average (GAA) and .912 save percentage. Following the season she was recognized as the league's best rookie with the Noora Räty Award. She was also named to the Naisten Liiga Second All-Star team. During the 2024–25 season, she posted an 11–5–0 record, with a 1.83 GAA and .909 save percentage. During the 2025–26 season, she posted an 10–5–0 record, with a 1.95 GAA and .930 save percentage.

At age eighteen, Kuja-Halkola relocated to Helsinki in order to join IFK Helsinki for the 2026–27 season. On 24 October 2026, she posted a shutout against her former team, Kuortane.

== International play ==
As a youth player with the Finnish national under-18 team, Kuja-Halkola was the starting goaltender for three consecutive IIHF U18 Women's World Championship tournaments. She made her international debut at the 2023 IIHF U18 Women's World Championship and was the tournament's youngest goalie to play sixty or more minutes in net. The fifteen year old recorded more minutes than any other goaltender in the tournament, faced the most shots on net, and posted the most saves in the tournament – 65 more saves than the next ranked goalie.

Kuja-Halkola was also the time on ice leader at the 2024 IIHF U18 Women's World Championship and tallied the second-most saves. After backstopping Finland to the bronze medal game for the second consecutive year, she was named a top-three player on the team as selected by the coaches. She again represented Finland at the 2025 IIHF U18 Women's World Championship.

She was named to the Finnish senior national team at the 2026 IIHF Women's World Championship and served as the third netminder behind starter Sanni Ahola and backup Emilia Kyrkkö.

== Awards and honors ==
Award	Year
Auroraliiga
Noora Räty Award	2024
All-Star Second Team	2024
