= Anni Montonen =

Finnish ice hockey player (born 2000)

- Born: 7 May 2000 (age 26) Espoo, Finland
- Height: 169 cm (5 ft 7 in)
- Weight: 60 kg (132 lb; 9 st 6 lb)
- Position: Forward
- Shoots: Left
- Auroraliiga team Former teams: Kiekko-Espoo; HV71; Espoo Blues
- National team: Finland
- Playing career: 2017–present

Anni-Elina Montonen (born 7 May 2000) is a Finnish ice hockey player and member of the Finnish national team. She plays in the Auroraliiga with Kiekko-Espoo.

== Playing career ==
As a youth, Montonen developed in the minor ice hockey department of Jäähonka, an ice hockey club in her home-city of Espoo in Greater Helsinki on the south coast of Finland. In 2015, she began playing with Blues EKS teams, which were the products of a partnership between the Espoon Kiekkoseura (EKS) and Espoo Blues ice hockey clubs.

Montonen spent most of 2016–17 playing with the Blues EKS under-18 (U18) team in the B/C-tyttöjen aluesarja (lit. 'U18/U16 girls' regional series') and she led the team in scoring with 9 goals and 20 points in fourteen games. In the same season, she made her senior league debut with Blues EKS in the Naisten Suomi-sarja and tallied 3 goals and an assist in two games played with the team.

In the 2017–18 season, she led the B/C-tyttöjen aluesarja in goals and ranked second in the league for points, tallying 23 goals and 31 points in seventeen games. Montonen also played a single game each in the Naisten Liiga with the Espoo Blues and in the Naisten Suomi-sarja with Salo HT.

=== Naisten Liiga ===
Her Naisten Liiga career began in earnest in the 2018–19 season, during which she played sixteen regular season games with the Espoo Blues, notching a goal and five assists, and won her first Aurora Borealis Cup with the team. The Espoo Blues were renamed as Kiekko-Espoo ahead of the 2019–20 Naisten Liiga season and Montonen remained on the roster through the transition.

Over the following four seasons with Kiekko-Espoo, she won two more Finnish Championships and made major strides in her development, increasing her point from just one assist across ten games during the 2019–20 season to 42 points (21+21) across 34 games of the 2022–23 season. Both her regular season goals and regular season points ranked tenth in the league for the 2022–23 season and she led all Kiekko-Espoo players in scoring.

=== SDHL ===
Montonen entered her first international contract in June 2023, signing in the Swedish Women's Hockey League (SDHL) with HV71, based in Jönköping, Sweden. She joined a roster that also featured fellow Finnish national team players Sanni Hakala, Anni Keisala, Emmi Rakkolainen, and Kiira Yrjänen.

== International play ==
Montonen received her first invitation to play with the national team at age 22 and was selected to participate in every game of the 2022–23 Euro Hockey Tour. She recorded her first international point on a goal against Germany at the EHT Five Nations Tournament in Ängelholm, with assists from Jenna Kaila and Emmi Rakkolainen. The season culminated in her World Championship debut at the 2023 IIHF Women's World Championship, where she played on the fourth-line with Emmi Rakkolainen and Anna-Kaisa Antti-Roiko.
