= 2025 WCHA women's ice hockey tournament =

2025 WCHA Women's ice hockey tournament
- 2025 WCHA Final Faceoff logo
- Dates: February 28 – March 8, 2025
- Teams: 8
- Finals site: AMSOIL Arena; Duluth, Minnesota
- Champions: Wisconsin (11th title)
- Winning coach: Mark Johnson (11th title)
- MVP: Casey O'Brien (Wisconsin)
- WCHA Women's Ice Hockey Tournaments

The 2025 WCHA Ice Hockey Tournament was the 26th edition of the WCHA Tournament. It was played between February 28 and March 8, 2025. The final two rounds were hosted by the University of Minnesota Duluth at AMSOIL Arena, after the first round was played at the home ice of the top four seeds.

Wisconsin entered the tournament as the defending champions. Wisconsin repeated as tournament champions and earned the conference's automatic bid to the 2025 NCAA Division I women's ice hockey tournament.

== Format ==
The tournament includes all eight teams in the conference. Teams were ranked according to their finish in the conference standings. All quarterfinal games are best two of three and are played at the highest seed's home sites, and starting with the semifinals, single-elimination played at AMSOIL Arena. The tournament champion will receive an automatic bid into the 2025 NCAA Division I women's ice hockey tournament.

== Standings ==
2024–25 Western Collegiate Hockey Association standings
	Conference										Overall					
	GP	W	L	T	OTW	OTL	SOW	PTS	GF	GA	GP	W	L	T	GF	GA
#1 Wisconsin†*	28	25	1	2	1	0	1	77	137	35	41	38	1	2	221	48
#2 Ohio State	28	19	6	3	3	0	2	59	95	58	40	29	8	3	155	83
#4 Minnesota	28	19	8	1	1	0	0	57	95	69	42	29	12	1	153	104
#6 Minnesota Duluth	28	14	12	2	0	2	2	48	76	53	39	22	15	2	114	70
#11 St. Cloud State	28	10	13	5	1	1	1	36	53	71	36	15	15	6	74	82
Minnesota State	28	7	19	2	0	4	1	28	70	97	37	14	21	2	105	118
St. Thomas	28	6	21	1	2	2	1	20	47	116	36	9	25	2	73	140
Bemidji State	28	4	24	0	1	0	0	11	34	108	37	6	30	1	56	148
Championship: March 8, 2025 † indicates conference regular season champion; * indicates conference tournament champion Rankings: USCHO.com; updated March 23, 2025

== Bracket ==
Quarterfinals; February 28 – March 2
8	Bemidji State	0	0	–
1	Wisconsin	3	11	–
5	St. Cloud State	2	1	–
4	Minnesota Duluth	3	2	–
7	St. Thomas	1	1	–
2	Ohio State	5	4	–
6	Minnesota State	1	5**	2
3	Minnesota	6	4	6

Semifinals; March 7
1	Wisconsin	3
4	Minnesota Duluth	1
2	Ohio State	2
3	Minnesota	6

Championship; March 8
1	Wisconsin	4
3	Minnesota	3

Note: * denotes overtime period(s)

== Results ==
=== Quarterfinals ===
==== (8) Bemidji State at (1) Wisconsin ====
February 28, 2025; 7:00 PM	Bemidji State	0–3 (0–1, 0–2, 0–0)	Wisconsin	LaBahn Arena, Madison, Wisconsin; Attendance: 2,273

Kaitlin Groess
Goalies
Ava McNaughton
Referees:
Jestina Vichorek
Robert Ludwig
Linesmen:
Brenda Reinen
Dan Kassis

0–1	19:21 – Gorbatenko (Scannell, Harvey)
0–2	35:22 – Enright (Bickett, Hall)
0–3	37:55 – Eden (Harvey, O'Brien)

4 min
Penalties
4 min
12
Shots
45

March 1, 2025; 3:00 PM	Bemidji State	0–11 (0–8, 0–1, 0–2)	Wisconsin	LaBahn Arena, Madison, Wisconsin; Attendance: 2,273

Kaitlin Groess
Goalies
Ava McNaughton
Referees:
Robert Ludwig
Jestina Vichorek
Linesmen:
Brenda Reinen
Dan Kassis

0–1	00:15 – Simms (O'Brien, Eden)
0–2	3:06 – Simms (O'Brien, Eden)
0–3	4:32 – Scannell (Murphy, Enright)
0–4	5:00 – McCarthy (O'Brien, Halverson)
0–5	5:45 – Gorbatenko (Hall, Kotlowski)
0–6	10:41 – Hall (Kotlowski)
0–7	12:05 – pp – O'Brien (Harvey)
0–8	18:46 – Halverson (O'Brien, Simms)
0–9	30:06 – Simms (O'Brien, Eden)
0–10	39:06 – Wozniewicz (Gorbatenko, Harvey)
0–11	59:59 – McCarthy (Venusio, Halverson)

4 min
Penalties
4 min
30
Shots
31

==== (7) St. Thomas at (2) Ohio State ====
February 28, 2025; 6:00 PM	St. Thomas	1–5 (0–2, 0–1, 1–2)	Ohio State	Ohio State University Ice Rink, Columbus, Ohio; Attendance: 555

Dani Strom
Goalies
Amanda Thiele
Referees:
Duncan Ryhorchuk
Shannon Motzko
Linesmen:
Tyler Iffland
Tim Katrinak

	0–1	1:31 – Dunne (Jungåker, Peschel)
	0–2	12:39 – Peschel (Amos, Dunne)
	0–3	24:46 – Jungåker (Webster, Baxter)
	0–4	40:29 – pp – Amos (Dunne, Jungåker)
Sajevic – pp – 57:04	1–4
	1–5	58:14 – sh – Jungåker (Webster)

8 min
Penalties
23 min
12
Shots
42

March 1, 2025; 3:00 PM	St. Thomas	1–4 (0–3, 0–1, 1–0)	Ohio State	Ohio State University Ice Rink, Columbus, Ohio; Attendance: 434

Dani Strom
Goalies
Amanda Thiele
Referees:
Duncan Ryhorchuk
Shannon Motzko
Linesmen:
Tyler Iffland
Tim Katrinak

	0–1	1:36 – pp – Dunne (Amos, Jungåker)
	0–2	1:48 – St. Martin (Petrie, Baxter)
	0–3	14:56 – Wheeler (Brengman, Matthews)
	0–4	39:27 – Webster (Dunne, Disher)
Jurgensen (Clough) – 57:04	1–4

4 min
Penalties
6 min
15
Shots
34

==== (6) Minnesota State at (3) Minnesota ====
February 28, 2025; 6:00	Minnesota State	1–6 (0–1, 0–2, 1–3)	Minnesota	Ridder Arena, Minneapolis, Minnesota; Attendance: 1,206

Hailey Hansen
Goalies
Hannah Clark
Referees:
Sarma Pone
Gui Bradshaw
Linesmen:
Doug Durgin
Sam Jerome

	0–1	9:08 – Lindsay (Hemp, Kreisz)
	0–2	21:40 – Kreisz (Lindsay, Hemp)
	0–3	37:43 – pp – Kreisz (Murphy, Primerano)
Vekich (Van Batavia) – 40:13	1–3
	1–4	54:57 – Huber (Primerano, Murphy)
	1–5	56:00 – Lindsay (Kreisz)
	1–6	59:15 – Hemp (Laitinen, Kreisz)

6 min
Penalties
2 min
24
Shots
45

March 1, 2025; 2:00	Minnesota State	5–4 (1–0, 2–2, 1–2); OT: (0–0, 1–0)	Minnesota	Ridder Arena, Minneapolis, Minnesota; Attendance: 1,280

Hailey Hansen
Goalies
Hannah Clark
Referees:
Sarma Pone
Gui Bradshaw
Linesmen:
Doug Durgin
Sam Jerome

Bourgerie (Je. Gazdik, Ju. Gazdik) – 8:48	1–0
Vekich (Nelson, Ju. Gazdik) – pp – 21:22	2–0
Langseth (Ju. Gazdik, Je. Gazdik) – 24:19	3–0
	3–1	25:02 – Murphy (Huber, Parkonnen)
	3–2	29:09 – Huber (Bouveng)
Paddington (Van Batavia, Ju. Gazdik) – 40:15	4–2
	4–3	42:05 – Murphy (Huber, Bouveng)
	4–4	44:21 – Parkkonen (Mlýnková, Wethington)
Mashuga (Langseth) – 99:55.3	5–4

4 min
Penalties
8 min
41
Shots
70

March 2, 2025; 3:00 PM	Minnesota State	2–6 (0–1, 1–5, 1–0)	Minnesota	Ridder Arena, Minneapolis, Minnesota; Attendance: 1,253

Hailey Hansen
Suzette Faucher
Goalies
Hannah Clark
Olivia King
Referees:
Sarma Pone
Gui Bradshaw
Linesmen:
Doug Durgin
Sam Jerome

	0–1	15:13 – pp – Mlýnková (Murphy, Primerano)
	0–2	21:35 – Lindsay (Laitinen, Hemp)
	0–3	25:29 – sh – Wethington (Hemp, Primerano)
	0–4	27:14 – Murphy (Primerano)
Nelson (Mashuga, Roeske) – 29:05	1–4
	1–5	30:35 – Murphy (Laitinen)
	1–6	38:06 – Hemp (Kreisz)
Nelson (Seifert, Ramirez) – 19:35.6	2–6

2 min
Penalties
6 min
28
Shots
29

==== (5) St. Cloud State at (4) Minnesota-Duluth ====
February 28, 2025; 2:00	St. Cloud State	2–3 (0–1, 2–0, 0–2)	Minnesota Duluth	AMSOIL Arena, Duluth, Minnesota; Attendance: 987

Sanni Ahola
Goalies
Ève Gascon
Referees:
Tyler Rew
Scott Roth
Linesmen:
Aaron Neville
Glendon Seal

	0–1	16:59 – pp – Kraemer (Wallin, Van Wieren)
Gentry (Ross, Zimmermann) – 29:56	1–1
Sauriol (Yrjölä, Ross) – pp – 34:07	2–1
	2–2	58:05 – Kraemer (Wallin, Van Wieren)
	2–3	59:55 – Wallin (Jobst-Smith, Van Wieren)

11 min
Penalties
8 min
34
Shots
31

March 1, 2025; 1:00	St. Cloud State	1–2 (0–0, 0–2, 1–0)	Minnesota Duluth	AMSOIL Arena, Duluth, Minnesota; Attendance: 803

Emilia Kyrkkö
Goalies
Ève Gascon
Referees:
Tyler Rew
Scott Roth
Linesmen:
Aaron Neville
Glendon Seal

	0–1	33:53 – Sadura (Kraemer)
	0–2	38:58 – Mobley (Jobst-Smith)
Zimmermann (Moran, Anick) – 55:33	1–2

2 min
Penalties
4 min
39
Shots
32

=== Semifinals ===
==== (4) Minnesota Duluth at (1) Wisconsin ====
March 7, 2025; 1:02	Minnesota Duluth	1–3 (1–1, 0–1, 0–1)	Wisconsin	AMSOIL Arena, Duluth, Minnesota; Attendance: 867

Ève Gascon
Goalies
Ava McNaughton
Referees:
Duncan Ryhorchuk
Jestina Vichorek
Linesmen:
Sam Jerome
Ron Laituri

Sadura (Lawry) - 2:56	1–0
	1–1	6:21 – Gorbatenko (Potter)
	1–2	35:11 – Harvey (O'Brien, Edwards)
	1–3	58:56 – Venusio (Harvey)

4 min
Penalties
2 min
23
Shots
42

==== (3) Minnesota at (2) Ohio State ====
March 7, 2025; 4:32	Minnesota	6–2 (2–2, 2–0, 2–0)	Ohio State	AMSOIL Arena, Duluth, Minnesota; Attendance: 1,762

Hannah Clark
Goalies
Amanda Thiele
Referees:
Scott Roth
Mike Kaehler
Linesmen:
Glendon Seal
Aaron Neville

	0–1	2:04 – Amos (Dunne, Peschel)
	0–2	9:23 – Dunne (Webster, Swiderski)
Murphy (Morrow, Kreisz) – pp – 14:05	1–2
Huber (Murphy, Primerano) – pp – 18:52	2–2
Audrey Wethington (Mlýnková, Conner) – 27:51	3–2
Lindsay (Hemp, Nicholson) – 31:47	4–2
Murphy (Huber, Bouveng) – 48:21	5–2
Primerano – en – 56:39	6–2

8 min
Penalties
10 min
21
Shots
24

=== Championship ===
March 8, 2025; 2:00	Minnesota	3–4 (2–1, 1–2, 0–1)	Wisconsin	AMSOIL Arena, Duluth, Minnesota; Attendance: 1,715

Hannah Clark
Goalies
Ava McNaughton
Referees:
Gui Bradshaw
Sarma Pone
Linesmen:
Brenda Reinen
Jamie Arola

	0–1	9:12 – O'Brien (Simms)
Franco (Wethington) – 9:32	1–1
Bouveng (Murphy, Primerano)	2–1
	2–2	20:42 – Jungels (O'Brien, Harvey)
Mlýnková (Huber) – pp – 39:07	3–2
	3–3	28:04 – Scannell (Venusio, Kotlowski)
	3–4	59:35 – Wozniewicz (O'Brien, Eden)

2 min
Penalties
6 min
34
Shots
34

== Tournament Awards ==
=== All-Tournament Team ===
- F: Casey O'Brien* (Wisconsin)
- F: Abbey Murphy (Minnesota)
- F: Sarah Wozniewicz (Wisconsin)
- D: Caroline Harvey (Wisconsin)
- D: Chloe Primerano (Minnesota)
- G: Ava McNaughton (Wisconsin)

* Most Outstanding Player
