= 2024–25 Women's Euro Hockey Tour =

International ice hockey tournament season

Tournament details
- Host countries: Switzerland; Sweden; Finland; Czechia
- Dates: 4-Nations in Kloten; 29–31 August 2024; Lidl Hockey Games; 6–9 November 2024; 6-Nations in Tampere; 11–15 December 2024; 3-Nations in Liberec; 6–8 February 2025
- Format: Round-robin
- Teams: 6

Final positions
- Champions: Finland
- Runners-up: Czech Republic
- Third place: Sweden
- Fourth place: Switzerland

Tournament statistics
- Games played: 26
- Goals scored: 124 (4.77 per game)
- Attendance: 14,952 (575 per game)
- Scoring leaders: 4-Nations in Kloten; (Finland) Viivi Vainikka (5); Lidl Hockey Games; (Finland) Ronja Savolainen (4); 6-Nations in Tampere; (United States) Abbey Murphy (9); 3-Nations in Liberec; (Czech Republic) Michaela Pejzlová (4)
- All statistics correct as of 8 February 2025.

The 2024–25 Women's Euro Hockey Tour was the first Women's Euro Hockey Tour (WEHT) season following the joint commitment of Czechia, Finland, Sweden, and Switzerland to host and participate in the tour through 2028. It was the fifth season since the revision and expansion of the tournament format in 2018.

The season comprised four tournaments, hosted in Switzerland, Sweden, Finland, and Czechia, respectively. The national teams of Czechia, Finland, and Switzerland participated in all four tournaments. Sweden participated in the first three tournaments but did not participate in the fourth due to a scheduling conflict with the Olympic qualification, which was held in Sweden at the same time. Canada and the United States participated in the December tournament in Finland.

== 4-Nations Tournament in Kloten ==
The 2024–25 season began in Switzerland with the 4-Nations Tournament in Kloten during 29 to 31 August 2024. The core WEHT national teams – Czechia, Finland, Switzerland, and Sweden – participated in the tournament. All six games were played at SWISS Arena (previously Stimo Arena) in Kloten, Canton of Zurich.

=== Standings ===
Pos	Team	Pld	W	OTW	OTL	L	GF	GA	GD	Pts
1	Czechia	3	2	0	1	0	10	7	+3	7
2	Sweden	3	2	0	0	1	14	12	+2	6
3	Finland	3	1	0	0	2	9	11	−2	3
4	Switzerland (H)	3	0	1	0	2	4	7	−3	2

Source: Swiss Ice Hockey Federation
(H) Host

=== Results ===
Games times are local (UTC+2).

29 August 2024; 15:30	Czechia	3–2 (0–0, 2–0, 1–2)	Finland	Swiss Arena, Kloten; Attendance: 84

Klára Peslarová
Goalies
Anni Keisala
Referees:
Anneke Orlandini
Karin Williner
Linesmen:
Anina Schüpbach-Egli
Michèle Müller

Vanišová (Přibylová) – 22:38	1–0
Křížová – 36:19	2–0
Mrázová – 53:17	3–0
	3–1	53:50 – Nieminen
	3–2	58:12 – Tulus (EA)

12 min
Penalties
10 min

Shots
17

29 August 2024; 19:00	Switzerland	1–4 (0–2, 0–1, 1–1)	Sweden	Swiss Arena, Kloten; Attendance: 104

Andrea Brändli
Goalies
Emma Söderberg
Referees:
Reica Staiger
Mariko Dale
Linesmen:
Jamie Monard
Tamara Perrin

	0–1	04:48 – T. Johansson (Hedqvist, Hallin)
	0–2	13:28 – Nylén-Persson (Bergström)
	0–3	24:02 – H. Svensson (Sundin)
Herzig (Baechler) (PP1) – 47:43	1–3
	1–4	57:05 – E. Svensson (Nylén-Persson, Ljungblom) (PP1)

10 min
Penalties
10 min

30 August 2024; 15:30	Finland	5–7 (2–1, 2–5, 1–1)	Sweden	Swiss Arena, Kloten; Attendance: 84

Kerttu Kuja-Halkola
Goalies
Ida Boman
Referees:
Karin Williner
Michaela Matejová
Linesmen:
Anina Schüpbach-Egli
Michèle Müller

	0–1	05:18 – Leijonhielm (Sundin)
Vainikka (Tulus) (PP1) – 14:52	1–1
Tulus (Nylund, Laitinen) (PP1) – 17:18	2–1
Vainikka (Hiirikoski) – 20:40	3–1
Tapani (Nieminen, Vainikka) – 22:42	4–1
	4–2	24:53 – I. Karlsson
	4–3	28:49 – Forsgren (Hedqvist)
	4–4	29:32 – Bouveng (Hedqvist)
	4–5	31:38 – Sundin (Hallin)
	4–6	38:12 – Hedqvist (Lidman)
	4–7	42:28 – Leijonhielm (Sundin)
Rantala (Vainikka) – 48:04	5–7

4 min
Penalties
6 min
22
Shots

30 August 2024; 19:00	Switzerland	2–1 GWS (0–1, 0–0, 1–0) (OT: 0–0) (SO: 1–0)	Czechia	Swiss Arena, Kloten; Attendance: 147

Saskia Maurer	Goalies	Michaela Hesová	Referees: Anneke Orlandini; Mariko Dale; Linesmen: Domenica Maurer; Jamie Monard
/ 0–1 / 12:21 – Pejzlová (Plosová); Stalder – 50:34 / 1–1			Referees: Anneke Orlandini; Mariko Dale; Linesmen: Domenica Maurer; Jamie Monard
Vallario (miss); Wey (miss); Stalder; Enzler (miss)	Shootout	(miss) Mlýnková; (miss) Pejzlová; (miss) Čajanová; (miss) Mrázová; (miss) Šapovalivová	Referees: Anneke Orlandini; Mariko Dale; Linesmen: Domenica Maurer; Jamie Monard
8 min	Penalties	14 min	Referees: Anneke Orlandini; Mariko Dale; Linesmen: Domenica Maurer; Jamie Monard

31 August 2024; 13:30	Czechia	6–3 (3–1, 1–2, 2–0)	Sweden	Swiss Arena, Kloten; Attendance: 74

Aneta Šenková
Goalies
Emma Söderberg
Referees:
Michaela Matejová
Mariko Dale
Linesmen:
Domenica Maurer
Jennifer Salzmann

Mlýnková (Trnková) – 00:50	1–0
Hymlárová (Pištěková, Plosová) – 1:00	2–0
Mlýnková (Šapovalivová, Pejzlová) – 10:52	3–0
	3–1	19:18 – Hjalmarsson (Ljungblom, E. Svensson)
	3–2	27:34 – Hjalmarsson (Nylén Persson, Raunio)
	3–3	28:35 – Ljungblom (E. Svensson)
Trnková – 31:17	4–3
Neubauerová (Juříčková) – 50:31	5–3
Křížová (Vanišová, Mrázová) (EN) – 56:31	6–3

4 min
Penalties
4 min

31 August 2024; 17:00	Switzerland	1–2 (1–0, 0–1, 0–1)	Finland	Swiss Arena, Kloten; Attendance: 361

Andrea Brändli
Goalies
Anni Keisala
Referees:
Reica Staiger
Anneke Orlandini
Linesmen:
Jamie Monard
Maria Hauhia

Enzler (Stalder, Leemann) (PP1) – 09:47	1–0
	1–1	39:52 – Tapani
	1–2	58:03 – Vainikka (Nieminen, Savolainen)

2 min
Penalties
2 min
17
Shots
30

Top scorers

	Player	GP	G	A	Pts	PIM	+/–
(Finland)	Viivi Vainikka	3	3	2	5	2	–2
(Sweden)	Ebba Hedqvist	3	1	3	4	4	–1
(Sweden)	Wilma Sundin	3	1	3	4	0	–3
(Finland)	Noora Tulus	3	2	1	3	0	–1
(Finland)	Petra Nieminen	3	2	1	3	0	–2
(Sweden)	Maja Nylén Persson	3	2	1	3	0	–4
(Sweden)	Elin Svensson	3	2	1	3	0	–4
(Sweden)	Lina Ljungblom	3	2	1	3	4	–4
(Finland)	Susanna Tapani	3	2	0	2	0	–2
(Sweden)	Sara Hjalmarsson	3	2	0	2	0	–3
(Czech Republic)	Denisa Křížová	3	2	0	2	2	±0
(Sweden)	Isabelle Leijonhielm	3	2	0	2	2	–1
(Czech Republic)	Natálie Mlýnková	3	2	0	2	2	–1

Source: Swiss Ice Hockey Federation

Goaltenders

	Player	GP	TOI	W	L	GA	SO	GAA
(Finland)	Anni Keisala	2	116:47	1	1	4	0	2.06
(Sweden)	Emma Söderberg	2	119:07	1	1	6	0	3.02
(Switzerland)	Andrea Brändli	2	118:34	0	2	6	1	3.04
(Czech Republic)	Klára Peslarová	1	60:00	1	0	2	0	2.00
(Czech Republic)	Aneta Šenková	1	60:00	1	0	3	0	3.00
(Sweden)	Ida Boman	1	60:00	1	0	5	0	5.00
(Czech Republic)	Michaela Hesová	1	65:00	0	0	1	0	0.92
(Switzerland)	Saskia Maurer	1	65:00	0	0	1	0	0.92
(Finland)	Kerttu Kuja-Halkola	1	56:02	0	1	7	0	7.50

Source: Swiss Ice Hockey Federation

== Lidl Hockey Games ==
The second event of the season was a four-nations tournament in Södertälje, Sweden during 6 to 9 November 2024. Officially called the Lidl Hockey Games, it was the first WEHT tournament with a title sponsor to be hosted in Sweden. The core WEHT national teams participated and all games were played at Scaniarinken.

Czechia secured three victories – two in regulation and one in overtime – to win the tournament. Finland placed second, with two wins and one loss, and Sweden placed third, with one win, one overtime loss, and one loss in regulation. Switzerland finished last with zero points after notching only one goal across their three losses.

With four assists in three games, Finnish defender Ronja Savolainen led the tournament in scoring. Teammate Susanna Tapani ranked second, with a goal and two assists. Czech centre Kateřina Mrázová and Finnish centre Sanni Vanhanen tied for third on the tournament scoring chart, with three assists each. In total, the tournament's top-ten scorers (Note: The tournament's list of top-ten scorers included three players tied for tenth place, resulting in a total of twelve players ranked within the top-ten.) featured six Finnish players, three Czech players, and three Swedish players, led by Lina Ljungblom (2+0). Rahel Enzler scored Switzerland's only goal of the tournament unassisted and was the only Swiss player to record a point.

Eighteen year old Barbora Dalecká of Czechia and Salla Sivula of Finland both recorded shutouts in their respective match played and topped the tournament goaltending table with perfect marks across 60 minutes in play (MIP). The Lidl Hockey Games served as the two goaltenders' senior national team debuts. Finland's Anni Keisala recorded the best statistics of goalies playing in more than one game, earning a 93.9 save percentage (S%) and 1.55 goals against average (GAA) in 116 minutes on ice, and was named Best Goaltender of the tournament. Andrea Brändli was Switzerland's top performing goaltender, with a 91.7 S% and 3.00 GAA in 60 MIP, and Emma Söderberg led Swedish netminders, with a 90.0 S% and 1.00 GAA in 60 MIP.

=== Standings ===
Pos	Team	Pld	W	OTW	OTL	L	GF	GA	GD	Pts
1	Czechia	3	2	1	0	0	7	2	+5	8
2	Finland	3	2	0	0	1	7	3	+4	6
3	Sweden (H)	3	1	0	1	1	4	6	−2	4
4	Switzerland	3	0	0	0	3	1	8	−7	0

Source: Svenska Ishockeyförbundet
(H) Host

=== Results ===
Games times are local (UTC+1).

6 November 2024; 14:00	Finland	3–0 (1–0, 2–0, 0–0)	Switzerland	Scaniarinken, Södertälje

Salla Sivula
Goalies
Andrea Brändli
Referees:
Ida Henriksson
Anna Hammar
Linesmen:
Wilma Westlund
Julia Hjelmström

Vainikka (Savolainen, Vanhanen) (PP1) – 09:19	1–0
Karvinen (Holopainen) – 38:31	2–0
Tapani (Savolainen) – 39:07	3–0

4 min
Penalties
4 min
36
Shots
11

6 November 2024; 18:00	Czechia	2–1 OT (0–0, 1–1, 0–0) (OT: 1–0)	Sweden	Scaniarinken, Södertälje; Attendance: 509

Klára Peslarová
Goalies
Ebba Svensson Träff
Referees:
Veronica Lovensnö
Zuzanna Svobodová
Linesmen:
Kristýna Hájková
Ottilia Classon

	0–1	29:05 – Forsgren
Radová (Neubauerová) – 33:03	1–1
Vanišová (Tejralová) – 61:16	2–1

0 min
Penalties
6 min
25
Shots
19

8 November 2024; 14:00	Finland	1–2 (0–0, 1–2, 0–0)	Czechia	Scaniarinken, Södertälje

Anni Keisala
Goalies
Viktorie Švejdová
Referees:
Ida Henriksson
Zuzanna Svobodová
Linesmen:
Ottilia Classon
Wilma Westlund

Holopainen (Tapani, Vainikka) – 29:37	1–0
	1–1	35:17 – Hymlárová (Mrázová)
	1–2	37:28 – Haasová (Pejzlová, Šapovalivová)

6 min
Penalties
6 min
18
Shots
19

8 November 2024; 18:00	Sweden	2–1 (0–1, 0–0, 2–0)	Switzerland	Scaniarinken, Södertälje; Attendance: 1,023

Emma Söderberg
Goalies
Talina Benderer
Referees:
Veronica Lovensnö
Anna Hammar
Linesmen:
Julia Hjelmström
Kristýna Hájková

	0–1	06:07 – Enzler
Ljungblom (Hallin, Lundin) – 46:32	1–1
Ljungblom (H. Olsson, Lundin) (PP2) – 54:23	2–1

2 min
Penalties
8 min
20
Shots
10

9 November 2024; 12:00	Switzerland	0–3 (0–0, 0–1, 0–2)	Czechia	Scaniarinken, Södertälje

Alexandra Lehmann
Goalies
Barbora Dalecká
Referees:
Veronica Lovensnö
Ida Henriksson
Linesmen:
Julia Hjelmström
Ottilia Classon

0–1	36:44 – Pejšová (Čajanová)
0–2	44:56 – Křížová (Mrázová)
0–3	52:14 – Vanišová (Mrázová, Tejralová)

4 min
Penalties
4 min
18
Shots
30

9 November 2024; 16:00	Sweden	1–3 (0–1, 0–1, 1–1)	Finland	Scaniarinken, Södertälje; Attendance: 2,974

Ebba Svensson Träff
Goalies
Anni Keisala
Referees:
Anna Hammar
Zuzanna Svobodová
Linesmen:
Kristýna Hájková
Wilma Westlund

	0–1	15:49 – Nylund (Savolainen, Vanhanen) (PP1)
	0–2	24:10 – Liikala (Savolainen, Nylund)
Thuvik (Hallin) – 49:07	1–2
	1–3	53:13 – Tulus (Vesa, Vanhanen)

6 min
Penalties
4 min
30
Shots
18

Top scorers

	Player	GP	G	A	Pts	PIM	+/–
(Finland)	Ronja Savolainen	3	0	4	4	0	±0
(Finland)	Susanna Tapani	3	1	2	3	4	+2
(Czech Republic)	Kateřina Mrázová	3	0	3	3	2	+3
(Finland)	Sanni Vanhanen	3	0	3	3	0	+1
(Czech Republic)	Tereza Vanišová	3	2	0	2	2	+4
(Sweden)	Lina Ljungblom	3	2	0	2	0	±0
(Finland)	Viivi Vainikka	2	1	1	2	0	+1
(Finland)	Elisa Holopainen	3	1	1	2	2	+2
(Finland)	Jenniina Nylund	3	1	1	2	4	±0
(Sweden)	Mira Hallin	3	0	2	2	0	+2
(Sweden)	Sofie Lundin	3	0	2	2	0	+1
(Czech Republic)	Aneta Tejralová	3	0	2	2	0	+2

Source: Suomen Jääkiekkoliitto

Goaltenders

	Player	GP	TOI	W	L	Svs	GA	SO	S%	GAA
(Czech Republic)	Barbora Dalecká	1	60:00	1	0	18	0	1	100	0.00
(Finland)	Salla Sivula	1	60:00	1	0	11	0	1	100	0.00
(Czech Republic)	Klára Peslarová	1	61:16	1	0	18	1	0	94.7	0.98
(Czech Republic)	Viktorie Švejdová	1	60:00	1	0	17	1	0	94.4	1.00
(Finland)	Anni Keisala	2	116:12	1	1	46	3	0	93.9	1.55
(Switzerland)	Andrea Brändli	1	60:00	0	1	33	3	0	91.7	3.00
(Switzerland)	Alexandra Lehmann	1	60:00	0	1	27	3	0	90.0	3.00
(Switzerland)	Talina Benderer	1	60:00	0	1	18	2	0	90.0	2.00
(Sweden)	Emma Söderberg	1	60:00	1	0	9	1	0	90.0	1.00
(Sweden)	Ebba Svensson Träff	2	121:16	0	2	38	5	0	88.4	2.47

Source: Suomen Jääkiekkoliitto

=== Player awards ===
- Best Goaltender: (Finland) Anni Keisala
- Best Forward: (Czech Republic) Tereza Vanišová

Players of the Game

- FIN v SUI: Michelle Karvinen (FIN), Lena Marie Lutz (SUI)
- CZE v SWE: unknown (CZE), Lina Ljungblom (SWE)
- FIN v CZE: Susanna Tapani (FIN), Tereza Vanišová (CZE)
- SWE v SUI: unknown (SWE), Rahel Enzler (SUI)
- SUI v CZE: Sinja Leemann (SUI), unknown (CZE)
- SWE v FIN: unknown (SWE), unknown (FIN)

== 6-Nations in Tampere ==
The third event of the season was a 6-Nations Tournament in Tampere, Finland during 11 to 15 December 2024. In addition to the four core WEHT teams, the Canada women's national development team and the United States collegiate women’s national select team participated. Games were played at Hakametsä, officially known as Tampereen jäähalli or Tampere Ice Stadium. Unlike the other 2024–25 WEHT tournaments, the six-nations in Tampere was played in two stages: a group stage followed by a placement round.

It was reported that the national programs involved had tacitly agreed to focus their roster selections on young players in senior national team pipelines. While such an agreement was not explicitly announced by any national team, the rosters of all six teams were dominated by players in the 18 to 24 age group, many of whom were actively playing or were committed to play college ice hockey at the time of the tournament.

=== Group A ===
==== Standings ====
Pos	Team	Pld	W	OTW	OTL	L	GF	GA	GD	Pts
1	United States	2	2	0	0	0	10	2	+8	6
2	Finland (H)	2	1	0	0	1	4	4	0	3
3	Switzerland	2	0	0	0	2	2	10	−8	0

Updated to match(es) played on 13 December 2024. Source: Suomen Jääkiekkoliitto
(H) Host

==== Results ====
Games times are local (UTC+2).

12 December 2024; 19:00	Finland	0–4 (0–0, 0–0, 0–4)	United States	Hakametsä, Tampere; Attendance: 1,110

Sanni Ahola
Goalies
Ava McNaughton
Referees:
Anniina Nurmi
Tiina Saarimäki
Linesmen:
Salla-Maaria Raitala
Eleonoora Mikkonen

0–1	44:31 – Murphy (Edwards)
0–2	51:43 – Jo. Dunne
0–3	53:04 – Murphy (Winn)
0–4	56:47 – Huber (Murphy) (EN)

4 min
Penalties
6 min
14
Shots
33

Players of the Game: Elli Suoranta (FIN), Abbey Murphy (USA)

12 December 2024; 15:00	United States	6–2 (1–1, 3–0, 2–1)	Switzerland	Hakametsä, Tampere; Attendance: 131

Amanda Thiele
Goalies
Andrea Brändli
Referees:
Reetta-Kaisa Lusi
Linnea Marin
Linesmen:
Ilona Silander
Eleonoora Mikkonen

Janecke (Murphy) – 06:10	1–0
	1–1	12:08 – Vallario (Marti)
Matthews (Eden) – 28:58	2–1
Huber (Jo. Dunne) – 30:27	3–1
Murphy (Simms) (PP1) – 35:39	4–1
Hall (Zanon) – 40:51	5–1
O'Brien (Peschel) – 44:55	6–1
	6–2	51:18 – Lutz (Leemann, Baechler) (PP1)

6 min
Penalties
4 min
55
Shots
12

Players of the Game: Kiara Zanon (USA), Nicole Vallario (SUI)

13 December 2024; 19:00	Switzerland	0–4 (0–0, 0–3, 0–1)	Finland	Hakametsä, Tampere; Attendance: 572

Saskia Maurer
Goalies
Emilia Kyrkkö
Referees:
Reica Steiger
Reetta-Kaisa Lusi
Linesmen:
Kamila Smetková
Salla-Maaria Raitala

0–1	28:40 – Havana (Rantala)
0–2	35:08 – Vainikka (Holopainen, Rantala)
0–3	37:08 – Vesa (Rantala, Holopainen) (PP1)
0–4	44:19 – Sundelin (Tallinen)

8 min
Penalties
6 min
40
Shots
10

Players of the Game: Shannon Sigrist (SUI), Sanni Rantala (FIN)

=== Group B ===
==== Standings ====
Pos	Team	Pld	W	OTW	OTL	L	GF	GA	GD	Pts
1	Canada	2	2	0	0	0	5	1	+4	6
2	Sweden	2	1	0	0	1	4	2	+2	3
3	Czechia	2	0	0	0	2	0	6	−6	0

Source: Suomen Jääkiekkoliitto

==== Results ====
Games times are local (UTC+2).

11 December 2024; 15:00	Sweden	1–2 (0–1, 1–1, 0–0)	Canada	Hakametsä, Tampere; Attendance: 213

Ida Boman
Goalies
Ève Gascon
Referees:
Linnea Marin
Kaisa Ketonen
Linesmen:
Helinä Anttila
Ilona Silander

	0–1	05:54 – Amos (Venusio, Cooper) (PP1)
	0–2	29:25 – Gosling (Pais, Amos)
T. Johansson (Hedqvist) – 29:55	1–2

8 min
Penalties
6 min
17
Shots
21

12 December 2024; 19:00	Canada	3–0 (1–0, 2–0, 0–0)	Czechia	Hakametsä, Tampere; Attendance: 119

Hannah Murphy
Goalies
Viktorie Švejdová
Referees:
Kaisa Ketonen
Henna Åberg
Linesmen:
Johanna Oksanen
Helinä Anttila

Cherkowski (Swiderski, Amos) – 10:16	1–0
Paul (Kraemer, Gosling) (PP1) – 24:01	2–0
Labad (Buglioni, Palumbo) – 29:07	3–0

14 min
Penalties
33 min
43
Shots
17

Players of the Game: Sarah Paul (CAN), Tereza Radová (CZE)

13 December 2024; 15:00	Czechia	0–3 (0–0, 0–1, 0–2)	Sweden	Hakametsä, Tampere; Attendance: 109

Michaela Hesová
Goalies
Emma Söderberg
Referees:
Ida Henriksson
Tiina Saarimäki
Linesmen:
Jessica Lundgren
Johanna Oksanen

0–1	22:05 – Hjalmarsson (Thuvik)
0–2	49:07 – E. Svensson (Blom, Hedqvist) (PP1)
0–3	58:45 – E. Svensson (Lundin)

14 min
Penalties
4 min
12
Shots
23

Players of the Game: Tereza Plosová (CZE), Sara Hjalmarsson (SWE)

=== Placement ===
==== Fifth place ====
14 December 2024; 11:30	Czechia	2–0 (1–0, 0–0, 1–0)	Switzerland	Hakametsä, Tampere; Attendance: 52

Viktorie Švejdová	Goalies	Andrea Brändli	Referees: Reica Steiger; Linnea Martin; Linesmen: Jessica Lundgren; Ilona Silander
Kaltounková (Radová) (SH) – 13:42 / 1–0; Pištěková (Kosinová, Plosová) – 52:22 / 2–0			Referees: Reica Steiger; Linnea Martin; Linesmen: Jessica Lundgren; Ilona Silander
29 min	Penalties	8 min	Referees: Reica Steiger; Linnea Martin; Linesmen: Jessica Lundgren; Ilona Silander
31	Shots	14	Referees: Reica Steiger; Linnea Martin; Linesmen: Jessica Lundgren; Ilona Silander

Players of the Game: Tereza Pištěková (CZE), Sinja Leemann (SUI)

15 December 2024; 11:30	Switzerland	0–3 (0–1, 0–0, 0–2)	Czechia	Hakametsä, Tampere; Attendance: 35

Saskia Maurer
Goalies
Aneta Šenková
Michaela Hesová
Referees:
Ida Henriksson
Reetta-Kaisa Lusi
Linesmen:
Jessica Lundgren
Johanna Oksanen

0–1	15:50 – Šapovalivová
0–2	53:50 – Pejzlová (Pištěková)
0–3	58:19 – Šapovalivová (Plosová, Kaltounková)

10 min
Penalties
4 min
17
Shots
38

Players of the Game: Lena Marie Lutz (SUI), Michaela Pejzlová (CZE)

==== Semifinals ====
14 December 2024; 15:00	United States	5–0 (1–0, 4–0, 0–0)	Sweden	Hakametsä, Tampere; Attendance: 107

Amanda Thiele
Goalies
Ida Boman
Ebba Svensson Träff
Referees:
Ida Henriksson
Reetta-Kaisa Lusi
Linesmen:
Kamila Smetková
Johanna Oksanen

Zanon (Eden, Edwards) (PP1) – 08:25	1–0
Huber (Harvey) – 23:00	2–0
Ab. Murphy (O'Brien, Simms) (PP1) – 30:53	3–0
Zanon (Edwards, Harvey) (PP1) – 35:13	4–0
Simms (Ab. Murphy) (PP1) – 35:29	5–0

6 min
Penalties
10 min
37
Shots
16

Players of the Game: Amanda Thiele (USA), Ida Karlsson (SWE)

14 December 2024; 19:00	Canada	3–0 (1–0, 1–0, 1–0)	Finland	Hakametsä, Tampere; Attendance: 601

Ève Gascon
Goalies
Sanni Ahola
Referees:
Tiina Saarimäki
Anniina Nurmi
Linesmen:
Salla-Maaria Raitala
Helinä Anttila

Law (Venusio) – 08:38	1–0
Paul (Kraemer, Av. Murphy) (PP1) – 34:18	2–0
Amos (EN) – 58:04	3–0

4 min
Penalties
8 min
34
Shots
21

Players of the Game: Ève Gascon (CAN), Petra Nieminen (FIN)

==== Third place game ====
15 December 2024; 15:00	Sweden	2–1 (0–0, 1–0, 1–1)	Finland	Hakametsä, Tampere; Attendance: 302

Emma Söderberg
Goalies
Emilia Kyrkkö
Referees:
Reica Staiger
Linnea Marin
Linesmen:
Kamila Smetková
Salla-Maaria Raitala

L. Johansson (Blom, Hjalmarsson) – 31:45	1–0
Thuvik (Lundin, H. Svensson) – 51:55	2–0
	2–1	52:25 – Vanhanen (SH)

8 min
Penalties
6 min
21
Shots
29

Players of the Game: Emma Söderberg (SWE), Elisa Holopainen (FIN)

==== First place game ====
15 December 2024; 19:00	United States	5–3 (0–1, 3–0, 2–2)	Canada	Hakametsä, Tampere; Attendance: 215

Ava McNaughton
Goalies
Ève Gascon
Referees:
Anniina Nurmi
Kaisa Ketonen
Linesmen:
Tiina Saarimäki
Helinä Anttila

	0–1	17:56 – Cherkowski (PS)
Eden (Edwards) – 24:21	1–1
Janecke (Zanon, Harvey) – 26:09	2–1
Morrow (Ab. Murphy) – 28:49	3–1
	3–2	50:40 – Amos (Pais)
	3–3	54:06 – Law
Ab. Murphy (Morrow, Harvey) – 55:26	4–3
Matthews (Hall) (EN) – 58:02	5–3

4 min
Penalties
8 min
38
Shots
23

Players of the Game: Abbey Murphy (USA), Ashley Messier (CAN)

=== Statistics ===
Top scorers

The cumulative top scorers of the tournament, i.e. most points in the group stage and placement round combined.

	Player	GP	G	A	Pts	PIM
(United States)	Abbey Murphy	4	5	4	9	0
(Canada)	Jocelyn Amos	4	3	2	5	0
(United States)	Kiara Zanon	4	2	2	4	0
(United States)	Laila Edwards	4	0	4	4	2
(United States)	Caroline Harvey	4	0	4	4	4
(United States)	Ella Huber	4	3	0	3	4
(United States)	Lacey Eden	4	1	2	3	0
(United States)	Kirsten Simms	4	1	2	3	2
(Finland)	Sanni Rantala	4	0	3	3	0
(Canada)	Anne Cherkowski	4	2	0	2	2
(United States)	Tessa Janecke	4	2	0	2	0
(Canada)	Alex Law	4	2	0	2	2
(United States)	Sloane Matthews	4	2	0	2	0
(Canada)	Sarah Paul	4	2	0	2	0
(Sweden)	Elin Svensson	4	2	0	2	0
(Czech Republic)	Adéla Šapovalivová	4	2	0	2	0

== 3-Nations in Liberec ==
The final event of the season was a 3-Nations Tournament in Liberec, Czechia during 6 to 8 February 2025. The national teams of Czechia, Finland, and Switzerland participated. Sweden did not participate in the tournament due to a scheduling conflict with the Olympic qualification, which was being held in Sweden at the same time. All games were played at Home Credit Arena.

=== Standings ===
Pos	Team	Pld	W	OTW	OTL	L	GF	GA	GD	Pts
1	Czechia (H)	2	2	0	0	0	11	4	+7	6
2	Finland	2	1	0	0	1	5	8	−3	3
3	Switzerland	2	0	0	0	2	3	7	−4	0

Updated to match(es) played on 8 February 2025. Source: Suomen Jääkiekkoliitto
(H) Host

=== Results ===
Games times are local (UTC+1).

6 February 2025; 18:30	Finland	3–1 (1–0, 2–0, 0–1)	Switzerland	Home Credit Arena, Liberec; Attendance: 343

Anni Keisala
Goalies
Talina Benderer

Liikala (Ekoluoma, Eronen) – 15:38	1–0
Holopainen (Savolainen, Karvinen) (PP) – 22:17	2–0
Liikala (Salonen, Ekoluoma) – 27:27	3–0
	3–1	59:12 – Lutz (Herzig, Stalder) (EA)

8 min
Penalties
6 min
17
Shots
36

7 February 2025; 18:30	Czechia	7–2 (2–0, 2–2, 3–0)	Finland	Home Credit Arena, Liberec; Attendance: 2,685

Klára Peslarová
Goalies
Anni Keisala

Šapovalivová (Kaltounková, Mrázová) – 00:32	1–0
Plosová (Přibylová, Juříčková) – 15:36	2–0
	2–1	24:08 – Rantala (Vainikka, Nieminen)
Plosová (Seroiszková, Juříčková) – 30:09	3–1
Hymlárová (Pejzlová, Vanišová) (PP1) – 33:37	4–1
	4–2	38:15 – Vainikka (Holopainen, Tulus)
Juříčková (Plosová, Vaníčková) – 42:35	5–2
Vanišová (Pejzlová) (PP1) – 50:08	6–2
Neubauerová (Pištěková, Pejzlová) – 52:25	7–2

4 min
Penalties
6 min
34
Shots
28

Players of the Game: Tereza Plosová (CZE), Viivi Vainikka (FIN)

8 February 2025; 18:30	Switzerland	2–4 (0–0, 1–1, 1–3)	Czechia	Home Credit Arena, Liberec; Attendance: 2,998

Saskia Maurer
Goalies
Klára Peslarová

Müller (Christen, Meriguet) – 26:15	1–0
	1–1	28:44 – Neubauerová (Pejzlová, Pištěková)
	1–2	44:26 – Vanišová (Křížová)
	1–3	49:18 – Mrázová (Šapovalivová, Kaltounková)
	1–4	51:12 – Neubauerová
Gaberell (Ryhner, Herzig) – 59:13	2–4

0 min
Penalties
6 min
35
Shots
21
