= 2024–25 WCHA women's ice hockey season =

2024–25 WCHA women's season
- Season: 2024–25
- Conference: WCHA
- Division: Division I
- Sport: women's ice hockey
- Duration: September 20, 2024– February 22, 2025
- Number of teams: 8

Regular Season
- Season champions: Wisconsin

WCHA Tournament
- Tournament champions: Wisconsin
- Runners-up: Minnesota

NCAA Tournament

The 2024–25 WCHA women's ice hockey season is the 26th season of the Western Collegiate Hockey Association and is taking place during the 2024–25 NCAA Division I women's ice hockey season. The regular season began on September 20, 2024, and ended on February 22, 2025.

== Standings ==
2024–25 Western Collegiate Hockey Association standings
| | Conference | | | | | | | | | | Overall | | | | | |
| | GP | W | L | T | OTW | OTL | SOW | PTS | GF | GA | GP | W | L | T | GF | GA |
|---|---|---|---|---|---|---|---|---|---|---|---|---|---|---|---|---|
| #1 Wisconsin†* | 28 | 25 | 1 | 2 | 1 | 0 | 1 | 77 | 137 | 35 | 41 | 38 | 1 | 2 | 221 | 48 |
| #2 Ohio State | 28 | 19 | 6 | 3 | 3 | 0 | 2 | 59 | 95 | 58 | 40 | 29 | 8 | 3 | 155 | 83 |
| #4 Minnesota | 28 | 19 | 8 | 1 | 1 | 0 | 0 | 57 | 95 | 69 | 42 | 29 | 12 | 1 | 153 | 104 |
| #6 Minnesota Duluth | 28 | 14 | 12 | 2 | 0 | 2 | 2 | 48 | 76 | 53 | 39 | 22 | 15 | 2 | 114 | 70 |
| #11 St. Cloud State | 28 | 10 | 13 | 5 | 1 | 1 | 1 | 36 | 53 | 71 | 36 | 15 | 15 | 6 | 74 | 82 |
| Minnesota State | 28 | 7 | 19 | 2 | 0 | 4 | 1 | 28 | 70 | 97 | 37 | 14 | 21 | 2 | 105 | 118 |
| St. Thomas | 28 | 6 | 21 | 1 | 2 | 2 | 1 | 20 | 47 | 116 | 36 | 9 | 25 | 2 | 73 | 140 |
| Bemidji State | 28 | 4 | 24 | 0 | 1 | 0 | 0 | 11 | 34 | 108 | 37 | 6 | 30 | 1 | 56 | 148 |
Championship: March 8, 2025 † indicates conference regular season champion; * indicates conference tournament champion Rankings: USCHO.com; updated March 23, 2025

== Conference tournament ==
Quarterfinals; February 28 – March 2
8 | Bemidji State | 0 | 0 | –
1 | Wisconsin | 3 | 11 | –
5 | St. Cloud State | 2 | 1 | –
4 | Minnesota Duluth | 3 | 2 | –
7 | St. Thomas | 1 | 1 | –
2 | Ohio State | 5 | 4 | –
6 | Minnesota State | 1 | 5** | 2
3 | Minnesota | 6 | 4 | 6

Semifinals; March 7
1 | Wisconsin | 3
4 | Minnesota Duluth | 1
2 | Ohio State | 2
3 | Minnesota | 6

Championship; March 8
1 | Wisconsin | 4
3 | Minnesota | 3

Note: * denotes overtime period(s)

== Awards ==
=== Players of the Month ===
As of March 5, 2025.

| Date | Forward of the Month | Defender of the Month | Goaltender of the Month | Rookie of the Month |
|---|---|---|---|---|
| September 2024 | Casey O'Brien (Wisconsin) | Emma Peschel (Ohio State) | Ève Gascon (Minnesota Duluth) | Caitlin Kraemer (Minnesota Duluth) |
| October 2024 | Casey O'Brien (Wisconsin) | Caroline Harvey (Wisconsin) | Ava McNaughton (Wisconsin) | Emilia Kyrkkö (St. Cloud State) |
| November 2024 | Laila Edwards (Wisconsin) | Caroline Harvey (Wisconsin) | Ava McNaughton (Wisconsin) | Caitlin Kraemer (Minnesota Duluth) |
| December 2024 | Abbey Murphy (Minnesota) | Chloe Primerano (Minnesota) | Ève Gascon (Minnesota Duluth) | Morgan Smith (Bemidji State) |
| January 2025 | Abbey Murphy (Minnesota) | Sydney Morrow (Minnesota) | Ava McNaughton (Wisconsin) | Dani Strom (St. Thomas) |
| February 2025 | Olivia Wallin (Minnesota Duluth) | Caroline Harvey (Wisconsin) | Ava McNaughton (Wisconsin) | Caitlin Kraemer (Minnesota Duluth) |

=== Players of the Week ===
As of February 25, 2025.

| Date | Forward of the Week | Defender of the Week | Goaltender of the Week | Rookie of the Week |
|---|---|---|---|---|
| September 23, 2024 | Emma Gentry (St. Cloud State) | Elia Anick (St. Cloud State) | Ève Gascon (Minnesota Duluth) | Caitlin Kraemer (Minnesota Duluth) |
| September 30, 2024 | Casey O'Brien (Wisconsin) | Caroline Harvey (Wisconsin) | Hailey MacLeod (Ohio State) | Jordyn Petrie (Ohio State) |
| October 7, 2024 | Casey O'Brien (Wisconsin) | Caroline Harvey (Wisconsin) | Emilia Kyrkkö (St. Cloud State) | Chloe Boreen (St. Thomas) |
| October 14, 2024 | Laila Edwards (Wisconsin) | Laney Potter (Wisconsin) | Amanda Thiele (Ohio State) | Maggie Scannell (Wisconsin) |
| October 21, 2024 | Hailey Armstrong (Bemidji State) | Caroline Harvey (Wisconsin) | Ava McNaughton (Wisconsin) | Emilia Kyrkkö (St. Cloud State) |
| October 28, 2024 | Joy Dunne (Ohio State) | Emma Peschel (Ohio State) | Emilia Kyrkkö (St. Cloud State) | Josie St. Martin (Ohio State) |
| November 4, 2024 | Joy Dunne (Ohio State) | Caroline Harvey (Wisconsin) | Dani Strom (St. Thomas) | Caitlin Kraemer (Minnesota Duluth) |
| November 11, 2024 | Cara Sajevic (St. Thomas) | Nicole Vallario (St. Thomas) | – | – |
| November 18, 2024 | Abbey Murphy (Minnesota) | Riley Brengman (Ohio State) | Hannah Clark (Minnesota) | Kaitlin Groess (Bemidji State) |
| November 25, 2024 | Olivia Wallin (Minnesota Duluth) | Tova Henderson (Minnesota Duluth) | Hailey Hansen (Minnesota State) | Chloe Boreen (St. Thomas) |
| December 2, 2024 | Kirsten Simms (Wisconsin) | Caroline Harvey (Wisconsin) | Hailey Hansen (Minnesota State) | Caitlin Kraemer (Minnesota Duluth) |
| December 9, 2024 | Abbey Murphy (Minnesota) | Chloe Primerano (Minnesota) | Ève Gascon (Minnesota Duluth) | Maggie Scannell (Wisconsin) |
| December 16, 2024 | Madison Mashuga (Minnesota State) | JuliAnne Gazdik (Minnesota State) | Hailey Hansen (Minnesota State) | Morgan Smith (Bemidji State) |
| January 6, 2025 | Whitney Tuttle (Minnesota State) | Sydney Morrow (Minnesota) | Ava McNaughton (Wisconsin) | Morgan Smith (Bemidji State) |
| January 13, 2025 | Jocelyn Amos (Ohio State) | Gracie Graham (Minnesota) | Ève Gascon (Minnesota Duluth) | Maggie Scannell (Wisconsin) |
| January 20, 2025 | Laila Edwards (Wisconsin) | Ava Murphy (Wisconsin) | Amanda Thiele (Ohio State) | Chloe Primerano (Minnesota) |
| January 27, 2025 | Lauren Stenslie (St. Thomas) | Mira Jungåker (Ohio State) | Hailey MacLeod (Ohio State) | Dani Strom (St. Thomas) |
| February 3, 2025 | Sofianna Sundelin (St. Cloud State) | Makenna Deering (Bemidji State) | Ava McNaughton (Wisconsin) | Dani Strom (St. Thomas) |
| February 10, 2025 | Casey O'Brien (Wisconsin) | Vivian Jungels (Wisconsin) | Ava McNaughton (Wisconsin) | Caitlin Kraemer (Minnesota Duluth) |
| February 17, 2025 | Clara Van Wieren (Minnesota Duluth) | Tova Henderson (Minnesota Duluth) | Eva Filippova (Bemidji State) | Morgan Smith (Bemidji State) |
| February 24, 2025 | Kirsten Simms (Wisconsin) | Caroline Harvey (Wisconsin) | Hannah Clark (Minnesota) | Mira Jungåker (Ohio State) |

=== All-WCHA Teams ===
| WCHA Team | Position | Player | Team |
|---|---|---|---|
| First Team | F | Laila Edwards | Wisconsin |
| First Team | F | Casey O'Brien | Wisconsin |
| First Team | F | Kirsten Simms | Wisconsin |
| First Team | D | Emma Peschel | Ohio State |
| First Team | D | Caroline Harvey | Wisconsin |
| First Team | G | Ève Gascon | Minnesota Duluth |
| Second Team | F | Abbey Murphy | Minnesota |
| Second Team | F | Joy Dunne | Ohio State |
| Second Team | F | Lacey Eden | Wisconsin |
| Second Team | D | Sydney Morrow | Minnesota |
| Second Team | D | Tova Henderson | Minnesota Duluth |
| Second Team | D | Nina Jobst-Smith | Minnesota Duluth |
| Second Team | G | Ava McNaughton | Wisconsin |
| Third Team | F | Olivia Mobley | Minnesota Duluth |
| Third Team | F | Clara Van Wieren | Minnesota Duluth |
| Third Team | F | Jocelyn Amos | Ohio State |
| Third Team | D | Chloe Primerano | Minnesota |
| Third Team | D | Laney Potter | Wisconsin |
| Third Team | G | Sanni Ahola | St. Cloud State |
| All-Rookie Team | F | Caitlin Kraemer | Minnesota Duluth |
| All-Rookie Team | F | Jordyn Petrie | Ohio State |
| All-Rookie Team | F | Maggie Scannell | Wisconsin |
| All-Rookie Team | D | Chloe Primerano | Minnesota |
| All-Rookie Team | D | Gracie Graham | Minnesota |
| All-Rookie Team | G | Emilia Kyrkkö | St. Cloud State |

==== Notes ====
Three defenders were elected to the Second Team due to ties in voting.
