= 2023–24 WCHA women's ice hockey season =

2023–24 WCHA women's season
- Season: 2023–24
- Conference: WCHA
- Division: Division I
- Sport: women's ice hockey
- Duration: September 23, 2023– February 25, 2024
- Number of teams: 8

Regular Season
- Season champions: Ohio State

WCHA Tournament
- Tournament champions: Wisconsin
- Runners-up: Ohio State

NCAA Tournament
- Best Finish: Champions

The 2023–24 WCHA women's ice hockey season is the 25th season of the Western Collegiate Hockey Association and is taking place during the 2023–24 NCAA Division I women's ice hockey season. The regular season began on September 23, 2023, and will end on February 25, 2024.

== Standings ==
2023–24 Western Collegiate Hockey Association standings
	Conference										Overall					
	GP	W	L	T	OTW	OTL	SOW	PTS	GF	GA	GP	W	L	T	GF	GA
#1 Ohio State †	28	26	2	0	2	0	0	78	140	37	39	35	4	0	201	51
#2 Wisconsin *	28	23	5	0	2	1	0	69	124	43	41	35	6	0	205	62
#5 Minnesota	28	19	7	1	1	2	2	62	92	60	39	27	10	2	135	80
#7 Minnesota Duluth	28	15	11	2	0	0	0	47	64	47	39	21	14	4	89	66
#10 St. Cloud State	28	12	14	2	0	1	0	40	60	59	34	17	17	2	78	69
Minnesota State	28	6	22	0	1	2	0	19	52	94	38	13	25	0	97	120
St. Thomas	28	4	23	1	0	0	1	11	39	120	37	10	26	1	74	150
Bemidji State	28	3	24	1	0	0	0	10	33	144	36	4	30	2	42	181
Championship: March 9, 2024 † indicates conference regular season champion; * indicates conference tournament champion Rankings: USCHO.com; updated March 24, 2023

== Awards ==
=== Players of the Year ===
As of March 6, 2024.

Date	Forward of the Year	Defender of the Year	Goaltender of the Year	Rookie of the Year
2023–24	Kirsten Simms (Wisconsin)	Caroline Harvey (Wisconsin)	Sanni Ahola (St. Cloud State)	Joy Dunne (Ohio State)

=== Players of the Month ===
As of February 27, 2024.

Date	Forward of the Month	Defender of the Month	Goaltender of the Month	Rookie of the Month
September 2023	Lacey Eden (Wisconsin)	Caroline Harvey (Wisconsin)	Raygan Kirk (Ohio State)	Cassie Hall (Wisconsin)
October 2023	Britta Curl (Wisconsin)	Emma Peschel (Ohio State)	Sanni Ahola (St. Cloud State)	Ava McNaughton (Wisconsin)
November 2023	Abbey Murphy (Minnesota)	Hadley Hartmetz (Ohio State)	Hailey MacLeod (Minnesota Duluth)	Joy Dunne (Ohio State)
December 2023	Abbey Murphy (Minnesota)	Caroline Harvey (Wisconsin)	Sanni Ahola (St. Cloud State)	Ava Lindsay (Minnesota)
January 2024	Casey O'Brien (Wisconsin)	Hadley Hartmetz (Ohio State)	Raygan Kirk (Ohio State)	Cassie Hall (Wisconsin)
February 2024	Jenna Buglioni (Ohio State)	Lauren Bernard (Ohio State)	Hailey MacLeod (Minnesota Duluth)	Ava McNaughton (Wisconsin)

=== Players of the Week ===
As of March 3, 2024.

Month	Forward of the Week	Defender of the Week	Goaltender of the Week	Rookie of the Week
September 26, 2023	Emma Gentry (St. Cloud State)	Elia Anick (St. Cloud State)	Sanni Ahola (St. Cloud State)	Sofianna Sundelin (St. Cloud State)
October 2, 2023	Lacey Eden (Wisconsin)	Caroline Harvey (Wisconsin)	Raygan Kirk (Ohio State)	Cassie Hall (Wisconsin)
October 9, 2023	Jamie Nelson (Minnesota State)	Jayden Seifert (Minnesota State)	Sanni Ahola (St. Cloud State)	Ella Boerger (St. Thomas)
October 19, 2023	Abbey Murphy (Minnesota)	Hadley Hartmetz (Ohio State)	Raygan Kirk (Ohio State)	Alice Sauriol (St. Cloud State)
October 23, 2023	Klára Hymlárová (St. Cloud State)	Anna Wilgren (Wisconsin)	Abbie Thompson (Bemidji State)	Ève Gascon (Minnesota Duluth)
October 30, 2023	Jennifer Gardiner (Ohio State)	Nelli Laitinen (Minnesota)	Jojo Chobak (St. Cloud State)	Jocelyn Amos (Ohio State)
November 6, 2023	Reece Hunt (Minnesota Duluth)	Emma Peschel (Ohio State)	Ève Gascon (Minnesota Duluth)	Joy Dunne (Ohio State)
November 13, 2023	Rylee Bartz (St. Thomas)	Nicole Vallario (St. Thomas)	Calla Frank (St. Thomas)	Ella Boerger (St. Thomas)
November 20, 2023	Jennifer Gardiner (Ohio State)	Khloe Lund (Bemidji State)	Raygan Kirk (Ohio State)	Hailey Armstrong (Bemidji State)
November 27, 2023	Abbey Murphy (Minnesota)	Hadley Hartmetz (Ohio State)	Hailey MacLeod (Minnesota Duluth)	Jocelyn Amos (Ohio State)
December 4, 2023	Abbey Murphy (Minnesota)	Ida Karlsson (Minnesota Duluth)	Sanni Ahola (St. Cloud State)	Ava Lindsay (Minnesota)
December 13, 2023	Kirsten Simms (Wisconsin)	Cayla Barnes (Ohio State)	Eva Filippova (Bemidji State)	Ella Boerger (St. Thomas)
January 10, 2024	Britta Curl (Wisconsin)	Charlotte Akervik (Minnesota State)	Skylar Vetter (Minnesota)	Cassie Hall (Wisconsin)
January 15, 2024	Casey O'Brien (Wisconsin)	Hanna Baskin (Minnesota Duluth)	Raygan Kirk (Ohio State)	Joy Dunne (Ohio State)
January 22, 2024	Casey O'Brien (Wisconsin)	Khloe Lund (Bemidji State)	Amanda Thiele (Ohio State)	Cassie Hall (Wisconsin)
January 29, 2024	Lacey Eden (Wisconsin)	Makenna Deering (Bemidji State)	Jane Gervais (Wisconsin)	Eva Filippova (Bemidji State)
February 5, 2024	Hannah Bilka (Ohio State)	Caroline Harvey (Wisconsin)	Jojo Chobak (St. Cloud State)	Jocelyn Amos (Ohio State)
February 17, 2024	Reece Hunt (Minnesota Duluth)	Caroline Harvey (Wisconsin)	Skylar Vetter (Minnesota)	Ève Gascon (Minnesota Duluth)
February 19, 2024	Taylor Otremba (Minnesota State)	Lauren Bernard (Ohio State)	Hailey MacLeod (Minnesota Duluth)	Ève Gascon (Minnesota Duluth)
March 2, 2024	Emma Gentry (St. Cloud State)	Taylor Larson (St. Cloud State)	Raygan Kirk (Ohio State)	Rylee Bartz (St. Thomas)
