= List of Boston Fleet players =

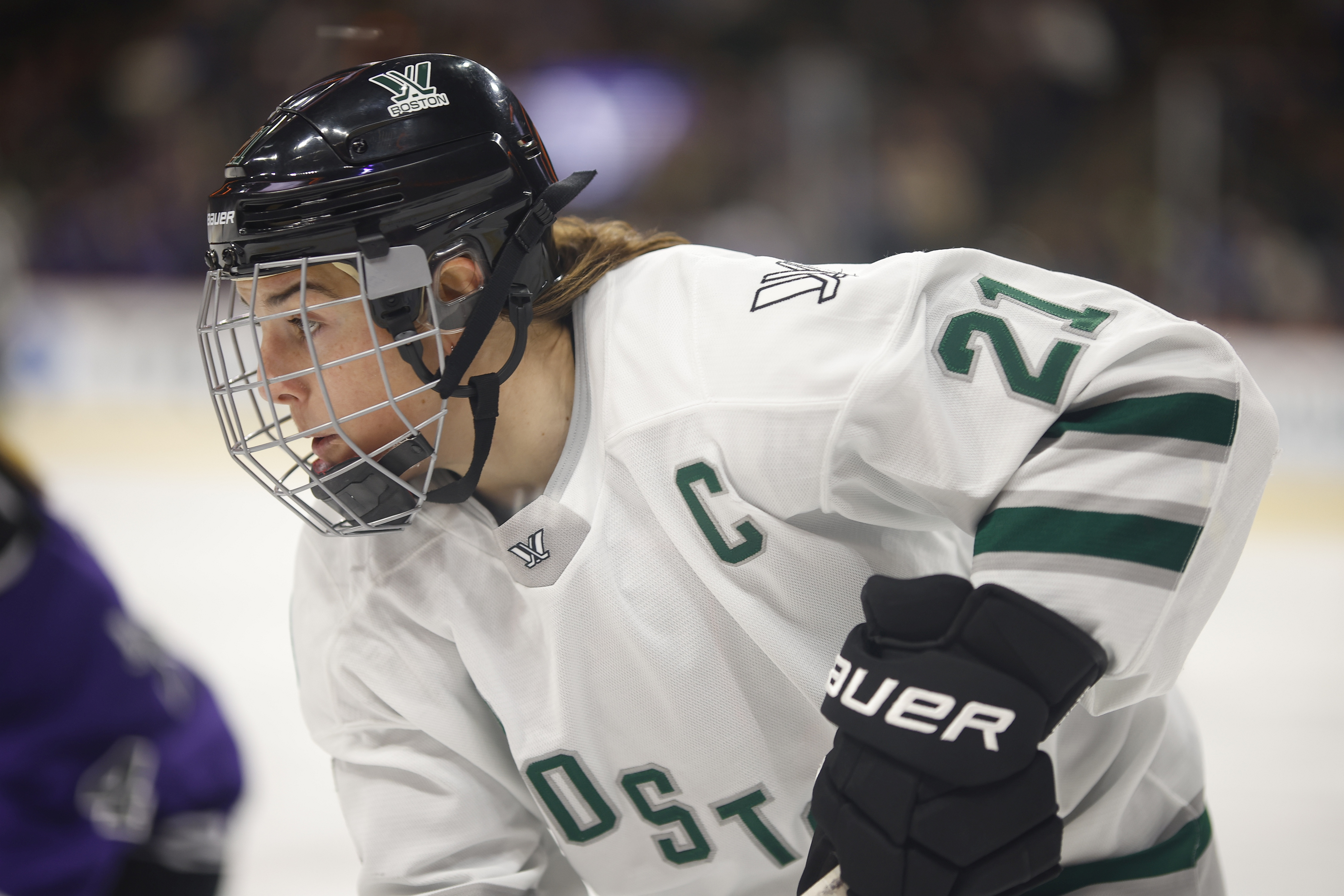
Hilary Knight, the first captain in franchise history.

The Boston Fleet are a professional women's ice hockey team based in Boston, Massachusetts, United States, and compete in the Professional Women's Hockey League (PWHL). Founded on August 29, 2023, the Fleet are one of the league's six original franchises. The team plays its home games at the Tsongas Center in Lowell, Massachusetts, and represents the latest chapter in Boston's long tradition as one of the premier markets for women's hockey. As one of the PWHL's three original American franchises, the Fleet have played a prominent role in the league's growth and development since its founding.

The franchise competed under the temporary name "PWHL Boston" during the league's inaugural season before unveiling its permanent identity as the Boston Fleet on September 9, 2024. The name was chosen to reflect movement, strength, and unity, drawing inspiration from Boston's maritime history and the collective power of a fleet moving toward a common goal. The team's branding emphasizes speed, resilience, and teamwork, reflecting both the city's sporting culture and the fast-paced nature of professional hockey.

Boston assembled its inaugural roster through the league's founding player signings and inaugural draft, building around a core that included American national team stars Hilary Knight, Megan Keller, and Aerin Frankel. Knight was named the franchise's first captain and quickly became the face of the organization, while Frankel established herself as one of the league's elite goaltenders. Keller emerged as the cornerstone of Boston's blue line, helping shape the team's identity as a disciplined and defensively sound contender.

The Fleet opened the inaugural PWHL season on January 3, 2024, against Minnesota. Theresa Schafzahl scored the first goal in franchise history during the contest, while Boston earned its first victory on January 13 with a 3–2 overtime win over Montreal. On February 25, 2024, Frankel recorded the first shutout in franchise history in a victory over Minnesota. Boston finished the inaugural season in fourth place and qualified for the league's first playoffs, where they advanced to the Walter Cup Final after defeating Montreal in the semifinals. The Fleet ultimately fell to Minnesota in a hard-fought five-game championship series.

During the 2024–25 PWHL season, Boston remained among the league's top contenders and returned to the postseason behind the leadership of Knight, Keller, and Frankel. The club continued to be one of the league's strongest defensive teams, anchored by Frankel's goaltending and a veteran core that consistently kept the Fleet in championship contention. Several players earned league recognition during the season, while the team's passionate fan support further solidified Boston as one of the PWHL's flagship markets. In addition to their regular schedule, the Fleet participated in the 2025 PWHL Takeover Tour, playing neutral-site games in Seattle, Buffalo, and St. Louis, posting a 2–1 record and helping expand the league’s fan base across North America.

In the 2025–26 PWHL season, Boston once again qualified for the playoffs despite roster changes brought on by league expansion. The Fleet were ultimately eliminated in four games by the Ottawa Charge in the semifinal, but the season further reinforced Boston's reputation as one of the league's most consistent organizations.

As of the end of the 2025–26 season, a total of 51 players have appeared in at least one game for the Boston Fleet, including 5 goaltenders and 46 skaters.

== Key ==
Key of colors and symbols
#	Number worn for majority of tenure with the Fleet
WC	Walter Cup Champion
*	Current member of the Fleet organization (including reserves)
†	Walter Cup champion, retired jersey, or elected to the Hockey Hall of Fame

Skaters
Pos	Position
D	Defenseman
F	Forward

The seasons column lists the first year of the season of the player's first game and the last year of the season of the player's last game. For example, a player who played one game in the 2023–24 season would be listed as playing with the team from 2023–24, regardless of what calendar year the game occurred within.

Statistics are complete to the end of the 2025–26 PWHL season.

== Goaltenders ==
Note: GP = Games played; Min, TOI = Minutes played; W = Wins; L = Losses; OTL = Overtime losses; GA = Goals-against; GAA = Goals-against average; SO = Shutouts; SV% = Save percentage;

Name	#	Nationality	Seasons	Regular season							Playoffs						Notes
Name	#	Nationality	Seasons	GP	W	L	OTL	SO	GAA	SV%	GP	W	L	SO	GAA	SV%	Notes
Frankel, Aerin*	31	United States	2023–present	67	39	18	9	10	1.77	.935	12	6	6	1	1.64	.941	PWHL Goaltender of the Year 2026; Billie Jean King MVP Award 2026
Levy, Abbey	39	United States	2025–2026	3	1	1	1	0	2.00	.913	0	0	0	0	0.00	.000	
Peslarová, Klára	29	Czech Republic	2024–2025	4	2	0	1	1	1.79	.937	0	0	0	0	0.00	.000	
Söderberg, Emma	30	Sweden	2023–2025	14	5	5	1	0	2.80	.893	0	0	0	0	0.00	.000	
Thiele, Amanda*	30	United States	2025–present	1	1	0	0	0	2.00	.913	0	0	0	0	0.00	.000	

== Skaters ==
Note: GP = Games played; G = Goals; A = Assists; Pts = Points; PIM = Penalty minutes;

Name	#	Nationality	Pos	Seasons	Regular season					Playoffs					Notes
Name	#	Nationality	Pos	Seasons	GP	G	A	Pts	PIM	GP	G	A	Pts	PIM	Notes
Adzija, Lexie	88	Canada	F	2023–2025	36	3	6	9	8	8	1	0	1	7	
Babstock, Kelly	8	Canada	F	2023–2025	13	0	1	1	11	8	0	0	0	4	
Bard, Sydney	15	United States	D	2024–2025	27	1	2	3	14	0	0	0	0	0	
Bilka, Hannah	19	United States	F	2024–2025	16	5	6	11	6	0	0	0	0	0	
Biotti, Mia	7	United States	D	2025–2026	13	0	2	2	0	2	0	0	0	2	
Boyd, Zoe	3	Canada	D	2025–2026	12	0	1	1	4	0	0	0	0	0	
Brandt, Hannah	20	United States	F	2023–2026	84	8	16	24	30	12	1	1	2	4	
Brengman, Riley	16	United States	D	2025–2026	28	2	1	3	14	4	0	0	0	2	
Brown, Emily	2	United States	D	2023–2025	53	2	6	8	28	8	0	2	2	0	
Cook, Abby	18	Canada	D	2023–2024	9	1	0	1	2	2	0	0	0	0	
Darkangelo, Shiann	27	United States	F	2023–2024	17	0	1	1	0	0	0	0	0	0	
Dempsey, Jillian	14	United States	F	2024–2025	9	0	2	2	0	0	0	0	0	0	
DiGirolamo, Jessica	22	Canada	D	2023–2025	54	1	7	8	20	8	0	0	0	2	
Eldridge, Jessie*	18	Canada	F	2025–present	11	7	3	10	0	4	0	3	3	4	
Fratkin, Kaleigh	13	Canada	D	2023–2024	24	2	1	3	26	8	0	0	0	8	
Gabel, Loren*	36	Canada	F	2023–present	53	7	5	12	14	6	0	0	0	0	
Girard, Taylor	17	United States	F	2023–2025	28	4	2	6	10	0	0	0	0	0	
Greco, Emma	25	Canada	D	2024–2025	28	0	3	3	8	0	0	0	0	0	
Hartmetz, Hadley	6	United States	D	2024–2026	29	0	7	7	8	4	0	0	0	0	
Healey, Jessica	97	Canada	D	2023–2024	22	1	2	3	8	8	1	0	1	0	
Huber, Ella*	26	United States	F	2025–present	30	4	2	6	12	4	0	2	2	0	
Isbell, Samantha	55	Canada	D	2023–2024	3	0	0	0	0	0	0	0	0	0	
Jaques, Sophie	7	Canada	D	2023–2024	7	0	0	0	0	0	0	0	0	0	
Keller, Megan*	5	United States	D	2023–present	84	16	34	50	38	12	2	4	6	12	PWHL Defender of the Year 2026; Captain 2025–present
Kluge, Laura*	25	Germany	F	2025–present	25	1	1	2	25	2	0	0	0	0	
Knight, Hilary	21	United States	F	2023–2025	54	21	19	40	18	8	0	0	0	2	PWHL Points Leader Award (Tied) 2025; Captain 2023–2025
Kosta, Nicole	77	Canada	F	2023–2024	10	1	2	3	2	2	0	0	0	0	
MacKinnon, Rylind*	53	Canada	D	2025–present	28	0	1	1	14	3	0	0	0	15	
Maloney, Shay*	27	United States	F	2024–present	60	6	10	16	18	4	1	1	2	0	
Marvin, Gigi	19	United States	F	2023–2024	24	1	3	4	6	8	0	3	3	0	
Mobley, Olivia*	15	United States	F	2025–present	10	3	2	5	4	4	0	0	0	2	
Morin, Sidney	7	United States	D	2023–2025	54	4	8	12	12	8	0	2	2	0	
Müller, Alina	11	Switzerland	F	2023–2026	80	16	40	56	22	12	3	4	7	2	
Neubauerová, Noemi*	81	Czech Republic	D	2025–present	3	0	0	0	2	1	0	0	0	0	
Newhook, Abby*	19	Canada	F	2025–present	29	7	7	14	6	4	0	1	1	0	
Pejšová, Daniela	55	Czech Republic	D	2024–2026	55	2	5	7	14	4	0	0	0	4	
Pelkey, Amanda	16	United States	F	2023–2025	48	4	3	7	18	8	2	1	3	0	
Rattray, Jamie Lee	47	Canada	F	2023–2026	84	11	22	33	26	10	1	1	2	6	Intact Impact Award 2025
Saulnier, Jill*	44	Canada	F	2024–present	44	4	7	11	32	4	0	1	1	2	
Schafzahl, Theresa	37	Austria	F	2023–2026	69	8	9	17	6	8	0	3	3	0	
Schepers, Liz*	13	United States	F	2025–present	29	5	4	9	2	4	1	0	1	0	
Shirley, Sophie*	9	Canada	F	2023–present	70	6	13	19	43	12	2	1	3	0	
Tapani, Susanna*	77	Finland	F	2023–present	77	22	22	44	26	12	3	1	4	2	
Wenczkowski, Taylor	12	United States	F	2023–2024	16	0	0	0	2	8	2	0	2	2	
Winn, Haley*	8	United States	D	2025–present	30	5	14	19	6	4	0	2	2	2	PWHL Rookie of the Year 2026
Zafuto, Olivia*	73	United States	D	2025–present	6	0	0	0	0	0	0	0	0	0	
