= Hannah Murphy =

Canadian ice hockey player (born 2003)

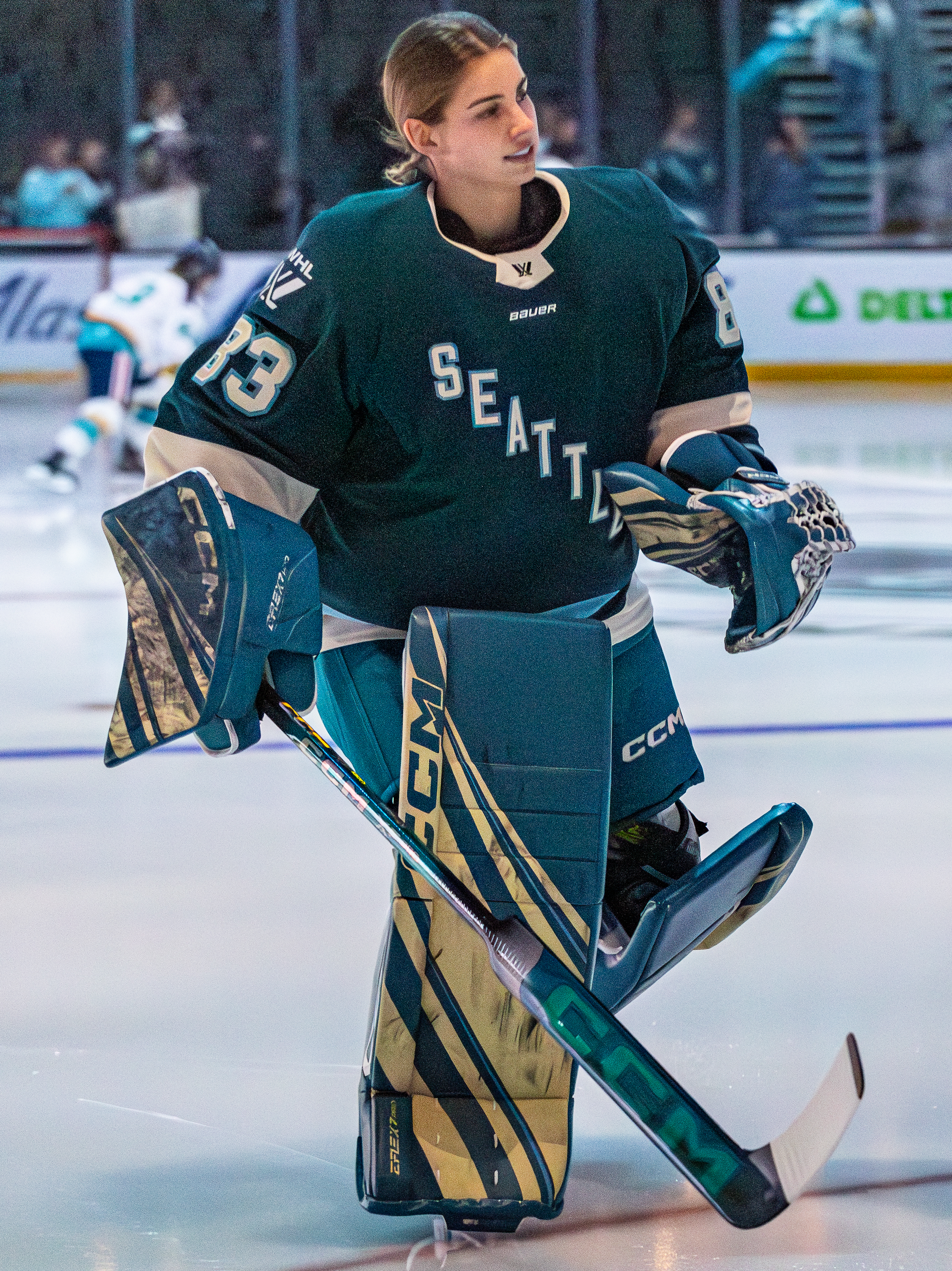
- Murphy with the Seattle Torrent in 2025
- Born: August 3, 2003 (age 23) Bradford, Ontario, Canada
- Height: 5 ft 10 in (178 cm)
- Weight: 158 lb (72 kg; 11 st 4 lb)
- Position: Goaltender
- Catches: Left
- PWHL team: Seattle Torrent
- National team: Canada

Hannah Murphy (born August 3, 2003) is a Canadian ice hockey goaltender for the Seattle Torrent of the Professional Women's Hockey League (PWHL). She played college ice hockey at Colgate, where she became the program's all-time leader in shutouts and set records for best goals-against average and save percentage.

Murphy was selected 15th overall by Seattle in the 2025 PWHL Draft, becoming the first goaltender chosen. She made her PWHL debut on December 3, 2025, recording 23 saves in Seattle's first franchise victory, a 2–1 win over the New York Sirens. She was the first rookie goaltender to debut in the PWHL's 2025–26 season and only the second rookie goaltender in league history to win their debut game.

Internationally, Murphy represented Canada on the National Women's Development Team for three consecutive years (2022–2024), earning a silver medal at the 2024–25 Women's Euro Hockey Tour and recording her first international shutout against Czechia.

== Early life ==
Born in Kingston, Ontario, to parents Rebecca and Paul Murphy, Hannah was raised about an hour north of Toronto in Bradford, Ontario. She has one older sibling, Lee, who was also a goaltender and served as a role model for Murphy.

Murphy began playing hockey at age four and became a goaltender almost immediately, volunteering to play the position when her team's goalie was injured or sick, and never took the pads off since. She attended Bradford District High School where she was a multi-sport athlete, competing in hockey, volleyball, and track and field. She played in the Ontario Provincial Women's Hockey League prior to college, playing seven seasons with the Aurora Panthers and five seasons with the Napanee Crunch. She also played AA hockey with the Central York Panthers and the Toronto Arrows.

== Playing career ==
=== College ===
Murphy played four years of college ice hockey with Colgate University on a full athletic scholarship. She helped win three ECAC Hockey tournament championships and a regular season championship. She led ECAC in save percentage her final three seasons, achieving a career-best .947 SV% in her senior year, while making 30.2 saves per game (the highest in the conference).

Murphy received the Goalie of the Month award for the week of February 1, 2024 for boasting a 5-0-0 record with 98 saves, allowing only 3 goals, and achieving 3 shutouts in 4 games. She was named to the Women's Hockey Commissioners Association Goalie of the Year Watchlist three seasons in a row (2022–23, 2023–24, and 2024–25)..

On February 14, 2025 versus Yale, Murphy recorded her 19th career shutout, setting a program record. Neena Brick and Alexis Petford contributed multi point performances in the 3-0 win.

Murphy graduated holding the Colgate program records for shutouts (15), wins in a season, best goals against average (season and career), and best save percentage (season and career). She served as the captain her senior year.. She graduated from Colgate University with a Bachelor of Arts in Mathematical Economics and a minor in Writing & Rhetoric.

=== Professional ===
==== Seattle Torrent (2025–present) ====
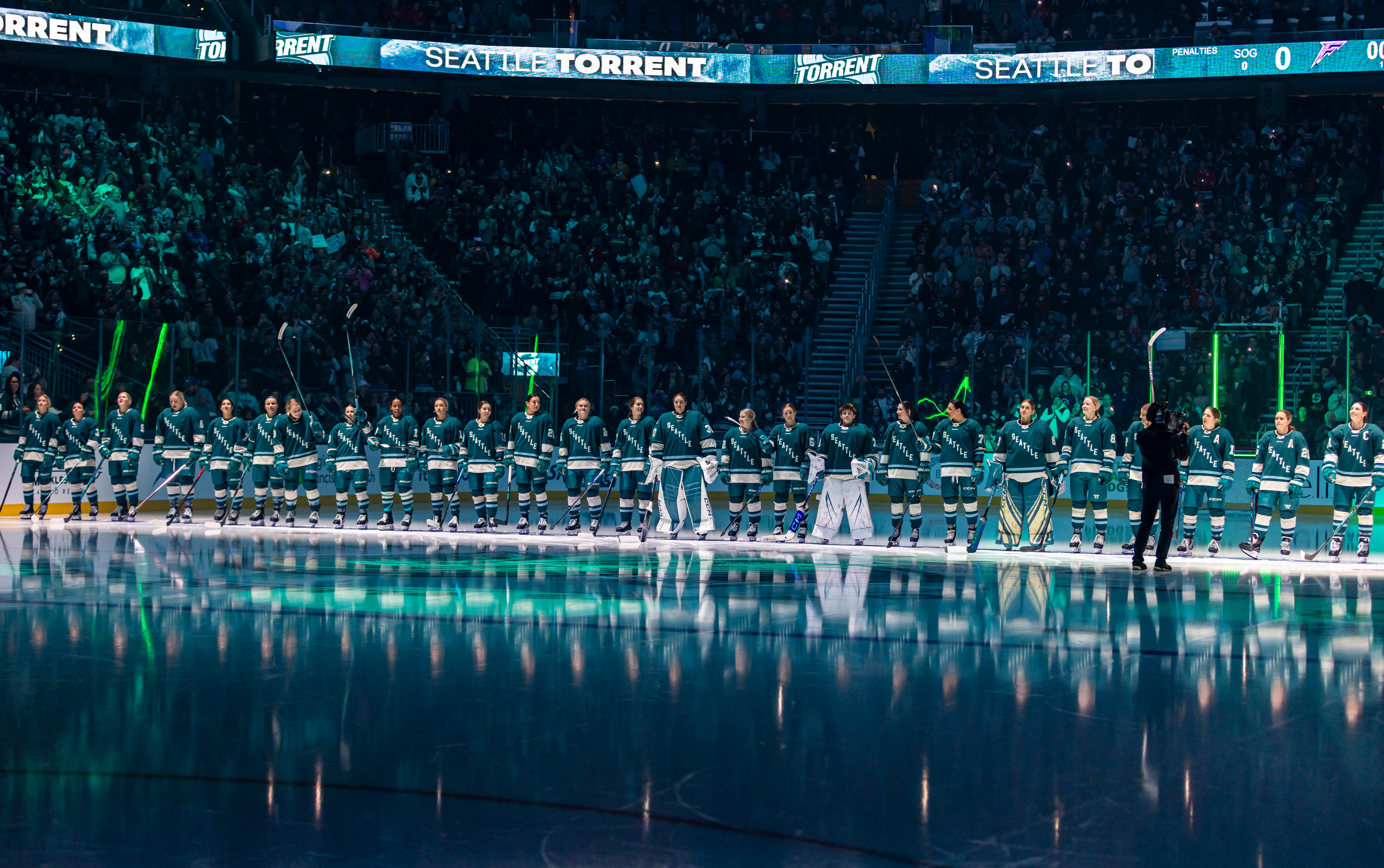
Murphy and her teammates during the Torrent's record-breaking inaugural home game at Climate Pledge Arena, November 2025

Murphy declared for the 2025 PWHL Draft and was considered a top goalie prospect. She was drafted in the second round, fifteenth overall, by PWHL Seattle. On July 16, 2025, she signed a two-year contract with Seattle. On November 28, 2025, the Torrent played their inaugural home opener at Climate Pledge Arena against the Minnesota Frost, drawing a record crowd of 16,014 fans. This broke the attendance record for the largest crowd at a women's hockey game in a U.S. arena and set the highest attended home venue game in PWHL history.

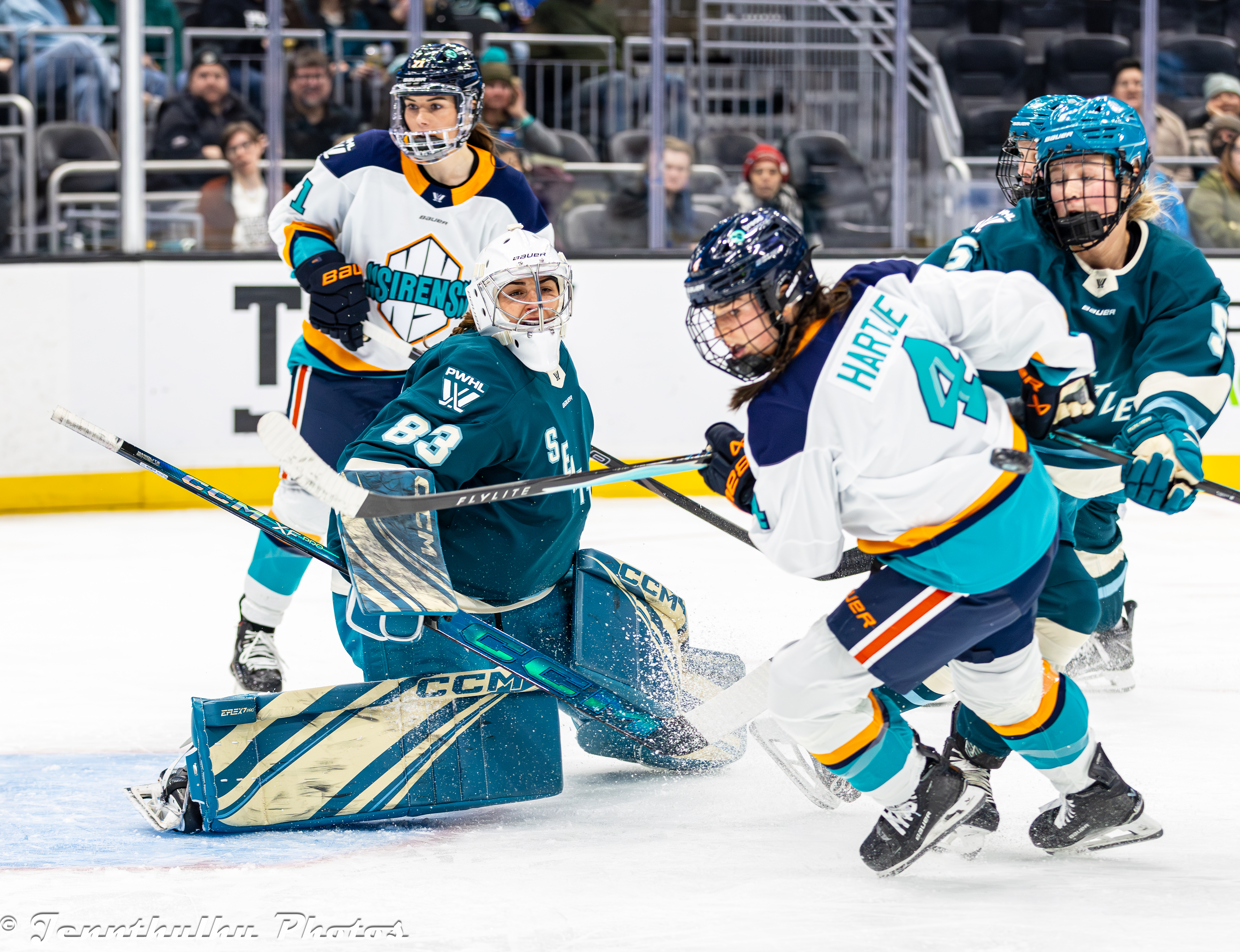
Murphy defends against New York Sirens during her professional debut at Climate Pledge Arena, December 3, 2025

Murphy made her professional debut on December 3, 2025 during a mid-week home game against the New York Sirens in front of 8,622 fans. She made 23 saves in the Torrent's first franchise win, a 2-1 victory. Murphy allowed only one goal, scored by Paetyn Levis at 3:15 of the first period, and faced her former Colgate teammate Kayle Osborne in the opposing net. The Seattle crowd chanted Murphy's name throughout the game in recognition of her performance. Murphy said of the experience: "It was an awesome experience, starting in the locker room with all the girls being so supportive, and then coming out to the Seattle fanbase was unbelievable and unlike anything I've ever experienced. To cap it off with the win was awesome." With the victory, Murphy became the first rookie goaltender to debut in the PWHL's 2025-26 season and the second rookie goaltender in PWHL history to win their first game, following Boston's Emma Söderberg on January 17, 2024. The Torrent won the game with two power play goals in the final 1:24 of the third period, scored by Alex Carpenter and Hilary Knight. On December 17, 2025, Murphy made 24 saves in her second career start as the Torrent defeated the Ottawa Charge 4-1. Murphy's shutout bid was spoiled with 37 seconds remaining when Rebecca Leslie scored for Ottawa. The victory gave Murphy two wins in her first two career appearances, both starts. Murphy was named second star of the game, with teammate Alex Carpenter earning first star and Hannah Bilka receiving third star honors.

On December 23, 2025, Murphy earned her third consecutive victory in a 2–1 win over the Montreal Victoire before 10,276 fans at Climate Pledge Arena. She made 33 saves to outduel 2024–25 PWHL Goaltender of the Year Ann-Renée Desbiens in the first-ever meeting between the two franchises. With the victory, Murphy became the first goaltender in PWHL history to win their first three career starts, maintaining a perfect 3–0 record with a 1.00 goals-against average through three games. Murphy's performance was particularly impressive as she faced Montreal's offensive pressure in the final minutes when the Victoire pulled Desbiens for an extra attacker. Following the game, Murphy was serenaded with chants of "Murphy, Murphy!" from the Seattle crowd during her postgame television interview and earned First Star of the Night honors.

== International play ==
Murphy was selected to Canada's National Women's Development Team for three consecutive years beginning in 2022. In August 2022, Murphy attended Hockey Canada's National Women's Program selection camp in Calgary. During the 11-day camp, she played alongside and against the Canadian women who had won Olympic gold just months earlier and earned a spot on the National Women's Development Team and competed in a three-game series against the United States in August 2022 at WinSport's Canada Olympic Park, where she made one appearance and stopped 32 shots with a .889 save percentage. Murphy returned to the development team in August 2023 for the Collegiate Select Series against the United States, making two starts and recording 69 saves with a .884 save percentage. In August 2024, Murphy was named to Canada's National Women's Development Team for a third consecutive year for a three-game series against the United States in Lake Placid, New York.

Following the summer series, she was selected to represent Canada at the 2024–25 Women's Euro Hockey Tour Six Nations Tournament in Tampere, Finland in December 2024. Murphy achieved her first international career shutout against Czechia at the tournament, where Canada won a silver medal. Prior to the tournament, Murphy recorded 78 saves in two games against the United States in August 2024.

== Career statistics ==
=== Regular season and playoffs ===
| | | | Regular season | | | | | | | | | Playoffs |
| Season | Team | League | GP | W | L | T | MIN | GA | SO | GAA | SV% | GP | W | L | MIN | GA | SO | GAA | SV% |
|---|---|---|---|---|---|---|---|---|---|---|---|---|---|---|---|---|---|---|---|
| 2021–22 | Colgate University | NCAA | 20 | 17 | 3 | 0 | 1206:48 | 30 | 4 | 1.49 | .930 | — | — | — | — | — | — | — | — |
| 2022–23 | Colgate University | NCAA | 23 | 18 | 2 | 1 | 1294:45 | 33 | 5 | 1.53 | .932 | — | — | — | — | — | — | — | — |
| 2023–24 | Colgate University | NCAA | 22 | 12 | 3 | 0 | 884:35 | 18 | 6 | 1.22 | .946 | — | — | — | — | — | — | — | — |
| 2024–25 | Colgate University | NCAA | 34 | 26 | 8 | 0 | 2036:07 | 63 | 3 | 1.86 | .939 | — | — | — | — | — | — | — | — |
| 2025–26 | Seattle Torrent | PWHL | 12 | 4 | 8 | 0 | 710:00 | 34 | 0 | 2.87 | .908 | — | — | — | — | — | — | — | — |
| NCAA Totals | | | 99 | 73 | 16 | 1 | 5422:15 | 144 | 18 | 1.59 | .937 | — | — | — | — | — | — | — | — |
| PWHL Totals | | | 12 | 4 | 8 | 0 | 710:00 | 34 | 0 | 2.87 | .908 | — | — | — | — | — | — | — | — |

== Awards and honors ==
| Honors | Year |
College
| ECAC Hockey All-Tournament Team | 2023 |
| ECAC Hockey All-Second Team | 2023, 2025 |
| ECAC Hockey All-Third Team | 2024 |
| ECAC Hockey All-Academic Team | 2022, 2023, 2024 |
| All-Rookie Team | 2026 |
