= Sarah Wozniewicz =

Canadian ice hockey player (born 2003)

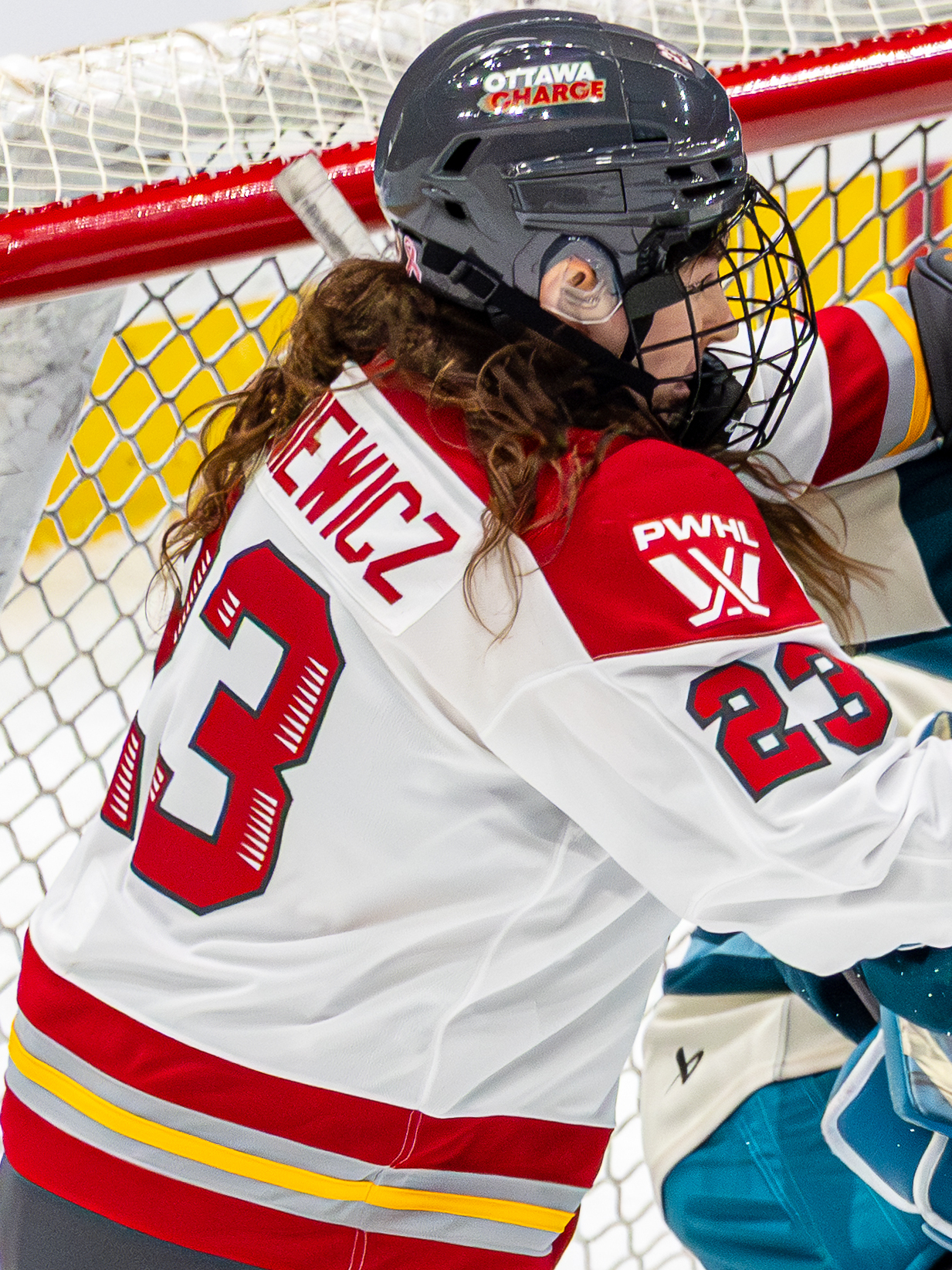
- Wozniewicz with the Ottawa Charge in 2025
- Born: August 25, 2003 (age 23) Cochrane, Alberta, Canada
- Height: 5 ft 7 in (170 cm)
- Position: Forward
- Shoots: Right
- PWHL team: Ottawa Charge
- National team: Canada
- Playing career: 2021–present

Sarah Wozniewicz (born August 25, 2003) is a Canadian ice hockey forward for the Ottawa Charge of the Professional Women's Hockey League (PWHL). She played college ice hockey at Wisconsin.

== Early life ==
Wozniewicz was born to John and Rhona Wozniewicz and has one brother, Eric. She attended Edge School where she played ice hockey. She was named the Canadian Sport School Hockey League (CSSHL) Female Prep Freshman of the Year in 2019 and the CSSHL Female Prep Most Valuable Player of the Year in 2020.

On December 14, 2020, she signed her national letter of intent to play college ice hockey at Wisconsin.

== Playing career ==
=== Canada Winter Games ===
Wozniewicz played on Team Alberta for the U18 2019 Canada Winter Games. Team Alberta won the tournament 2-1 over Team Quebec. Wozniewicz was the top scorer for Alberta with four goals and an assist.

=== College ===
Wozniewicz began her collegiate career for Wisconsin during the 2021–22 season, where she recorded ten goals and nine assists in 36 games. She scored her first career goal on October 1, 2021, in a game against Merrimack. Her 19 points ranked third among WCHA rookies. Following the season she was named to the WCHA All-Rookie Team.

During the 2022–23 season, in her sophomore year, she recorded six goals and eight assists in 40 games and helped lead Wisconsin to their seventh national championship. During the 2023–24 season, in her junior year, she recorded 11 goals and six assists in 36 games.

During the 2024–25 season, in her senior year, she recorded nine goals and 12 assists in 41 games. During the finals of the 2025 WCHA tournament against Minnesota, she scored the game-winning goal with 25 second remaining in the game to help Wisconsin win the WCHA championship and automatically qualify for the 2025 NCAA Division I women's ice hockey tournament. She helped Wisconsin win their eighth national championship.

=== Professional ===
On June 24, 2025, Wozniewicz was drafted in the third round, 21st overall, by the Ottawa Charge in the 2025 PWHL Draft. On July 11, 2025, she signed a one-year contract with the Charge. Her first three goals with the team were game-winners. She had the most goals and assists of any rookie in her first playoffs, two of each. Wozniewicz signed a 3-year with the Charge, announced July 10, 2026.

== International play ==
Medal record

Representing Canada

Ice hockey

World Championships
Silver medal – second place	2026 Denmark	

World U18 Championship
Silver medal – second place	2020 Slovakia	

On August 12, 2019, Wozniewicz was selected to represent Canada at the 2020 IIHF World Women's U18 Championship. During the tournament she recorded one assist in five games and won a silver medal.

She is making her senior national team in 2026, being named to the roster for the 2026 IIHF Women's World Championship.

== Career statistics ==
=== Regular season and playoffs ===
			Regular season					Playoffs
Season	Team	League	GP	G	A	Pts	PIM	GP	G	A	Pts	PIM
2021–22	University of Wisconsin	WCHA	36	10	9	19	4	—	—	—	—	—
2022–23	University of Wisconsin	WCHA	40	6	8	14	6	—	—	—	—	—
2023–24	University of Wisconsin	WCHA	36	11	6	17	4	—	—	—	—	—
2024–25	University of Wisconsin	WCHA	41	9	12	21	19	—	—	—	—	—
2025–26	Ottawa Charge	PWHL	30	7	6	13	8	8	2	2	4	2
NCAA totals			153	36	35	71	33	—	—	—	—	—
PWHL totals			30	7	6	13	8	8	2	2	4	2

=== International ===
Year	Team	Event	Result	GP	G	A	Pts	PIM
2020	Canada	U18	2nd place, silver medalist(s)	5	0	1	1	2
2026	Canada	WC
Junior totals				5	0	1	1	2

== Awards and honours ==
=== CSSHL ===
- Female Prep Freshman of the Year: 2019
- Female Prep Most Valuable Player of the Year: 2020

=== WHCA ===
- All-Academic Team: 2023, 2024, 2025
- All-Rookie Team: 2022
- All-Tournament Team: 2025

=== Team Canada ===
- IIHF U18 Women's World Hockey Championship silver medallist: 2020

== Personal life ==
Outside of hockey, Wozniewicz enjoys hiking and golfing. She is related to Laura Mckenzie who competes for the Great Britain Rowing in beach sprints.
