= Caitlin Kraemer =

Canadian ice hockey player (born 2006)

- Born: May 29, 2006 (age 20) Kitchener, Ontario, Canada
- Height: 5 ft 9 in (175 cm)
- Position: Forward
- Shoots: Left
- NCAA team: University of Minnesota Duluth
- National team: Canada

Caitlin Kraemer (born May 29, 2006) is a Canadian ice hockey player who is a forward for the University of Minnesota Duluth of the National Collegiate Athletic Association (NCAA). At the 2023 and 2024 IIHF World Women's U18 Championships she broke multiple records including Canadian goal-scoring records previously held by Marie-Philip Poulin.

== Playing career ==
Kraemer played junior hockey for the Kitchener-Waterloo Jr. Rangers of the Ontario Women's Hockey League, beginning in the 2020–21 season. She served as alternate captain in the 2021–22 season, and captain beginning in the 2022–23 season. Entering the 2023–24 season, the Rangers were rebranded as the Waterloo Ravens. In November 2023, Kraemer committed to play college ice hockey for the University of Minnesota Duluth.

Kraemer recorded her first collegiate points in the second game of her Bulldogs career, a 4–3 victory over Ohio State University on September 22, 2024, in which she posted two goals and an assist for a game-leading three points, including the game-winning goal.

On June 29, 2026, it was announced that Kraemer, along with Chloe Primerano and Abbey Murphy, would be attending the development camp of the National Hockey League's Edmonton Oilers alongside the team's prospects and other camp invites.

== International play ==
Medal record

Representing Canada

Women's ice hockey

World Championships
Silver medal – second place	2026 Denmark	

World U18 Championship
Gold medal – first place	2023 Sweden	
Bronze medal – third place	2024 Switzerland	

Kraemer made her international debut representing Canada at the 2023 IIHF World Women's U18 Championship. She finished the tournament with 10 goals and 11 points, one point behind tournament leader Nela Lopušanová, and was named to the tournament's all-star team by attending media.

Her third of four goals in the 10–0 gold medal victory over Sweden broke multiple tournament records, including fastest hat-trick from the start of a game, completed at 12:00 of the first period; fastest three goals, scoring three in 6:44 to beat the previous record held by American Kendall Coyne Schofield by just seven seconds; and most goals scored by a Canadian in a single tournament, surpassing previous record holder Marie-Philip Poulin, who scored eight goals at the 2008 championship. She fell one goal short of the single-tournament goals record, held by American Haley Skarupa.

Returning for the 2024 U18 Championship, Kraemer was named alternate captain of the Canadian team. Winning the bronze medal, she finished with 10 goals for the second straight year, setting the Canadian record for career goals at the championship with 20 and ending her under-18 career just shy of Coyne Schofield's record of 22 goals, accomplished over three years. She also became Canada's all-time under-18 points leader.

Kraemer played for Canada's National Women's Development Team at the 2024 Six Nations tournament in December 2024, part of the 2024–25 Euro Hockey Tour.

Kraemer was named to the senior national team in 2026 for the 2026 IIHF Women's World Championship.

== Personal life ==
Kraemer is the daughter of Chris and Connie Kraemer. She has three sisters, Kayla, Abby, and Ashley. She attended Resurrection Catholic Secondary School, graduating in 2024. In addition to ice hockey, she has played varsity field hockey and competitive soccer.

== Career statistics ==
=== Regular season and playoffs ===
			Regular season					Playoffs
Season	Team	League	GP	G	A	Pts	PIM	GP	G	A	Pts	PIM
2021–22	Kitchener-Waterloo Jr. Rangers	OWHL	27	14	8	22	31	—	—	—	—	—
2022–23	Kitchener-Waterloo Jr. Rangers	OWHL	16	16	12	28	42	—	—	—	—	—
2023–24	Waterloo Ravens	OWHL	31	23	31	54	94	—	—	—	—	—
2024–25	University of Minnesota Duluth	WCHA	39	18	13	31	47	—	—	—	—	—
2025–26	University of Minnesota Duluth	WCHA	36	15	15	30	64	—	—	—	—	—
NCAA totals			75	33	28	61	111	—	—	—	—	—

=== International ===
Year	Team	Event	Result	GP	G	A	Pts	PIM
2023	Canada	U18	1st place, gold medalist(s)	5	10	1	11	6
2024	Canada	U18	3rd place, bronze medalist(s)	6	10	0	10	2
Junior totals				11	20	1	21	8

== Awards and honours ==
Award	Year	Ref
WCHA
All-Rookie Team	2025	
Rookie of the Year	2025	
International
World U18 Championship – Media All-Star Team	2023	
Other
Kitchener-Waterloo Athlete of the Year	2023	
