= Chloe Primerano =

Canadian ice hockey player (born 2007)

- Born: January 2, 2007 (age 19) North Vancouver, British Columbia, Canada
- Height: 5 ft 8 in (173 cm)
- Weight: 134 lb (61 kg; 9 st 8 lb)
- Position: Defence
- Shoots: Left
- NCAA team: University of Minnesota
- National team: Canada
- Playing career: 2023–present

Chloe Primerano (born January 2, 2007) is a Canadian college ice hockey player who is a defender for the University of Minnesota of the National Collegiate Athletic Association (NCAA). She was the first female skater to be selected in a Canadian Hockey League draft.

== Early life ==
Primerano was born on January 2, 2007, in North Vancouver, to parents Joe and Fiona Primerano. She began playing ice hockey around the age of two or three, and would frequently play against male opponents.

== Playing career ==
Primerano played minor ice hockey with the Burnaby Winter Club U15 program, where during the 2021–22 season she scored two goals and 19 points in 30 regular season games. In the postseason, she added two assists in three playoff games. Scouts were impressed with Primerano's play against boys with Burnaby, saying that she was sometimes "the best defender on the ice on either team."

On May 19, 2022, the Vancouver Giants of the Western Hockey League (WHL) selected Primerano 268th overall, in the 13th round of the WHL Prospects Draft. While there have previously been female goaltenders in the Canadian Hockey League (CHL), Primerano is the first female skater to be drafted by a CHL team.

As a 15-year-old draft pick, Primerano was eligible to play a few games for the Giants during the 2022–23 WHL season. However, she ultimately played the entire season for RINK Academy in Kelowna, British Columbia, in the Women's U18 division of the Canadian School Sport Hockey League (CSSHL), where she set league records for points by a defenceman, with 48 points in 30 games. She led RINK scoring both in the regular season and in the playoffs, where her 11 points in five games helped RINK to win their second consecutive championship.

In the summer of 2023, Primerano became the first female skater to attend the Creative Artists Agency camp, joining top under-18 boys including top 2024 NHL entry draft-eligible prospects such as Ryder Ritchie, the 2023 WHL rookie of the year, and Berkly Catton, future eighth overall pick of the Seattle Kraken.

The following year, the 2023–24 season, Primerano chose to stay at RINK Academy, where she recorded 35 goals and 89 points in 29 games and was named a first team all-star. She recorded a point in all but one regular season game, beginning the year on a points streak of 19 games. She recorded at least three points in 17 games, in which she recorded five points three times and six points three times. In the playoffs, she recorded six goals and nineteen points including six points in the championship-clinching match to secure her second and RINK's third consecutive title. Her 14 assists were more than any other player had points in the postseason. In November 2023, Primerano announced her commitment to the University of Minnesota, and in February 2024 it was announced that she would join the team a year early, for the 2024–25 season. Her defence partner at RINK, Gracie Graham, also committed to the university.

Entering her first season of college ice hockey with high expectations, Primerano recorded her first collegiate goal in her first collegiate game, the third tally for the Golden Gophers in a 4–1 victory over the University of Connecticut.

On June 29, 2026, it was announced that Primerano, along with Caitlin Kraemer and Abbey Murphy, would be attending the development camp of the National Hockey League's Edmonton Oilers alongside the team's prospects and other camp invites.

== International play ==
Medal record

Representing Canada

Women's ice hockey

World Championships
Silver medal – second place	2025 Czechia	
Silver medal – second place	2026 Denmark	

World U18 Championships
Gold medal – first place	2025 Finland	
Bronze medal – third place	2024 Switzerland	

Primerano made her International Ice Hockey Federation (IIHF) tournament debut representing Canada at the 2024 IIHF World Women's U18 Championship. She scored 16 points (8 goals, 8 assists) en route to a bronze medal, setting a single-tournament record for points by a defender and the second highest total by any player, behind American forward Amanda Kessel and her 19 points in 2009. She was named tournament MVP, best defender, and a member of the media all-star team. Later in the year she made her senior national team debut on November 6, 2024, playing in the Canada-USA Rivalry Series.

In 2025, Primerano rejoined the national under-18 team for the 2025 IIHF World Women's U18 Championship, and was named the team captain. She was the first woman to play for Canada's under-18 and senior national teams in the same season since Marie-Philip Poulin in 2008–09. Following the disappointing bronze medal finish the prior year, this time Canada reached the event final and defeated the United States for the gold medal. Primerano registered four goals and ten points, again being named the event's best defender and to the media all-star team. With 26 points across two tournaments, she equalled Poulin's record for cumulative points at the U18 World Championship.

In 2026, she was named to the senior national team roster again for the 2026 IIHF Women's World Championship in November.

== Personal life ==
Primerano's older brother Luca is also an ice hockey player. In 2022, he joined the Prince George Spruce Kings of the British Columbia Hockey League. Until her enrollment at RINK Academy in 2022, Chloe attended Burnaby Central Secondary School, where, in addition to hockey, she played basketball and soccer. Luca also attended the school.

== Career statistics ==
=== Regular season and playoffs ===
			Regular season					Playoffs
Season	Team	League	GP	G	A	Pts	PIM	GP	G	A	Pts	PIM
2024–25	Minnesota Golden Gophers	WCHA	35	5	26	31	18	—	—	—	—	—
NCAA totals			35	5	26	31	18	—	—	—	—	—

=== International ===
Year	Team	Event	Result	GP	G	A	Pts	PIM
2024	Canada	U18	3rd place, bronze medalist(s)	6	8	8	16	2
2025	Canada	U18	1st place, gold medalist(s)	6	4	6	10	0
2025	Canada	WC	2nd place, silver medalist(s)	6	0	0	0	0
Junior totals				12	12	14	26	2
Senior totals				6	0	0	0	0

== Awards and honours ==
Award	Year	Ref
International
World U18 Championship – Most Valuable Player	2024	
World U18 Championship – Best Defender	2024, 2025	
World U18 Championship – Media All-Star Team	2024, 2025	
