= Emilia Kyrkkö =

Finnish ice hockey player (born 2004)

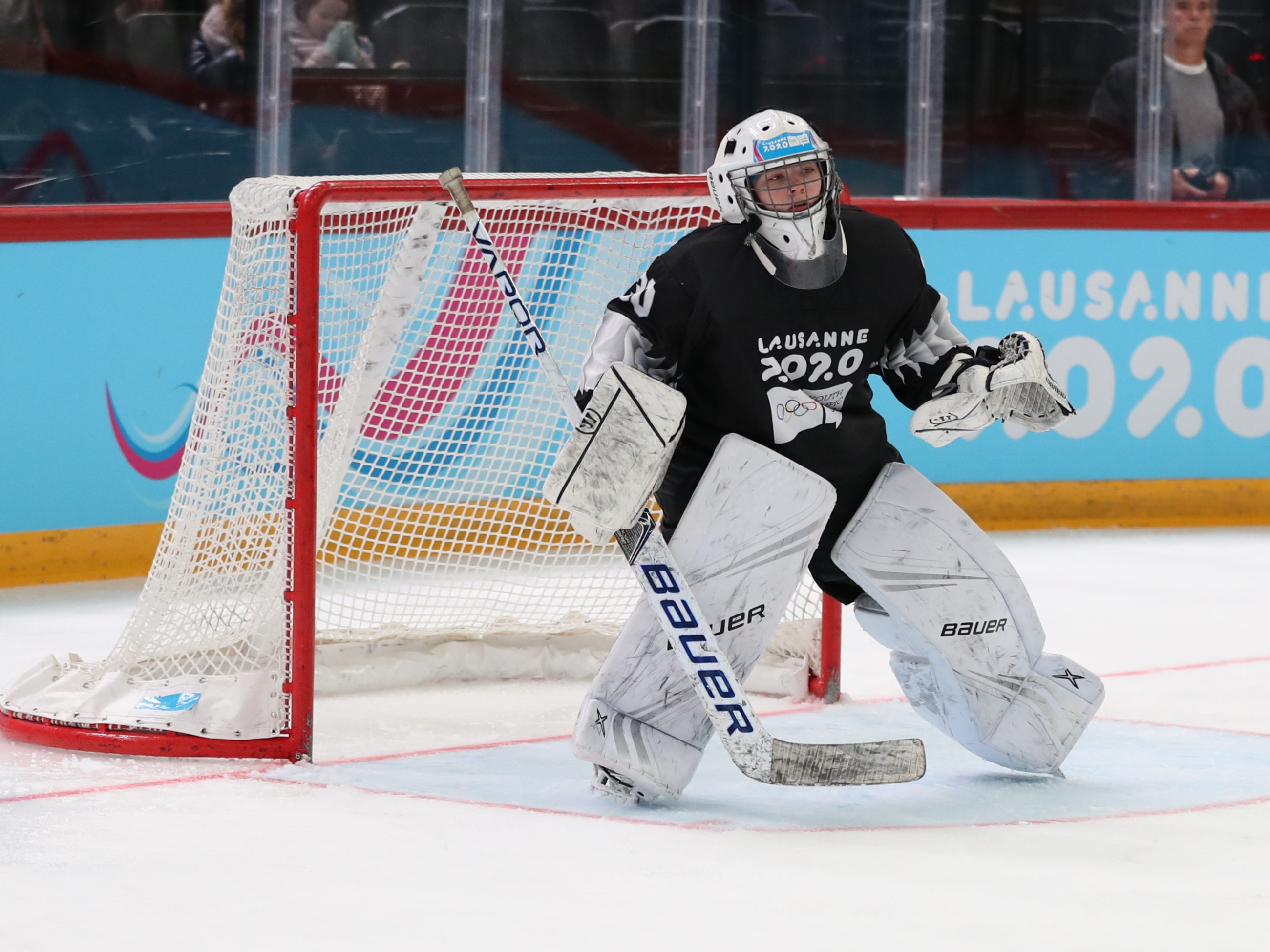
- Kyrkkö with Team Black at the 2020 Winter Youth Olympics
- Born: 24 February 2004 (age 22) Nokia, Finland
- Height: 169 cm (5 ft 7 in)
- Weight: 68 kg (150 lb; 10 st 10 lb)
- Position: Goaltender
- Catches: Left
- WCHA team Former teams: St. Cloud State Huskies; Team Kuortane
- National team: Finland
- Playing career: 2020–present
Medal record
World Championship
Bronze medal – third place	2025 Czechia

Emilia Kyrkkö (born 24 February 2004) is a Finnish college ice hockey goaltender for St. Cloud and a member of the Finnish national team.

== Playing career ==
Kyrkkö began playing ringette as a child in Nokia. At age nine or ten, she joined the youth department of NoU Ringette, the ringette side of the multi-sport club Nokian Urheilijat (NoU). In the 2015–16 season with NoU under-16 (U16), she played as a skater and was the youngest player on the team but she had fully switched to goaltending by the following season, which she played with NoU U14. She continued playing ringette as a net minder with various youth teams of NoU and BLD Ringette, ultimately playing seven seasons of the sport.

=== Youth ===
Around age eleven, Sanni Vanhanen invited her to practice with the boys' ice hockey team Vanhanen played on in the youth department of HC Nokia and Kyrkkö decided to join as the only other girl on the team. HC Nokia youth teams played in two or more skill levels (AAA, AA, A, etc.; see minor ice hockey) of an age class and each team's players would be rotated through the various levels on a week-by-week basis while continuing to practice as a single unit. This system gave Kyrkkö the opportunity to tend goal at three skill levels in the E1 (U12) leagues and two skill levels in the D2 (U13) leagues during 2016–17 season.

=== Naisten Liiga ===
Ahead of the 2020–21 season, Kyrkkö joined Team Kuortane, the national women's development program of the Finnish Ice Hockey Association. Members of the team attend and live at the Kuortaneen urheilulukio, where they balance studies with 20–25 hours per week of training in addition to playing in the Naisten Liiga, the elite women's national league in Finland.

=== NCAA ===
In March 2023, Mira Jalosuo, an assistant coach with the St. Cloud State Huskies women's ice hockey program and former Finnish national team player, indicated Kyrkkö had committed to play college ice hockey at St. Cloud State University as an incoming freshman for the 2024–25 season.

== International play ==
Kyrkkö served as the flag bearer for Finland in the opening ceremony of the 2020 Winter Youth Olympics in Lausanne. She participated in the 3x3 mixed NOC tournament as the only female ice hockey player representing Finland at the 2020 Winter Youth Olympics. With Team Black, a mixed National Olympic Committee (NOC) team of thirteen players from thirteen nations, she won a silver medal in the tournament.

As a junior ice hockey player with the Finnish national under-18 team, Kyrkkö participated in the 2022 IIHF U18 Women's World Championship. She played in four of Finland's five games, securing two shutouts in that span, and recorded a cumulative save percentage of 95.86, the best save percentage of all tournament goaltenders playing more than forty percent of their team's minutes. Her excellent performance helped Finland claim a bronze medal victory and Kyrkkö was selected Best Goaltender by the tournament directorate and named to the Media All Star team.

The following year, Kyrkkö was named to Finland's senior national team for the 2023 IIHF Women's World Championship as the third goaltender behind Anni Keisala and Sanni Ahola. She did not play in any games during the tournament.

On 2 January 2026, she was named to Finland's roster to compete at the 2026 Winter Olympics.

== Personal life ==
Kyrkkö was born on 24 February 2004 in Nokia, Finland. She grew up in Mutala, a village in the Ylöjärvi municipality of Finland's landlocked south-eastern Pirkanmaa region, as the second-eldest of six siblings. Her younger brother, Julius (born 2005), was her teammate during the seasons she played in the youth department of HC Nokia.

Kyrkkö's elder brother, Hugo (born 2003), has played as a defenseman with the under-20 team of Lempäälän Kisa since 2021. Her younger sister, Fanny (born 2011), also a defenseman, made her junior national team debut at the 2025 IIHF U18 Women's World Championship.

Away from ice hockey, she enjoys video gaming and frisbee golf.

== Career statistics ==
=== Regular season and playoffs ===
			Regular season									Playoffs
Season	Team	League	GP	W	L	T	Min	GA	SV%	GAA	SO	GP	W	L	Min	GA	SV%	GAA	SO
2020-21	Kuortane	NSML	13	5	7	–	749:22	30	.934	2.40	1	2	0	1	74:56	5	.928	4.00	0
2021-22	Kuortane	NSML	16	4	10	–	942:23	62	.904	3.95	0	–	–	–	–	–	–	–	–
2022-23	Kuortane	NSML	24	9	12	–	1430:18	56	.925	2.35	3	4	1	3	248:00	12	.937	2.90	0
2023-24	Kuortane	NSML	6	2	3	–	302:25	14	.909	2.78	0	3	0	3	194:55	7	.907	2.15	0
2024-25	SCSU Huskies	WCHA	18	7	7	3	1060:00	35	.926	1.98	3	–	–	–	–	–	–	–	–
Naisten Liiga totals			53	18	29	–	3122:03	148			4	6	1	4	322:56	17	.934	3.16	0

=== International ===
Year	Team	Event	Result	GP	W	L	MIN	GA	SV%	GAA	SO
2020	Team Black	YOG	2nd place, silver medalist(s)
2022	Finland U18	WC18	3rd place, bronze medalist(s)	4	2	2	238:44	6	.959	1.51	2
2023	Finland	WC	5th	0	–	–	0:00	–	–	–	–
2025	Finland	WC	3rd place, bronze medalist(s)	3	1	2	140:18	13	.827	5.56	0
2026	Finland	OG	6th	0	–	–	0:00	–	–	–	–

== Awards and honors ==
Award	Year
International
World U18 Bronze Medal	2022
World U18 Best Goaltender	2022
World U18 All-Star Team	2022
World U18 Top-3 Player on Team	2022
World Championship Bronze Medal	2025
College
All-WCHA, Rookie Team	2024–25
Naisten Liiga
Player of the Month	September 2022
Tuula Puputti Award	2022–23
All-Star, First Team	2022–23
