= Ella Huber =

American ice hockey player (born 2002)

- Born: December 18, 2002 (age 23) Northfield, Illinois, U.S.
- Height: 5 ft 5 in (165 cm)
- Weight: 141 lb (64 kg; 10 st 1 lb)
- Position: Forward
- Shoots: Left
- PWHL team: Boston Fleet
- Playing career: 2021–present
Medal record
World U18 Championship
Gold medal – first place	2020 Slovakia

Ella Huber (born December 18, 2002) is an American professional ice hockey player for the Boston Fleet of the Professional Women's Hockey League (PWHL). She played college ice hockey at Minnesota.

== Early life ==
Huber attended New Trier High School in Northfield, Illinois. She also played ice hockey for the Chicago Mission, where she won five state championships, four regional championships, and one national championship.

== Playing career ==
=== College ===
Huber began her collegiate career for Minnesota during the 2021–22 season. She made her collegiate debut on October 1, 2021, in a game against Ohio State and scored her first career goal a week later in a game against Minnesota Duluth. During her freshman year, she recorded nine goals and 12 assists in 39 games. Following the season she was named to the WCHA All-Rookie team. During the 2022–23 season, in her sophomore year, she recorded ten goals and 19 assists in 37 games. She ranked sixth on the team in scoring with 29 points.

On September 22, 2023, Huber was named captain for the 2023–24 season. During her junior year, she recorded 18 goals and 24 assists in 39 games. She ranked third on the team in scoring with 42 points. On March 1, 2024, during the first round of the 2024 WCHA tournament against Minnesota State, Huber recorded her first career hat-trick.

On September 20, 2024, Huber was named co-captain for the 2024–25 season. During her senior year, she recorded 15 goals and 33 assists in 42 games. She ranked second on the team in scoring with a career-high 48 points, and led the team, and tied for sixth in the nation in assists. On November 2, 2024, in a game against Bemidji State, she scored her 100th career point. On February 28, 2025, in a game against Minnesota State, she scored her 50th career goal. She finished her collegiate career with 52 goals and 88 assists in 157 games.

=== Professional ===
On June 24, 2025, Huber was drafted in the second round, tenth overall, by the Boston Fleet in the 2025 PWHL Draft. On August 13, 2025, she signed a two-year contract with the Fleet. During the 2025–26 season, in her rookie year, she recorded four goals and two assists in 30 regular season games and two assists in four games during the 2026 Walter Cup playoffs.

On June 15, 2026, Huber signed a one-year contract with PWHL Detroit as part of the Expansion Player Distribution Process. However, the next day she was traded back to the Fleet, along with Detroit's third-round pick (27th overall), in exchange for the Fleet's second-round (22nd overall) and third-round (34th overall) pick in the 2026 PWHL Draft.

== International play ==
On November 1, 2019, Huber was selected to represent the United States at the 2020 IIHF World Women's U18 Championship. During the tournament she recorded one goal in five games and won a gold medal.

== Personal life ==
Huber was born to John and Margie Huber, and has six siblings, John, Brock, Mary, Hans, Ingrid and Theresa. Huber is dating professional ice hockey player Matthew Knies.

== Career statistics ==
=== Regular season and playoffs ===
Note: GP = Games played; G = Goals; A = Assists; Pts = Points; PIM = Penalty minutes;

			Regular season					Playoffs
Season	Team	League	GP	G	A	Pts	PIM	GP	G	A	Pts	PIM
2021–22	Minnesota Golden Gophers	WCHA	39	9	12	21	14	—	—	—	—	—
2022–23	Minnesota Golden Gophers	WCHA	37	10	19	29	20	—	—	—	—	—
2023–24	Minnesota Golden Gophers	WCHA	39	18	24	42	30	—	—	—	—	—
2024–25	Minnesota Golden Gophers	WCHA	42	15	33	48	24	—	—	—	—	—
2025–26	Boston Fleet	PWHL	30	4	2	6	12	4	0	2	2	0
PWHL totals			30	4	2	6	12	4	0	2	2	0

=== International ===
Note: GP = Games played; G = Goals; A = Assists; Pts = Points; PIM = Penalty minutes;

				Regular season
Year	Team	Event	Result	GP	G	A	Pts	PIM
2020	United States	U18	1st place, gold medalist(s)	5	1	0	1	2
Junior totals				5	1	0	1	2
