= Joy Dunne =

American ice hockey player (born 2005)

- Born: June 13, 2005 (age 21) St. Louis, Missouri, US
- Height: 5 ft 11 in (180 cm)
- Position: Forward
- Shoots: Left
- NCAA team: Ohio State University
- National team: United States

Joy Virginia Dunne (born June 13, 2005) is an American college ice hockey player who is a forward for Ohio State University and the United States national team.

With the United States, she was part of the 2026 U.S. Olympic women's hockey team that won the gold medal. She has also won gold (2025, 2026) and silver (2024) at the World Championships. In 2024, she was named the National Rookie of the Year.

== Early life ==
Born in O'Fallon, Missouri, Joy is the daughter of Tammy and Tom Dunne and is the youngest of six siblings. All six Dunne children—Jessica, Jincy, Josh, Josey, James, and Joy—play hockey at elite levels.

External videos
- The Dunnes create hockey family dynasty in O'Fallon, MO, 5 On Your Side

Dunne played both boys' and girls' youth hockey for the St. Louis 'AAA' Blues and the St. Louis Lady Blues for 13 years. She attended The Fulton School and Fort Zumwalt South High School.

== Playing career ==
As her sisters Jincy and Jessica did before her, Joy attended and played for Ohio State University. Her first collegiate goal came on November 3, 2023, recording a hat-trick against Bemidji State University. Dunne finished her rookie season with 42 points in 39 games and led the Buckeyes with 24 goals, including the game-winning goal in the finals of the national championship that propelled Ohio State to their second national title in three years. She was named WCHA Rookie of the Year and National Rookie of the Year, as well as to the NCAA All-Tournament team.

== International play ==
Medal record

Representing United States

Women's ice hockey

Olympic Games
| Gold medal – first place | 2026 Milano Cortina | Team |

World Championships
| Gold medal – first place | 2025 Czechia | |
| Gold medal – first place | 2026 Denmark | |
| Silver medal – second place | 2024 United States | |

World U18 Championships
| Bronze medal – third place | 2023 Sweden | |

=== Junior ===
Captaining Team USA at the 2023 IIHF World Women's U18 Championship, Dunne scored six points in five games en route to a bronze medal.

=== Senior ===
Dunne made her senior level international debut for the United States at the 2024 IIHF Women's World Championship where she scored one goal and one assist in seven games and won a silver medal. She returned for the 2025 IIHF Women's World Championship, where the Americans defeated Canada 4–3 in overtime to win the gold medal, their first world championship since 2023.

On January 2, 2026, Dunne was named to Team USA's roster to compete at the 2026 Winter Olympics. She was Team USA's youngest player. Making her Olympic debut in a 5–1 win versus Czechia, Dunne logged 11:06 of ice time and scored her first Olympic goal, with the assist credited to Tessa Janecke.

== Personal life ==
Joy is the youngest of six siblings, all ice hockey players. Her sister Jincy plays for the Minnesota Frost of the Professional Women's Hockey League (PWHL), and her brother Josh plays in the National Hockey League (NHL) for the Buffalo Sabres.

== Career statistics ==
=== Regular season and playoffs ===
| | | | Regular season | | | | | Playoffs |
| Season | Team | League | GP | G | A | Pts | PIM | GP | G | A | Pts | PIM |
|---|---|---|---|---|---|---|---|---|---|---|---|---|
| 2023–24 | Ohio State University | WCHA | 39 | 24 | 18 | 42 | 22 | — | — | — | — | — |
| 2024–25 | Ohio State University | WCHA | 40 | 29 | 33 | 62 | 55 | — | — | — | — | — |
| 2025–26 | Ohio State University | WCHA | 31 | 27 | 24 | 51 | 31 | — | — | — | — | — |
| NCAA totals | | | 110 | 80 | 75 | 155 | 108 | — | — | — | — | — |

=== International ===
| Year | Team | Event | Result | GP | G | A | Pts | PIM |
|---|---|---|---|---|---|---|---|---|
| 2023 | United States | U18 | 3rd place, bronze medalist(s) | 5 | 3 | 3 | 6 | 6 |
| 2024 | United States | WC | 2nd place, silver medalist(s) | 7 | 1 | 1 | 2 | 2 |
| 2025 | United States | WC | 1st place, gold medalist(s) | 6 | 0 | 1 | 1 | 2 |
| 2026 | United States | OG | 1st place, gold medalist(s) | 7 | 2 | 3 | 5 | 2 |
| Junior totals | | | | 5 | 3 | 3 | 6 | 6 |
| Senior totals | | | | 20 | 3 | 5 | 8 | 6 |

== Awards and honors ==
| Honors | Year | Ref |
College
| Third Team All-WCHA | 2024 | |
| WCHA All-Rookie Team | 2024 | |
| National Rookie of the Year | 2024 | |
| WCHA Rookie of the Year | 2024 | |
| NCAA All-Tournament Team | 2024 | |
