= Abbey Murphy =

American ice hockey player (born 2002)

- Born: April 14, 2002 (age 24) Evergreen Park, Illinois, United States
- Height: 165 cm (5 ft 5 in)
- Position: Forward
- Shoots: Right
- PWHL team: Seattle Torrent
- National team: United States
- Playing career: 2020–present

Abigail Murphy (born April 14, 2002) is an American professional ice hockey player for the Seattle Torrent of the Professional Women's Hockey League (PWHL). She was previously the captain for the University of Minnesota of the National Collegiate Athletic Association (NCAA).

As a member of the United States women's national ice hockey team, Murphy is a two-time World Championship gold medalist (2023, 2025), 2022 Olympic silver medalist and 2026 Olympic gold medalist. At the 2023 IIHF Women's World Championship, Murphy set the tournament record for fastest goal in history, scoring seven seconds into a game against Switzerland.

In college hockey, she ranks among Minnesota's all-time leaders in goals and holds the program record for most career game-winning goals. In January 2026, she produced a widely acclaimed assist against Minnesota State that went viral, batting a bouncing puck through a defender's legs at full speed before feeding her teammate for a goal. Murphy was selected second overall in the 2026 PWHL Draft by the Seattle Torrent.

== Early life ==
Murphy was born in Evergreen Park, Illinois, to Lynne (née DiGrazia) and Edward Murphy. Her mother played college softball and her two older brothers, Patrick and Dominic, also competed in college athletics. She was the first member of her family to play ice hockey.

Murphy began playing hockey at the age of seven after watching her neighbor, Tom Pratl, play the sport in his backyard. She asked her parents to buy her roller blades, and Pratl taught her how to skate. Her earliest hockey memories include skating with boys at the local rink and being forced to push puck buckets around the ice until she learned to skate properly. She first joined the St. Jude Knights Hockey Club in Crestwood, Illinois, where she was one of just a handful of girls on the team. At age 10, she joined the Chicago Mission, a USA Hockey Tier I AAA program in Woodridge, Illinois. With the Mission, she won a state championship at the 14U level and both state and national championships at the 16U level. Murphy often practiced with older teams and her father would bring her to the rink and stay as long as she wanted. Murphy played for the Chicago Mission for about seven or eight years.

Murphy attended Mother McAuley Liberal Arts High School in Chicago, graduating in 2020. A multi-sport athlete, she also played baseball, softball, lacrosse, volleyball, and basketball growing up. In October 2025, Murphy was inducted into the Mother McAuley Hall of Honor, an award celebrating members of the school community who have distinguished themselves through achievement or service.

== Playing career ==
=== College ===
Murphy began her college ice hockey career at the University of Minnesota in 2020, playing for the Gophers. In her freshman season, Murphy appeared in all 20 games and recorded eight goals and 10 assists for 18 points, ranking second on the team in both categories. She made her collegiate debut in a 4–0 victory over Ohio State on November 21, 2020, and scored her first college goal in a 4–2 win at Minnesota Duluth on November 27, 2020. Her performance earned her WCHA All-Rookie Team honors and she was twice named WCHA Rookie of the Week.

Returning to Minnesota for the 2022–23 season, Murphy recorded 29 goals and 21 assists for 50 points in 39 games. She scored a hat trick against St. Cloud State on November 22, 2022, and recorded eight points with three goals and five assists in a sweep of St. Thomas. On January 3, 2023, she tallied three points with a goal and two assists against Brown. Murphy also scored back-to-back game-winning goals in the 2023 WCHA Final Faceoff on March 3–4.

In the 2023–24 season, Murphy recorded 62 points in 39 games, the third-best total in the NCAA, and tied for first in goal scoring with 33. She led the nation in game-winning goals with seven and in shots with 242. Murphy became a top-10 finalist for the Patty Kazmaier Award. On October 13, 2023, she recorded a career-high five points with a hat trick and two assists in an 8–0 victory over St. Thomas at the Xcel Energy Center. She was named the WCHA Forward of the Month in November 2023 after scoring six goals and eight points in the month. She earned her second consecutive WCHA Forward of the Month Award after she finished the month with six goals, four assists and 10 points to lead the league in scoring during December. On March 7, 2024, Murphy scored her 100th career goal in the WCHA Final Faceoff Semifinal against Ohio State.

External videos
- The fellas were in disbelief watching Minnesota’s Abbey Murphy hit the Shammgod nutmeg assist, TNT Sports

Murphy announced in May 2025 that she would return to Minnesota for a fifth season, utilizing her COVID-19 eligibility exemption from the 2020–21 season and her redshirt year from 2021 to 2022. She was named team captain for the 2024–25 season. On January 10, 2026, Murphy produced a widely acclaimed assist against Minnesota State, batting a bouncing puck through a defender's legs at full speed before feeding freshman Bella Fanale for a goal. The play was called "the greatest assist of all time" by hockey analyst John Buccigross and went viral across social media.

=== Professional ===
On June 17, 2026, Murphy was selected second overall by the Seattle Torrent in the 2026 PWHL Draft. On June 29, 2026, it was announced that Murphy, along with Chloe Primerano and Caitlin Kraemer, would be attending the development camp of the National Hockey League's Edmonton Oilers alongside the team's prospects and other camp invites.

== International play ==
Medal record

Representing United States

Ice hockey

Olympic Games
Gold medal – first place	2026 Milano Cortina	Team
Silver medal – second place	2022 Beijing	Team

World Championships
Gold medal – first place	2023 Canada	
Gold medal – first place	2025 Czechia	
Gold medal – first place	2026 Denmark	
Silver medal – second place	2021 Canada	
Silver medal – second place	2024 United States	

World U18 Championships
Gold medal – first place	2018 Russia	
Gold medal – first place	2020 Slovakia	
Silver medal – second place	2019 Japan	

Murphy has represented the United States at both the youth and senior national team levels.

=== Junior ===
Murphy represented the United States at the 2018, 2019, and 2020 IIHF World Women's U18 Championships, scoring a total of 13 points in 15 games and winning gold twice and silver once. At the 2020 event, she became the second player in history to score a goal in three consecutive World U18 Championship gold medal games, after Kendall Coyne Schofield.

=== Senior ===
==== World Championships ====
Murphy made her senior debut for the United States at the 2021 IIHF Women's World Championship, earning a silver medal. At the 2023 IIHF Women's World Championship in Brampton, Ontario, Murphy set a tournament record by scoring just seven seconds into the United States' 9–1 victory over Switzerland on April 7, 2023. The goal broke the previous record of 13 seconds set in 1994. After Abby Roque won the opening faceoff, Murphy sped past two Swiss defenders and fired a shot past goaltender Saskia Maurer. The United States won the gold medal.

At the 2024 IIHF Women's World Championship in Utica, New York, Murphy recorded three goals and five assists for eight points over seven games as the United States earned the silver medal. She scored a goal and added an assist in a 5–3 victory over Finland in group play on April 6. In the quarterfinals on April 11, Murphy scored two goals in a 10–0 victory over Japan.

Murphy helped the United States win the gold medal at the 2025 IIHF Women's World Championship in České Budějovice, Czech Republic, defeating defending champion Canada 4–3 in overtime (the longest overtime game in tournament history). On April 11, 2025, Murphy scored two goals in the United States' 4–0 victory over host Czechia before a sellout crowd of 5,859 at Budvar Arena. Murphy opened the scoring with a power-play one-timer from the left circle with 5:02 remaining in the first period, and added her second goal at 6:58 of the second period by collecting her own rebound. The tournament set an all-time attendance record with 122,331 fans over 12 days.

==== Olympics ====
External videos
- Abbey Murphy: 2022 Olympic Introduction, USA Hockey

On January 2, 2022, Murphy was named to Team USA's roster to represent the United States at the 2022 Winter Olympics. At age 19, she was the youngest forward on the U.S. team. Murphy recorded one assist in seven games as the United States won the silver medal.

On January 2, 2026, Murphy was named to Team USA's roster to compete at the 2026 Winter Olympics. On February 10, Abbey Murphy had three assists in a 5-0 win versus Canada, marking the first time that Canada have been shutout in women's ice hockey at the Olympic Games.

==== Rivalry Series ====
External videos
- The U.S. tops Canada 4-1 in game one of the Rivalry Series, USA Hockey

Murphy competed in the 2025–26 Rivalry Series against Canada in November and December 2025, recording five goals and eight points across four games as the United States swept the series 4–0. On November 6, 2025, she scored a hat trick in a 4–1 victory in Cleveland, with all three goals assisted by Taylor Heise. It was the first hat trick by an American against Canada since Hilary Knight in the 2023 World Championship gold medal game. On December 11, 2025, Murphy recorded two goals in a 10–4 victory over Canada in Edmonton, Alberta, marking the first time the Canadian women's national ice hockey team allowed 10 goals in a loss to the United States.

== Career statistics ==
=== Regular season and playoffs ===
			Regular season					Playoffs
Season	Team	League	GP	G	A	Pts	PIM	GP	G	A	Pts	PIM
2020–21	University of Minnesota	WCHA	20	8	10	18	26	—	—	—	—	—
2022–23	University of Minnesota	WCHA	38	29	21	50	59	—	—	—	—	—
2023–24	University of Minnesota	WCHA	39	33	29	62	118	—	—	—	—	—
2024–25	University of Minnesota	WCHA	42	33	32	65	87	—	—	—	—	—
NCAA totals			139	103	62	195	290	—	—	—	—	—

=== International ===
Year	Team	Event	Result	GP	G	A	Pts	PIM
2018	United States	U18	1st place, gold medalist(s)	5	4	2	6	2
2019	United States	U18	2nd place, silver medalist(s)	5	4	1	5	8
2020	United States	U18	1st place, gold medalist(s)	5	2	0	2	2
2021	United States	WC	2nd place, silver medalist(s)	6	2	0	2	6
2022	United States	OG	2nd place, silver medalist(s)	7	0	1	1	8
2023	United States	WC	1st place, gold medalist(s)	7	5	3	8	31
2024	United States	WC	2nd place, silver medalist(s)	7	3	5	8	4
2025	United States	WC	1st place, gold medalist(s)	7	3	3	6	6
2026	United States	OG	1st place, gold medalist(s)	7	2	5	7	6
Junior totals				15	10	3	13	12
Senior totals				41	15	17	32	60

== Awards and honors ==
Honors	Year	Ref
College
WCHA All-Rookie team	2021	
WCHA All-Tournament Team	2023	
All-WCHA third team	2023	
All-WCHA second team	2024	
