= Emma Peschel =

American ice hockey player (born 2004)

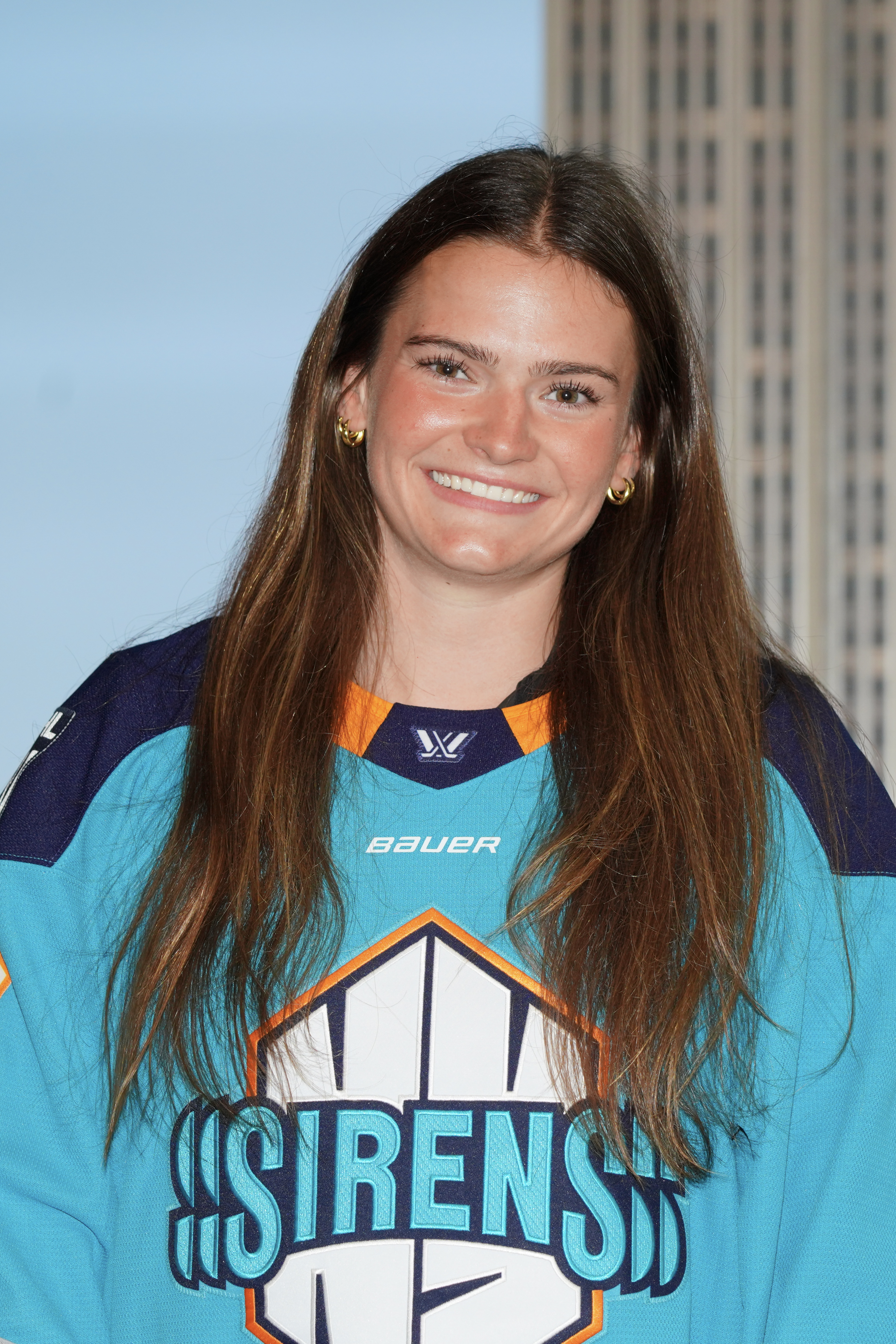
- Peschel in 2026
- Born: January 20, 2004 (age 22) Edina, Minnesota, U.S.
- Height: 5 ft 10 in (178 cm)
- Position: Defense
- Shoots: Left
- PWHL team: New York Sirens
- National team: United States
- Playing career: 2026–present
Medal record
World Championships
Gold medal – first place	2026 Denmark
World U18 Championship
Silver medal – second place	2022 United States

Emma Peschel (born January 20, 2004) is an American professional ice hockey defenseman for the New York Sirens of the Professional Women’s Hockey League (PWHL). She previously played for Ohio State at the collegiate level.

== Early life ==
Peschel was born to Gina and Pat Peschel and has two siblings, Will and Jack. She attended Benilde-St. Margaret's in St. Louis Park, Minnesota, where she played ice hockey for four years, and lacrosse for three years.

== Playing career ==
=== Collegiate ===
Peschel began her college ice hockey career for Ohio State during the 2022–23 season. During her freshman year she appeared in all 41 games and recorded six goals and six assists. During the 2023–24 season, in her sophomore year, she recorded seven goals and 16 assists in 36 games. She helped lead the Buckeyes to their second NCAA women's ice hockey tournament championship in 2024.

During the 2024–25 season, in her junior year, she recorded eight goals and 26 assists in 40 games and was named to the All-WCHA first team. Following the season she was named a CCM/AHCA Second Team All-American.

During the 2025–26 season, in her senior year, she recorded a career-high ten goals and 29 assists in 34 games and was named to the All-WCHA first team. During February 2026, she led all defenders in scoring with three goals and nine assists and was named the Hockey Commissioners Association (HCA) Defender of the Month. She was tied for second nationally among defenders in points with 39. Following the season she was named a CCM/AHCA First Team All-American. During the championship game of the 2026 NCAA Division I women's ice hockey tournament against Wisconsin she assisted on the game-tying goal. She was subsequently named to the NCAA All-Tournament team.

=== Professional ===
On June 17, 2026, Peschel was selected seventh overall in the 2026 PWHL draft by the New York Sirens.

== International play ==
Peschel represented the United States at the 2022 IIHF World Women's U18 Championship where she was scoreless in five games and won a silver medal.

She made her senior national team debut at the 2025 Rivalry Series and has been named to the roster for the upcoming 2026 IIHF Women's World Championships.

== Career statistics ==
=== Regular season and playoffs ===
			Regular season					Playoffs
Season	Team	League	GP	G	A	Pts	PIM	GP	G	A	Pts	PIM
2022–23	Ohio State University	WCHA	41	6	6	12	4	—	—	—	—	—
2023–24	Ohio State University	WCHA	36	7	16	23	4	—	—	—	—	—
2024–25	Ohio State University	WCHA	40	8	26	34	45	—	—	—	—	—
2025–26	Ohio State University	WCHA	34	10	29	39	28	—	—	—	—	—
NCAA totals			151	31	77	108	81	—	—	—	—	—

=== International ===
Year	Team	Event	Result	GP	G	A	Pts	PIM
2022	United States	U18	2nd place, silver medalist(s)	5	0	0	0	4
Junior totals				5	0	0	0	4

== Awards and honors ==
Honors	Year	Ref
College
First Team All-WCHA	2025	
CCM/AHCA Second Team All-American	2025	
NCAA All-Tournament Team	2025	
First Team All-WCHA	2026	
CCM/AHCA First Team All-American	2026	
NCAA All-Tournament Team	2026	
