= Amanda Thiele =

American ice hockey player (born 2002)

- Born: July 30, 2002 (age 23) Milford, Michigan, U.S.
- Height: 5 ft 10 in (178 cm)
- Position: Goaltender
- Catches: Left
- PWHL team: Boston Fleet
- Playing career: 2025–present

Amanda Thiele (born July 30, 2002) is an American professional ice hockey goaltender for the Boston Fleet of the Professional Women's Hockey League (PWHL). She played college ice hockey for the Ohio State Buckeyes. Internationally, she won gold with the United States at the 2020 IIHF World Women's U18 Championship.

== Early life ==
Thiele grew up in Milford, Michigan, and attended Milford High School. She played youth hockey for Belle Tire and Little Caesars before enrolling at Ohio State.

== Playing career ==
=== College ===
Thiele appeared in 96 NCAA games over five seasons for Ohio State (2020–21 to 2024–25), posting a career 1.75 goals-against average (GAA), .913 save percentage (SV%), and 11 shutouts. As a sophomore in 2021–22 she went 18–3–0 with four shutouts and was named to the WCHA Final Faceoff All-Tournament Team as Ohio State won the tournament en route to the national title.

In 2022–23 she set an Ohio State single-season record with 20 wins (20–4–1) and recorded a 3–0 shutout of Northeastern in the NCAA Frozen Four semifinal.

As a graduate student in 2024–25 she went 20–7–2 across 29 games and became Ohio State’s all-time wins leader among goaltenders during the season.

=== Professional ===
On June 24, 2025, Thiele was selected in the sixth round, 42nd overall, by the Boston Fleet in the 2025 PWHL Draft. On November 20, 2025, she signed a one-year contract with the Fleet.

== International play ==
Medal record

Representing United States

Ice hockey

World U18 Championship
Gold medal – first place	2020 Slovakia	

Thiele represented the United States at the 2020 IIHF World Women's U18 Championship in Bratislava, Slovakia, winning a gold medal with Team USA.

== Career statistics ==
Goaltending
Season	Team	League	GP	W	L	T/OT	GAA	SV%	SO
2020–21	Ohio State	WCHA	3	2	0	0	0.90	.964	0
2021–22	Ohio State	WCHA	23	18	3	0	1.31	.939	4
2022–23	Ohio State	WCHA	26	20	4	1	1.81	.914	4
2023–24	Ohio State	WCHA	15	13	2	0	1.63	.905	2
2024–25	Ohio State	WCHA	29	20	7	2	2.21	.887	1
NCAA totals			96	73	16	3	1.75	.913	11

== Awards and honors ==
Honor	Year	Ref
College
WCHA Final Faceoff All-Tournament Team	2022	
