= 2023 Aurora Borealis Cup playoffs =

Finnish Championship ice hockey tournament

Naisten Liiga pudotuspelit 2023 (Finnish) 2022 Naisten Liiga playoffs

Tournament details
- Venues: 9 (in 8 host cities)
- Dates: 25 February 2023–21 March 2023
- Format: Best-of-five
- Teams: 8
- Defending champions: Kiekko-Espoo

Final positions
- Champions: IFK Helsinki (1st title)
- Runners-up: Kiekko-Espoo
- Third place: KalPa Kuopio
- Fourth place: HPK Hämeenlinna

Tournament statistics
- Scoring leader(s): Michaela Pejzlová, HIFK (24 points)

Awards
- MVP: Sanni Vanhanen, HIFK

The 2023 Aurora Borealis Cup playoffs or the 2023 Naisten Liiga playoffs (Finnish: Naisten Liiga pudotuspelit 2023) is the postseason tournament of the 2022–23 season of the Naisten Liiga. The tournament began on 25 February and IFK Helsinki (HIFK) were awarded the Aurora Borealis Cup on 21 March 2023.

Entering the playoffs, Kiekko-Espoo were the reigning Aurora Borealis Cup champions after winning the 2022 Naisten Liiga playoffs. At the conclusion of the 2022–23 regular season, HIFK and KalPa were favorites for the 2023 Aurora Borealis Cup finals.

== Bracket ==
Quarterfinals
1	IFK Helsinki	12	8	6	/	3
8	Kärpät Oulu	0	0	0	/	0
4	HPK Hämeenlinna	5	1	5	4	3
5	Ilves Tampere	0	5	3	2	1
2	KalPa Kuopio	4	5	4	/	3
7	TPS Turku	1	4	3	/	0
3	Kiekko-Espoo	3	2	4	3	3
6	Team Kuortane	4	1	3	0	1

Semifinals
1	IFK Helsinki	2	6	6	/	3
4	HPK Hämeenlinna	0	1	2	/	0
2	KalPa Kuopio	2	3	1	0	1
3	Kiekko-Espoo	3	2	2	2	3

Finals
1st place, gold medalist(s)	IFK Helsinki	9	4	3	3
2nd place, silver medalist(s)	Kiekko-Espoo	2	0	2	0
Bronze medal game
3rd place, bronze medalist(s)	KalPa Kuopio	3
4	HPK Hämeenlinna	1

Source: Suomen Jääkiekkoliitto

== Quarterfinals ==
The best-of-five quarterfinals (Finnish: puolivälierät) began on Saturday, 25 February and concluded on Saturday, 4 March. The top eight teams from the regular season qualified for the quarterfinal round. Games for three of the four series were scheduled to be played on 25 and 26 February, and 1, 4, and 5 March, with home ice advantage granted to the higher seeded teams for the first, third, and potential fifth games. The IFK Helsinki versus Kärpät Oulu series was scheduled to be played on 25 and 26 February, and 1, 2, and 5 March with home ice advantage granted to HIFK for the first, second, and potential fifth game.

=== (1) HIFK vs. (8) Kärpät ===
IFK Helsinki claimed the first seed, even though they tied KalPa Kuopio with 93 points, by virtue of a higher goal difference, marking the first regular season victory in team history. Led by Michaela Pejzlová, who was the regular season top point scorer with 82 points, HIFK was an offensive powerhouse; four HIFK players finished the season ranked in the league top-ten for scoring: Pejzlová, Julia Liikala (66 points), Emilia Vesa (53 points), and Clara Rozier (49 points). The team also benefitted from excellent goaltending, as starting netminder Kiia Lahtinen's 1.33 goals against average (GAA) ranked first of all goaltenders playing at least one-third of their team's minutes and her 93.6 save percentage (S-%) placed second of all starters in the league.

Oulun Kärpät struggled in the regular season, winning just seven games in regulation time and amassing a disappointing 28 points on the season to earn the eighth seed. Their totals represented a sharp decline from the previous season, in which they had claimed sixteen regulation wins and collected 52 points. Oona Havana led the team in scoring for the second consecutive season and ranked eighteenth in the league overall with 36 points in 36 games played; Havana was supported by the production of Emma Ekoluoma, who ranked 41st in the league with 24 points, and Tilli Keränen, who ranked 46th in the league with 22 points. After the 1A of Kärpät's goaltending tandem, Johanna Oksman, opted not to play in the 2022–23 season, goaltender Kati Asikainen was left with the most substantial game load in the league – she played in 29 games during the season. The increased time in net was taxing and Asikainen posted middling statistics, with an 89.4 S-% and 3.65 GAA.

HIFK and Kärpät faced one another four times during the 2022–23 season, all four games resulting in decisive victories for HIFK.

The teams last met in the postseason during the semifinals of the 2022 Aurora Borealis Cup playoffs, which HIFK won in three games.

All times local, Eastern European Time (UTC+02:00)

25 February 2023; 14:30	IFK Helsinki	12 – 0 (3–0, 5–0, 4–0)	Kärpät Oulu	Pirkkolan jäähalli, Helsinki; Attendance: 164

Kiia Lahtinen
Goalies
Kati Asikainen
Referee:
Henna Åberg
Linesmen:
Tomas Ramu
Santtu Semigin

Rantamäki (Vesa, Vanhanen) – 08:44	1–0
Vanhanen (Rantamäki, Saukkonen) – 13:04	2–0
Yrjölä (Rantamäki, Vesa) – 15:39	3–0
Rozier (Pejzlová) – 21:16	4–0
Vesa (Yrjölä, Pejzlová) (PP) – 26:59	5–0
Pejzlová (Locatelli) – 34:27	6–0
Vanhanen (Rantamäki, Vesa) – 36:18	7–0
Kemppainen (Korhonen) – 37:04	8–0
Vanhanen (Vesa, Saukkonen) – 44:21	9–0
Vesa (Yrjölä, Pejzlová) (PP) – 48:59	10–0
Liikala (Saukkonen, Locatelli) – 53:51	11–0
Mehtonen (Kitula, Kemppainen) – 54:44	12–0

2 min
Penalties
4 min
56
Shots
15

26 February 2023; 15:00	IFK Helsinki	8 – 0 (2–0, 4–0, 2–0)	Kärpät Oulu	Pirkkolan jäähalli, Helsinki; Attendance: 116

Iina Kuusela
Goalies
Kati Asikainen
Referee:
Reetta-Kaisa Lusi
Linesmen:
Salla-Maaria Raitala
Johanna Oksanen

Pejzlová (Liikala, Locatelli) – 08:35	1–0
Vanhanen (Vesa, Yrjölä) – 09:18	2–0
Rozier (Kemppainen) – 22:29	3–0
Rozier (Yrjölä, Pejzlová) – 30:11	4–0
Korhonen (Locatelli, Rozier) (PP) – 32:31	5–0
Pejzlová (Liikala) – 36:21	6–0
Yrjölä (Pejzlová, Liikala) – 51:28	7–0
Vesa (Vanhanen, Saukkonen) – 52:39	8–0

4 min
Penalties
4 min
52
Shots
21

1 March 2023; 18:15	Kärpät Oulu	0 – 6 (0–1, 0–3, 0–2)	IFK Helsinki	Raksila, Oulu; Attendance: 185

Kati Asikainen
Goalies
Kiia Lahtinen
Referee:
Johanna Tauriainen
Linesmen:
Juuso Herranen
Juhani Heikura

0–1	03:06 – Pejzlová (Rozier)
0–2	21:40 – Rantamäki (Vesa, Saukkonen)
0–3	29:13 – Pejzlová (Locatelli) (DP)
0–4	33:20 – Vanhanen (PS)
0–5	46:15 – Pejzlová (Vesa, Vihervuori)
0–6	56:38 – Liikala (Kylliäinen, Vanhanen) (EN)

16 min
Penalties
2 min
10
Shots
48

HIFK swept their quarterfinal series against Kärpät, scoring a total of 26 goals and holding Kärpät scoreless across all three games. Michaela Pejzlová led all players in scoring with eleven points (6+5), followed by Emilia Vesa (3+7) and Sanni Vanhanen (5+3). Ten HIFK players scored a goal in the series: Pejzlová (6), Vanhanen (5), Vesa (3), Clara Rozier (3), Julia Liikala (2), Karoliina Rantamäki (2), Siiri Yrjölä (2), Johanna Kemppainen (1), Erica Korhonen (1), and Nenna Mehtonen (1). Goaltender Kiia Lahtinen recorded two shutouts and backup netminder Iina Kuusela recorded one.

=== (2) KalPa vs. (7) TPS ===
KalPa Kuopio secured the second seed despite tying HIFK with 93 points due to a lower goal difference. They were propelled by the elite production of left winger Elisa Holopainen, the regular season goal scoring champion, who scored 41 goals and 34 assists (75 points) in 28 regular season games before an injury in late January ended her season prematurely and kept her out of the playoffs entirely. Other major contributors to KalPa’s scoring were Jenna Kaila, who tallied 28 goals and 31 assists (59 points), and 50-point earners Jenna Hietala (29+21) and Johanna Juutilainen (14+36). Goaltender Tiina Ranne was stalwart in net, posting the best save percentage of all goaltenders playing at least one-third of their team's minutes, at 93.8%, and the second-best goals against average, at 1.67, across twenty games.

TPS Turku claimed the seventh seed with 14 regulation wins and 49 total points in their fifth Naisten Liiga season. The team had nine players who scored twenty points or more, including centre Pauliina Salonen (23+17) and Czech winger Tereza Pištěková (14+26) who both ranked in the top twenty players for points. Notable blue liners included offensive-defenders Anni Timonen (6+16) and Emmi Mourujärvi (6+14), and team performance noticeably improved when French stay-at-home defender Raphaëlle Grenier, who was held to 19 games played due to injury, was in the lineup. Number one goaltender from the 2021–22 season Erica Jaskari was sidelined for the entire season and backup netminders Sari Saarinen and Tea Koljonen struggled with the added game load; both posted save percentages in the eighties and goals against average above 3.35 on the season.

KalPa swept all four matches in the season series with TPS, though their first meeting was pushed to the shootout before a goal from Liisa Kastikainen concluded the game in KalPa’s favor.

KalPa and TPS had never met in the playoffs prior to this series.

All times local, Eastern European Time (UTC+02:00)

25 February 2023; 12:30	KalPa Kuopio	4 – 1 (0–0, 2–1, 2–0)	TPS Turku	Niirala, Kuopio; Attendance: 89

Tiina Ranne
Goalies
Suvi Saarinen
Referee:
Sini Kauhanen
Linesmen:
Mikko Niskanen
Joonas Heinonen

	0–1	22:13 – Viitala (Keskisarja, Hotová)
Rantala (Jo. Juutilainen, Kaila) – 31:12	1–1
Rantanen (Kaila, Jo. Juutilainen) – 35:01	2–1
Hietala (Kastikainen, Rantala) – 54:57	3–1
Kaila (Jo. Juutilainen, Rantala) (EN) – 59:33	4–1

0 min
Penalties
2 min
28
Shots
16

26 February 2023; 14:30	TPS Turku	4 – 5 (1–4, 2–0, 1–1)	KalPa Kuopio	Kupittaa, Turku; Attendance: 60

Suvi Saarinen
Mila Houni
Goalies
Tiina Ranne
Referee:
Jenni Jaatinen
Linesmen:
Joni Kohomäki
Mari Vukelic

	0–1	06:32 – Jo. Juutilainen (Kaila, Rantanen) (DP)
	0–2	07:04 – Paroinen
	0–3	07:22 – Koljonen
Pištěková (Salonen) – 13:31	1–3
	1–4	19:40 – Hietala (Koljonen)
Allinen (Pištěková, Lukkarila) – 35:48	2–4
Mourujärvi (Allinen) (PP) – 38:17	3–4
	3–5	44:44 – Rantanen (Rantala, Kaila)
Grenier (Välikangas, Mourujärvi) – 53:45	4–5

6 min
Penalties
6 min
42
Shots
33

1 March 2023; 18:30	KalPa Kuopio	4 – 3 (1–0, 2–1, 1–2)	TPS Turku	Niirala, Kuopio; Attendance: 122

Tiina Ranne
Goalies
Tea Koljonen
Referee:
Sini Kauhanen
Linesmen:
Patrik Jokinen
Helinä Anttila

Kaila (Koljonen, Ad. Makkonen) (PP) – 09:50	1–0
	1–1	21:42 – Viitala (Pištěková, Välikangas)
Jo. Juutilainen (Mäkelä, Rantala) (PP) – 34:46	2–1
Hietala (Kortelainen) – 39:39	3–1
	3–2	41:33 – Udeh (Allinen)
Kortelainen (Jo. Juutilainen, Rantala) – 55:01	4–2
	4–3	57:04 – Timonen (Metsä-Tokila)

6 min
Penalties
6 min
31
Shots
30

KalPa won the series in three games. However, unlike the dramatically lopsided HIFK vs. Kärpät series, two of three games in this series ended with a goal difference of just one. In the first game, Susanna Viitala opened scoring on what would stand as TPS’ only goal of the match, as it was followed by four KalPa goals from Sanni Rantala, Salla Rantanen, Jenna Hietala, and Jenna Kaila; Johanna Juutilainen earned assists on three of the four goals. Scoring in the second match began with three goals on TPS goaltender Suvi Saarinen in under a minute, starting just after the six and half minute mark with a delayed penalty goal by Johanna Juutilainen and quickly followed by unassisted goals from Veera Paroinen and Tanja Koljonen; Saarinen was replaced in net by Mila Houni following Koljonen's goal. TPS managed to come within one goal of KalPa two times as the match went on, notching goals from Tereza Pištěková, Heli Allinen, Emmi Mourujärvi, and Raphaëlle Grenier, but KalPa held their lead with goals scored by Hietala and Rantanen. The series concluded on the most balanced game of the three – though TPS never held the lead, they kept the score at a tie for nearly fifteen minutes and played a majority of the game trailing KalPa by just one goal. TPS third goaltender Tanja Koljonen was selected to backstop the team and Viitala, Uche Udeh, and Anni Timonen lit the lamp for TPS. KalPa tallied two power play goals, scored by Kaila and Johanna Juutilainen, and two regular strength goals, by Hietala and Kaisla Kortelainen, to punch their ticket to the semifinals.

=== (3) K-Espoo vs. (6) Kuortane ===
Defending Aurora Borealis Cup champions Kiekko-Espoo ranked third in the regular season, ending the team’s reign as the top team in the regular season over the previous four seasons, due in large part to the dramatic number of player departures following the 2022 Finnish Championship, which included six of the previous season’s top-ten point scorers and team captain Minttu Tuominen. In their absence, several young players staged breakout seasons: Anni-Elina Montonen ranked tenth in the league with 21 goals and 21 assists for 42 points, Sofia Nuutinen ranked fifteenth with 25 assists and 39 points, and seventeen year old Julia Schalin tallied 17 goals and 30 points. Newly-appointed captain Emmi Rakkolainen was the team’s top performing centre, posting 38 points in 29 games played. Starting netminder Tiia Pajarinen, MVP of the 2021 Aurora Borealis Cup playoffs, ranked second for goals against average of all goaltenders playing at least one-third of their team's minutes, at 1.66 GAA, and fifth for save percentage, at 92.1%, across 21 games played.

Team Kuortane secured the sixth seed on account of their excellent goaltending. Despite being the lowest scoring team to qualify for the playoffs – they amassed just 91 goals on the season – Team Kuortane finished the season with a positive goal difference and won as many games as they lost (wins+OTW=18; losses+OTL=18). Emilia Kyrkkö played 24 games in net and faced nearly 700 shots while maintaining a 92.5 save percentage, good for fourth of all goaltenders playing at least one-third of their team's minutes, and 2.35 goals against average, which ranked sixth. Backup entminter Venla Varis played ten games and recorded a save percentage of 90.1%, 2.63 goals against average, and a shutout. Team Kuortane’s top scorers were Nea Tervonen (32 points), Sinna Varjonen (21 points), Neea Pelkonen (19 points), and Sofianna Sundelin, who scored 10 goals and 8 assists in just fourteen games played after injury kept her sidelined for much of the season.

Kiekko-Espoo and Team Kuortane faced one another four times during the 2022–23 regular season; Kiekko-Espoo won three of the four matches.

The teams last met in the 2021 Aurora Borealis Cup quarterfinals, which Kiekko-Espoo swept in two games.

All times local, Eastern European Time (UTC+02:00)

25 February 2023; 13:00	Kiekko-Espoo	3 – 4 (1–0, 2–3, 0–1)	Team Kuortane	Tapiola 2, Espoo; Attendance: 89

Minja Drufva
Goalies
Emilia Kyrkkö
Referee:
Jenni Jaatinen
Linesmen:
Ilona Silander
Salla-Maaria Raitala

Aro – 00:54	1–0
	1–1	23:08 – Sundelin (Tervonen)
Rakkolainen (Villilä, Schalin) (PP) – 28:46	2–1
	2–2	33:55 – Lehmus (Mustonen, Varjonen)
Täks (Holmström) – 35:32	3–2
	3–3	37:24 – Lehmus (Kari, Mustonen) (PP)
	3–4	46:05 – Sundelin (Pelkonen)

8 min
Penalties
10 min
40
Shots
29

26 February 2023; 15:00	Team Kuortane	1 – 2 OT (0–1, 1–0, 0–0) (OT: 0–1)	Kiekko-Espoo	Kuortaneen jäähalli, Kuortane; Attendance: 80

Emilia Kyrkkö
Goalies
Tiia Pajarinen
Referee:
Joonas Nurmi
Linesmen:
Joakim Rinta-Paavola
Lassi Mukkala

	0–1	10:09 – Talvitie (Vuosalmi, Nuutinen)
Sundelin – 22:00	1–1
	1–2	68:09 – Nuutinen (Aro, Haukijärvi)

4 min
Penalties
2 min
48
Shots
21

1 March 2023; 19:10	Kiekko-Espoo	4 – 3 OT (1–0, 0–1, 2–2) (OT: 1–0)	Team Kuortane	Tapiola 2, Espoo; Attendance: 152

Tiia Pajarinen
Goalies
Emilia Kyrkkö
Referee:
Akos Berger
Linesmen:
Salla-Maaria Raitala
Johanna Oksanen

Montonen (Schalin, Rakkolainen) – 11:32	1–0
	1–1	24:58 – Tallinen (Mustonen, Pelkonen (PP)
	1–2	43:06 – Byskata (Sundelin, Tervonen)
Nuutinen (Rakkolainen, Villilä) (PP) – 49:36	2–2
	2–3	52:01 – Kokora
Nuutinen (Villilä, Valkjärvi) (PP) – 58:04	3–3
Schalin (Villilä, Nuutinen) (PP) – 60:35	4–3

10 min
Penalties
10 min
52
Shots
28

4 March 2023; 15:00	Team Kuortane	0 – 3 (0–1, 0–2, 0–0)	Kiekko-Espoo	Kuortaneen jäähalli, Kuortane; Attendance: 80

Emilia Kyrkkö
Goalies
Tiia Pajarinen
Referee:
Joonas Nurmi
Linesmen:
Mika Pajunen
Joakim Rinta-Paavola

0–1	11:19 – Nuutinen (Schalin, Rakkolainen)
0–2	28:05 – Nuutinen (Schalin, Villilä)
0–3	38:27 – Rakkolainen (Nuutinen, Holmström)

2 min
Penalties
6 min
18
Shots
49

Kiekko-Espoo won the series in four games.

=== (4) HPK vs. (5) Ilves ===
All times local, Eastern European Time (UTC+02:00)

25 February 2023; 14:00	HPK Hämeenlinna	5 – 0 (1–0, 2–0, 2–0)	Ilves Tampere	Hämeenlinnan harjoitushalli, Hämeenlinna; Attendance: 160

Noora Räty
Goalies
Juuli Kivimäki
Referee:
Anniina Nurmi
Linesmen:
Veeti Hurme
Topi Laurila

Matejková (H. Seikkula) – 17:04	1–0
Mäkivaara (Záborská, Lehto) – 24:32	2–0
Erbanová (H. Seikkula, K. Seikkula) – 25:15	3–0
K. Seikkula (Matejková, H. Seikkula) – 45:24	4–0
Lehto (Koukkula, Ahlskog) (PP) – 52:50	5–0

10 min
Penalties
10 min
24
Shots
33

26 February 2023; 14:45	Ilves Tampere	5 – 1 (2–0, 3–0, 0–1)	HPK Hämeenlinna	Tesoman jäähalli, Tampere; Attendance: 125

Juuli Kivimäki
Goalies
Salla Sivula
Referee:
Anniina Nurmi
Linesmen:
Linnea Sainio
Tiina Saarimäki

Narinen (Rouhiainen, Mylläri) (PP) – 08:08	1–0
Kaitala (Mylläri, Puputti) – 16:13	2–0
Puputti (Kaitala, Varpula) – 34:59	3–0
T. Ollikainen (Melotindos, Timonen) – 37:58	4–0
Mylläri (Melotindos, Narinen) – 39:48	5–0
	5–1	41:59 – Matejková (K. Seikkula)

6 min
Penalties
10 min
36
Shots
21

1 March 2023; 18:45	HPK Hämeenlinna	5 – 3 (2–0, 2–1, 1–2)	Ilves Tampere	Hämeenlinnan harjoitushalli, Hämeenlinna; Attendance: 90

Noora Räty
Goalies
Juuli Kivimäki
Neea Pohjamo
Referee:
Kaisa Ketonen
Linesmen:
Tiina Saarimäki
Linnea Sainio

H. Seikkula (Matejková, K. Seikkula) – 06:19	1–0
Viitala – 14:21	2–0
	2–1	29:51 – V. Ollikainen (SH)
Skog (Matejková, K. Seikkula) (PP2) – 38:59	3–1
Ahlskog (Juříčková, Záborská) (PP) – 39:23	4–1
Matejková (PS) – 41:36	5–1
	5–2	57:32 – Melotindos (Mylläri, Rouhiainen)
	5–3	58:58 – Mylläri (Melotindos, Rouhiainen)

14 min
Penalties
12 min
27
Shots
25

4 March 2023; 12:00	Ilves Tampere	2 – 4 (1–0, 0–0, 1–4)	HPK Hämeenlinna	Tesoman jäähalli, Tampere; Attendance: 100

Juuli Kivimäki
Goalies
Noora Räty
Referee:
Kaisa Ketonen
Linesmen:
Jere Kaijanen
Tiina Saarimäki

Kaitala (Siira) – 17:46	1–0
	1–1	42:40 – Matejková (PS)
	1–2	43:30 – Mäkivaara (Lehto, Záborská)
	1–3	45:13 – Erbanová (H. Seikkula, Matejková)
Varpula (Kaitala) (PP) – 51:57	2–3
	2–4	59:14 – Lehto (EN)

4 min
Penalties
10 min
40
Shots
36

HPK won the series in four games.

=== Quarterfinal statistics ===
==== Scoring leaders ====
The following players led the league in quarterfinal points at the conclusion of the quarterfinals on Saturday, 4 March.

Note: This table includes games played during the quarterfinals only. For cumulative playoff totals, see Player statistics.

Player	Team	GP	G	A	Pts	PIM
Michaela Pejzlová	HIFK	3	6	5	11	0
Emilia Vesa	HIFK	3	3	7	10	0
Sanni Vanhanen	HIFK	3	5	3	8	0
Sofia Nuutinen	K-Espoo	4	5	3	8	0
Júlia Matejková	HPK	4	4	4	8	2
Jenna Kaila	KalPa	3	3	4	7	0
Siiri Yrjölä	HIFK	2	2	4	6	0
Johanna Juutilainen	KalPa	3	2	4	6	0
Sanni Rantala	KalPa	3	1	5	6	4
Clara Rozier	HIFK	3	3	2	5	0
Karoliina Rantamäki	HIFK	3	2	3	5	0
Julia Liikala	HIFK	3	2	3	5	2
Emmi Rakkolainen	K-Espoo	4	2	3	5	2
Noora Mylläri	Ilves	4	2	3	5	6
Julia Schalin	K-Espoo	4	1	4	5	0
Heta Seikkula	HPK	4	1	4	5	0
Kiti Seikkula	HPK	4	1	4	5	4

The following skaters were the top point scorers of teams not represented in the scoring leader table at the conclusion of the quarterfinals on 4 March 2023, noted with their overall league scoring rank:

- 21. Sofianna Sundelin (F), Kuortane: 4 GP, 3 G, 1 A, 5 Pts, 2 PIM
- 27. Heli Allinen (D), TPS: 3 GP, 1 G, 2 A, 3 Pts, 0 PIM
  Tereza Pištěková (F), TPS: 3 GP, 1 G, 2 A, 3 Pts, 0 PIM

==== Leading goaltenders ====
The following goaltenders had played at least two periods of a quarterfinal match at the conclusion of quarterfinals on Saturday, 4 March, sorted by save percentage.

Note: This table includes games played during the semifinals only. For cumulative playoff totals, see Player statistics.

Player	Team	GP	TOI	W	L	SA	GA	SO	SV%	GAA
Kiia Lahtinen	HIFK	2	120:00	2	0	25	0	2	100.0	0.00
Inna Kuusela	HIFK	1	60:00	1	0	21	0	1	100.0	0.00
Noora Räty	HPK	3	180:00	3	0	93	5	1	94.9	1.67
Tiia Pajarinen	K-Espoo	3	188:44	3	0	63	4	1	94.0	1.27
Emilia Kyrkkö	Kuortane	4	248:00	1	3	177	12	0	93.7	2.90
Mila Houni	TPS	1	51:12	0	1	21	2	0	91.3	2.34
Tiina Ranne	KalPa	3	180:00	3	0	80	8	0	90.9	2.67
Juuli Kivimäki	Ilves	4	218:55	1	3	88	13	0	87.1	3.56
Tea Koljonen	TPS	1	60:00	0	1	27	4	0	87.1	4.11
Salla Sivula	HPK	1	60:00	0	1	31	5	0	86.1	5.00
Kati Asikainen	Kärpät	3	177:46	0	3	131	25	0	84.0	8.44
Suvi Saarinen	TPS	2	65:15	0	1	30	6	0	83.3	5.52
Minja Drufva	K-Espoo	1	59:10	0	1	14	4	0	77.8	4.06

== Semifinals ==
The best-of-five semifinals (Finnish: välierät) will began on Tuesday, 7 March and concluded on Sunday, 12 March 2023.

=== (1) HIFK vs. (4) HPK ===
All times local, Eastern European Time (UTC+02:00)

7 March 2023; 19:00	IFK Helsinki	2 – 0 (0–0, 1–0, 1–0)	HPK Hämeenlinna	Pirkkolan jäähalli, Helsinki; Attendance: 179

Kiia Lahtinen	Goalies	Noora Räty	Referee: Henna Åberg; Linesmen: Johanna Oksanen; Helinä Anttila
Pejzlová (Rantamäki, Liikala) – 39:34 / 1–0; Pejzlová (Liikala) (EN) – 59:36 / 2–0			Referee: Henna Åberg; Linesmen: Johanna Oksanen; Helinä Anttila
4 min	Penalties	2 min	Referee: Henna Åberg; Linesmen: Johanna Oksanen; Helinä Anttila
37	Shots	21	Referee: Henna Åberg; Linesmen: Johanna Oksanen; Helinä Anttila

9 March 2023; 18:45	HPK Hämeenlinna	1 – 6 (0–0, 1–3, 0–3)	IFK Helsinki	Hämeenlinnan harjoitushalli, Hämeenlinna; Attendance: 150

Noora Räty
Goalies
Kiia Lahtinen
Referee:
Anniina Nurmi
Linesmen:
Linnea Sainio
Tiina Saarimäki

	0–1	24:06 – Saukkonen (Vanhanen)
	0–2	29:42 – Liikala (Pejzlová, Locatelli) (VR)
	0–3	33:37 – Rozier (Kylliäinen, Vesa (VR)
Matejková (Erbanová) – 38:32	1–3
	1–4	41:24 – Vanhanen
	1–5	55:40 – Pejzlová (EN)
	1–6	59:00 – Vesa (Vanhanen) (SH, EN)

4 min
Penalties
4 min
21
Shots
37

11 March 2023; 15:00	IFK Helsinki	6 – 2 (2–0, 2–1, 2–1)	HPK Hämeenlinna	Töölö 2, Helsinki; Attendance: 182

Kiia Lahtinen
Goalies
Noora Räty
Referee:
Henna Åberg
Linesmen:
Salla-Maaria Raitala
Helinä Anttila

Rozier (Vanhanen, Vesa) – 16:34	1–0
Kemppainen (Yrjölä, Liikala) (PP) – 18:52	2–0
Vanhanen (Vesa) – 30:49	3–0
	3–1	33:52 – Stoltenberg (Matejková, Mäkivaara)
Korhonen (Pejzlová, Kitula) – 39:04	4–1
Liikala (Pejzlová, Rantamäki) – 42:37	5–1
Rantamäki (Pejzlová, Saukkonen) – 56:43	6–1
	6–2	57:21 – K. Seikkula (VR)

6 min
Penalties
2 min
35
Shots
24

=== (2) KalPa vs. (3) K-Espoo ===
All times local, Eastern European Time (UTC+02:00) during 8–11 March and Eastern European Summer Time (UTC+03:00) during 12 March

8 March 2023; 18:00	KalPa Kuopio	2 – 3 OT (1–2, 0–0, 1–0) (OT: 0–1)	Kiekko-Espoo	Niirala, Kuopio; Attendance: 161

Tiina Ranne
Goalies
Tiia Pajarinen
Referee:
Johanna Tauriainen
Linesmen:
Santeri Smahl
Juuso Herranen

Kaila (Rantanen, Rantala) – 03:21	1–0
	1–1	03:56 – Montonen (Täks)
	1–2	11:36 – Täks (Aro, Schalin)
Jo. Juutilainen (Rantala, Rantanen) (DP) – 49:30	2–2
	2–3	60:23 – Rakkolainen (Villilä, Montonen)

2 min
Penalties
4 min
29
Shots
21

9 March 2023; 18:45	Kiekko-Espoo	2 – 3 OT (1–1, 1–1, 0–0) (OT: 0–1)	KalPa Kuopio	Tapiola 2, Espoo; Attendance: 86

Tiia Pajarinen
Goalies
Tiina Ranne
Referee:
Reetta-Kaisa Lusi
Linesmen:
Salla-Maaria Raitala
Johanna Oksanen

	0–1	04:37 – Kastikainen (Pohjala)
Katajamäki (Holmström) – 05:14	1–1
	1–2	21:05 – Hietala (Rantanen)
Nuutinen (Rakkolainen) – 35:29	2–2
	2–3	60:42 – Jo. Juutilainen (Rantanen, Kaila)

2 min
Penalties
2 min
31
Shots
21

11 March 2023; 12:30	KalPa Kuopio	1 – 2 OT (1–1, 0–0, 0–0) (OT: 0–1)	Kiekko-Espoo	Niirala, Kuopio; Attendance: 158

Tiina Ranne
Goalies
Tiia Pajarinen
Referee:
Johanna Tauriainen
Linesmen:
Santeri Smahl
Juuso Herranen

	0–1	02:06 – Rakkolainen (Nuutinen, Schalin)
Rantanen (Jo. Juutilainen, Rantala) (PP) – 12:04	1–1
	1–2	60:55 – Täks (Zielińska) (VR)

12 min
Penalties
4 min
19
Shots
30

12 March 2023; 15:45	Kiekko-Espoo	2 – 0 (1–0, 1–0, 0–0)	KalPa Kuopio	Tapiola 2, Espoo; Attendance: 146

Tiia Pajarinen	Goalies	Tiina Ranne	Referee: Reetta-Kaisa Lusi; Linesmen: Salla-Maaria Raitala; Johanna Oksanen
Schalin (Nuutinen, Villilä) (PP) – 13:19 / 1–0; Villilä (Schalin, Rakkolainen) (PP) – 23:44 / 2–0			Referee: Reetta-Kaisa Lusi; Linesmen: Salla-Maaria Raitala; Johanna Oksanen
2 min	Penalties	10 min	Referee: Reetta-Kaisa Lusi; Linesmen: Salla-Maaria Raitala; Johanna Oksanen
35	Shots	24	Referee: Reetta-Kaisa Lusi; Linesmen: Salla-Maaria Raitala; Johanna Oksanen

Third seed Kiekko-Espoo unexpectedly won the series against second seed KalPa in four games, proceeding to their fifth consecutive Aurora Borealis Cup finals.

=== Semifinal statistics ===
==== Scoring leaders ====
The following players led the league in points scored in the semifinals at the conclusion of the series on Sunday, 12 March.

Note: This table includes games played during the semifinals only. For cumulative totals, see Player statistics.

Player	Team	GP	G	A	Pts	PIM
Michaela Pejzlová	HIFK	3	2	5	7	0
Julia Liikala	HIFK	3	2	3	5	0
Sanni Vanhanen	HIFK	3	2	3	5	0
Salla Rantanen	KalPa	4	1	4	5	0
Emmi Rakkolainen	K-Espoo	4	2	2	4	0
Emilia Vesa	HIFK	3	1	3	4	0
Julia Schalin	K-Espoo	4	1	3	4	0
Johanna Juutilainen	KalPa	4	2	1	3	2
Lisette Täks	K-Espoo	4	2	1	3	0
Karoliina Rantamäki	HIFK	3	1	2	3	0
Sofia Nuutinen	K-Espoo	4	1	2	3	0
Tea Villilä	K-Espoo	4	1	2	3	0
Sanni Rantala	KalPa	4	0	3	3	0
Clara Rozier	HIFK	3	2	0	2	2
Júlia Matejková	HPK	3	1	1	2	4
Michaela Saukkonen	HIFK	3	1	1	2	6

== Bronze medal game ==
The Aurora Borealis Cup bronze medal game (Finnish: pronssiottelu) was played on Saturday, 18 March 2023. KalPa won the game and claimed the fourth Finnish Championship bronze medal in team history.

Game time local, Eastern European Summer Time (UTC+03:00)

18 March 2023; 12:00	KalPa Kuopio	3 – 1 (1–1, 1–0, 1–0)	HPK Hämeenlinna	Niirala, Kuopio; Attendance: 236

Tiina Ranne
Goalies
Noora Räty
Referee:
Johanna Tauriainen
Linesmen:
Linnea Sainio
Tiina Saarimäki

Kortelainen (Koljonen) – 01:20	1–0
	1–1	13:57 – Matejková (Juříčková)
Rantanen (Kaila, Knee) (VR) – 31:12	2–1
Rantala (EN) – 59:32	3–1

4 min
Penalties
2 min
34
Shots
17

== Finals ==
The best-of-five Finnish Championship finals (Finnish: Suomen mestaruus finaalit or SM-finaalit) or grand finale (Finnish: loppuottelut) began on Saturday, 18 March and the Aurora Borealis Cup was awarded on 21 March 2023.

All times local, Eastern European Summer Time (UTC+03:00)

18 March 2023; 16:30	IFK Helsinki	9 – 2 (2–1, 3–0, 4–1)	Kiekko-Espoo	Pirkkolan jäähalli, Helsinki; Attendance: 274

Kiia Lahtinen
Goalies
Tiia Pajarinen
Minja Drufva
Referee:
Henna Åberg
Linesmen:
Johanna Oksanen
Helinä Anttila

Liikala (Yrjölä, Pejzlová) (PP) – 12:57	1–0
Liikala (Pejzlová) (SH) – 14:02	2–0
	2–1	19:08 – Zielińska (Montonen, Katajamäki) (PP)
Vanhanen (Rozier, Locatelli) – 31:01	3–1
Vesa (Vanhanen) – 32:10	4–1
Vesa (Vanhanen, Korhonen) – 37:18	5–1
Rozier (Vesa) – 45:53	6–1
Pejzlová (Liikala) – 53:28	7–1
Rantamäki (Pejzlová, Yrjölä) – 53:28	8–1
	8–2	54:10 – Haukijärvi (Täks, Aro)
Vanhanen (Liikala, Rantamäki) – 55:07	9–2

4 min
Penalties
12 min
28
Shots
16

19 March 2023; 16:15	Kiekko-Espoo	0 – 4 (0–1, 0–2, 0–1)	IFK Helsinki	Tapiola 2, Espoo; Attendance: 269

Tiia Pajarinen
Goalies
Kiia Lahtinen
Referee:
Anniina Nurmi
Linesmen:
Tiina Saarimäki
Salla-Maaria Raitala

0–1	13:22 – Vanhanen (Vesa, Rozier)
0–2	36:32 – Mehtonen (Rantamäki) (DP)
0–3	37:31 – Vesa (Yrjölä, Pejzlová) (PP)
0–4	43:00 – Locatelli (Rozier) (PP)

10 min
Penalties
6 min
21
Shots
23

21 March 2023; 18:00	IFK Helsinki	3 – 2 (1–1, 1–0, 1–1)	Kiekko-Espoo	Töölö, Helsinki; Attendance: 1,311

Kiia Lahtinen
Goalies
Tiia Pajarinen
Referee:
Anniina Nurmi
Linesmen:
Tiina Saarimäki
Salla-Maaria Raitala

	0–1	16:01 – Täks (Katajamäki) (VR)
Vanhanen (Rantamäki, Rozier) (PP) – 18:50	1–1
Pejzlová (Liikala, Rantamäki) – 32:55	2–1
	2–2	58:26 – Rakkolainen (Valkjärvi) (EA)
Vanhanen (Rozier, Liikala) (VR) – 59:24	3–2

12 min
Penalties
12 min
24
Shots
32

== Player statistics ==
=== Scoring leaders ===
The following players were the playoff point leaders at the conclusion of the playoffs on Tuesday, 21 March 2023.

Player	Team	GP	G	A	Pts	PIM
Michaela Pejzlová	HIFK	9	11	13	24	2
Sanni Vanhanen	HIFK	9	12	8	20	0
Emilia Vesa	HIFK	9	7	12	19	0
Julia Liikala	HIFK	9	6	10	16	4
Clara Rozier	HIFK	9	6	7	13	4
Karoliina Rantamäki	HIFK	9	4	9	13	0
Júlia Matejková	HPK	8	6	5	11	6
Sofia Nuutinen	K-Espoo	11	6	5	11	0
Emmi Rakkolainen	K-Espoo	11	5	5	10	8
Jenna Kaila	KalPa	8	4	6	10	2
Siiri Yrjölä	HIFK	8	2	8	10	0
Sanni Rantala	KalPa	8	2	8	10	4
Salla Rantanen	KalPa	8	4	5	9	0
Johanna Juutilainen	KalPa	8	4	5	9	2
Julia Schalin	K-Espoo	11	2	7	9	2

=== Leading goaltenders ===
The following goaltenders had played at least thirty minutes or half a playoff match at the conclusion of games played Sunday, 19 March, sorted by save percentage.

Team eliminated in quarterfinals

Player	Team	GP	TOI	W	L	SA	GA	SO	SV%	GAA
Inna Kuusela	HIFK	1	60:00	1	0	21	0	1	100.0	0.00
Kiia Lahtinen	HIFK	7	420:00	7	0	123	5	4	96.1	0.71
Emilia Kyrkkö	Kuortane	4	248:00	1	3	177	12	0	93.7	2.90
Noora Räty	HPK	7	414:34	3	4	219	18	1	92.4	2.61
Tiina Ranne	KalPa	8	480:20	5	3	212	18	0	92.	2.25
Mila Houni	TPS	1	51:12	0	1	21	2	0	91.3	2.34
Tiia Pajarinen	K-Espoo	9	527:17	6	3	170	19	2	89.9	2.16
Juuli Kivimäki	Ilves	4	218:55	1	3	88	13	0	87.1	3.56
Tea Koljonen	TPS	1	58:22	0	1	27	4	0	87.1	4.11
Salla Sivula	HPK	1	60:00	0	1	31	5	0	86.1	5.00
Kati Asikainen	Kärpät	3	177:46	0	3	131	25	0	84.0	8.44
Suvi Saarinen	TPS	2	65:15	0	1	30	6	0	83.3	5.52
Minja Drufva	K-Espoo	2	79:10	0	1	24	8	0	75.0	6.06
