= 2022 Aurora Borealis Cup playoffs =

Finnish Championship tournament in women's ice hockey, 38th edition

Naisten Liiga pudotuspelit 2022 (Finnish) 2022 Naisten Liiga playoffs

Tournament details
- Venues: 9 (in 8 host cities)
- Dates: 26 March 2022–24 April 2022
- Format: Best-of-five
- Teams: 8
- Defending champions: Kiekko-Espoo

Final positions
- Champions: Kiekko-Espoo (16th title)
- Runners-up: HIFK Helsinki
- Third place: Kärpät Oulu
- Fourth place: TPS Turku

Tournament statistics
- Games played: 26
- Goals scored: 161 (6.19 per game)
- Attendance: 4,614 (177 per game)
- Scoring leader(s): Elisa Holopainen (29 points)

Awards
- MVP: Nelli Laitinen

The 2022 Aurora Borealis Cup playoffs or the 2022 Naisten Liiga playoffs (Finnish: Naisten Liiga pudotuspelit 2022) is the playoff tournament of the 2021–22 season of the Naisten Liiga. The tournament began on 26 March and the Aurora Borealis Cup was awarded to Kiekko-Espoo Naiset on 24 April.

== Playoff bracket ==
Quarterfinals
1	Kiekko-Espoo	3
8	KalPa Kuopio	1
4	Ilves Tampere	0
5	TPS Turku	3
2	HIFK Helsinki	3
7	HPK Hämeenlinna	1
3	Kärpät Oulu	3
6	Team Kuortane	0

Semifinals
1	Kiekko-Espoo	3
5	TPS Turku	0
2	HIFK Helsinki	3
3	Kärpät Oulu	0

Finals
1st place, gold medalist(s)	Kiekko-Espoo	3
2nd place, silver medalist(s)	HIFK Helsinki	2
Bronze medal game
3rd place, bronze medalist(s)	Kärpät Oulu	3
4	TPS Turku	2

== Quarterfinals ==
The best-of-five quarterfinals (Finnish: puolivälierät) began on 26 March. Games were scheduled to be played on 26, 27, and 31 March, and 2 and 3 April. Home ice advantage was granted to the higher seeded teams for the first, third, and potential fifth games.

=== (1) Kiekko-Espoo vs. (8) KalPa ===
Kiekko-Espoo claimed the first seed after winning the regular season title with 2.77 points per game, marking the team’s fourth consecutive regular season victory. After a dismal preliminary series in which they finished with just half a point per game, KalPa went on to win eight of ten games in the lower division series – six in regulation, two in overtime – to secure the eighth seed. The teams last met in the 2020–21 Aurora Borealis Cup finals, the first time in team history KalPa played in the Finnish Championship finals, which Kiekko-Espoo won in four games. They faced one another three times during the 2021–22 preliminaries, all three games resulting in decisive victories for Kiekko-Espoo.

Game times in Eastern European Time (UTC+02:00)

26 March 2022; 12:45	Kiekko-Espoo	8–0 (0–0, 5–0, 3–0)	KalPa Kuopio	Tapiolan harjoitusareena, Espoo; Attendance: 76

Game reference

Tiia Pajarinen
Goalies
Tiina Ranne
Referee:
Petri Uotila
Linesmen:
Salla-Maaria Raitala
Jenni Heikkinen

Holopainen (Rantala, Aro) – 20:31	1–0
Holopainen (Haukijärvi, Rakkolainen) – PP – 25:34	2–0
Haukijärvi (Holopainen, Rakkolainen) – 36:32	3–0
Holopainen – 38:15	4–0
Rakkolainen (Holopainen) – 39:59	5–0
Holopainen – 43:46	6–0
Viitasuo (Yrjänen) – 46:35	7–0
Montonen (Yrjänen, Viitasuo) – PP – 53:16	8–0

20 min
Penalties
16 min
61
Shots
18

27 March 2022; 16:15	KalPa Kuopio	3–6 (2–3, 0–2, 1–1)	Kiekko-Espoo	Niiralan Monttu, Kuopio; Attendance: 103

Game reference

Tiina Ranne
Goalies
Tiia Pajarinen
Referee:
Sini Kauhanen
Linesmen:
Joonas Heinonen
Lenni Jukola

	0–1	2:13 – Holopainen (Rantala, Valkjärvi)
Niskanen (Juutilainen, Koljonen) – 3:47	1–1
	1–2	5:16 – Rantala (Holopainen)
Juutilainen (Niskanen) – SH – 9:11	2–2
	2–3	19:12 – PP – Montonen (Vesa, Villilä)
	2–4	21:11 – Yrjänen (Villilä)
	2–5	33:22 – PP – Yrjänen (Viitasuo, Montonen)
	2–6	55:23 – Montonen (Yrjänen, Vesa)
Mäkelä (Juutilainen, Niskanen) – PP, EN – 58:58	3–6

8 min
Penalties
6 min
20
Shots
59

31 March 2022; 18:45	Kiekko-Espoo	2–4 (0–1, 1–0, 1–3)	KalPa Kuopio	Tapiolan harjoitusareena, Espoo; Attendance: 60

Game reference

Minja Drufva
Goalies
Tiina Ranne
Referee:
Jenni Jaatinen
Linesmen:
Elisa Vaittinen
Julia Halme

	0–1	02:24 – PP – Nurmi (Pohjala, Lappi)
Yrjänen (Montonen, Vesa) – 34:50	1–1
Laitinen (Holopainen, Rakkolainen) – 44:38	2–1
	2–2	52:20 – Mäkelä (Niskanen)
	2–3	59:21 – Niskanen (Juutilainen)
	2–4	59:45 – EN – Juutilainen (Niskanen, Kortelainen)

8 min
Penalties
12 min
73
Shots
15

2 April 2022; 16:30	KalPa Kuopio	0–7 (0–1, 0–2, 0–4)	Kiekko-Espoo	Niiralan Monttu, Kuopio; Attendance: 102

Game reference

Tiina Ranne
Goalies
Tiia Pajarinen
Referee:
Sini Kauhanen
Linesmen:
Roni Kankkunen
Oskari Hentunen

0–1	14:25 – Rakkolainen (Laitinen, Holopainen)
0–2	35:33 – Haukijärvi
0–3	39:42 – Laitinen (Haukijärvi)
0–4	44:26 – Holopainen (Laitinen, Rantala)
0–5	56:15 – EN – Holopainen (Rakkolainen)
0–6	57:42 – Laitinen (Rantala)
0–7	58:21 – Holopainen (Laitinen)

4 min
Penalties
6 min
18
Shots
56

=== (2) HIFK vs. (7) HPK ===
After claiming the 2021 Finnish Championship bronze medal in their third Naisten Liiga season, HIFK Helsinki continued their incredible upward trajectory to claim the second seed after completing the regular season with 2.69 points per game (78 points in 29 games). They were propelled by the production of Matilda Nilsson, the regular season goal scoring champion, who scored 37 goals and 18 assists for 55 points in 29 games; Czech Olympian Michaela Pejzlová, who tallied 42 points from 15 goals and 27 assists despite playing just 21 games; French forward Emmanuelle Passard, who notched 18 goals, 33 points, and an unheard of zero penalty minutes in 28 games; and Finnish Olympian Julia Liikala, who tabbed 15 goals and 33 points in 27 games.

After finishing seventh in the preliminaries with only 26 points in 20 games (1.30 points per game), HPK Hämeenlinna found their rhythm and were undefeated in the lower division standings, earning the seventh seed with 3.00 points per game. The team's change in luck was due to the net minding of newly acquired Canadian goaltender Kassidy Sauvé, who had a .964 save percentage and 0.88 goals against average in eight games in the lower division.

HIFK won both games of the 2021–22 season series with HPK, which were played in the preliminaries. Prior to this matchup, HIFK and HPK had never met in the Naisten Liiga playoffs.

Game times in Eastern European Time (UTC+02:00)

26 March 2022; 16:00	HIFK Helsinki	2–0 (0–0, 1–0, 1–0)	HPK Hämeenlinna	Pirkkolan jäähalli, Helsinki; Attendance: 161

Game reference
Iina Kuusela	Goalies	Kassidy Sauvé	Referee: Jasu Raja; Linesmen: Johanna Oksanen; Helinä Anttila
Pejzlová (Nilsson, Passard) – PP – 30:22 / 1–0; Passard (Yrjölä, Parkkonen) – 44:41 / 2–0			Referee: Jasu Raja; Linesmen: Johanna Oksanen; Helinä Anttila
2 min	Penalties	8 min	Referee: Jasu Raja; Linesmen: Johanna Oksanen; Helinä Anttila
42	Shots	18	Referee: Jasu Raja; Linesmen: Johanna Oksanen; Helinä Anttila

27 March 2022; 14:45	HPK Hämeenlinna	3–2 (0–2, 2–0, 1–0)	HIFK Helsinki	Jääliikuntakeskus Hakio, Hämeenlinna; Attendance: 80

Game reference

Kassidy Sauvé
Goalies
Iina Kuusela
Referee:
Henna Åberg
Linesmen:
Linnea Sainio
Tiina Saarimäki

	0–1	6:16 – Locatelli (Pejzlová, Nilsson)
	0–2	15:01 – PP – Kemppainen (Yrjöla, Parkkonen)
Lehto (K. Seikkula, H. Seikkula) – 26:50	1–2
Matejková (Benoit, K. Seikkula) – 28:11	2–2
Stoltenberg (Mäkivaara) – 45:23	3–2

6 min
Penalties
6 min
21
Shots
46

31 March 2022; 18:00	HIFK Helsinki	3–1 (1–0, 1–0, 1–1)	HPK Hämeenlinna	Pirkkolan jäähalli, Helsinki; Attendance: 134

Game reference

Iina Kuusela
Goalies
Kassidy Sauvé
Referee:
Henna Åberg
Linesmen:
Salla-Maaria Raitala
Johanna Oksanen

Pejzlová (Rozier, Passard) – 07:26	1–0
Locatelli (Nilsson, Kemppainen) – 39:30	2–0
	2–1	54:59 – DP – Mäkivaara (Benoit, H. Seikkula)
Liikala – EN – 59:44	3–1

2 min
Penalties
16 min
17
Shots
49

2 April 2022; 14:00	HPK Hämeenlinna	1–3 (0–0, 1–1, 0–2)	HIFK Helsinki	Jääliikuntakeskus Hakio, Hämeenlinna; Attendance: 110

Game reference

Kassidy Sauvé
Goalies
Iina Kuusela
Referee:
Kaisa Ketonen
Linesmen:
Linnea Sainio
Reetta-Kaisa Lusi

	0–1	33:15 – Locatelli
Delay (Stoltenberg, Mäkivaara) – 38:31	1–1
	1–2	46:58 – PP – Nilsson (Pejzlová)
	1–3	50:42 – PP – Pejzlová (Passard, Parkkonen)

16 min
Penalties
27 min
17
Shots
55

=== (3) Kärpät vs. (6) Kuortane ===
Game times in Eastern European Time (UTC+02:00)

26 March 2022; 17:00	Kärpät Oulu	4–3 (1–1, 0–1, 3–1)	Team Kuortane	Raksilan jäähalli, Oulu; Attendance: 212

Game reference

Kati Asikainen
Goalies
Hannele Tarkiainen
Referee:
Johanna Tauriainen
Linesmen:
Isa Rahunen
Krista Palola

	0–1	7:51 – Tervonen (Nurminen, Varjonen)
Antti-Roiko (Lindholm, Käyhkö) – PP – 12:27	1–1
	1–2	32:36 – PP – Tervonen (Kaila, Täks)
Keränen (Havana) – 48:29	2–2
	2–3	50:41 – PP – Kaila (Sundelin)
Antti-Roiko (Kaijankoski) – 51:50	3–3
Käyhkö (Ukkola, Antti-Roiko) – 59:00	4–3

8 min
Penalties
8 min
37
Shots
17

27 March 2022; 15:00	Team Kuortane	2–4 (1–2, 1–2, 0–0)	Kärpät Oulu	Kuortaneen jäähalli, Kuortane; Attendance: 60

Game reference

Hannele Tarkiainen
Goalies
Johanna Oksman
Referee:
Johanna Tauriainen
Linesmen:
Isa Rahunen
Krista Palola

	0–1	10:52 – PP – Käyhkö (Lindholm, Yli-Mäenpää)
	0–2	17:13 – Käyhkö (Lindholm, Kaijankoski)
Tervonen (Sundelin, Ojala) – 19:37	1–2
	1–3	31:18 – Huttula (Havana, Keränen)
Tervonen (Ojala, Krook) – 32:59	2–3
	2–4	38:22 – Kaijankoski

18 min
Penalties
6 min
28
Shots
36

31 March 2022; 18:30	Kärpät Oulu	6–1 (1–0, 3–0, 2–1)	Team Kuortane	Raksilan jäähalli, Oulu; Attendance: 132

Game reference

Kati Asikainen
Goalies
Hannele Tarkiainen
Referee:
Johanna Tauriainen
Linesmen:
Isa Rahunen
Krista Palola

Antti-Roiko (Lindholm, Yli-Mäenpää) – 03:01	1–0
Antti-Roiko (Kaijankoski, Yli-Mäenpää) – 22:56	2–0
Harju (Seppänen) – 24:09	3–0
Havana (Yli-Mäenpää, Kaijankoski) – 34:32	4–0
Havana (Huttula, Yli-Mäenpää) – 55:48	5–0
	5–1	57:22 – PP – Tervonen (Koukkula, Kaila)
Yli-Mäenpää (Käyhkö, Antti-Roiko) – 59:22	6–1

10 min
Penalties
4 min
43
Shots
25

=== (4) Ilves vs. (5) TPS ===
Game times in Eastern European Time (UTC+02:00)

26 March 2022; 14:30	Ilves Tampere	2–3 (1–0, 1–1, 0–2)	TPS Turku	Tesoman jäähalli, Tampere; Attendance: 90

Game reference

Anni Keisala
Goalies
Mila Houni
Referee:
Anniina Nurmi
Linesmen:
Linnea Sainio
Tiina Saarimäki

Laitila (Rouhiainen) – 16:46	1–0
Suoranta (Ollikainen) – 32:28	2–0
	2–1	35:53 – Lukkarila (Salonen)
	2–2	50:59 – PP – Duvin (Otamo, Metsä-Tokila)
	2–3	56:04 – SH – Duvin

4 min
Penalties
6 min
30
Shots
43

27 March 2022; 12:30	TPS Turku	2–1 (0–1, 1–0, 1–0)	Ilves Tampere	Kupittaan monitoimihalli, Turku; Attendance: 63

Game reference

Mila Houni
Goalies
Anni Keisala
Referee:
Johanna Oksanen
Linesmen:
Markus Ketola
Julia Halme

	0–1	14:53 – PP – Suoranta (Varpula)
Otamo (Berg, Timonen) – 35:06	1–1
Metsä-Tokila (Enström, Välikangas) – 53:54	2–1

6 min
Penalties
10 min
34
Shots
24

31 March 2022; 19:15	Ilves Tampere	1–3 (0–2, 0–0, 1–1)	TPS Turku	Tesoman jäähalli, Tampere; Attendance: 70

Game reference

Anni Keisala
Goalies
Mila Houni
Referee:
Anniina Nurmi
Linesmen:
Linnea Sainio
Tiina Saarimäki

	0–1	15:56 – PP – Otamo (Duvin, Metsä-Tokila)
	0–2	18:07 – Metsä-Tokila (Otamo, Duvin)
Melotindos (Lehtiniemi, Riipinen) – PP, NG – 57:13	1–2
	1–3	59:22 – EN – Lukkarila (Duvin)

6 min
Penalties
10 min
26
Shots
33

== Semifinals ==
The best-of-five semifinals (Finnish: välierät) will begin on Wednesday, 6 April and conclude no later than Friday, 15 April.

=== Kiekko-Espoo vs. TPS ===
Reigning Finnish Champions Kiekko-Espoo earned placement in the semifinals after defeating eighth-seeded KalPa Kuopio in four quarterfinal games. Elisa Holopainen of Kiekko-Espoo claimed a dominant lead on the playoff scoring tables, notching 8 goals and 13 points in four games to top the charts in both categories, sitting a comfortable three goals and seven points ahead of the second-ranked competitors. Her 5 assists tied with Jonna Yli-Mäenpää of Kärpät for first in the league. Kiekko-Espoo also boasted the highest scoring defenceman in Nelli Laitinen, who scored 3 goals and 3 assists in just two games played. In net, Tiia Pajarinen, the 2021 Aurora Borealis Cup MVP, played three of four games for Kiekko-Espoo and maintained a sublime .946 save percentage, good for third in the league, and a league-leading 1.00 goals against average (GAA).

In the only upset of the quarterfinals, fifth-seed TPS Turku shutout fourth-seed Ilves Tampere in three games to earn the first semifinal berth in team history. Their victory was propelled by the elite scoring of their top-line – centre Estelle Duvin and wingers Maija Otamo and Emmi Metsä-Tokila – each of whom netted 2 goals in the quarterfinals. Duvin tallied 3 assists for 5 points in three games and placed twelfth on the scoring table, while both Otamo and Metsä-Tokila notched 2 assists for 4 points, tying with Oona Havana of Kärpät for sixteenth on the scoring table. Goaltender Mila Houni was a surprise standout for TPS in the quarterfinals, following an unimpressive regular season that culminated in a .892 save percentage and 3.97 goals against average across thirteen games. In the first round of the playoffs, Houni ranked second in the league in save percentage, at .951, and third in goals against average, with 1.33, while playing every minute of the three game series.

Kiekko-Espoo won all four games of the 2021–22 season series with HPK, two of which were played in the preliminaries and two in the regular season.

Kiekko-Espoo and TPS have never met in the Naisten Liiga playoffs prior to this matchup.

Game times in Eastern European Time (UTC+02:00)

6 April 2022; 19:05	Kiekko-Espoo	5–1 (1–0, 1–1, 3–0)	TPS Turku	Tapiola 2, Espoo; Attendance: 71

Game reference

Tiia Pajarinen
Goalies
Mila Houni
Referee:
Kaisa Ketonen
Linesmen:
Linnea Sainio
Johanna Oksanen

Schalin (Nuutinen, Katajamäki) – 08:19	1–0
Haukijärvi (Holopainen, Valkjärvi) – 25:25	2–0
	2–1	30:32 – Duvin (Metsä-Tokila, Otamo)
Katajamäki (Rakkolainen, Laitinen) – PP – 40:23	3–1
Yrjänen (Montonen) – EN – 57:33	4–1
Haukijärvi – 58:17	5–1

8 min
Penalties
8 min
40
Shots
19

9 April 2022; 17:30	TPS Turku	2–6 (1–3, 1–2, 0–1)	Kiekko-Espoo	Kupittaa, Turku; Attendance: 72

Game reference

Mila Houni
Goalies
Tiia Pajarinen
Referee:
Anniina Nurmi
Linesmen:
Johanna Oksanen
Julia Halme

	0–1	00:19 – Rakkolainen (Holopainen, Haukijärvi)
Duvin (Metsä-Tokila, Otamo) – 02:20	1–1
	1–2	04:51 – VR – Holopainen (Rakkolainen, Haukijärvi)
	1–3	15:33 – Holopainen (Laitinen, Rakkolainen)
Duvin (Metsä-Tokila, Berg) – 25:22	2–3
	2–4	31:14 – Valkjärvi (Schalin, Katajamäki)
	2–5	39:30 – Holopainen (Haukijärvi)
	2–6	52:48 – Holopainen (Laitinen)

2 min
Penalties
2 min
22
Shots
36

10 April 2022; 16:35	Kiekko-Espoo	7–1 (1–0, 3–1, 3–0)	TPS Turku	Tapiola 2, Espoo; Attendance: 95

Game reference

Tiia Pajarinen
Goalies
Mila Houni
Referee:
Henna Åberg
Linesmen:
Johanna Oksanen
Helinä Anttila

Holopainen (Rantala, Laitinen) – 09:22	1–0
	1–1	23:23 – Duvin (Heikkinen)
Holopainen (Rakkolainen, Laitinen) – PP – 29:36	2–1
Villilä – DP – 35:06	3–1
Katajamäki (Holopainen, Laitinen) – 36:10	4–1
Rantala (Holopainen, Haukijärvi) – 51:16	5–1
Nuutinen (Vesa, Haukijärvi) – 52:04	6–1
Montonen (Vesa, Nuutinen) – 58:00	7–1

6 min
Penalties
4 min
38
Shots
19

=== HIFK vs. Kärpät ===
Game times in Eastern European Time (UTC+02:00)

6 April 2022; 19:30	HIFK Helsinki	4–2 (0–0, 3–1, 1–1)	Kärpät Oulu	Pirkkolan jäähalli, Helsinki; Attendance: 125

Game reference

Iina Kuusela
Goalies
Kati Asikainen
Referee:
Anniina Nurmi
Linesmen:
Salla-Maaria Raitala
Helinä Anttila

Virtanen (Passard, Saukkonen) – 22:54	1–0
Pejzlová (Locatelli) – 24:59	2–0
Liikala (Locatelli, Rantamäki) – 30:25	3–0
	3–1	36:29 – PP – Kaijankoski (Anttii-Roiko, Yli-Mäenpää)
	3–2	54:57 – Männikkö (Antti-Roiko)
Pejzlová – 58:11	4–2

4 min
Penalties
4 min
37
Shots
18

9 April 2022; 12:30	Kärpät Oulu	4–6 (1–2, 1–3, 2–1)	HIFK Helsinki	Raksila, Oulu; Attendance: 203

Game reference

Kati Asikainen
Goalies
Iina Kuusela
Referee:
Johanna Tauriainen
Linesmen:
Isa Rahunen
Krista Palola

	0–1	01:06 – Yrjölä (Nilsson)
	0–2	10:34 – PP – Pejzlová (Rozier)
Keränen (Yli-Mäenpää, Sarkkinen Mata) – 19:15	1–2
	1–3	30:45 – Vihervouri (Heikuri, Rozier)
	1–4	34:31 – Virtanen (Nilsson, Pejzlová)
	1–5	37:26 – Nilsson (Locatelli, Kemppainen)
Anttii-Roiko (Lindholm) – 39:19	2–5
	2–6	40:09 – Liikala (Rantamäki, Saukkonen)
Ylitalo (Ekoluoma, Wäänänen) – 45:41	3–6
Huttula (Keränen) – PP – 54:20	4–6

6 min
Penalties
4 min
23
Shots
38

10 April 2022; 15:00	HIFK Helsinki	3–0 (1–0, 1–0, 1–0)	Kärpät Oulu	Pirkkolan jäähalli, Helsinki; Attendance: 298

Game reference

Iina Kuusela
Goalies
Kati Asikainen
Referee:
Anniina Nurmi
Linesmen:
Linnea Sainio
Jenni Heikkinen

Rantamäki (Pejzlová, Liikala) – 18:47	1–0
Rantamäki (Kemppainen, Locatelli) – PP – 34:57	2–0
Locatelli – 43:13	3–0

20 min
Penalties
2 min
31
Shots
30

== Bronze medal game ==
The Aurora Borealis Cup bronze medal was contested in a one-game bronze medal match (Finnish: pronssiottelu) on Sunday, 17 April. Oulun Kärpät bested TPS in overtime to win their eighth Finnish Championship bronze medal.

17 April 2022; 15:00	Kärpät Oulu	3–2 OT (0–1, 1–1, 1–0) (OT: 1–0)	TPS Turku	Raksilan jäähalli, Oulu; Attendance: 362

Game reference

Kati Asikainen
Goalies
Mila Houni
Referee:
Johanna Tauriainen
Linesmen:
Niko Raitoainen
Krista Palola

	0–1	13:40 – Duvin (Otamo, Välikangas)
	0–2	24:22 – Otamo (Metsä-Tokila, Duvin)
Huttula (Käyhkö, Lindholm) – 35:27	1–2
Keränen (Huttula) – 45:12	2–2
Antti-Roiko (Käyhkö) – SH – 69:31	3–2

20 min
Penalties
4 min
21
Shots
38

== Finals ==
The best-of-five Finnish Championship finals (Finnish: Suomen mestaruus finaalit or SM-finaalit) began on 17 April and concluded on 24 April. After coming back from a two-game deficit to push the series to game five, HIFK were unable to overcome the defending champions and Kiekko-Espoo ultimately claimed their sixteenth Finnish Championship title.

17 April 2022; 16:00	Kiekko-Espoo	5–0 (2–0, 1–0, 2–0)	HIFK Helsinki	Tapiola 2, Espoo; Attendance: 286

Game reference

Tiia Pajarinen
Goalies
Iina Kuusela
Referee:
Kaisa Ketonen
Linesmen:
Linnea Sainio
Johanna Oksanen

Leinonen (Yrjänen, Viitasuo) – PP – 07:26	1–0
Rakkolainen (Rantala, Laitinen) – PP – 10:36	2–0
Laitinen – 26:26	3–0
Katajamäki (Viitasuo, Yrjänen) – 51:10	4–0
Laitinen (Rakkolainen) – 56:28	5–0

4 min
Penalties
8 min
48
Shots
34

18 April 2022; 15:00	HIFK Helsinki	2–6 (0–1, 0–3, 2–2)	Kiekko-Espoo	Pirkkolan jäähalli, Helsinki; Attendance: 332

Game reference

Iina Kuusela
Goalies
Tiia Pajarinen
Referee:
Anniina Nurmi
Linesmen:
Linnea Sainio
Helinä Anttila

	0–1	10:22 – PP – Yrjänen (Villilä, Leinonen)
	0–2	25:14 – Laitinen (Katajamäki)
	0–3	28:36 – Vesa (Viitasuo, Nuutinen)
	0–4	28:57 – Haukijärvi (Laitinen, Rantala)
Yrjölä (Parkkonen) – 45:54	1–4
	1–5	48:06 – Holopainen (Laitinen, Rantala)
Pejzlová (Rantamäki) – 57:22	2–5
	2–6	58:31 – EN – Holopainen (Haukijärvi, Rantala)

6 min
Penalties
8 min
35
Shots
33

20 April 2022; 19:15	Kiekko-Espoo	3–6 (0–2, 2–2, 1–2)	HIFK Helsinki	Tapiola 2, Espoo; Attendance: 383

Game reference

Tiia Pajarinen
Minja Drufva
Goalies
Iina Kuusela
Referee:
Kaisa Ketonen
Linesmen:
Linnea Sainio
Johanna Oksanen

	0–1	05:01 – SH – Nilsson (Pejzlová)
	0–2	09:40 – Liikala (Rantamäki, Pejzlová)
	0–3	25:14 – PP – Parkkonen (Yrjölä, Liikala)
Katajamäki (Schalin, Yrjänen) – 29:27	1–3
Holopainen (Rakkolainen) – SH – 32:47	2–3
	2–4	36:05 – Liikala (Rantamäki)
	2–5	49:35 – Passard (Yrjölä, Rozier)
Viitasuo (Yrjänen) – 56:53	3–5
	3–6	57:45 – EN – Pejzlová

33 min
Penalties
8 min
28
Shots
23

23 April 2022; 15:00	HIFK Helsinki	4–1 (1–1, 1–0, 2–0)	Kiekko-Espoo	Pirkkolan jäähalli, Helsinki; Attendance: 483

Game reference

Iina Kuusela
Goalies
Tiia Pajarinen
Referee:
Anniina Nurmi
Linesmen:
Linnea Sainio
Johanna Oksanen

	0–1	12:05 – PP – Villilä (Yrjänen, Viitasuo)
Nilsson – 18:57	1–1
Liikala (Pejzlová) – 20:25	2–1
Pejzlová (Liikala, Rantamäki) – 46:40	3–1
Pejzlová – EN – 59:17	4–1

16 min
Penalties
14 min
28
Shots
29

24 April 2022; 16:00	Kiekko-Espoo	8–3 (1–1, 3–0, 4–2)	HIFK Helsinki	Tapiola 2, Espoo; Attendance: 450

Game reference

Tiia Pajarinen
Goalies
Iina Kuusela
Referee:
Anniina Nurmi
Linesmen:
Linnea Sainio
Johanna Oksanen

	0–1	03:20 – Nilsson
Laitinen (Schalin) – 17:36	1–1
Montonen (Yrjänen) – 25:03	2–1
Katajamäki (Zielińska, Viitasuo) – PP – 37:45	3–1
Holopainen (Vesa) – PP – 38:08	4–1
Holopainen (Rakkolainen) – PP – 46:43	5–1
Laitinen (Vesa) – EN – 53:00	6–1
	6–2	54:08 – Locatelli (Saukkonen)
	6–3	56:36 – Rantamäki (Rozier, Mehtonen)
Vesa (Holopainen) – EN – 57:24	7–3
Vesa (Laitinen) – EN – 58:47	8–3

18 min
Penalties
29 min
31
Shots
28

== Statistics ==
Scoring leaders

The following players led the league in playoff points at the conclusion of playoffs on 24 April 2022.

	Player	Team	GP	G	A	Pts	PIM
1	Elisa Holopainen	K-Espoo	12	19	10	29	14
2	Nelli Laitinen	K-Espoo	10	8	13	21	8
3	Michaela Pejzlová	HIFK	12	10	7	17	2
4	Emmi Rakkolainen	K-Espoo	12	4	11	15	25
5	Kiira Yrjänen	K-Espoo	12	5	9	14	8
6	Tinja-Mariia Haukijärvi	K-Espoo	12	5	7	12	6
7	Estelle Duvin	TPS	7	7	4	11	6
8	Sanni Rantala	K-Espoo	11	2	9	11	0
9	Anna-Kaisa Antti-Roiko	Kärpät	7	6	4	10	16
10	Julia Liikala	HIFK	12	6	4	10	4
11	Matilda Nilsson	HIFK	12	5	5	10	6
12	Emilia Vesa	K-Espoo	12	3	7	10	4
13	Athena Locatelli	HIFK	12	5	4	9	6
14	Karoliina Rantamäki	HIFK	12	3	6	9	27
15	Ella Viitasuo	K-Espoo	12	2	7	9	4

Leading goaltenders

The following goaltenders had played at least one playoff match at the conclusion of the playoffs on 24 April 2022, sorted by save percentage.

Team eliminated in quarterfinals

	Player	Team	GP	TOI	W	L	SA	GA	SO	SV%	GAA
1	Kassidy Sauvé	HPK	4	236:10	1	3	190	9	0	.955	2.29
2	Anni Keisala	Ilves	3	175:33	0	3	105	7	0	.938	2.39
3	Tiia Pajarinen	K-Espoo	11	656:37	9	2	261	20	3	.929	1.83
4	Johanna Oksman	Kärpät	1	60:00	1	0	26	2	0	.929	2.00
5	Tiina Ranne	KalPa	4	235:51	1	3	243	22	0	.917	5.60
6	Iina Kuusela	HIFK	12	713:56	8	4	310	30	2	.912	2.52
7	Kati Asikainen	Kärpät	6	361:39	3	3	186	19	0	.907	3.15
8	Mila Houni	TPS	7	429:26	3	4	212	24	0	.898	3.35
9	Hannele Tarkiainen	Kuortane	3	176:14	0	3	112	14	0	.889	4.77
10	Minja Drufva	K-Espoo	2	60:43	0	1	15	3	0	.833	2.96
