= 2021 Aurora Borealis Cup playoffs =

Finnish Championship tournament in women's ice hockey, 38th edition

Naisten Liiga pudotuspelit 2021 (Finnish) 2021 Naisten Liiga playoffs

Tournament details
- Dates: 3–25 March 2021
- Format: Best-of
- Teams: 8
- Defending champions: Kiekko-Espoo

Final positions
- Champions: Kiekko-Espoo (15th title)
- Runner-up: KalPa Kuopio
- Third place: HIFK Helsinki
- Fourth place: Ilves Tampere

Tournament statistics
- Scoring leader(s): Elisa Holopainen (KalPa) (16 points)

Awards
- MVP: Tiia Pajarinen

The 2021 Aurora Borealis Cup playoffs or the 2021 Naisten Liiga playoffs (Finnish: Naisten Liiga pudotuspelit 2021) was the playoff tournament of the 2020–21 Naisten Liiga season. The Naisten Liiga playoffs began on 3 March and the Aurora Borealis Cup was awarded to Kiekko-Espoo, the 38th Finnish Champion in women's ice hockey, on 25 March.

== Playoff bracket ==
International travel restrictions and quarantine protocols due to the COVID-19 pandemic necessitated extended travel schedules for national teams competing in the 2021 IIHF Women's World Championship, originally scheduled to begin on 4 April 2021, and the Naisten Liiga playoff structure was modified to conclude a week earlier than expected to accommodate a training camp within the quarantine period for the Finnish national team. On 27 February, it was announced that, in order to name the Finnish Champion by 27 March at the latest, the quarterfinal series were to be reduced from the standard best-of-five system to best-of-three. The best-of-five semifinals and finals and the bronze medal match remain unchanged.

In an unexpected twist, on 4 March the International Ice Hockey Federation (IIHF) announced that the 2021 Women's Worlds were to be postponed until 6–16 May 2021. As the first games of the Naisten Liiga quarterfinals had already been played the day before, the playoff structure announced on 27 February remained in place following announcement of the postponement.

Quarterfinals
1	Kiekko-Espoo	2
8	Team Kuortane	0
4	Ilves Tampere	2
5	HPK Hämeenlinna	0
2	KalPa Kuopio	2
7	Kärpät Oulu	0
3	HIFK Helsinki	2
6	TPS Turku	0

Semifinals
1	Kiekko-Espoo	3
4	Ilves Tampere	1
2	KalPa Kuopio	3
3	HIFK Helsinki	2

Finals
1st place, gold medalist(s)	Kiekko-Espoo	3
2nd place, silver medalist(s)	KalPa Kuopio	1
Bronze medal game
3rd place, bronze medalist(s)	HIFK Helsinki	2
4	Ilves Tampere	1

== Quarterfinals ==
The best-of-three quarterfinals (Finnish: Puolivälierät) began on 3 March 2021 and were scheduled to be continued on 6 March with a third 7 March, if necessary. Home ice advantage was granted to the higher seeded teams for the first and potential third games. Each of the four quarterfinal series concluded in two game sweeps in favor of the higher seeded teams.

=== (1) Kiekko-Espoo vs. (8) Team Kuortane ===
Kiekko-Espoo earned the first seed after winning the regular season title with 2.41 points per game, marking the team's third consecutive regular season victory, and finished with 65 points in 27 games. Team Kuortane defeated RoKi Rovaniemi in the last game on the last day of the season to claim second place in the lower division series and secure the eighth seed. The teams last met in the 2019–20 Aurora Borealis Cup semifinals, which Kiekko-Espoo won in three games. They faced one another only once during the 2020–21 season, a 5–3 victory for Kiekko-Espoo on 14 November 2020.

Game times in Eastern European Time (UTC+02:00)

3 March 2021; 19:05	Kiekko-Espoo	4–2 (2–2, 2–0, 0–0)	Team Kuortane	Tapiolan harjoitusareena, Espoo

Game reference

Tiia Parjarinen
Goalies
Emilia Kyrkkö
Referee:
Henna Åberg
Linesmen:
Salla-Maaria Raitala
Julia Haiminen

Vesa (Rajahuhta, Laitinen) – 5:13	1–0
	1–1	7:50 – Sundelin (Vartiainen)
	1–2	16:10 – Kaila (Tervonen)
Rajahuhta (Rakkolainen) – 19:50	2–2
Rajahuhta – 37:18	3–2
Vesa (Rajahuhta, Rakkolainen) – 37:48	4–2

2 min
Penalties
6 min
51
Shots
21

6 March 2021; 15:30	Team Kuortane	0–6	Kiekko-Espoo	Kuortaneen jäähalli, Kuortane

Game reference

Aino Laitinen
Emilia Kyrkkö
Goalies
Tiia Pajarinen
Referee:
Henna Åberg
Linesmen:
Kristian Ouri
Anssi Mutka

0-1	16:38 – Vesa (Leinonen) (SH)
0-2	35:57 – Rajahuhta (Rakkolainen, Laitinen)
0-3	37:22 – Rakkolainen (Vesa, Laitinen)
0-4	42:42 – Viitasuo (Vesa, Villilä) (PP)
0-5	44:34 – Viitasuo (S. Nuutinen) (PP)
0-6	51:40 – Haukijärvi (Katjamäki, Vesa)

29 min
Penalties
4 min
25
Shots
42

=== (2) KalPa vs. (7) Kärpät ===
KalPa Kuopio secured the second seed after completing the regular season with 2.24 points per game (56 points in 25 games), propelled by the elite production of forwards Elisa Holopainen, who scored 32 goals and 22 assists (54 points) in 18 games of the qualifiers to rank first in every scoring metric of the series, and Matilda Nilsson, the regular season goal scoring champion, who tallied 8 goals in 7 regular season (upper division) games. Kärpät Oulu topped the lower division standings to secure the seventh seed with 24 points in 10 games. The teams last met in the 2019–20 Aurora Borealis Cup semifinals, which Kiekko-Espoo won in three games. KalPa won both games in this season's series during the Naisten Liiga qualifiers.

Game times in Eastern European Time (UTC+02:00)

3 March 2021; 18:30	KalPa Kuopio	3–2 (2–1, 1–0, 0–1)	Kärpät Oulu	Niiralan Monttu, Kuopio

Game reference

Tiina Ranne
Goalies
Johanna Oksman
Referee:
Sini Kauhanen
Linesmen:
Santeri Smahl
Joonas Heinonen

	0-1	9:34 – Antti-Roiko (Rahunen, Keränen)
Holopainen (Saari) – 12:54	1-1
Rantanen (Koljonen, Juutilainen) – 19:25	2-1
Niskanen (Koljonen, Holopainen) – 36:14	3-1
	3-2	55:47 – Kaijankoski (Antti-Roiko, Nousiainen) (PP)

8 min
Penalties
2 min
20
Shots
24

6 March 2021; 12:30	Kärpät Oulu	4–5 (0-2, 1-1, 3-1, 0-1)	KalPa Kuopio	Raksilan jäähalli, Oulu

Game reference

Johanna Oksman
Goalies
Tiina Ranne
Referee:
Johanna Tauriainen
Linesmen:
Linnea Sainio
Jonne Mustonen

	0-1	2:57 – Holopainen (Niskanen, Saari)
	0-2	11:44 – Saari (Holopainen, Niskanen)
	0-3	21:53 – Mäkelä (Holopainen, Niskanen) (PP)
Kaijankoski (Karjalainen, Havana) (PP) – 34:34	1-3
Karjalainen (Nousiainen, Antti-Roiko) (PP) – 41:54	2-3
Havana (Karjalainen) – 48:02	3-3
Sarkkinen Mata (Antti-Roiko) (DP) – 56:11	4-3
	4-4	57:58 – Holopainen (Niskanen, Juutilainen) (PP)
	4-5	69:47 – Mäkelä (Juutilainen, Saari) (PP)

32 min
Penalties
12 min
31
Shots
29

=== (3) HIFK vs. (6) TPS ===
Having gained promotion to the Naisten Liiga just two seasons prior, HIFK Helsinki continued their meteoric rise to finish third in the regular season with 2.11 points per game (57 points in 27 games). TPS Turku concluded the season with 1.44 points per game (39 points in 27 games) to finish sixth in the regular season and secure the team's first appearance in the playoffs – an impressive return after narrowly avoiding relegation in the previous season. HIFK won three of four matchups during the 2020–21 season. HIFK forward Michaela Pejzlová, the regular season scoring champion, scored 9 points in the season series with TPS.

Game times in Eastern European Time (UTC+02:00)

3 March 2021; 19:00	HIFK Helsinki	3–0 (2-0, 1-0, 0-0)	TPS Turku	Malmin jäähalli, Helsinki

Game reference

Iina Kuusela
Goalies
Isabella Laiho
Referee:
Henna-Maria Koivuluoma
Linesmen:
Jenni Heikkinen
Helinä Anttila

Passard (Pejzlová, Rantamäki) (PP) – 2:15	1-0
Rantamäki (Pejzlová, Mäkelä) – 3:20	2-0
Mäkelä (Pejzlová) – 25:53	3-0

20 min
Penalties
2 min
27
Shots
24

6 March 2021; 13:20	TPS Turku	2–4 (0-1, 0-1, 2-2)	HIFK Helsinki	Kupittaan jäähalli, Turku

Game reference

Isabella Laiho
Goalies
Iina Kuusela
Referee:
Kaisa Ketonen
Linesmen:
Johanna Oksanen
Jenni Jaatinen

	0-1	17:55 – Passard (Rozier, Pejzlová) (PP)
	0-2	33:21 – Passard
	0-3	42:57 – Juusela (Passard, Kemppainen)
	0-4	57:15 – Rozier (Pejzlová) (SH, EN)
Heikkinen (Otamo, Serdar) (NG) – 58:51	1-4
Serdar (Vuorenmaa, Robinson) (NG) – 59:36	2-4

24 min
Penalties
10 min
30
Shots
35

=== (4) Ilves vs. (5) HPK ===
Ilves Tampere earned the fourth seed after finishing the season with 47 points in 28 games for a 1.68 points percentage and HPK Hämeenlinna earned the fifth seed after finishing the season with 46 points in 29 games for a 1.59 points percentage. This was the first quarterfinal match-up between the two teams since 2015 and their fourth playoff match-up in ten seasons. HPK won two of the three previous series, including defeating Ilves in the 2011 Aurora Borealis Cup final. HPK won three of four games in this year's season series.

Game times in Eastern European Time (UTC+02:00)

3 March 2021; 19:15	Ilves Tampere	1–0 (1-0, 0-0, 0-0)	HPK Hämeenlinna	Tesoman jäähalli, Tampere

Game reference
Anni Keisala	Goalies	Meeri Räisänen	Referee: Anniina Nurmi; Linesmen: Tiina Saarimäki; Reetta-Kaisa Lusi
Suokko (Jokikokko, Vanhanen) – 2:48 / 1-0			Referee: Anniina Nurmi; Linesmen: Tiina Saarimäki; Reetta-Kaisa Lusi
6 min	Penalties	18 min	Referee: Anniina Nurmi; Linesmen: Tiina Saarimäki; Reetta-Kaisa Lusi
23	Shots	27	Referee: Anniina Nurmi; Linesmen: Tiina Saarimäki; Reetta-Kaisa Lusi

6 March 2021; 14:00	HPK Hämeenlinna	0–2 (0-0, 0-0, 0-2)	Ilves Tampere	Jääliikuntakeskus Hakio, Hämeenlinna

Game reference
Meeri Räisänen	Goalies	Anni Keisala	Referee: Anniina Nurmi; Linesmen: Tiina Saarimäki; Reetta-Kaisa Lusi
0-1 / 56:39 – Vanhanen (Varpula, Suokko); 0-2 / 59:37 – Suokko (Kilponen) (EN)			Referee: Anniina Nurmi; Linesmen: Tiina Saarimäki; Reetta-Kaisa Lusi
6 min	Penalties	8 min	Referee: Anniina Nurmi; Linesmen: Tiina Saarimäki; Reetta-Kaisa Lusi
38	Shots	31	Referee: Anniina Nurmi; Linesmen: Tiina Saarimäki; Reetta-Kaisa Lusi

== Semifinals ==
=== (1) Kiekko-Espoo vs. (4) Ilves ===
Game times in Eastern European Time (UTC+02:00)

9 March 2021; 19:05	Kiekko-Espoo	2–0 (0-0, 1-0, 1-0)	Ilves Tampere	Tapiolan harjoitusareena, Espoo

Game reference
Tiia Pajarinen	Goalies	Anni Keisala	Referee: Henna-Maria Koivuluoma; Linesmen: Jenni Heikkinen; Helinä Anttila
Haukijärvi (S. Nuutinen) – 34:16 / 1-0; Vesa (Rakkolainen, Laitinen) (PP) – 42:44 / 2-0			Referee: Henna-Maria Koivuluoma; Linesmen: Jenni Heikkinen; Helinä Anttila
6 min	Penalties	6 min	Referee: Henna-Maria Koivuluoma; Linesmen: Jenni Heikkinen; Helinä Anttila
33	Shots	17	Referee: Henna-Maria Koivuluoma; Linesmen: Jenni Heikkinen; Helinä Anttila

11 March 2021; 19:15	Ilves Tampere	0–2 (0-2, 0-0, 0-0)	Kiekko-Espoo	Tesoman jäähalli, Tampere

Game reference
Anni Keisala	Goalies	Tiia Pajarinen	Referee: Anniina Nurmi; Linesmen: Tiina Saarimäki; Reetta-Kaisa Lusi
0-1 / 03:05 – Rajahuhta (Vesa, Laitinen) (PP); 0-2 / 17:36 – Rakkolainen (Rajahuhta, Laitinen) (PP)			Referee: Anniina Nurmi; Linesmen: Tiina Saarimäki; Reetta-Kaisa Lusi
10 min	Penalties	6 min	Referee: Anniina Nurmi; Linesmen: Tiina Saarimäki; Reetta-Kaisa Lusi
26	Shots	40	Referee: Anniina Nurmi; Linesmen: Tiina Saarimäki; Reetta-Kaisa Lusi

13 March 2021; 17:45	Kiekko-Espoo	2–3 GWS (1-0, 1-2, 0-0) (OT: 0-0) (SO: 1-0)	Ilves Tampere	Tapiolan harjoitusareena, Espoo

Game reference

Tiia Pajarinen
Goalies
Anni Keisala
Referee:
Henna-Maria Koivuluoma
Linesmen:
Helinä Anttila
Jenni Heikkinen

Haukijärvi (Katjamäki) – 08:57	1-0
	1-1	29:15 – Rouhiainen (Jokikokko)
	1-2	29:34 – Varpula (Puputti)
Katjamäki (Viitasuo, Leinonen) – 30:17	2-2

Laitinen (miss)
Vesa (miss)
Rajahuhta (miss)
Haukijärvi (miss)
Rakkolainen
Rakkolainen (miss)
Shootout
(miss) Riipinen
Vanhanen
(miss) Varpula
(miss) Kilponen
(miss) Suokko
Kilponen
18 min
Penalties
4 min
49
Shots
28

14 March 2021; 12:15	Ilves Tampere	1–2 (1-0, 0-1, 0-1)	Kiekko-Espoo	Tesoman jäähalli, Tampere

Game reference

Anni Keisala
Goalies
Tiia Pajarinen
Referee:
Henna-Maria Koivuluoma
Linesmen:
Johanna Oksanen
Jenni Jaatinen

Puputti (Rouhiainen) – 08:51	1-0
	1-1	23:15 – Leinonen (Haukijärvi, Katajamäki)
	1-2	50:01 – S. Nuutinen (Haukijärvi)

2 min
Penalties
2 min
15
Shots
39

=== (2) KalPa vs. (3) HIFK ===
Game times in Eastern European Time (UTC+02:00)

9 March 2021; 13:00	KalPa Kuopio	3–7 (1-3, 2-2, 0-2)	HIFK Helsinki	Niiralan Monttu, Kuopio

Game reference

Tiina Ranne
Goalies
Iina Kuusela
Referee:
Johanna Tauriainen
Linesmen:
Linnea Sainio
Aino Härkönen

Kastikainen (Koljonen, Nilsson) – 04:09	1-0
	1-1	14:58 – Kemppainen (Parkkonen, Yrjölä)
	1-2	16:55 – PP – Mäkelä (Yrjölä, Parkkonen)
	1-3	18:37 – Pasanen (Virtanen, Locatelli)
Niskanen (Holopainen, Nilsson) – 28:45	2-3
	2-4	29:05 – Pasanen (Yrjölä)
Holopainen (Niskanen) – 30:17	3-4
	3-5	31:01 – Pejzlová (Rozier, Lamminaho)
	3-6	49:14 – Mäkelä (Yrjölä, Mehtonen)
	3-7	58:32 – EN – Parkkonen

8 min
Penalties
8 min
33
Shots
28

11 March 2021; 19:15	HIFK Helsinki	5–2 (1-0, 2-0, 2-2)	KalPa Kuopio	Malmin jäähalli, Helsinki

Game reference

Iina Kuusela
Goalies
Tiina Ranne
Referee:
Henna Åberg
Linesmen:
Johanna Oksanen
Jenni Jaatinen

Rozier – SH – 13:47	1-0
Mäkelä (Rantamäki, Pejzlová) – 25:06	2-0
Passard (Rozier) – 35:21	3-0
Mäkelä (Locatelli, Parkkonen) – 53:35	4-0
	4-1	54:51 – NG – Nilsson (Holopainen, Niskanen)
	4-2	55:24 – NG – Holopainen (Niskanen)
Pejzlová – EN – 57:52	5-2

4 min
Penalties
4 min
33
Shots
29

13 March 2021; 12:00	KalPa Kuopio	6–2 (2-2, 1-0, 3-0)	HIFK Helsinki	Niiralan Monttu, Kuopio

Game reference

Tiina Ranne
Goalies
Iina Kuusela
Referee:
Johanna Tauriainen
Linesmen:
Jenna Puhakka
Linnea Sainio

	0-1	03:20 – Passard (Juusela, Locatelli)
Nilsson (Juutilainen) – 03:45	1-1
	1-2	05:05 – PP – Rozier (Rantamäki)
Katajisto (Rantanen, Lappi) – 8:52	2-2
Holopainen (Niskanen) – 32:58	3-2
Niskanen (Saari, Koljonen) – 45:11	4-2
Nilsson (Kastikainen, Juutilainen) – 57:01	5-2
Holopainen – EN – 58:12	6-2

20 min
Penalties
10 min
30
Shots
20

14 March 2021; 16:00	HIFK Helsinki	1–3 (0-0, 1-2, 0-1)	KalPa Kuopio	Malmin jäähalli, Helsinki

Game reference

Iina Kuusela
Goalies
Tiina Ranne
Referee:
Anniina Nurmi
Linesmen:
Tiina Saarimäki
Salla-Maaria Raitala

	0-1	22:33 – Rantanen (Kastikainen)
Mäkelä (Kemppainen) – 36:48	1-1
	1-2	37:54 – PP – Saari (Holopainen, Niskanen)
	1-3	59:59 – EN – Holopainen

12 min
Penalties
20 min
30
Shots
29

17 March 2021; 18:30	KalPa Kuopio	3–1 (0-0, 2-0, 1-1)	HIFK Helsinki	Niiralan Monttu, Kuopio

Game reference

Tinna Ranne
Goalies
Iina Kuusela
Referee:
Johanna Tauriainen
Linesmen:
Linnea Sainio
Jenna Puhakka

Ritari (Saari) – SH – 25:53	1-0
Saari (Niskanen, Juutilainen) – PP – 31:27	2-0
	2-1	52:20 – PP – Pejzlová (Mäkelä)
Holopainen – 55:42	3-1

8 min
Penalties
18 min
31
Shots
34

== Bronze medal game ==
March 20, 2021; 15:30	HIFK Helsinki	2–1 (2-1, 0-0, 0-0)	Ilves Tampere	Malmin jäähalli, Helsinki

Game reference

Iina Kuusela
Goalies
Anni Keisala
Referee:
Henna Åberg
Linesmen:
Johanna Oksanen
Jenni Jaatinen

Rantamäki (Pejzlová, Mäkelä) – 00:22	1-0
	1-1	02:12 – Varpula
Mäkelä (Rantamäki, Parkkonen) – 18:22	2-1

4 min
Penalties
4 min
25
Shots
19

== Finals ==
Game times in Eastern European Time (UTC+02:00)

20 March 2021; 12:45	Kiekko-Espoo	2–0 (1-0, 1-0, 0-0)	KalPa Kuopio	Tapiolan harjoitusareena, Espoo

Game reference
Tiia Pajarinen	Goalies	Tiina Ranne	Referee: Anniina Nurmi; Linesmen: Tiina Saarimäki; Jenni Heikkinen
Laitinen (Leinonen, Rajahuhta) (PP) – 13:34 / 1–0; Haukijärvi (S. Nuutinen) – 25:51 / 2-0			Referee: Anniina Nurmi; Linesmen: Tiina Saarimäki; Jenni Heikkinen
60 min	Penalties	8 min	Referee: Anniina Nurmi; Linesmen: Tiina Saarimäki; Jenni Heikkinen
37	Shots	41	Referee: Anniina Nurmi; Linesmen: Tiina Saarimäki; Jenni Heikkinen

21 March 2021; 13:30	KalPa Kuopio	0–2 (0-0, 0-1, 0-1)	Kiekko-Espoo	Niiralan Monttu, Kuopio

Game reference
Tiina Ranne	Goalies	Tiia Pajarinen	Referee: Johanna Tauriainen; Linesmen: Linnea Sainio; Jenna Puhakka
0-1 / 35:23 – PP – Leinonen (Aro, Rajahuhta); 0-2 / 57:02 – Katjamäki (S. Nuutinen, Haukijärvi)			Referee: Johanna Tauriainen; Linesmen: Linnea Sainio; Jenna Puhakka
4 min	Penalties	8 min	Referee: Johanna Tauriainen; Linesmen: Linnea Sainio; Jenna Puhakka
31	Shots	35	Referee: Johanna Tauriainen; Linesmen: Linnea Sainio; Jenna Puhakka

23 March 2021; 18:45	Kiekko-Espoo	2–5 (0-4, 2-1, 0-0)	KalPa Kuopio	Tapiolan harjoitusareena, Espoo

Game reference

Tiia Pajarinen
Erika Jaskari
Goalies
Tiina Ranne
Referee:
Annina Nurmi
Linesmen:
Tiina Saarimäki
Jenni Heikkinen

	0-1	00:41 – PP – Niskanen (Holopainen)
	0-2	08:16 – Katajisto (Juutilainen, Mäkelä)
	0-3	08:39 – Niskanen (Saari, Holopainen)
	0-4	14:44 – Holopainen (Nilsson)
	0-5	22:56 – PP – Holopainen
Haukijärvi (Viitasuo) – PP – 32:11	1-5
Katjamäki (Viitasuo, Villilä) – 33:23	2-5

14 min
Penalties
8 min
28
Shots
23

25 March 2021; 18:30	KalPa Kuopio	2–3 (0-1, 0-1, 2-1)	Kiekko-Espoo	Niiralan Monttu, Kuopio

Game reference

Tiina Ranne
Goalies
Tiia Pajarinen
Referee:
Johanna Tauriainen
Linesmen:
Linnea Sainio
Jenna Puhakka

	0-1	00:58 – Viitasuo (Villilä, Vesa)
	0-2	31:50 – PP – S. Nuutinen
Holopainen – PS – 40:30	1-2
Niskanen (Saari, Holopainen) – PP – 53:08	2-2
	2-3	56:33 – Rajahuhta

12 min
Penalties
16 min
35
Shots
31

== Statistics ==
Scoring leaders

The following players were led the league in playoff points at the conclusion of the playoffs on 25 March 2021.

	Player	Team	GP	G	A	Pts	PIM
1	Elisa Holopainen	KalPa	11	12	9	21	6
2	Tanja Niskanen	KalPa	11	6	10	16	14
3	Miressa Mäkelä	HIFK	8	7	3	10	2
4	Annina Rajahuhta	K-Espoo	10	5	5	10	8
5	Michaela Pejzlová	HIFK	8	3	7	10	8
6	Saila Saari	KalPa	11	3	7	10	4
7	Emilia Vesa	K-Espoo	10	4	5	9	27
8	Tinja-Mariia Haukijärvi	K-Espoo	10	5	3	8	4
9	Nelli Laitinen	K-Espoo	10	1	6	7	6
10	Johanna Juutilainen	KalPa	11	0	7	7	2
11	Emmanuelle Passard	HIFK	8	5	1	6	8

Leading goaltenders

The following goaltenders lead the league in playoff save percentage at the conclusion of the playoffs on 25 March 2021, while playing at least one third of matches.

	Player	Team	GP	TOI	W	L	SA	GA	SO	SV%	GA60
1	Meeri Räisänen	HPK	2	117:30	0	2	54	2	0	.964	1.02
2	Anni Keisala	Ilves	7	436:27	2	4	251	10	2	.962	1.37
3	Tiia Pajarinen	K-Espoo	10	588:19	8	1	250	10	5	.962	1.02
4	Emilia Kyrkkö	Kuortane	2	74:56	0	1	64	5	0	.928	4.00
5	Iina Kuusela	HIFK	8	476:08	5	3	225	18	1	.926	2.27
6	Tiina Ranne	KalPa	11	659:11	6	5	331	29	0	.919	2.64
7	Isabella Laiho	TPS	2	115:11	0	2	62	6	0	.912	3.13
8	Johanna Oksman	Kärpät	2	127:35	0	2	49	8	0	.860	3.76
9	Aino Laitinen	Kuortane	2	44:34	0	1	29	5	0	.853	6.73
