= Tiia Pajarinen =

Finnish ice hockey player (born 1998)

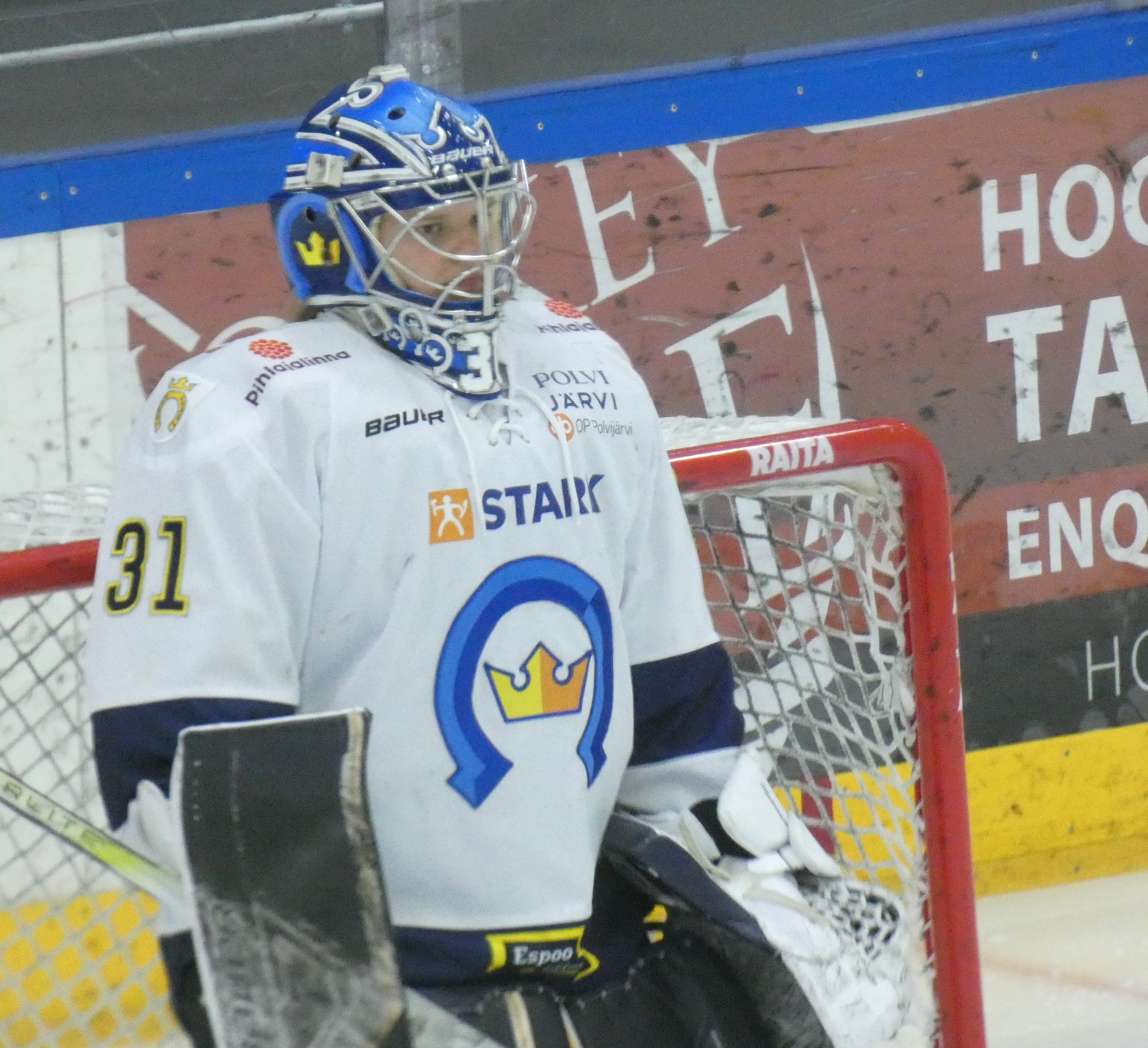
- Pajarinen with Kiekko-Espoo in 2023
- Born: 17 April 1998 (age 28) Polvijärvi, Finland
- Height: 1.66 m (5 ft 5 in)
- Weight: 65 kg (143 lb; 10 st 3 lb)
- Position: Goaltender
- Catches: Left
- Auroraliiga team Former teams: Kiekko-Espoo; Vaasan Sport; Team Kuortane
- National team: Finland
- Playing career: 2010–present
Medal record
World Championship
Bronze medal – third place	2024 United States

Tiia Pajarinen (born 17 April 1998) is a Finnish ice hockey goaltender and member of the Finnish national team. She plays in the Auroraliiga with Kiekko-Espoo.

== Playing career ==
Pajarinen began playing ice hockey with boys' teams in the minor ice hockey department of Polvijärven Urheilijat (PoU) in her hometown of Polvijärvi. Her earliest seasons were spent as a skater but she soon became interested in goaltending and moved to the net.

She made her senior league debut in the 2010–11 season of the Naisten Suomi-sarja with the women's team of Outokummun Kiekko (OoKoo), a junior club based in the nearby town of Outokumpu, and continued to play with the team through the 2012–13 season. During that period, she also played with youth and women's teams of Joensuun Kiekko-Pojat (Jokipojat) in the city of Joensuu.

=== Naisten Liiga ===
==== Team Kuortane ====
Motivated by a desire to train full-time alongside her secondary school studies, Pajarinen moved 380 km (240 mi) from home to enroll at Kuortaneen urheilulukio and join Team Kuortane. She made her Naisten SM-sarja (NSMs; renamed Naisten Liiga in 2017) debut with Team Kuortane in the 2015–16 season, during which she was the team's second goaltender behind starter Anni Keisala and played eleven games, recorded a steady .905 save percentage.

Pajarinen served as Team Kuortane's starting net minder during the following two seasons, improving to an excellent .929 save percentage across fourteen games in the 2016–17 season and .933 save percentage across fourteen games in the 2017–18 season – her save percentage ranked fourth in the league of all goaltenders playing more than one-third of their team's minutes in 2016–17 and third in 2017–18.

Her career with Team Kuortane culminated with her backstopping the team to a Finnish Championship (SM) bronze medal victory in the 2018 Aurora Borealis Cup championships. Pajarinen played a pivotal role in securing the first SM medal in team history, posting the best save percentage (.949) and goals against average (1.50) of all playoff goaltenders. During her three seasons with Team Kuortane under head coach Jari Risku, Pajarinen's teammates included national team players Sini Karjalainen, Anni Keisala, Petra Nieminen, Jenniina Nylund, Eve Savander, Sara Säkkinen, Viivi Vainikka, Emilia Vesa, and Kiira Yrjänen, among many other young stars of Finnish ice hockey.

==== Vaasan Sport ====
After completing her secondary school studies in 2018, Pajarinen signed with Vaasan Sport for the 2018–19 Naisten Liiga season. The team had gained promotion from the Naisten Mestis in the 2018 postseason and Pajarinen represented a necessary upgrade in net ahead of Sport's debut in the Naisten Liiga.

Sport struggled with the level of play in the Naisten Liiga and the demands placed on Pajarinen were increased in comparison to her seasons with Team Kuortane as a result. She played in 22 games, faced 735 shots, had a 10-12 win-loss record, and recorded a career-high 3.21 GAA but, in spite of the increased workload and losing game record, was able to maintain a reliable .907 save percentage on the season.

==== Kiekko-Espoo ====
Following the challenging season in Vasaa, Pajarinen signed with Kiekko-Espoo in April 2019. The team made it to the Aurora Borealis Cup finals before the last round of the playoffs was cancelled due to the COVID-19 pandemic.

The following season, Pajarinen backstopped Kiekko-Espoo in a victorious Aurora Borealis Cup run, posting two shutouts in three games of the finals. Her consistent play earned her the Karoliina Rantamäki Award as MVP of 2021 Naisten Liiga playoffs.

== International play ==
As a junior player with the Finnish national under-18 team, Pajarinen participated in the 2016 IIHF World Women's U18 Championship in St. Catharines, Canada. She was in net for in three of Finland's five games during the tournament, claiming victories against France and Sweden, and posted the second-best save percentage and goals against average of all tournament goaltenders playing more than forty percent of their team's total minutes, with a .933 save percentage and 1.34 GAA. Her excellent performance was recognized with selection as a top-three player for Finland by the coaches.

Pajarinen made her debut with the senior national team in November 2022 at the first tournament of the 2022–23 Euro Hockey Tour season, a 5-Nations Tournament in Vierumäki, Finland. In Finland's match against Switzerland, she recorded a shutout.

She next appeared with the senior national team during the 2023–24 Euro Hockey Tour season, during which Pajarinen recorded three shutouts across four games. Her victories included a shutout against Sweden at the 3-Nations Tournament in Vierumäki, a shutout against Denmark at the Deutschland Cup in Landshut, and a shutout against Germany at the EHT Finals in Liberec.

Pajarinen was named to the Finnish roster for the 2024 IIHF Women's World Championship as the team's third goalie behind starters Anni Keisala and Sanni Ahola.

== Personal life ==
Pajarinen is a self-described "24/7 hockey player" who spends most of her time playing, watching, or thinking about ice hockey. Other favorite activities include frisbee golf and badminton.

She has named Pekka Rinne as a goaltender she admired and tried to emulate throughout her youth.

== Career statistics ==
Note: Blank cells indicate missing statistics.

=== Regular season and playoffs ===
			Regular season								Playoffs
Season	Team	League	GP	W	L	Min	GA	SO	S%	GAA	GP	W	L	Min	GA	SO	S%	GAA
2010-11	OoKoo	N. Suomi-sarja	3	2	0	135:00	3	2	.949	1.33	–	–	–	–	–	–	–	–
2011-12	OoKoo	N. Suomi-sarja	1	1	0	60:00	0	1	1.00	0.00	5	0	5	299:00	34	0	.875	6.84
2012-13	OoKoo	N. Suomi-sarja	8	3	4	479:00	25	0	.929	3.13	–	–	–	–	–	–	–	–
2013-14	OoKoo	N. Suomi-sarja
2014-15	Jokipo Ladies	N. Mestis	1	1	0	60:00	0	1	1.00	0.00	–	–	–	–	–	–	–	–
2015-16	Team Kuortane	NSMs	11	2	8	668:44	38	1	.905	3.41	0	–	–	0:00	–	–	–	–
2016-17	Team Kuortane	NSMs	14	6	5	814:15	31	0	.929	2.28	2	0	2	129:53	7	0	.900	3.23
2016-17	Sport (L)	N. Mestis	1	1	0	42:26	1	0	.941	1.41	–	–	–	–	–	–	–	–
2017-18	Team Kuortane	NSML	14	7	5	807:57	28	5	.933	2.08	8	5	1	518:29	13	2	.949	1.50
2018-19	Sport	NSML	22	10	12	1271:41	68	2	.907	3.21	–	–	–	–	–	–	–	–
2018-19	Hermes (L)	N. Mestis	4	0	4	206:40	10	0	.920	2.90	–	–	–	–	–	–	–	–
2019-20	Kiekko-Espoo	NSML	18	11	6	1031:12	38	2	.907	2.21	5	5	0	300:00	10	0	.914	2.00
2020-21	Kiekko-Espoo	NSML	16	11	2	897:17	29	4	.910	1.94	10	8	1	588:19	10	5	.962	1.02
2021-22	Kiekko-Espoo	NSML	18	16	2	1037:42	27	4	.936	1.56	11	9	2	656:37	20	3	.929	1.83
2022-23	Kiekko-Espoo	NSML	21	13	6	1229:49	34	5	.921	1.66	10	6	4	586:27	22	2	.897	2.25
2023-24	Kiekko-Espoo	NSML	16	10	4	950:45	33	5	.912	2.08	9	6	3	534:20	14	3	.914	1.57
Naisten Liiga totals			150	86	50	8709:22	326	28	.918	2.25	55	34	12	2921	96	15	.929	1.74

=== International ===
Year	Team	Event	Result	GP	W	L	MIN	GA	SO	SV%	GAA
2016	Finland U18	WC18	6th	3	2	1	180:00	4	0	.933	1.34

== Awards and honors ==
Award	Period
International
World U18 Top-3 Player on Team	2016
Naisten Liiga
Finnish Championship Bronze Medal	2018
Aurora Borealis Cup Champion	2021, 2022
Karoliina Rantamäki Award (Playoff MVP)	2021
Finnish Championship Silver Medal	2023, 2024
