= Emmi Rakkolainen =

Finnish ice hockey player

- Born: 9 August 1996 (age 30) Helsinki, Finland
- Height: 176 cm (5 ft 9 in)
- Weight: 62 kg (137 lb; 9 st 11 lb)
- Position: Centre
- Shoots: Left
- SWHL team Former teams: HV71: Kiekko-Espoo; Espoo Blues; KJT Haukat
- National team: Finland
- Playing career: 2013–present

Emmi Rakkolainen (born 9 August 1996) is a Finnish ice hockey player and member of the Finnish national team, currently playing in the Swedish Women's Hockey League (SDHL) with HV71 Dam.

== Playing career ==
Rakkolainen previously served as captain of Kiekko-Espoo Naiset in the Naisten Liiga (NSML).

=== International play ===
Rakkolainen was officially named to the Finnish roster for the 2020 IIHF Women's World Championship on 4 March 2020, prior to the IIHF canceling the tournament on 7 March 2020 in response to public health concerns related to COVID-19. The 2020 World Championship would have been Rakkolainen's debut with the Finnish women's national team at an IIHF-organized international tournament, though she previously represented Finland at select tournaments in the Euro Hockey Tour during the 2018–19 and 2019–20 seasons.

== Career statistics ==
=== International ===
Year	Team	Event	Result	GP	G	A	Pts	PIM
2013	Finland U18	WW18	5th	5	1	2	3	8
2014	Finland U18	WW18	5th	5	2	1	3	2
2022	Finland	WW	6th	7	0	0	0	0
2023	Finland	WW	5th	7	0	0	0	2
Junior totals				10	3	3	6	10
Senior totals				14	0	0	0	2

== Awards and honors ==
Award or honor	Year(s)
Naisten Liiga
Aurora Borealis Cup Champion	2019, 2021, 2022
Player of the Month	November 2019
Student-Athlete of the Year	2021–22
Finnish Championship Silver Medal	2023
