= Sanni Rantala =

Finnish ice hockey player (born 2002)

- Born: 8 July 2002 (age 24) Riihimäki, Finland
- Height: 1.73 m (5 ft 8 in)
- Weight: 63 kg (139 lb; 9 st 13 lb)
- Position: Defense
- Shoots: Right
- SDHL team Former teams: Frölunda HC: KalPa Kuopio; Kiekko-Espoo; Team Kuortane
- National team: Finland
- Playing career: 2017–present
Medal record
Olympic Games
Bronze medal – third place	2022 Beijing	Ice hockey
World Championship
Bronze medal – third place	2024 United States
Bronze medal – third place	2025 Czechia

Sanni Rantala (born 8 July 2002) is a Finnish ice hockey player for Frölunda HC of the Swedish Women's Hockey League (SDHL) and a member of the Finnish national team.

Rantala won bronze medals in the women's ice hockey tournament at the 2022 Winter Olympics in Beijing and at the 2024 IIHF Women's World Championship in Utica, New York.

== Playing career ==
=== Naisten Liiga ===
Rantala made her senior club debut with Team Kuortane in the 2017–18 season of the Finnish Naisten Liiga (NSML). Her rookie season was capped by Team Kuortane winning Finnish Championship (SM) bronze in the 2018 playoffs, the first SM medal in team history.

After four seasons with Team Kuortane, she joined Kiekko-Espoo for the 2021–22 season and won the Aurora Borealis Cup in that season's playoffs. The 2021–22 season marked the first instance of her career in which she averaged more than a point per game (25 points/21 games=1.19) across the regular season and was highlighted by her selection to the Naisten Liiga All-Star First Team.

Ahead of the 2022–23 season, Rantala left Kiekko-Espoo to sign with KalPa. She led all Naisten Liiga defensemen in assists during the 2022–23 regular season, with 32, and was KalPa's top point-scoring defender, notching 39 points in 30 games. In eight games of the 2023 Aurora Borealis Cup playoffs, she contributed two goals and eight assists to KalPa's SM bronze medal-winning effort. Her play earned a second selection to the All-Star First Team.

Rantala was the league's top scoring defenseman in the 2023–24 season, tallying 34 points (13+21) in 30 games, and was selected to the Naisten Liiga All-Star First Team for the third consecutive time.

=== SDHL ===
In early April 2024, Frölunda HC announced the signings of Rantala and KalPa teammate Elisa Holopainen for the 2024–25 SDHL season.

== International play ==
Rantala was officially named to the Finnish roster for the 2020 IIHF Women's World Championship on 4 March 2020, before the tournament was cancelled on 7 March 2020 due to public health concerns related to the COVID-19 pandemic. She appeared on the national team roster for all four of the tournaments of the 2019–20 Euro Hockey Tour.

After a knee injury sustained in a preseason game kept her in rehabilitation and off the ice for the entire 2020–21 season, the 2022 Winter Olympics served as Rantala's senior-level IIHF debut. She played in all seven games and scored two points in the tournament, a goal and an assist, both tallied against the Russian Olympic Committee (ROC) during the group stage. Her eight penalty minutes led all Finnish players in the tournament.

On 2 January 2026, she was named to Finland's roster to compete at the 2026 Winter Olympics.

== Career statistics ==
=== International ===
Year	Team	Event	Result	GP	G	A	Pts	PIM
2018	Finland	U18	5th	5	1	0	1	0
2019	Finland	U18	3rd place, bronze medalist(s)	6	1	1	2	2
2020	Finland	U18	4th	6	2	5	7	2
2022	Finland	OG	3rd place, bronze medalist(s)	7	1	1	2	8
2022	Finland	WC	6th	7	0	4	4	0
2023	Finland	WC	5th	7	0	5	5	4
2024	Finland	WC	3rd place, bronze medalist(s)	7	0	0	0	2
2025	Finland	WC	3rd place, bronze medalist(s)	7	0	0	0	2
2026	Finland	OG	6th	5	0	0	0	2
Junior totals				17	4	6	10	4
Senior totals				40	1	10	11	18

== Awards and honors ==
Award	Year or period
International
World U18 Bronze Medal	2019
World U18 Top-3 Player on Team	2019
World U18 Top-3 Player on Team	2020
World U18 Media All-Star	2020
Olympic Bronze Medal	2022
World Championship Bronze Medal	2024, 2025
Naisten Liiga
Finnish Championship Bronze Medal	2018
Finnish Championship Bronze Medal	2023
Finnish Championship Bronze Medal	2024
All-Star First Team	2021–22
All-Star First Team	2022–23
All-Star First Team	2023–24
Aurora Borealis Cup Champion	2022
