= Emilia Vesa =

Finnish ice hockey player (born 2001)

- Born: 3 January 2001 (age 25) Helsinki, Finland
- Height: 1.77 m (5 ft 10 in)
- Weight: 66 kg (146 lb; 10 st 6 lb)
- Position: Right wing
- Shoots: Right
- SDHL team Former teams: Frölunda HC: HIFK Helsinki; Kiekko-Espoo; Team Kuortane
- National team: Finland
- Playing career: 2016–present
Medal record
Olympic Games
Bronze medal – third place	2022 Beijing	Ice hockey
World Championship
Bronze medal – third place	2021 Canada
Bronze medal – third place	2024 United States
Bronze medal – third place	2025 Czechia

Emilia Vesa (born 3 January 2001) is a Finnish ice hockey winger for Frölunda HC of the Swedish Women's Hockey League (SDHL) and member of the Finnish national ice hockey team.

== International play ==
As a junior player with the Finnish national under-18 team, she participated in the IIHF U18 Women's World Championships in 2017, 2018, and 2019, winning a bronze medal at the 2019 tournament.

Vesa made her senior national team debut at the 2021 IIHF Women's World Championship in Calgary, where she won a bronze medal. Several months later, she won an Olympic bronze medal in the women's ice hockey tournament at the 2022 Winter Olympics in Beijing.

At the 2023 IIHF Women's World Championship, she scored the second-most goals for Finland in a three-way tie with Jenniina Nylund and Viivi Vainikka and tallied just one goal less than Finnish scoring leader Petra Nieminen. Vesa recorded her five goals while playing an average of two fewer minutes per game than Nylund, four fewer than Vainikka, and five fewer than Nieminen.

On 2 January 2026, she was named to Finland's roster to compete at the 2026 Winter Olympics.

== Career statistics ==
=== Regular season and playoffs ===
Note: The Naisten Liiga (NSML) was called the Naisten SM-sarja (NSMs, lit. 'Women's Finnish Championship series') until 2017.

			Regular season					Playoffs
Season	Team	League	GP	G	A	Pts	PIM	GP	G	A	Pts	PIM
2016–17	Team Kuortane	NSMs	28	6	11	17	4	2	1	0	1	0
2017–18	Team Kuortane	NSML	27	5	13	18	4	7	0	1	1	0
2018–19	Team Kuortane	NSML	28	6	15	21	4	4	1	0	1	2
2019–20	Team Kuortane	NSML	30	9	23	32	6	8	4	9	13	2
2020–21	Kiekko-Espoo	NSML	24	15	14	29	12	10	4	5	9	27
2021–22	Kiekko-Espoo	NSML	15	11	11	22	6	12	3	7	10	4
2022–23	HIFK	NSML	28	22	31	53	18	9	7	12	19	0
2023–24	Frölunda HC	SDHL	32	6	17	23	8	8	0	1	1	2
2024–25	Frölunda HC	SDHL	28	4	14	18	29	11	3	1	4	2
Naisten Liiga totals			180	74	118	192	54	52	20	34	54	35
SDHL totals			60	10	31	41	37	19	3	2	5	4

=== International ===
Year	Team	Event	Result	GP	G	A	Pts	PIM
2017	Finland	U18	5th	5	0	3	3	2
2018	Finland	U18	5th	5	0	0	0	0
2019	Finland	U18	3rd place, bronze medalist(s)	6	0	0	0	0
2021	Finland	WC	3rd place, bronze medalist(s)	6	0	0	0	2
2022	Finland	OG	3rd place, bronze medalist(s)	7	0	0	0	0
2022	Finland	WC	6th	7	0	0	0	0
2023	Finland	WC	5th	7	5	1	6	0
2024	Finland	WC	3rd place, bronze medalist(s)	7	0	0	0	0
2025	Finland	WC	3rd place, bronze medalist(s)	7	0	1	1	0
2026	Finland	OG	6th	5	0	1	1	0
Junior totals				16	0	3	3	2
Senior totals				34	5	3	8	2

== Awards and honors ==
Award	Season(s)
International
World U18 Bronze Medal	2019
World Championship Bronze Medal	2021, 2025
Olympic Bronze Medal	2022
Naisten Liiga
Aurora Borealis Cup Bronze Medal	2018
Player of the Month	December 2018
Player of the Month	February 2021
Player of the Month	January 2023
Fair-Play Player	2018–19
Best Plus/Minus	2020–21
Aurora Borealis Cup Champion	2021, 2022, 2023
All-Star Second Team	2020–21
