= Sanni Vanhanen =

Finnish ice hockey player (born 2005)

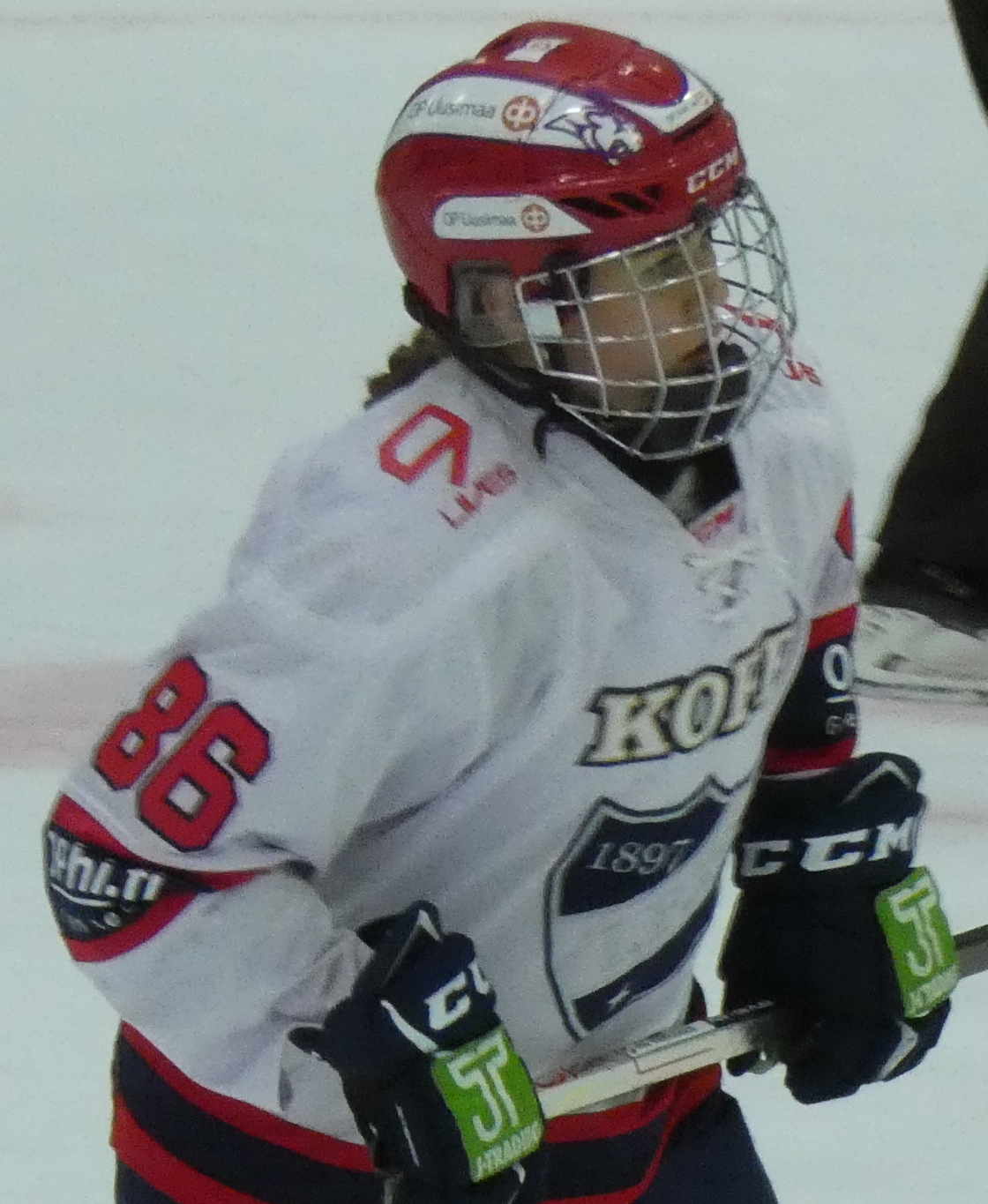
- Vanhanen in 2023
- Born: 1 July 2005 (age 21) Nokia, Finland
- Height: 168 cm (5 ft 6 in)
- Weight: 62 kg (137 lb; 9 st 11 lb)
- Position: Centre
- Shoots: Left
- WCHA team Former teams: Ohio State: IFK Helsinki; Ilves Tampere; Brynäs IF
- National team: Finland
- Playing career: 2019–present
Medal record
Olympic Games
Bronze medal – third place	2022 Beijing	Ice hockey
World Championship
Bronze medal – third place	2021 Canada
Bronze medal – third place	2024 United States
Bronze medal – third place	2025 Czechia

Sanni Vanhanen (born 1 July 2005) is a Finnish ice hockey player for the Ohio State Buckeyes of the National Collegiate Athletic Association (NCAA) and member of the Finnish national team.

Vanhanen was the youngest player to represent Finland at the 2021 IIHF Women's World Championship and was the youngest player to compete in the women's ice hockey tournament at the 2022 Winter Olympics.

== Playing career ==
Vanhanen began playing ice hockey with the youth department of HC Nokia in her hometown of Nokia, in the Pirkanmaa region of southwestern Finland. As HC Nokia did not have a girls' ice hockey section, she played with HC Nokia's top boys' teams for her age. In the 2017–18 season, her last with HC Nokia, she played with the club's boys' teams in the under-12 (U12; E1) AAA league and the U13 (D2) AA and U13 (D2) AAA leagues (see minor ice hockey).

Vanhanen joined the youth department of Tappara hockey club in Tampere, a neighboring municipality some 15 km (9.3 mi) east of Nokia, ahead of the 2018–19 season. Like HC Nokia, Tappara did not have a girls' ice hockey section, and in her first season with the club, she played in the boys' D1 (U14) AAA with Tappara Musta (lit. 'Tappara Black') and also appeared in a few matches as a substitute with Tappara's other D1 AAA team, Tappara Sininen ('Tappara Blue'). In the D1 AAA preliminary series (alkusarja), she ranked sixth of all Tappara Musta players for scoring, with 10 points in 16 games, and tied for third in team assists, with 7. Facing new and more challenging opponents in the regular season (jatkosarja), her scoring was limited to 2 goals and four assists for 6 points in 15 games.

During the 2021–22 season, she played in the U16 SM-sarja with the men's under-16 team of Tappara and on loan with the Tampereen Ilves Naiset in the Naisten Liiga (NSML; rebranded as Auroraliiga in 2024).

She later won two Aurora Borealis Cup championships with IFK Helsinki.

In November 2024, Vanhanen committed to play college ice hockey with the Ohio State Buckeyes women's ice hockey program as an incoming freshman for the 2025–26 season.

== International play ==
Vanhanen participated in the 2019 Women's U16 European Cup, winning silver with the Finnish team. She joined the Finnish national under-18 team in the 2019–20 season, playing in nineteen international matches in addition to competing at the 2020 IIHF U18 Women's World Championship, where Finland finished fourth.

Vanhanen's first invitation to a senior national team training camp was the roster selection camp for the World Championship in March 2021. National team head coach Pasi Mustonen described her as a player with "absolutely tremendous potential" and identified her adaptability as a key attribute that led to her selection.

On 2 January 2026, she was named to Finland's roster to compete at the 2026 Winter Olympics.

== Career statistics ==
=== Regular season and playoffs ===
			Regular season					Playoffs
Season	Team	League	GP	G	A	Pts	PIM	GP	G	A	Pts	PIM
2017–18	HC Nokia Black	U13 AA	6	7	12	19	0	–	–	–	–	–
2017–18	HC Nokia Orange	U13 AAA	25	11	14	25	4	–	–	–	–	–
2018–19	Tappara Black	U14 AAA	31	5	11	16	4	–	–	–	–	–
2018–19	Tappara Blue	U14 AAA	4	0	0	0	0	–	–	–	–	–
2019–20	Tappara Black	U14 AAA	22	8	4	12	2	–	–	–	–	–
2019–20	Tappara Blue	U14 AAA	1	1	1	2	0	–	–	–	–	–
2020–21	Tappara Black	U15 AAA	15	3	6	9	0	–	–	–	–	–
2020–21	Tappara Blue	U15 AAA	1	0	1	1	0	–	–	–	–	–
2020–21	Ilves (L)	NSML	2	2	2	4	0	7	1	1	2	0
2021–22	Tappara Black	U15 AAA	2	0	0	0	0	–	–	–	–	–
2021–22	Tappara U16	U16 SM-sarja	28	5	4	9	2	–	–	–	–	–
2021–22	Ilves (L)	NSML	4	2	1	3	0	–	–	–	–	–
2022–23	HIFK	NSML	22	18	22	40	4	9	12	8	20	0
2023–24	HIFK	NSML	32	27	39	66	12	11	6	8	14	0
2024–25	Brynäs IF	SDHL	35	12	14	26	0	9	6	3	9	0
Naisten Liiga totals			60	49	64	113	16	27	19	17	36	0

=== International ===
Year	Team	Event	Result	GP	G	A	Pts	PIM
2020	Finland	U18	4th	6	0	0	0	0
2021	Finland	WC	3rd place, bronze medalist(s)	4	0	1	1	0
2022	Finland	OG	3rd place, bronze medalist(s)	7	0	1	1	0
2022	Finland	EYOF	3rd place, bronze medalist(s)	2	2	2	4	2
2022	Finland	U18	3rd place, bronze medalist(s)	5	3	3	6	2
2022	Finland	WC	6th	7	0	1	1	6
2023	Finland	U18	4th	6	3	2	5	2
2023	Finland	WC	5th	7	0	6	6	0
2024	Finland	WC	3rd place, bronze medalist(s)	7	1	0	1	0
2025	Finland	WC	3rd place, bronze medalist(s)	7	0	3	3	0
2026	Finland	OG	6th	5	1	1	2	0
Junior totals				19	8	7	15	6
Senior totals				44	2	13	15	6

== Awards and honors ==
Award	Year
Naisten Liiga
Aurora Borealis Cup Champion	2023
Aurora Borealis Cup Champion	2024
Karoliina Rantamäki Award (Playoff MVP)	2023
Noora Räty Award (Rookie of the Year)	2023
International
World Championship Bronze Medal	2021, 2024, 2025
Olympic Bronze Medal	2022
EYOF Bronze Medal	2022
World U18 All-Star Team	2022
World U18 Bronze Medal	2022
World U18 Top-3 Player on Team	2022
World U18 Top-3 Player on Team	2023

== See also ==
- List of Finnish women in North American collegiate ice hockey
- List of Olympic women's ice hockey players for Finland
