= Siiri Yrjölä =

Finnish ice hockey player (born 2004)

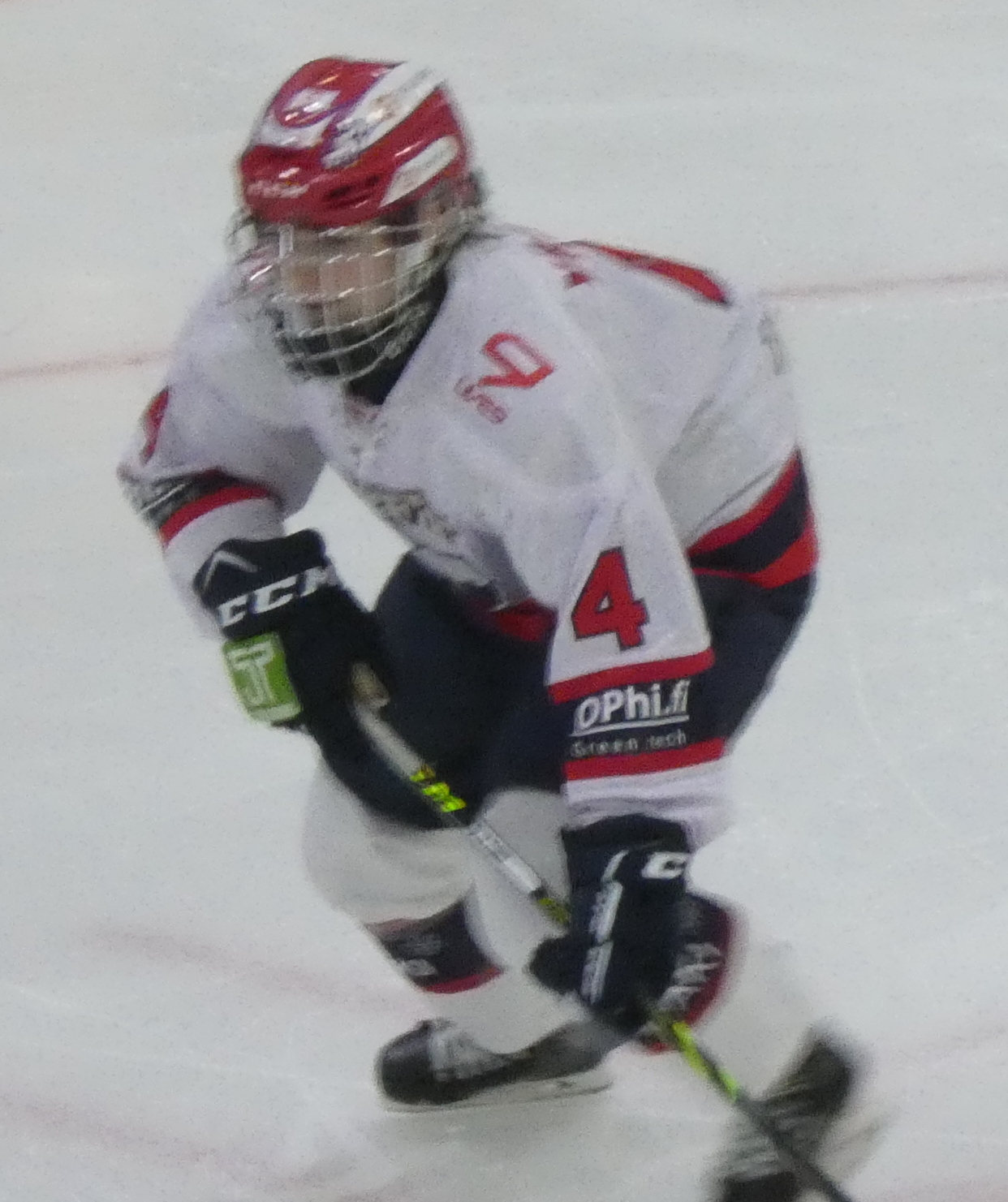
- Yrjölä with HIFK Naiset in 2023
- Born: 8 September 2004 (age 21) Vantaa, Finland
- Height: 5 ft 5 in (165 cm)
- Weight: 150 lb (68 kg; 10 st 10 lb)
- Position: Defense
- Shoots: Left
- NCAA team Former teams: St. Cloud State; IFK Helsinki
- National team: Finland
- Playing career: 2020–present

Siiri Yrjölä (born 8 September 2004) is a Finnish college ice hockey player for St. Cloud State and a member of Finland women's national ice hockey team. She previously played for IFK Helsinki of the Naisten Liiga.

== Playing career ==
Yrjölä began her ice hockey career for IFK Helsinki of the Naisten Liiga. During the 2022–23 season, she led all defensemen in scoring with 16 goals and 26 assists in 31 regular season games. During the 2023 Aurora Borealis Cup playoffs she led all defensemen in scoring with two goals and eight assists in eight playoff games, and helped Helsinki win the Aurora Borealis Cup for the first time in program history. Following the season she was named the Päivi Halonen Award winner, as the league's best defenseman, and named to the Naisten Liiga First All-Star team.

During the 2023–24 season, she recorded five goals and 28 assists in 27 regular season games. Her 28 assists led all defensemen in the league. During the 2024 Aurora Borealis Cup playoffs she recorded one goal and seven assists in 11 games and won the Aurora Borealis Cup for the second consecutive season. Following the season she was again named the Päivi Halonen Award winner, and named to the Naisten Liiga First All-Star team.

Yrjölä began her collegiate career for St. Cloud State during the 2024–25 season. During her rookie year she recorded two goals and three assists in 32 games. She scored her first career collegiate goal on 17 January 2025, in a game against Bemidji State.

== International play ==
Medal record

Representing Finland

World Championship
Bronze medal – third place	2024 United States	
Bronze medal – third place	2025 Czechia	

World U18 Championship
Bronze medal – third place	2022 United States	

Yrjölä represented Finland at the 2022 IIHF World Women's U18 Championship where she recorded three assists in five games and won a bronze medal.

On 12 March 2024, she was named to the roster for Finland at the 2024 IIHF Women's World Championship. During the tournament she was scoreless in seven games and won a bronze medal. On 26 March 2025, she was again selected to represent Finland at the 2025 IIHF Women's World Championship. During the tournament she was scoreless in six games and won a bronze medal.

On 2 January 2026, she was named to Finland's roster to compete at the 2026 Winter Olympics.

== Career statistics ==
=== Regular season and playoffs ===
			Regular season					Playoffs
Season	Team	League	GP	G	A	Pts	PIM	GP	G	A	Pts	PIM
2020–21	IFK Helsinki	NSML	27	5	10	15	2	8	0	4	4	0
2021–22	IFK Helsinki	NSML	29	1	9	10	4	12	2	4	6	2
2022–23	IFK Helsinki	NSML	31	16	26	42	20	8	2	8	10	0
2023–24	IFK Helsinki	NSML	27	5	28	33	6	11	1	7	8	0
2024–25	St. Cloud State University	WCHA	32	2	3	5	6	—	—	—	—	—
NSML totals			114	27	73	100	32	39	5	23	28	2

=== International ===
Year	Team	Event	Result	GP	G	A	Pts	PIM
2020	Finland	U18	4th	6	0	0	0	0
2022	Finland	U18	3rd place, bronze medalist(s)	5	0	3	3	0
2024	Finland	WC	3rd place, bronze medalist(s)	7	0	0	0	8
2025	Finland	WC	3rd place, bronze medalist(s)	6	0	0	0	0
2026	Finland	OG	6th	5	0	0	0	0
Junior totals				11	0	3	3	0
Senior totals				18	0	0	0	8

== Awards and honors ==
Award	Year
Naisten Liiga
All-Star First Team	2023, 2024
Päivi Halonen Award	2023, 2024
Aurora Borealis Cup Champion	2023, 2024
