= Julia Liikala =

Finnish ice hockey player (born 2001)

- Born: 20 March 2001 (age 25) Peräseinäjoki, Finland
- Height: 166 cm (5 ft 5 in)
- Weight: 64 kg (141 lb; 10 st 1 lb)
- Position: Right wing
- Shoots: Left
- SDHL team Former teams: Frölunda HC: HCAP Girls; IFK Helsinki; HPK Hämeenlinna
- National team: Finland
- Playing career: 2016–present
Medal record
Olympic Games
Bronze medal – third place	2022 Beijing	Ice hockey
World Championship
Bronze medal – third place	2021 Canada
Bronze medal – third place	2024 United States
Bronze medal – third place	2025 Czechia

Julia Liikala (born 20 March 2001) is a Finnish ice hockey winger and a member of the Finnish national team. She has played with Frölunda HC in the Swedish Women's Hockey League (SDHL) since August 2026.

== Playing career ==
Liikala was born and raised in Peräseinäjoki, which was merged with Seinäjoki in 2005. As a child, she began playing ice hockey with the local club, S-Kiekko. Her debut in a women's league came at age 13, in a Naisten Suomi-sarja game between S-Kiekko and the Kisa-Eagles on 7 February 2015, where she scored the sixth goal in a 10–0 whitewash.

At age 16, Liikala considered joining Team Kuortane of the Kuortaneen urheilulukio in Kuortane, 42 km (26 mi) east of Seinäjoki, where a significant number of players from the Finnish national U18 team played and attended secondary school (Finnish: lukio). Ultimately, she felt that Kuortane was too close to home and opted instead to sign with HPK Kiekkonaiset and continue her studies in Hämeenlinna, 235 km (146 mi) away.

Liikala played in the Swiss Women's League (PFWL) with Hockey Club Ambrì-Piotta Girls (HCAP Girls) during the 2024–25 and 2025–26 seasons. She was signed to continue with the club for the 2026–27 PFWL season but the team unexpectedly withdrew from the league in late July 2026 and players under contract were left to find new teams on very short notice. Liikala and HCAP teammate Michaela Pejzlová soon thereafter signed to Frölunda HC in the Swedish Women's Hockey League for the 2026–26 SDHL season.

== International play ==
As a junior player with the Finnish national U18 team, Liikala participated in three IIHF World Women's U18 Championships, winning a bronze medal in 2019.

In 2019, Finnish national team head coach, Pasi Mustonen, described Liikala as having an extremely high potential of earning a roster position on the team for the 2022 Winter Olympics and she was selected to represent Finland at the 2020 IIHF Women's World Championship. She was officially named to the roster on 4 March 2020, prior to the cancellation of the tournament on 7 March 2020 due to the COVID-19 pandemic. She had previously appeared with the national team at all of the tournaments of the 2019–20 Women's Euro Hockey Tour.

Liikala ultimately made her World Championship debut in 2021, recording two assists in seven games and winning bronze. As predicted, she was selected to represent Finland in the women's ice hockey tournament at the 2022 Winter Olympics in Beijing and took home an Olympic bronze medal.

She recorded her first World Championship goal in the preliminary round of the 2022 IIHF Women's World Championship, the lone goal scored for Finland in a 1–4 loss to Canada.

On 2 January 2026, she was named to Finland's roster to compete at the 2026 Winter Olympics.

=== Statistics ===
Year	Team	Event	Result	GP	G	A	Pts	PIM
2017	Finland	U18	5th	5	0	0	0	2
2018	Finland	U18	5th	5	3	3	6	0
2019	Finland	U18	3rd place, bronze medalist(s)	6	3	0	3	0
2021	Finland	WC	3rd place, bronze medalist(s)	7	0	2	2	0
2022	Finland	OG	3rd place, bronze medalist(s)	7	0	0	0	0
2022	Finland	WC	6th	7	1	1	2	2
2023	Finland	WC	5th	7	2	4	6	0
2024	Finland	WC	3rd place, bronze medalist(s)	7	0	0	0	0
2025	Finland	WC	3rd place, bronze medalist(s)	7	0	2	2	0
2026	Finland	OG	6th	5	1	0	1	0
Junior totals				16	6	3	9	2
Senior totals				47	4	9	13	2
