= Sofia Nuutinen =

Finnish ice hockey player (born 2002)

- Born: 14 June 2002 (age 24) Vantaa, Finland
- Height: 5 ft 7 in (170 cm)
- Weight: 150 lb (68 kg; 10 st 10 lb)
- Position: Forward
- Shoots: Left
- AHA team Former teams: Mercyhurst; Kiekko-Espoo
- National team: Finland
- Playing career: 2018–present

Sofia Nuutinen (born 14 June 2002) is a Finnish college ice hockey player for Mercyhurst and a member of the Finnish national team. She previously played for Kiekko-Espoo of the Naisten Liiga.

== Playing career ==
On 11 May 2023, Nuutinen signed her National Letter of Intent to play college ice hockey at Mercyhurst. Dduring the 2023–24 season, in her rookie year, she recorded 11 goals and 23 assists in 36 games. Her 34 points ranked second in the nation among all rookies in points. She scored her first career goal in her first career game against Post. She was named the CHA Rookie of the Month in September 2023. She was again named the CHA Rookie of the Month in December 2023 after she recorded three goals and three assists in two games. In the CHA Semifinals against Robert Morris, she tied a CHA single game record for assists in a game with four. Following the season she was named to the CHA All-Rookie Team and USCHO All-Rookie Team.

During the 2024–25 season, in her sophomore year, she recorded 11 goals and 14 assists in 38 games. During the 2025–26 season, in her junior year, she recorded ten goals and 23 assists in 37 games.

== International play ==
Medal record

Representing Finland

World U18 Championship
Bronze medal – third place	2019 Japan	

Nuutinen represented the Finnish under-18 team at the 2019 IIHF U18 Women's World Championship where she recorded and one assist in six games and won a bronze medal. She again represented Finland at the 2020 IIHF U18 Women's World Championship where recorded one goal in six games.

On 31 October 2026, she was named to the Finnish national team at the 2026 IIHF Women's World Championship, where she will make her senior national team debut.

== Personal life ==
Nuutinen was born to Paivi and Tapio Nuutinen, and has four siblings, Emma, Ella, Milo, and Tomas. Her sister, Emma, also played ice hockey at Mercyhurst.

== Career statistics ==
=== Regular season and playoffs ===
			Regular season					Playoffs
Season	Team	League	GP	G	A	Pts	PIM	GP	G	A	Pts	PIM
2017–18	KJT	NSML	23	1	5	6	2	—	—	—	—	—
2018–19	Kiekko-Espoo	NSML	20	5	6	11	2	6	0	1	1	0
2019–20	Kiekko-Espoo	NSML	28	11	10	21	2	6	2	5	7	2
2020–21	Kiekko-Espoo	NSML	26	7	5	12	6	10	2	4	6	6
2021–22	Kiekko-Espoo	NSML	25	9	13	22	12	10	1	3	4	2
2022–23	Kiekko-Espoo	NSML	34	14	25	39	16	11	6	5	11	0
2023–24	Mercyhurst University	CHA	36	11	23	34	12	—	—	—	—	—
2024–25	Mercyhurst University	AHA	38	11	14	25	6	—	—	—	—	—
2025–26	Mercyhurst University	AHA	37	10	23	33	10	—	—	—	—	—
NSML totals			156	47	64	111	40	43	11	18	29	10

=== International ===
Year	Team	Event	Result	GP	G	A	Pts	PIM
2019	Finland	U18	3rd place, bronze medalist(s)	6	0	1	1	2
2020	Finland	U18	4th	6	1	0	1	0
Junior totals				12	1	1	2	2
