= Tea Villilä =

Finnish ice hockey player

- Born: 16 April 1991 (age 35) Hyvinkää, Finland
- Height: 1.68 m (5 ft 6 in)
- Weight: 65 kg (143 lb; 10 st 3 lb)
- Position: Defense
- Shoots: Left
- Auroraliiga team Former teams: Kiekko-Espoo; Minnesota Duluth Bulldogs; HPK Hämeenlinna
- National team: Finland
- Playing career: 2007–present
Medal record
World Championship
Bronze medal – third place	2011 Switzerland
Universiade
Bronze medal – third place	2009 Harbin	Ice hockey

Tea Sonja-Anastasia Villilä (born 16 April 1991) is a Finnish ice hockey defenseman. She plays in the Auroraliiga (called Naisten Liiga until 2024) with Kiekko-Espoo. A member of the Finnish national team during 2010 to 2015, she won a bronze medal at the 2011 IIHF Women's World Championship and was part of the Finnish delegation at the 2014 Winter Olympics.

== International career ==
As a junior player with the Finnish national under-18 team, Villilä participated in the IIHF U18 Women's World Championships in 2008 and 2009. She was selected as a top-three player for Finland by the coaches at the 2009 tournament.

She represented Finland in the women's ice hockey tournament at the 2009 Winter Universiade in Harbin, China and contributed one goal and three assists to Finland's bronze medal finish.

Villilä made her debut with the Finnish senior national team at the IIHF Women's World Championship in 2011, where she won a bronze medal. She also participated in the World Championship tournaments in 2012 and 2013, at which Finland finished in fourth place.

She represented Finland in the women's ice hockey tournament at the 2014 Winter Olympics in Sochi, Russia. Playing in a limited role, she recorded 38 minutes, 20 seconds on ice across six games (an average of 6 minutes, 23 seconds per game) and did not score any points.

== Career statistics ==
=== Regular season and playoffs ===
			Regular season					Playoffs
Season	Team	League	GP	G	A	Pts	PIM	GP	G	A	Pts	PIM
2006–07	HPK	N. I-div.	8	2	2	4	14	–	–	–	–	–
2007–08	Jää-Ahmat U17	U17 SMs	2	0	0	0	0	–	–	–	–	–
2007–08	Espoo Blues	NSMs	15	2	6	8	30	9	3	2	5	18
2008–09	Jää-Ahmat U18	U18 II-div.	2	0	0	0	0	–	–	–	–	–
2008–09	Espoo Blues	NSMs	16	0	9	9	76	6	0	3	3	0
2009–10	Espoo Blues	NSMs	15	3	4	7	28	12	0	0	0	2
2010–11	HPK	NSMs	13	1	13	14	6	6	1	3	4	8
2011–12	UMD Bulldogs	NCAA	32	1	8	9	84	–	–	–	–	–
2012–13	UMD Bulldogs	NCAA	28	1	4	5	32	–	–	–	–	–
2013–14	UMD Bulldogs	NCAA	28	2	11	13	30	–	–	–	–	–
2014–15	UMD Bulldogs	NCAA	30	1	7	8	20	–	–	–	–	–
2015–16	HPK	NSMs	20	6	22	28	24	10	0	0	0	12
2016–17	Espoo United	NSMs	27	3	17	20	63	10	2	5	7	8
2017–18	Espoo Blues	NSML	29	6	16	22	50	10	0	0	0	4
2018–19	Espoo Blues	NSML	16	4	10	14	40	–	–	–	–	–
2019–20	Kiekko-Espoo	NSML	24	0	13	13	30	6	1	3	4	8
2020–21	Kiekko-Espoo	NSML	27	8	13	21	36	9	0	3	3	37
2021–22	Kiekko-Espoo	NSML	22	2	16	18	20	12	2	3	5	12
2022–23	Kiekko-Espoo	NSML	31	4	21	25	48	11	1	7	8	14
2023–24	Kiekko-Espoo	NSML	21	9	13	22	20	10	1	3	4	8
NCAA totals			118	5	30	35	166	–	–	–	–	–
Naisten Liiga totals			276	48	173	221	471	111	11	32	43	131

=== International ===
Year	Team	Event	Result	GP	G	A	Pts	PIM
2008	Finland U18	WC18	6th	5	0	3	3	12
2009	Finland U18	WC18	5th	5	0	0	0	16
2011	Finland	WC	3rd place, bronze medalist(s)	6	0	1	1	4
2012	Finland	WC	4th	6	0	1	1	6
2013	Finland	WC	4th	6	0	0	0	6
2014	Finland	OG	5th	6	0	0	0	4
Junior totals				10	0	3	3	28
Senior totals				24	0	2	2	20

== See also ==
- List of Olympic women's ice hockey players for Finland
- List of Finnish women in North American collegiate ice hockey
