= Sofianna Sundelin =

Finnish ice hockey player

- Born: 3 January 2003 (age 23) Ulvila, Finland
- Height: 169 cm (5 ft 7 in)
- Position: Wing
- Shoots: Left
- NCAA team Former teams: St. Cloud State Huskies; Team Kuortane
- National team: Finland
- Playing career: 2018–present
Medal record
Olympic Games
Bronze medal – third place	2022 Beijing	Ice hockey
World Championship
Bronze medal – third place	2021 Canada
Bronze medal – third place	2024 United States
Bronze medal – third place	2025 Czechia

Sofianna Sundelin (born 13 January 2003) is a Finnish ice hockey player for St. Cloud State in the NCAA Division I and member of the Finnish national team.

== Playing career ==
Sundelin began playing ice hockey with the minor ice hockey department of HC Ässät in Pori, the western neighbor of her hometown of Ulvila, near the Bothnian Bay in southwestern Finland. During her youth career, she also played with girls' teams of Panelian Raikas (PaRa) in Eura.

Sundelin played five seasons with Team Kuortane (2018–2023) in the Naisten Liiga (NSML; renamed Auroraliiga in 2024), the premier national women's ice hockey league in Finland. She ended her career with Team Kuortane second on the lists of all-time points and goals scored for the team.

=== College ===
Sundelin joined the St. Cloud State Huskies women's ice hockey program as an incoming freshman for the 2023–24 season. She made an immediate impression, notching two assists across the season opener two-game series against the Union Garnet Chargers. Her point total led all rookies in the Western Collegiate Hockey Association (WCHA) conference and resulted in her being named the first WCHA Rookie of the Week on 26 September 2023.

In her sophomore season, Sundelin was named WCHA Forward of the Week for the week of 3 February 2025, after collecting four points (3+1) across the Huskies' series split against St. Thomas.

== International play ==
As a junior ice hockey player with the Finnish national under-18 team, Sundelin participated in the IIHF U18 Women's World Championships in 2019 and 2020, winning a bronze medal at the 2019 tournament.

She made her senior national team debut at the 2021 IIHF Women's World Championship, contributing an assist to Finland's bronze medal performance, and went on to win a bronze medal while representing Finland in the women's ice hockey tournament at the 2022 Winter Olympics in Beijing.

Her first goal at a major international event was scored against Japan in the preliminary round of the 2022 IIHF Women's World Championship and was assisted by Kiira Yrjänen.

== Personal life ==
Sundelin attended secondary school at Kuortaneen urheilulukio ('Kuortane Lukio and Sports Academy') in Kuortane, Finland.

Her intended major at St. Cloud State University is exercise science.

== Career statistics ==
=== Regular season and playoffs ===
			Regular season					Playoffs
Season	Team	League	GP	G	A	Pts	PIM	GP	G	A	Pts	PIM
2018–19	Team Kuortane	NSML	26	7	7	14	0	4	1	0	1	0
2019-20	Team Kuortane	NSML	25	7	14	21	4	8	1	2	3	0
2020-21	Team Kuortane	NSML	23	17	18	35	10	2	1	0	1	0
2021-22	Team Kuortane	NSML	22	16	13	29	8	2	0	2	2	0
2022-23	Team Kuortane	NSML	14	10	8	18	4	4	3	1	4	2
2023–24	St. Cloud State	WCHA	36	1	7	8	4	—	—	—	—	—
2024–25	St. Cloud State	WCHA	36	11	9	20	16	—	—	—	—	—
Naisten Liiga totals			110	57	60	117	26	20	6	5	11	2

=== International ===
Year	Team	Event	Result	GP	G	A	Pts	PIM
2019	Finland	U18	3rd place, bronze medalist(s)	6	0	0	0	0
2020	Finland	U18	4th	6	0	3	3	0
2021	Finland	WC	3rd place, bronze medalist(s)	7	0	1	1	0
2022	Finland	OG	3rd place, bronze medalist(s)	7	0	0	0	2
2022	Finland	WC	6th	7	1	1	2	0
2023	Finland	WC	5th	7	0	5	5	6
2024	Finland	WC	3rd place, bronze medalist(s)	7	1	0	1	2
2025	Finland	WC	3rd place, bronze medalist(s)	7	0	0	0	0
Junior totals				12	0	3	3	0
Senior totals				42	2	7	9	10

== Awards and honors ==
Award	Period
International
World U18 Bronze Medal	2019
World Championship Bronze Medal	2021, 2024, 2025
Olympic Bronze Medal	2022
Naisten Liiga
All-Star Second Team	2022–23
