= 2024 Aurora Borealis Cup playoffs =

Finnish Championship ice hockey tournament edition

Naisten Liiga pudotuspelit 2024 (Finnish) 2024 Naisten Liiga playoffs

Tournament details
- Dates: 23 February 2024–21 March 2024
- Format: Best-of-five
- Teams: 8
- Defending champions: IFK Helsinki

Final positions
- Champions: IFK Helsinki (2nd title)
- Runners-up: Kiekko-Espoo
- Third place: KalPa Kuopio
- Fourth place: HPK Hämeenlinna

Tournament statistics
- Games played: 25
- Goals scored: 124 (4.96 per game)
- Attendance: 5,040 (202 per game)
- Scoring leader(s): Emma Nuutinen (15)

Awards
- MVP: Clara Rozier

The 2024 Aurora Borealis Cup playoffs or the 2024 Naisten Liiga playoffs (Finnish: Naisten Liiga pudotuspelit 2024) was the postseason tournament of the 2023–24 season of the Naisten Liiga. The tournament began on 23 February and the Aurora Borealis Cup was awarded to IFK Helsinki (HIFK) on 21 March 2024.

Entering the playoffs, HIFK were the reigning Finnish Champions after winning the 2023 Aurora Borealis Cup. At the conclusion of the 2023–24 regular season, Kiekko-Espoo and HIFK were favorites for the 2024 Aurora Borealis Cup finals.

== Bracket ==
As of 21 March 2024

Quarterfinals
1	Kiekko-Espoo	7	8	5	–	3
8	TPS Turku	0	1	2	–	0
4	KalPa Kuopio	2	2	2	2	3
5	Ilves Tampere	1	3	0	1	1
2	IFK Helsinki	7	3	4	–	3
7	Kärpät Oulu	2	1	2	–	0
3	HPK Hämeenlinna	2	3	5	–	3
6	Team Kuortane	1	0	1	–	0

Semifinals
Kiekko-Espoo	5	4	2	–	3
KalPa Kuopio	3	0	1	–	0
IFK Helsinki	0	5	5	4	3
HPK Hämeenlinna	1	4	0	1	1

Finals
2nd place, silver medalist(s)	Kiekko-Espoo	3	0	2	2	1
1st place, gold medalist(s)	IFK Helsinki	0	2	4	3	3
Bronze medal game
3rd place, bronze medalist(s)	KalPa Kuopio	3
4	HPK Hämeenlinna	1

== Season reviews ==
=== HIFK ===
IFK Helsinki placed second in the regular season, despite having a greater number of games won than first place Kiekko-Espoo, as the result of a six point deduction issued by the disciplinary committee of the Finnish Ice Hockey Association. The penalty was incurred after it was identified that necessary international transfer documents had not been submitted ahead of the 2022–23 Naisten Liiga season for Michaela Pejzlová. Though the team finished in second place, HIFK players topped the league charts in nearly every major metric. Czech centre Michaela Pejzlová won the Marianne Ihalainen Award as the league point leader for the second consecutive season, with 71 points in 24 games, and she also led all players in assists (41).

Pejzlová was not the team's only offensive powerhouse, as four of the league's top-five point leaders were HIFK players.

=== HPK ===
HPK Hämeenlinna finished the season in third place after amassing 66 points and earning a goal difference of +52. The team achieved their best end-of-season rank in eight seasons as the result of excellent goaltending and quality depth scoring. Alternate captain Kiti Seikkula led HPK in points and goals, with 22 goals and 45 points in 31 games. Her point total was followed by Slovak forward Júlia Matejková's 16 goals and 22 points in 29 games and Czech left winger Tereza Pištěková's 24 assists and 35 points in 32 games. The three linemates ranked tenth, twelfth, and thirteenth on the league scoring table, respectively, and Seikkula was eighth in the league for goals scored. An additional three HPK players – right winger Ines Lukkarila, center Ella Välikangas, and defenseman Heta Seikkula – exceeded the twenty-point mark and another two players – Czech winger Barbora Juříčková and defenseman Oona Koukkula – earned 19 points on the season.

Both parts of HPK's goaltender tandem, Eline Gabriele and Janika Järvikari, ranked in the league's top-five of net minders playing at least one-third of their team's minutes for both save percentage and goals against average. Gabriele played half of HPK's games and recorded a very good 91.3 save percentage and solid 1.94 GAA, while Järvikari recorded a sublime 93.1 save percentage and league-leading 1.42 GAA. Canadian goaltender Kassidy Sauvé, who had masterfully backstopped the team during the 2022 Aurora Borealis Cup playoffs, signed with HPK in December 2023 and played in six regular season games during January and February, amassing a shaky 88.0 save percentage during that time.

=== KalPa ===
KalPa Kuopio finished the regular season ranked fourth in the league, with 60 points and a goal difference of +38. Star left winger Elisa Holopainen tallied 57 points despite missing all of September and most of October while rehabilitating from a major leg injury. Her 32 goals and 25 assists in nineteen games led all KalPa players in points and goals. Captain Johanna Juutilainen led the team in assists (26) and she ended the season with 46 points in 32 games. Other notable contributors to KalPa’s scoring were defenseman Sanni Rantala, who notched 34 points (13+21) in 30 games, and forward Tilli Keränen, who recorded a career-best 30 points (14+16) in 28 games.

Goaltender Tiina Ranne led the league in time on ice, with nearly 1,235 minutes in net, and her 21 games played tied Olivia Last of TPS for most played. Her 90.2 save percentage ranked ninth of all goaltenders playing at least one-third of their team's minutes and her 2.53 goals against average ranked seventh. Backup net-minders Aino Laitinen and Jenna Juutilainen recorded save percentages of 91.2 in eight games and 89.9 in four games, respectively.

=== Ilves ===
For the second consecutive season, Ilves Tampere amassed 59 points and were seeded fifth at the conclusion of the regular season. The team's +8 goal difference was one goal higher than their +7 for the 2022–23 season. Alternate captain Anniina Kaitala led the team in both goals (21) and points (34), and her eight power play goals ranked first in the league. First line centre Emilia Varpula was Ilves' assist leader, recording 27 assists and 33 points in 31 games, and alternate captain Helen Puputti notched 32 points (13+19) in 31 games. Elli Suoranta was the top scoring defender for Ilves, tallying 28 points (13+15) in 27 games.

=== Team Kuortane ===
For the third consecutive season, Team Kuortane placed sixth in the league. The team struggled to score throughout the season and were shutout in ten games during the 32-game season, ultimately recording a –34 goal difference. Raili Mustonen led the team in points, scoring 7 goals and 15 points in 30 games, and ranked 51st on the league scoring table. Sofia Kari was Kuortane's leading goal scorer, with 9 goals and 14 points in 31 games, and Aino Krook led the team in assists, with 11 assists and 14 points in 32 games.

Emilia Kyrkkö, the 2022–23 Naisten Liiga Goaltender of the Year, was limited to six games of the 2023–24 season due to injury, leaving the starting net-minder position vacant. Early in the season, goalie Venla Varis suffered a season-ending injury and Kuortane's other two backup goaltenders – Lilia Huovinen and Kerttu Kuja-Halkola – scrambled to perform on a consistent basis. As the season progressed, Kuja-Halkola steadily improved from an 88.7 save percentage at the end of September to a team-leading 91.2 save percentage by season's end – for which she was recognized with selection to the Naisten Liiga All-Star second team.

== Quarterfinals ==
The best-of-five quarterfinals (Finnish: puolivälierät) began on Friday, 23 February and concluded on Sunday, 3 March. The top eight teams from the regular season qualified for the quarterfinal round. In three of the four series, home ice advantage was granted to the higher seeded teams for the first, third, and fifth games.

=== (1) K-Espoo vs. (8) TPS ===
All times local, Eastern European Time (UTC+2)

24 February 2024; 15:15	Kiekko-Espoo	7–0 (0–0, 4–0, 3–0)	TPS Turku	Tapiola 2, Espoo; Attendance: 101

Tiia Pajarinen
Goalies
Olivia Last
Referee:
Reetta-Kaisa Lusi
Linesmen:
Ilona Silander
Salla-Maaria Raitala

Täks (Nuutinen, Schalin) – 21:12	1–0
Täks (Haukijärvi, Eronen) – 28:27	2–0
Haukijärvi (Eronen, Schalin) – 31:13	3–0
Täks (Tuominen) – 36:04	4–0
Talvitie (Zielińska) – 41:33	5–0
Valkjärvi (Nuutinen, Toivonen) – 43:43	6–0
Villilä (Tuominen, Nuutinen) (PP) – 55:43	7–0

6 min
Penalties
6 min
71
Shots
7

25 February 2024; 14:50	TPS Turku	1–8 (0–2, 1–5, 0–1)	Kiekko-Espoo	Kupittaa, Turku; Attendance: 70

Suvi Saarinen
Goalies
Minja Drufva
Referee:
Tuomas Tilkanen
Linesmen:
Valtteri Jokinen
Max Kaituri

	0–1	18:55 – Katajamäki (Nuutinen, Toivonen)
	0–2	19:33 – Schalin (Villilä, Eronen)
Viitala (Narovcová, Ilvonen) – 21:55	1–2
	1–3	25:30 – Tuominen (Valkjärvi, Nuutinen)
	1–4	28:34 – Täks (Eronen, Haukijärvi)
	1–5	30:07 – Nuutinen (Tuominen)
	1–6	33:25 – Eronen (Schalin)
	1–7	37:06 – Täks (Tuominen)
	1–8	59:35 – Lehtopelto (Zielińska, Talvitie)

2 min
Penalties
2 min
12
Shots
71

29 February 2024; 18:45	Kiekko-Espoo	5–2 (1–0, 1–1, 3–1)	TPS Turku	Tapiola 2, Espoo; Attendance: 111

Tiia Pajarinen
Goalies
Olivia Last
Referee:
Reetta-Kaisa Lusi
Linesmen:
Ilona Silander
Salla-Maaria Raitala

Nuutinen – 13:56	1–0
	1–1	20:31 – Karru (Viitala, Ilvonen) (PP)
Täks (Villilä, Schalin) – 22:40	2–1
Haukijärvi (Eronen) – 52:20	3–1
Talvitie (Schalin, Lehtopelto) – 54:12	4–1
Nuutinen (Zielińska, Toivonen) – 55:29	5–1
	5–2	58:42 – Kangas (Ilvonen)

4 min
Penalties
6 min
44
Shots
8

=== (2) HIFK vs. (7) Kärpät ===
All times local, Eastern European Time (UTC+2)

24 February 2024; 14:30	IFK Helsinki	7–2 (1–1, 3–1, 3–0)	Kärpät Oulu	Pirkkola, Helsinki; Attendance: 182

Kiia Lahtinen
Goalies
Emilia Piekkari
Referee:
Henna Åberg
Linesmen:
Juuso Simula
Helinä Anttila

Vanhanen (Rozier) – 09:45	1–0
	1–1	14:22 – Siermala (Hautala, Ekoluoma) (PP)
Salonen (Vanhanen, Rozier) – 20:14	2–1
	2–2	22:18 – Hulanmäki (Korpi-Halkola)
Liikala (Pere, Huotari) – 28:57	3–2
Vanhanen – 39:15	4–2
Liikala (Suhonen) – 40:57	5–2
Palin (Liikala, Rantamäki) – 51:42	6–2
Rozier (Vanhanen, Locatelli) – 56:03	7–2

4 min
Penalties
2 min
36
Shots
10

25 February 2024; 15:00	IFK Helsinki	3–2 (2–0, 0–1, 1–1)	Kärpät Oulu	Pirkkola, Helsinki; Attendance: 192

Kiia Lahtinen
Goalies
Kati Asikainen
Referee:
Henna Åberg
Linesmen:
Ilona Silander
Helinä Anttila

Rozier – 02:57	1–0
Rozier (Vanhanen, Salonen) – 07:39	2–0
	2–1	35:17 – Antti-Roiko (Ylitalo, Pitkänen) (PP)
	2–2	46:46 – Ylitalo (Antti-Roiko, Kaijankoski)
Yrjölä (Rantamäki, Liikala) – 48:37	3–2

8 min
Penalties
2 min
37
Shots
14

29 February 2024; 18:15	Kärpät Oulu	2–4 (1–1, 0–0, 1–3)	IFK Helsinki	Raksila, Oulu; Attendance: 207

Kati Asikainen
Goalies
Kiia Lahtinen
Referee:
Juuso Herranen
Linesmen:
Sami Väisänen
Pietu Mustonen

Ekoluoma (Antti-Roiko, Kylmäaho) – 02:15	1–0
	1–1	17:05 – Rozier (Yrjölä, Rantamäki) (VR)
Ekoluoma (Hautala) (DP) – 44:34	2–1
	2–2	44:58 – Salonen (Vanhanen)
	2–3	56:02 – Liikala (Vanhanen, Yrjölä)
	2–4	56:53 – Vanhanen (Liikala)

4 min
Penalties
4 min
18
Shots
35

=== (3) HPK vs. (6) Kuortane ===
HPK swept the season series with Team Kuortane, winning all four games in regulation.

The teams' last playoff meeting was in the 2020 Aurora Borealis Cup quarterfinals, which Team Kuortane won in five games.

All times local, Eastern European Time (UTC+2)

24 February 2024; 14:00	HPK Hämeenlinna	2–1 GWS (0–0, 1–1, 0–0) (OT: 0–0) (SO: 1–0)	Team Kuortane	Hämeenlinnan harjoitushalli, Hämeenlinna; Attendance: 130

Kassidy Sauvé	Goalies	Emilia Kyrkkö	Referee: Ilpo Lehtimäki; Linesmen: Aapo Hautakangas; Lauri Kangaspusu
Mäkivaara (Koukkula) – 21:45 / 1–0; / 1–1 / 35:41 – Kokora (Tarkiainen)			Referee: Ilpo Lehtimäki; Linesmen: Aapo Hautakangas; Lauri Kangaspusu
Mäkivaara (miss); K. Seikkula (miss); Pištěková (miss); Matejková; H. Seikkula	Shootout	(miss) Virtanen; Kari; (miss) Krook; (miss) Mustonen; (miss) Byskata	Referee: Ilpo Lehtimäki; Linesmen: Aapo Hautakangas; Lauri Kangaspusu
6 min	Penalties	8 min	Referee: Ilpo Lehtimäki; Linesmen: Aapo Hautakangas; Lauri Kangaspusu
39	Shots	32	Referee: Ilpo Lehtimäki; Linesmen: Aapo Hautakangas; Lauri Kangaspusu

25 February 2024; 15:00	Team Kuortane	0–3 (0–1, 0–1, 0–1)	HPK Hämeenlinna	Kuortaneen jäähalli, Kuortane; Attendance: 95

Emilia Kyrkkö
Goalies
Kassidy Sauvé
Referee:
Tiina Saarimäki
Linesmen:
Niko Kalliolepo
Lassi Mukkala

0–1	14:32 – Pištěková (Matejková) (PP)
0–2	35:29 – Juříčková (Vaníčková, Wilkman)
0–3	49:20 – Pištěková (K. Seikkula, Wilkman) (SH)

6 min
Penalties
4 min
23
Shots
22

28 February 2024; 18:45	HPK Hämeenlinna	5–1 (2–0, 0–1, 3–0)	Team Kuortane	Hämeenlinnan harjoitushalli, Hämeenlinna; Attendance: 90

Kassidy Sauvé
Goalies
Emilia Kyrkkö
Referee:
Tiina Saarimäki
Linesmen:
Joni Kivistö
Jarno Kuokkanen

Matejková (Pištěková, K. Seikkula) – 09:37	1–0
K. Seikkula (Pištěková, Matejková) (PP) – 19:13	2–0
	2–1	24:30 – Mustonen (Tarkiainen, Lehmus) (PP2)
Välikangas (Mäkivaara, Lukkarila) – 54:04	3–1
H. Seikkula (Pištěková) (EN) – 58:27	4–1
K. Seikkula (Pištěková, H. Seikkula) (SH, EN) – 59:13	5–1

18 min
Penalties
29 min
17
Shots
31

HPK Hämeenlinna swept the series in three games, though the first game was pushed to the shootout after eighty minutes of play.

Tereza Pištěková (2+4=6), Kiti Seikkula (2+2=4), and Júlia Matejková (1+2=3), HPK's top line, were together responsible for five of the team's ten goals and Heta Seikkula led all defensemen in scoring, with 2 goals and 3 points. Goaltender Kassidy Sauvé was excellent, posting a 97.7 save percentage and 0.60 GAA while playing all 200 minutes in net.

As they had in the regular season, Team Kuortane struggled to score during the series and scored two goals across the three games. Goals were scored by Heidi Kokora and Raili Mustonen; Hannele Tarkiainen assisted on both goals and Kerttu Lehmus notched a secondary assist on Mustonen's goal. Emilia Kyrkkö was steady in net, allowing just seven goals on 75 shots against, but her 90.7 save percentage through nearly 195 minutes of play could not negate the lack of offense generated by Kuortane.

=== (4) KalPa vs. (5) Ilves ===
Ilves won three of four games in the 2023–24 season series, though their third meeting was pushed to overtime before Elli Suoranta scored to conclude the game in Ilves’ favor. KalPa won the only game of the series in which Elisa Holopainen played.

In the 2023 playoffs, Ilves lost to HPK in four quarterfinal games and KalPa beat HPK to win Finnish Championship bronze.

All four games of the season series were close affairs, ending with a one-goal difference. Ilves won the first three encounters, though the third game was pushed to overtime before Elli Suoranta scored the game winner. KalPa won the only game in the series in which Elisa Holopainen played.

The teams last met in the postseason during the quarterfinals of the 2020 Aurora Borealis Cup playoffs, which KalPa won in three games.

All times local, Eastern European Time (UTC+2)

23 February 2024; 18:45	KalPa Kuopio	2–1 (0–1, 1–0, 1–0)	Ilves Tampere	Niirala, Kuopio; Attendance: 108

Tiina Ranne
Goalies
Salla Sivula
Referee:
Patrik Jokinen
Linesmen:
Mikko Niskanen
Arttu Riikonen

	0–1	10:19 – Puputti (Siira)
Jo. Juutilainen (Holopainen, Pohjala) – 24:43	1–1
Kastikainen (Keränen, Holopainen) (PP, VR) – 59:04	2–1

2 min
Penalties
8 min
30
Shots
28

25 February 2024; 15:00	Ilves Tampere	3–2 (1–1, 1–0, 1–1)	KalPa Kuopio	Tesoman jäähalli, Tampere; Attendance: 130

Salla Sivula
Goalies
Tiina Ranne
Referee:
Kaisa Ketonen
Linesmen:
Lauri Kangaspusu
Aapo Hautakangas

	0–1	03:45 – Holopainen (Rantala) (PP)
Parkkonen – 10:45	1–1
Melotindos (Kuusisto, Kaitala) – 38:06	2–1
Narinen (Katajamäki) – 41:55	3–1
	3–2	52:57 – Keränen (Holopainen, Rantala)

6 min
Penalties
8 min
38
Shots
35

27 February 2024; 18:45	KalPa Kuopio	2–0 (0–0, 1–0, 1–0)	Ilves Tampere	Niirala, Kuopio; Attendance: 169

Tiina Ranne	Goalies	Salla Sivula	Referee: Patrik Jokinen; Linesmen: Arttu Riikonen; Anni Kankkunen
Rantala (Holopainen, Jo. Juutilainen) – 32:38 / 1–0; Holopainen (Jo. Juutilainen) (SH, EN, DP) – 59:18 / 2–0			Referee: Patrik Jokinen; Linesmen: Arttu Riikonen; Anni Kankkunen
6 min	Penalties	4 min	Referee: Patrik Jokinen; Linesmen: Arttu Riikonen; Anni Kankkunen
28	Shots	22	Referee: Patrik Jokinen; Linesmen: Arttu Riikonen; Anni Kankkunen

2 March 2024; 13:45	Ilves Tampere	1–3 (0–1, 1–1, 0–1)	KalPa Kuopio	Tesoman jäähalli, Tampere; Attendance: 114

Salla Sivula
Goalies
Tiina Ranne
Referee:
Anniina Nurmi
Linesmen:
Lauri Kangaspusu
Aino Ranki

	0–1	07:43 – Holopainen (Keinonen)
Parkkonen (Kuusisto, Kilponen) (PP) – 27:11	1–1
	1–2	29:45 – Holopainen
	1–3	59:56 – Kortelainen (EN)

8 min
Penalties
20 min
22
Shots
22

=== Quarterfinal statistics ===
Scoring leaders

The following players led the league in points at the conclusion of the quarterfinals on 2 March 2024.

Note: This table includes games played during the quarterfinals only. For cumulative playoff totals, see Player statistics.

Player	Team	GP	G	A	Pts	PIM
Elisa Holopainen	KalPa	4	4	4	8	4
Emma Nuutinen	K-Espoo	3	3	5	8	0
Sanni Vanhanen	HIFK	3	3	5	8	0
Lisette Täks	K-Espoo	3	6	0	6	2
Clara Rozier	HIFK	3	4	2	6	0
Julia Liikala	HIFK	3	3	3	6	0
Tereza Pištěková	HPK	3	2	4	6	4
Ada Eronen	K-Espoo	3	1	5	6	0
Julia Schalin	K-Espoo	3	1	5	6	4
Minttu Tuominen	K-Espoo	2	1	4	5	0
Tinja-Mariia Haukijärvi	K-Espoo	3	2	2	4	0
Kiti Seikkula	HPK	3	2	2	4	0
Emma Ekoluoma	Kärpät	3	2	1	3	0
Pauliina Salonen	HIFK	3	2	1	3	2
Heta Seikkula	HPK	3	2	1	3	2
Elsa Talvitie	K-Espoo	3	2	1	3	0

The following skaters were the top point scorers of teams not represented in the scoring leader table at the conclusion of the quarterfinals on 2 March 2024, noted with their overall scoring rank:

24. Eevi Ilvonen, TPS: 3 GP, 0 G, 3 A, 3 Pts, 0 PIM
28. Pihla Parkkonen, Ilves: 4 GP, 2 G, 0 A, 2 Pts, 2 PIM
34. Hannele Tarkiainen, Kuortane: 3 GP, 0 G, 2 A, 2 Pts, 2 PIM

Goaltenders

The following goaltenders had played at least two periods in net at the conclusion of the quarterfinals on 2 March 2024, sorted by save percentage.

Note: This table includes games played during the quarterfinals only. For cumulative playoff totals, see player statistics.

Player	Team	GP	TOI	W	L	SA	GA	SO	SV%	GAA
Kassidy Sauvé	HPK	3	200:00	2	0	86	2	1	97.7	0.60
Tiina Ranne	KalPa	4	239:10	3	1	111	5	1	95.7	1.25
Salla Sivula	Ilves	4	239:03	1	3	100	7	0	93.5	1.76
Minja Drufva	K-Espoo	1	60:00	1	0	12	1	0	91.7	1.00
Emilia Kyrkkö	Kuortane	3	194:55	0	2	75	7	0	90.7	2.15
Kati Asikainen	Kärpät	2	117:22	0	2	65	7	0	90.3	3.58
Olivia Last	TPS	2	120:00	0	2	103	12	0	89.6	6.00
Suvi Saarinen	TPS	1	60:00	0	1	71	8	0	88.7	8.00
Tiia Pajarinen	K-Espoo	2	120:00	2	0	13	2	1	86.7	1.00
Kiia Lahtinen	HIFK	3	180:00	3	0	36	6	0	85.7	2.00
Emilia Piekkari	Kärpät	1	60:00	0	1	36	7	0	80.6	7.00

== Semifinals ==
The best-of-five semifinals (Finnish: välierät) began on Tuesday, 5 March and concluded on Sunday, 10 March.

=== K-Espoo vs. KalPa ===
The last postseason encounter between KalPa and Kiekko-Espoo came in the semifinals of the 2022 Aurora Borealis Cup playoffs, which Kiekko-Espoo won in four games. KalPa went on to win Finnish Championship bronze against HPK and Kiekko-Espoo took home silver after being swept in the finals by HIFK.

All times local, Eastern European Time (UTC+2)

5 March 2024; 18:45	Kiekko-Espoo	5–3 (1–2, 3–1, 1–0)	KalPa Kuopio	Tapiola 2, Espoo; Attendance: 157

Tiia Pajarinen
Goalies
Tiina Ranne
Referee:
Kaisa Kettonen
Linesmen:
Veeti Hurme
Salla-Maaria Raitala

	0–1	02:53 – Holopainen (Pohjala, Jo. Juutilainen)
	0–2	09:42 – Holopainen (Paroinen)
Schalin (Toivonen, Tuominen) (PP) – 18:07	1–2
Toivonen (Nuutinen) – 21:31	2–2
Koskipalo (Virtanen) – 31:02	3–2
Toivonen (Talvitie) – 39:24	4–2
	4–3	39:47 – Holopainen (DP)
Nuutinen (PP) – 50:56	5–3

4 min
Penalties
4 min
44
Shots
19

7 March 2024; 18:00	KalPa Kuopio	0–4 (0–2, 0–2, 0–0)	Kiekko-Espoo	Niirala, Kuopio; Attendance: 162

Tiina Ranne
Goalies
Tiia Pajarinen
Referee:
Juuso Herranen
Linesmen:
Niko Liukkonen
Santeri Smahl

0–1	09:53 – Nuutinen (Toivonen, Tuominen)
0–2	10:14 – Täks
0–3	31:23 – Nuutinen (Haukijärvi, Tuominen) (PP)
0–4	36:22 – Koskipalo (Valkjärvi)

8 min
Penalties
6 min
16
Shots
40

9 March 2024; 17:45	Kiekko-Espoo	2–1 (0–1, 0–0, 2–0)	KalPa Kuopio	Tapiola 2, Espoo; Attendance: 206

Tiia Pajarinen
Goalies
Tiina Ranne
Referee:
Kaisa Ketonen
Linesmen:
Helinä Anttila
Ilona Silander

	0–1	15:58 – Rantala (Holopainen, Ad. Makkonen)
Katajamäki (Eronen, Nuutinen) – 49:30	1–1
Täks (Haukijärvi, Eronen) – 57:07	2–1

6 min
Penalties
2 min
27
Shots
16

=== HIFK vs. HPK ===
HIFK and HPK's last playoff meeting was in the 2023 semifinals, which HIFK swept in three games. HIFK went on to win the Aurora Borealis Cup for the first time. HPK lost the 2023 Finnish Championship bronze medal game to KalPa.

All times local, Eastern European Time (UTC+2)

5 March 2024; 19:00	IFK Helsinki	0–1 (0–0, 0–0, 0–1)	HPK Hämeenlinna	Pirkkola, Helsinki; Attendance: 178

Kiia Lahtinen	Goalies	Kassidy Sauvé	Referee: Anniina Nurmi; Linesmen: Helinä Anttila; Ilona Silander
0–1 / 46:50 – Koukkula (Juříčková, Välikangas)			Referee: Anniina Nurmi; Linesmen: Helinä Anttila; Ilona Silander
0 min	Penalties	6 min	Referee: Anniina Nurmi; Linesmen: Helinä Anttila; Ilona Silander
30	Shots	22	Referee: Anniina Nurmi; Linesmen: Helinä Anttila; Ilona Silander

7 March 2024; 18:45	HPK Hämeenlinna	4–5 (2–1, 0–3, 2–1)	IFK Helsinki	Hämeenlinnan harjoitushalli, Hämeenlinna; Attendance: 210

Kassidy Sauvé
Goalies
Kiia Lahtinen
Referee:
Tiina Saarimäki
Linesmen:
Aino Ranki
Jarno Kuokkanen

	0–1	03:02 – Vanhanen (Salonen, Locatelli)
Matejková (Pištěková) – 06:16	1–1
Mäkivaara (Lukkarila, Ahlskog) – 13:31	2–1
	2–2	22:51 – Pejzlová (Rozier, Locatelli)
	2–3	29:54 – Locatelli (Vanhanen, Andersson) (VR)
	2–4	34:45 – Salonen (Pejzlová) (PP)
Lukkarila (Ahlskog, Välikangas) – 43:37	3–4
H. Seikkula (K. Seikkula) – 53:54	4–4
	4–5	56:40 – Salonen (Locatelli, Kylliäinen)

8 min
Penalties
6 min
18
Shots
42

9 March 2024; 13:00	IFK Helsinki	5–0 (0–0, 2–0, 3–0)	HPK Hämeenlinna	Pirkkola, Helsinki; Attendance: 210

Miia Vainio
Goalies
Kassidy Sauvé
Referee:
Annina Nurmi
Linesmen:
Salla-Maaria Raitala
Aino Ranki

Pejzlová (Pere) – 25:09	1–0
Rantamäki (Pejzlová, Liikala) (PP) – 37:35	2–0
Pere – 47:55	3–0
Liikala (Pejzlová, Rantamäki) – 55:16	4–0
Liikala (Pejzlová, Andersson) – 59:43	5–0

8 min
Penalties
10 min
35
Shots
9

10 March 2024; 13:30	HPK Hämeenlinna	1–4 (1–1, 0–2, 0–1)	IFK Helsinki	Hämeenlinnan harjoitushalli, Hämeenlinna; Attendance: 140

Kassidy Sauvé
Goalies
Miia Vainio
Referee:
Tiina Saarimäki
Linesmen:
Aino Ranki
Jarno Kuokkanen

	0–1	15:53 – Kemppainen
Pištěková (K. Seikkula, Matejková) – 19:14	1–1
	1–2	20:14 – Kemppainen (Yrjölä, Pejzlová) (PP)
	1–3	26:37 – Rozier (Yrjölä, Locatelli)
	1–4	48:30 – Vanhanen (Rozier, Locatelli)

4 min
Penalties
8 min
15
Shots
34

=== Semifinal statistics ===
Scoring leaders

The following players led the league in semifinal points at the conclusion of the semifinals on 10 March 2024.

Note: This table includes games played during the semifinals only. For cumulative totals, see player statistics.

Player	Team	GP	G	A	Pts	PIM
Michaela Pejzlová	HIFK	4	2	5	7	0
Athéna Locatelli	HIFK	4	1	5	6	0
Emma Nuutinen	K-Espoo	3	3	2	5	0
Elisa Holopainen	KalPa	3	3	1	4	2
Aliisa Toivonen	K-Espoo	3	2	2	4	0
Julia Liikala	HIFK	4	2	1	3	2
Pauliina Salonen	HIFK	4	2	1	3	2
Sanni Vanhanen	HIFK	4	2	1	3	0
Clara Rozier	HIFK	4	1	2	3	6
Minttu Tuominen	K-Espoo	3	0	3	3	2

The following skater was the top point scorer of HPK, the only team not included in the scoring leaders table, noted with her overall scoring rank:

16. Ines Lukkarila, HPK: 3 GP, 1 G, 1 A, 2 Pts, 4 PIM

Goaltenders

The following goaltenders had played at least two semifinal periods in net at the conclusion of the semifinals on 10 March 2024, sorted by save percentage.

Note: This table includes games played during the semifinals only. For cumulative playoff totals, see player statistics.

Player	Team	GP	TOI	W	L	SA	GA	SO	SV%	GAA
Miia Vainio	HIFK	2	120:00	2	0	24	1	1	95.8	0.50
Tiina Ranne	KalPa	3	176:52	0	3	116	11	0	94.5	3.73
Tiia Pajarinen	K-Espoo	3	180:00	3	0	53	4	1	92.5	1.33
Kiia Lahtinen	HIFK	2	118:06	1	1	46	5	0	91.1	2.54
Kassidy Sauvé	HPK	4	237:21	1	3	141	14	1	90.1	3.54

== Bronze medal game ==
The Finnish Championship bronze medal game (Finnish: pronssiottelu) was played on Saturday, 16 March 2024.

Game time local, Eastern European Time (UTC+2)

16 March 2024; 14:00	HPK Hämeenlinna	1–3 (0–2, 0–1, 1–0)	KalPa Kuopio	Hämeenlinnan harjoitushalli, Hämeenlinna; Attendance: 230

Kassidy Sauvé
Goalies
Tiina Ranne
Referee:
Reetta-Kaisa Lusi
Linesmen:
Salla-Maaria Raitala
Ilona Silander

	0–1	02:21 – Jo. Juutilainen
	0–2	10:26 – Holopainen (Rantala, Keränen)
	0–3	24:50 – Holopainen
Stoltenberg (Pištěková, Matejková) (EA) – 57:10	1–3

6 min
Penalties
2 min
18
Shots
35

== Finals ==
The best-of-five Finnish Championship finals (Finnish: Suomen mestaruus finaalit or SM-finaalit), also called the grand finale (Finnish: loppuottelut), began on Saturday, 16 March and the Aurora Borealis Cup will be awarded no later than Saturday, 23 March 2024.

All times local, Eastern European Time (UTC+2)

16 March 2024; 14:45	Kiekko-Espoo	3–0 (2–0, 0–0, 1–0)	IFK Helsinki	Tapiola 2, Espoo; Attendance: 436

Tiia Pajarinen
Goalies
Miia Vainio
Referee:
Anniina Nurmi
Linesmen:
Aino Ranki
Helinä Anttila

Talvitie (Virtanen, Koskipalo) – 07:00	1–0
Tuominen (Schalin, Nuutinen) (PP) – 17:48	2–0
Täks (Villilä, Haukijärvi) – 47:20	3–0

6 min
Penalties
8 min
24
Shots
33

17 March 2024; 15:00	IFK Helsinki	2–0 (1–0, 0–0, 1–0)	Kiekko-Espoo	Pirkkola, Helsinki; Attendance: 419

Miia Vainio	Goalies	Tiia Pajarinen	Referee: Tiina Saarimäki; Linesmen: Helinä Anttila; Ilona Silander
Rozier (Locatelli, Kemppainen) (PP) – 05:42 / 1–0; Salonen (Rozier, Yrjölä) – 54:39 / 2–0			Referee: Tiina Saarimäki; Linesmen: Helinä Anttila; Ilona Silander
6 min	Penalties	8 min	Referee: Tiina Saarimäki; Linesmen: Helinä Anttila; Ilona Silander
19	Shots	29	Referee: Tiina Saarimäki; Linesmen: Helinä Anttila; Ilona Silander

19 March 2024; 18:45	Kiekko-Espoo	2–4 (0–1, 0–1, 2–2)	IFK Helsinki	Tapiola 2, Espoo; Attendance: 443

Tiia Pajarinen
Goalies
Miia Vainio
Referee:
Anniina Nurmi
Linesmen:
Salla-Maaria Raitala
Aino Ranki

	0–1	01:09 – Liikala (Rantamäki, Yrjölä)
	0–2	25:25 – Salonen (Rozier, Yrjölä)
	0–3	53:03 – Kemppainen (Liikala, Vanhanen) (PP)
Katajamäki (Tuominen, Valkjärvi) (PP, EA) – 57:03	1–3
	1–4	58:36 – Liikala (SH, EN)
Täks (Schalin, Zielińska) – 59:20	2–4

6 min
Penalties
10 min
29
Shots
20

21 March 2024; 18:30	IFK Helsinki	3–2 (2–1, 1–1, 0–0)	Kiekko-Espoo	Pirkkola, Helsinki; Attendance: 550

Miia Vainio
Goalies
Tiia Pajarinen
Referee:
Anniina Nurmi
Linesmen:
Helinä Anttila
Aino Ranki

Rozier (Vanhanen, Pere) – 05:53	1–0
	1–1	15:13 – Täks (Haukijärvi, Eronen)
Vanhanen (Liikala) – 18:30	2–1
	2–2	35:11 – Katajamäki (Virtanen, Emma Nuutinen)
Liikala (Rozier) (PP) – 38:17	3–2

2 min
Penalties
6 min
25
Shots
26

== Player statistics ==
=== Scoring leaders ===
The following players led the league in playoff points at the conclusion of the playoffs on 21 March 2024.

Player	Team	GP	G	A	Pts	PIM
Emma Nuutinen	K-Espoo	10	6	9	15	2
Elisa Holopainen	KalPa	8	9	5	14	6
Julia Liikala	HIFK	11	8	6	14	2
Clara Rozier	HIFK	11	7	7	14	12
Sanni Vanhanen	HIFK	11	6	8	14	0
Lisette Täks	K-Espoo	10	11	0	11	2
Minttu Tuominen	K-Espoo	9	2	8	10	6
Tereza Pištěková	HPK	8	3	6	9	4
Julia Schalin	K-Espoo	10	2	7	9	4
Ada Eronen	K-Espoo	10	1	8	9	4
Pauliina Salonen	HIFK	11	6	2	8	4
Tinja-Mariia Haukijärvi	K-Espoo	10	2	6	8	0
Athéna Locatelli	HIFK	11	1	7	8	0
Siiri Yrjölä	HIFK	11	1	7	8	0
Michaela Pejzlová	HIFK	7	2	5	7	0
Aliisa Toivonen	K-Espoo	10	2	5	7	4
Júlia Matejková	HPK	8	2	4	6	10
Kiti Seikkula	HPK	8	2	4	6	0
Karoliina Rantamäki	HIFK	11	1	5	6	4
Elsa Talvitie	K-Espoo	10	3	2	5	2

=== Goaltenders ===
The following goaltenders played at least two periods of a playoff match at the conclusion of the playoffs on 21 March 2024, sorted by save percentage.

^	Team eliminated in quarterfinals

Player	Team	GP	TOI	W	L	SA	GA	SO	SV%	GAA
Miia Vainio	HIFK	6	356:49	5	1	135	8	2	94.1	1.35
Salla Sivula^	Ilves	4	239:03	1	3	100	7	0	93.5	1.76
Tiina Ranne	KalPa	8	476:02	4	4	245	17	1	93.1	2.14
Kassidy Sauvé	HPK	8	493:30	3	4	262	19	2	92.7	2.30
Minja Drufva	K-Espoo	1	60:00	1	0	12	1	0	91.7	1.00
Tiia Pajarinen	K-Espoo	9	534:20	6	3	162	14	3	91.4	1.57
Emilia Kyrkkö^	Kuortane	3	194:55	0	2	75	7	0	90.7	2.15
Kati Asikainen^	Kärpät	2	117:22	0	2	65	7	0	90.3	3.58
Olivia Last^	TPS	2	120:00	0	2	103	12	0	89.6	6.00
Suvi Saarinen^	TPS	1	60:00	0	1	71	8	0	88.7	8.00
Kiia Lahtinen	HIFK	5	298:06	4	1	82	11	0	86.6	2.21
Emilia Piekkari^	Kärpät	1	60:00	0	1	36	7	0	80.6	7.00
