= Tiina Ranne =

Finnish ice hockey player (born 1994)

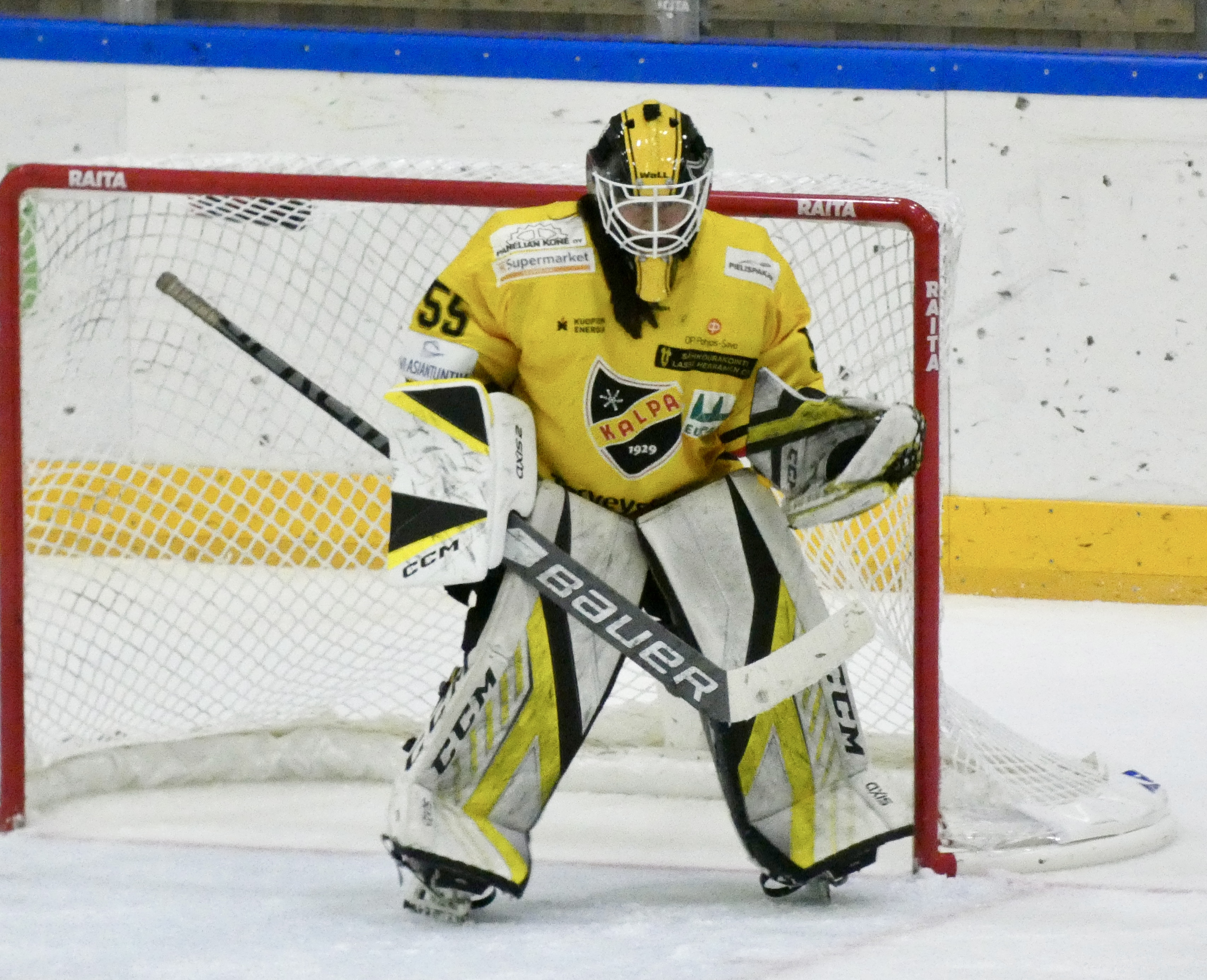
- Ranne in net for KalPa in September 2022
- Born: 6 December 1994 (age 31) Harjavalta, Finland
- Height: 165 cm (5 ft 5 in)
- Weight: 61 kg (134 lb; 9 st 8 lb)
- Position: Goaltender
- Catches: Left
- Auroraliiga team Former teams: Ilves Tampere: KuKi Team; KalPa Kuopio; HPK Hämeenlinna; JYP Jyväskylä; Team Oriflame
- National team: Finland
- Playing career: 2010–present

Tiina Ranne (born 6 December 1994) is a Finnish ice hockey goaltender. She has played with Ilves Tampere in the Auroraliiga since 10 October 2026.

== Playing career ==
Ranne made her elite league debut in the Naisten SM-sarja (rebranded as Naisten Liiga in 2017, Auroraliiga in 2024) during the 2010–11 season with Team Oriflame Kuortane. She played four seasons with Team Oriflame Kuortane and then joined JYP Jyväskylä for the 2014–15 and 2015–16 seasons. She became the starting goaltender for JYP in the 2015–16 season and backstopped the team as they won the 2016 Aurora Borealis Cup.

After playing the 2016–17 season with HPK Hämeenlinna, she signed KalPa Kuopio, with whom she would play for the next seven seasons. During her time with KalPa, Ranne recorded the league's best save percentage in both the 2019–20 season and the 2022–23 season, and was named a second team Naisten Liiga All-Star in 2019–20, 2020–21, and 2022–23. In addition to her individual achievements, she won a Finnish Championship silver medal in 2021 and broze medals in 2023 and 2024 with KalPa.

In the 2024–25 season, Ranne joined TPS Turku. In her first season with the team, she recorded the league's best save percentage for the third time in her career and was named a second team Auroraliiga All-Star.

Ranne began the 2026–27 season with KuKi Team, a team of the club Kuparikiekko, in the Finnish fifth-tier men's league, the III-divisioona. On 10 October 2026, she transferred from KuKi Team to Ilves Tampere, returning to the Auroraliiga.

== International play ==
Ranne was part of the Finnish national team at the 2016 IIHF Women's World Championship but did not play in any games.
