= Julia Schalin =

Finnish ice hockey player (born 2005)

- Born: 31 August 2005 (age 21) Espoo, Finland
- Height: 5 ft 3 in (160 cm)
- Position: Forward
- Shoots: Left
- WCHA team Former teams: Minnesota; Kiekko-Espoo
- National team: Finland
- Playing career: 2020–present

Julia Schalin (born 31 August 2005) is a Finnish college ice hockey player for Minnesota and a member of the Finnish national team. She previously played for Kiekko-Espoo of the Naisten Liiga.

== Playing career ==
Schalin began her ice hockey career for Kiekko-Espoo of the Naisten Liiga, where she contributed to two Finnish Championship victories, in 2021 and 2022, and runner-up finishes in 2023 and 2024.

Schalin began her college ice hockey career with Mercyhurst during the 2024–25 season. During her rookie year she recorded 14 goals and 18 assists in 37 games. She was named the Atlantic Hockey (AHA) Rookie of the Month in November 2024, after she recorded five goals and five assists in eight games. She was named the AHA Rookie of the Month in January 2025 after she recorded four goals and eight assists in ten games. She was again named the AHA Rookie of the Month in February 2025 after she recorded four goals and five assists in seven games. She ranked second in the nation among all rookie scorers, trailing only Mackenzie Alexander. In conference pay, she led all AHA rookies and ranked third among all skaters with 11 goals and 14 assists in 19 games. Following the season she was named to the AHA All-Rookie team and the AHA Rookie of the Year.

During the 2025–26 season, in her sophomore year, she recorded nine goals and 22 assists in 33 games. She ranked third on the team in scoring with 31 points. On 21 April 2026, she transferred to Minnesota.

== International play ==
Medal record

Representing Finland

World Championship
| Bronze medal – third place | 2024 United States | |
| Bronze medal – third place | 2025 Czechia | |

World U18 Championship
| Bronze medal – third place | 2022 United States | |

Schalin represented the Finnish under-18 team at the 2022 IIHF U18 Women's World Championship where she recorded one goal and one assist in five games and won a bronze medal. She again represented Finland at the 2023 IIHF U18 Women's World Championship where recorded one assist in six games.

On 12 March 2024, she was named to the Finnish national team to compete at the 2024 IIHF Women's World Championship, where she was the youngest member of the team at 18 years old. During the tournament she was scoreless in seven games and won a bronze medal.

On 2 January 2026, she was named to Finland's roster to compete at the 2026 Winter Olympics. She recorded one assist in five games during the tournament.

== Personal life ==
Schalin was born to Santtu and Katriina Schalin and has one sibling, Isa.

== Career statistics ==
=== Regular season and playoffs ===
| | | | Regular season | | | | | Playoffs |
| Season | Team | League | GP | G | A | Pts | PIM | GP | G | A | Pts | PIM |
|---|---|---|---|---|---|---|---|---|---|---|---|---|
| 2020–21 | Kiekko-Espoo | NSML | 17 | 1 | 3 | 4 | 14 | 10 | 0 | 0 | 0 | 6 |
| 2021–22 | Kiekko-Espoo | NSML | 22 | 8 | 10 | 18 | 14 | 7 | 1 | 3 | 4 | 0 |
| 2022–23 | Kiekko-Espoo | NSML | 35 | 17 | 13 | 30 | 16 | 11 | 2 | 7 | 9 | 2 |
| 2023–24 | Kiekko-Espoo | NSML | 31 | 11 | 37 | 48 | 8 | 10 | 2 | 7 | 9 | 4 |
| 2024–25 | Mercyhurst University | AHA | 37 | 14 | 18 | 32 | 12 | — | — | — | — | — |
| 2025–26 | Mercyhurst University | AHA | 33 | 9 | 22 | 31 | 10 | — | — | — | — | — |
| NSML totals | | | 105 | 37 | 63 | 100 | 52 | 38 | 5 | 17 | 22 | 12 |
| NCAA totals | | | 70 | 23 | 40 | 63 | 22 | — | — | — | — | — |

=== International ===
| Year | Team | Event | Result | GP | G | A | Pts | PIM |
|---|---|---|---|---|---|---|---|---|
| 2022 | Finland | U18 | 3rd place, bronze medalist(s) | 5 | 1 | 1 | 2 | 8 |
| 2023 | Finland | U18 | 4th | 6 | 0 | 1 | 1 | 2 |
| 2024 | Finland | WC | 3rd place, bronze medalist(s) | 7 | 0 | 0 | 0 | 0 |
| 2025 | Finland | WC | 3rd place, bronze medalist(s) | 7 | 1 | 0 | 1 | 0 |
| 2026 | Finland | OG | 6th | 5 | 0 | 1 | 1 | 2 |
| Junior totals | | | | 11 | 1 | 2 | 3 | 10 |
| Senior totals | | | | 19 | 1 | 1 | 2 | 2 |
