= Sari Fisk Award =

Finnish ice hockey award

Sari Fisk Award Sari Fisk -palkinto (Finnish)
- Sport: Ice hockey
- League: Auroraliiga
- Awarded for: Best plus–minus
- Presented by: Finnish Ice Hockey Association

History
- Most wins: Riikka Noronen (2); Saija Tarkki (2)
- Most recent: Pauliina Salonen, 2026

The Sari Fisk Award or Sari Fisk Trophy (Finnish: Sari Fisk -palkinto) is an ice hockey trophy awarded by the Finnish Ice Hockey Association to the player with the best regular season plus–minus (+/–) in the Auroraliiga.

It is named after Sari Marjamäki née Fisk, who began her career in the Naisten SM-sarja at age thirteen and went on to play 23 seasons in the league. As a member of the Finnish national team, Marjamäki played in the women’s ice hockey tournaments at three Winter Olympic Games, eight IIHF Women's World Championships, and five IIHF European Women Championships. She won bronze at the 1998 Winter Olympics and recorded the highest plus–minus of all the players in the tournament, in addition to winning six World Championship bronze medals and five European Championship medals, four gold and one bronze. Fisk was inducted into the Hockey Hall of Fame Finland as Suomen Jääkiekkoleijona #223 in 2014, the fourth woman to ever receive the honour.

The trophy was named after Marjamäki for the 2010–11 season and was first awarded to Riikka Noronen of HPK Kiekkonaiset. The most Sari Fisk Awards won by a player is two, a record held by both Noronen and Saija Tarkki. Tarkki is the only player to win the trophy consecutively, claiming it in the 2017–18 and 2018–19 seasons. The title is currently held by Pauliina Salonen of IFK Helsinki, winner in the 2025–26 season.

== Award winners ==
Season	Winner	Team	+/–
2010–11	Riikka Noronen	HPK Hämeenlinna	
2011–12	Heidi Pelttari	Ilves Tampere	
2012–13	Heidi Huhtamäki	Blues Espoo	
2013–14	Annina Rajahuhta	Blues Espoo	
2014–15	Saila Saari	JYP Jyväskylä	
2015–16	Minttu Tuominen	Blues Espoo	
2016–17	Riikka Noronen	HPK Hämeenlinna	
2017–18	Saija Tarkki	Kärpät Oulu	
2018–19	Saija Tarkki	Kärpät Oulu	
2019–20	Matilda Nilsson	KalPa Kuopio	
2020–21	Emilia Vesa	Kiekko-Espoo	
2021–22	Kiira Yrjänen	Kiekko-Espoo	
2022–23	Michaela Pejzlová	IFK Helsinki	+66
2023–24	Clara Rozier	IFK Helsinki	+63
2024–25	Ada Eronen	Kiekko-Espoo	+52
2025–26	Pauliina Salonen	IFK Helsinki	+62

Source: Elite Prospects

== All time award recipients ==
Player	Wins	Season(s) won
Riikka Noronen	2	2011, 2017
Saija Tarkki	2	2018, 2019
Ada Eronen	1	2025
Heidi Huhtamäki	1	2013
Matilda Nilsson	1	2020
Michaela Pejzlová	1	2023
Heidi Pelttari	1	2012
Annina Rajahuhta	1	2014
Clara Rozier	1	2024
Saila Saari	1	2015
Pauliina Salonen	1	2026
Minttu Tuominen	1	2016
Emilia Vesa	1	2021
Kiira Yrjänen	1	2022
