= Ada Eronen =

Finnish ice hockey player (born 2004)

- Born: 13 April 2004 (age 22) Espoo, Finland
- Height: 1.70 m (5 ft 7 in)
- Weight: 70 kg (154 lb; 11 st 0 lb)
- Position: Defense
- Shoots: Left
- PFWL team Former teams: SC Bern; Kiekko-Espoo
- National team: Finland
- Playing career: 2018–present

Ada Eronen (born 13 April 2004) is a Finnish professional ice hockey defenceman for SC Bern of the Swiss Women's League (PFWL). She previously played for Kiekko-Espoo of the Auroraliiga.

As a member of Finnish national ice hockey team, she won a bronze medal at the 2025 IIHF Women's World Championship.

== Playing career ==
During the 2023–24 season, Eronen recorded three goals and 22 assists in 29 regular season games. During the 2024 Aurora Borealis Cup playoffs, she recorded one goal and eight assists in ten games, and finished as Aurora Borealis Cup runner-up.

During the 2024–25 season, she recorded six goals and 31 assists in 31 regular season games. Eronen was named the Player of the Month for the month of December 2024. She won the Sari Fisk Award for the best plus-minus in the Auroraliig with a +52. During the 2025 Aurora Borealis Cup playoffs, she recorded one goal and five assists in twelve games, and won the Aurora Borealis Cup.

== International play ==
Medal record

Representing Finland

World Championship
Bronze medal – third place	2025 Czechia	

World U18 Championship
Bronze medal – third place	2022 United States	

Eronen made her international debut with the Finnish national under-18 team at the 2022 IIHF U18 Women's World Championship, where she recorded one goal and one assist in six games and won a bronze medal.

On 26 March 2025, she was selected to represent Finland at the 2025 IIHF Women's World Championship, where she made her senior national team debut. She was scoreless in three games, and won a bronze medal for Finland.

== Career statistics ==
=== Regular season and playoffs ===
			Regular season					Playoffs
Season	Team	League	GP	G	A	Pts	PIM	GP	G	A	Pts	PIM
2018–19	Espoo Blues	NSML	11	0	1	1	4	1	0	0	0	0
2019–20	Kiekko-Espoo	NSML	21	2	3	5	0	5	0	1	1	0
2020–21	Kiekko-Espoo	NSML	23	1	5	6	6	10	0	0	0	4
2021–22	Kiekko-Espoo	NSML	19	1	8	9	4	10	0	0	0	0
2022–23	Kiekko-Espoo	NSML	32	4	15	19	22	11	0	0	0	6
2023–24	Kiekko-Espoo	NSML	29	3	22	25	20	10	1	8	9	4
2024–25	Kiekko-Espoo	Auroraliiga	31	6	31	37	26	12	1	5	6	2
2025–26	Kiekko-Espoo	Auroraliiga	32	6	42	48	16	13	1	10	11	0
Auroraliiga totals			198	23	127	150	98	72	3	24	27	16

=== International ===
Year	Team	Event	Result	GP	G	A	Pts	PIM
2022	Finland	U18	3rd place, bronze medalist(s)	5	1	1	2	0
2025	Finland	WC	3rd place, bronze medalist(s)	3	0	0	0	0
Junior totals				5	1	1	2	0
Senior totals				3	0	0	0	0

== Awards and honors ==
Award	Year
Auroraliiga
Aurora Borealis Cup champion	2019, 2022, 2025, 2026
Sari Fisk Award	2025
Second Team All-Star	2025
First Team All-Star	2026
