= Kuparikiekko =

Harjavallan Kuparikiekko
- City: Harjavalta, Finland
- League: 2. Divisioona
- Founded: 1945
- Home arena: Puustelli Areena (capacity: 650)
- Colours
- General manager: Ari Kulmala
- Head coach: Erno Järvistö
- Captain: Ville-Petteri Mäkinen
- Affiliate: Porin Ässät (SML)

Franchise history
- 1945–1961: Outokummun Urheilukerho
- 1961–present: Kuparikiekko

Championships
- 2. Divisioona West Coast: 1 (2022–23)

Harjavallan Kuparikiekko (KuKi for short, Finnish for 'Harjavalta's Copper Puck') is an ice hockey team located in Harjavalta, Finland. They play their home games in the Puustelli Areena, with a capacity of 650. KuKi competes in the 2. Divisioona West Coast division, in which they have won one championship.

== History ==
Kuparikiekko was established in 1945 as Outokummun Urheilukerho, which became Kuparikiekko in 1961. Outokummun Urheilukerho played its first match on 10th March 1945 against an unknown team from Valkeakoski. In 1947, the team participated in the first ever official hockey game between Satakunta teams when they tied 4–4 against Rauman Lukko. The club also faced the Swedish Hedemora SK in 1950, losing 16–0. Kuparikiekko's 2016–17 season in the 2. Divisioona West Coast ended in second place and silver medals

KuKi won the 2. Divisioona West Coast championship in 2023, but did not try for Suomi-sarja qualification.

== Players ==
=== Notable alumni ===
- Kari Makkonen
- Jouka Juhola
- Juho Vanhala (known as a sprinter)
