= Michaela Pejzlová =

Czech ice hockey player (born 1997)

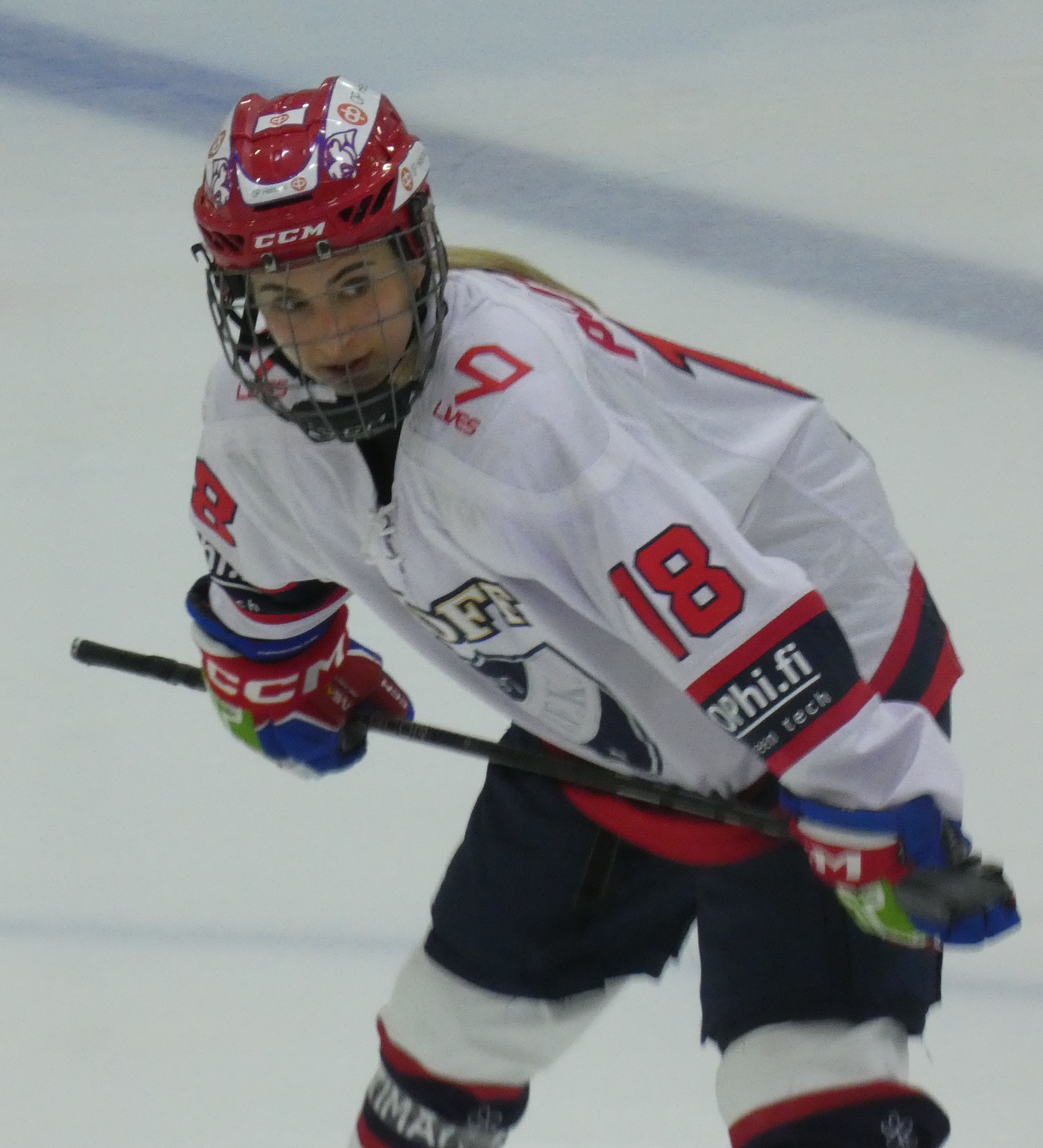
- Pejzlová in 2023
- Born: 6 April 1997 (age 29) Pardubice, Czech Republic
- Height: 1.70 m (5 ft 7 in)
- Weight: 64 kg (141 lb; 10 st 1 lb)
- Position: Centre
- Shoots: Left
- SDHL team Former teams: Frölunda HC: HCAP Girls; IFK Helsinki; Clarkson Golden Knights; HC Pardubice
- National team: Czech Republic
- Playing career: 2011–present
Medal record
World Championship
Bronze medal – third place	2022 Denmark
Bronze medal – third place	2023 Canada

Michaela "Míša" Pejzlová (born 6 April 1997) is a Czech ice hockey player and member of the Czech national team. She has played with Frölunda HC in the Swedish Women's Hockey League (SDHL) since August 2026. Her college ice hockey career was played with the Clarkson Golden Knights of ECAC Hockey, with whom she twice won the NCAA Championship.

== Playing career ==
Pejzlová started her career playing with HC Pardubice of the Czech Women's Extraliga before joining the Czech U18 national team and later the Czech senior national team. She attended Stanstead College in Stanstead, Quebec, Canada, during her final years of secondary school and played two seasons with the Stanstead Spartans girls' ice hockey team.

=== College ===
==== Freshman year ====
Pejzlová joined a talented Clarkson team that had won the National Championship three years previously and made the NCAA Tournament four straight seasons. She quickly established herself as a key contributor, splitting time between the top two lines. She scored in her first career game against Penn State on 9 September 2016 at 6:01 of the second period. Pejzlová recorded 11 goals and 21 assists as the team's highest-scoring rookie en route to Clarkson's second National Championship.

2016–17 Awards

ECAC Rookie of the Week (twice)
ECAC Rookie of the Month (October, November)
ECAC Weekly Honor Roll (Five Times)
Windjammer Classic All-Tournament Team

==== Sophomore year ====
Pejzlová played the majority of the 2017–18 season centering Loren Gabel and Élizabeth Giguère on Clarkson's top line as well as centering the pair on the top power play unit. Pejzlová put up 26 goals and 29 assists and had a 15-game point streak during the regular season. With the top line leading the way, Clarkson won its second straight National Championship.

2017–2018 Awards

ECAC Weekly Honor Roll (twice)

=== Elite leagues ===
Pejzlová played in the Swiss Women's League (PFWL) with Hockey Club Ambrì-Piotta Girls (HCAP Girls) during the 2024–25 and 2025–26 seasons. She was signed to continue with the club for the 2026–27 PFWL season but the team unexpectedly withdrew from the league in late July 2026 and players under contract were left to find new teams on very short notice. Pejzlová and HCAP teammate Julia Liikala soon thereafter signed with Frölunda HC in the Swedish Women's Hockey League for the 2026–26 SDHL season.

== International play ==
Pejzlová represented the Czech Republic at the IIHF Women's World Championships in 2016, 2017, 2019, 2021, 2022, 2023, and 2024, and at the Division I Group A tournament in 2015.

== Career statistics ==
=== Regular season and playoffs ===
			Regular season					Playoffs
Season	Team	League	GP	G	A	Pts	PIM	GP	G	A	Pts	PIM
2011–12	HC Pardubice B U16	Liga dorostu	6	2	3	5	2	–	–	–	–	–
2011–12	HC Pardubice	Extraliga žen	14	6	5	11	31	–	–	–	–	–
2014–15	Stanstead Spartans	CAHS						–	–	–	–	–
2015–16	Stanstead Spartans	CAHS						–	–	–	–	–
2016–17	Clarkson University	NCAA	37	11	21	32	16	–	–	–	–	–
2017–18	Clarkson University	NCAA	41	26	29	55	16	–	–	–	–	–
2018–19	Clarkson University	NCAA	40	19	36	55	12	–	–	–	–	–
2019–20	Clarkson University	NCAA	30	8	16	24	6	–	–	–	–	–
2020–21	HIFK	NSML	22	17	20	37	0	8	3	7	10	8
2021–22	HIFK	NSML	21	15	27	42	8	12	10	7	17	2
2022–23	HIFK	NSML	31	32	50	82	2	9	11	13	24	2
2023–24	HIFK	NSML	24	30	41	71	4	7	2	5	7	0
NCAA totals			148	64	102	166	50	–	–	–	–	–
Naisten Liiga totals			98	94	138	232	14	36	26	32	58	12

=== International ===
Year	Team	Event	Result	GP	G	A	Pts	PIM
2013	Czechia	WC18	4th	6	2	0	2	2
2015	Czechia	WC18	4th	5	2	2	4	0
2015	Czechia	WC Q	DNQ	3	0	0	0	0
2015	Czechia	WC D1A	1st	5	0	1	1	0
2016	Czechia	WC	6th	5	0	0	0	4
2017	Czechia	OGQ	DNQ	3	1	2	3	2
2017	Czechia	WC	8th	6	1	0	1	0
2019	Czechia	WC	6th	5	0	1	1	0
2021	Czechia	WC	7th	6	0	0	0	0
2022	Czechia	OG	7th	5	2	0	2	2
2022	Czechia	WC	3rd place, bronze medalist(s)	7	1	1	2	4
2023	Czechia	WC	3rd place, bronze medalist(s)	7	2	1	3	2
2024	Czechia	WC	4th	7	1	2	3	0
2025	Czechia	WC	4th	6	0	1	1	2
2026	Czechia	OG	5th	4	0	0	0	0
Junior totals				11	4	2	6	2
Senior totals				69	8	9	17	16

== Awards and honors ==
Award	Year
International
World U18 Top-3 Player on Team	2015
World Championship Bronze Medal	2022
World Championship Bronze Medal	2023
College
ECAC All-Tournament Team	2016–17
NCAA Tournament Champion	2017
NCAA Tournament Champion	2018
ECAC Tournament Most Outstanding Player	2017–18
Naisten Liiga
Marianne Ihalainen Award (Most points)	2020–21
Marianne Ihalainen Award (Most points)	2022–23
Marianne Ihalainen Award (Most points)	2023–24
All-Star, Second Team	2020–21
All-Star, Second Team	2021–22
Finnish Championship Bronze Medal	2021
Finnish Championship Silver Medal	2022
Sari Fisk Award (Best plus–minus)	2022–23
Student Athlete of the Year	2022–23
All-Star, First Team	2022–23
All-Star, First Team	2023–24
Aurora Borealis Cup Champion	2023
Aurora Borealis Cup Champion	2024
Player of the Month	January 2024
Other
Czech Women's Player of the Year	2022–23
