= Windjammer Classic =

NCAA ice hockey tournament

Tournament information
- Sport: Ice hockey
- Location: Burlington, Vermont
- Month played: November
- Established: 2015
- Defunct: 2019
- Format: Single-elimination
- Teams: 4

Final champion
- Clarkson Golden Knights

The Windjammer Classic was an annual ice hockey tournament for college hockey teams, hosted by the University of Vermont and featuring one team from each of the other three NCAA Division I women's hockey conferences: College Hockey America (CHA), ECAC Hockey, and Western Collegiate Hockey Association (WCHA). The tournament was sponsored by The Windjammer and Upper Deck Pub in Burlington Vermont. The final edition took place in 2019, won by the Clarkson Golden Knights.

== Format ==
The tournament lasts two rounds, with first-round opponents being rotated from year to year. The second round features the consolation game and the championship game. The lone exception was the inaugural tournament in 2015 which featured pre-determined games and determined a champion by record and goal differential.

The competitors are:

- University of Vermont Catamounts
- A team from College Hockey America. Previous representatives, by year:
  - 2019: Penn State Nittany Lions
  - 2018: Syracuse Orange
  - 2017: Rochester Institute of Technology Tigers
  - 2016: Robert Morris Colonials
  - 2015: No CHA Team. The CHA representative was replaced by the Women's Hockey East Association (WHEA)'s Boston University Terriers
- A team from the Eastern Collegiate Athletic Conference (ECAC). Previous representatives, by year:
  - 2019: Clarkson Golden Knights
  - 2018: St. Lawrence Saints
  - 2017: Colgate Raiders
  - 2016: Clarkson Golden Knights
  - 2015: Cornell Big Red
- A team from the Western Collegiate Hockey Association (WCHA). Previous representatives, by year:
  - 2019: Minnesota State Mavericks
  - 2018: Minnesota Golden Gophers
  - 2017: Minnesota Duluth Bulldogs
  - 2016: St. Cloud State Huskies
  - 2015: Ohio State Buckeyes

The tournament lasts two rounds, with first-round opponents being rotated from year to year. The second round features the consolation game and the championship game.

== History ==
The Windjammer Classic tournament was founded in 2015 and has typically hosted one team from each conference outside Hockey East with the University of Vermont hosting. The first tournament featured pre-determined games with wins and goal differential determining the champion. All tournaments since then have featured a standard single-elimination bracket with the two winners from the first matches squaring off in the final the following day. The two first-day losers play a consolation game on the second day. Cornell won the inaugural Windjammer Classic with Clarkson winning in 2016 and 2019, Minnesota Duluth in 2017, and Minnesota in 2018. Vermont has never won the Windjammer Classic, falling in the final in the first three tournaments.

== All-time results ==
Four games are listed for each Windjammer Classic, in the order they were played. There are two opening round games, a consolation game featuring the losers of the first two games, and a championship game featuring the winners of the first two games. Note that the 2015 Windjammer Classic did not follow a tournament format and instead had four pre-determined games.

Edition	Year	First Game	Second Game	Consolation	Final
4th	2018	Minnesota 8 St. Lawrence 2	Vermont 2 Syracuse 0	St. Lawrence 4 Syracuse 0	Minnesota 6 Vermont 2
3rd	2017	Minnesota-Duluth 4 Colgate 1	Vermont 1* RIT 1; *Vermont wins shootout 1-0	Colgate 6 RIT 1	Minnesota-Duluth 2 Vermont 1
2nd	2016	Vermont 5 St. Cloud State 1	Clarkson 3* Robert Morris 3; *Clarkson wins shootout 2-1	Robert Morris 5 St. Cloud State 3	Clarkson 3 Vermont 1
1st	2015	Cornell 4 Boston University 2	Ohio State 5 Vermont 2	Boston University 5 Ohio State 3	Cornell 4 Vermont 0

Note: For the 2015 Windjammer Classic, the standings have been determined by the following criteria: record, head to head, goal differential. Thus the standings are as follows:

1. Cornell (2–0)
2. Boston University (1–1, defeated Ohio State)
3. Ohio State (1–1)
4. Vermont (0–2)

== Team statistics ==
Through the 2018 Windjammer Classic, the invitees have amassed the following statistics:

Team	Wins	Losses	Goals For	Goals Against	+/-	1st	2nd	3rd	4th
Minnesota	2	0	14	4	+10	1	0	0	0
Cornell	2	0	8	2	+6	1	0	0	0
Minnesota-Duluth	2	0	6	2	+4	1	0	0	0
Clarkson	2	0	6	4	+2	1	0	0	0
Robert Morris	1	1	8	6	+2	0	0	1	0
Colgate	1	1	7	5	+2	0	0	1	0
Ohio State	1	1	8	7	+1	0	0	1	0
Boston University	1	1	7	7	-	0	1	0	0
St. Lawrence	1	1	6	8	-2	0	0	1	0
Vermont	3	5	14	22	-8	0	3	0	1
RIT	0	2	2	7	-5	0	0	0	1
St. Cloud State	0	2	4	10	-6	0	0	0	1
Syracuse	0	2	0	6	-6	0	0	0	1

== All-tournament teams ==
=== 2019 ===
- G - Marie-Pier Coulombe, Clarkson
- D - Sini Karjalainen, Vermont
- D - Anna Wilgren, Minnesota State
- F - Mallory Uihlein, Penn State
- F - Kayla Friesen, Clarkson
- F - Élizabeth Giguère, Clarkson (MVP)

=== 2018 ===
- G - Alex Gulstene, Minnesota
- D - Sammy Kolowrat, Vermont
- F - Kristina Shanahan, Vermont
- F - Rachael Smith, St. Lawrence
- F - Taylor Heise, Minnesota
- F - Kelly Pannek, Minnesota (MVP)

=== 2017 ===
- G - Jessica Convery, Minnesota Duluth
- D -
- D -
- F -
- F - Naomi Rogge, Minnesota Duluth
- F - Emma Yanko, Minnesota Duluth (MVP)

=== 2016 ===
- G - Madison Litchfield, Vermont
- D -
- F - Bridget Baker, Vermont
- F - Jaycee Gebhard, Robert Morris
- F - Michaela Pejzlová, Clarkson
- F - Cassidy Vinkle, Clarkson (MVP)

=== 2015 ===
- G - Marlène Boissonnault, Cornell
- D - Dani Sadek, Ohio State
- D - Cassandra Poudrier, Cornell (MVP)
- F - Victoria Bach, Boston University
- F - Pippy Gerace, Cornell
- F - Taylor Woods, Cornell
