= Jouka Juhola =

Finnish ice hockey player

- Born: 14 July 1997 (age 28) Harjavalta, Finland
- Height: 182 cm (6 ft 0 in)
- Weight: 99 kg (218 lb; 15 st 8 lb)
- Position: Forward
- Shoots: Left
- team Former teams: Free agent Ässät; Nybro Vikings; HK Poprad
- Playing career: 2016–present

Jouka Juhola (born 14 July 1997) is a Finnish ice hockey player. He is currently a free agent.

== Career ==
Juhola has played in Ässät since 2017. He has played 132 games there and has 27 points. (regular season)

== Career statistics ==
=== Regular season and playoffs ===
			Regular season					Playoffs
Season	Team	League	GP	G	A	Pts	PIM	GP	G	A	Pts	PIM
