= Kassidy Sauvé =

Canadian ice hockey goaltender

- Born: May 19, 1996 (age 30) Whitby, Ontario, Canada
- Height: 175 cm (5 ft 9 in)
- Weight: 66 kg (146 lb; 10 st 6 lb)
- Position: Goaltender
- Catches: Left
- PWHL team Former teams: Toronto Sceptres: HPK Hämeenlinna; Buffalo Beauts; Team Sonnet (PWHPA); Team Scotiabank (PWHPA); Clarkson Golden Knights; Ohio State Buckeyes; SDE Hockey
- Coached for: Brown Bears (goalie coach)
- Playing career: 2014–present
- Coaching career: 2019–present

Kassidy Sauvé (born May 19, 1996) is a Canadian ice hockey goaltender. She is signed in the Swedish Women's Hockey League (SDHL) with SDE Hockey through the 2025–26 season, and is concurrently signed in the Professional Women's Hockey League (PWHL) with the Toronto Sceptres during the latter part of their 2025 season on an emergency basis due to a player injury.

She previously played in the Premier Hockey Federation (PHF) with the Buffalo Beauts, the Finnish Naisten Liiga (NSML) with HPK Hämeenlinna, and was affiliated with the Professional Women's Hockey Players Association (PWHPA), representing the organization in showcases with the Calgary chapter, as Team Scotiabank, and the Toronto chapter, as Team Sonnet.

== Playing career ==
As a teenager, Sauvé played for the Whitby Wildcats in the boys' Eastern AAA Hockey League, making it to the 2012 OHL Cup.

=== NCAA ===
From 2014 to 2018, she played with the Ohio State Buckeyes women's ice hockey program in the Western Collegiate Hockey Association (WCHA) conference of the NCAA Division I. She missed the latter half of the 2014–15 season and the entire 2015–16 season recovering from surgery after suffering a number of hip and leg injures, including a bone lesion on her femur. Across 88 games in three seasons with Ohio State, she posted 22 shutouts, a university record.

After graduating from Ohio State University, she joined the Clarkson Golden Knights women's ice hockey program in the ECAC Hockey conference of the NCAA Division I for the 2018–19 season as a postgraduate player. Posting a .937 save percentage (SV%) with Clarkson and setting a university record for saves, she was named to the ECAC Third All-Star Team and was twice named ECAC Goaltender of the Month.

=== Professional ===
PWHPA

After graduating, she joined the PWHPA and spent the 2019–20 season with the organisation's New England hub. She made her PWHPA debut at the Dunkin' Showcase in Hudson, New Hampshire in October 2019, winning the showcase with Team Stecklein. She then played for Team Turnbull at the Philadelphia showcase in February 2020. She remained with the PWHPA for the 2020–21 season, being named to the roster for the Calgary hub, dubbed Team Scotiabank. In the 2021–22 season, she joined the Toronto hub, Team Sonnet.

Naisten Liiga

In January 2022, Sauvé signed with the Naisten Liiga team HPK Naiset in Hämeenlinna, Finland, filling the vacancy created by the departure of Noora Räty to the Zhenskaya Hockey League. She recorded the best save percentage and goals against average (GAA) of all goaltenders in the lower division series, a .964 SV% and 0.88 GAA, buoying the team to the top of the division and securing a playoff berth. HPK lost the quarterfinals of the Aurora Borealis Cup playoffs in a four-game series against HIFK despite Sauvé's league-leading .955 SV% and highly competitive 2.29 GAA. Though she spent only a few months in Finland, Sauvé credited the time in the Naisten Liiga with reinvigorating her childhood love of ice hockey.

PHF

Returning to North America after the half-season in Finland, Sauvé signed with the Buffalo Beauts as their starting goaltender for the 2022–23 PHF season. Her official debut with the team was delayed until December 2022 after she sustained a hip injury in a pre-season exhibition match. In her third game of the season, the injury was aggravated and she was placed on the injured reserve list. In January 2023, she was moved to the long-term injured reserve (LTIR) list after it was determined that her hip required surgery; rehabilitation kept her from playing another game in the 2022–23 season.

Despite effectively losing the previous season to injury, she remained a highly touted netminder and was signed for the 2023–24 PHF season by the Boston Pride in mid-June 2023. The contract was on the books for less than two weeks before the PHF was sold and subsequently dissolved to make way for the Professional Women's Hockey League (PWHL) on 29 June 2023, voiding all PHF contracts.

PWHL

Sauvé was one of 44 goaltenders to declare themselves eligible for the 2023 PWHL Draft, though she was not one of the ninety players who were drafted (only eight of whom were goalies). Following the draft, she accepted an invitation to attend training camp with PWHL New York. On November 30, 2023, PWHL New York cut her in the first round of roster reductions.

Return to Europe

Shortly after being cut from PWHL New York, she signed with HPK Hämeenlinna in the Naisten Liiga for the remainder of the 2023–24 season. She backstopped the team to a fourth place finish in the 2024 Aurora Borealis Cup playoffs and her .927 save percentage was third of all goaltenders playing four or more playoff games.

Sauvé signed a two-season contract in the SDHL with SDE Hockey in April 2024.

Return to the PWHL

After the conclusion of the 2024–25 SDHL season, Sauvé signed a standard player agreement with the Toronto Sceptres after their backup goalie Raygan Kirk was placed on the long-term injury reserve list with a lower-body injury.

== International career ==
As a junior player with the Canadian national under-18 team, Sauvé participated in the 2014 IIHF World Women's U18 Championship. She played in two of Canada's five games, maintaining an exemplary 0.50 GAA and .978 save percentage as the country won gold.

== Personal life ==
Sauvé has a Master of Business Administration from Clarkson University and a bachelor's degree in sports industry from Ohio State University.

Through her paternal grandmother (née Vezina), she is distantly related to former NHL goaltender Georges Vézina.
