= Tereza Pištěková =

Czech ice hockey player (born 2005)

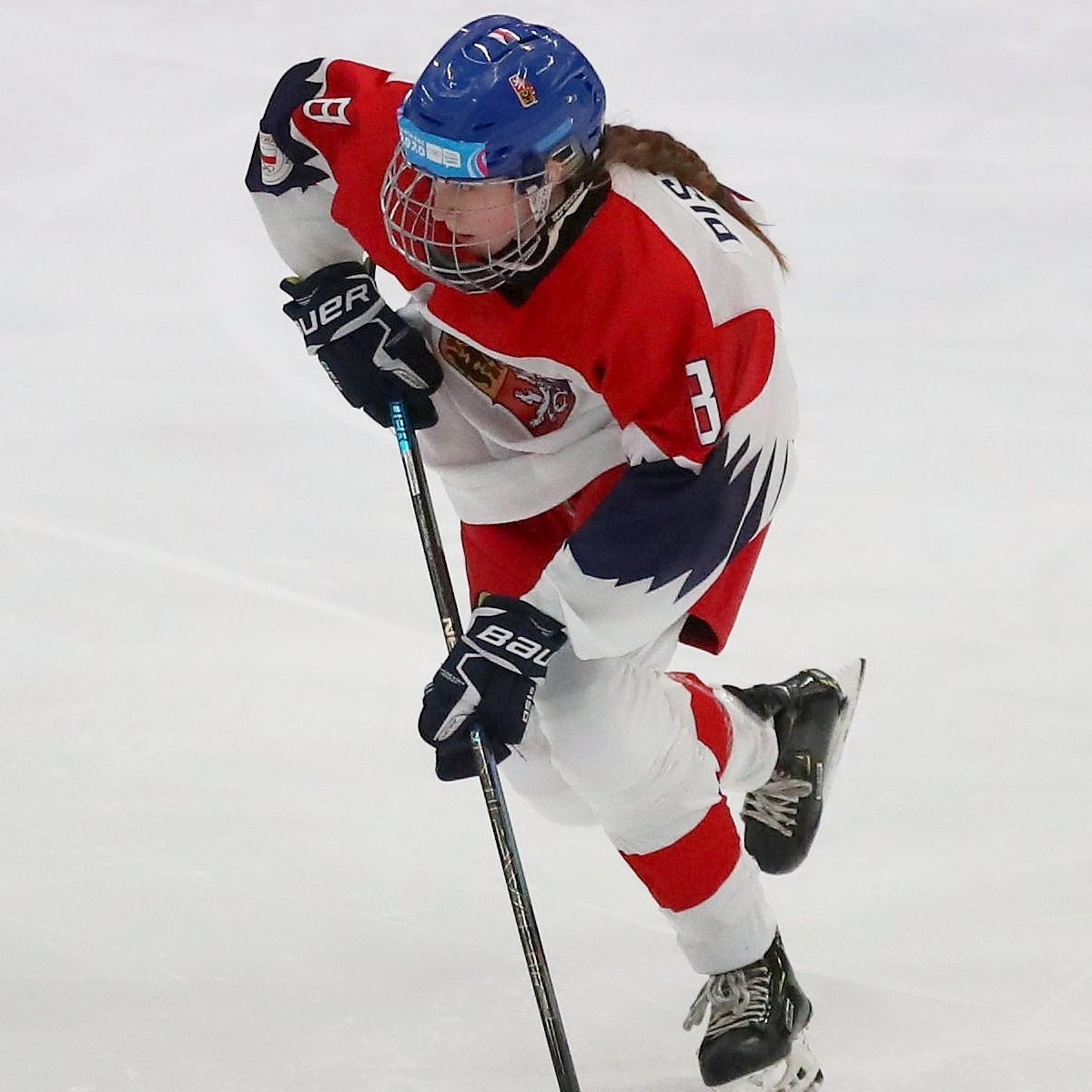
- Pištěková at the 2020 Winter Youth Olympics
- Born: 3 June 2005 (age 21) Tábor, Czech Republic
- Height: 171 cm (5 ft 7 in)
- Weight: 60 kg (132 lb; 9 st 6 lb)
- Position: Forward
- Shoots: Left
- SDHL team Former teams: Djurgårdens IF: HPK Hämeenlinna; TPS Turku; ŽHC Příbram
- National team: Czech Republic
- Playing career: 2022–present
Medal record
World Championship
Bronze medal – third place	2023 Canada

Tereza Pištěková (born 3 June 2005) is a Czech ice hockey player for Djurgårdens IF of the Swedish Women's Hockey League (SDHL) and a member of the Czech Republic women's national ice hockey team. She previously played for TPS and HPK of the Finnish Naisten Liiga (NSML).

== Early life ==
Pištěková was born in Tábor, and raised in Milevsko, until she was four years old and moved to České Budějovice.

== Playing career ==
Pištěková began her ice hockey career for TPS during the 2022–23 season, where she recorded 14 goals and 26 assists in 34 games. She then joined HPK for the 2023–24 season, where she recorded 11 goals and 24 assists in 32 games.

On 30 July 2024, she signed with Djurgårdens IF of the SDHL, after two seasons in the NSML. During the 2024–25 season, she recorded six goals and 18 assists in 35 games.

Pištěková declared for the draft of the Professional Women's Hockey League (PWHL) in 2026. She was selected in the third-round by the Ottawa Charge. She was the youngest selected player from the draft and will become the youngest player in the league, if signed by the Charge.

== International play ==
Pištěková represented the Czech Republic at the IIHF U18 Women's World Championship in 2022 and 2023, where she recorded five goals and five assists in nine games.

On 20 March 2023, she was selected to represent the Czech Republic at the 2023 IIHF Women's World Championship, where she made her senior national team debut. During the tournament she recorded one goal in seven games and won a bronze medal.

She has since played in 2024, and 2025 IIHF Women's World Championship. On November 1 2026, it was announced she is on the roster for the 2026 IIHF Women's World Championship.

== Career statistics ==
=== Regular season and playoffs ===
			Regular season					Playoffs
Season	Team	League	GP	G	A	Pts	PIM	GP	G	A	Pts	PIM
2022–23	TPS	NSML	34	14	26	40	8	3	1	2	3	0
2023–24	HPK	NSML	32	11	24	35	12	8	3	6	9	4
2024–25	Djurgårdens IF	SDHL	35	6	18	24	14	4	0	1	1	2
Naisten Liiga totals			66	25	50	75	20	11	4	8	12	4
SDHL totals			35	6	18	24	14	4	0	1	1	2

=== International ===
Year	Team	Event	Result	GP	G	A	Pts	PIM
2022	Czech Republic	U18	5th	5	4	4	8	0
2023	Czech Republic	U18	5th	4	1	1	2	2
2023	Czech Republic	WC	3rd place, bronze medalist(s)	7	1	0	1	0
2024	Czech Republic	WC	4th	7	0	0	0	0
2025	Czech Republic	WC	4th	7	1	0	1	2
2026	Czech Republic	OG	5th	5	1	0	1	2
Junior totals				9	5	5	10	2
Senior totals				26	3	0	3	4
