= Barbora Juříčková =

Czech ice hockey player (born 2006)

- Born: 21 October 2006 (age 20) Ostrava, Czech Republic
- Height: 168 cm (5 ft 6 in)
- Weight: 60 kg (132 lb; 9 st 6 lb)
- Position: Forward
- Shoots: Left
- NCAA team Former teams: St. Lawrence Saints; ŽHC Uničov; HPK Hämeenlinna
- National team: Czech Republic
- Playing career: 2022–present

Barbora Juříčková (born 21 October 2006) is a Czech ice hockey player and member of the Czech national ice hockey team. She has played with HPK Hämeenlinna in the Finnish Auroraliiga since 2022.

== Playing career ==
Juříčková spent her minor ice hockey years primarily playing with boys' teams in the Czech Republic. She began intermittently playing with the women's team of HC Uničov in the B league of the 1. liga žen in her early teens, though the boys' teams remained her priority.

At age fifteen, she relocated to Hämeenlinna, Finland to play with HPK in the Finnish championship league, the Naisten Liiga (NSML; renamed Auroraliiga in 2024). In addition to moving away from home and joining a team in which she struggled with the primary languages spoken (English and Finnish), Juříčková was the youngest player on the HPK roster during the 2022–23 season. Despite the many challenges during her first season in Finland, she was supported by her father, who relocated with her, and her new teammates, including other international imports on HPK like Czech forward Karolína Erbanová.

Juříčková demonstrated strong offensive development in Finland, more than doubling her previous point totals season over season. After scoring a modest 9 points (3 goals + 6 assists) in her first season, she tallied 19 points (11+8) in the 2023–24 season. Her breakout season came in 2024–25, in which she ranked fourth in the league for scoring, with 55 points (21+34) in 32 games, and was named to the Auroraliiga All-Star team.

Juříčková is committed to beginning her college ice hockey career with the St. Lawrence Saints women's ice hockey program in the ECAC Hockey conference of the NCAA Division I in the 2026–27 season.

== International play ==
Juříčková represented the Czech Republic with a team of under-17 players in the girls' ice hockey tournament at the 2022 European Youth Olympic Winter Festival. She served as an alternate captain and recorded one goal across three games as the Czech Republic won gold.

As a junior player with the Czech national under-18 team, she participated in the IIHF U18 Women's World Championship in 2022, 2023, and 2024. She was selected by the coaches as a top-three player on the Czech team in 2023 and served as an alternate captain to the silver medal winning team in 2024.

The 2023–24 Women's Euro Hockey Tour provided her first experience with the senior national team and she played in three of four EHT tournaments that season, recording one assist in eleven games. The following season, she was selected to play in all four EHT tournaments and recorded her first national team goal at the 3-Nations Tournament in Liberec against Finland.

She made her major tournament debut with the senior national team at the 2025 IIHF Women's World Championship, posting one assist across seven games.

In January 2026, she was named to the Czech roster for the women's ice hockey tournament at the 2026 Winter Olympics. She scored Czech Republic's first goal of the tournament in the preliminary round game against the United States and notched an assist in the preliminary round game against Finland.

== Personal life ==
Her older brother, Filip Juříček (born 2004), is also an ice hockey player, a forward. He played in the Finnish junior leagues and began his college ice hockey career with the St. Lawrence Saints men's ice hockey program in the 2025–26 season.

== Career statistics ==
=== Regular season and playoffs ===
			Regular season					Playoffs
Season	Team	League	GP	G	A	Pts	PIM	GP	G	A	Pts	PIM
2022-23	HPK	NSML	32	3	6	9	8	8	0	2	2	2
2023-24	HPK	NSML	27	11	8	19	24	8	1	1	2	18
2024-25	HPK	Auroraliiga	32	21	34	55	12	14	4	3	7	0
Auroraliiga/NSML totals			91	35	48	83	44	30	5	6	11	20

=== International ===
Year	Team	Event	Result	GP	G	A	Pts	PIM
2022	Czechia	EYOF	1st place, gold medalist(s)	3	1	0	1	2
2022	Czechia	WC18	5th	5	0	1	1	2
2023	Czechia	WC18	5th	5	1	0	1	8
2024	Czechia	WC18	2nd place, silver medalist(s)	6	0	1	1	0
2025	Czechia	WC	4th	7	0	1	1	0
2026	Czechia	OG	5th	5	1	1	2	4
U18 totals				16	1	2	3	10
Senior totals				12	1	2	3	4
