= 2022–23 Naisten Liiga season =

40th ice hockey season of the Naisten Liiga

- League: Naisten Liiga
- Sport: Ice hockey
- Defending champions: Kiekko-Espoo (2021–22)
- Duration: 10 September 2022 – 19 February 2023; Playoffs; 25 February 2023 – 21 March 2023; Qualification; 18 March 2023 – 2 April 2023
- Games: 36
- Teams: 10
- TV partner: Leijonat.tv

Regular Season
- Season champions: HIFK Helsinki
- Runners-up: KalPa Kuopio
- Top scorer: Michaela Pejzlová (HIFK)

Playoffs
- Playoffs MVP: Sanni Vanhanen (HIFK)

Aurora Borealis Cup
- Champions: HIFK Helsinki
- Runners-up: Kiekko-Espoo

Naisten Liiga seasons
- ← 2021–22 2023–24 →

The 2022–23 Naisten Liiga season was the fortieth season of the Naisten Liiga, the premier level of women's ice hockey in Finland, since the league's establishment as the Naisten SM-sarja in 1982. The regular season began on 10 September 2022 and concluded on 19 February 2023.

HIFK Helsinki and KalPa Kuopio both finished the regular season at the top of the league, tied with 93 points in 36 games. HIFK were granted the regular season championship title by virtue of a higher goal difference, marking the first regular season victory in team history. Kiekko-Espoo, the reigning regular season champions from the previous four seasons (2018–19 to 2021–22), finished in third place.

HIFK swept all three rounds of the 2023 Aurora Borealis Cup playoffs to win the Aurora Borealis Cup for the first time in team history. Kiekko-Espoo, the reigning Finnish Champions from the 2022 Aurora Borealis Cup playoffs, claimed the franchise's third Finnish Championship silver medal and KalPa won Finnish Championship bronze for the fourth time.

In the qualification, RoKi Rovaniemi and Rauman Lukko overcame Naisten Mestis teams HIFK Akatemia and Kiekko-Espoo Akatemia to save themselves from relegation.

== League business ==
=== Season format ===
The Finnish Ice Hockey Association chose to streamline the Naisten Liiga season format after the 2021–22 season. Instead of the previous twenty-game preliminary series and ten-game divisional series, the ten teams play a single-series, four-cycle round-robin. For each team, the regular season comprises 36 games.

The top eight teams at the end of the season qualify for the Aurora Borealis Cup playoffs. The teams finishing the season ranked ninth and tenth play a promotion/relegation series against the top two teams of the Naisten Mestis.

The format change adds six games per team to the regular season schedule and matches the season structure of the league's closest neighbor, the Swedish Women's Hockey League (SDHL).

=== Offseason ===
==== Coaching changes ====
| Team | 2021–22 | 2022–23 | Details |
Off–season
| HPK | Harri Nummela | Jari Risku | Appointed in April 2022, Risku is the fifth HPK head coach in as many seasons. He succeeds Nummela, who piloted the team to a playoff berth from the lower division series. Risku most recently served as head coach of the Austrian national team for the 2022 IIHF Women's World Championship Division I Group A and was previously head coach of KMH Budapest in the European Women's Hockey League (EWHL). He was the inaugural head coach of Team Kuortane, from the team's creation in 2010 until 2018, and coached the Finnish national under-18 team during 2014 to 2018. |
| Ilves | Linda Leppänen | Marjo Voutilainen | Leppänen announced in early April that she was stepping away from her head coaching position after two seasons in role to spend more time with her family. In early May, Ilves revealed that Voutilainen had been selected as her successor. Voutilainen previously coached KalPa Naiset for six seasons, 2016 to 2022, and the team won their first Finnish Championship silver medal and made it to the Aurora Borealis Cup finals twice with her at the helm. Prior to her coaching career, she was a forward with the Finnish national team and an Olympic and World Championship medalist. |
| KalPa | Marjo Voutilainen | Mika Väärälä | Following a challenging season in which KalPa narrowly secured the bottom seed of the playoffs after winning Finnish Championship silver one season before, the club opted not to resign Voutalainen as head coach and to instead pursue a new direction with the hire of Väärälä. Väärälä joined KalPa after serving as head coach of KMH Budapest for three seasons, during which the team won the EWHL Championship three times and the EWHL Super Cup twice. He has been an assistant coach to the Hungarian national team since 2016. |
| Kärpät | Samuli Hassi | Sanna Lankosaari | Hassi vacated the Kärpät head coach position after accepting a director of coaching position with Vaasan Sport U18 in the U18 SM-sarja. Lankosaari was promoted to head coach from assistant coach, a position she had held since 2018. Prior to her coaching career, Lankosaari was a forward with the Finnish national team and won a bronze medal in the inaugural Olympic women's ice hockey tournament at the 1998 Winter Olympics. She was also a three-time IIHF Women's World Championship bronze medalist and was Finland’s leading scorer at the 1996 IIHF European Women Championships. She played seven seasons with Oulun Kärpät Naiset in the Naisten SM-sarja during 1994 to 2001. |

==== Player signings ====
Note: This section does not record all player signings. It is limited to player movements involving national team players (from any country), international import players, and extra-league signings.

Preseason

The 2022 Aurora Borealis Cup champions, Kiekko-Espoo, saw the single largest number of pre-season player departures, with a majority of departures involving Finnish national team players. Players from Kiekko-Espoo departing for other leagues included reigning Päivi Halonen Award winner and Playoff MVP Nelli Laitinen, who left to pursue a college ice hockey career with the Minnesota Golden Gophers; Ella Viitasuo and Kiira Yrjänen, who signed in the Swedish Women's Hockey League (SDHL) with HV71 Dam; and Minttu Tuominen, who began the 2021–22 season as captain of Kiekko-Espoo but concluded the season in the Zhenskaya Hockey League (ZhHL) with the KRS Vanke Rays and signed in the Premier Hockey Federation (PHF) with the Metropolitan Riveters for the 2022–23 season. Several high-impact Kiekko-Espoo players signed with other Naisten Liiga teams, including reigning Best Forward for four consecutive seasons Elisa Holopainen and All-Star Sanni Rantala, who both signed with KalPa; Emilia Vesa, who signed with HIFK; and Emmi Leinonen, who retired from playing and joined HPK as an assistant coach.

HPK celebrated the career of all-time Naisten Liiga top point scorer and most games played record holder Riikka Noronen, who retired from playing in 2022 after 27 consecutive seasons in the league. The vacancy left by Noronen’s departure and other player movements made it possible for HPK to attract a number of international players, including Olympic medalist in speed skating and Czech national team forward Karolína Erbanová, Czech national under-18 team forward Barbora Juříčková, and Slovak national team centre Lucia Záborská. French national team goaltender Margaux Mameri was signed to replace Canadian Kassidy Sauvé, who departed HPK to sign in the PHF with the Buffalo Beauts. Sauvé had signed in the middle of the 2021–22 season as successor to starting netminder Noora Räty, who left HPK in January to rejoin the KRS Vanke Rays in the ZhHL.

KalPa also bid farewell to a franchise star with the retirement of their captain, the 2020 Player of the Year winner and a three-time All-Star, Tanja Niskanen. In addition to signing national team players Holopainen and Rantala from Kiekko-Espoo, KalPa attracted Finnish goaltender Aino Laitinen from the Budapest Jégkorong Akadémia of the European Women's Hockey League (EWHL).

TPS boasted both the 2021–22 regular season top point scorer in French national team centre Estelle Duvin, and the player with the most regular season assists in Maija Otamo (three-way tied with Elisa Holopainen and Michaela Pejzlová). In a major loss to the team's offensive production, the linemates both signed in the Swiss Women's League (SWHL A) with EV Bomo Thun for the 2022–23 season. Continuing the pattern of signing at least one French national team player to the roster in each season since 2020, TPS inked defenseman Raphaëlle Grenier.

Ilves goaltender Anni Keisala was named 2022 Naisten Liiga Player of the Year and Best Goaltender – in addition to being named Best Goaltender of the 2021 IIHF Women's World Championship – making her a highly sought after addition to a number of international teams. Her decision to sign in the SDHL with HV71 was one of the most significant moves of the pre-season. Ilves recruited internationally to fill Keisala's roster spot and brought in Canadian goaltender Camille Scherger from the UPEI Panthers women's ice hockey program of U Sports. Top defenceman Anna Kilponen, who began the 2021–22 season as captain of Ilves before concluding the season in the ZhHL with the KRS Vanke Rays, opted not to return to Finland and instead signed in the PHF with the Metropolitan Riveters.

Kiekko-Espoo’s Laitinen was not the only Naisten Liiga defenseman to embark on a college ice hockey career in the NCAA Division I, as Krista Parkkonen of HIFK, the 2020 Naisten Liiga Rookie of the Year and a two-time All-Star, joined the Vermont Catamounts women's ice hockey program. HIFK saw relatively little turnover in comparison to their close neighbors in Espoo, with the departure of just Parkkonen and Czech forward Veronika Lorencová, who left for the EVB Eagles Südtirol of the EWHL and Italian Hockey League Women. The team acquired two Finnish national team players: Sanni Vanhanen, the youngest active member of the national team and the top Finnish scorer at the 2022 IIHF U18 Women's World Championship, who had previously played with the Tappara boys' under-17 teams in Finland's top U17 league and had been loaned to Ilves Naiset for a handful of games over the previous several seasons, and Emilia Vesa, a standout winger and former captain of Team Kuortane, who had played with Kiekko-Espoo since 2020.

| Player | Previous team | 2022–23 team | ref. |
Incoming players
| Karolína Erbanová (F) | Almtuna IS (Damettan) | HPK Hämeenlinna | |
| Raphaëlle Grenier (D) | Clermont-Lyon-Roanne U17 (France U17) | TPS Turku | |
| Sydney Harris (D) | Elmira Soaring Eagles (NCAA D3) | RoKi Rovaniemi | |
| Eliška Hotová (D) | HC Příbram (Extraliga) | TPS Turku | |
| Barbora Juříčková (F) | HC Uničov (1. liga žen) | HPK Hämeenlinna | |
| Anna Kalová (F) | HC Litvínov (Extraliga) | RoKi Rovaniemi | |
| Aino Laitinen (G) | Budapest JA (EWHL) | KalPa Kuopio | |
| Margaux Mameri (G) | ACBB-Meudon U17 (France U17) | HPK Hämeenlinna | |
| Camille Scherger (G) | UPEI Panthers (U Sports) | Ilves Tampere | |
| Karolína Skořepová (F) | HC Kobra Prague (1. liga žen) | Kärpät Oulu | |
| Jenna Silvonen (G) | Mercyhurst Lakers (NCAA D1) | Kiekko-Espoo | |
| Sanni Vanhanen (F) | Tappara U16 (Finland U16) | HIFK Helsinki | |
| Ellie Wallace (F) | Queen Bees IHC (WNIHL Elite) | TPS Turku | |
| Lucia Záborská (F) | Hammarby IF (Damettan) | HPK Hämeenlinna | |
Intra-league transfers
| Elisa Holopainen (F) | Kiekko-Espoo | KalPa Kuopio | |
| Sanni Rantala (D) | Kiekko-Espoo | KalPa Kuopio | |
| Emilia Vesa (F) | Kiekko-Espoo | HIFK Helsinki | |
Departing players
| Megan Delay (D) | HPK Hämeenlinna | Buffalo Beauts (PHF) | |
| Estelle Duvin (F) | TPS Tampere | EV Bomo Thun (SWHL A) | |
| Ana Kahlhammer (F) | Lukko Rauma | Maryville University Saints (ACHA) | |
| Aino Karppinen (D) | RoKi Rovaniemi | AIK Hockey (SDHL) | |
| Anni Keisala (G) | Ilves Tampere | HV71 (SDHL) | |
| Anna Kilponen (F) | Ilves Tampere → KRS Vanke Rays (ZhHL) | Metropolitan Riveters (PHF) | |
| Nelli Laitinen (D) | Kiekko-Espoo | Minnesota Golden Gophers (NCAA) | |
| Emmi Leinonen (F) | Kiekko-Espoo | retired | |
| Veera Lindroth (F) | Ilves Tampere | ESC Planegg-Würmtal (DFEL) | |
| Veronika Lorencová (F) | HIFK Helsinki | EVB Eagles Südtirol (EWHL/IHLW) | |
| Matilda Nilsson (F) | HIFK Helsinki | Brynäs IF Dam (SDHL) | |
| Tanja Niskanen (F) | KalPa Kuopio | retired | |
| Riikka Noronen (F) | HPK Hämeenlinna | retired | |
| Maija Otamo (F) | TPS Tampere | EV Bomo Thun (SWHL A) | |
| Krista Parkkonen (D) | HIFK Helsinki | Vermont Catamounts (NCAA) | |
| Noora Räty (G) | HPK Hämeenlinna → KRS Vanke Rays (ZhHL) | unsigned | |
| Kassidy Sauvé (G) | HPK Hämeenlinna | Buffalo Beauts (PHF) | |
| Minttu Tuominen (D) | Kiekko-Espoo → KRS Vanke Rays (ZhHL) | Metropolitan Riveters (PHF) | |
| Ella Viitasuo (D) | Kiekko-Espoo | HV71 (SDHL) | |
| Kiira Yrjänen (F) | Kiekko-Espoo | HV71 (SDHL) | |

== Teams ==
=== 2022–23 season ===
Location of teams in the Naisten Liiga

| Team | Location | Home venue | Head coach | Captain |
|---|---|---|---|---|
| HIFK | Helsinki | Pirkkolan jäähalli | Saara Niemi | Karoliina Rantamäki |
| HPK | Hämeenlinna | Jääliikuntakeskus Hakio | Jari Risku | Heta Seikkula |
| Ilves | Tampere | Tesoman jäähalli | Marjo Voutilainen | Jenna Lehtiniemi |
| KalPa | Kuopio | Niiralan Monttu | Mika Väärälä | Johanna Juutilainen |
| Kiekko-Espoo | Espoo | Tapiolan harjoitusareena | Sami Haapanen | Emmi Rakkolainen |
| Kärpät | Oulu | Raksilan jäähalli | Sanna Lankosaari | Aino Kaijankoski |
| Lukko | Rauma | Westinghouse Areena | Sami Piilikangas | Maija Koski |
| RoKi | Rovaniemi | Lappi Areena | Tuomas Liitola | Eveliina Ollila |
| Team Kuortane | Kuortane | Kuortaneen jäähalli | Mira Kuisma | Nea Tervonen |
| TPS | Turku | Kupittaan jäähalli | Terhi Mertanen | Elina Heikkinen |

Naisten Mestis teams participating in the qualification series

| Team | Location | Home venue | Head coach | Captain |
|---|---|---|---|---|
| HIFK Akatemia | Helsinki | Pirkkolan jäähalli | Antti Borgenström | Anniina Koskinen |
| Kiekko-Espoo Akatemia | Espoo | Matinkylän jäähalli | Casimir Öhman | Linda Österlund |

== Regular season ==
The 180-game regular season began on 10 September 2022 and concluded on 19 February 2023.

=== Standings ===
HIFK Helsinki claimed first place in the regular season for the first time in team history. They tied KalPa Kuopio in points, with 93 points each, but HIFK were awarded top rank by virtue of a higher goal difference. Kiekko-Espoo, the first place team from the 2021–22 regular season, finished in third place with 74 points. HPK Hämeenlinna improved from seventh place (first in the lower division series) in the 2021–22 regular season to fourth in 2022–23, amassing 67 points. Though Tampereen Ilves outperformed their 1.43 points per game (Pts/G) average from 2021–22, with a 1.64 Pts/G, they moved down the rankings from fourth to fifth place, season over season. Team Kuortane finished in sixth place for the second consecutive season, however, like Ilves, they notably improved their points per game from 1.15 to 1.53, season over season. TPS Turku fell from fifth to seventh place and Oulun Kärpät suffered the most dramatic fall in the standings, going from third to eighth place.

| Pos | Team | Pld | W | OTW | OTL | L | GF | GA | GD | Pts | Postseason |
|---|---|---|---|---|---|---|---|---|---|---|---|
| 1 | HIFK | 36 | 29 | 3 | 0 | 4 | 197 | 57 | +140 | 93 | Playoffs |
| 2 | KalPa | 36 | 29 | 2 | 2 | 3 | 197 | 65 | +132 | 93 | Playoffs |
| 3 | Kiekko-Espoo | 36 | 23 | 2 | 1 | 10 | 142 | 70 | +72 | 74 | Playoffs |
| 4 | HPK | 36 | 20 | 3 | 1 | 12 | 116 | 78 | +38 | 67 | Playoffs |
| 5 | Tampereen Ilves | 36 | 16 | 4 | 3 | 13 | 105 | 98 | +7 | 59 | Playoffs |
| 6 | Team Kuortane | 36 | 15 | 3 | 4 | 14 | 91 | 89 | +2 | 55 | Playoffs |
| 7 | TPS | 36 | 14 | 2 | 3 | 17 | 124 | 140 | −16 | 49 | Playoffs |
| 8 | Oulun Kärpät | 36 | 7 | 1 | 5 | 23 | 92 | 150 | −58 | 28 | Playoffs |
| 9 | Rauman Lukko | 36 | 1 | 4 | 1 | 30 | 59 | 227 | −168 | 12 | Qualification |
| 10 | RoKi | 36 | 2 | 0 | 4 | 30 | 44 | 193 | −149 | 10 | Qualification |

Source: Leijonat

=== Schedule ===
Regular Season

September 2022
| Date | Home | Score | Visitor | OT | Attn | Notes | Recap |
|---|---|---|---|---|---|---|---|
| 10 September | TPS | 2–6 | HIFK | | 70 | | |
| 10 September | Ilves | 2–3 | Kuortane | SO | 80 | | |
| 10 September | K-Espoo | 2–3 | KalPa | | 60 | | |
| 10 September | HPK | 4–5 | Kärpät | | 190 | Hat-trick scored by Tilli Keränen (1) | |
| 10 September | Lukko | 3–2 | RoKi | OT | 70 | | |
| 11 September | Kärpät | 0–1 | K-Espoo | | 30 | Shutout recorded by Jenna Silvonen (1) | |
| 11 September | HPK | 4–3 | RoKi | | 80 | | |
| 11 September | KalPa | 7–1 | Lukko | | 60 | | |
| 11 September | Kuortane | 4–3 | TPS | | 90 | | |
| 11 September | HIFK | 5–2 | Ilves | | 70 | | |
| 17 September | HIFK | 3–1 | HPK | | 82 | | |
| 17 September | Lukko | 2–9 | TPS | | 60 | | |
| 17 September | K-Espoo | 6–2 | Ilves | | 72 | Hat-trick scored by Lisette Täks (1) | |
| 17 September | RoKi | 0–4 | Kuortane | | 53 | Shutout recorded by Emilia Kyrkkö (1) | |
| 17 September | KalPa | 9–3 | Kärpät | | 81 | Hat-trick scored by Jenna Hietala (1) | |
| 18 September | TPS | 5–3 | HPK | | 51 | | |
| 18 September | Lukko | 1–11 | HIFK | | 50 | Hat-trick scored by Sanni Vanahanen (1) | |
| 18 September | RoKi | 2–3 | KalPa | OT | 67 | | |
| 18 September | Ilves | 1–4 | K-Espoo | | 110 | | |
| 18 September | Kärpät | 1–3 | Kuortane | | 213 | Highest attended game of month | |
| 24 September | Ilves | 0–3 | HIFK | | 47 | Shutout recorded by Kiia Lahtinen (1) | |
| 24 September | TPS | 4–3 | Kärpät | SO | 40 | | |
| 24 September | HPK | 3–2 | Kuortane | OT | 60 | | |
| 24 September | Lukko | 4–16 | KalPa | | 50 | Hat-trick scored by Jenna Hietala (2; five goals total); Hat-trick scored by Elisa Holopainen (1; four goals total) | |
| 24 September | K-Espoo | 9–2 | RoKi | | 54 | | |
| 25 September | HPK | 1–5 | K-Espoo | | 55 | | |
| 25 September | Lukko | 3–6 | Kärpät | | 50 | Hat-trick scored by Oona Havana (1) | |
| 25 September | HIFK | 7–2 | RoKi | | 84 | | |
| 25 September | Kuortane | 4–1 | Ilves | | 80 | | |
| 25 September | TPS | 2–3 | KalPa | SO | 92 | | |

October 2022
| Date | Home | Score | Visitor | OT | Attn | Notes | Recap |
|---|---|---|---|---|---|---|---|
| 1 October | K-Espoo | 2–1 | HPK | SO | 68 | | |
| 1 October | Kärpät | 1–9 | HIFK | | 105 | Hat-trick scored by Sanni Vanhanen (2) | |
| 1 October | Ilves | 1–7 | KalPa | | 46 | Hat-trick scored by Elisa Holopainen (2; four goals total) | |
| 1 October | RoKi | 3–7 | TPS | | 131 | | |
| 1 October | Kuortane | 7–2 | Lukko | | 50 | | |
| 2 October | KalPa | 4–3 | HIFK | | 181 | Highest attended match of the month | |
| 2 October | RoKi | 0–5 | TPS | | 101 | Shutout recorded by Mila Houni (1) | |
| 2 October | Ilves | 1–0 | HPK | | 56 | Shutout recorded by Juuli Kivimäki (1) | |
| 2 October | Kärpät | 4–5 | Lukko | OT | 93 | | |
| 2 October | K-Espoo | 2–1 | Kuortane | | 61 | | |
| 8 October | Kärpät | 3–4 | Ilves | OT | 84 | | |
| 8 October | TPS | 3–2 | Lukko | | 50 | | |
| 8 October | Kuortane | 1–3 | KalPa | | 80 | | |
| 8 October | HIFK | 5–3 | K-Espoo | | 157 | | |
| 8 October | RoKi | 1–3 | HPK | | 60 | | |
| 9 October | Kärpät | 1–3 | HPK | | 125 | | |
| 9 October | K-Espoo | 6–3 | TPS | | 48 | | |
| 9 October | RoKi | 0–4 | Ilves | | 47 | Shutout recorded by Melisa Mörönen (1) | |
| 9 October | Lukko | 1–11 | KalPa | | 50 | | |
| 9 October | HIFK | 6–0 | Kuortane | | 69 | Shutout recorded by Miia Vainio (1) | |
| 15 October | TPS | 3–2 | Kuortane | | 30 | | |
| 15 October | Ilves | 5–1 | RoKi | | 75 | | |
| 15 October | HPK | 0–2 | KalPa | | 50 | Shutout recorded by Tiina Ranne (1) | |
| 15 October | K-Espoo | 7–0 | Lukko | | 26 | Shutout recorded by Tiia Pajarinen (1) | |
| 15 October | HIFK | 6–0 | Kärpät | | 49 | Shutout recorded by Lumi Jääskeläinen (1) | |
| 16 October | KalPa | 6–1 | Ilves | | 126 | Hat-trick recorded by Elisa Holopainen (3) | |
| 16 October | HPK | 2–0 | TPS | | 70 | Shutout recorded by Noora Räty (1) | |
| 16 October | Lukko | 1–6 | HIFK | | 50 | | |
| 16 October | Kuortane | 4–0 | RoKi | | 70 | Shutout recorded by Lilia Huovinen (1) | |
| 16 October | K-Espoo | 3–0 | Kärpät | | 54 | Shutout recorded by Minja Drufva (1) | |
| 22 October | Kärpät | 2–3 | TPS | | 86 | | |
| 22 October | Ilves | 3–0 | Kuortane | | 55 | Shutout recorded by Melisa Mörönen (2) | |
| 22 October | KalPa | 15–2 | Lukko | | 168 | Hat-trick recorded by Jenna Kaila (1); Hat-trick recorded by Liisa Kastikainen (1); Hat-trick recorded by Kaisla Kortelainen (1; four goals total) | |
| 22 October | HPK | 5–4 | HIFK | | 60 | | |
| 22 October | RoKi | 0–4 | K-Espoo | | 50 | Shutout recorded by Tiia Pajarinen (2) | |
| 23 October | Kärpät | 6–1 | Lukko | | 115 | | |
| 23 October | RoKi | 0–5 | K-Espoo | | 56 | Shutout recorded by Minja Drufva (2) | |
| 23 October | KalPa | 6–1 | TPS | | 118 | | |
| 23 October | HPK | 3–1 | Kuortane | | 60 | | |
| 23 October | HIFK | 10–1 | Ilves | | 85 | Hat-trick recorded by Julia Liikala (1); Hat-trick recorded by Emilia Vesa (1; four goals total) | |
| 26 October | Kärpät | 3–4 | Kuortane | SO | 93 | | |
| 29 October | KalPa | 5–2 | HPK | | 82 | | |
| 29 October | TPS | 4–5 | K-Espoo | | 40 | | |
| 29 October | RoKi | 2–6 | HIFK | | 105 | Hat-trick recorded by Julia Liikala (2) | |
| 29 October | Kuortane | 3–1 | Kärpät | | 50 | | |
| 29 October | Ilves | 9–0 | Lukko | | 62 | Shutout recorded by Juuli Kivimäki (2) | |
| 30 October | RoKi | 0–12 | HIFK | | 47 | Hat-trick recorded by Johanna Kemppainen (1; 4 goals total); Hat-trick recorded by Julia Liikala (3) | |
| 30 October | Lukko | 2–8 | TPS | | 50 | Hat-trick recorded by Pauliina Salonen (1) | |
| 30 October | Kuortane | 6–3 | HPK | | 70 | | |
| 30 October | Kärpät | 2–9 | KalPa | | 128 | Hat-trick recorded by Elisa Holopainen (4) | |
| 30 October | K-Espoo | 2–1 | Ilves | OT | 52 | | |

November 2022
| Date | Home | Score | Visitor | OT | Attn | Notes | Recap |
|---|---|---|---|---|---|---|---|
| 5 November | Ilves | 4–0 | Kärpät | | 85 | Shutout recorded by Melisa Mörönen (3) | |
| 5 November | Lukko | 1–5 | Kuortane | | 75 | | |
| 5 November | HIFK | 5–2 | HPK | | 65 | | |
| 5 November | TPS | 6–3 | RoKi | | 35 | | |
| 5 November | KalPa | 3–2 | K-Espoo | | 63 | | |
| 6 November | Kuortane | 2–1 | K-Espoo | | 40 | | |
| 6 November | HPK | 6–0 | RoKi | | 50 | No shutout recorded (goaltender change) | |
| 6 November | Lukko | 2–5 | Ilves | | 50 | | |
| 6 November | HIFK | 7–1 | TPS | | 78 | | |
| 6 November | KalPa | 7–2 | Kärpät | | 100 | | |
| 16 November | HPK | 1–2 | Ilves | | 40 | | |
| 16 November | K-Espoo | 1–3 | HIFK | | 73 | | |
| 19 November | HIFK | 6–2 | Lukko | | 60 | | |
| 19 November | Kuortane | 1–0 | Kärpät | | 30 | Shutout recorded by Venla Varis (1) | |
| 19 November | TPS | 1–9 | HPK | | 54 | | |
| 19 November | RoKi | 0–7 | KalPa | | 31 | Shutout recorded by Tiina Ranne (2) | |
| 20 November | Lukko | 3–2 | Ilves | OT | 40 | | |
| 20 November | RoKi | 1–4 | Kuortane | | 31 | | |
| 20 November | TPS | 8–5 | K-Espoo | | 25 | Hat-trick recorded by Ines Lukkarila (1); Hat-trick recorded by Pauliina Salonen (2) | |
| 20 November | Kärpät | 3–5 | KalPa | | 107 | Highest attended match of the month | |
| 26 November | HIFK | 8–0 | RoKi | | 55 | Shutout recorded by Lumi Jääskeläinen (2) | |
| 26 November | TPS | 2–1 | Kuortane | SO | 35 | | |
| 26 November | Ilves | 0–4 | KalPa | | 60 | Hat-trick recorded by Jenna Juutilainen (1); Shutout recorded by Tiina Ranne (3) | |
| 26 November | HPK | 6–1 | Lukko | | 30 | | |
| 26 November | K-Espoo | 3–1 | Kärpät | | 59 | | |
| 27 November | K-Espoo | 7–1 | RoKi | | 52 | | |
| 27 November | Lukko | 1–2 | HPK | OT | 40 | | |
| 27 November | TPS | 2–6 | Ilves | | 40 | | |
| 27 November | HIFK | 4–1 | Kärpät | | 70 | | |
| 27 November | Kuortane | 1–7 | KalPa | | 40 | Hat-trick recorded by Jenna Kaila (2); Hat-trick recorded by Elisa Holopainen (5) | |

December 2022
| Date | Home | Score | Visitor | OT | Attn | Notes | Recap |
|---|---|---|---|---|---|---|---|
| 3 December | Kärpät | 2–4 | Ilves | | 68 | | |
| 3 December | TPS | 4–1 | Lukko | | 34 | Hat-trick recorded by Susanna Viitala (1) | |
| 3 December | RoKi | 1–8 | HPK | | 35 | Hat-trick recorded by Kiti Seikkula (1) | |
| 3 December | K-Espoo | 5–1 | Kuortane | | 45 | | |
| 3 December | HIFK | 2–3 | KalPa | | 98 | | |
| 4 December | Kärpät | 3–4 | HPK | | 77 | | |
| 4 December | Lukko | 1–8 | K-Espoo | | 40 | | |
| 4 December | TPS | 2–10 | KalPa | | 47 | | |
| 4 December | RoKi | 1–5 | Ilves | | 37 | | |
| 4 December | HIFK | 2–1 | Kuortane | OT | 74 | | |
| 6 December | KalPa | 4–0 | Kuortane | | 112 | Shutout recorded by Aino Laitinen (1); Highest attended match of the month | |
| 6 December | RoKi | 3–2 | Kärpät | | 25 | | |
| 6 December | HPK | 4–2 | TPS | | 40 | | |
| 7 December | K-Espoo | 6–0 | HIFK | | 74 | Shutout recorded by Tiia Pajarinen (3) | |
| 7 December | Ilves | 4–0 | Lukko | | 70 | Shutout recorded by Juuli Kivimäki (3) | |
| 10 December | Kärpät | 6–5 | TPS | | 91 | | |
| 10 December | Ilves | 2–4 | HIFK | | 42 | | |
| 10 December | HPK | 4–3 | KalPa | SO | 50 | HPK snapped KalPa's 26-game win-streak in the shootout | |
| 10 December | Kuortane | 3–0 | RoKi | | 40 | Shutout recorded by Emilia Kyrkkö (2) | |
| 10 December | K-Espoo | 7–0 | Lukko | | 52 | Shutout recorded by Minja Drufva (3) | |
| 11 December | Ilves | 5–2 | RoKi | | 45 | | |
| 11 December | KalPa | 6–3 | TPS | | 66 | | |
| 11 December | HPK | 5–1 | K-Espoo | | 50 | | |
| 11 December | HIFK | 7–0 | Lukko | | 50 | Shutout recorded by Lumi Jääskeläinen (3) | |

January 2023
| Date | Home | Score | Visitor | OT | Attn | Notes | Recap |
|---|---|---|---|---|---|---|---|
| 21 January | KalPa | 2–1 | K-Espoo | | 121 | | |
| 21 January | Ilves | 5–4 | TPS | OT | 65 | | |
| 21 January | Kuortane | 1–2 | HPK | | 50 | | |
| 21 January | Kärpät | 1–10 | HIFK | | 260 | Highest attended match of the season (tied with Kärpät @ TPS, 19 February) | |
| 21 January | RoKi | 2–3 | Lukko | | 40 | | |
| 22 January | RoKi | 2–3 | Lukko | SO | 53 | | |
| 22 January | Kärpät | 1–5 | K-Espoo | | 93 | | |
| 22 January | KalPa | 1–3 | HPK | | 82 | League point leader Elisa Holopainen suffered a season-ending leg injury after taking a fall mid-game. | |
| 22 January | TPS | 5–2 | Ilves | | | | |
| 22 January | Kuortane | 0–6 | HIFK | | 60 | Shutout recorded by Kiia Lahtinen (2) | |
| 28 January | TPS | 1–5 | HIFK | | 75 | | |
| 28 January | KalPa | 5–0 | RoKi | | 72 | Shutout recorded by Jenna Juutilainen (2) | |
| 28 January | Kuortane | 2–3 | K-Espoo | | 50 | | |
| 28 January | HPK | 4–0 | Ilves | | 70 | Shutout recorded by Noora Räty (2) | |
| 28 January | Lukko | 3–4 | Kärpät | | 40 | | |
| 29 January | KalPa | 8–1 | RoKi | | 78 | Hat-trick recorded by Jenna Hietala (3) | |
| 29 January | HPK | 0–5 | HIFK | | 70 | Shutout recorded by Iina Kuusela (1) | |
| 29 January | Lukko | 3–8 | K-Espoo | | 50 | | |
| 29 January | Ilves | 4–3 | Kärpät | OT | 75 | | |
| 29 January | Kuortane | 3–2 | TPS | OT | 70 | | |

February 2023
| Date | Home | Score | Visitor | OT | Attn | Notes | Recap |
|---|---|---|---|---|---|---|---|
| 4 February | Kuortane | 5–0 | Lukko | | 60 | Shutout recorded by Emilia Kyrkkö (3); Hat-trick recorded by Sofia Kari (1) | |
| 4 February | Ilves | 2–1 | HPK | | 62 | | |
| 4 February | HIFK | 6–5 | KalPa | OT | 96 | Hat-trick recorded by Jenna Kaila (3) | |
| 4 February | K-Espoo | 6–0 | TPS | | 72 | Shutout recorded by Tiia Pajarinen (4); Hat-trick recorded by Anni-Elina Montonen (1) | |
| 4 February | Kärpät | 6–2 | RoKi | | 121 | Hat-trick recorded by Tilli Keränen (2) | |
| 5 February | Lukko | 0–7 | HPK | | 45 | Shutout recorded by Salla Sivula (1) | |
| 5 February | Kuortane | 2–3 | Ilves | OT | 80 | | |
| 5 February | K-Espoo | 3–0 | KalPa | | 88 | Shutout recorded by Tiia Pajarinen (5) | |
| 5 February | RoKi | 2–3 | Kärpät | OT | 33 | | |
| 5 February | HIFK | 5–1 | TPS | | 89 | | |
| 18 February | KalPa | 0–3 | HIFK | | 158 | Shutout recorded by Kiia Lahtinen (3) | |
| 18 February | Ilves | 7–1 | K-Espoo | | 35 | Hat-trick recorded by Anniina Kaitala (1) | |
| 18 February | Lukko | 2–8 | Kuortane | | 45 | | |
| 18 February | HPK | 3–2 | Kärpät | | 70 | | |
| 18 February | TPS | 7–0 | RoKi | | 83 | Shutout recorded by Tea Koljonen (1) | |
| 19 February | Lukko | 2–3 | RoKi | | 50 | | |
| 19 February | TPS | 5–1 | Kärpät | | 260 | Highest attended match of the season (tied with HIFK @ Kärpät, 21 January) | |
| 19 February | K-Espoo | 0–2 | HPK | | 64 | Shutout recorded by Salla Sivula (2) | |
| 19 February | KalPa | 2–1 | Ilves | | 60 | | |
| 19 February | Kuortane | 2–3 | HIFK | | 50 | | |

=== Player statistics ===
==== Scoring leaders ====
The following players led the league in points at the conclusion of the regular season on 19 February 2023.

| Player | Team | GP | G | A | Pts | PIM |
|---|---|---|---|---|---|---|
| Michaela Pejzlová | HIFK | 31 | 32 | 50 | 82 | 2 |
| Elisa Holopainen | KalPa | 28 | 41 | 34 | 75 | 4 |
| Julia Liikala | HIFK | 30 | 28 | 38 | 66 | 10 |
| Jenna Kaila | KalPa | 36 | 28 | 31 | 59 | 14 |
| Emilia Vesa | HIFK | 28 | 22 | 31 | 53 | 18 |
| Jenna Hietala | KalPa | 35 | 29 | 21 | 50 | 6 |
| Johanna Juutilainen | KalPa | 36 | 14 | 36 | 50 | 8 |
| Clara Rozier | HIFK | 34 | 24 | 25 | 49 | 22 |
| Júlia Matejková | HPK | 34 | 15 | 28 | 43 | 20 |
| Anni-Elina Montonen | K-Espoo | 34 | 21 | 21 | 42 | 6 |
| Siiri Yrjölä | HIFK | 31 | 16 | 26 | 42 | 20 |
| Pauliina Salonen | TPS | 36 | 23 | 17 | 40 | 36 |
| Sanni Vanhanen | HIFK | 22 | 18 | 22 | 40 | 2 |
| Tereza Pištěková | TPS | 34 | 14 | 26 | 40 | 8 |
| Sofia Nuutinen | K-Espoo | 34 | 14 | 25 | 39 | 16 |
| Sanni Rantala | KalPa | 30 | 7 | 32 | 39 | 6 |
| Emmi Rakkolainen | K-Espoo | 29 | 13 | 25 | 38 | 10 |
| Oona Havana | Kärpät | 36 | 23 | 13 | 36 | 24 |
| Emilia Varpula | Ilves | 34 | 11 | 25 | 36 | 4 |
| Johanna Kemppainen | HIFK | 36 | 16 | 19 | 35 | 10 |
| Kiti Seikkula | HPK | 32 | 18 | 16 | 34 | 10 |

The following skaters were the top point scorers of teams not represented in the scoring leader table at the conclusion of the regular season on 19 February 2023, noted with their overall league scoring rank:

- 25. Nea Tervonen (F), Kuortane: 33 GP, 12 G, 20 A, 32 Pts, 4 PIM
- 39. Aliisa Toivonen (F), Lukko: 33 GP, 12 G, 12 A, 24 Pts, 28 PIM
- 63. Iida Lappalainen (F), RoKi: 33 GP, 11 G, 6 A, 17 Pts, 26 PIM

==== Goaltenders ====
The following goaltenders had played at least one-third of their team's minutes in net at the conclusion of the regular season on 19 February 2023, sorted by save percentage.

| Player | Team | GP | TOI | W | L | S | GA | SO | S-% | GAA |
|---|---|---|---|---|---|---|---|---|---|---|
| Tiina Ranne | KalPa | 20 | 1186:55 | 16 | 2 | 501 | 33 | 3 | 93.8 | 1.67 |
| Kiia Lahtinen | HIFK | 18 | 1080:31 | 17 | 1 | 349 | 24 | 4 | 93.6 | 1.33 |
| Salla Sivula | HPK | 26 | 1482:59 | 15 | 8 | 611 | 49 | 2 | 92.6 | 1.98 |
| Emilia Kyrkkö | Kuortane | 24 | 1430:18 | 9 | 12 | 692 | 56 | 3 | 92.5 | 2.35 |
| Tiia Pajarinen | K-Espoo | 21 | 1229:49 | 13 | 6 | 389 | 34 | 5 | 92.1 | 1.66 |
| Juuli Kivimäki | Ilves | 15 | 837:31 | 7 | 5 | 384 | 33 | 3 | 92.1 | 2.36 |
| Melisa Mörönen | Ilves | 19 | 947:58 | 10 | 9 | 415 | 44 | 3 | 90.4 | 2.78 |
| Kati Asikainen | Kärpät | 29 | 1740:11 | 6 | 21 | 892 | 106 | 0 | 89.4 | 3.65 |
| Sari Saarinen | TPS | 13 | 778:32 | 4 | 7 | 374 | 46 | 0 | 89.0 | 3.55 |
| Janika Järvikari | RoKi | 21 | 1121:41 | 1 | 18 | 740 | 95 | 0 | 88.6 | 5.08 |
| Minja Drufva | K-Espoo | 13 | 750:57 | 8 | 5 | 224 | 30 | 3 | 88.2 | 2.40 |
| Olivia Last | RoKi | 19 | 1037:02 | 1 | 15 | 701 | 95 | 0 | 88.1 | 5.50 |
| Tea Koljonen | TPS | 15 | 786:10 | 7 | 3 | 308 | 44 | 1 | 87.5 | 3.36 |
| Katriina Saarenmaa | Lukko | 16 | 906:25 | 2 | 12 | 501 | 87 | 0 | 85.2 | 5.76 |
| Johanna Niemi | Lukko | 15 | 805:46 | 2 | 11 | 447 | 80 | 0 | 84.8 | 5.96 |

Top backup goaltenders

The following goaltenders recorded the highest save percentages of those who had played a minimum of ten percent but fewer than one-third of their team’s minutes in net at the conclusion of the regular season on 19 February 2023.

| Player | Team | GP | TOI | W | L | S | GA | SO | S-% | GAA |
|---|---|---|---|---|---|---|---|---|---|---|
| Noora Räty | HPK | 9 | 499:01 | 5 | 3 | 217 | 13 | 2 | 94.3 | 1.56 |
| Miia Vainio | HIFK | 6 | 360:00 | 5 | 1 | 121 | 11 | 1 | 91.7 | 1.83 |
| Jenna Juutilainen | KalPa | 10 | 563:48 | 9 | 0 | 142 | 14 | 2 | 91.0 | 1.49 |
| Aino Laitinen | KalPa | 7 | 421:41 | 5 | 2 | 156 | 17 | 1 | 90.2 | 2.42 |
| Lumi Jääskeläinen | HIFK | 9 | 541:22 | 7 | 2 | 146 | 16 | 3 | 90.1 | 1.77 |
| Venla Varis | Kuortane | 10 | 570:47 | 5 | 4 | 228 | 25 | 1 | 90.1 | 2.63 |

=== Player movements ===
| Player | Previous team | Active team | Date |
Incoming players
| Noora Räty (G) | KRS Vanke Rays | HPK Hämeenlinna | 30 September 2022 |
| Anna Zíková (D) | Göteborg HC (SDHL) | HPK Hämeenlinna | 26 January 2023 |
| Sarah Knee (D) | no team | KalPa Kuopio | 15 February 2023 |
| Esther Väärälä (F) | no team | KalPa Kuopio | 16 February 2023 |
Departing players
| Camille Scherger (G) | Ilves Tampere | Skellefteå AIK (Damettan) | 11 September 2022 |
| Margaux Mameri (G) | HPK Hämeenlinna | Jets d’Evry-Viry (FFHG Division 2) | 11 November 2022 |
| Tuva Schall Mikkelsen (D) | Ilves Tampere | Hasle-Løren (NIHF Kvinner Elite) | 5 December 2022 |

==== Loans ====
| Player | Signed team | Loaned team | Notes |
|---|---|---|---|
| Alexandra Väyrynen (G) | Kiekko-Espoo | RoKi Rovaniemi | 2-game loan, 10–11 September 2022 |
| Heta Paasilinna (D) | Kiekko-Espoo | RoKi Rovaniemi | 1-game loan, 25 September 2022 |
| Rosa-Marie Ojala (G) | APV | Team Kuortane | 2-game loan, began 4 February 2023 |

== Playoffs ==
HIFK swept all three rounds of the 2023 Aurora Borealis Cup playoffs to win the Aurora Borealis Cup for the first time in team history. Kiekko-Espoo, the reigning Finnish Champions from the 2022 Aurora Borealis Cup playoffs, claimed the franchise's third Finnish Championship silver medal and KalPa won Finnish Championship bronze for the fourth time.

Quarterfinals
1 | IFK Helsinki | 12 | 8 | 6 | / | 3
8 | Kärpät Oulu | 0 | 0 | 0 | / | 0
4 | HPK Hämeenlinna | 5 | 1 | 5 | 4 | 3
5 | Ilves Tampere | 0 | 5 | 3 | 2 | 1
2 | KalPa Kuopio | 4 | 5 | 4 | / | 3
7 | TPS Turku | 1 | 4 | 3 | / | 0
3 | Kiekko-Espoo | 3 | 2 | 4 | 3 | 3
6 | Team Kuortane | 4 | 1 | 3 | 0 | 1

Semifinals
1 | IFK Helsinki | 2 | 6 | 6 | / | 3
4 | HPK Hämeenlinna | 0 | 1 | 2 | / | 0
2 | KalPa Kuopio | 2 | 3 | 1 | 0 | 1
3 | Kiekko-Espoo | 3 | 2 | 2 | 2 | 3

Finals
1st place, gold medalist(s) | IFK Helsinki | 9 | 4 | 3 | 3
2nd place, silver medalist(s) | Kiekko-Espoo | 2 | 0 | 2 | 0
Bronze medal game
3rd place, bronze medalist(s) | KalPa Kuopio | 3
4 | HPK Hämeenlinna | 1

Source: Suomen Jääkiekkoliitto

== Qualification ==
The qualification series (Finnish: karsintasarja) began on 18 March and concluded on 2 April 2023. It was played as a double round-robin in which each team will face every opponent once at home and once away.

Two teams from the 2022 qualification series returned to the promotion/relegation tournament in 2023: Lukko and RoKi. In the 2022 series, RoKi successfully defended their place in the league and, after having been relegated to the Naisten Mestis in the 2021 Naisten Liiga qualification, Lukko earned promotion back to the Naisten Liiga via the relegation of Vaasan Sport Naiset.

Lukko and RoKi were joined by the top two teams of the Naisten Mestis regular season, HIFK Akatemia and Kiekko-Espoo Akatemia, the respective developmental squad of HIFK Naiset and Kiekko-Espoo Naiset, the Aurora Borealis Cup finalists. Both teams made their debut in the Naisten Liiga qualification and the series was the first in league history to feature the developmental squads of two teams active in the Naisten Liiga.

The series concluded with RoKi and Lukko overcoming HIFK Akatemia and Kiekko-Espoo Akatemia to save themselves from relegation. Both teams will remain in the Naisten Liiga for the 2023–24 season, while HIFK Akatemia and Kiekko-Espoo Akatemia will play in the season in the Naisten Mestis.

=== Standings ===
| Pos | Team | Pld | W | OTW | OTL | L | GF | GA | GD | Pts | 2022–23 season |
|---|---|---|---|---|---|---|---|---|---|---|---|
| 1 | RoKi | 6 | 4 | 0 | 1 | 1 | 18 | 12 | +6 | 13 | Naisten Liiga |
| 2 | Lukko | 6 | 3 | 0 | 1 | 2 | 22 | 14 | +8 | 10 | Naisten Liiga |
| 3 | HIFK Ak | 6 | 2 | 1 | 0 | 3 | 16 | 14 | +2 | 8 | Naisten Mestis |
| 4 | K-Espoo Ak | 6 | 1 | 1 | 0 | 4 | 8 | 24 | −16 | 5 | Naisten Mestis |

Source: Suomen Jääkiekkoliitto

=== Results ===
| 18 March 2023; 11:00 | Lukko Rauma | 9 – 0 (0–0, 3–0, 6–0) | Kiekko-Espoo Ak | Eurajoen jäähalli, Eurajoki; Attendance: 30 |

Saara Rintamaa
Goalies
Lilli Packalen
Referee:
Juho Suominen
Linesmen:
Jaakko Myllyniemi
Teemu Kantola

| Toivonen (Laine) – 26:35 | 1–0 |
| Hyytiä (Koski, Ukkola) – 30:09 | 2–0 |
| Karru – 31:18 | 3–0 |
| Laine (P. Koskinen) – 49:32 | 4–0 |
| Kangasniemi (Koski, Ukkola) – 49:46 | 5–0 |
| Toivonen (Laine) – 50:25 | 6–0 |
| Koski (Kangasniemi, Laaksonen) – 52:13 | 7–0 |
| Koski – 55:37 | 8–0 |
| Julkunen (Ukkola) – 58:09 | 9–0 |

6 min
Penalties
4 min
48
Shots
16

| 18 March 2023; 12:00 | RoKi Rovaniemi | 3 – 2 (0–0, 0–0, 3–2) | HIFK Helsinki Ak | Lappi Areena, Rovaniemi; Attendance: 44 |

Janika Järvikari
Goalies
Miia Vainio
Referee:
Eemi Kaarlela
Linesmen:
Atte Mathlin
Lauri Alamartin

| Heikonen (Kalová, Jatkola) (PP) – 48:14 | 1–0 |
| | 1–1 | 49:36 – Holmberg (Malinen, E. Andersson) |
| I. Lappalainen (Kalová, Heikonen) (PP) – 53:11 | 2–1 |
| | 2–2 | 56:38 – Hintikka (Ne. Karlberg, M. Järvinen) |
| Felcmanová – 58:38 | 3–2 |

8 min
Penalties
4 min
34
Shots
32

| 19 March 2023; 14:30 | RoKi Rovaniemi | 4 – 2 (1–1, 2–1, 1–0) | Lukko Rauma | Lappi Areena, Rovaniemi; Attendance: 60 |

Janika Järvikari
Goalies
Saara Rintamaa
Referee:
Tomi Pirttijärvi
Linesmen:
Atte Mathlin
Lauri Alamartin

| | 0–1 | 11:33 – Toivonen (PP) |
| Lepola (Iso-Kouvola, Lassila) (PP) – 16:42 | 1–1 |
| | 1–2 | 29:24 – Se. Siivonen (R. Lehikoinen) |
| Felcmanová (Heinonen) – 36:17 | 2–2 |
| I. Lappalainen (Felcmanová, Kalová) – 39:18 | 3–2 |
| Lepola (Iso-Kouvola, Heinonen) (PP) – 52:04 | 4–2 |

4 min
Penalties
4 min
18
Shots
38

| 19 March 2023; 17:30 | HIFK Helsinki Ak | 0 – 3 (0–1, 0–1, 0–1) | Kiekko-Espoo Ak | Pirkkolan jäähalli, Helsinki; Attendance: 65 |

Miia Vainio
Goalies
Alexandra Väyrynen
Referee:
Akos Berger
Linesmen:
Ilona Silander
Johanna Oksanen

| 0–1 | 06:24 – Grönlund (Eli. Kemppainen, Saarni) |
| 0–2 | 27:00 – Matomäki (Österlund, Leino) |
| 0–3 | 56:46 – Grönlund (Matomäki) (EN) |

12 min
Penalties
4 min
23
Shots
18

| 24 March 2023; 19:20 | Kiekko-Espoo Ak | 0 – 6 (0–1, 0–4, 0–1) | HIFK Helsinki Ak | Matinkylä I, Espoo; Attendance: 50 |

Lilli Packalen
Alexandra Väyrynen
Goalies
Miia Vainio
Referee:
Akos Berger
Linesmen:
Salla-Maaria Raitala
Johanna Oksanen

| 0–1 | 09:09 – Holmberg (N. Andersson, A. Lehikoinen) (PP) |
| 0–2 | 34:50 – Kuuluvainen (Huttunen, A. Koskinen) (PP) |
| 0–3 | 36:12 – Malinen (Holmberg, N. Andersson) (PP) |
| 0–4 | 39:10 – Holmberg (Hintikka) |
| 0–5 | 39:58 – Malinen (A. Lehikoinen) |
| 0–6 | 50:26 – N. Andersson (Loikkanen, Turunen) |

14 min
Penalties
8 min
24
Shots
47

| 25 March 2023; 14:50 | HIFK Helsinki Ak | 5 – 4 (2–0, 2–3, 1–1) | Lukko Rauma | Töölö 2, Helsinki; Attendance: 15 |

Miia Vainio
Goalies
Saara Rintamaa
Referee:
Henna Åberg
Linesmen:
Ilona Silander
Johanna Oksanen

| N. Andersson (Järvinen) – 10:55 | 1–0 |
| Turunen (Ne. Karlberg, A. Koskinen) – 12:41 | 2–0 |
| | 2–1 | 29:36 – Julkunen (Laine) |
| | 2–2 | 35:05 – Koski |
| | 2–3 | 35:19 – Koski (Se. Siivonen, Hyytiä) |
| Turunen (A. Koskinen) – 36:08 | 3–3 |
| A. Lehikoinen – 38:54 | 4–3 |
| Holmberg (Turunen) – 50:39 | 5–3 |
| | 5–4 | 59:05 – Toivonen (P. Koskinen, Koski) |

4 min
Penalties
6 min
12
Shots
43

| 25 March 2023; 18:50 | Kiekko-Espoo Ak | 0 – 3 (0–0, 0–1, 0–2) | RoKi Rovaniemi | Leppävaara D, Espoo; Attendance: 45 |

Lilli Packalen
Goalies
Janika Järvikari
Referee:
Akos Berger
Linesmen:
Tomas Ramu
Rasmus Hellman

| 0–1 | 31:12 – Kalová (Felcmanová) |
| 0–2 | 42:49 – I. Lappalainen (Kalová, Felcmanová) |
| 0–3 | 58:36 – Kalová (EN) |

8 min
Penalties
8 min
23
Shots
29

| 26 March 2023; 14:15 | Lukko Rauma | 3 – 2 (0–1, 1–0, 2–1) | RoKi Rovaniemi | Eurajoen jäähalli, Eurajoki; Attendance: 50 |

Katriina Saarenmaa
Goalies
Janika Järvikari
Referee:
Niko Rautavuori
Linesmen:
Lassi Koivunen
Jussi Hirsimäki

| | 0–1 | 05:01 – Felcmanová (Kalová) |
| Lundström (Grönroos, Toivonen) (PP) – 28:38 | 1–1 |
| | 1–2 | 45:07 – Lassila (Sa. Siivonen, Iso-Kouvola) (PP) |
| Karru (Toivonen, Se. Siivonen) (PP) – 48:09 | 2–2 |
| Toivonen (Lundström) – 54:07 | 3–2 |

6 min
Penalties
12 min
26
Shots
14

| 1 April 2023; 12:00 | RoKi Rovaniemi | 3 – 4 OT (1–1, 1–2, 1–0) (OT: 0–1) | Kiekko-Espoo Ak | Lappi Areena, Rovaniemi; Attendance: 53 |

Janika Järvikari
Goalies
Alexandra Väyrynen
Referee:
Elias Klytseroff
Linesmen:
Pete Saarinen
Tommi Rissanen

| | 0–1 | 02:41 – Grönlund (Ell. Kemppainen) |
| I. Lappalainen (Kalová) – 04:02 | 1–1 |
| I. Lappalainen (Kalová) – 24:40 | 2–1 |
| | 2–2 | 29:24 – Grönlund (Ell. Kemppainen, Helin) |
| | 2–3 | 33:25 – Österlund (K. Eronen) |
| Iso-Kouvola (Jatkola) – 40:36 | 3–3 |
| | 3–4 | 60:08 – Grönlund (Ell. Kemppainen) |

10 min
Penalties
4 min
20
Shots
46

| 1 April 2023; 16:00 | Lukko Rauma | 1 – 2 GWS (0–0, 0–0, 1–1) (OT: 0–0) (SO: 0–1) | HIFK Helsinki Ak | Eurajoen jäähalli, Eurajoki; Attendance: 60 |

| Katriina Saarenmaa | Goalies | Miia Vainio | Referee: Toni Lehtinen; Linesmen: Jaakko Myllyniemi; Teemu Kantola |
| P. Koskinen (Se. Siivonen) – 50:13 / 1–0; / 1–1 / 54:18 – Loikkanen (Hintikka, Päkkilä) | | | Referee: Toni Lehtinen; Linesmen: Jaakko Myllyniemi; Teemu Kantola |
| Karru (miss); P. Koskinen (miss); Hyttiä (miss); Toivonen (miss) | Shootout | Päkkilä; Malinen; (miss) Ne. Karlberg | Referee: Toni Lehtinen; Linesmen: Jaakko Myllyniemi; Teemu Kantola |
| 2 min | Penalties | 6 min | Referee: Toni Lehtinen; Linesmen: Jaakko Myllyniemi; Teemu Kantola |
| 38 | Shots | 21 | Referee: Toni Lehtinen; Linesmen: Jaakko Myllyniemi; Teemu Kantola |

| 2 April 2023; 15:00 | HIFK Helsinki Ak | 1 – 3 (1–2, 0–0, 0–1) | RoKi Rovaniemi | Pirkkola 2, Helsinki; Attendance: 48 |

Miia Vainio
Goalies
Janika Järvikari
Referee:
Akos Berger
Linesmen:
Rasmus Hellman
Ilona Silander

| | 0–1 | 01:02 – Iso-Kouvola (E. Lappalainen, Heinonen) |
| | 0–2 | 06:52 – I. Lappalainen (Felcmanová) |
| Hintikka (Ne. Karlberg) (PP) – 14:35 | 1–2 |
| | 1–3 | 55:26 – Kalová (Felcmanová) |

12 min
Penalties
14 min
24
Shots
23

| 2 April 2023; 16:50 | Kiekko-Espoo Ak | 1 – 3 (1–0, 0–1, 0–2) | Lukko Rauma | Leppävaara D, Espoo; Attendance: 38 |

Lilli Packalen
Goalies
Katriina Saarenmaa
Referee:
Petri Uotila
Linesmen:
Tapio Heikkola
Leo Oksman

| Eli. Kemppainen (Sa. Yrjölä, Österlund) (PP) – 08:20 | 1–0 |
| | 1–1 | 33:29 – Toivonen (Lundström) (SH) |
| | 1–2 | 51:08 – Toivonen (Lundström) |
| | 1–3 | 56:53 – Toivonen (Lundström) |

8 min
Penalties
8 min
17
Shots
37

=== Player statistics ===
Scoring leaders

The following players were the qualification point leaders at the conclusion of the series on 2 April 2023.

| Player | Team | GP | G | A | Pts | PIM |
|---|---|---|---|---|---|---|
| Aliisa Toivonen | Lukko | 6 | 8 | 2 | 10 | 0 |
| Anna Kalová | RoKi | 6 | 3 | 7 | 10 | 2 |
| Magdaléna Felcmanová | RoKi | 6 | 3 | 5 | 8 | 4 |
| Maija Koski | Lukko | 4 | 4 | 3 | 7 | 0 |
| Iida Lappalainen | RoKi | 6 | 6 | 0 | 6 | 6 |
| Erica Grönlund | K-Espoo Ak | 6 | 5 | 0 | 5 | 4 |
| Heidi Holmberg | HIFK Ak | 6 | 4 | 1 | 5 | 4 |
| Viivi Iso-Kouvola | RoKi | 6 | 2 | 3 | 5 | 4 |
| Charlotta Lundström | Lukko | 6 | 1 | 4 | 5 | 4 |
| Nelly Andersson | HIFK Ak | 5 | 2 | 2 | 4 | 2 |

Goaltenders

The following goaltenders had played a minimum of one qualification game at the conclusion of the series on 2 April 2023, sorted by save percentage.

| Player | Team | GP | TOI | W | L | S | GA | SO | S-% | GAA |
|---|---|---|---|---|---|---|---|---|---|---|
| Alexandra Väyrynen | K-Espoo Ak | 3 | 140:08 | 2 | 0 | 80 | 4 | 1 | 95.2 | 1.71 |
| Miia Vainio | HIFK Ak | 6 | 361:48 | 2 | 3 | 166 | 13 | 1 | 92.7 | 2.16 |
| Janika Järvikari | RoKi | 6 | 360:08 | 4 | 2 | 151 | 12 | 1 | 92.6 | 2.00 |
| Katriina Saarenmaa | Lukko | 3 | 185:00 | 2 | 0 | 47 | 4 | 0 | 92.2 | 1.30 |
| Lilli Packalen | K-Espoo Ak | 4 | 217:06 | 0 | 4 | 125 | 19 | 0 | 86.8 | 5.25 |
| Saara Rintamaa | Lukko | 3 | 177:27 | 1 | 2 | 37 | 9 | 1 | 80.4 | 3.04 |

== Awards and honours ==
- Kultainen Kypärä ('Golden Helmet'): Elisa Holopainen, KalPa

=== Finnish Ice Hockey Association awards ===
- Riikka Nieminen Award (Player of the Year): Elisa Holopainen, KalPa
- Tuula Puputti Award (Goaltender of the Year): Emilia Kyrkkö, Team Kuortane
- Päivi Halonen Award (Defender of the Year): Siiri Yrjölä, HIFK
- Katja Riipi Award (Forward of the Year): Elisa Holopainen, KalPa
- Marianne Ihalainen Award (Top point scorer): Michaela Pejzlová, HIFK
- Tiia Reima Award (Top goal scorer): Elisa Holopainen, KalPa
- Sari Fisk Award (Best plus–minus): Michaela Pejzlová, HIFK
- Noora Räty Award (Rookie of the Year): Sanni Vanhanen, HIFK
- Emma Laaksonen Award (Fair-play player): Jenna Hietala, KalPa
- Karoliina Rantamäki Award (Playoff MVP): Sanni Vanhanen, HIFK
- Hannu Saintula Award (Coach of the Year): Saara Niemi, HIFK
- Student Athlete Award: Michaela Pejzlová, HIFK
- U18 Student Athlete Award: Kerttu Lehmus, Team Kuortane
- Anu Hirvonen Award (Best Referee): Anniina Nurmi
- Johanna Suban Award (Best Linesman): Salla Raitala

Source: Suomen Jääkiekkoliitto

=== Player of the Month ===
- September 2022: Emilia Kyrkkö (G), Team Kuortane
- October 2022: Julia Liikala (F), HIFK
- November 2022: Elisa Holopainen (F), KalPa
- December 2022: Kiti Seikkula (F), HPK
- January 2023: Emilia Vesa (F), HIFK
- February 2023: Pauliina Salonen (F), TPS
