= Clara Rozier =

French ice hockey player (born 1997)

- Born: 28 August 1997 (age 29) Évian-les-Bains, Auvergne-Rhône-Alpes, France
- Height: 1.61 m (5 ft 3 in)
- Weight: 62 kg (137 lb; 9 st 11 lb)
- Position: Forward
- Shoots: Right
- SWHL A team Former teams: SC Bern: HIFK Helsinki; Pingouins de Morzine-Avoriaz; Pôle France Féminin; HC Neuilly-sur-Marne
- National team: France
- Playing career: 2014–present

Clara Rozier (born 28 August 1997) is a French ice hockey player and member of the French national ice hockey team. She is signed in the Swiss Women's League (SWHL A) with the women's team of SC Bern for the 2024–25 season.

== Playing career ==
Rozier made her senior league debut in the French women's ice hockey championship with HC Neuilly-sur-Marne during the 2012–13 season.

After seven seasons playing in France – primarily with Pôle France Féminin, the French women's national development team – Rozier signed with HIFK Naiset in the Naisten Liiga (NSML) ahead of the 2020–21 season.

== International play ==
Rozier represented France at the Top Division tournament of the 2019 IIHF Women's World Championship.

She also competed for France at the 2026 Winter Olympics.

== Personal life ==
Rozier was born on 28 August 1997 in Évian-les-Bains, a town on the French shore of Lake Geneva.

She is in a relationship with former HIFK-teammate Mikaela Saukkonen.
