= 2026–27 Minnesota Golden Gophers women's ice hockey season =

- Conference: WCHA
- Home ice: Ridder Arena

Rankings
- USCHO.com: 2
- USA Hockey: 2

Record
- Overall: 13–1–0
- Conference: 9–1–0
- Home: 6–1–0
- Road: 7–0–0

Coaches and captains
- Head coach: Greg May (1st season)
- Assistant coaches: Marty Sertich; Amanda Leveille; Winny Brodt-Brown

The 2026–27 Minnesota Golden Gophers women's ice hockey season will represent the University of Minnesota during the 2026–27 NCAA Division I women's ice hockey season.

== Offseason ==
=== Departing players ===
Players who left the Gophers after last season
Player	Position	Class	Destination
Nelli Laitinen	Forward	Senior	Hamilton Havoc
Jamie Nelson	Forward	Graduated	Toronto Sceptres
Josefin Bouveng	Forward	Graduated	Vegas Vanguards
Abbey Murphy	Goaltender	Graduate	Seattle Torrent
Sydney Morrow	Defender	Senior	Seattle Torrent

=== Players drafted ===
Professional Women's Hockey League
Round	Player	Position	Team
1	Abbey Murphy	F	Seattle Torrent
1	Nelli Laitinen	F	Hamilton Havoc
2	Sydney Morrow	F	Seattle Torrent
2	Jamie Nelson	F	Toronto Sceptres
3	Josefin Bouveng	F	Vegas Vanguards

=== Recruiting ===
Players who joined the Gophers since last season
Player	Position	Nationality	Notes
Ashley Allard	Forward	United States	UConn
Lauren Goldsworthy	Defender	United States	Minnesota State
Sloane Hartmetz	Defender	United States	Shattuck-Saint Mary's; USA U-18 Women's National Team
Maddie McCullough	Forward	Canada	Etobicoke Dolphins; Canada U-18 Women's National Team
Adrianna Milani	Forward	Canada	Etobicoke Dolphins; Canada U-18 Women's National Team
Rachel Piggott	Forward	Canada	Etobicoke Dolphins; Canada U-18 Women's National Team
Payton Rolli	Goaltender	United States	Warroad High School
Katya Sander	Defender	United States	Holy Family Catholic High School; USA U-18 Women's National Team
Julia Schalin	Forward	Finland	Mercyhurst

== Roster ==
As of July 22, 2026

No.	Nat.	Player	Class	Pos	Height	DoB	Hometown	Previous team
1	(United States)	Layla Hemp	Sophomore	G	5' 7" (1.7 m)	2006-07-05	Chanhassen, Minnesota	Minnetonka High School
3	(United States)	Olivia Kortan	Sophomore	F	5' 4" (1.63 m)	2006-11-29	Moorhead, Minnesota	Moorhead High School
4	(United States)	Katya Sander	Freshman	D	5' 9" (1.75 m)	2008-03-04	Chanhassen, Minnesota	Holy Family
5	(United States)	Sydney Bailey	Sophomore	D	5' 7" (1.7 m)	2007-05-26	Rogers, Minnesota	Rogers High School
6	(United States)	Molly Jordan (A)	Senior	D	5' 6" (1.68 m)	2005-02-18	Berlin, Connecticut	Boston College (HEA)
8	(Canada)	Chloe Primerano (A)	Junior	D	5' 8" (1.73 m)	2007-01-02	North Vancouver, British Columbia	RINK-Kelowna
9	(United States)	Ava Lindsay (C)	Senior	F	5' 6" (1.68 m)	2005-02-20	Minnetonka, Minnesota	Minnetonka High School
11	(Finland)	Julia Schalin	Junior	F	5' 3" (1.6 m)	2005-08-31	Espoo, Finland	Mercyhurst (AHA)
12	(United States)	Avery Hovland	Sophomore	F	5' 3" (1.6 m)		West Fargo, North Dakota	North American Hockey Academy
13	(Hungary)	Emma Kreisz (A)	Senior	F	5' 9" (1.75 m)	2003-09-02	Budapest, Hungary	Stanstead College
14	(Canada)	Sienna D'Alessandro	Sophomore	F	5' 7" (1.7 m)	2006-01-05	Pointe-Claire, Quebec	John Abbott College
17	(United States)	Kendra Distad	Junior	F	5' 6" (1.68 m)	2006-02-25	Burnsville, Minnesota	Minnetonka High School
19	(Canada)	Sarah Paul	Graduate (RS)	F	5' 8" (1.73 m)	2003-07-20	Kelowna, British Columbia	Princeton (ECAC)
20	(United States)	Lauren Goldsworthy	Junior	D	5' 8" (1.73 m)	2006-05-19	Minnetonka, Minnesota	Minnesota State (WCHA)
22	(Czech Republic)	Tereza Plosová	Sophomore	F	5' 10" (1.78 m)	2006-07-05	Liberec, Czech Republic	Djurgårdens IF (SDHL)
24	(United States)	Carly Humphrey	Junior	D	5' 7" (1.7 m)	2006-03-03	Elk River, Minnesota	Elk River High School
29	(United States)	Madison Kaiser (C)	Senior (RS)	F	5' 7" (1.7 m)	2004-07-10	Ham Lake, Minnesota	Holy Family Catholic High School
32	(United States)	Payton Rolli	Freshman	G	5' 8" (1.73 m)	2008-06-05	Warroad, Minnesota	Warroad High School
43	(Canada)	Adrianna Milani	Freshman	F	5' 4" (1.63 m)	2009-03-19	Oakville, Ontario	Etobicoke Dolphins (OWHL)
47	(Canada)	Gracie Graham	Junior	D	5' 10" (1.78 m)	2006-01-09	Kelowna, British Columbia	RINK-Kelowna
53	(United States)	Sloane Hartmetz	Freshman	D	5' 3" (1.6 m)	2008-02-08	Phoenixville, Pennsylvania	Shattuck-Saint Mary's
56	(Canada)	Hannah Clark	Junior	G	5' 9" (1.75 m)	2006-05-12	Oshawa, Ontario	Etobicoke Dolphins (OWHL)
72	(Canada)	Rachel Piggott	Freshman	F	5' 3" (1.6 m)	2008-05-10	Richmond Hill, Ontario	Etobicoke Dolphins (OWHL)
92	(Canada)	Ashley Allard	Senior	F	5' 7" (1.7 m)	2005-07-29	Ottawa, Ontario	UConn Huskies (HEA)
93	(Canada)	Maddie McCullough	Freshman	F	5' 7" (1.7 m)	2008-03-20	Newmarket, Ontario	Etobicoke Dolphins (OWHL)
97	(United States)	Bella Fanale	Freshman	F	5' 5" (1.65 m)	2007-05-19	Webster, New York	Bishop Kearney Selects

== Standings ==
2026–27 Western Collegiate Hockey Association standings
	Conference										Overall					
	GP	W	L	T	OTW	OTL	SOW	PTS	GF	GA	GP	W	L	T	GF	GA
#1 Ohio State	8	7	1	0	0	0	0	21	34	21	12	11	1	0	49	23
#9 St. Cloud State	8	6	2	0	1	0	0	17	20	15	12	8	4	0	31	25
#2 Minnesota	6	5	1	0	1	0	0	14	27	17	10	9	1	0	51	21
#3 Wisconsin	6	4	2	0	0	0	0	12	30	12	10	8	2	0	53	15
#13 Minnesota Duluth	6	3	3	0	0	1	0	10	16	8	10	6	4	0	25	13
St. Thomas	8	2	6	0	0	1	0	7	13	21	10	4	6	0	23	24
Minnesota State	6	1	5	0	0	0	0	3	7	30	11	5	5	1	27	41
Bemidji State	8	0	8	0	0	0	0	0	9	32	10	1	9	0	15	37
Championship: March 6, 2027 † indicates conference regular season champion; * indicates conference tournament champion Rankings: USCHO.com; updated November 1, 2026

== Regular season ==
=== Schedule ===
Date	Time	Opponent^{#}	Rank^{#}	Site	Decision	Result	Attendance	Record	Ref
Regular season
October 2	6:00	at Bemidji State	#3	Sanford Center • Bemidji, MN	Clark	W 5–2	328	1–0–0 (1–0–0)	
October 3	2:00	at Bemidji State	#3	Sanford Center • Bemidji, MN	Hemp	W 5–3	444	2–0–0 (2–0–0)	
October 9	6:00	Maine*	#3	Ridder Arena • Minneapolis, MN (East/West Showcase)	Clark	W 4–0	2,196	3–0–0 (2–0–0)	
October 11	2:00	Bemidji State*	#3	Ridder Arena • Minneapolis, MN (East/West Showcase)	Hemp	W 4–2	1,237	4–0–0 (2–0–0)	
October 16	6:00	#1 Ohio State	#3	Ridder Arena • Minneapolis, MN	Clark	W 6–2	2,934	5–0–0 (3–0–0)	
October 17	2:00	#1 Ohio State	#3	Ridder Arena • Minneapolis, MN	Clark	L 5–6	2,373	5–1–0 (3–1–0)	
October 22	6:00	Lindenwood*	#2	Ridder Arena • Minneapolis, MN	Clark	W 11–0	1,074	6–1–0 (3–1–0)	
October 23	3:00	Lindenwood*	#2	Ridder Arena • Minneapolis, MN	Hemp	W 5–2	1,857	7–1–0 (3–1–0)	
October 30	6:00	at #13 Minnesota Duluth	#2	AMSOIL Arena • Duluth, MN	Clark	W 3–2 ^{OT}	1,071	8–1–0 (4–1–0)	
October 31	3:00	at #13 Minnesota Duluth	#2	AMSOIL Arena • Duluth, MN	Clark	W 3–2	1,017	9–1–0 (5–1–0)	
November 13	6:00	#9 St. Cloud State	#2	Ridder Arena • Minneapolis, MN	Clark	W 3–0	2,015	10–1–0 (6–1–0)	
November 14	1:00	at #9 St. Cloud State	#2	Herb Brooks National Hockey Center • St. Cloud, MN	Clark	W 5–2	544	11–1–0 (7–1–0)	
November 20	6:00	at St. Thomas	#2	Lee & Penny Anderson Arena • St. Paul, MN	Clark	W 4–1	1,007	12–1–0 (8–1–0)	
November 21	2:00	at St. Thomas	#2	Lee & Penny Anderson Arena • St. Paul, MN	Clark	W 6–1	779	13–1–0 (9–1–0)	
November 27	3:00	vs. Princeton*		Medstar Capitals Iceplex • Washington, D.C.	tbd	–	x	–– (––)	
November 28	3:00	vs. Penn State*		Medstar Capitals Iceplex • Washington, D.C.	tbd	–	x	–– (––)	
December 4	6:00	Wisconsin		Ridder Arena • Minneapolis, MN	tbd	–	x	–– (––)	
December 5	7:00	Wisconsin		Ridder Arena • Minneapolis, MN	tbd	–	x	–– (––)	
December 11	12:00	Minnesota State		Ridder Arena • Minneapolis, MN	tbd	–	x	–– (––)	
December 12	3:00	at Minnesota State		Mayo Clinic Health System Event Center • Mankato, MN	tbd	–	x	–– (––)	
January 8	6:00	Bemidji State		Ridder Arena • Minneapolis, MN	tbd	–	x	–– (––)	
January 9	2:00	Bemidji State		Ridder Arena • Minneapolis, MN	tbd	–	x	–– (––)	
January 15	6:00	Minnesota Duluth		Ridder Arena • Minneapolis, MN	tbd	–	x	–– (––)	
January 16	2:00	Minnesota Duluth		Ridder Arena • Minneapolis, MN	tbd	–	x	–– (––)	
January 22	5:00	at Ohio State		Ohio State University Ice Rink • Columbus, OH	tbd	–	x	–– (––)	
January 23	2:00	Ohio State		Ohio State University Ice Rink • Columbus, OH	tbd	–	x	–– (––)	
January 29	6:00	St. Thomas		Ridder Arena • Minneapolis, MN	tbd	–	x	–– (––)	
January 30	2:00	St. Thomas		Ridder Arena • Minneapolis, MN	tbd	–	x	–– (––)	
February 5	TBD	Wisconsin		LaBahn Arena • Madison, WI	tbd	–	x	–– (––)	
February 6	TBD	Wisconsin		LaBahn Arena • Madison, WI	tbd	–	x	–– (––)	
February 12	6:00	at Minnesota State		Mayo Clinic Health System Event Center • Mankato, MN	tbd	–	x	–– (––)	
February 13	2:00	Minnesota State		Ridder Arena • Minneapolis, MN	tbd	–	x	–– (––)	
February 19	6:00	at St. Cloud State		Herb Brooks National Hockey Center • St. Cloud, MN	tbd	–	x	–– (––)	
February 20	2:00	St. Cloud State		Ridder Arena • Minneapolis, MN	tbd	–	x	–– (––)	
*Non-conference game. ^{#}Rankings from USCHO.com Poll.

== Rankings ==
Poll	Week																									
Poll	Pre	1	2	3	4	5	6	7	8	9	10	11	12	13	14	15	16	17	18	19	20	21	22	23	24	Final
USCHO	3	–	3	3	3	2	2	2	2	2														–		
USA Hockey	3	3	3	3	3	2	2	2	2	2																

=== Notes ===
1.USCHO publishes Preseason, 21 weeks of in-season rankings, and a Final ranking.
2.USA Hockey publishes Preseason, 24 weeks of in-season rankings, and a Final ranking.

== Milestones ==
Regular season
Date	Player	Milestone
October 2, 2026	Greg May	First win as head coach
October 2, 2026	Maddie McCullough	First career goal
October 2, 2026	Maddie McCullough	First career multi point game
October 2, 2026	Adrianna Milani	First career goal
October 2, 2026	Adrianna Milani	First career multi point game
October 2, 2026	Sloane Hartmetz	First career assist
October 2, 2026	Sloane Hartmetz	First career multi point game
October 9, 2026	Julia Schalin	First goal as a Gopher
October 11, 2026	Sarah Paul	50th career goal
October 16, 2026	Ashley Allard	First goal as a Gopher
October 22, 2026	Rachel Piggott	First career goal
October 23, 2026	Adrianna Milani	10th goal of the season
October 23, 2026	Team	Program-record 73 shots on goal
October 30, 2026	Ava Lindsay	100th career point
October 31, 2026	Sloane Hartmetz	First career goal
October 31, 2026	Hannah Clark	50th career win
