= 2026–27 Wisconsin Badgers women's ice hockey season =

- Conference: WCHA
- Home ice: LaBahn Arena

Rankings
- USA Hockey: #3
- USCHO.com: #3

Record
- Overall: 10–2–0
- Conference: 6–2–0
- Home: 6–0–0
- Road: 4–2–0
- Neutral: 0–0–0

Coaches and captains
- Head coach: Mark Johnson
- Assistant coaches: Dan Koch; Jackie Crum; Mark Greenhalgh
- Captain: Kelly Gorbatenko
- Alternate captain(s): Ava McNaughton; Maggie Scannell; Laney Potter

The 2026–27 Wisconsin Badgers women's ice hockey season will represent the University of Wisconsin–Madison during the 2026–27 NCAA Division I women's ice hockey season. They will play their home games at LaBahn Arena and are coached by Mark Johnson in his 24th season.

== Standings ==
2026–27 Western Collegiate Hockey Association standings
	Conference										Overall					
	GP	W	L	T	OTW	OTL	SOW	PTS	GF	GA	GP	W	L	T	GF	GA
#1 Ohio State	8	7	1	0	0	0	0	21	34	21	12	11	1	0	49	23
#9 St. Cloud State	8	6	2	0	1	0	0	17	20	15	12	8	4	0	31	25
#2 Minnesota	6	5	1	0	1	0	0	14	27	17	10	9	1	0	51	21
#3 Wisconsin	6	4	2	0	0	0	0	12	30	12	10	8	2	0	53	15
#13 Minnesota Duluth	6	3	3	0	0	1	0	10	16	8	10	6	4	0	25	13
St. Thomas	8	2	6	0	0	1	0	7	13	21	10	4	6	0	23	24
Minnesota State	6	1	5	0	0	0	0	3	7	30	11	5	5	1	27	41
Bemidji State	8	0	8	0	0	0	0	0	9	32	10	1	9	0	15	37
Championship: March 6, 2027 † indicates conference regular season champion; * indicates conference tournament champion Rankings: USCHO.com; updated November 1, 2026

== Schedule and results ==
Date	Time	Opponent^{#}	Rank^{#}	Site	TV	Decision	Result	Attendance	Record
Regular Season
September 25	5:00 p.m.	at St. Lawrence*	#1	Appleton Arena • Canton, NY	ESPN+	Stewart	W 6–2	1,433	1–0–0
September 26	2:00 p.m.	at St. Lawrence*	#1	Appleton Arena • Canton, NY	ESPN+	Stewart	W 6–0	475	2–0–0
October 1	2:00 p.m.	Boston University*	#1	LaBahn Arena • Madison, WI	B1G+	McNaughton	W 7–0	2,273	3–0–0
October 2	5:00 p.m.	Boston University*	#1	LaBahn Arena • Madison, WI	B1G+	McNaughton	W 4–1	2,273	4–0–0
October 9	5:00 p.m.	at #2 Ohio State	#1	Ohio State University Ice Rink • Columbus, OH	B1G+	McNaughton	L 1–2	758	4–1–0 (0–1–0)
October 10	2:00 p.m.	at #2 Ohio State	#1	Ohio State University Ice Rink • Columbus, OH	B1G+	McNaughton	L 3–5	665	4–2–0 (0–2–0)
October 16	7:00 p.m.	Minnesota State	#2	LaBahn Arena • Madison, WI	B1G+	McNaughton	W 5–1	2,273	5–2–0 (1–2–0)
October 17	2:00 p.m.	Minnesota State	#2	LaBahn Arena • Madison, WI	B1G+	McNaughton	W 12–1	2,273	6–2–0 (2–2–0)
October 30	2:00 p.m.	at #9 St. Cloud State	#3	Herb Brooks National Hockey Center • St. Cloud, MN	B1G+	Stewart	W 2–1	237	7–2–0 (3–2–0)
October 31	1:00 p.m.	at #9 St. Cloud State	#3	Herb Brooks National Hockey Center • St. Cloud, MN	B1G+	McNaughton	W 7–2	237	8–2–0 (4–2–0)
November 14	2:00 p.m.	St. Thomas	#3	LaBahn Arena • Madison, WI		McNaughton	W 9–2	2,273	9–2–0 (5–2–0)
November 15	1:00 p.m.	St. Thomas	#3	LaBahn Arena • Madison, WI	B1G+	Stewart	W 2–1	2,273	10–2–0 (6–2–0)
November 21	2:00 p.m.	Bemidji State		LaBahn Arena • Madison, WI	–	–	–		
November 22	12:00 p.m.	Bemidji State		LaBahn Arena • Madison, WI	–	–	–		
November 28	2:00 p.m.	Union*		LaBahn Arena • Madison, WI	–	–	–		
November 29	1:00 p.m.	Union		LaBahn Arena • Madison, WI	–	–	–		
December 4	6:00 p.m.	at Minnesota		Ridder Arena • Minneapolis, MN	–	–	–		
December 7	7:00 p.m.	at Minnesota		Ridder Arena • Minneapolis, MN		–	–	–	
December 11	5:00 p.m.	Minnesota Duluth		LaBahn Arena • Madison, WI					
December 12	2:00 p.m.	Minnesota Duluth		LaBahn Arena • Madison, WI					
January 8	2:00 p.m.	at St. Thomas		Lee and Penny Anderson Arena • St. Paul, MN					
January 9	2:00 p.m.	at St. Thomas		Lee and Penny Anderson Arena • St. Paul, MN					
January 15	3:00 p.m.	at Minnesota State		Mayo Clinic Health System Event Center • Mankato, MN					
January 16	2:00 p.m.	at Minnesota State		Mayo Clinic Health System Event Center • Mankato, Minnesota					
January 22	7:00 p.m.	St. Cloud State		LaBahn Arena • Madison, WI					
January 23	6:00 p.m.	St. Cloud State		LaBahn Arena • Madison, WI					
January 29	12:00 p.m.	at Bemidji State		Sanford Center • Bemidji, MN					
January 30	12:00 p.m.	at Bemidji State		Sanford Center • Bemidji, MN					
February 6	TBA	Minnesota		LaBahn Arena • Madison, WI					
February 7	2:00 p.m.	Minnesota		LaBahn Arena • Madison, WI					
February 12	3:00 p.m.	at Minnesota Duluth		Amsoil Arena • Duluth, MN					
February 13	2:00 p.m.	at Minnesota Duluth		Amsoil Arena • Duluth, MN					
February 18	4:00 p.m.	Ohio State		LaBahn Arena • Madison, WI					
February 20	2:00 p.m.	Ohio State		Lambeau Field • Green Bay, Wisconsin (Frozen Tundra Faceoff)					
*Non-conference game. ^{#}Rankings from USCHO.com Poll. All times are in Central Time. Source:

== Rankings ==
Poll	Week																									
Poll	Pre	1	2	3	4	5	6	7	8	9	10	11	12	13	14	15	16	17	18	19	20	21	22	23	24	Final
USCHO	1 (13)	1 (17)	1 (16)	2	3	3	3	3	3															–		
USA Hockey	1 (11)	1 (12)	1 (13)	2 (1)	3	3	3	3	3																	

=== Notes ===
1.USCHO publishes Preseason, 21 weeks of in-season rankings, and a Final ranking.
2.USA Hockey publishes Preseason, 24 weeks of in-season rankings, and a Final ranking.
