= 2026–27 WCHA women's ice hockey season =

2026–27 WCHA women's season
- Season: 2026–27
- Conference: WCHA
- Division: Division I
- Sport: women's ice hockey
- Duration: September 19, 2026– February 20, 2027
- Number of teams: 8

The 2026–27 WCHA women's ice hockey season is the 28th season of the Western Collegiate Hockey Association and is taking place during the 2026–27 NCAA Division I women's ice hockey season. The regular season began on September 19, 2026, and will end on February 20, 2027.

== Standings ==
2026–27 Western Collegiate Hockey Association standings
	Conference										Overall					
	GP	W	L	T	OTW	OTL	SOW	PTS	GF	GA	GP	W	L	T	GF	GA
#1 Ohio State	8	7	1	0	0	0	0	21	34	21	12	11	1	0	49	23
#9 St. Cloud State	8	6	2	0	1	0	0	17	20	15	12	8	4	0	31	25
#2 Minnesota	6	5	1	0	1	0	0	14	27	17	10	9	1	0	51	21
#3 Wisconsin	6	4	2	0	0	0	0	12	30	12	10	8	2	0	53	15
#13 Minnesota Duluth	6	3	3	0	0	1	0	10	16	8	10	6	4	0	25	13
St. Thomas	8	2	6	0	0	1	0	7	13	21	10	4	6	0	23	24
Minnesota State	6	1	5	0	0	0	0	3	7	30	11	5	5	1	27	41
Bemidji State	8	0	8	0	0	0	0	0	9	32	10	1	9	0	15	37
Championship: March 6, 2027 † indicates conference regular season champion; * indicates conference tournament champion Rankings: USCHO.com; updated November 1, 2026

== Awards ==
=== Players of the Week ===
As of November 1, 2026.

Date	Forward of the Week	Defender of the Week	Goaltender of the Week	Rookie of the Week
September 28, 2026	Alice Sauriol (St. Cloud State)	Lucie Tenenbaum (Minnesota State)	Ève Gascon (Minnesota Duluth)	Rowan Houweling (Ohio State)
October 5, 2026	Maria Mikaelyn (St. Cloud State)	Mira Jungåker (Ohio State)	Alexis Ehrman (St. Cloud State)	Nela Lopušanová (Wisconsin)
October 12, 2026	Sanni Vanhanen (Ohio State)	Mira Jungåker (Ohio State)	Marilou Grenier (Minnesota Duluth)	Rowan Houweling (Ohio State)
October 19, 2026	Sarah Paul (Minnesota)	Mira Jungåker (Ohio State)	Ève Gascon (Minnesota Duluth)	Rosalie Tremblay (Wisconsin)
October 26, 2026	Jocelyn Amos (Ohio State)	Sloane Hartmetz (Minnesota)	Sophia Villanueva (Bemidji State)	Alexis Ehrman (St. Cloud State)
