= Linda Vocetková =

Czech ice hockey player (born 2007)

- Born: 22 March 2007 (age 19) Neratovice, Czech Republic
- Height: 1.74 m (5 ft 9 in)
- Weight: 70 kg (154 lb; 11 st 0 lb)
- Position: Forward
- Shoots: Right
- SDHL team Former teams: Djurgårdens IF; HC Příbram
- National team: Czech Republic
- Playing career: 2021–present

Linda Vocetková (born 22 March 2007) is a Czech ice hockey player. She has played with Djurgårdens IF in the Swedish Women's Hockey League (SDHL) since 2022.

Vocetková has been a member of the Czech national ice hockey team since 2025 and participated in the women's ice hockey tournament at the 2026 Winter Olympics.

== Playing career ==
Vocetková developed in the youth department of HC Buldoci Neratovice in her hometown of Neratovice, Czech Republic, and played on coed and boys teams throughout her childhood. During her final season in the Czech youth leagues, she played in the Liga 9. tříd, the premier boys national league for under-15 (U15) players, with HC Buldoci Neratovice U15 and ranked second on the team for scoring, with eleven goals and 21 assists for 32 points in 21 games.

In addition to playing with the youth teams of HC Buldoci Neratovice, Vocetková played in the Czech Women's Extraliga with HC Příbram during the 2021–22 and 2022–23 seasons. Across two seasons with the team, she tallied eight goals and eighteen points in seventeen regular season games, and seven goals and fourteen points in six playoff games. She won the Czech Championship with HC Příbram in 2022 and scored the championship clinching goal to win it again in 2023.

At age sixteen, Vocetková was recruited by Swedish ice hockey club Djurgårdens IF to play with its SDHL team. She played three seasons with the team, though an illness kept her from playing for almost three months at the beginning of the 2024–25 season and she missed thirteen regular season games.

Vocetková has committed to playing college ice hockey with the Colgate Raiders women's ice hockey program in the ECAC Hockey conference of the NCAA Division I, beginning in the 2026–27 season. She will be the third player from the Czech national program to join the Raiders, following in the footsteps of Noemi Neubauerová (graduated 2022) and Kristýna Kaltounková (graduated 2024).

== International play ==
Vocetková represented the Czech Republic as an alternate captain in the girls' ice hockey tournament at the Friuli-Venezia Giulia 2023 edition of the European Youth Olympic Winter Festival (EYOF). She led the team in scoring and ranked second of all tournament skaters with six goals and five assists across four games. Her contributions helped the Czech under-16 team claim a gold medal victory over Slovakia.

As a youth player with the Czech national under-18 team, she participated in three IIHF U18 Women's World Championships. She made an impressive debut at the 2023 U18 World Championship, scoring five points (3+2) in five games to rank third on the team in points, trailing only Adéla Šapovalivová and Tereza Plosová. Her play in the tournament earned selection as a top-three player on the Czech team by the coaches. She scored one goal in six games at the 2024 U18 World Championship, as the Czech Republic won the first silver medal in under-18 team history.

Vocetková spearheaded the Czech U18 team's bronze medal victory at the 2025 U18 World Championship, where she served as team captain, led all Czech players in scoring, and netted the medal winning goal against Sweden. Her seven points across six games placed her among the top-ten scorers in the tournament and her five goals tied for second of all tournament skaters (tied with Bella Fanale of the United States and Nela Lopušanová of Slovakia).

Vocetková joined the senior national team for the first time during training camp in August 2025. Her first appearance with the team was the four nations tournament of 2025–26 Women's Euro Hockey Tour during 5 to 8 November 2025 in Ängelholm, Sweden.

Vocetková made her major tournament debut with the senior national team on 5 February 2026 at the 2026 Winter Olympics, as the Czech Republic faced off versus the United States. Wearing number six, she logged 9:34 minutes of ice time in a 5–1 loss to the US. She was one of seventeen teenagers to participate in the women's ice hockey tournament at the 2026 Winter Olympics.
