= 2025–26 Mercyhurst Lakers women's ice hockey season =

- Conference: 2nd AHA
- Home ice: Mercyhurst Ice Center

Rankings
- USA Today/USA Hockey Magazine: 12
- USCHO.com: 12

Record
- Overall: 23–11–3
- Conference: 17–5–2
- Home: 11–7–2
- Road: 11–3–1
- Neutral: 1–1–0

Coaches and captains
- Head coach: Michael Sisti
- Assistant coaches: Trey Flesch; Scott Spencer; Natasha Hawkins
- Captain: Makayla Javier
- Alternate captain(s): Payten Evans; Jade Maisonneuve; Sofia Nuutinen

The Mercyhurst Lakers made it to the 2026 AHA Championship but fell to Penn State University in the AHA Championship Finals for the fourth consecutive season. The team did not qualify for the 26 NCAA Division I tournament for the sixth consecutive year.

This was head coach Michael Sisti's 27th season. Natasha Hawkins joined Scott Spencer and Trey Flesch on the coaching team as an assistant coach. She was previously with the College of Saint Scholastica as an assistant coach and the head of strength and conditioning.

During the Smashville Showcase, Sisti recorded his 600th career win, becoming just the second Division I women's hockey coach to reach this milestone.

With Vanessa Upson graduating, Makayla Javier was named captain for the season. Jade Maisonneuve, Sofia Nuutinen were named assistant captains with Payten Evans, a transfer from Merrimack College.

In the AHA preseason poll, the Lakers were voted to finish second in the AHA. Julia Schalin, the 2025 AHA Rookie of the Year, was one of three forwards named to the All-AHA Preseason Team. The Lakers would finish the season #12 in the USCHO Poll.

== Departures ==
Departed players from the previous season.

| Player | Position | Nationality | Reason |
| Megan McKay | Defense | United States | Transfer to Clarkson University |
| Thea Johansson | Forward | Sweden | Transfer to University of Minnesota-Duluth |
| Mary Kromer | Forward | United States | Graduation |
| Kylee Mahoney | Forward | Canada | Graduation |
| Jorden Mattison | Goaltender | Canada | Graduation |
| Marielle Parks | Forward | United States | Graduation |
| Sydney Pedersen | Defense | Canada | Graduation |
| Chantal Ste-Croix | Forward | Canada | Graduation |
| Mary Sweetapple | Defense | Canada | Graduation |
| Vanessa Upson | Forward | Canada | Graduation; drafted to the PWHL |

== Incoming ==
| Player | Position | Nationality | Notes |
| Maja Ålenius | Defense | Sweden | Played with Brynäs IF |
| Tara Bach | Goaltender | Canada | Played with the Germany U18 National Team |
| Avery Bryk | Forward | Canada | Played with Durham West Lightning |
| Jessica Ciarrocchi | Forward | United States | Graduate Transfer from Penn State |
| Kate Donegan | Forward | Canada | Played with the Whitby Wolves |
| Payten Evans | Defense | Canada | Transfer from Merrimack College |
| Nayeon Kim | Forward | South Korea | Played with the Korean U18 National Team |
| Emma Leibrecht | Forward | United States | Played with U19 Team Illinois |
| Berlin Lolacher | Forward | Canada | Played with Regina Rebels |
| Sophie McKinley | Forward | Canada | Transfer from Merrimack College |
| Madison Nelson | Forward | Canada | Played with Mississauga Hurricanes |
| Abby Poitras | Defense | Canada | Transfer from Merrimack College |
| Lexi Stanat | Defense | Canada | Played with Burlington Barracudas |
| Holly VanNetten | Defense | Canada | Played with Stoney Creek Sabres |

== Standings ==
2025–26 Atlantic Hockey America standings
| | Conference | | | | | | | Overall | | | | | |
| | GP | W | L | T | PTS | GF | GA | GP | W | L | T | GF | GA |
|---|---|---|---|---|---|---|---|---|---|---|---|---|---|
| #3 Penn State †* | 24 | 22 | 2 | 0 | 68 | 117 | 27 | 39 | 33 | 6 | 0 | 165 | 54 |
| #12 Mercyhurst | 24 | 17 | 5 | 2 | 49 | 85 | 42 | 37 | 23 | 11 | 3 | 117 | 73 |
| RIT | 24 | 11 | 13 | 0 | 34 | 71 | 67 | 34 | 16 | 18 | 0 | 100 | 88 |
| Lindenwood | 24 | 11 | 12 | 1 | 35 | 67 | 78 | 37 | 14 | 21 | 2 | 95 | 119 |
| Syracuse | 24 | 10 | 11 | 3 | 33 | 44 | 66 | 37 | 15 | 18 | 4 | 69 | 106 |
| Robert Morris | 24 | 8 | 14 | 2 | 28 | 52 | 73 | 36 | 13 | 21 | 2 | 82 | 102 |
| Delaware | 24 | 1 | 23 | 0 | 5 | 24 | 107 | 33 | 2 | 31 | 0 | 35 | 141 |
Championship: March 7, 2026 † indicates conference regular season champion; * indicates conference tournament champion Rankings: USCHO.com; updated March 20, 2026

== Roster ==
The Lakers saw a significant change in their roster with 14 new additions this year. Julia Perjus was a redshirt for the season as she was named to the Finnish Olympic Team for the 2026 Winter Olympics.

As of June 28, 2026

| No. | Nat. | Player | Class | Pos | Height | DoB | Hometown | Previous team |
|---|---|---|---|---|---|---|---|---|
| 1 | (Canada) | Erika Lind | Junior | G | 6' 0" (1.83 m) | 2005-03-17 | Edmonton, AB | Northern Alberta Xtreme (CSSHL) |
| 2 | (United States) | Jessica Ciarrocchi | Graduate | F | 5' 4" (1.63 m) | 2002-02-24 | West Chester, PA | Penn State (NCAA) |
| 4 | (Canada) | Payten Evans (A) | Senior | D | 5' 9" (1.75 m) | 2004-05-29 | Calgary, AB | Merrimack College (NCAA) |
| 5 | (United States) | Ashley Mandeville | Sophomore | D | 5' 7" (1.7 m) | 2005-06-27 | Pascoag, RI | Bishop Kearney Selects U19 |
| 6 | (Canada) | Kate Donegan | Freshman | F | 5' 4" (1.63 m) | 2006-11-00 | Whitby, ON | Whitby Wolves (OWHL) |
| 7 | (South Korea) | Nayeon Kim | Freshman | F | 5' 5" (1.65 m) | 2006-09-01 | Gyeonggi-do, Korea | OHA Mavericks Tardiff (OWHL) |
| 8 | (Sweden) | Sofia Ljung | Junior | D | 5' 7" (1.7 m) | 2004-01-23 | Hudiksvall,Sweden | Brynäs IF (SHL) |
| 9 | (Sweden) | Maja Alenius | Freshman | D | 5' 10" (1.78 m) | 2005-05-01 | Gävle,Sweden | Brynäs IF (SHL) |
| 10 | (Finland) | Emmi Mourujärvi | Junior | D | 5' 10" (1.78 m) | 2003-03-23 | Kuusamo, Finland | Kerttuli Lukio (Auroraliiga) |
| 11 | (United States) | Makayla Javier (C) | Senior | F | 5' 6" (1.68 m) | 2003-12-01 | Abingdon, MD | Philadelphia Jr. Flyers (JWHL) |
| 12 | (Canada) | Madison Nelson | Freshman | F | 5' 5" (1.65 m) | 2007-00-00 | Burlington, ON | Mississauga Hurricanes U22 (OWHL) |
| 13 | (Canada) | Berlin Lolacher | Freshman | F | 5' 5" (1.65 m) | 2007-10-31 | Pilot Butte, SK | Regina Rebels (SFMAAAHL) |
| 14 | (Finland) | Julia Schalin | Sophomore | F | 5' 3" (1.6 m) | 2005-08-31 | Espoo, Finland | Kiekko Espoo (Auroraliiga) |
| 15 | (Sweden) | Julia Perjus | Freshman (RS) | F | 5' 8" (1.73 m) | 2004-11-17 | Stockholm, Sweden | MoDo Hockey (SHDL) |
| 16 | (Canada) | Henlee Mahoney | Junior | F | 5' 7" (1.7 m) | 2005-00-00 | Niagara Falls, ON | Stoney Creek Sabres (OWHL) |
| 18 | (Canada) | Avery Bryk | Freshman | F | 5' 7" (1.7 m) | 2007-00-00 | Whitby, ON | Durham West Jr. Lightning |
| 19 | (Canada) | Jade Maisonneuve (A) | Senior | F | 5' 4" (1.63 m) | 2003-09-23 | St-Isidore, ON | Nepean Wildcats (OWHL) |
| 21 | (Hungary) | Regina Metzler | Sophomore | F | 5' 10" (1.78 m) | 2005-10-25 | Budapest, Hungary | OHA Mavericks U22 (OWHL) |
| 22 | (Finland) | Sofia Nuutinen (A) | Junior | F | 5' 7" (1.7 m) | 2002-06-14 | Vantaa, Finland | Finland National Team |
| 23 | (Canada) | Lexi Stanat | Freshman | D | 5' 11" (1.8 m) | 2006-01-04 | St. Thomas, ON | Burlington Barracudas (OWHL) |
| 24 | (Canada) | Sophie McKinley | Senior | F | 5' 7" (1.7 m) | 2004-11-26 | St. Albert, AB | Merrimack College (NCAA) |
| 26 | (Canada) | Abby Poitras | Sophomore | D | 5' 9" (1.75 m) | 2006-02-07 | Whitby, ON | Merrimack College (NCAA) |
| 27 | (Canada) | Holly VanNetten | Freshman | D | 5' 8" (1.73 m) | 2007-12-11 | Simcoe, ON | Stoney Creek Sabres (OWHL) |
| 28 | (United States) | Emma Leibrecht | Freshman | F | 5' 10" (1.78 m) | 2006-00-00 | Wildwood, MO | Lafayette High (USHS–MO) |
| 30 | (Canada) | Tara Bach | Freshman | G | 5' 10" (1.78 m) | 2008-02-13 | Münsterlingen, Switzerland | Stoney Creek Sabres (OWHL) |
| 31 | (Austria) | Magdalena Luggin | Sophomore | G | 5' 9" (1.75 m) | 2005-11-06 | Vienna, Austria | SKN Sabres St.Pölten (EWHL) |
| 34 | (Canada) | Avery Norman | Sophomore | G | 5' 6" (1.68 m) | 2005-00-00 | Nepean, ON | Nepean Wildcats (OWHL) |

== Schedule ==
The Lakers played two neutral site games in Nashville as part of the Smashville NCAA Women's Hockey Showcase.

| Date | Time | Opponent^{#} | Rank^{#} | Site | Decision | Result | Attendance | Record | Ref |
Regular Season
| September 19 | 6:00 pm | #6 Minnesota Duluth* | #RV | Mercyhurst Ice Center • Erie, PA | Luggin | L 3–4 ^{OT} | 1,123 | 0–1–0 (0–0–0) | |
| September 20 | 1:00 pm | #6 Minnesota Duluth* | #RV | Mercyhurst Ice Center • Erie, PA | Luggin | L 3–5 | 876 | 0–2–0 (0–0–0) | |
| September 25 | 6:00 pm | at New Hampshire* | #RV | Whittemore Center • Durham, NH | Luggin | W 3–2 | 452 | 1–2–0 (0–0–0) | |
| September 26 | 12:30 pm | at New Hampshire* | #RV | Whittemore Center • Durham, NH | Bach | W 4–0 | 247 | 2–2–0 (0–0–0) | |
| October 13 | 6:00 pm | #14 St. Lawrence* | #15 | Mercyhurst Ice Center • Erie, PA | Luggin | W 1–0 | 987 | 3–2–0 (0–0–0) | |
| October 14 | 1:00 pm | #14 St. Lawrence* | #15 | Mercyhurst Ice Center • Erie, PA | Luggin | L 0–3 | 1,004 | 3–3–0 (0–0–0) | |
| October 17 | 3:00 pm | at #6 Penn State | #15 | Pegula Ice Arena • University Park, PA | Luggin | L 0–3 | 484 | 3–4–0 (0–1–0) | |
| October 18 | 1:00 pm | at #6 Penn State | #15 | Pegula Ice Arena • University Park, PA | Luggin | L 1–6 | 700 | 3–5–0 (0–2–0) | |
| October 24 | 3:00 pm | #8 Connecticut* | #RV | Mercyhurst Ice Center • Erie, PA | Luggin | T 1–1 ^{SO L} | 578 | 3–5–1 (0–2–0) | |
| October 25 | 1:00 pm | #8 Connecticut* | #RV | Mercyhurst Ice Center • Erie, PA | Luggin | L 3–4 | 780 | 3–6–1 (0–2–0) | |
| October 31 | 3:00 pm | Delaware | #RV | Mercyhurst Ice Center • Erie, PA | Luggin | W 3–2 ^{OT} | 376 | 4–6–1 (1–2–0) | |
| November 1 | 1:00 pm | Delaware | #RV | Mercyhurst Ice Center • Erie, PA | Bach | W 4–0 | 245 | 5–6–1 (2–2–0) | |
| November 7 | 3:00 pm | at Robert Morris | #RV | Clearview Arena • Moon Township, PA | Luggin | W 5–1 | 122 | 6–6–1 (3–2–0) | |
| November 8 | 3:00 pm | at Robert Morris | #RV | Clearview Arena • Moon Township, PA | Luggin | W 7–2 | 412 | 7–6–1 (4–2–0) | |
| November 14 | 6:00 pm | RIT | #RV | Mercyhurst Ice Center • Erie, PA | Luggin | W 1–0 | 207 | 8–6–1 (5–2–0) | |
| November 15 | 1:00 pm | RIT | #RV | Mercyhurst Ice Center • Erie, PA | Luggin | L 0–1 | 153 | 8–7–1 (5–3–0) | |
| November 21 | 6:00 pm | at Syracuse | #RV | Tennity Ice Pavilion • Syracuse, NY | Luggin | T 2–2 | 167 | 8–7–2 (5–3–1) | |
| November 22 | 3:00 pm | at Syracuse | #RV | Tennity Ice Pavilion • Syracuse, NY | Luggin | W 3–2 | 144 | 9–7–2 (6–3–1) | |
| November 28 | 6:00 pm ET | vs. Stonehill* | #RV | Ford Ice Center (Smashville Series) • Nashville, Tennessee | Luggin | W 6–1 | 267 | 10–7–2 (6–3–1) | |
| November 29 | 4:00 pm ET | vs. #1 Wisconsin* | #RV | Ford Ice Center (Smashville Series) • Nashville, Tennessee | Luggin | L 1–5 | 530 | 10–8–2 (6–3–1) | |
| December 5 | 5:00 pm | Lindenwood | #RV | Mercyhurst Ice Center • Erie, PA | Luggin | W 10–1 | 345 | 11–8–2 (7–3–1) | |
| December 6 | 12:00 pm | Lindenwood | #RV | Mercyhurst Ice Center • Erie, PA | Luggin | L 2–5 | 145 | 11–9–2 (7–4–1) | |
| January 2 | 5:00 pm | at Lindenwood | #RV | Centene Community Ice Center • St. Charles, MO | Bach | W 5–1 | 213 | 12–9–2 (8–4–1) | |
| January 3 | 1:00 pm | at Lindenwood | #RV | Centene Community Ice Center • St. Charles, MO | Bach | W 2–1 ^{OT} | 157 | 13–9–2 (9–4–1) | |
| January 9 | 3:00 pm | #4 Penn State | #RV | Mercyhurst Ice Center • Erie, PA | Luggin | L 0–3 | 245 | 13–10–2 (9–5–1) | |
| January 10 | 1:00 pm | #4 Penn State | #RV | Mercyhurst Ice Center • Erie, PA | Luggin | W 4–3 ^{OT} | 479 | 14–10–2 (10–5–1) | |
| January 16 | 6:00 pm | at RIT | #RV | Gene Polisseni Center • Rochester, NY | Luggin | W 5–3 | 858 | 15–10–2 (11–5–1) | |
| January 17 | 3:00 pm | at RIT | #RV | Gene Polisseni Center • Rochester, NY | Luggin | W 2–1 ^{OT} | 549 | 16–10–2 (12–5–1) | |
| January 23 | 3:00 pm | Robert Morris | #RV | Mercyhurst Ice Center • Erie, PA | Luggin | W 5–1 | 256 | 17–10–2 (13–5–1) | |
| January 24 | 1:00 pm | Robert Morris | #RV | Mercyhurst Ice Center • Erie, PA | Luggin | W 5–1 | 378 | 18–10–2 (14–5–1) | |
| January 30 | 6:00 pm | at Delaware | #15 | Fred Rust Ice Arena • Newark, Delaware | Luggin | W 4–0 | 368 | 19–10–2 (15–5–1) | |
| January 31 | 2:00 pm | at Delaware | #15 | Fred Rust Ice Arena • Newark, Delaware | Bach | W 6–1 | 359 | 20–10–2 (16–5–1) | |
| February 13 | 6:00 pm | Syracuse | #13 | Mercyhurst Ice Center • Erie, PA | Luggin | T 2–2 ^{SO L} | 854 | 20–10–3 (16–5–2) | |
| February 14 | 1:00 pm | Syracuse | #13 | Mercyhurst Ice Center • Erie, PA | Bach | W 7–0 | 907 | 21–10–3 (17–5–2) | |
AHA Tournament
| February 27 | 3:00 pm | Lindenwood | #12 | Mercyhurst Ice Center (Semifinals) • Erie, PA | Luggin | W 2–1 | 689 | 22–10–3 (18–5–2) | |
| February 28 | 1:00 pm | Lindenwood | #12 | Mercyhurst Ice Center (Semifinals) • Erie, PA | Luggin | W 3–2 ^{2OT} | 807 | 23–10–3 (19–5–2) | |
| March 7 | 2:00 pm | at #3 Penn State | #12 | Pegula Ice Arena (Finals) • University Park, PA | Luggin | L 2–3 | 1,246 | 23–11–3 (19–6–2) | |
*Non-conference game. ^{#}Rankings from USCHO.com Poll.

== Awards and honors ==
Weekly Awards
| Player | Award | Date Awarded | Ref. |
|---|---|---|---|
| Makayla Javier | AHA Defenseman of the Week | September 30, 2025 | |
| Magdalena Luggin | AHA Goalie of the Week | October 7, 2025 | |
| Holly VanNetten | AHA Defenseman of the Week | November 4, 2025 | |
| Julia Schalin | AHA Forward of the Week | November 11, 2025 | |
| Magdalena Luggin | AHA Goalie of the Week | November 11, 2025 | |
| Julia Schalin | AHA Forward of the Week | December 9, 2025 | |
| Julia Perjus | AHA Rookie of the Week | December 9, 2025 | |
| Sofia Nuutinen | AHA Forward of the Week | January 6, 2026 | |
| Sofia Ljung | AHA Defenseman of the Week | January 6, 2026 | |
| Tara Bach | AHA Goalie of the Week | January 6, 2026 | |
| Payten Evans | AHA Defenseman of the Week | January 13, 2026 | |
| Abby Poitras | AHA Defenseman of the Week | January 20, 2026 | |
| Magdalena Luggin | AHA Goalie of the Week | January 20, 2026 | |
| Sofia Nuutinen | AHA Forward of the Week | January 27, 2026 | |
| Magdalena Luggin | AHA Goalie of the Week | January 27, 2026 | |
| Berlin Lolacher | AHA Rookie of the Week | February 3, 2026 | |
| Jade Maisonneuve | AHA Forward of the Week | February 17, 2026 | |
| Tara Bach | AHA Goalie of the Week | February 17, 2026 | |
| Holly VanNetten | AHA Rookie of the Week | February 17, 2026 | |

Monthly Awards
| Player | Award | Month | Ref. |
|---|---|---|---|
| Payten Evans | AHA Defenseman of the Month | December | |
| Julia Perjus | AHA Rookie of the Month | December | |
| Magdalena Luggin | AHA Goaltender of the Month | January | |
| Julia Perjus | AHA Rookie of the Month | January | |

Annual Awards & Honors
| Player | Award |
|---|---|
| Julia Perjus | All-AHA Second Team |
| Payten Evans | All-AHA Second Team |
| Magdalena Luggin | All-AHA Second Team |
| Julia Perjus | AHA All-Rookie Team |
| Mercyhurst Lakers | Team Sportsmanship Award |
