= 2025 IIHF U18 Women's World Championship =

Tournament details
- Host country: Finland
- City: Vantaa
- Venue: 1 (in 1 host city)
- Dates: 4–12 January 2025
- Teams: 8

Final positions
- Champions: Canada (8th title)
- Runners-up: United States
- Third place: Czechia
- Fourth place: Sweden

Tournament statistics
- Games played: 21
- Goals scored: 130 (6.19 per game)
- Attendance: 10,292 (490 per game)
- Scoring leader: (Canada) Stryker Zablocki (12 points)

Awards
- MVP: (Slovakia) Nela Lopušanová

Official website
- www.iihf.com

The 2025 IIHF U18 Women's World Championship was the 17th U18 Women's World Championship in ice hockey.

== Top Division ==
The Top Division tournament was held in Tikkurila Arena, Vantaa, Finland, from 4 to 12 January 2025.

=== Preliminary round ===
All times are local (UTC+2).

==== Group A ====
Pos	Team	Pld	W	OTW	OTL	L	GF	GA	GD	Pts	Qualification
1	United States	3	3	0	0	0	14	0	+14	9	Quarterfinals
2	Sweden	3	0	2	0	1	7	8	−1	4 (Note: Finland 1–2 (OT) Sweden)	Quarterfinals
3	Finland (H)	3	1	0	1	1	5	9	−4	4	Quarterfinals
4	Japan	3	0	0	1	2	6	15	−9	1	Quarterfinals

Source: IIHF
Rules for classification: 1) points; 2) head-to-head points; 3) head-to-head goal difference; 4) head-to-head number of goals scored; 5) result against closest best-ranked team outside tied teams; 6) result against second-best-ranked team outside tied teams; 7) seeding before tournament
(H) Host
Notes:

4 January 2025; 10:00	United States	6–0 (2–0, 3–0, 1–0)	Japan	Tikkurila Arena, Vantaa; Attendance: 288

Morgan Stickney
Goalies
Haruka Kuromaru
Rio Suzuki
Referees:
(Czech Republic) Martina Volkánová
(Switzerland) Karin Williner
Linesmen:
(Germany) Lara Fischer
(Switzerland) Jennifer Vicha

Box (Doyle, Healy) – 04:16	1–0
Scalese (Biotti, C. Averill) – 17:09	2–0
M. Averill (Lovell, Derrenbacher) – 26:14	3–0
Fanale (Stoughton, Scalese) – 32:09	4–0
Biotti (Derrenbacher, Box) – 38:04	5–0
Derrenbacher (Fischer, Box) – 52:04	6–0

2 min
Penalties
6 min
67
Shots
4

4 January 2025; 13:30	Finland	1–2 OT (0–0, 0–1, 1–0) (OT: 0–1)	Sweden	Tikkurila Arena, Vantaa; Attendance: 1,592

Kerttu Kuja-Halkola
Goalies
Maja Helge
Referees:
(Germany) Vanessa Anselm
(United States) Syndey Harris
Linesmen:
(Canada) Stephanie Gagnon
(United States) Abigail Torres

	0–1	31:35 – Danielsson (Hesselvall, Johannesson)
Siivonen (Pohjanaho, Tapani) (PP) – 47:11	1–1
	1–2	62:30 – Westerlind (Grillfors)

8 min
Penalties
12 min
17
Shots
34

5 January 2025; 10:00	Sweden	0–3 (0–0, 0–1, 0–2)	United States	Tikkurila Arena, Vantaa; Attendance: 332

Maja Helge
Goalies
Morgan Stickney
Referees:
(Canada) Amy Martin
(United Kingdom) Hollie Neenan
Linesmen:
(Hungary) Zóra Gottlibet
(Switzerland) Anina Schüpbach

0–1	31:45 – Scalese (C. Averill, Johnson)
0–2	42:31 – Doyle (Fanale, Healy) (PP)
0–3	59:38 – Amelkovich (EN)

8 min
Penalties
8 min
21
Shots
31

5 January 2025; 13:30	Finland	4–2 (1–1, 0–1, 3–0)	Japan	Tikkurila Arena, Vantaa; Attendance: 911

Kerttu Kuja-Halkola
Goalies
Haruka Kuromaru
Referees:
(Sweden) Sabina Küller
(Italy) Anneke Orlandini
Linesmen:
(United States) Brooke Branson
(Canada) Stephanie Gagnon

	0–1	17:50 – Odaira
Kuhta (Byskata, Pohjanaho) (PP) – 19:21	1–1
	1–2	31:45 – Akimoto (Odaira, Kakuta) (PP)
Lamberg (Kolmonen, Ketola) (PP) – 45:23	2–2
Kolmonen (Ruonakoski) – 56:42	3–2
Nurmisto (Tapani) (EN) – 58:56	4–2

4 min
Penalties
12 min
28
Shots
14

7 January 2025; 13:30	Japan	4–5 OT (1–1, 3–2, 0–1) (OT: 0–1)	Sweden	Tikkurila Arena, Vantaa; Attendance: 211

Haruka Kuromaru
Goalies
Jorinde Heller
Referees:
(Finland) Reetta-Kaisa Lusi
(Canada) Amy Martin
Linesmen:
(Sweden) Otillia Classon
(Germany) Lara Fischer

	0–1	12:30 – Danielsson (Engström, Lindgren)
Ruike (Kiyokawa, Yamaguchi) (PP) – 18:20	1–1
Kakuta (Terauchi) – 20:29	2–1
Yamaguchi (Kiyokawa, Ruike) (PP) – 24:30	3–1
	3–2	28:45 – Österman (Hesselvall, Arvidsson) (PP)
	3–3	29:57 – Mattsson (Edsman, Westerlind)
Akimoto (Odaira) – 33:53	4–3
	4–4	52:01 – Danielsson (PP)
	4–5	64:49 – Hesselvall (Westerlind, Engström)

4 min
Penalties
10 min
27
Shots
27

7 January 2025; 17:00	United States	5–0 (1–0, 3–0, 1–0)	Finland	Tikkurila Arena, Vantaa; Attendance: 828

Morgan Stickney
Goalies
Kerttu Kuja-Halkola
Referees:
(Italy) Anneke Orlandini
(Czech Republic) Martina Volkánová
Linesmen:
(Hungary) Zóra Gottlibet
(Switzerland) Jennifer Vicha

Doyle (Fanale, Derrenbacher) (PP) – 08:52	1–0
Johnson (Scalese) – 26:11	2–0
Hartmetz (Dunn, Stoughton) – 31:03	3–0
Amelkovich (Daley, Fanale) – 39:52	4–0
Fanale (Healy, Amelkovich) – 52:45	5–0

4 min
Penalties
8 min
59
Shots
7

==== Group B ====
Pos	Team	Pld	W	OTW	OTL	L	GF	GA	GD	Pts	Qualification
1	Canada	3	3	0	0	0	16	3	+13	9	Quarterfinals
2	Czechia	3	1	1	0	1	8	9	−1	5	Quarterfinals
3	Switzerland	3	1	0	1	1	7	10	−3	4	Quarterfinals
4	Slovakia	3	0	0	0	3	8	17	−9	0	Quarterfinals

Source: IIHF
Rules for classification: 1) points; 2) head-to-head points; 3) head-to-head goal difference; 4) head-to-head number of goals scored; 5) result against closest best-ranked team outside tied teams; 6) result against second-best-ranked team outside tied teams; 7) seeding before tournament

4 January 2025; 17:00	Czechia	2–1 OT (0–0, 0–0, 1–1) (OT: 1–0)	Switzerland	Tikkurila Arena, Vantaa; Attendance: 233

Daniela Nováková
Goalies
Amaya Iseli
Referees:
(Sweden) Sabina Küller
(Canada) Amy Martin
Linesmen:
(Norway) Maren Frøhaug
(Hungary) Zóra Gottlibet

	0–1	47:11 – Inkamp (Meriguet, Herzig)
Jílková (Vocetková, Hujová) (PP, EA) – 57:52	1–1
Jebousková (Pánková) – 61:33	2–1

8 min
Penalties
12 min
38
Shots
24

4 January 2025; 20:30	Canada	6–2 (2–1, 0–1, 4–0)	Slovakia	Tikkurila Arena, Vantaa; Attendance: 268

Marilou Grenier
Goalies
Marianna Sumegová
Zuzana Tomečková
Referees:
(Sweden) Anna Hammar
(Finland) Reetta-Kaisa Lusi
Linesmen:
(Sweden) Otillia Classon
(Austria) Anja Klemm

McDonald (S. Manness, Cimoroni) – 07:05	1–0
	1–1	14:32 – Tóthová (Lopušanová) (PP)
Cimoroni (S. Manness) – 15:22	2–1
	2–2	24:59 – Lopušanová (Komloš)
Maynard – 43:02	3–2
Primerano (Bertelsen, Wood) – 45:13	4–2
Zablocki (Tiller) – 46:41	5–2
Viel (Tiller) (PP) – 53:54	6–2

10 min
Penalties
8 min
60
Shots
7

5 January 2025; 17:00	Slovakia	3–6 (1–2, 2–2, 0–2)	Czechia	Tikkurila Arena, Vantaa; Attendance: 259

Marianna Sumegová
Goalies
Daniela Nováková
Referees:
(United States) Syndey Harris
(Switzerland) Karin Williner
Linesmen:
(Austria) Anja Klemm
(Switzerland) Jennifer Vicha

Lopušanová (Lačná) – 03:46	1–0
	1–1	06:49 – Vocetková (Prošková, Jarabková)
	1–2	19:04 – Vocetková (Prošková, Paroubková)
Lopušanová (Tóthová, Masláková) (PP) – 24:13	2–2
Lopušanová (Tóthová, Tischlerová) – 29:38	3–2
	3–3	38:02 – Felcmanová (Březinová)
	3–4	39:04 – Prošková (Fromová, Tischler)
	3–5	45:31 – Březinová (Jebousková, Fromová)
	3–6	58:43 – Jebousková (Stýblová, Pánková)

10 min
Penalties
14 min
25
Shots
52

5 January 2025; 20:30	Canada	5–1 (0–0, 4–1, 1–0)	Switzerland	Tikkurila Arena, Vantaa; Attendance: 307

Amelia Wilkinson
Goalies
Amaya Iseli
Referees:
(Finland) Reetta-Kaisa Lusi
(Czech Republic) Martina Volkánová
Linesmen:
(Germany) Lara Fischer
(United States) Abigail Torres

Primerano – 23:51	1–0
Copetti (Leprohon, Sorokan) – 26:03	2–0
S. Manness (Cimoroni, Zablocki) (PP) – 30:00	3–0
	3–1	31:01 – Manetsch (Huwyler)
Copetti (Wood, K. Manness) – 35:38	4–1
McDonald (S. Manness, Cimoroni) (PP) – 44:25	5–1

12 min
Penalties
8 min
60
Shots
11

7 January 2025; 10:00	Switzerland	5–3 (0–0, 3–1, 2–2)	Slovakia	Tikkurila Arena, Vantaa; Attendance: 291

Amaya Iseli
Goalies
Marianna Sumegová
Referees:
(Sweden) Anna Hammar
(United Kingdom) Hollie Neenan
Linesmen:
(Norway) Maren Frøhaug
(Austria) Anja Klemm

	0–1	21:31 – Lačná (Tóthová, Lopušanová) (PP2)
Müller (Manetsch) – 22:12	1–1
Müller – 23:15	2–1
Mériguet (Inkamp, Herzig) – 34:32	3–1
	3–2	41:22 – Lačná (Lopušanová)
Estermann (Dalessi) (PP) – 43:49	4–2
Tschannen (Leibundgut, Manetsch) (PP) – 54:55	5–2
	5–3	59:52 – Lačná (Lopušanová) (EA)

18 min
Penalties
8 min
27
Shots
25

7 January 2025; 20:30	Czechia	0–5 (0–1, 0–1, 0–3)	Canada	Tikkurila Arena, Vantaa; Attendance: 296

Daniela Nováková
Goalies
Marilou Grenier
Referees:
(Germany) Vanessa Anselm
(Switzerland) Karin Williner
Linesmen:
(United States) Brooke Branson
(Switzerland) Anina Schüpbach

0–1	01:20 – Zablocki (Sawyer, Viel)
0–2	34:21 – Therien (Sorokan, Tremblay)
0–3	43:00 – Zablocki (Primerano, Korte)
0–4	43:19 – Sawyer (Copetti, Viel)
0–5	54:55 – Leprohon (McDonald, Cimoroni)

12 min
Penalties
14 min
20
Shots
44

=== Playoff round ===
Winning teams were reseeded for the semi-finals in accordance with the following ranking:

1. Higher position in their group
2. Higher number of points in preliminary pool play
3. Better goal differential
4. Higher number of goals scored
5. Better seeding coming into the tournament (final placement at the 2023 IIHF World Women's U18 Championship).

Rank	Team	Group	Pos	Pts	GD	GF	Seed
1	United States	A	1	9	+14	14	1
2	Canada	B	1	9	+13	16	3
3	Czechia	B	2	5	–1	8	2
4	Sweden	A	2	4	–1	7	5
5	Switzerland	B	3	4	–3	7	7
6	Finland	A	3	4	–4	5	4
7	Japan	A	4	1	–9	6	8
8	Slovakia	B	4	0	−9	8	6

==== Bracket ====
Quarterfinals
9 January
1A United States	9
4B Slovakia	1
9 January
1B Canada	17
4A Japan	0
9 January
2A Sweden	4
3B Switzerland	1
9 January
2B Czechia	6
3A Finland	0

Semifinals
11 January
1 United States	2
4 Sweden	1
11 January
2 Canada	4
3 Czechia	2

Final
12 January
1 United States	0
2 Canada	3
Third place
12 January
3 Czechia	2
4 Sweden	1

==== Quarterfinals ====
9 January 2025; 10:00	Sweden	4–1 (0–0, 3–0, 1–1)	Switzerland	Tikkurila Arena, Vantaa; Attendance: 404

Maja Helge
Goalies
Amaya Iseli
Referees:
(United States) Sydney Harris
(Czech Republic) Martina Volkánová
Linesmen:
(Canada) Stephane Gagnon
(Switzerland) Jennifer Vicha

Danielsson (Westerlind, Grillfors) (PP) – 21:03	1–0
Mattsson (Lindström) – 27:20	2–0
Hesselvall (Österman, Ytfeldt) (PP) – 30:06	3–0
Johannesson (Andersson, Danielsson) – 41:52	4–0
	4–1	41:58 – Huwyler

4 min
Penalties
6 min
29
Shots
18

9 January 2025; 13:30	United States	9–1 (2–1, 2–0, 5–0)	Slovakia	Tikkurila Arena, Vantaa; Attendance: 263

Morgan Stickney
Goalies
Marianna Sumegová
Zuzana Tomečková
Referees:
(United Kingdom) Hollie Neenan
(Switzerland) Karin Williner
Linesmen:
(Switzerland) Anina Schüpbach
(United States) Abigail Torres

Box (Doyle) – 00:09	1–0
	1–1	03:01 – Tóthová (Lopušanová) (PP)
Doyle (Derrenbacher, Healy) (PP) – 07:33	2–1
Amelkovich (Dunn, Fanale) – 22:07	3–1
Doyle (Derrenbacher, Healy) (PP) – 29:09	4–1
Hartmetz (Daley, Amelkovich) (PP) – 46:04	5–1
Box (Biotti, Taylor) – 47:44	6–1
Lovell (Daley, Taylor) – 51:51	7–1
Fanale (Stickney) (SH) – 57:52	8–1
Derrenbacher (Box) – 59:36	9–1

12 min
Penalties
10 min
49
Shots
14

9 January 2025; 17:00	Czechia	6–0 (1–0, 2–0, 3–0)	Finland	Tikkurila Arena, Vantaa; Attendance: 802

Daniela Nováková
Goalies
Kerttu Kuja-Halkola
Referees:
(Sweden) Sabina Küller
(Italy) Anneke Orlandini
Linesmen:
(Sweden) Otillia Classon
(Norway) Maren Frøhaug

Fromová (Jebousková, Felcmanová) – 04:59	1–0
Felcmanová (Březinová, Fromová) (PP2) – 20:18	2–0
Vocetková (Hujová) – 30:02	3–0
Jílková (Paroubková, Jarabková) (SH) – 45:13	4–0
Kantorová (Tischler, Pánková) (SH) – 46:44	5–0
Březinová (Jílková, Jarabková) – 54:37	6–0

6 min
Penalties
4 min
30
Shots
18

9 January 2025; 20:30	Canada	17–0 (7–0, 7–0, 3–0)	Japan	Tikkurila Arena, Vantaa; Attendance: 227

Amelia Wilkinson
Goalies
Haruka Kuromaru
Rio Suzuki
Referees:
(Germany) Vanessa Anselm
(Sweden) Anna Hammar
Linesmen:
(United States) Brooke Branson
(Hungary) Zóra Gottlibet

Primerano (Cimoroni) – 03:31	1–0
Tiller (Zablocki, Primerano) – 04:05	2–0
S. Manness (Maynard, Primerano) – 05:56	3–0
Tiller (Copetti, Sawyer) (PP) – 09:39	4–0
Zablocki (Tiller, Tremblay) – 10:59	5–0
Primerano (Wood, Copetti) – 16:02	6–0
Ismael (Wood, Sawyer) – 18:54	7–0
Sawyer (Tiller, Ismael) (PP) – 21:07	8–0
Zablocki (Cimoroni, McDonald) (PP) – 23:10	9–0
McCullough (Ismael, Therien) – 28:54	10–0
Leprohon (Wood, Sorokan) – 29:46	11–0
Cimoroni (S. Manness, Maynard) – 31:19	12–0
Cimoroni (Therien, S. Manness) – 35:32	13–0
Piggott (McCullough, Bertelsen) – 35:52	14–0
Zablocki (Tiller, Viel) – 41:22	15–0
Cimoroni (S. Manness, McDonald) – 48:03	16–0
McDonald (Primerano, Zablocki) (PP) – 57:08	17–0

2 min
Penalties
8 min
76
Shots
4

==== Semifinals ====
11 January 2025; 15:00	United States	2–1 (0–0, 2–1, 0–0)	Sweden	Tikkurila Arena, Vantaa; Attendance: 523

Morgan Stickney
Goalies
Maja Helge
Referees:
(United States) Sydney Harris
(Canada) Amy Martin
Linesmen:
(Sweden) Ottilia Classon
(Canada) Stepahnie Gagnon

Fanale (Derrenbacher, Healy) (PP) – 21:56	1–0
	1–1	27:27 – Engström (Grillfors, Westerlind) (PP)
Fanale (Cerruti, Daley) – 34:13	2–1

10 min
Penalties
4 min
35
Shots
18

11 January 2025; 18:30	Canada	4–2 (0–1, 3–1, 1–0)	Czechia	Tikkurila Arena, Vantaa; Attendance: 507

Marilou Grenier
Goalies
Daniela Nováková
Referees:
(Sweden) Sabina Küller
(Italy) Anneke Orlandini
Linesmen:
(United States) Brooke Branson
(Norway) Maren Frøhaug

	0–1	12:34 – Vocetková (Jarabková, Šindelářová)
Ismael (Viel, Sawyer) (PP) – 25:26	1–1
Zablocki (McCullough, Tiller) – 30:12	2–1
Tiller (Zablocki, Primerano) – 38:05	3–1
	3–2	39:26 – Jebousková (Pánková, Gildainová)
McDonald (S. Manness. Primerano) (PP) – 52:07	4–2

8 min
Penalties
10 min
47
Shots
21

==== Relegation game ====
11 January 2025; 11:30	Japan	1–5 (0–1, 0–3, 1–1)	Slovakia	Tikkurila Arena, Vantaa; Attendance: 206

Haruka Kuromaru
Goalies
Marianna Sumegová
Referees:
(Sweden) Anna Hammar
(Switzerland) Karin Williner
Linesmen:
(Germany) Lara Fischer
(United States) Abigail Torres

	0–1	08:30 – Tomaštíková (Letaši, Lopušanová)
	0–2	29:47 – Kostková (Masláková, Tóthová) (EA)
	0–3	37:01 – Lopušanová (Tóthová)
	0–4	39:01 – Karkošková (Sibertová)
Okamura (Yamaguchi, Ruike) (PP) – 53:03	1–4
	1–5	58:32 – Lačná (EN)

4 min
Penalties
8 min
33
Shots
25

==== Bronze medal game ====
12 January 2025; 15:00	Czechia	2–1 (0–0, 0–1, 2–0)	Sweden	Tikkurila Arena, Vantaa; Attendance: 512

Daniela Nováková
Goalies
Maja Helge
Referees:
(Sweden) Sabina Küller
(Italy) Anneke Orlandini
Linesmen:
(Sweden) Ottilia Classon
(United States) Abigail Torres

	0–1	28:08 – Grillfors (Danielsson, Westerlind) (PP)
Hujová (Felcmanová, Vocetková) (PP) – 47:50	1–1
Vocetková (Tischler, Šindelářová) – 53:42	2–1

14 min
Penalties
6 min
33
Shots
37

==== Gold medal game ====
12 January 2025; 19:00	United States	0–3 (0–0, 0–1, 0–2)	Canada	Tikkurila Arena, Vantaa; Attendance: 1,032

Morgan Stickney
Goalies
Marilou Grenier
Referees:
(United States) Sydney Harris
(Canada) Amy Martin
Linesmen:
(United States) Brooke Branson
(Canada) Stephane Gagnon

0–1	28:06 – Tiller (Maynard, Sawyer) (PP)
0–2	49:13 – Copetti (Therien, Sawyer)
0–3	58:23 – Zablocki (EN)

2 min
Penalties
2 min
14
Shots
30

=== Awards and statistics ===
==== Awards ====
Best players selected by the Directorate

Position	Player
Goaltender	(Czech Republic) Daniela Nováková
Defender	(Canada) Chloe Primerano
Forward	(United States) Anabella Fanale

Source:IIHF.com

All-Star team

Position	Player
Goaltender	(United States) Morgan Stickney
Defender	(Canada) Chloe Primerano
Defender	(United States) Megan Healy
Forward	(Slovakia) Nela Lopušanová
Forward	(Canada) Stryker Zablocki
Forward	(United States) Anabella Fanale
MVP	(Slovakia) Nela Lopušanová

==== Scoring leaders ====
List shows the top skaters sorted by points, then goals.

Rank	Player	GP	G	A	Pts	+/−	PIM	POS
1	(Canada) Stryker Zablocki	6	8	4	12	+9	8	F
2	(Slovakia) Nela Lopušanová	5	5	6	11	0	2	F
3	(Canada) Caileigh Tiller	5	4	6	10	+9	0	F
4	(Canada) Maxine Cimoroni	6	4	6	10	+9	10	F
4	(Canada) Chloe Primerano	6	4	6	10	+10	0	D
6	(United States) Anabella Fanale	6	5	4	9	+5	4	F
7	(Canada) Sara Manness	6	2	7	9	+9	0	F
8	(United States) Mary Derrenbacher	6	2	6	8	+5	4	F
8	(Canada) Sydney Sawyer	6	2	6	8	+8	4	D
10	(Czech Republic) Linda Vocetková	6	5	2	7	+1	4	F

GP = Games played; G = Goals; A = Assists; Pts = Points; +/− = Plus/minus; PIM = Penalties in minutes; POS = Position
Source: IIHF

==== Leading goaltenders ====
Only the top five goaltenders, based on save percentage, who have played at least 40% of their team's minutes, are included in this list.

Rank	Player	TOI	GA	GAA	SA	Sv%	SO
1	(United States) Morgan Stickney	359:52	4	0.67	93	95.70	3
2	(Sweden) Maja Helge	296:44	8	1.62	133	93.98	0
3	(Canada) Marilou Grenier	240:00	4	1.00	62	93.55	2
4	(Czech Republic) Daniela Nováková	358:23	14	2.34	195	92.82	1
5	(Switzerland) Amaya Iseli	240:46	14	3.49	152	90.79	0

TOI = Time on ice (minutes:seconds); SA = Shots against; GA = Goals against; GAA = Goals against average; Sv% = Save percentage; SO = Shutouts
Source: IIHF

=== Final standings ===
Pos	Grp	Team	Pld	W	OTW	OTL	L	GF	GA	GD	Pts	Final Result
1	B	Canada	6	6	0	0	0	40	5	+35	18	Champions
2	A	United States	6	5	0	0	1	25	5	+20	15	Runners-up
3	B	Czechia	6	3	1	0	2	18	14	+4	11	Third place
4	A	Sweden	6	1	2	0	3	13	13	0	7	Fourth place
5	B	Switzerland	4	1	0	1	2	8	14	−6	4	Fifth place
6	A	Finland (H)	4	1	0	1	2	5	15	−10	4	Sixth place
7	B	Slovakia	5	1	0	0	4	14	27	−13	3	Avoided relegation
8	A	Japan	5	0	0	1	4	7	37	−30	1	Relegated to the Division I A

Source: IIHF
(H) Host

== Division I ==
=== Group A ===
The tournament was held in Budapest, Hungary, from 5 to 11 January 2025.

Pos	Team	Pld	W	OTW	OTL	L	GF	GA	GD	Pts	Promotion or relegation
1	Hungary (H)	5	5	0	0	0	13	2	+11	15	Promoted to the 2026 Top Division
2	Italy	5	4	0	0	1	12	9	+3	12	
3	Germany	5	2	0	0	3	12	12	0	6	
4	Norway	5	1	1	0	3	12	15	−3	5	
5	France	5	1	0	1	3	10	16	−6	4	
6	Austria	5	0	1	1	3	9	14	−5	3	Relegated to the 2026 Division I B

Source: IIHF
Rules for classification: 1) points; 2) head-to-head points; 3) head-to-head goal difference; 4) head-to-head number of goals scored; 5) result against closest best-ranked team outside tied teams; 6) result against second-best ranked team outside tied teams; 7) seeding before tournament.
(H) Host

=== Group B ===
The tournament was held in Katowice, Poland from 7 to 13 January 2025.

Pos	Team	Pld	W	OTW	OTL	L	GF	GA	GD	Pts	Promotion or relegation
1	Denmark	5	5	0	0	0	27	2	+25	15	Promoted to the 2026 Division I A
2	Poland (H)	5	4	0	0	1	19	12	+7	12	
3	Spain	5	2	1	0	2	12	15	−3	8	
4	China	5	2	0	1	2	15	11	+4	7	
5	Australia	5	0	1	0	4	6	21	−15	2	
6	South Korea	5	0	0	1	4	5	23	−18	1	Relegated to the 2026 Division II A

Source: IIHF
Rules for classification: 1) points; 2) head-to-head points; 3) head-to-head goal difference; 4) head-to-head number of goals scored; 5) result against closest best-ranked team outside tied teams; 6) result against second-best ranked team outside tied teams; 7) seeding before tournament.
(H) Host

== Division II ==
=== Group A ===
The tournament was held in Riga, Latvia from 20 to 26 January 2025.

Pos	Team	Pld	W	OTW	OTL	L	GF	GA	GD	Pts	Promotion or relegation
1	Great Britain	5	5	0	0	0	35	6	+29	15	Promoted to the 2026 Division I B
2	Kazakhstan	5	4	0	0	1	39	10	+29	12	
3	Latvia (H)	5	3	0	0	2	33	12	+21	9	
4	Netherlands	5	2	0	0	3	5	21	−16	6	
5	New Zealand	5	1	0	0	4	8	43	−35	3	
6	Chinese Taipei	5	0	0	0	5	8	36	−28	0	Relegated to the 2026 Division II B

Source: IIHF
Rules for classification: 1) points; 2) head-to-head points; 3) head-to-head goal difference; 4) head-to-head number of goals scored; 5) result against closest best-ranked team outside tied teams; 6) result against second-best ranked team outside tied teams; 7) seeding before tournament.
(H) Host

=== Group B ===
The tournament was held in Istanbul, Turkey from 18 to 23 January 2025.

Pos	Team	Pld	W	OTW	OTL	L	GF	GA	GD	Pts	Promotion
1	Turkey (H)	4	4	0	0	0	20	1	+19	12	Promoted to the 2026 Division II A
2	Iceland	4	3	0	0	1	29	3	+26	9	
3	Belgium	4	1	1	0	2	13	13	0	5	
4	Mexico	4	1	0	1	2	8	9	−1	4	
5	South Africa	4	0	0	0	4	1	45	−44	0	

Source: IIHF
Rules for classification: 1) points; 2) head-to-head points; 3) head-to-head goal difference; 4) head-to-head number of goals scored; 5) result against closest best-ranked team outside tied teams; 6) result against second-best ranked team outside tied teams; 7) seeding before tournament.
(H) Host

== Division III ==
The tournament was held in Zagreb, Croatia from 23 to 26 January 2025.

Pos	Team	Pld	W	OTW	OTL	L	GF	GA	GD	Pts	Promotion
1	Romania	3	2	1	0	0	17	8	+9	8	Promoted to the 2026 Division II B
2	Thailand	3	1	0	1	1	8	8	0	4	
3	Croatia (H)	3	1	0	0	2	7	9	−2	3	
4	Lithuania	3	1	0	0	2	7	14	−7	3	

Source: IIHF
Rules for classification: 1) points; 2) head-to-head points; 3) head-to-head goal difference; 4) head-to-head number of goals scored; 5) result against closest best-ranked team outside tied teams; 6) result against second-best ranked team outside tied teams; 7) seeding before tournament.
(H) Host
