= Stryker Zablocki =

Canadian ice hockey player (born 2007)

- Born: January 17, 2007 (age 19) Prince Albert, Saskatchewan, Canada
- Height: 5 ft 6 in (168 cm)
- Weight: 126 lb (57 kg; 9 st 0 lb)
- Position: Forward
- Shoots: Left
- NCAA team: Northeastern
Medal record
Women's athletics
Representing Canada
NACAC U18 Championships
| Gold medal – first place | 2023 San Jose | 4×400 m relay |

Stryker Zablocki (born January 17, 2007) is a Canadian college ice hockey player for Northeastern. She is also a track and field sprinter.

== Early life ==
Zablocki was born to Heather and Jay Zablocki. Her older brother, Storm, is a track athlete at the University of Regina, while her younger sister, Steele, is also an ice hockey player.

She represented Canada at the 2023 NACAC U18 Championships and won a gold medal in the 4×400 metres relay.

== Playing career ==
During the 2022–23 season with the Regina Rebels of the SFU18AAAHL, Zablocki led all rookies in scoring with 25 goals and 15 assists in 30 regular season games. She also recorded seven goals and four assists in eight playoff games. Following an outstanding season she was awarded the Dana Antal Award as rookie of the year.

During the 2023–24 season, she recorded 40 goals and 25 assists in 27 games and helped lead the Rebels to the 2024 Esso Cup. She scored the game-winning goal during the gold medal game. She led the tournament in scoring with ten points in six games and was named tournament MVP.

In September 2023, she committed to play college ice hockey at Northeastern. During the 2025–26 season, in her freshman year, she recorded 17 goals and 17 assists in 24 conference games. She became the first rookie to claim the Hockey East scoring title since the 2017–18 season. Following an outstanding season she was named to the Hockey East All-Rookie Team.

== International play ==
Medal record

Representing Canada

World U18 Championship
| Gold medal – first place | 2025 Finland | |
| Bronze medal – third place | 2024 Switzerland | |

Zablocki represented Canada at the 2024 IIHF World Women's U18 Championship where she recorded two goals and five assists in six games and won a bronze medal. She again represented Canada at the 2025 IIHF World Women's U18 Championship, where she led the tournament in scoring with eight goals and four assists in six games and won a gold medal. On January 9, 2025, during a quarterfinals game against Japan she recorded a hat-trick. Following the tournament she was named to the Media All-Star Team.

== Career statistics ==
=== Regular season and playoffs ===
| | | | Regular season | | | | | Playoffs |
| Season | Team | League | GP | G | A | Pts | PIM | GP | G | A | Pts | PIM |
|---|---|---|---|---|---|---|---|---|---|---|---|---|
| 2022–23 | Regina Rebels | SFU18AAAHL | 30 | 25 | 15 | 40 | 20 | 8 | 7 | 4 | 11 | 2 |
| 2023–24 | Regina Rebels | SFU18AAAHL | 27 | 40 | 25 | 65 | 32 | 4 | 7 | 6 | 13 | 4 |
| SFU18AAAHL totals | | | 57 | 65 | 40 | 105 | 52 | 12 | 14 | 10 | 24 | 6 |

=== International ===
| Year | Team | Event | Result | GP | G | A | Pts | PIM |
|---|---|---|---|---|---|---|---|---|
| 2024 | Canada | U18 | 3rd place, bronze medalist(s) | 6 | 2 | 5 | 7 | 4 |
| 2025 | Canada | U18 | 1st place, gold medalist(s) | 6 | 8 | 4 | 12 | 8 |
| Junior totals | | | | 12 | 10 | 9 | 19 | 12 |
