= Ice hockey at the 2023 European Youth Olympic Winter Festival =

- Location: Italy; Austria
- Date: 22–27 January 2023

Champions
- Men: Switzerland (1)
- Women: Czech Republic (2)

Ice hockey at the 2023 European Youth Olympic Winter Festival comprised two ice hockey tournaments – a boys' under-17 tournament and a girls' under-16 tournament – during the Friuli-Venezia Giulia 2023 edition of the European Youth Olympic Festival (EYOF). Both tournaments were held during 22 to 27 January 2023. The boys' tournament was played in the Friuli-Venezia Giulia region of Italy at the Fiera di Udine in Udine and the girls' tournament was played at the Eissportarena in Spittal an der Drau, Austria, the only event of the festival to be held in Austria.

== Medal summary ==
=== Medal table ===
* Host nation (Italy)

Rank	Nation	Gold	Silver	Bronze	Total
1	Czech Republic	1	0	0	1
1	Switzerland	1	0	0	1
3	Latvia	0	1	0	1
3	Slovakia	0	1	0	1
5	Finland	0	0	2	2
Totals (5 entries)		2	2	2	6

=== Medalists ===
Event	Gold	Silver	Bronze
Boys	Switzerland; Robin Antenen; Niklas Blessing; David Bosson; Nolan Cattin; Jordan Forget; Mischa Geisser; Joel Grossniklaus; Christian Kirsch; Joel Kurt; Kimi Körbler; Gian Meier; Leon Muggli; Elijah Neuenschwander; Yannik Ponzetto; Jamiro Reber; Basile Sansonnens; Noé Tarchini; Daniil Ustinkov; Nils Wehrli; Loris Wey	Latvia; Kristers Ansons; Sandis Auziņš; Edvīns Bērziņš; Oskars Briedis; Harijs Cjunskis; Dmitrijs Diļevka; Edvards Eglītis; Oskars Gusevs; Maksims Haritoncevs; Artūrs Kohs; Antons Macijevskis; Bruno Petrovičs; Roberts Jānis Polis; Krists Retenais; Markuss Sieradzkis; Alekss Simanovičs; Toms Trockis; Mikus Vecvanags; Aleksandrs Zaprivoda; Lindars Zemņickis	Finland; Onni Amhamdi; Matvey Butkovski; Vertti Haikala; Aatu Heinänen; Tuukka Heiskanen; Joakim Hirschovits; Jonatan Hirschovits; Robin Huttunen; Atte Vikla Jokerit; Aatu Karvinen; Veeti Louhivaara; Veikka Mononen; Aatu Myllykangas; Toni Nyman; Heikki Peipinen; Benjamin Pietilä; Kasper Pikkarainen; Roope Rajala; Leo Tuuva; Viljami Vuorinen
Girls	Czech Republic; Madlen Chladová; Magdaléna Felcmanová; Katerina Fialová; Adéla Formová; Tereza Gildainová; Veronika Hujová; Julie Jebousková; Viktorie Jílková; Natálie Musilová; Daniela Nováková; Veronika Ortová; Hana Panešová; Adéla Pánková; Aneta Paroubková; Klaudie Pietraszová; Barbora Prošková; Vera Stastkova; Šarlota Stýblová; Johanna Tischler; Linda Vocetková	Slovakia; Vanessa Eibenová; Michaela Feníková; Alica Juríková; Lenka Karkošková; Nikola Komloš; Tatiana Korčeková; Bianka Kostková; Nikita Krištofíková; Ema Lacková; Nela Lopušanová; Bianka Masláková; Lívia Nogová; Zuzana Sliacka; Mariana Sumegová; Alexandra Tomasová; Liana Tomaštíková; Zuzana Tomečková; Ema Tóthová; Laura Turňová; Jazmína Večerková	Finland; Nelly Andersson; Anastasia Borodina; Abigail Byskata; Leni Lilia Granroth; Ella-Sofia Hautala; Sara Holopainen; Iiris Hämäläinen; Laura Kivelä; Julia Kuhta; Kerttu Kuja-Halkola; Eva Lamberg; Annika Marjatsalo; Vilma Nurmisto; Emilia Piekkari; Elli Pohjanaho; Noora Puhto; Enni Riikonen; Riia Saarnii; Senja Siivonen; Jannika Sten

== Boys' tournament ==
2023 European Youth Olympic Winter Festival – Boys' ice hockey tournament
Tournament details
- Host country: Italy
- Venue: 1 (in 1 host city)
- Dates: 22–27 January 2023
- Teams: 6

Final positions
- Champions: Switzerland (1st title)
- Runners-up: Latvia
- Third place: Finland
- Fourth place: Germany

Tournament statistics
- Games played: 11
- Goals scored: 86 (7.82 per game)
- Scoring leader: Joel Grossniklaus (SUI) (8 points)

Awards
- MVP: Daniil Ustinkov (SUI)

The boys' ice hockey tournament at the 2023 European Youth Olympic Winter Festival was held at the Fiera di Udine in the Parco del Cormòr of Udine, Italy during 22 to 27 January 2023. It was the fourteenth boys' ice hockey tournament to be played as part of a European Youth Olympic Winter Festival, since the sport's introduction to the programme at the 1997 European Youth Olympic Winter Days.

Only players born in either 2006 or 2007 were eligible to compete in the tournament and, therefore, all players were 15 or 16 years old at the start of the tournament.

Switzerland went undefeated to claim their first EYOF ice hockey gold medal. First-time tournament medalists Latvia won silver and Finland rounded out the medal table with bronze. Germany, Slovakia, and tournament host Italy placed fourth, fifth, and sixth, respectively.

The Swiss team featured the top seven point scorers of the tournament: scoring leader Joel Grossniklaus, who scored 2 goals and 6 assists for 8 points; followed by Yannik Ponzetto and Loris Wey, who both tallied 7 points on 2 goals and 5 assists; Daniil Ustinkov, the tournament's top scoring defenseman, and Jordan Forget, who both notched a goal and 5 assists; David Bosson, who scored 4 goals and 1 assist; and Jamiro Reber, who recorded 3 goals and 2 assists. Reber tied with German Simon Seidl and Finn Aatu Karvinen for seventh on the points table, followed by Finland's Matvey Butkovskiy at tenth with 2 goals and 3 assists.

The leading scorers of those teams not represented in the top-ten of the points table were: Matthias Pardatscher (1+1) and Gianmarco Fraschetta (1+1) for Italy, Oskars Nils Briedis (0+5) for Latvia, and Pavol Prokopovič (1+4) for Slovakia.

=== Preliminary round ===
==== Group A ====
Pos	Team	Pld	W	OTW	OTL	L	GF	GA	GD	Pts	Qualification
1	Germany	2	1	1	0	0	12	9	+3	5	Semifinals
2	Finland	2	1	0	1	0	8	7	+1	4	Semifinals
3	Slovakia	2	0	0	0	2	7	11	−4	0	Fifth place game

Source: EYOF 2023

==== Group B ====
Pos	Team	Pld	W	OTW	OTL	L	GF	GA	GD	Pts	Qualification
1	Switzerland	2	2	0	0	0	12	1	+11	6	Semifinals
2	Latvia	2	1	0	0	1	8	6	+2	3	Semifinals
3	Italy (H)	2	0	0	0	2	1	14	−13	0	Fifth place game

Source: EYOF 2023
(H) Host

=== Play-off round ===
Semifinals
25 January
A1 Germany	2
B2 Latvia	3
25 January
B1 Switzerland	8
A2 Finland	3

Final
27 January
Latvia	0
Switzerland	5
Third place
26 January
4 Germany	1
Finland	4

Source: EYOF 2023

==== Semifinals ====
25 January 2023; 15:30	Germany	2–3 (0–0, 0–0, 2–3)	Latvia	Fiera di Udine, Udine

Game reference
8 min	Penalties	12 min
31	Shots	35

25 January 2023; 19:30	Switzerland	8–3 (3–0, 2–1, 3–2)	Finland	Fiera di Udine, Udine

Game reference
8 min	Penalties	8 min
26	Shots	21

==== Fifth place game ====
26 January 2023; 15:30	Slovakia	8–4 (3–1, 3–1, 2–2)	Italy	Fiera di Udine, Udine

Game reference
6 min	Penalties	6 min
46	Shots	26

==== Bronze medal game ====
26 January 2023; 19:30	Germany	1–4 (0–1, 1–2, 0–1)	Finland	Fiera di Udine, Udine

Game reference
14 min	Penalties	10 min
24	Shots	25

==== Gold medal game ====
27 January 2023; 20:00	Latvia	0–5 (0–1, 0–1, 0–3)	Switzerland	Fiera di Udine, Udine

Game reference
18 min	Penalties	18 min
16	Shots	29

=== Awards ===
Best players selected by the Directorate

Position	Player
Goaltender	Elijah Neuenschwander (SUI)
Defenceman	Leon Muggli (SUI)
Forward	Joel Grossniklaus (SUI)
MVP	Daniil Ustinkov (SUI)

Source: EYOF 2023

== Girls' tournament ==
2023 European Youth Olympic Winter Festival – Girls' ice hockey tournament
Tournament details
- Host country: Austria
- Venue: 1 (in 1 host city)
- Dates: 22–27 January 2023
- Teams: 8

Final positions
- Champions: Czech Republic (2nd title)
- Runners-up: Slovakia
- Third place: Finland
- Fourth place: Sweden

Tournament statistics
- Games played: 16
- Goals scored: 95 (5.94 per game)
- Scoring leader: (Slovakia) Nela Lopušanová (12 points)

The girls' ice hockey tournament at the 2023 European Youth Olympic Winter Festival was held at the Eissportarena in Spittal an der Drau, Austria during 22 to 27 January 2023. It was the second girls' ice hockey tournament to be played as part of a European Youth Olympic Winter Festival, following the inaugural tournament at Vuokatti 2022.

Only players born in either 2007 or 2008 were eligible to compete in the tournament and, therefore, all players were 14 or 15 years old at the start of the tournament.

Slovakia placed first in Group A after losing only one game in the preliminary round, a 3–4 loss to Switzerland. The Czech Republic, defending gold medalists from 2022, were unbeaten in the preliminary round and topped the Group B standings to earn placement in their second consecutive gold medal game. The dominance of the Czech team continued as they outscored Slovakia 4–1 to remain the only team to have won EYOF gold in girls' ice hockey. Slovakia claimed their first EYOF girls' ice hockey medal with silver.

Finland narrowly missed placing first in Group A after amassing a win-loss record, goal differential, and points total identical to that of Slovakia but, because their one loss came against Slovakia, were held to second place and progressed to their second consecutive bronze medal game. In the preliminary round rematch between the 2022 gold medal match teams, Sweden onceagain pushed the Czech Republic to overtime before ultimately losing in the shootout. With the overtime loss as the only blemish on their record, Sweden finished second in Group B. Continuing in dramatic fashion, Sweden tied the score against Finland in the last five minutes of regulation to push the bronze medal game to overtime. After a scoreless overtime period, Abigail Byskata scored the lone goal of the shootout to solidify Finland's second consecutive bronze medal victory.

Austria and Italy both made their EYOF girls' ice hockey debuts in 2023, making the fifth place game a matchup between two tournament newcomers. Italy's Federica Boaglio scored the only goal of the game, as Anna Corte Sualon earned a 42-shot shutout to capture a fifth place finish for the host nation.

Switzerland beat Germany 3–2 to claim seventh place.

=== Preliminary round ===
==== Group A ====
Standings

Pos	Team	Pld	W	OTW	OTL	L	GF	GA	GD	Pts	Qualification
1	Slovakia	3	2	0	0	1	12	10	+2	6 (Note: Finland 2–4 Slovakia)	Gold medal game
2	Finland	3	2	0	0	1	9	4	+5	6	Bronze medal game
3	Austria (H)	3	1	0	0	2	7	10	−3	3 (Note: Switzerland 0–3 Austria)	Fifth place game
4	Switzerland	3	1	0	0	2	4	8	−4	3	Seventh place game

Source: EYOF 2023
(H) Host
Notes:

Results

22 January 2023; 12:00	Austria	0–5 (0–2, 0–3, 0–0)	Finland	Eissportarena, Spittal an der Drau

Game reference

Leonie Eder
Kiara Matt
Goalies
Emilia Piekkari
Referee:
Ulrike Winklmayr
Linesmen:
Anita Fobian
Wolfgang Puff

0–1	07:47 – Sten (Lamberg) (SH1)
0–2	19:48 – Kuhta (Byskata)
0–3	33:00 – Pohjanaho (Sten)
0–4	36:39 – Sten (Lamberg)
0–5	38:41 – Hautala (Lamberg)

18 min
Penalties
115 min
30
Shots
28

22 January 2023; 16:00	Slovakia	3–4 (1–3, 0–0, 2–1)	Switzerland	Eissportarena, Spittal an der Drau

Game reference

Mariana Sumegová
Goalies
Lia Rubin
Amaya Iseli
Referee:
Stephan Orel
Linesmen:
Markus Samrock
Christoph Pirsch

Lopušanová (Korčeková, Tóthová) – 02:31	1–0
	1–1	16:32 – Mériguet (Näf, Dalessi)
	1–2	16:45 – Lovecchio (Manetsch, Langenegger)
	1–3	19:42 – Müller (Dalessi, Leibundgut)
	1–4	44:40 – Vuillemin (Leibundgut, Müller) (PP1)
Tóthová (Lopušanová, Lacková) – 47:44	2–4
Karkošková (Eibenová) – 54:20	3–4

6 min
Penalties
4 min
31
Shots
20

23 January 2023; 16:00	Finland	2–0 (2–0, 0–0, 0–0)	Switzerland	Eissportarena, Spittal an der Drau

Game reference
Kerttu Kuja-Halkola	Goalies	Lia Rubin	Referee: Stephan Orel; Linesmen: Anja Klemm; Wolfgang Puff
Lamberg (Sten) – 04:27 / 1–0; Andersson (Borodina) – 08:53 / 2–0			Referee: Stephan Orel; Linesmen: Anja Klemm; Wolfgang Puff
12 min	Penalties	4 min	Referee: Stephan Orel; Linesmen: Anja Klemm; Wolfgang Puff
16	Shots	33	Referee: Stephan Orel; Linesmen: Anja Klemm; Wolfgang Puff

23 January 2023; 20:00	Slovakia	5–4 (2–1, 3–2, 0–1)	Austria	Eissportarena, Spittal an der Drau

Game reference

Zuzana Tomečková
Goalies
Kiara Matt
Referee:
Julia Kainberger
Linesmen:
Daniel Kazianka
Markus Samrock

Lopušanová (Nogová, Tomaštíková) (PP1) – 03:11	1–0
	1–1	12:15 – Ostadal (Brunner, Kleinlercher) (SH1)
Lopušanová (Feníková, Tomaštíková) – 19:40	2–1
Lacková (Lopušanová, Korčeková) (PP1) – 21:19	3–1
Lopušanová (Nogová, Tomaštíková) – 24:07	4–1
Tóthová (Lacková, Lopušanová) (PP1) – 26:08	5–1
	5–2	27:44 – Lintner (Brunner, Bäck)
	5–3	39:34 – Picka (Prosen, Ostadal)
	5–4	44:37 – Rumpl

6 min
Penalties
18 min
32
Shots
23

24 January 2023; 20:00	Finland	2–4 (0–1, 2–2, 0–1)	Slovakia	Eissportarena, Spittal an der Drau

Game reference

Kerttu Kuja-Halkola
Goalies
Mariana Sumegová
Referee:
Julia Kainberger
Linesmen:
Christoph Pirsch
Markus Samrock

	0–1	05:10 – Lopušanová (Tóthová, Lacková) (PP1)
Byskata (Puhto, Siivonen) – 22:23	1–1
	1–2	25:49 – Karkošková (Lopušanová, Lacková) (PP1)
Lamberg (Siivonen, Sten) – 29:06	2–2
	2–3	29:44 – Lacková (Tóthová, Lopušanová)
	2–4	53:13 – Lopušanová (Karkošková)

10 min
Penalties
8 min
29
Shots
40

25 January 2023; 12:00	Switzerland	0–3 (0–2, 0–1, 0–0)	Austria	Eissportarena, Spittal an der Drau

Game reference

Amaya Iseli
Lia Rubin
Goalies
Kiara Matt
Referee:
Ulrike Winklmayr
Linesmen:
Wolfgang Puff
Markus Samrock

0–1	08:46 – Unger (Lintner) (SH1)
0–2	13:22 – Brunner (Lintner) (SH1)
0–3	35:17 – Kleinlercher (Tekin)

6 min
Penalties
12 min
25
Shots
29

==== Group B ====
Standings

Pos	Team	Pld	W	OTW	OTL	L	GF	GA	GD	Pts	Qualification
1	Czech Republic	3	2	1	0	0	19	5	+14	8	Gold medal game
2	Sweden	3	2	0	1	0	15	5	+10	7	Bronze medal game
3	Italy	3	1	0	0	2	8	16	−8	3	Fifth place game
4	Germany	3	0	0	0	3	5	21	−16	0	Seventh place game

Source: EYOF 2023

Results

22 January 2023; 20:00	Sweden	2–3 GWS (0–0, 1–1, 1–1) (OT: 0–0) (SO: 0–1)	Czech Republic	Eissportarena, Spittal an der Drau

Game reference

Maja Helge
Goalies
Daniela Nováková
Referee:
Julia Kainberger
Linesmen:
Anja Klemm
Hanna Wacik

	0–1	20:12 – Jílková (Jebousková, Vocetková)
Arvidsson (Nederman, Norström) – 21:24	1–1
Sjöberg (Leacy, Nederman) – 57:24	2–1
	2–2	58:52 – Jebousková (Tischler, Jílková)

Danielsson (miss)
Åberg (miss)
Sjöberg (miss)
Arvidsson (miss)
Johannesson (miss)
Sjöberg (miss)
Shootout
(miss) Jebousková
(miss) Paroubková
(miss) Jílková
Vocetková
12 min
Penalties
10 min
28
Shots
45

23 January 2023; 12:00	Germany	3–5 (1–2, 1–2, 1–1)	Italy	Eissportarena, Spittal an der Drau

Game reference

Hannah Loist
Lilli Gania
Goalies
Emma Fortarel
Referee:
Ulrike Winklmayr
Linesmen:
Anita Fobian
Christoph Pirsch

	0–1	03:29 – Giuliani
Weichenhain (Wintgen) – 08:48	1–1
	1–2	11:20 – Fantin (Heidenberger)
	1–3	20:38 – Todesco (Heidenberger, Fantin)
Weichenhain (Thume) – 28:14	2–3
	2–4	32:48 – Gay (Giuliani)
Thume (Wintgen, Georgi) – 58:26	3–4
	3–5	59:29 – Heidenberger

4 min
Penalties
10 min
19
Shots
31

24 January 2023; 12:00	Czech Republic	9–1 (2–0, 3–1, 4–0)	Germany	Eissportarena, Spittal an der Drau

Game reference

Daniela Nováková
Goalies
Lilli Gania
Referee:
Ulrike Winklmayr
Linesmen:
Anita Fobian
Christoph Pirsch

Jílková (Fromová) (PP1) – 04:59	1–0
Jílková – 19:22	2–0
Vocetková – 20:13	3–0
Jebousková – 27:14	4–0
Jílková (Paroubková, Vocetková) – 30:24	5–0
	5–1	31:16 – Weichenhain (Seyrer)
Vocetková (Jílková) – 44:12	6–1
Vocetková (Jebousková) – 45:16	7–1
Felcmanová (Vocetková, Musilová) – 53:48	8–1
Jebousková (Vocetková) – 58:58	9–1

8 min
Penalties
6 min
53
Shots
13

24 January 2023; 16:00	Italy	1–6 (1–1, 0–2, 0–3)	Sweden	Eissportarena, Spittal an der Drau

Game reference

Referee:
Stephan Orel
Linesmen:
Anja Klemm
Wolfgang Puff

	0–1	06:12 – Leacy (Andersson, Georgny)
Todesco (Cambruzzi, Heidenberger) (PP1) – 11:08	1–1
	1–2	29:30 – Pallin (Andersson, Danielsson) (PP1)
	1–3	32:00 – Danielsson (Andersson)
	1–4	46:23 – Engström (Edsman, Näslund)
	1–5	47:51 – Pallin (Norström, Sjöberg)
	1–6	55:29 – Danielsson (Pallin, Norström) (PP1)

8 min
Penalties
16 min
28
Shots
33

25 January 2023; 16:00	Sweden	7–1 (1–0, 2–1, 4–1)	Germany	Eissportarena, Spittal an der Drau

Game reference

Ebba Ridderstolpe
Goalies
Hannah Loist
Lilli Gania
Referee:
Stephan Orel
Linesmen:
Anja Klemm
Anita Fobian

Danielsson (Pallin, Åberg) – 14:26	1–0
	1–1	22:38 – Pfalz (Thume)
Andersson (Sjöberg) (PP1) – 27:52	2–1
Danielsson (Sjöberg, Pallin) – 34:17	3–1
Danielsson (Mattsson, Åberg) – 42:50	4–1
Sjöberg (Norström, Pallin) – 47:18	5–1
Pallin (Åberg) (PP1) – 56:00	6–1
Arvidsson (Ridderstolpe) – 58:04	7–1

8 min
Penalties
6 min
50
Shots
17

25 January 2023; 20:00	Czech Republic	7–2 (3–1, 1–0, 3–1)	Italy	Eissportarena, Spittal an der Drau

Game reference

Daniela Nováková
Veronika Ortová
Goalies
Emma Fortarel
Referee:
Julia Kainberger
Linesmen:
Christoph Pirsch
Markus Samrock

Stýblová (Prošková, Fromová) (PP2) – 08:40	1–0
Felcmanová (Tischler, Musilová) (PP1) – 08:49	2–0
Musilová (Felcmanová, Šťástková) – 15:34	3–0
	3–1	19:50 – Bedont (Cambruzzi, Todesco)
Vocetková (Jílková, Panešová) – 30:39	4–1
Prošková (Stýblová, Fromová) (PP1) – 40:59	5–1
Pietraszová (Stýblová, Pánková) – 43:56	6–1
Jílková (Paroubková, Vocetková) – 50:13	7–1
	7–2	59:20 – Fantin (Heidenberger, Leger)

8 min
Penalties
16 min
37
Shots
25

=== Final round ===
==== Seventh place game ====
26 January 2023; 15:30	Switzerland	3–2 (1–1, 0–1, 2–0)	Germany	Eissportarena, Spittal an der Drau

Game reference

Lia Rubin
Amaya Iseli
Goalies
Hannah Loist
Referee:
Ulrike Winklmayr
Linesmen:
Markus Samrock
Anita Fobian

	0–1	11:28 – Seyrer (Mayr) (PP1)
Manetsch (SH1) – 18:23	1–1
	1–2	26:50 – Seyrer (Zielinski) (PP1)
Müller (PP1) – 42:53	2–2
Leibundgut (Lovecchio) – 50:24	3–2

12 min
Penalties
10 min
28
Shots
14

==== Fifth place game ====
26 January 2023; 19:30	Austria	0–1 (0–1, 0–0, 0–0)	Italy	Eissportarena, Spittal an der Drau

Game reference
Kiara Matt	Goalies	Anna Corte Sualon	Referee: Stephen Orel; Linesmen: Anja Klemm; Christoph Pirsch
0–1 / 14:01 – Boaglio			Referee: Stephen Orel; Linesmen: Anja Klemm; Christoph Pirsch
10 min	Penalties	8 min	Referee: Stephen Orel; Linesmen: Anja Klemm; Christoph Pirsch
31	Shots	42	Referee: Stephen Orel; Linesmen: Anja Klemm; Christoph Pirsch

==== Bronze medal game ====
27 January 2023; 12:30	Finland	3–2 GWS (1–0, 0–1, 1–1) (OT: 0–0) (SO: 1–0)	Sweden	Eissportarena, Spittal an der Drau

Game reference

Emilia Piekkari
Goalies
Maja Helge
Referee:
Ulrike Winklmayr
Linesmen:
Anita Fobian
Wolfgang Puff

Sten (Lamberg) – 05:18	1–0
	1–1	32:10 – Svensson (Johannesson) (PP1)
Byskata (Pohjanaho) (PP1) – 49:39	2–1
	2–2	55:51 – Pallin

Andersson (miss)
Sten (miss)
Byskata
Lamberg (miss)
Shootout
(miss) Johannesson
(miss) Danielsson
(miss) Georgny
(miss) Pallin
(miss) Engström
12 min
Penalties
12 min
27
Shots
49

==== Gold medal game ====
27 January 2023; 16:30	Slovakia	1–4 (0–0, 1–1, 0–3)	Czech Republic	Eissportarena, Spittal an der Drau

Game reference

Mariana Sumegová
Goalies
Daniela Nováková
Referees:
Julia Kainberger
Stephan Orel
Linesmen:
Anja Klemm
Markus Samrock

	0–1	25:07 – Vocetková (Fromová, Prošková) (SH1)
Juriková (Lopušanová, Kostková) – 31:17	1–1
	1–2	44:55 – Fromová (Paroubková, Pietraszová)
	1–3	52:34 – Gildainová (Šťástková, Fromová)
	1–4	54:02 – Hujová (Pietraszová, Jílková) (SH1)

16 min
Penalties
10 min
22
Shots
52

=== Final standings ===
Pos	Team	Pld	W	OTW	OTL	L	GF	GA	GD
1st place, gold medalist(s)	Czech Republic	4	3	1	0	0	23	6	+17
2nd place, silver medalist(s)	Slovakia	4	2	0	0	2	13	14	–1
3rd place, bronze medalist(s)	Finland	4	3	0	0	1	12	6	+6
4	Sweden	4	2	0	1	1	17	8	+9
5	Italy	4	2	0	0	2	9	16	–7
6	Austria (H)	4	1	0	0	3	7	11	–4
7	Switzerland	4	2	0	0	2	7	10	–3
8	Germany	4	0	0	0	4	7	24	–17

Source: EYOF 2023

=== Player statistics ===
==== Scoring leaders ====
Top-ten point scorers sorted by points, then goals.

Rank	Nat	Player	GP	G	A	Pts	PIM	+/−	POS
1	(Slovakia)	Nela Lopušanová	4	6	6	12	6	+3	F
2	(Czech Republic)	Linda Vocetková	4	6	5	11	0	+12	F
3	(Czech Republic)	Viktorie Jílková	4	5	4	9	4	+8	F
4	(Sweden)	Elsa Pallin	4	4	4	8	0	+5	F
5	(Sweden)	Edit Danielsson	4	5	1	6	4	+7	F
6	(Finland)	Jannika Sten	4	3	3	6	2	+6	F
7	(Slovakia)	Ema Lacková	4	2	4	6	2	±0	F
8	(Finland)	Eva Lamberg	4	2	4	6	10	+7	F
9	(Czech Republic)	Adéla Fromová	4	1	5	6	2	–1	D
10	(Czech Republic)	Julie Jebousková	4	3	2	5	4	+7	F

GP = Games played; G = Goals; A = Assists; Pts = Points; +/− = Plus/minus; PIM = Penalties in minutes; POS = Position
Source: EYOF 2023

==== Goaltenders ====
Goaltenders who played at least 40% of their team's minutes are included in this list, sorted by save percentage.

Nat	Player	TOI	SOG	GA	GAA	Sv%	SO
(Finland)	Kerttu Kuja-Halkola	120:0	73	4	2.00	94.52	1
(Austria)	Kiara Matt	198:2	107	6	1.81	94.39	1
(Czech Republic)	Daniela Nováková	179:3	59	4	1.34	93.22	0
(Sweden)	Maja Helge	161:4	100	7	2.60	93.00	0
(Italy)	Anna Corte Sualon	120:0	64	6	3.00	90.63	1
(Switzerland)	Lia Rubin	146:1	60	6	2.46	90.00	0
(Slovakia)	Mariana Sumegová	178:3	99	10	3.36	89.90	0
(Germany)	Hannah Loist	156:0	100	13	5.00	87.00	0
(Italy)	Emma Fortarel	120:0	56	10	5.00	82.14	0

TOI = Time on ice (minutes:seconds); SOG = Shots on goal; GA = Goals against; GAA = Goals against average; Sv% = Save percentage; SO = Shutouts
Source: EYOF 2023

=== Awards ===
Best players selected by the Directorate

Position	Player
Goaltender	(Finland) Kerttu Kuja-Halkola
Defenceman	(Czech Republic) Šarlota Stýblová
Forward	(Slovakia) Nela Lopušanová

Source: EYOF 2023

=== Rosters ===
Rank	Team	Roster
1	Czech Republic	Goaltenders: Kateřina Fialová, Daniela Nováková, Veronika Ortová; Defencemen: Adéla Fromová, Veronika Hujová, Hana Panešová, Aneta Paroubková, Šarlota Stýblová, Johanna Tischler; Forwards: Madlen Chladová, Magdaléna Felcmanová, Tereza Gildainová, Julie Jebousková (A), Viktorie Jílková (C), Natálie Musilová, Adéla Pánková, Klaudie Pietraszová, Barbora Prošková, Vĕra Šťástková, Linda Vocetková (A); Head coach: Jan Lucák; Assistant coaches: Martin Cimrman, Dalimil Svoboda (goaltender)
2	Slovakia	Goaltenders: Mariana Sumegová, Zuzana Tomečková; Defencemen: Vanessa Eibenová, Michaela Feníková, Bianka Kostková, Nikita Lilliana Krištofíková, Bianka Masláková, Lívia Nogová, Jazmína Večerková; Forwards: Alica Juríková, Lenka Karkošková (A), Nikola Komloš, Tatiana Korčeková, Ema Lacková (C), Nela Lopušanová (A), Zuzana Sliacka, Alexandra Tomasová, Liana Tomaštíková, Ema Tóthová, Laura Turnová; Head coach: Nicol Lucák Čupková; Assistant coaches: Juraj Ostrolucký, Adam Štěpanovský (goaltender)
3	Finland	Goaltenders: Kerttu Kuja-Halkola, Emilia Piekkari; Defencemen: Nelly Andersson, Sara Holopainen, Iiris Hämäläinen, Vilma Nurmisto, Elli Pohjanaho, Enni Riikonen, Riia Saarni (A); Forwards: Anastasia Borodina, Abigail Byskata (C), Leni Granroth, Ella-Sofia Hautala, Laura Kivelä, Julia Kuhta, Eva Lamberg (A), Annika Marjatsalo, Noora Puhto, Senja Siivonen, Jannika Sten; Head coach: Mika Väärälä; Assistant coaches: Marjo Voutilainen, Vesa Lehtonen, Severi Kinnunen (goaltender)
4	Sweden	Goaltenders: Maja Helge, Ebba Ridderstolpe; Defencemen: Meja Andersson, Wilma Georgny, Nelly Johansson, Lovisa Norström, Nellie Svensson (A), Elsa Åberg; Forwards: Evelina Arvidsson, Edit Danielsson (A), Tilda Edsman, Lovisa Engström, Moa Johannesson, Eimear Leacy (C), Linn Mattsson, Saga Nederman, Lionelle Näslund, Elsa Pallin, Stella Sjöberg, Ingrid Wikblom; Head coach: Ulf Hall; Assistant coaches: Linus Fagemo, Emil Karnatz (goaltender)
5	Italy	Goaltenders: Anna Corte Sualon, Emma Fortarel; Defencemen: Maddalena Bedont, Olivia Cambruzzi (A), Aurora De Fanti, Martina Gay, Ginevra Eloise Leger, Nicole Varesco; Forwards: Federica Boaglio, Olivia De Bertoli, Matilde Fantin (C), Annalisa Giuliani, Miriam Hackhofer, Manuela Heidenberger (A), Emily Innocenti, Carlotta Mellarè, Eleonora Pisetta, Nelly Schmid, Giorgia Todesco, Aurora Varesco; Head coach: Massimo Fedrizzi; Assistant coaches: Luca Giacomuzzi
6	Austria	Goaltenders: Leonie Eder, Kiara Matt; Defencemen: Elisa Brunner (A), Sofia Fleisch, Gloria Henek (A), Eva Kollegger, Hana Ostadal, Valentina Prosen, Ida Schlöglmann; Forwards: Britta Bachler, Malaya Bäck, Emma Kleinlercher, Emma Lintner, Pia Obermayr, Vanessa Picka, Alice Putscheck, Florentina Rumpl, Katharina Steiger, Artemis Tekin, Serena Unger (C); Head coach: Philipp Siutz; Assistant coaches: Alexandra Gürtler, Patrick Platzer, Gernot Wegerer (goaltender)
7	Switzerland	Goaltenders: Amaya Iseli, Lia Rubin; Defencemen: Miriana Bottoni, Melissa Capezzali, Sonja Inkamp, Ilana Leibundgut (A), Laure Mériguet, Lorena Wrann; Forwards: Luana Birnstiel, Mila Croll, Elisa Dalessi, Naemi Herzig (C), Rebecca Langenegger (A), Shaira Lovecchio, Jael Manetsch, Norina Müller, Julia Näf, Sarina Ochsner, Jelena Sonderegger, Aiyana Vuillemin; Head coach: Tatjana Diener; Assistant coaches: Iris Müller, Melanie Häfliger, Andreas Ellenberger (goaltender)
8	Germany	Goaltenders: Lilli Gania, Hannah Loist; Defencemen: Sarah Bouceka, Annica Busch, Lara Georgi (A), Scarlett Greb, Julie Ortner, Siena Müller Maldonado, Antonia Thume, Nele Zimmermann; Forwards: Felicitas Bergmann, Liv Betten, Viktoria del Toso, Sandra Mayr, Frederike Pfalz, Madalena Seidel, Anabel Seyrer (A), Hanna Weichenhain (C), Zoe Wintgen, Theresa Zielinski; Head coach: Jennifer Harß; Assistant coaches: Franziska Busch, Ronja Jenike

Source: EYOF 2023
