= Bella Fanale =

American ice hockey player (born 2007)

Anabella Fanale
- Born: May 19, 2007 (age 19) Webster, New York, U.S.
- Height: 5 ft 5 in (165 cm)
- Weight: 161 lb (73 kg; 11 st 7 lb)
- Position: Forward
- Shoots: Right
- WCHA team: Minnesota
- Playing career: 2025–present

Anabella Fanale (born May 19, 2007) is an American college ice hockey forward for the Minnesota Golden Gophers of the National Collegiate Athletic Association (NCAA).

== Playing career ==
On November 14, 2024, Fanale signed her Letter of Intent to play college ice hockey at Minnesota during the 2025–26 season. She began her collegiate career during the 2025–26 season. She made her collegiate debut on September 25, 2025, in a game against Boston College, and scored the team's opening goal of the season. She finished the game with two goals, for her first career multi-goal game. The next day she scored one goal and three assists and was named the WCHA Rookie of the Week. She finished September with three goals and three assist in two games and was named the WCHA Rookie of the Month. On January 10, 2026, Abbey Murphy produced a widely acclaimed assist against Minnesota State, batting a bouncing puck through a defender's legs at full speed before feeding Fanale for a goal. The play went viral across social media. During January, she recorded eight goals and sevens for 15 points. She posted two multi-goal games and four multi-point games, and was named WCHA Rookie of the Month for the second time in her career.

== International play ==
Medal record

Representing United States

Ice hockey

U18 World Championship
Gold medal – first place	2024 Switzerland	
Silver medal – second place	2025 Finland	
Bronze medal – third place	2023 Sweden	

Fanale made her international debut for the United States at the 2023 IIHF U18 Women's World Championship where she recorded one goal and one assist in five games and won a bronze medal. She again represented the United States at the 2024 IIHF U18 Women's World Championship where she recorded two assists in four games and won a gold medal.

On November 13, 2024, Fanale was selected to represent the United States at the 2025 IIHF U18 Women's World Championship. On January 1, 2025, she was named team captain. She led team USA in scoring with five goals and four assists in six games and won a gold medal. During the semifinals against Sweden, she scored both goals in a 2–1 victory to help the United States advance to the gold medal game. She was subsequently named to the media all-star team and was named best forward by the IIHF Directorate.

== Personal life ==
Fanale was born to Michele and Tony Fanale, and has two siblings, Mikayla and Maeliana. She has no pre game rituals, and her favorite postgame meal is protein shakes.

== Career statistics ==
=== International ===
Year	Team	Event	Result	GP	G	A	Pts	PIM
2023	United States	U18	3rd place, bronze medalist(s)	5	1	1	2	0
2024	United States	U18	1st place, gold medalist(s)	4	0	2	2	0
2025	United States	U18	2nd place, silver medalist(s)	6	5	4	9	4
Junior totals				15	6	7	13	4
