= 2026–27 NCAA Division I women's ice hockey season =

2026–27 NCAA women's ice hockey season
- NCAA tournament: 2027
- National championship: AMSOIL Arena; Duluth, Minnesota

The 2026–27 NCAA Division I women's ice hockey season will begin in September 2026 and end with the 2027 NCAA Division I women's ice hockey tournament's championship game at AMSOIL Arena in Duluth, Minnesota on March 23, 2027.

== Regular season ==
=== Standings ===
- 2026–27 Atlantic Hockey America standings
  	Conference							Overall					
  	GP	W	L	T	PTS	GF	GA	GP	W	L	T	GF	GA
  Delaware	0	0	0	0	0	0	0	0	0	0	0	0	0
  Lindenwood	0	0	0	0	0	0	0	0	0	0	0	0	0
  #15 Mercyhurst	0	0	0	0	0	0	0	0	0	0	0	0	0
  #4 Penn State	0	0	0	0	0	0	0	0	0	0	0	0	0
  RIT	0	0	0	0	0	0	0	0	0	0	0	0	0
  Robert Morris	0	0	0	0	0	0	0	0	0	0	0	0	0
  Syracuse	0	0	0	0	0	0	0	0	0	0	0	0	0
  Championship: March 6, 2027 † indicates conference regular season champion; * indicates conference tournament champion Rankings: USCHO.com; updated September 17, 2026
- 2026–27 ECAC Hockey standings
  	Conference							Overall					
  	GP	W	L	T	PTS	GF	GA	GP	W	L	T	GF	GA
  Brown	0	0	0	0	0	0	0	0	0	0	0	0	0
  #12 Clarkson	0	0	0	0	0	0	0	0	0	0	0	0	0
  #13 Colgate	0	0	0	0	0	0	0	0	0	0	0	0	0
  #11 Cornell	0	0	0	0	0	0	0	0	0	0	0	0	0
  Dartmouth	0	0	0	0	0	0	0	0	0	0	0	0	0
  Harvard	0	0	0	0	0	0	0	0	0	0	0	0	0
  #8 Princeton	0	0	0	0	0	0	0	0	0	0	0	0	0
  #6 Quinnipiac	0	0	0	0	0	0	0	0	0	0	0	0	0
  RPI	0	0	0	0	0	0	0	0	0	0	0	0	0
  St. Lawrence	0	0	0	0	0	0	0	0	0	0	0	0	0
  Union	0	0	0	0	0	0	0	0	0	0	0	0	0
  #10 Yale	0	0	0	0	0	0	0	0	0	0	0	0	0
  Championship: March 6, 2027 † indicates conference regular season champion; * indicates conference tournament champion Rankings: USCHO.com; updated September 17, 2026
- 2026–27 NEWHA standings
  	Conference							Overall					
  	GP	W	L	T	PTS	GF	GA	GP	W	L	T	GF	GA
  Assumption	0	0	0	0	0	0	0	0	0	0	0	0	0
  Franklin Pierce	0	0	0	0	0	0	0	0	0	0	0	0	0
  LIU	0	0	0	0	0	0	0	0	0	0	0	0	0
  Post	0	0	0	0	0	0	0	0	0	0	0	0	0
  Sacred Heart	0	0	0	0	0	0	0	0	0	0	0	0	0
  Saint Anselm	0	0	0	0	0	0	0	0	0	0	0	0	0
  Saint Michael's	0	0	0	0	0	0	0	0	0	0	0	0	0
  Stonehill	0	0	0	0	0	0	0	0	0	0	0	0	0
  Championship: March 6, 2027 † indicates conference regular season champion; * indicates conference tournament champion Rankings: USCHO.com
- 2026–27 Western Collegiate Hockey Association standings
  	Conference										Overall					
  	GP	W	L	T	OTW	OTL	SOW	PTS	GF	GA	GP	W	L	T	GF	GA
  Bemidji State	0	0	0	0	0	0	0	0	0	0	0	0	0	0	0	0
  #9 Minnesota Duluth	0	0	0	0	0	0	0	0	0	0	0	0	0	0	0	0
  #3 Minnesota	0	0	0	0	0	0	0	0	0	0	0	0	0	0	0	0
  #14 Minnesota State	0	0	0	0	0	0	0	0	0	0	0	0	0	0	0	0
  #2 Ohio State	0	0	0	0	0	0	0	0	0	0	0	0	0	0	0	0
  St. Cloud State	0	0	0	0	0	0	0	0	0	0	0	0	0	0	0	0
  St. Thomas	0	0	0	0	0	0	0	0	0	0	0	0	0	0	0	0
  #1 Wisconsin	0	0	0	0	0	0	0	0	0	0	0	0	0	0	0	0
  Championship: March 6, 2027 † indicates conference regular season champion; * indicates conference tournament champion Rankings: USCHO.com; updated September 17, 2026
- 2026–27 WHEA standings
  	Conference							Overall					
  	GP	W	L	T	PTS	GF	GA	GP	W	L	T	GF	GA
  Boston College	0	0	0	0	0	0	0	0	0	0	0	0	0
  Boston University	0	0	0	0	0	0	0	0	0	0	0	0	0
  Holy Cross	0	0	0	0	0	0	0	0	0	0	0	0	0
  Maine	0	0	0	0	0	0	0	0	0	0	0	0	0
  Merrimack	0	0	0	0	0	0	0	0	0	0	0	0	0
  New Hampshire	0	0	0	0	0	0	0	0	0	0	0	0	0
  #5 Northeastern	0	0	0	0	0	0	0	0	0	0	0	0	0
  Providence	0	0	0	0	0	0	0	0	0	0	0	0	0
  #7 UConn	0	0	0	0	0	0	0	0	0	0	0	0	0
  Vermont	0	0	0	0	0	0	0	0	0	0	0	0	0
  Championship: March 6, 2027 † indicates conference regular season champion; * indicates conference tournament champion Rankings: USCHO.com; updated September 17, 2026
