= 2026–27 NCAA Division I women's ice hockey rankings =

Women's ice hockey rankings

- NCAA tournament: 2027
- Preseason No. 1 (USA Today): Wisconsin
- Preseason No. 1 (USCHO): Wisconsin
- NCAA Division I women's ice hockey rankings

Two polls make up the 2026–27 NCAA Division I women's ice hockey rankings, the USCHO.com poll and the USA Hockey College Hockey poll. As the 2026–27 season progresses, rankings are updated weekly.

== Legend ==
	Increase in ranking
	Decrease in ranking
	Not ranked previous week
Italics	Number of first place votes
(#-#)	Win–loss–tie record
т	Tied with team above or below also with this symbol

== USCHO ==
	Preseason Sep 14	Week 1 Sep 28	Week 2 Oct 5	Week 3 Oct 12	Week 4 Oct 19	Week 5 Oct 26	Week 6 Nov 2	Week 7 Nov 9	Week 8 Nov 16	Week 9	Week 10	Week 11	Week 12	Week 13	Week 14	Week 15	Week 16	Week 17	Week 18	Week 19	Week 20	Week 21	Final	
1.	Wisconsin (13)	Wisconsin (2–0–0) (17)	Wisconsin (4–0–0) (16)	Ohio State (6–0–0) (20)	Ohio State (7–1–0) (18)	Ohio State (9–1–0) (20)	Ohio State (11–1–0) (20)	Ohio State (11–1–0) (20)	Ohio State (13–1–0) (20)															1.
2.	Ohio State (7)	Ohio State (2–0–0) (3)	Ohio State (4–0–0) (4)	Wisconsin (4–2–0)	Minnesota (5–1–0) (1)	Minnesota (7–1–0)	Minnesota (9–1–0)	Minnesota (9–1–0)	Minnesota (11–1–0)															2.
3.	Minnesota	Minnesota (0–0–0)	Minnesota (2–0–0)	Minnesota (4–0–0)	Wisconsin (6–2–0) (1)	Wisconsin (6–2–0)	Wisconsin (8–2–0)	Wisconsin (8–2–0)	Wisconsin (10–2–0)															3.
4.	Penn State	Penn State (0–2–0)	Penn State (2–2–0)	Quinnipiac (5–0–0)	Northeastern (3–1–1)	Northeastern (5–1–1)	Northeastern (7–1–1)	Princeton (8–0–0)	Princeton (8–0–0)															4.
5.	Northeastern	Northeastern (0–0–0)	Quinnipiac (4–0–0)	Penn State (3–3–0)	Quinnipiac (5–1–1)	Quinnipiac (7–1–1)	Princeton (6–0–0)	Northeastern (8–1–2)	Northeastern (10–1–2)															5.
6.	Quinnipiac	Quinnipiac (2–0–0)	Princeton (0–0–0)	Northeastern (2–1–0)	Penn State (5–3–0)	Princeton (4–0–0)	Quinnipiac (8–2–1)	Quinnipiac (10–2–1)	Quinnipiac (11–2–1)															6.
7.	Connecticut	Minnesota Duluth (2–0–0)	Northeastern (0–1–0)	Princeton (0–0–0)	Princeton (2–0–0)	Penn State (7–3–0)	Penn State (9–3–0)	Penn State (9–3–0)	Penn State (10–4–0)															7.
8.	Princeton	Princeton (0–0–0)	St. Cloud State (4–0–0)	Connecticut (2–2–0)	Colgate (6–0–0)	Colgate (6–2–0)	Colgate (8–2–0)	Colgate (8–4–0)	Clarkson (13–3–0)															8.
9.	Minnesota Duluth	Clarkson (2–0–0)	Connecticut (2–2–0)	Colgate (4–0–0)	St. Cloud State (6–2–0)	St. Cloud State (8–2–0)	Clarkson (10–2–0)	St. Cloud State (8–4–0)	Connecticut (8–4–2)															9.
10.	Yale	Yale (0–0–0)	Minnesota Duluth (3–1–0)	St. Cloud State (4–2–0)	Clarkson (6–2–0)	Clarkson (8–2–0)	St. Cloud State (8–4–0)	Clarkson (11–3–0)	Colgate (9–5–0) т															10.
11.	Cornell	Cornell (0–0–0)	Yale (0–0–0)	Clarkson (4–2–0)	Connecticut (2–4–0)	Connecticut (3–4–1)	Yale (2–1–1)	Connecticut (6–4–2) т	St. Cloud State (8–6–0) т															11.
12.	Clarkson	Connecticut (0–2–0)	Cornell (0–0–0)	Minnesota Duluth (4–2–0) т	Cornell (2–0–0)	Cornell (3–1–0)	Minnesota Duluth (6–4–0)	Minnesota Duluth (6–4–0) т	Minnesota Duluth (6–6–0)															12.
13.	Colgate	St. Cloud State (2–0–0)	Clarkson (2–2–0)	Yale (0–0–0) т	Minnesota Duluth (6–2–0)	Minnesota Duluth (6–2–0)	Connecticut (4–4–2)	Yale (3–2–1)	Yale (3–3–2)															13.
14.	Minnesota State	Colgate (0–0–0)	Colgate (2–0–0)	Cornell (0–0–0)	Yale (0–0–0)	Yale (1–0–1)	Cornell (4–2–0)	Cornell (4–4–0)	Cornell (5–4–1)															14.
15.	Mercyhurst	Minnesota State (2–0–0)	Vermont (1–1–0)	Vermont (3–1–0)	Vermont (3–3–0)	Boston College (4–2–0)	Boston College (6–3–0)	Boston College (6–5–0)	Mercyhurst (10–5–1)															15.
	Preseason Sep 14	Week 1 Sep 28	Week 2 Oct 5	Week 3 Oct 12	Week 4 Oct 19	Week 5 Oct 26	Week 6 Nov 2	Week 7 Nov 9	Week 8 Nov 16	Week 9	Week 10	Week 11	Week 12	Week 13	Week 14	Week 15	Week 16	Week 17	Week 18	Week 19	Week 20	Week 21	Final	
		Dropped: Mercyhurst	Dropped: Minnesota State	None	None	Dropped: Vermont	None	None	Dropped: Boston College	None	None	None	None	None	None	None	None	None	None	None	None	None	None	

== USA Hockey ==
	Preseason Sep 15	Week 1 Sep 22	Week 2 Sep 29	Week 3 Oct 6	Week 4 Oct 13	Week 5 Oct 20	Week 6 Oct 27	Week 7 Nov 3	Week 8 Nov 10	Week 9 Nov 17	Week 10	Week 11	Week 12	Week 13	Week 14	Week 15	Week 16	Week 17	Week 18	Week 19	Week 20	Week 21	Week 22	Week 23	Week 24	Final	
1.	Wisconsin (11)	Wisconsin (0–0–0) (12)	Wisconsin (2–0–0) (13)	Wisconsin (4–0–0) (15)	Ohio State (6–0–0) (18)	Ohio State (7–1–0) (19)	Ohio State (9–1–0) (19)	Ohio State (11–1–0) (19)	Ohio State (11–1–0) (19)	Ohio State (13–1–0) (19)																	1.
2.	Ohio State (8)	Ohio State (0–0–0) (7)	Ohio State (2–0–0) (6)	Ohio State (4–0–0) (4)	Wisconsin (4–2–0) (1)	Minnesota (5–1–0)	Minnesota (7–1–0)	Minnesota (9–1–0)	Minnesota (9–1–0)	Minnesota (11–1–0)																	2.
3.	Minnesota	Minnesota (0–0–0)	Minnesota (0–0–0)	Minnesota (2–0–0)	Minnesota (4–0–0)	Wisconsin (6–2–0)	Wisconsin (6–2–0)	Wisconsin (8–2–0)	Wisconsin (8–2–0)	Wisconsin (10–2–0)																	3.
4.	Northeastern	Northeastern (0–0–0)	Penn State (0–2–0)	Penn State (2–2–0)	Quinnipiac (5–0–0)	Northeastern (3–1–1)	Northeastern (5–1–1)	Northeastern (7–1–1)	Northeastern (8–1–2)	Princeton (8–0–0)																	4.
5.	Penn State	Quinnipiac (0–0–0)	Northeastern (0–0–0)	Quinnipiac (4–0–0)	Penn State (3–3–0)	Quinnipiac (5–1–1)	Quinnipiac (7–1–1)	Princeton (6–0–0)	Princeton (8–0–0)	Northeastern (10–1–2)																	5.
6.	Quinnipiac	Penn State (0–0–0)	Quinnipiac (2–0–0)	Northeastern (0–1–0)	Northeastern (2–1–0)	Princeton (2–0–0)	Princeton (4–0–0)	Quinnipiac (8–2–1)	Quinnipiac (10–2–1)	Quinnipiac (11–2–1)																	6.
7.	Connecticut	Connecticut (0–0–0)	Minnesota Duluth (2–0–0)	Princeton (0–0–0)	Princeton (0–0–0)	Penn State (5–3–0)	Penn State (7–3–0)	Penn State (9–3–0)	Penn State (9–3–0)	Penn State (10–4–0)																	7.
8.	Princeton	Princeton (0–0–0)	Princeton (0–0–0)	Connecticut (2–2–0)	Connecticut (2–2–0)	Colgate (6–0–0)	Colgate (6–2–0) т	Colgate (8–2–0)	Colgate (8–4–0)	St. Cloud State (8–6–0)																	8.
9.	Minnesota Duluth	Minnesota Duluth (0–0–0)	Clarkson (2–0–0)	Minnesota Duluth (3–1–0)	Colgate (4–0–0) т	St. Cloud State (6–2–0)	St. Cloud State (8–2–0) т	St. Cloud State (8–4–0)	St. Cloud State (8–4–0)	Connecticut (8–4–2)																	9.
10.	Cornell	Cornell (0–0–0)	Cornell (0–0–0)	St. Cloud State (4–0–0)	St. Cloud State (4–2–0) т	Connecticut (2–4–0)	Clarkson (8–2–0)	Clarkson (10–2–0)	Connecticut (6–4–2)	Colgate (9–5–0)																	10.
11.	Yale	Yale (0–0–0)	Connecticut (0–2–0)	Cornell (0–0–0)	Minnesota Duluth (4–2–0)	Clarkson (6–2–0)	Connecticut (3–4–1)	Yale (2–1–1)	Minnesota Duluth (6–4–0)	Clarkson (13–3–0)																	11.
12.	Clarkson	Clarkson (0–0–0)	Yale (0–0–0)	Yale (0–0–0)	Clarkson (4–2–0)	Minnesota Duluth (6–2–0)	Minnesota Duluth (6–2–0)	Minnesota Duluth (6–4–0)	Clarkson (11–3–0)	Minnesota Duluth (6–6–0)																	12.
13.	Minnesota State	Minnesota State (0–0–0)	St. Cloud State (2–0–0)	Clarkson (2–2–0)	Cornell (0–0–0)	Cornell (2–0–0)	Cornell (3–1–0)	Connecticut (4–4–2)	Yale (3–2–1)	Yale (3–3–2)																	13.
14.	Mercyhurst	Mercyhurst (2–0–0)	Minnesota State (2–0–0)	Colgate (2–0–0)	Yale (0–0–0)	Yale (0–0–0)	Yale (1–0–1)	Cornell (4–2–0)	Cornell (4–4–0)	Cornell (5–4–1)																	14.
15.	Colgate	Colgate (0–0–0)	Colgate (0–0–0)	Minnesota State (2–2–0)	Minnesota State (2–2–0)	Vermont (3–3–0)	Vermont (3–3–0)	Boston College (6–3–0)	Boston College (6–5–0)	Mercyhurst (10–5–1)																	15.
	Preseason Sep 15	Week 1 Sep 22	Week 2 Sep 29	Week 3 Oct 6	Week 4 Oct 13	Week 5 Oct 20	Week 6 Oct 27	Week 7 Nov 3	Week 8 Nov 10	Week 9 Nov 17	Week 10	Week 11	Week 12	Week 13	Week 14	Week 15	Week 16	Week 17	Week 18	Week 19	Week 20	Week 21	Week 22	Week 23	Week 24	Final	
		None	Dropped: Mercyhurst	None	None	Dropped: Minnesota State	None	Dropped: Vermont	None	Dropped: Boston College	None	None	None	None	None	None	None	None	None	None	None	None	None	None	None	None	
