= Western Collegiate Hockey Association =

College athletic conference in the Midwestern United States

- Current season, competition or edition: 2026–27 WCHA women's ice hockey season
- Formerly: Midwest Collegiate Hockey League (1951–53); Western Intercollegiate Hockey League (1953–58)
- Association: NCAA
- Founded: 1951
- Commissioner: Michelle McAteer
- Sports fielded: Ice hockey; men's: no; women's: yes
- Division: Division I
- No. of teams: 8
- Headquarters: Bloomington, Minnesota
- Region: Midwestern United States
- Website: wcha.com

Locations
- Locations of WCHA teams prior to the dissolution of the men's division.

The Western Collegiate Hockey Association (WCHA) is a college ice hockey conference which operates in the Midwestern United States. It participates in the NCAA's Division I as a women's-only conference.

From 1951 to 1999, it operated as a men-only league, adding women's competition in the 1999–2000 season. It operated men's and women's leagues through the 2020–21 season; during this period, the men's WCHA expanded to include teams far removed from its traditional Midwestern base, with members in Alabama, Alaska, and Colorado at different times. The men's side of the league officially disbanded after seven members left to form the revived Central Collegiate Hockey Association (CCHA); the WCHA remains in operation as a women-only league.

WCHA member teams won a record 38 men's NCAA hockey championships, most recently in 2011 by the Minnesota Duluth Bulldogs. A WCHA team also finished as the national runner-up a total of 28 times. WCHA teams also won the first 13 NCAA women's titles, which were first awarded in 2001.

== History ==
The league was founded in 1951 as the Midwest Collegiate Hockey League (MCHL), then was known as the Western Intercollegiate Hockey League (WIHL) until 1958. The WIHL disbanded in 1958 after Minnesota and the three Michigan schools withdrew in protest of Colorado College, Denver and North Dakota recruiting overage Canadians. While this didn't violate NCAA rules, the four "M" schools felt it violated the spirit of intercollegiate athletics. The current Western Collegiate Hockey Association was founded for the 1959–60 season after the former WIHL schools concluded that the region needed a strong league. Despite this, Denver and Minnesota would not play each other until 1973, when the league took over scheduling from the individual members. The 2005 NCAA Frozen Four hockey tournament finals were noteworthy when all four teams came from the WCHA.

WCHA teams also won the first 13 NCAA women's titles, which were first awarded in 2001. In 2006, WCHA member Wisconsin was the first school to capture both the men's and women's Division I ice hockey championships in the same season.

The men's regular season conference champion was awarded the MacNaughton Cup, while the league's tournament champion winning the WCHA Final Five took home the Broadmoor Trophy.

=== 2013 realignment ===
On March 22, 2011, Minnesota and Wisconsin announced that their men's teams planned to leave the league in order to form a hockey Big Ten Conference in 2013–14, along with Penn State, which would start a varsity hockey program in 2012–13, and Central Collegiate Hockey Association members Michigan, Michigan State, and Ohio State.

In response to the creation of the Big Ten men's hockey conference, Denver, Colorado College, North Dakota, Omaha, Minnesota Duluth, and St. Cloud State left the WCHA to join Miami University and Western Michigan of the CCHA to create the National Collegiate Hockey Conference. Facing membership at 4 teams for the 2013–14 season, the WCHA conference added one of its former members, Northern Michigan of the CCHA, on July 15, 2011.

On August 25, 2011, the WCHA announced that it had invited the University of Alaska Fairbanks, Bowling Green, Ferris State, and Lake Superior State to join beginning in the 2013–14 season. On August 26, 2011, Alaska-Fairbanks, Ferris State, and Lake Superior State accepted their invitations and joined Northern Michigan in the WCHA in 2013. After much deliberation, on October 4, 2011, Bowling Green decided to join the WCHA as well in 2013. On January 17, 2013, the WCHA admitted Alabama–Huntsville to the league, effective in the 2013–14 season.

This realignment activity only affected the men's side of the WCHA. Even after Penn State took the ice with both men's and women's teams, the Big Ten still had only four members with varsity women's hockey (Michigan and Michigan State field only men's teams). This meant that the women's side of the WCHA remained intact for the immediate future.

=== After realignment ===
The next change in the conference membership came shortly after the 2016–17 season, when North Dakota announced that it would drop women's hockey.

During the 2019 offseason, the future of the men's side of the WCHA fell into serious doubt when its seven Midwestern members—Bemidji State, Bowling Green, Ferris State, Lake Superior State, Michigan Tech, Minnesota State, and Northern Michigan—notified the WCHA that they would leave the league after the 2020–21 season, potentially forming a new men's hockey conference. In February 2020, these seven schools announced they would form a new CCHA.

At the time the seven Midwestern members announced their plans to leave, the two Alaska teams were facing a crisis following the veto by state governor Mike Dunleavy of over $100 million in funding for the University of Alaska system, a move that was seen as potentially ending intercollegiate athletics entirely at both the Anchorage and Fairbanks campuses. The cuts led the UA system to start the process of consolidating the three-campus system into a single accredited institution (though retaining the existing campuses), with the system president telling local media that a single accreditation would likely lead to the Anchorage and Fairbanks athletic programs being combined into a single program. While both campuses continued to sponsor men's ice hockey in the 2019–20 season, the future of at least one of the teams beyond that point was then seen as uncertain at best. Later developments saw many of the budget cuts pulled back, as well as a temporary halt to work on a single UA system accreditation; this led the UA system to announce that athletics at both campuses would continue as is through the 2020–21 school year.

In November 2019, Alabama–Huntsville submitted a withdrawal letter to the WCHA, stating that it also planned to leave after the 2020–21 season. At the time, UAH was discussing potential future options with the two Alaska campuses. However, UAH subsequently dropped hockey effective immediately on May 22, 2020, due to the financial impacts from the COVID-19 pandemic on its athletic department. On May 29, 2020, UAH President Darren Dawson announced that men's hockey would return for the 2020–21 season after more than $750,000 in private contributions were made in the week prior. This reprieve proved temporary, as the school and its hockey supporters agreed that the continuation of the sport beyond 2020–21 would be contingent on finding a new conference home; when no conference move materialized, the hockey program was dropped again (although UAH officially called it a "suspension").

In August 2020, Alaska Anchorage announced that it would drop hockey after the 2020–21 season. The University of Alaska Board of Regents offered the hockey team a chance at reinstatement in September if they could raise 2 seasons worth of expenses, approximately $3 million, by February 2021. The fundraising was divided into 2 parts: $1.5 million in cash, and the remainder in firm pledges. As of December 2020, the team had begun fundraising for the needed money.

The men's WCHA would fold after the 2020–21 season, but the women's WCHA announced a further expansion effective in 2021–22 with the arrival of St. Thomas, a Twin Cities school that received NCAA approval to directly transition from Division III to Division I. St. Thomas had been expelled from its longtime D-III home of the Minnesota Intercollegiate Athletic Conference effective with the end of the 2020–21 school year due to perceptions by many members that it had grown too strong for that conference in multiple sports. The Summit League offered the Tommies a D-I home, and backed the school's bid to directly transition from D-III.

== Members ==
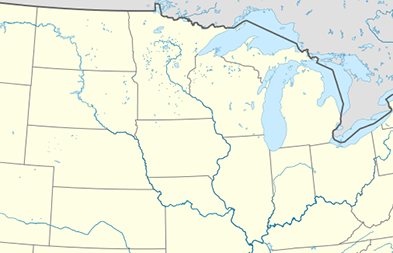
2026 WCHA Teams

The now women-only WCHA has 8 members following the 2021 arrival of St. Thomas. The men's side of the conference had 10 members in its final season of 2020–21, at which time only two schools, Bemidji State and Minnesota State, had both men's and women's teams in the conference.

Institution	Location	Founded	Joined	Affiliation	Enrollment	Nickname	Colors	NCAA women's Championship	Primary conference
Bemidji State University	Bemidji, Minnesota	1919	1999	Public	3,926	Beavers		0	Northern Sun (D-II)
University of Minnesota	Minneapolis & Saint Paul, Minnesota	1851	1999	Public	56,666	Golden Gophers		6	Big Ten
University of Minnesota Duluth	Duluth, Minnesota	1947	1999	Public	9,253	Bulldogs		5	Northern Sun (D-II)
Minnesota State University	Mankato, Minnesota	1867	1999	Public	15,251	Mavericks		0	Northern Sun (D-II)
Ohio State University	Columbus, Ohio	1870	1999	Public	61,443	Buckeyes		2	Big Ten
St. Cloud State University	St. Cloud, Minnesota	1869	1999	Public	10,164	Huskies		0	Northern Sun (D-II)
University of St. Thomas	Saint Paul, Minnesota	1885	2021	Private	9,445	Tommies		0	Summit League
University of Wisconsin–Madison	Madison, Wisconsin	1848	1999	Public	52,097	Badgers		8	Big Ten

=== Final men's members ===
Institution	Location	Founded	Joined	Affiliation	Nickname	Colors	NCAA men's Championships	Primary conference	Subsequent conference
University of Alabama in Huntsville	Huntsville, Alabama	1950	2013	Public	Chargers		0	Gulf South (D-II)	N/A (program suspended)
University of Alaska Anchorage	Anchorage, Alaska	1977	1993	Public	Seawolves		0	Great Northwest (D-II)	Independent
University of Alaska Fairbanks	Fairbanks, Alaska	1917	2013	Public	Nanooks		0	Great Northwest (D-II)	Independent
Bemidji State University	Bemidji, Minnesota	1919	2010 (men)	Public	Beavers		0	Northern Sun (D-II)	CCHA
Bowling Green State University	Bowling Green, Ohio	1910	2013	Public	Falcons		1	MAC	CCHA
Ferris State University	Big Rapids, Michigan	1884	2013	Public	Bulldogs		0	GLIAC (D-II)	CCHA
Lake Superior State University	Sault Ste. Marie, Michigan	1946	2013	Public	Lakers		3	GLIAC (D-II)	CCHA
Michigan Technological University	Houghton, Michigan	1885	1951–1981; 1984	Public	Huskies		3	GLIAC (D-II)	CCHA
Minnesota State University	Mankato, Minnesota	1867	1999	Public	Mavericks		0	Northern Sun (D-II)	CCHA
Northern Michigan University	Marquette, Michigan	1899	1984–1997; 2013	Public	Wildcats		1	GLIAC (D-II)	CCHA

=== Other former men's members ===
Institution	City	State	Joined	Left	NCAA championships (Note: Total championships (Championships won while WCHA member))	Subsequent conference	Current conference
Colorado College	Colorado Springs	Colorado	1951	2013	2 (1)	NCHC	
Denver	Denver	Colorado	1951	2013	10 (7)	NCHC	
Michigan	Ann Arbor	Michigan	1951	1981	9 (5)	CCHA	Big Ten
Michigan State	East Lansing	Michigan	1951	1981	3 (1)	CCHA	Big Ten
Minnesota	Minneapolis & St. Paul	Minnesota	1951	2013	5 (5)	Big Ten	
Minnesota Duluth	Duluth	Minnesota	1966	2013	3 (1)	NCHC	
Omaha	Omaha	Nebraska	2010	2013	0 (0)	NCHC	
North Dakota	Grand Forks	North Dakota	1951	2013	8 (7)	NCHC	
Notre Dame	Notre Dame	Indiana	1971	1981	0 (0)	CCHA	Big Ten
St. Cloud State	St. Cloud	Minnesota	1990	2013	0 (0)	NCHC	
Wisconsin	Madison	Wisconsin	1969	2013	6 (6)	Big Ten	

=== Former women's member ===
Institution	City	State	Joined	Left	NCAA championships (Note: Total championships (Championships won while WCHA member))	Note
North Dakota	Grand Forks	North Dakota	2004	2017	0 (0)	North Dakota terminated its women's ice hockey program.

== Conference arenas ==
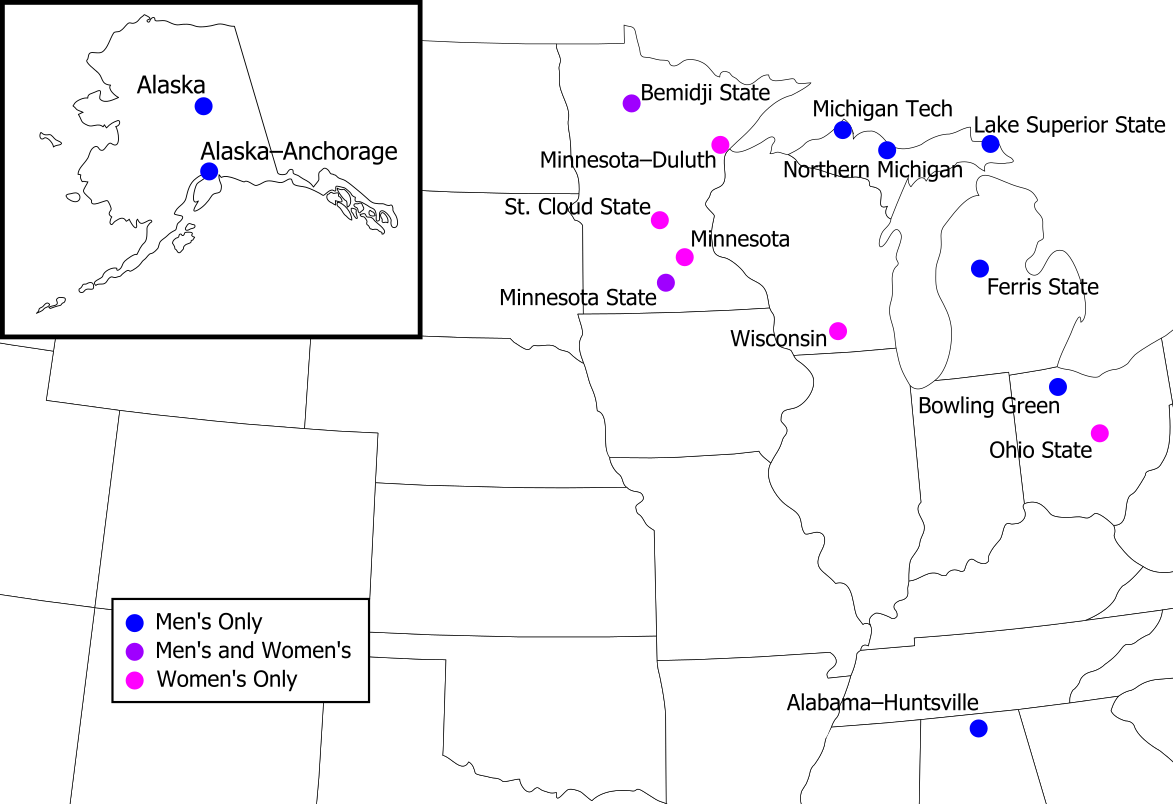
Locations of Western Collegiate Hockey Association member institutions prior to the dissolution of the men's division.

School	Arena	Capacity
Bemidji State	Sanford Center	4,373
Minnesota	Ridder Arena	3,400
Minnesota Duluth	AMSOIL Arena	6,756
Minnesota State	Mayo Clinic Health System Event Center	4,832
Ohio State	Ohio State University Ice Rink	1,000
St. Cloud State	Herb Brooks National Hockey Center	5,159
St. Thomas	Lee and Penny Anderson Arena	4,000
Wisconsin	LaBahn Arena	2,273

== Championships, Frozen Fours, and NCAA Tournament Appearances ==
School	NCAA Championships	NCAA Runner-Up	NCAA Frozen Fours	NCAA Tournament Appearances	Conference Championships	Conference Tournament Championships
Bemidji State						
Minnesota	6 (2004, 2005, 2012, 2013, 2015, 2016)	3 (2006, 2014, 2019)	16 (2002-06, 2009, 2010, 2012-17, 2019, 2023, 2025)	21 (2002-06, 2008-19, 2022-25)	11 (2001, 2002, 2004, 2005, 2009, 2010, 2013-15, 2019, 2022)	8 (2002, 2004, 2005, 2012-14, 2018, 2023)
Minnesota Duluth	5 (2001-03, 2008, 2010)	2 (2007, 2022)	9 (2001-03, 2007-10, 2021, 2022)	16 (2001-03, 2005-11, 2017, 2021-25)	3 (2000, 2003, 2010)	6 (2000-03, 2008, 2010)
Minnesota State						
Ohio State	2 (2022, 2024)	2 (2023, 2025)	6 (2018, 2021-25)	7 (2018, 2020-25)	2 (2023, 2024)	3 (2020, 2022, 2026)
St. Cloud State						
St. Thomas						
Wisconsin	9 (2006, 2007, 2009, 2011, 2019, 2021, 2023, 2025, 2026)	4 (2008, 2012, 2017, 2024)	17 (2006-09, 2011, 2012, 2014-19, 2021, 2023-26)	19 (2005-09, 2011, 2012, 2014-19, 2021-26)	11 (2006, 2007, 2011, 2012, 2016-18, 2020, 2021, 2025, 2026)	11 (2006, 2007, 2009, 2011, 2015-17, 2019, 2021, 2024, 2025)

=== Former Members ===
School	NCAA Championships	NCAA Runner-Up	NCAA Frozen Fours	NCAA Tournament Appearances	Conference Championships	Conference Tournament Championships
North Dakota				2 (2012, 2013)		

== Awards (men's) ==
At the conclusion of each regular season schedule the coaches of each WCHA team vote which players they choose to be on the two to four All-Conference teams: first team and second team with a rookie team added in 1990–91 and a third team added in 1995–96. Additionally they vote to award up to 5 individual trophies to an eligible player at the same time. The WCHA also awards a Most Valuable Player in Tournament, which is voted on at the conclusion of the conference tournament. Only the Coach of the Year award has been bestowed in each year of the WCHA's existence, making it the oldest continually-awarded conference award in Division I ice hockey.

=== All-Conference teams ===
Award	Inaugural year
First Team	1959–60
Second Team	1959–60
Third Team	1995–96
Rookie Team	1990–91
All-Tournament Team	1988

=== Individual awards ===
Award	Inaugural year
Player of the Year	1960–61
Defensive Player of the Year	1991–92
Goaltender of the Year	1987–88
Sophomore of the Year	1959–60
Rookie of the Year	1969–70
Coach of the Year	1959–60
Student-Athlete of the Year	1986–87
Most Valuable Player in Tournament	1988

=== Team awards ===
Award	Inaugural year
MacNaughton Cup	1951–52*
Broadmoor Trophy	1985

== National Championships ==
WCHA schools have won 37 NCAA Men's Ice Hockey National Championships.

Year	School
1951*	Michigan
1952*	Michigan
1953*	Michigan
1955*	Michigan
1956*	Michigan
1957*	Colorado College
1958*	Denver
1960	Denver
1961	Denver
1962	Michigan Tech
1963	North Dakota
1964	Michigan
1965	Michigan Tech
1966	Michigan State
1968	Denver
1969	Denver
1973	Wisconsin
1974	Minnesota
1975	Michigan Tech
1976	Minnesota
1977	Wisconsin
1979	Minnesota
1980	North Dakota
1981	Wisconsin
1982	North Dakota
1983	Wisconsin
1987	North Dakota
1990	Wisconsin
1991	Northern Michigan
1997	North Dakota
2000	North Dakota
2002	Minnesota
2003	Minnesota
2004	Denver
2005	Denver
2006	Wisconsin
2011	Minnesota Duluth

* Prior to 1959 the teams that formed the WCHA played in the MCHL or the WIHL.

WCHA schools have won 19 NCAA Women's Ice Hockey National Championships.

Year	School
2001	Minnesota Duluth
2002	Minnesota Duluth
2003	Minnesota Duluth
2004	Minnesota
2005	Minnesota
2006	Wisconsin
2007	Wisconsin
2008	Minnesota Duluth
2009	Wisconsin
2010	Minnesota Duluth
2011	Wisconsin
2012	Minnesota
2013	Minnesota
2015	Minnesota
2016	Minnesota
2019	Wisconsin
2021	Wisconsin
2022	Ohio State
2023	Wisconsin
2024	Ohio State
2025	Wisconsin
