= 2026 IIHF Women's World Championship rosters =

List of ice hockey team rosters

Each team's roster consists of at least 15 skaters (forwards, and defenders) and two goaltenders, and at most 20 skaters and three goaltenders. All ten participating nations, through the confirmation of their respective national associations, had to submit a roster by the first IIHF directorate.

== Group A ==
=== Austria ===
The roster was announced on 9 October 2026.

Head coach: (Sweden) Alexander Bröms

No.	Pos.	Name	Height	Weight	Birthdate	Team
4	F	Marja Linzbichler	1.66 m (5 ft 5 in)	56 kg (123 lb)	28 May 2004 (aged 22)	(United States) Norwich Cadets
6	F	Emma Lintner	1.81 m (5 ft 11 in)	70 kg (150 lb)	15 December 2008 (aged 17)	(Switzerland) EV Zug
7	F	Theresa Schafzahl	1.71 m (5 ft 7 in)	63 kg (139 lb)	12 April 2000 (aged 26)	(United States) Boston Fleet
11	F	Emma Hofbauer	1.58 m (5 ft 2 in)	60 kg (130 lb)	30 November 2004 (aged 21)	(United States) Providence Friars
12	D	Annika Fazokas	1.67 m (5 ft 6 in)	59 kg (130 lb)	6 April 1997 (aged 29)	(Switzerland) EV Zug
13	F	Tamara Grascher – A	1.68 m (5 ft 6 in)	62 kg (137 lb)	13 June 1994 (aged 32)	(Austria) Graz99ers Huskies
14	D	Anna Billa	1.65 m (5 ft 5 in)	65 kg (143 lb)	21 June 2006 (aged 20)	(United States) Holy Cross Crusaders
15	D	Emma Mörtl	1.72 m (5 ft 8 in)	61 kg (134 lb)	22 November 2003 (aged 22)	(Austria) Sabres St. Pölten
16	F	Eva Beiter	1.63 m (5 ft 4 in)	55 kg (121 lb)	26 December 1988 (aged 37)	(Austria) EHC Lustenau
19	F	Amelie Suppan	1.65 m (5 ft 5 in)	57 kg (126 lb)	8 January 2009 (aged 17)	(Austria) Sabres St. Pölten
21	F	Lena Dauböck	1.65 m (5 ft 5 in)	59 kg (130 lb)	5 June 2003 (aged 23)	(Austria) KSV Highlanders
22	D	Artemis Tekin	1.64 m (5 ft 5 in)	60 kg (130 lb)	3 May 2008 (aged 18)	(Austria) Sabres St. Pölten
23	D	Antonia Matzka – A	1.73 m (5 ft 8 in)	70 kg (150 lb)	16 February 1999 (aged 27)	(Austria) Sabres St. Pölten
24	F	Anja Trummer	1.72 m (5 ft 8 in)	63 kg (139 lb)	24 July 2001 (aged 25)	(Switzerland) ZSC Lions
25	G	Selma Luggin	1.78 m (5 ft 10 in)	67 kg (148 lb)	5 October 2002 (aged 24)	(Austria) Sabres St. Pölten
26	F	Leonie Kutzer	1.61 m (5 ft 3 in)	53 kg (117 lb)	26 March 2005 (aged 21)	(Switzerland) EV Zug
28	F	Hanna Obermayr	1.67 m (5 ft 6 in)	60 kg (130 lb)	13 July 2004 (aged 22)	(Austria) Sabres St. Pölten
29	D	Lisa Schröfl	1.65 m (5 ft 5 in)	60 kg (130 lb)	3 January 2004 (aged 22)	(Austria) KSV Highlanders
31	G	Magdalena Luggin	1.75 m (5 ft 9 in)	58 kg (128 lb)	6 November 2005 (aged 21)	(United States) Mercyhurst Lakers
40	F	Emma Pfeffer	1.65 m (5 ft 5 in)	52 kg (115 lb)	11 September 2004 (aged 22)	(United States) Merrimack Warriors
55	D	Laura Nagy	1.74 m (5 ft 9 in)	74 kg (163 lb)	2 October 2006 (aged 20)	(United States) LIU Sharks
81	G	Anja Adamitsch	1.65 m (5 ft 5 in)	53 kg (117 lb)	16 October 2001 (aged 25)	(Austria) KSV Highlanders
88	F	Vanessa Picka	1.65 m (5 ft 5 in)	60 kg (130 lb)	3 July 2008 (aged 18)	(Sweden) Leksands IF
93	D	Charlotte Wittich	1.71 m (5 ft 7 in)	70 kg (150 lb)	23 July 1993 (aged 33)	(Austria) Sabres St. Pölten
94	F	Anna Meixner – C	1.61 m (5 ft 3 in)	64 kg (141 lb)	16 June 1994 (aged 32)	(Sweden) Brynäs IF

=== Czechia ===
The roster was announced on 1 November 2026.

Head coach: (United States) Brian Idalski

No.	Pos.	Name	Height	Weight	Birthdate	Team
2	D	Aneta Tejralová – C	1.64 m (5 ft 5 in)	53 kg (117 lb)	4 January 1996 (aged 30)	(United States) Seattle Torrent
3	F	Adéla Šapovalivová	1.61 m (5 ft 3 in)	58 kg (128 lb)	17 May 2006 (aged 20)	(United States) Wisconsin Badgers
4	D	Daniela Pejšová	1.75 m (5 ft 9 in)	70 kg (150 lb)	14 August 2002 (aged 24)	(United States) San Jose Sea Lions
6	F	Linda Vocetková	1.74 m (5 ft 9 in)	70 kg (150 lb)	22 March 2007 (aged 19)	(United States) Colgate Raiders
7	D	Klára Seroiszková	1.75 m (5 ft 9 in)	73 kg (161 lb)	25 January 2001 (aged 25)	(Switzerland) HC Davos
8	F	Tereza Pištěková	1.71 m (5 ft 7 in)	60 kg (130 lb)	3 June 2005 (aged 21)	(Sweden) SDE HF
9	F	Tereza Gildainová	1.64 m (5 ft 5 in)	63 kg (139 lb)	31 January 2008 (aged 18)	(United States) Lovell Academy Lions
11	D	Aneta Paroubková	1.60 m (5 ft 3 in)	65 kg (143 lb)	10 January 2008 (aged 18)	(Canada) Stoney Creek Sabres
12	F	Klára Hymlárová	1.63 m (5 ft 4 in)	67 kg (148 lb)	27 February 1999 (aged 27)	(United States) Minnesota Frost
16	F	Kateřina Mrázová	1.63 m (5 ft 4 in)	61 kg (134 lb)	19 October 1992 (aged 34)	(Canada) Ottawa Charge
18	F	Michaela Pejzlová	1.69 m (5 ft 7 in)	62 kg (137 lb)	4 June 1997 (aged 29)	(Sweden) Frölunda HC
19	F	Natálie Mlýnková	1.61 m (5 ft 3 in)	67 kg (148 lb)	24 May 2001 (aged 25)	(United States) San Jose Sea Lions
20	F	Barbora Juříčková	1.68 m (5 ft 6 in)	60 kg (130 lb)	21 October 2006 (aged 20)	(United States) St. Lawrence Saints
22	F	Tereza Plosová	1.77 m (5 ft 10 in)	64 kg (141 lb)	5 July 2006 (aged 20)	(United States) Minnesota Golden Golphers
24	D	Sára Čajanová	1.70 m (5 ft 7 in)	63 kg (139 lb)	10 December 2002 (aged 23)	(Sweden) Brynäs IF
26	F	Vendula Přibylová – A	1.71 m (5 ft 7 in)	78 kg (172 lb)	23 March 1996 (aged 30)	(Sweden) Linköping HC
27	D	Tereza Radová	1.76 m (5 ft 9 in)	74 kg (163 lb)	22 November 2001 (aged 24)	(Hungary) HK Budapest
28	D	Noemi Neubauerová – A	1.73 m (5 ft 8 in)	68 kg (150 lb)	15 December 1999 (aged 26)	(United States) Seattle Torrent
29	G	Klára Peslarová	1.65 m (5 ft 5 in)	64 kg (141 lb)	23 November 1996 (aged 29)	(Sweden) Brynäs IF
30	G	Daniela Nováková	1.75 m (5 ft 9 in)	70 kg (150 lb)	18 March 2007 (aged 19)	(United States) St. Thomas Tommies
42	D	Ellen Jarabková	1.75 m (5 ft 9 in)	78 kg (172 lb)	21 January 2009 (aged 17)	(Sweden) MoDo Hockey
44	F	Barbora Bartáková	1.68 m (5 ft 6 in)	62 kg (137 lb)	24 January 2004 (aged 22)	(Sweden) Djurgårdens IF
45	G	Aneta Šenková	1.68 m (5 ft 6 in)	73 kg (161 lb)	24 June 2006 (aged 20)	(United States) Clarkson Golden Knights
86	F	Anežka Čabelová	1.63 m (5 ft 4 in)	60 kg (130 lb)	21 August 2006 (aged 20)	(United States) Boston University Terriers
98	F	Kristýna Kaltounková	1.74 m (5 ft 9 in)	75 kg (165 lb)	14 April 2002 (aged 24)	(United States) New York Sirens

=== Germany ===
The roster was announced on 7 October 2026.

Head coach: (Canada) Jeff MacLeod

No.	Pos.	Name	Height	Weight	Birthdate	Team
7	F	Franziska Feldmeier	1.65 m (5 ft 5 in)	67 kg (148 lb)	5 February 1999 (aged 27)	(Germany) Eisbären Juniors Berlin
8	D	Ronja Hark – A	1.58 m (5 ft 2 in)	60 kg (130 lb)	17 August 2003 (aged 23)	(Germany) ECDC Memmingen
9	F	Svenja Voigt	1.65 m (5 ft 5 in)	60 kg (130 lb)	29 March 2004 (aged 22)	(Sweden) Färjestad BK
10	D	Emilija Birka	1.66 m (5 ft 5 in)	59 kg (130 lb)	26 March 2009 (aged 17)	(Germany) EC Bad Tölz U17
11	F	Nicola Hadraschek	1.66 m (5 ft 5 in)	67 kg (148 lb)	10 September 1996 (aged 30)	(Germany) ECDC Memmingen
12	F	Aileena Dopheide	1.73 m (5 ft 8 in)	65 kg (143 lb)	30 September 2000 (aged 26)	(Germany) ERC Ingolstadt
13	F	Luisa Welcke	1.66 m (5 ft 5 in)	70 kg (150 lb)	29 April 2002 (aged 24)	(Germany) Mad Dogs Mannheim
14	D	Carina Strobel	1.72 m (5 ft 8 in)	64 kg (141 lb)	11 September 1997 (aged 29)	(Germany) ECDC Memmingen
16	F	Jule Schiefer	1.74 m (5 ft 9 in)	69 kg (152 lb)	12 September 2001 (aged 25)	(Germany) ECDC Memmingen
17	F	Emily Nix	1.74 m (5 ft 9 in)	79 kg (174 lb)	12 January 1998 (aged 28)	(Sweden) Frölunda HC
19	F	Marie-Kristin Schmid	1.65 m (5 ft 5 in)	58 kg (128 lb)	15 December 1996 (aged 29)	(Germany) ECDC Memmingen
20	D	Daria Gleißner – C	1.71 m (5 ft 7 in)	72 kg (159 lb)	30 June 1993 (aged 33)	(Germany) ECDC Memmingen
21	D	Tabea Botthof	1.76 m (5 ft 9 in)	78 kg (172 lb)	1 June 2000 (aged 26)	(Germany) Mad Dogs Mannheim
23	F	Lilli Welcke	1.66 m (5 ft 5 in)	70 kg (150 lb)	29 April 2002 (aged 24)	(Germany) Mad Dogs Mannheim
24	F	Alexandra Boico	1.74 m (5 ft 9 in)	68 kg (150 lb)	12 June 2009 (aged 17)	(United States) Bishop Kearney Selects
25	F	Laura Kluge – A	1.80 m (5 ft 11 in)	63 kg (139 lb)	6 November 1996 (aged 30)	(United States) Boston Fleet
26	D	Tara Schmitz	1.66 m (5 ft 5 in)	63 kg (139 lb)	16 March 1998 (aged 28)	(Germany) Mad Dogs Mannheim
28	D	Nina Jobst-Smith	1.70 m (5 ft 7 in)	69 kg (152 lb)	30 August 2001 (aged 25)	(United States) Detroit Clutch
29	F	Nina Christof	1.65 m (5 ft 5 in)	70 kg (150 lb)	18 August 2003 (aged 23)	(Sweden) MoDo Hockey
34	F	Celina Haider	1.70 m (5 ft 7 in)	60 kg (130 lb)	20 July 2000 (aged 26)	(Germany) Eisbären Juniors Berlin
35	G	Sandra Abstreiter	1.81 m (5 ft 11 in)	78 kg (172 lb)	23 July 1998 (aged 28)	(Canada) Hamilton Havoc
41	F	Mathilda Heine	1.69 m (5 ft 7 in)	68 kg (150 lb)	18 February 2009 (aged 17)	(Germany) Eisbären Juniors Berlin
46	D	Hanna Weichenhain	1.72 m (5 ft 8 in)	66 kg (146 lb)	18 October 2008 (aged 18)	(Germany) Eisbären Juniors Berlin
47	F	Anabel Seyrer	1.67 m (5 ft 6 in)	58 kg (128 lb)	22 April 2008 (aged 18)	(United States) Norwich Cadets
70	G	Lisa Hemmerle	1.67 m (5 ft 6 in)	63 kg (139 lb)	11 December 1995 (aged 30)	(Germany) ERC Ingolstadt
75	G	Chiara Schultes	1.68 m (5 ft 6 in)	64 kg (141 lb)	22 July 2005 (aged 21)	(Germany) ECDC Memmingen

=== Switzerland ===
The roster was announced on 1 November 2026.

Head coach: (Canada) Shannon Miller

No.	Pos.	Name	Height	Weight	Birthdate	Team
5	F	Nora Harju	1.69 m (5 ft 7 in)	67 kg (148 lb)	5 January 2003 (aged 23)	(Switzerland) ZSC Lions
6	D	Mara Frey	1.70 m (5 ft 7 in)	66 kg (146 lb)	26 September 2002 (aged 24)	(Switzerland) EV Zug
11	F	Laura Zimmermann	1.63 m (5 ft 4 in)	73 kg (161 lb)	5 April 2003 (aged 23)	(United States) St. Cloud State Huskies
13	F	Ivana Wey	1.72 m (5 ft 8 in)	68 kg (150 lb)	4 February 2006 (aged 20)	(United States) Northeastern Huskies
15	D	Laure Mériguet	1.73 m (5 ft 8 in)	65 kg (143 lb)	15 August 2008 (aged 18)	(Switzerland) Genève Futur Hockey
16	D	Nicole Vallario	1.66 m (5 ft 5 in)	71 kg (157 lb)	30 August 2001 (aged 25)	(United States) New York Sirens
18	D	Stefanie Wetli	1.73 m (5 ft 8 in)	75 kg (165 lb)	4 February 2000 (aged 26)	(Switzerland) ZSC Lions
20	G	Andrea Brändli	1.69 m (5 ft 7 in)	75 kg (165 lb)	5 June 1997 (aged 29)	(United States) Detroit Clutch
21	F	Rahel Enzler	1.63 m (5 ft 4 in)	64 kg (141 lb)	30 July 2000 (aged 26)	(Switzerland) EV Zug
22	F	Sinja Leemann	1.68 m (5 ft 6 in)	66 kg (146 lb)	19 April 2002 (aged 24)	(Switzerland) SC Bern
25	F	Alina Müller – C	1.67 m (5 ft 6 in)	65 kg (143 lb)	12 March 1998 (aged 28)	(Canada) Hamilton Havoc
26	F	Naemi Herzig – A	1.68 m (5 ft 6 in)	70 kg (150 lb)	21 March 2007 (aged 19)	(United States) Holy Cross Crusaders
27	F	Elisa Dalessi	1.53 m (5 ft 0 in)	56 kg (123 lb)	30 January 2007 (aged 19)	(Switzerland) HC Davos
28	F	Alina Marti	1.68 m (5 ft 6 in)	70 kg (150 lb)	23 April 2004 (aged 22)	(Switzerland) EV Zug
29	G	Saskia Maurer	1.66 m (5 ft 5 in)	60 kg (130 lb)	29 July 2001 (aged 25)	(Switzerland) SC Bern
30	G	Chiara Pfosi	1.78 m (5 ft 10 in)	80 kg (180 lb)	29 March 1998 (aged 28)	(Switzerland) EV Zug
47	F	Jael Manetsch	1.64 m (5 ft 5 in)	64 kg (141 lb)	3 September 2007 (aged 19)	(Switzerland) EV Zug
68	F	Leoni Balzer	1.65 m (5 ft 5 in)	64 kg (141 lb)	18 January 2006 (aged 20)	(Switzerland) HC Davos
72	F	Luisa Waser	1.59 m (5 ft 3 in)	52 kg (115 lb)	18 August 2000 (aged 26)	(Switzerland) EV Zug
73	F	Norina Müller	1.62 m (5 ft 4 in)	53 kg (117 lb)	24 August 2008 (aged 18)	(Switzerland) Fribourg HC
76	D	Lucienne Tenenbaum	1.78 m (5 ft 10 in)	75 kg (165 lb)	21 April 2006 (aged 20)	(United States) Minnesota State Mavericks
77	D	Nina Harju	1.70 m (5 ft 7 in)	72 kg (159 lb)	14 June 2004 (aged 22)	(Switzerland) EV Zug
82	D	Alessia Baechler – A	1.74 m (5 ft 9 in)	68 kg (150 lb)	7 September 2005 (aged 21)	(United States) Northeastern Huskies
86	F	Ilana Leibundgut	1.74 m (5 ft 9 in)	71 kg (157 lb)	9 January 2007 (aged 19)	(Switzerland) HC Davos
94	F	Alena Rossel	1.71 m (5 ft 7 in)	64 kg (141 lb)	8 June 2006 (aged 20)	(Switzerland) HC Davos

=== United States ===
The roster was announced on 31 October 2026.

Head Coach: John Wroblewski

No.	Pos.	Name	Height	Weight	Birthdate	Team
2	D	Lee Stecklein	1.83 m (6 ft 0 in)	80 kg (180 lb)	23 April 1994 (aged 32)	(United States) Minnesota Frost
3	D	Cayla Barnes	1.57 m (5 ft 2 in)	68 kg (150 lb)	7 January 1999 (aged 27)	(United States) Detroit Clutch
4	D	Caroline Harvey	1.79 m (5 ft 10 in)	70 kg (150 lb)	14 October 2002 (aged 24)	(Canada) Vancouver Goldeneyes
5	D	Megan Keller – A	1.80 m (5 ft 11 in)	75 kg (165 lb)	1 May 1996 (aged 30)	(United States) Boston Fleet
6	D	Rory Guilday	1.78 m (5 ft 10 in)	73 kg (161 lb)	7 September 2002 (aged 24)	(United States) San Jose Sea Lions
7	F	Lacey Eden	1.73 m (5 ft 8 in)	72 kg (159 lb)	2 May 2002 (aged 24)	(United States) Vegas Vanguards
8	D	Haley Winn	1.67 m (5 ft 6 in)	68 kg (150 lb)	14 July 2003 (aged 23)	(United States) Boston Fleet
9	F	Kirsten Simms	1.65 m (5 ft 5 in)	67 kg (148 lb)	31 August 2004 (aged 22)	(Canada) Toronto Sceptres
10	D	Laila Edwards	1.85 m (6 ft 1 in)	90 kg (200 lb)	25 January 2004 (aged 22)	(United States) San Jose Sea Lions
11	D	Emma Peschel	1.78 m (5 ft 10 in)	82 kg (181 lb)	20 January 2004 (aged 22)	(United States) New York Sirens
12	F	Kelly Pannek	1.70 m (5 ft 7 in)	78 kg (172 lb)	29 December 1995 (aged 30)	(United States) Minnesota Frost
13	F	Grace Zumwinkle	1.80 m (5 ft 11 in)	75 kg (165 lb)	23 April 1999 (aged 27)	(United States) Minnesota Frost
16	F	Hayley Scamurra	1.72 m (5 ft 8 in)	82 kg (181 lb)	14 December 1994 (aged 31)	(United States) Vegas Vanguards
18	F	Jesse Compher	1.78 m (5 ft 10 in)	66 kg (146 lb)	1 July 1999 (aged 27)	(United States) Detroit Clutch
21	F	Hilary Knight – C	1.78 m (5 ft 10 in)	79 kg (174 lb)	12 July 1989 (aged 37)	(United States) Detroit Clutch
22	F	Tessa Janecke	1.73 m (5 ft 8 in)	72 kg (159 lb)	12 May 2004 (aged 22)	(United States) Vegas Vanguards
23	F	Hannah Bilka	1.64 m (5 ft 5 in)	65 kg (143 lb)	24 March 2001 (aged 25)	(United States) Detroit Clutch
24	F	Joy Dunne	1.80 m (5 ft 11 in)	84 kg (185 lb)	13 June 2005 (aged 21)	(United States) Ohio State University
25	F	Alex Carpenter – A	1.65 m (5 ft 5 in)	68 kg (150 lb)	13 April 1994 (aged 32)	(United States) Seattle Torrent
27	F	Taylor Fox	1.78 m (5 ft 10 in)	74 kg (163 lb)	17 March 2000 (aged 26)	(United States) Minnesota Frost
31	G	Aerin Frankel	1.64 m (5 ft 5 in)	65 kg (143 lb)	24 May 1999 (aged 27)	(United States) Boston Fleet
32	F	Casey O'Brien	1.63 m (5 ft 4 in)	61 kg (134 lb)	21 August 2001 (aged 25)	(United States) New York Sirens
33	G	Gwyneth Philips	1.65 m (5 ft 5 in)	68 kg (150 lb)	17 September 2000 (aged 26)	(Canada) Ottawa Charge
35	G	Callie Shanahan	1.77 m (5 ft 10 in)	79 kg (174 lb)	26 May 2003 (aged 23)	(United States) New York Sirens
37	F	Abbey Murphy	1.64 m (5 ft 5 in)	68 kg (150 lb)	14 April 2002 (aged 24)	(United States) Seattle Torrent

== Group B ==
=== Canada ===
The roster was announced on 19 October 2026.

Head Coach: Kori Cheverie

No.	Pos.	Name	Height	Weight	Birthdate	Team
2	D	Sophie Jaques	1.72 m (5 ft 8 in)	81 kg (179 lb)	16 October 2000 (aged 26)	(Canada) Vancouver Goldeneyes
4	D	Kati Tabin	1.70 m (5 ft 7 in)	70 kg (150 lb)	21 April 1997 (aged 29)	(Canada) Montreal Victoire
5	D	Kendall Cooper	1.75 m (5 ft 9 in)	74 kg (163 lb)	19 May 2002 (aged 24)	(United States) Vegas Vanguards
7	F	Laura Stacey – C	1.80 m (5 ft 11 in)	70 kg (150 lb)	5 May 1994 (aged 32)	(Canada) Montreal Victoire
8	D	Chloe Primerano	1.72 m (5 ft 8 in)	74 kg (163 lb)	2 January 2007 (aged 19)	(United States) Minnesota Golden Gophers
9	F	Jessie Eldridge	1.76 m (5 ft 9 in)	79 kg (174 lb)	17 December 1997 (aged 28)	(Canada) Montreal Victoire
10	F	Sarah Fillier	1.68 m (5 ft 6 in)	74 kg (163 lb)	9 June 2000 (aged 26)	(United States) New York Sirens
11	F	Caitlin Kraemer	1.79 m (5 ft 10 in)	76 kg (168 lb)	29 May 2006 (aged 20)	(United States) Minnesota Duluth Bulldogs
13	F	Sara Manness	1.77 m (5 ft 10 in)	74 kg (163 lb)	26 September 2007 (aged 19)	(United States) Clarkson Golden Knights
14	D	Renata Fast – C	1.70 m (5 ft 7 in)	70 kg (150 lb)	6 October 1994 (aged 32)	(Canada) Toronto Sceptres
16	F	Rosalie Tremblay	1.73 m (5 ft 8 in)	67 kg (148 lb)	16 September 2008 (aged 18)	(United States) Wisconsin Badgers
17	D	Ella Shelton	1.73 m (5 ft 8 in)	78 kg (172 lb)	19 January 1998 (aged 28)	(Canada) Toronto Sceptres
22	F	Hayley McDonald	1.79 m (5 ft 10 in)	77 kg (170 lb)	7 January 2008 (aged 18)	(United States) Ohio State Buckeyes
23	D	Erin Ambrose	1.62 m (5 ft 4 in)	70 kg (150 lb)	30 April 1994 (aged 32)	(United States) Vegas Vanguards
26	F	Emily Clark	1.72 m (5 ft 8 in)	70 kg (150 lb)	28 November 1995 (aged 30)	(Canada) Hamilton Havoc
27	F	Emma Maltais	1.60 m (5 ft 3 in)	70 kg (150 lb)	4 November 1999 (aged 27)	(Canada) Montreal Victoire
35	G	Ann-Renée Desbiens	1.76 m (5 ft 9 in)	77 kg (170 lb)	10 April 1994 (aged 32)	(Canada) Montreal Victoire
37	G	Ève Gascon	1.73 m (5 ft 8 in)	80 kg (180 lb)	9 May 2003 (aged 23)	(United States) Minnesota Duluth Bulldogs
43	F	Kristin O'Neill – A	1.63 m (5 ft 4 in)	60 kg (130 lb)	30 March 1998 (aged 28)	(United States) San Jose Sea Lions
61	D	Nicole Gosling	1.70 m (5 ft 7 in)	78 kg (172 lb)	21 April 2002 (aged 24)	(Canada) Hamilton Havoc
63	F	Sarah Wozniewicz	1.73 m (5 ft 8 in)	72 kg (159 lb)	25 August 2003 (aged 23)	(Canada) Ottawa Charge
82	G	Kayle Osborne	1.72 m (5 ft 8 in)	79 kg (174 lb)	28 February 2002 (aged 24)	(Canada) Hamilton Havoc
91	F	Rebecca Leslie	1.67 m (5 ft 6 in)	63 kg (139 lb)	8 May 1996 (aged 30)	(Canada) Ottawa Charge
92	F	Danielle Serdachny	1.76 m (5 ft 9 in)	72 kg (159 lb)	12 May 2001 (aged 25)	(United States) Seattle Torrent
95	F	Daryl Watts	1.68 m (5 ft 6 in)	68 kg (150 lb)	15 May 1999 (aged 27)	(United States) Detroit Clutch

=== Denmark ===
The roster was announced on 29 October 2026.

Head coach: (Sweden) Björn Edlund

No.	Pos.	Name	Height	Weight	Birthdate	Team
1	G	Aya Petersen	1.78 m (5 ft 10 in)	83 kg (183 lb)	19 January 2004 (aged 22)	(Sweden) Malmö Redhawks
4	F	Silke Glud	1.75 m (5 ft 9 in)	65 kg (143 lb)	3 March 1996 (aged 30)	(Sweden) Malmö Redhawks
5	D	Sille Flygenring	1.70 m (5 ft 7 in)	56 kg (123 lb)	10 December 2001 (aged 24)	(Denmark) Hvidovre IF
6	D	Lærke Søndergaard	1.80 m (5 ft 11 in)	82 kg (181 lb)	5 January 2004 (aged 22)	(Austria) Lakers Kärnten
7	D	Freya Ekberg	1.63 m (5 ft 4 in)	60 kg (130 lb)	12 May 2009 (aged 17)	(Canada) Purcell HA
9	F	Alma Madsen-Mygdal	1.67 m (5 ft 6 in)	55 kg (121 lb)	31 October 2007 (aged 19)	(Denmark) Hvidovre IF
10	D	Silja Rasmussen	1.75 m (5 ft 9 in)	69 kg (152 lb)	16 February 2007 (aged 19)	(Sweden) Malmö Redhawks
11	D	Klara Holm	1.73 m (5 ft 8 in)	69 kg (152 lb)	29 July 2007 (aged 19)	(Denmark) Hvidovre IF
12	F	Mille Sørensen – A	1.56 m (5 ft 1 in)	62 kg (137 lb)	17 December 2001 (aged 24)	(Sweden) Leksands IF
13	F	Frida Kielstrup	1.55 m (5 ft 1 in)	63 kg (139 lb)	21 March 2005 (aged 21)	(Denmark) Hvidovre IF
14	F	Nicoline Jensen – C	1.65 m (5 ft 5 in)	65 kg (143 lb)	8 November 1992 (aged 33)	(Sweden) Malmö Redhawks
17	F	Frederikke Foss	1.72 m (5 ft 8 in)	72 kg (159 lb)	12 February 2005 (aged 21)	(Canada) UNB Reds
18	F	Maria Peters	1.68 m (5 ft 6 in)	60 kg (130 lb)	16 August 1999 (aged 27)	(Denmark) Odense IK
19	D	Josephine Asperup – A	1.63 m (5 ft 4 in)	65 kg (143 lb)	21 July 1992 (aged 34)	(Sweden) Malmö Redhawks
20	F	Teresa Christensen	1.65 m (5 ft 5 in)	54 kg (119 lb)	17 April 2009 (aged 17)	(Canada) OHA Mavericks
21	D	Olivia Ranum	1.69 m (5 ft 7 in)	60 kg (130 lb)	18 May 2008 (aged 18)	(Sweden) Rögle BK
22	D	Sofie Skott	1.72 m (5 ft 8 in)	62 kg (137 lb)	14 June 2002 (aged 24)	(Germany) Mad Dogs Mannheim
23	F	Julie Oksbjerg	1.78 m (5 ft 10 in)	68 kg (150 lb)	2 December 2000 (aged 25)	(Denmark) Odense IK
24	F	Julie Henriksen	1.57 m (5 ft 2 in)	68 kg (150 lb)	30 September 2001 (aged 25)	(Denmark) Hvidovre IF
26	F	Nikita Bergmann	1.80 m (5 ft 11 in)	63 kg (139 lb)	25 August 2008 (aged 18)	(Sweden) Skellefteå AIK
29	F	Sarah Stauning	1.72 m (5 ft 8 in)	70 kg (150 lb)	2 August 2004 (aged 22)	(Sweden) Malmö Redhawks
30	G	Caroline Bjergstad	1.65 m (5 ft 5 in)	60 kg (130 lb)	9 March 2005 (aged 21)	(United States) RPI Engineers
33	G	Emma-Sofie Nordstrøm	1.77 m (5 ft 10 in)	71 kg (157 lb)	5 November 2002 (aged 24)	(Canada) Hamilton Havoc
61	F	Michele Brix Nielsen	1.69 m (5 ft 7 in)	75 kg (165 lb)	10 July 1996 (aged 30)	(Denmark) Odense IK

=== Finland ===
The roster was announced on 31 October 2026.

Head coach: Tero Lehterä

No.	Pos.	Name	Height	Weight	Birthdate	Team
1	G	Sanni Ahola	1.71 m (5 ft 7 in)	78 kg (172 lb)	3 June 2000 (aged 26)	(Canada) Ottawa Charge
5	D	Siiri Yrjölä	1.66 m (5 ft 5 in)	69 kg (152 lb)	8 September 2004 (aged 22)	(United States) St. Cloud State Huskies
6	D	Jenni Hiirikoski – C	1.61 m (5 ft 3 in)	62 kg (137 lb)	30 March 1987 (aged 39)	(Sweden) Luleå HF
7	D	Sanni Rantala	1.73 m (5 ft 8 in)	65 kg (143 lb)	8 July 2002 (aged 24)	(Sweden) Frölunda HC
9	D	Nelli Laitinen – A	1.68 m (5 ft 6 in)	64 kg (141 lb)	29 April 2002 (aged 24)	(Canada) Hamilton Havoc
10	F	Elisa Holopainen	1.66 m (5 ft 5 in)	58 kg (128 lb)	27 December 2001 (aged 24)	(United States) New York Sirens
11	D	Oona Koukkula	1.66 m (5 ft 5 in)	65 kg (143 lb)	22 August 2003 (aged 23)	(Sweden) Brynäs IF
12	F	Sanni Vanhanen	1.68 m (5 ft 6 in)	67 kg (148 lb)	1 July 2005 (aged 21)	(United States) Ohio State Buckeyes
14	D	Krista Parkkonen	1.68 m (5 ft 6 in)	64 kg (141 lb)	25 June 2002 (aged 24)	(Sweden) Färjestad BK
15	F	Emmi Juusela	1.67 m (5 ft 6 in)	67 kg (148 lb)	13 February 2003 (aged 23)	(Sweden) SDE HF
16	F	Petra Nieminen	1.69 m (5 ft 7 in)	73 kg (161 lb)	4 May 1999 (aged 27)	(Canada) Montreal Victoire
18	F	Jenniina Nylund	1.71 m (5 ft 7 in)	62 kg (137 lb)	18 June 1999 (aged 27)	(Sweden) Brynäs IF
20	F	Sofia Nuutinen	1.71 m (5 ft 7 in)	68 kg (150 lb)	14 June 2002 (aged 24)	(United States) Mercyhurst Lakers
22	F	Julia Schalin	1.60 m (5 ft 3 in)	65 kg (143 lb)	31 August 2005 (aged 21)	(United States) Minnesota Golden Gophers
24	F	Viivi Vainikka	1.66 m (5 ft 5 in)	66 kg (146 lb)	23 December 2001 (aged 24)	(United States) Minnesota Frost
30	G	Emilia Kyrkkö	1.69 m (5 ft 7 in)	75 kg (165 lb)	24 February 2004 (aged 22)	(United States) St. Cloud State Huskies
33	F	Michelle Karvinen	1.66 m (5 ft 5 in)	65 kg (143 lb)	27 March 1990 (aged 36)	(Canada) Montreal Victoire
34	F	Sofianna Sundelin	1.69 m (5 ft 7 in)	61 kg (134 lb)	13 January 2003 (aged 23)	(United States) St. Cloud State Huskies
35	G	Kerttu Kuja-Halkola	1.76 m (5 ft 9 in)	72 kg (159 lb)	2 September 2007 (aged 19)	(Finland) IFK Helsinki
40	F	Noora Tulus – A	1.65 m (5 ft 5 in)	64 kg (141 lb)	15 August 1995 (aged 31)	(Sweden) Brynäs IF
45	D	Nella Berg	1.75 m (5 ft 9 in)	72 kg (159 lb)	10 February 2005 (aged 21)	(Sweden) Luleå HF
46	D	Tuuli Tallinen	1.77 m (5 ft 10 in)	75 kg (165 lb)	10 June 2006 (aged 20)	(United States) Minnesota Duluth Bulldogs
61	F	Emma Nuutinen	1.77 m (5 ft 10 in)	75 kg (165 lb)	7 December 1996 (aged 29)	(United States) Seattle Torrent
77	F	Susanna Tapani	1.77 m (5 ft 10 in)	70 kg (150 lb)	2 March 1993 (aged 33)	(United States) Boston Fleet
91	F	Julia Liikala	1.66 m (5 ft 5 in)	58 kg (128 lb)	20 March 2001 (aged 25)	(Sweden) Frölunda HC

=== Japan ===
The roster was announced on 21 October 2026.

Head coach: Tomohito Okubo

No.	Pos.	Name	Height	Weight	Birthdate	Team
2	D	Natsuki Okumura	1.76 m (5 ft 9 in)	70 kg (150 lb)	14 May 2006 (aged 20)	(Japan) Toyota Cygnus
4	D	Ayaka Tomiuchi	1.58 m (5 ft 2 in)	59 kg (130 lb)	24 April 2003 (aged 23)	(Japan) Daishin IHC
5	D	Shiori Yamashita	1.58 m (5 ft 2 in)	59 kg (130 lb)	28 April 2002 (aged 24)	(Japan) Seibu Princess Rabbits
6	D	Kika Terauchi	1.66 m (5 ft 5 in)	75 kg (165 lb)	2 June 2008 (aged 18)	(Canada) Mississauga Jr. Hurricanes
8	D	Kohane Sato – A	1.64 m (5 ft 5 in)	62 kg (137 lb)	16 March 2006 (aged 20)	(Japan) Daishin IHC
9	D	An Shinoda	1.64 m (5 ft 5 in)	63 kg (139 lb)	3 July 2004 (aged 22)	(Japan) Mikage Gretz
10	F	Hikaru Yamashita	1.57 m (5 ft 2 in)	53 kg (117 lb)	23 September 2000 (aged 26)	(Japan) Seibu Princess Rabbits
11	F	Akane Shiga	1.65 m (5 ft 5 in)	64 kg (141 lb)	3 March 2001 (aged 25)	(United States) Detroit Clutch
13	F	Yumeka Wajima	1.56 m (5 ft 1 in)	49 kg (108 lb)	19 October 2002 (aged 24)	(Japan) DK Peregrine
17	F	Wakana Kurosu	1.61 m (5 ft 3 in)	62 kg (137 lb)	3 June 2000 (aged 26)	(Japan) DK Peregrine
18	F	Ai Tada	1.58 m (5 ft 2 in)	61 kg (134 lb)	4 April 2006 (aged 20)	(Japan) Daishin IHC
19	F	Makoto Ito	1.69 m (5 ft 7 in)	74 kg (163 lb)	2 May 2004 (aged 22)	(Japan) Toyota Cygnus
20	G	Miyuu Masuhara	1.57 m (5 ft 2 in)	53 kg (117 lb)	4 October 2004 (aged 22)	(Austria) Sabres St. Pölten
21	F	Marin Nagaoka	1.58 m (5 ft 2 in)	63 kg (139 lb)	27 July 2002 (aged 24)	(Japan) Seibu Princess Rabbits
24	D	Kanami Seki – A	1.68 m (5 ft 6 in)	66 kg (146 lb)	23 June 2000 (aged 26)	(Finland) TPS
27	F	Remi Koyama	1.47 m (4 ft 10 in)	52 kg (115 lb)	17 July 2000 (aged 26)	(Japan) Seibu Princess Rabbits
30	G	Rei Halloran	1.70 m (5 ft 7 in)	65 kg (143 lb)	22 March 2001 (aged 25)	(Sweden) Timrå IK
31	G	Riko Kawaguchi	1.66 m (5 ft 5 in)	64 kg (141 lb)	19 September 2004 (aged 22)	(Japan) Daishin IHC
40	F	Rio Noro	1.64 m (5 ft 5 in)	61 kg (134 lb)	15 May 2004 (aged 22)	(Japan) Daishin IHC
41	F	Riri Noro	1.61 m (5 ft 3 in)	58 kg (128 lb)	15 May 2004 (aged 22)	(Japan) Daishin IHC
72	D	Aoi Shiga – C	1.65 m (5 ft 5 in)	61 kg (134 lb)	4 July 1999 (aged 27)	(Sweden) Luleå HF
73	F	Hinata Lack	1.58 m (5 ft 2 in)	54 kg (119 lb)	19 December 2003 (aged 22)	(Japan) DK Peregrine
91	F	Umeka Odaira	1.62 m (5 ft 4 in)	56 kg (123 lb)	12 December 2008 (aged 17)	(Canada) North York Storm

=== Sweden ===
The roster was announced on 20 October 2026.

Head coach: Erika Holst

No.	Pos.	Name	Height	Weight	Birthdate	Team
1	G	Ebba Svensson Träff	1.66 m (5 ft 5 in)	70 kg (150 lb)	27 November 2004 (aged 21)	(Sweden) Linköping HC
7	D	Mira Jungåker – A	1.73 m (5 ft 8 in)	70 kg (150 lb)	22 July 2005 (aged 21)	(United States) Ohio State Buckeyes
8	F	Hilda Svensson	1.70 m (5 ft 7 in)	67 kg (148 lb)	24 August 2006 (aged 20)	(United States) Ohio State Buckeyes
11	F	Josefin Bouveng	1.75 m (5 ft 9 in)	68 kg (150 lb)	15 May 2001 (aged 25)	(United States) Vegas Vanguards
12	D	Maja Nylén Persson	1.63 m (5 ft 4 in)	63 kg (139 lb)	20 November 2000 (aged 25)	(United States) New York Sirens
13	F	Wilma Sundin	1.65 m (5 ft 5 in)	60 kg (130 lb)	24 September 2003 (aged 23)	(Sweden) Brynäs IF
14	D	Ida Karlsson	1.78 m (5 ft 10 in)	68 kg (150 lb)	30 June 2004 (aged 22)	(United States) Minnesota Duluth Bulldogs
15	F	Lisa Johansson	1.61 m (5 ft 3 in)	58 kg (128 lb)	11 April 1992 (aged 34)	(Sweden) Frölunda HC
16	F	Tilde Grillfors	1.65 m (5 ft 5 in)	71 kg (157 lb)	3 July 2008 (aged 18)	(Sweden) Brynäs IF
17	F	Sofie Lundin	1.64 m (5 ft 5 in)	63 kg (139 lb)	15 February 2000 (aged 26)	(Sweden) Frölunda HC
19	F	Sara Hjalmarsson	1.76 m (5 ft 9 in)	77 kg (170 lb)	8 February 1998 (aged 28)	(Canada) Toronto Sceptres
21	D	Lova Blom	1.69 m (5 ft 7 in)	75 kg (165 lb)	15 July 2003 (aged 23)	(Sweden) Brynäs IF
22	F	Hanna Thuvik	1.70 m (5 ft 7 in)	75 kg (165 lb)	17 May 2002 (aged 24)	(Sweden) Brynäs IF
23	F	Thea Johansson – A	1.71 m (5 ft 7 in)	68 kg (150 lb)	22 November 2002 (aged 23)	(Sweden) HV71
24	F	Ebba Hedqvist	1.68 m (5 ft 6 in)	66 kg (146 lb)	30 September 2006 (aged 20)	(Sweden) Luleå HF
25	F	Lina Ljungblom	1.67 m (5 ft 6 in)	79 kg (174 lb)	15 October 2001 (aged 25)	(Canada) Montreal Victoire
30	G	Emma Söderberg	1.71 m (5 ft 7 in)	69 kg (152 lb)	18 February 1998 (aged 28)	(Sweden) SDE HF
31	G	Ida Boman	1.69 m (5 ft 7 in)	58 kg (128 lb)	1 April 2003 (aged 23)	(Sweden) Färjestad BK
34	F	Mira Hallin	1.67 m (5 ft 6 in)	61 kg (134 lb)	24 April 2006 (aged 20)	(Sweden) MoDo Hockey
37	D	Josefine Holmgren	1.75 m (5 ft 9 in)	74 kg (163 lb)	4 November 1993 (aged 33)	(Sweden) SDE HF
55	D	Jenna Raunio	1.74 m (5 ft 9 in)	70 kg (150 lb)	24 September 2006 (aged 20)	(United States) Ohio State Buckeyes
67	F	Michelle Löwenhielm	1.73 m (5 ft 8 in)	73 kg (161 lb)	22 March 1995 (aged 31)	(Sweden) Linköping HC
71	D	Anna Kjellbin – C	1.69 m (5 ft 7 in)	63 kg (139 lb)	16 March 1994 (aged 32)	(Canada) Hamilton Havoc
89	F	Nicole Hall	1.68 m (5 ft 6 in)	73 kg (161 lb)	24 March 2004 (aged 22)	(United States) Penn State Nittany Lions
