= Haley Skarupa =

American ice hockey player

Haley Rae Skarupa
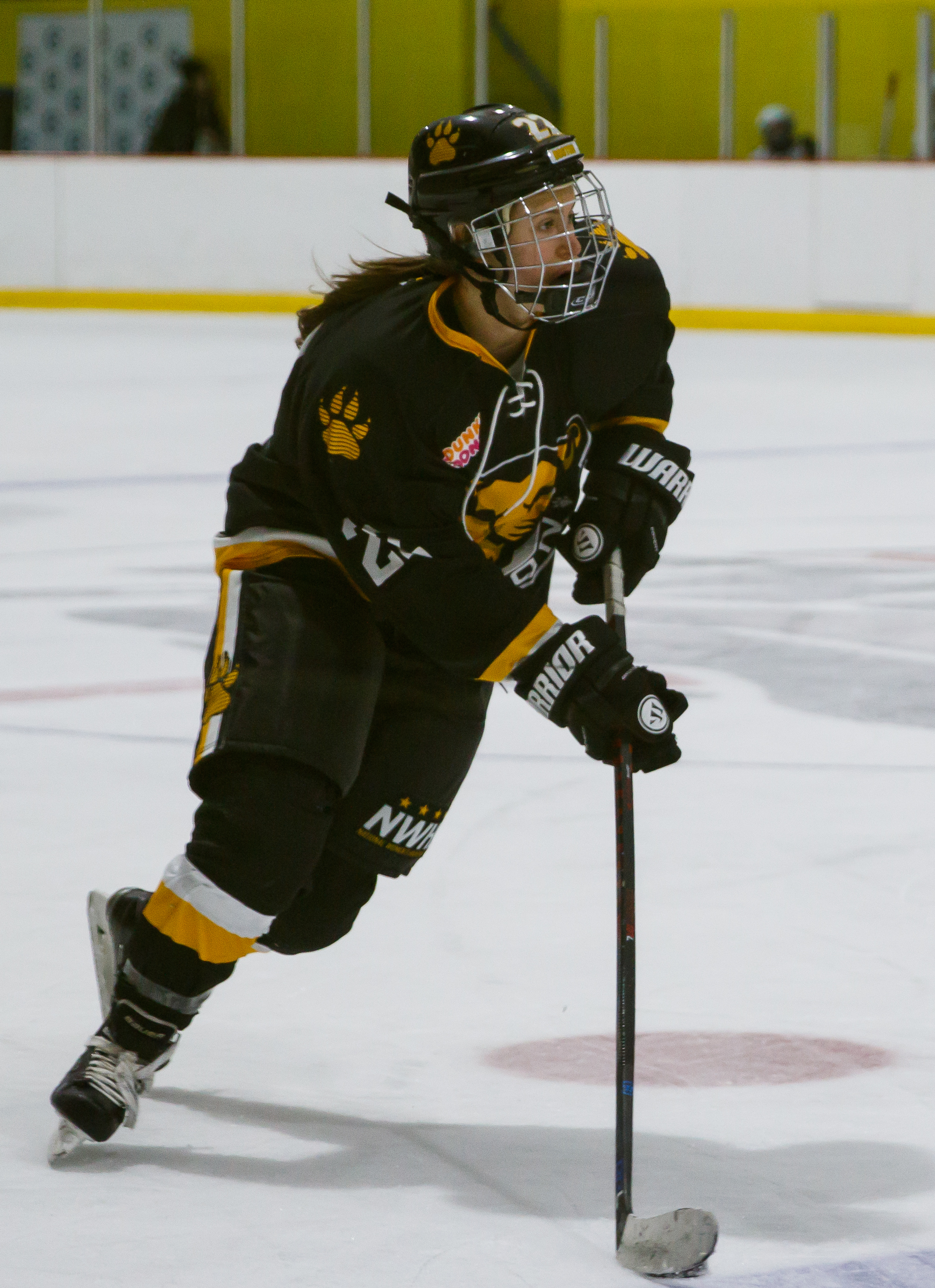
- Skarupa with the Boston Pride in 2017
- Born: January 3, 1994 (age 32) Rockville, Maryland, U.S.
- Height: 5 ft 6 in (168 cm)
- Weight: 141 lb (64 kg; 10 st 1 lb)
- Position: Forward
- Shot: Right
- Played for: Connecticut Whale; Boston Pride; PWHPA
- National team: United States
- Playing career: 2012–2023
Medal record
Olympic Games
Gold medal – first place	2018 Pyeongchang	Team
World Championships
Gold medal – first place	2015 Sweden
Gold medal – first place	2016 Canada
Gold medal – first place	2017 United States
World U18 Championships
Gold medal – first place	2011 Sweden
Silver medal – second place	2010 United States
Silver medal – second place	2012 Czech Republic

Haley Rae Skarupa (born January 3, 1994) is an American former professional ice hockey player. A forward, she played in the National Women's Hockey League and Professional Women's Hockey Players Association, and for the American national team.

== Playing career ==
Skarupa played under-19 hockey for the Washington Pride of the Junior Women's Hockey League. In her junior and senior years of high school, she captained the team and won the Liz Turgeon Player of the Year award.

After graduating, Skarupa matriculated at Boston College, where her parents had studied. Across four seasons in the NCAA, she scored 244 points in 144 games, becoming the second-highest scorer in Boston College history among men and women. She was a finalist for the Patty Kazmaier Memorial Award in 2015 and 2016.

Skarupa was drafted fifth overall, in the second round of the 2015 NWHL Draft by the New York Riveters. On April 26, 2016, Skarupa's signing rights were traded to the Connecticut Whale in exchange for Michelle Picard.

Across three seasons in the National Women's Hockey League (NWHL), Skarupa recorded 45 points in 34 games, and was named to the 2017 NWHL All-Star Game.

In May 2019, Skarupa joined the Professional Women's Hockey Players Association (PWHPA) boycott of the NWHL. A few months later, she was hired as a hockey ambassador with the Washington Capitals of the NHL. She played at PWHPA events from 2020 to 2023.

Skarupa announced her retirement as a player on March 16, 2023.

== International play ==
Skarupa made her international debut at the 2010 IIHF World Women's U18 Championship, winning silver. She returned for the 2011 championship, where she recorded 8 points including a hat-trick in a 14–1 gold medal victory over the Czech Republic.

At the 2012 IIHF World Women's U18 Championship, Skarupa set a single-tournament record of 11 goals and helped Team USA win a silver medal. Her single-tournament record was broken by Jane Daley in 2026.

Skarupa participated at the 2015 IIHF Women's World Championship, as well as the 2016 and 2017 World Championships, winning gold each time.

Skarupa represented the United States at the 2018 Winter Olympics.

== Post-playing career ==
On October 19, 2023, USA Hockey announced that they had hired Skarupa as head scout of the U.S. Women's National Team program. In November 2024, the PWHL announced that the Minnesota Frost hired Skarupa as their East Coast and International Scout.

== Personal life ==
Skarupa was raised in Rockville, Maryland, and she graduated from Wootton High School.

== Career statistics ==
=== Regular season and playoffs ===
			Regular season					Playoffs
Season	Team	League	GP	G	A	Pts	PIM	GP	G	A	Pts	PIM
2010–11	Washington Pride	JWHL	23	41	19	60	14	—	—	—	—	—
2011–12	Washington Pride	JWHL	27	74	15	89	48	—	—	—	—	—
2012–13	Boston College	HE	33	24	29	53	10	—	—	—	—	—
2013–14	Boston College	HE	33	25	16	41	12	—	—	—	—	—
2014–15	Boston College	HE	37	31	40	71	11	—	—	—	—	—
2015–16	Boston College	HE	41	35	44	79	8	—	—	—	—	—
2016–17	Connecticut Whale	NWHL	16	11	11	22	0	1	0	2	2	2
2017–18	Boston Pride	NWHL	5	2	3	5	2	—	—	—	—	—
2018–19	Boston Pride	NWHL	13	6	12	18	6	1	0	0	0	0
2020–21	New Hampshire	PWHPA	5	2	4	6	4	—	—	—	—	—
2022–23	Team Sonnet	PWHPA	11	2	0	2	4	—	—	—	—	—
NWHL totals			34	19	26	45	8	2	0	2	2	2
PWHPA totals			16	4	4	8	8	—	—	—	—	—

=== International ===
Year	Team	Event	Result	GP	G	A	Pts	PIM
2010	United States	U18	2nd place, silver medalist(s)	5	3	6	9	0
2011	United States	U18	1st place, gold medalist(s)	5	3	5	8	0
2012	United States	U18	2nd place, silver medalist(s)	5	11	0	11	0
2015	United States	WC	1st place, gold medalist(s)	5	2	2	4	0
2016	United States	WC	1st place, gold medalist(s)	5	0	3	3	0
2017	United States	WC	1st place, gold medalist(s)	5	1	1	2	0
2022	United States	OG	1st place, gold medalist(s)	5	0	0	0	0
Junior totals				15	17	11	28	0
Senior totals				20	3	6	9	0

== Awards and honors ==
Award	Year	Ref
JWHL
Liz Turgeon Player of the Year	2011, 2012	
NCAA
Third Team All-USCHO.com	2014	
Second Team All-USCHO.com	2015	
First Team All-USCHO.com	2016	
Second Team AHCA All-American	2016	
Hockey East
Rookie of the Year	2013	
All-Rookie Team	2013	
Second All-Star Team	2013, 2015	
First All-Star Team	2014, 2016	
NWHL
All-Star Game	2017	
