= Jane Daley =

American ice hockey player (born 2009)

- Born: March 21, 2009 (age 17) Medfield, Massachusetts, U.S.
- Height: 5 ft 5 in (165 cm)
- Weight: 134 lb (61 kg; 9 st 8 lb)
- Position: Forward
- Shoots: Left
- USHS team: Shattuck-Saint Mary's

Jane Daley (born March 21, 2009) is an American ice hockey player for Shattuck-Saint Mary's. At the 2026 IIHF U18 Women's World Championship she broke the single-tournament goal-scoring record previously held by Haley Skarupa.

== Playing career ==
Daley attends Shattuck-Saint Mary's in Faribault, Minnesota. During the 2024–25 season, she recorded 38 goals and 51 assists in 37 games. During the 2025–26 season, she recorded 25 goals and 51 assists in 39 games.

== International play ==
Medal record

Representing United States

Ice hockey

World U18 Championships
Gold medal – first place	2026 Canada	
Silver medal – second place	2025 Finland	

On November 13, 2024, Daley was selected to represent the United States at the 2025 IIHF U18 Women's World Championship. During the tournament she recorded four assists in six games and won a silver medal.

On October 31, 2025, she was again selected to compete at the 2026 IIHF U18 Women's World Championship. On January 10, 2026, during the first preliminary round game against Slovakia, she recorded a hat-trick in a 13–0 victory. The next day against Czechia she recorded her second consecutive hat-trick in a 9–1 victory. On January 13, 2026, during the final preliminary round game against Finland, she recorded her third consecutive hat-trick in a 14–0 victory. During the quarterfinals against Hungary she scored two goals in a 9–0 victory. With her 11 goals, she tied the single-tournament goal scoring record set by Haley Skarupa in 2012. During the semifinals against Sweden she scored one goal in a 9–1 victory and set a new single-tournament goal scoring record. She led the tournament in points with 12 goals and five assists in six games and won a gold medal. She was subsequently named tournament MVP, the best forward by the IIHF directorate, and named to the media all-star team.

== Career statistics ==
Year	Team	Event	Result	GP	G	A	Pts	PIM
2025	United States	U18	2nd place, silver medalist(s)	6	0	4	4	4
2026	United States	U18	1st place, gold medalist(s)	6	12	5	17	2
Junior totals				12	12	9	21	6

== Awards and honors ==
Award	Year	Ref
International
IIHF U18 Women's World Championship best forward	2026	
IIHF U18 Women's World Championship Most Valuable Player	2026	
IIHF U18 Women's World Championship Media All-Star team	2026	
