= Ellen Jarabková =

Czech ice hockey player (born 2009)

- Born: 21 January 2009 (age 17) Hořovice, Czech Republic
- Height: 5 ft 9 in (175 cm)
- Weight: 159 lb (72 kg; 11 st 5 lb)
- Position: Defense
- Shoots: Left
- SDHL team: Modo Hockey
- National team: Czech Republic
- Playing career: 2026–present

Ellen Jarabková (born 21 January 2009) is a Czech professional ice hockey player for Modo Hockey of the Swedish Women's Hockey League (SDHL) and a member of Czechia women's national ice hockey team.

== Playing career ==
Jarabková began her ice hockey career for HC Hvězda Praha. In June 2026, she joined Modo Hockey of the Swedish Women's Hockey League (SDHL) for the 2026–27 season.

== International play ==
Medal record

Representing Czech Republic

World U18 Championship
| Silver medal – second place | 2024 Switzerland | |
| Bronze medal – third place | 2025 Finland | |
| Bronze medal – third place | 2026 Canada | |

Jarabková made her IIHF U18 Women's World Championship debut for Czechia during the 2024 IIHF U18 Women's World Championship and won a silver medal at 14 years old. She again represented the Czech Republic at the 2025 IIHF U18 Women's World Championship and won a bronze medal.

In February 2025, she represented the Czech Republic at the European Youth Olympic Winter Festival, where she led the team in scoring with three goals and five assists in four games and won a gold medal.

On 31 December 2025, she was again selected to represent the Czech Republic at the 2026 IIHF U18 Women's World Championship. During the tournament she recorded one goal and four assists in six games and won a bronze medal.

In August 2026, she was named to the roster for Czechia at the 2026–27 Women's Euro Hockey Tour. She made her senior national team debut on 30 September 2026, against Finland and scored her first goal on 3 October 2026 against Switzerland.

On 1 November 2026, she was named to the roster for Czechia at the 2026 IIHF Women's World Championship. At 17 years old, she is the youngest player on the team.

== Career statistics ==
| Year | Team | Event | Result | GP | G | A | Pts | PIM |
|---|---|---|---|---|---|---|---|---|
| 2024 | Czechia | U18 | 2nd place, silver medalist(s) | 6 | 0 | 0 | 0 | 0 |
| 2025 | Czechia | U18 | 3rd place, bronze medalist(s) | 6 | 0 | 4 | 4 | 2 |
| 2026 | Czechia | U18 | 3rd place, bronze medalist(s) | 6 | 1 | 4 | 5 | 6 |
| Junior totals | | | | 18 | 1 | 8 | 9 | 8 |
