= Adrianna Milani =

Canadian ice hockey forward (born 2009)

- Born: March 19, 2009 (age 17) Oakville, Ontario, Canada
- Height: 5 ft 4 in (163 cm)
- Weight: 152 lb (69 kg; 10 st 12 lb)
- Position: Forward
- Shoots: Right
- National team: Canada
Medal record
Women's ice hockey
World U18 Championships
Silver medal – second place	2026

Adrianna Milani (born March 19, 2009) is a Canadian ice hockey forward. She plays junior hockey in Ontario and has represented Canada at the IIHF World Women's U18 Championship, winning a silver medal in 2026.

== Early life ==
Milani is from Oakville, Ontario. In a 2025 profile, The Hockey News described her early development as including training on a backyard outdoor rink at home.

== Playing career ==
Milani has played for the Etobicoke Dolphins in the OWHA U22 Elite circuit, and was profiled as a young-age player competing against older opposition in The Hockey News prospect coverage. Hockey Canada roster materials also list her with Ontario programs at the U18 national championship level and at national under-18 camps and series.

Milani also appeared on Hockey Canada rosters at the Esso Cup level, including being listed on the Stoney Creek Sabres roster for the 2023 Esso Cup.

=== College commitment ===
In 2025, Milani was announced as part of the University of Minnesota's 2026–27 women's hockey signing class. The Hockey News reported that she was expected to join Minnesota a year earlier than typical for her birth year, beginning in the 2026–27 season.

== International play ==
In December 2025, Milani was named to Canada's National Women's Under-18 Team for the 2026 IIHF U18 Women's World Championship in Sydney and Membertou, Nova Scotia.

At the tournament, Milani scored four goals in Canada's quarterfinal win over Finland. Canada finished the event with the silver medal after losing to the United States in the gold medal game.

IIHF tournament pages listed Milani on the event All-Star Team, and IIHF statistics credited her with 10 goals and 13 points in six games at the tournament. Daily Faceoff described her tournament as matching the Canadian single-tournament goals record, with 10 goals in six games.

== Career statistics ==
=== International ===
Year	Team	Event	Result	GP	G	A	Pts	PIM
2026	Canada	U18	2nd place, silver medalist(s)	6	10	3	13	2
Junior totals				6	10	3	13	2
