= Chyna Taylor =

American ice hockey player (born 2009)

- Born: July 10, 2009 (age 17) Louisville, Kentucky, U.S.
- Height: 5 ft 6 in (168 cm)
- Position: Defense
- Shoots: Left
- USHS team: Lovell Academy

Chyna Taylor (born July 10, 2009) is an American ice hockey player for Lovell Academy.

== Early life ==
Taylor began figure skating at around four years old, before transitioning to ice hockey at five years old. She grew up playing ice hockey on coed teams for the Louisville Ice Cardinals. She then moved to Rockland, Massachusetts to attend Lovell Academy at 12 years old. During the 2024–25 season she recorded 26 goals and 8 assists in 83 games with Lovell's U16 AAA team. She was named the 2025 SportsKid of the Year.

She is committed to play college ice hockey at Wisconsin during the 2027–28 season.

== International play ==
Medal record

Representing United States

Ice hockey

World U18 Championships
Gold medal – first place	2026 Canada	
Silver medal – second place	2025 Finland	

On November 13, 2024, Taylor was selected to represent the United States at the 2025 IIHF World Women's U18 Championship. At 15 years old, she was the youngest member on the team. She became the first player from the state of Kentucky, male or female, to represent the United States at any level at an International Ice Hockey Federation event or the Olympics. She recorded two assists in six games and won a silver medal.

Taylor returned to the 2026 IIHF U18 Women's World Championship where she recorded eleven assists in six games and won a gold medal.
