= Sports Illustrated Kids =

American children's sports magazine

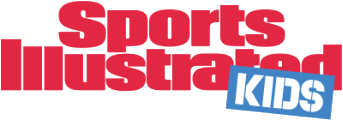

- The first issue of Sports Illustrated for Kids, January 1, 1989, showing NBA Superstar Michael Jordan with friends Brad Pielet and Nancy Deller.
- Managing Editor: Bob Der
- Staff writers: Staff Managing Editor SI.com: Paul Fichtenbaum; Managing Editor: Bob Der; Creative Director: Beth Power Bugler; Senior Producer: Paul Ulane; Executive Marketing Director: Eileen Masio
- Categories: Sports magazine
- Frequency: bi-monthly
- Circulation: 107,202
- First issue: January 1, 1989
- Company: Authentic Brands Group
- Language: English
- Website: sikids.com
- ISSN: 1042-394X

Sports Illustrated Kids (SI Kids, trademarked Sports Illustrated KIDS, sometimes Sports Illustrated for Kids) is a bi-monthly spin-off of the weekly American sports magazine Sports Illustrated. SI Kids was launched in January 1989 and includes sports coverage with less vocabulary and more emphasis on humor. The magazine's secondary purpose is to market sports to children.

Sports Illustrated Kids was created by Mark Mulvoy, the managing editor of Sports Illustrated, targeted at a younger audience. He continued to oversee the publication until his retirement in 1996.

The first issue featured Naismith Basketball Hall of Fame member and former Chicago Bulls guard Michael Jordan on the cover.

== Sports Illustrated Teen ==
Sports Illustrated Teen (SI Teen, trademarked Sports Illustrated TEEN, sometimes Sports Illustrated TEEN Edition) was a bound multiple-page insert within regular monthly issues of SI Kids, written for the older readers of the children's magazine. Its contents featured more statistics, predictions, and in-depth looks at both team-based and extreme sports. Sports Illustrated Teen first appeared in the January 2004 issue, being published until it was cancelled in the March 2010 issue and was replaced with a selected article from Sports Illustrated.

== Partnership with Topps ==
In March 2006, the Topps company and Sports Illustrated Kids announced a marketing alliance to increase the overall awareness of trading card collecting among kids. The magazine advertises the inclusion of sports cards within every issue.

== Magazine contents ==
Monthly features include comics, humorous captions of athletics photos, child reporters, and player interviews.

The magazine's recurring mascot is Buzz Beamer, a buzz-cut blond-haired Caucasian boy always in dark glasses. He stars in most of the comics in which he plays a variety of sports and also appeared in several flash cartoons on the official website. Buzz is created and drawn by award-winning cartoonist Bill Hinds.

Other works have been published under the magazine title including video games, a television show, and books (such as a sports pop-up book).

The December edition of the magazine features the SportsKid of the Year.

Each issue features a poster that can be torn out of the issue.

== Cover history ==
Most covers by athlete, 1989–2011

Athlete	Number of covers
Michael Jordan	4
Shaquille O'Neal	5

Spot Preview Editions 1989–2011

Issue Title	Year	Month	Special notes
2007 NFL Preview!	2007	September	Scouting Reports, Breakout Stars and Predictions
College Football Preview	2007	August	The Top 10 We Rank the Best of Everything: Teams, Mascots, Sleepers Heisman Candidates, and More!
2007 Baseball Preview	2007	May	
NBA Preview	2006	November	
Baseball Preview	2006	April	Team Scouting Reports, Players to Watch, and Post-season Predictions
Winter Olympic Preview	2006	February	
NBA Preview	2005	November	Scouting Reports, Predictions, and Players to Watch.
Pro Football Preview	2003	September	Fearless Super Bowl Predictions and Breakdowns of all 32 NFL teams.

Special Editions 1989–2011

Issue Title	Year(s)	Month(s)	Special notes
Athletes Give Back	2011	October	Athletes support Breast Cancer (Magazine cover special all pink printing)
The Video Game Issue	2009	October	Top 10 Games of the Year and Sneek Peek at the Future of Gaming.
Special Bonus Issue	2007	Winter	It's all about Football. 52 Pages on America's Sport.
Special Mega Issue	2006/2007	December/January	Bonus: Gotta Get it Guide
Best of the Best	2003	June	We pick Who (and what) is Number 1 in Sports.
Best of the Best	2002	May	Who rules in almost everything in sports.
Olympic Double Issue	2000	October	Featuring guide to 12 days of Olympic action
Winter Olympic Issue	1998	February	
Olympic Double Issue	1996	July	
Kids Take Over This Issue!	1995	March	The entire issue is written by kids.
Summer 1992 Olympic Preview	1992	July	
Winter Olympics	1992	February	Featuring highlights from the
In Dad's Duds	1991	June	Featuring kids of sports stars
Special Extremely Silly Issue	1995	November	

== Awards and recognition ==
- Won the "Distinguished Achievement for Excellence in Educational Publishing" award 11 times
- Won the "Parents' Choice Magazine Award" 7 times

== See also ==
- SportsKid of the Year
- Sports Illustrated
- Sports Illustrated Almanac
- Sports Illustrated Women
- Faces in the Crowd (Sports Illustrated)
