= SportsKid of the Year =

Annual honor presented by Sports Illustrated

"SportsKid of the Year" was introduced by Sports Illustrated magazine after the highly successful Sportsman of the Year award was introduced in 1954. The "SportsKid of the Year" award honors a young athlete, ages seven to fifteen, for superior performance on the field, in the classroom and service in the community.

In addition to being featured exclusively on the December Sports Illustrated Kids cover, the "SportsKid of the Year" receives a profile article and fold-out poster in the issue. The SportsKid is also honored at Sports Illustrated's annual Sportsman of the Year celebration in New York City and in 2011 was featured on Cartoon Network's "Hall of Game" in Los Angeles.

The award has been given to the following recipients:

Year	Winner(s)	Sport(s)	Age(s)	Ref
2007	(United States) Brock Heffron	BMX	10	
2008	(United States) Derek Andrews	Baseball, soccer, hockey, basketball, gymnastics, and swimming	8	
2009	(United States) Austin McCarthy	Hockey	10	
2010	(United States) Jessica Aney	Tennis and hockey	12	
2011	(United States) Noah Flegel	Wakeboarding	14	
2012	(United States) Conner and Cayden Long	Triathlon	9, 7	
2013	(United States) Jack Wellman	Wrestling	14	
2014	(United States) Mo'ne Davis	Baseball	13	
2015	(United States) Reece Whitley	Swimming	15	
2016	(United States) Tai, Rainn, and Brooke Sheppard	Track	11, 10, 9	
2017	(United States) Maxwell "Bunchie" Young	Football and track	10	
2018	(United States) Leah Hayes	Swimming	13	
2019	(United States) Ally Sentnor	Soccer	15	
2020	(United States) JuJu Watkins	Basketball	15	
2021	(United States) Zaila Avant-garde	Basketball, spelling	14	
2022	(United States) Carter Bonas	Golf	11	
2023	(United States) Fifi Garcia	Soccer, softball, track, volleyball, and basketball	11	
2024	(United States) Arden Pala	Basketball	15	
2025	(United States) Chyna Taylor	Ice hockey	16	
