= Morgan Stickney (ice hockey) =

American ice hockey player (born 2008)

- Born: January 18, 2008 (age 18) Manhattan Beach, California, U.S.
- Height: 5 ft 8 in (173 cm)
- Weight: 135 lb (61 kg; 9 st 9 lb)
- Position: Goaltender
- Catches: Left
- USHS team: Shattuck-Saint Mary's

Morgan Stickney (born January 18, 2008) is an American ice hockey goaltender for Shattuck-Saint Mary's. She was the first female American player to be selected in a Canadian Hockey League draft.

== Playing career ==
Stickney attends Shattuck-Saint Mary's in Faribault, Minnesota. During the 2022–23 season, as a freshman, she posted a 23–4–3 record with a 1.52 goals-against average (GAA) and .928 save percentage. During the 2023–24 season, as a sophomore, she posted a 28–0–2 record with a 1.55 GAA and .932 save percentage.

On May 11, 2023, the Portland Winterhawks of the Western Hockey League (WHL) selected Stickney in the tenth round, 215th overall, in the 2023 WHL Draft. She was the second female player to be drafted by a CHL team, after Chloe Primerano the previous year, and the first female American player drafted.

Stickney is committed to play college ice hockey at Penn State during the 2026–27 season.

== International play ==
Medal record

Representing United States

Ice hockey

World U18 Championships
Gold medal – first place	2026 Canada	
Silver medal – second place	2025 Finland	

On November 13, 2024, Stickney was selected to represent the United States at the 2025 IIHF World Women's U18 Championship. On January 9, 2025, in a game against Slovakia, she recorded an assist on a goal in the third period. This marked the first time in IIHF U18 Women's World Championship history that a goaltender accomplished this. She posted three consecutive shutouts during the preliminary round, and a single-tournament shutout streak record of 183:01 minutes. This surpassed the previous record of 179:47 set by Team USA's Sidney Peters in 2013. During the tournament she started all six games with five wins, one loss, and helped team USA win a silver medal. She led the tournament with a 0.67 GAA and .957 save percentage, and was named to the media all-star team.

On October 31, 2025, she was again selected to compete at the 2026 IIHF U18 Women's World Championship. On January 10, 2026, during the first preliminary round game against Slovakia, she posted a five-save shutout for her fourth career IIHF U18 Women's World Championship, setting a new all-time tournament record for shutouts. This was also her sixth career U18 World Championship win, tying the all-time U.S. record for wins at the tournament. On January 13, 2026, during the final preliminary round game against Finland, she posted her a seven-save shutout for her fifth career shutout, extending her tournament record. This also marked her seventh career win, setting a new American record for wins at the tournament.

== Personal life ==
Stickney was born to Kenneth and Tracy Stickney, and has four siblings, Tyler, Alegra, Grayson, and Parker. Her brother, Parker, is a track and field athlete at UC Santa Barbara.

Her father, Ken, was the owner of the Las Vegas Thunder in the International Hockey League from 1993 to 1999, along with her grandfather, Hank. In February 2016, he became owner of Lausanne HC in the National League. He sold the team to Petr Svoboda in May 2020.
