= Kendall Doiron =

Canadian ice hockey forward (born 2008)

- Born: 23 May 2008 (age 18) Boylston, Nova Scotia, Canada
- Height: 5 ft 2 in (157 cm)
- Position: Forward
- Shoots: Right
- National team: Canada
Medal record
Women's ice hockey
World U18 Championships
Silver medal – second place	2026 Canada

Kendall Doiron (born 23 May 2008) is a Canadian ice hockey forward. She has represented Team Atlantic at the National Women's Under-18 Championship and Canada at the IIHF World Women's U18 Championship.

In 2025, Doiron captained Team Atlantic at the National Women's Under-18 Championship and was described by The Hockey News as a commit to St. Lawrence University. She was also reported as being named the tournament's top forward at the 2025 event.

== Early life ==
Doiron is from Boylston, Nova Scotia. In 2022, she was mentioned in the Nova Scotia Legislature during a statement recognizing the Quad County Whitecaps' U15 AAA provincial championship, which included Doiron as a player from the constituency.

By 2024, she was attending Shattuck-St. Mary's in Faribault, Minnesota, which was described in Hockey Canada coverage as part of her development path.

== Playing career ==
=== Club and school ===
Doiron played for the Northern Selects in Atlantic Canada. In 2023, The Hockey News profiled her during its "Prospect Watch" series, highlighting her performance around the Esso Cup and noting she was named the tournament's most sportsmanlike player.

She later played for Shattuck-St. Mary's School in Minnesota, and Hockey Canada reporting noted her involvement with Team Atlantic at the 2024 National Women's Under-18 Championship while also referencing her U.S. prep program play.

=== Team Atlantic ===
Doiron represented Team Atlantic at multiple editions of the National Women's Under-18 Championship. The Hockey News and regional reporting described her as Team Atlantic's captain at the 2025 tournament, and she was reported as receiving top-forward recognition at that event.

=== International ===
In December 2025, regional reporting covered Doiron being named to Canada's roster for the 2026 IIHF World Women's U18 Championship, hosted in Sydney and Membertou, Nova Scotia. Canada finished the tournament with the silver medal, losing to the United States in the gold medal game.

IIHF coverage during the event described Doiron as a first-time Team Canada player at the tournament and reported she recorded goals and assists during the preliminary round. Regional reporting also noted she received player-of-the-game honours in the gold medal game.

== Career statistics ==
=== International ===
Year	Team	Event	Result	GP	G	A	Pts	PIM
2026	Canada	U18	2nd place, silver medalist(s)	6	2	3	5	0
Junior totals				6	2	3	5	0
