= Rosalie Tremblay =

Canadian ice hockey player (born 2008)

- Born: September 16, 2008 (age 18) Sherbrooke, Quebec, Canada
- Height: 5 ft 7 in (170 cm)
- Weight: 150 lb (68 kg; 10 st 10 lb)
- Position: Forward
- Shoots: Left
- WCHA team: Wisconsin
- National team: Canada
Medal record
World Championships
Silver medal – second place	2026 Denmark

Rosalie Tremblay (born September 16, 2008) is a Canadian college ice hockey forward for the Wisconsin Badgers of the National Collegiate Athletic Association (NCAA).

== Playing career ==
Tremblay played junior hockey with Stanstead College of the Junior Women's Hockey League (JWHL). During her senior year she was named the 2025–26 Liz Turgeon Player of the Year award winner. She helped Team Quebec win gold at the U18 Canadian national championships, their first ever National Championship at the U18 level. She scored the game-winning goal and was named tournament MVP.

On November 19, 2025, she signed her National Letter of Intent to play college ice hockey at Wisconsin during the 2026–27 season. On October 17, 2026, against Minnesota State, she recorded her first career hat-trick. She finished the game with four goals and one assist. She became the eleventh player in program history, and the third rookie, to record a four-goal game. She was subsequently named the WCHA Rookie of the Week for the week ending October 19, 2026.

== International play ==
On December 10, 2024, she was selected to represent Canada at the 2025 IIHF U18 Women's World Championship. During the tournament she recorded two assists in six games and won a gold medal. On December 11, 2025, she was again selected to represent Canada at the 2026 IIHF U18 Women's World Championship. During the tournament she recorded three goals and four assists in six games and won a silver medal.

In September 2026, she was selected to compete at the Canadian women's hockey team's training camp. At 18 years old. she was the youngest invitee among 48 players. On October 19, 2026, she was selected to represent Canada at the 2026 IIHF Women's World Championship, where she will make her senior national team debut. At 18 years old, she became Team Canada's youngest forward since Marie-Philip Poulin in 2009. On November 8, 2026, she scored her first goal as a member of the senior national team in a game against Japan.

== Personal life ==
Tremblay was born to Yannick Tremblay and Karine Derosiers, has two siblings, Sam and Maxim. Her sister Maxim plays college ice hockey at Boston College.

== Career statistics ==
=== International ===
Year	Team	Event	Result	GP	G	A	Pts	PIM
2025	Canada	U18	1st place, gold medalist(s)	6	0	2	2	0
2026	Canada	U18	2nd place, silver medalist(s)	6	3	4	7	2
Junior totals				12	3	6	9	2
