= Junior Women's Hockey League =

- Sport: ice hockey
- Founded: 2007
- Country: United States; Canada

The Junior Women's Hockey League is an ice hockey league established in 2007 by Bill Driscoll and Kush Sidhu, coaches of North American Hockey Academy and the Washington Pride, respectively, in order to provide opportunities for young females to develop into collegiate student-athletes. U19, U16 and U14 divisions are sanctioned by the JWHL.

== History ==
A successful league since its first season, the JWHL has seen hundreds of players sign with NCAA Division I or Division III schools since 2007. Over 20 JWHL players have skated for the U.S., Canadian, Czech, and Japanese Under-18 National teams. The JWHL was developed to bring together teams that regularly produce NCAA calibre players. The league started with four teams, expanding to 12 teams in 2012-13. Ten teams will compete in the 2017-18 season.

== Season competition ==
Currently, each team plays all the other teams three times during the regular season (27 games in the 2017-18 season). All teams also compete in the JWHL Challenge Cup (see below). Following the regular season, a playoff is held to determine the JWHL Champion.

Games are played with three 20-minute stop-time periods with ice typically being resurfaced between periods. Most games in the US are played on college campuses. Games are played by USA Hockey or Hockey Canada rules depending on the location of the venue.

=== JWHL Challenge Cup ===
The JWHL's premier event takes place in mid-February with the hosting of the JWHL Challenge Cup. The Challenge Cup brings together all of the JWHL teams as well as invited teams from across the US and Canada. The Challenge Cup has been hosted by the Washington Pride in the Washington, D.C. area, who are supported by the NHL's Washington Capitals.

== Teams ==
Major Junior Division	Location
Balmoral Hall School	Winnipeg, Manitoba
Boston Shamrocks	Boston, Massachusetts
Chicago Young Americans	Chicago, Illinois
Little Caesars Hockey Club	Detroit, Michigan
New England Hockey Club	Marlborough, Massachusetts
North American Hockey Academy	Stowe, Vermont
Ottawa Lady 67s	Ottawa, Ontario
Pacific Steelers	Vancouver, British Columbia
Ridley College	St. Catharines, Ontario
Washington Pride	Washington, D.C.
U16 Division	Location
Boston Shamrocks	Boston, Massachusetts
Chicago Young Americans	Chicago, Illinois
Little Caesars Hockey Club	Detroit, Michigan
Newbridge Academy	Sackville, Nova Scotia
North American Hockey Academy	Stowe, Vermont
Washington Pride	Washington, D.C.

== Champions ==
Season	U19 Champion	U19 Runner-up	Result	Location
2008	North American Hockey Academy	Pacific Steelers		South Surrey Arena, Surrey, British Columbia
2009	North American Hockey Academy	Balmoral Hall School		Ralph Englestad Arena, Grand Forks, North Dakota
2010	Warner Hockey School			Kettler Capitals Iceplex, Arlington, Virginia
2011	North American Hockey Academy	Edge School		Kohl Center, Madison, Wisconsin
2012	North American Hockey Academy	Edge School		Edge Ice Arena, Littleton, Colorado
2013	North American Hockey Academy	Edge School		Ralph Englestad Arena, Grand Forks, North Dakota
2014	North American Hockey Academy	Okanagan Hockey Academy	6-0	University of British Columbia, Vancouver, BC
2015	Warner Hockey School	North American Hockey Academy		The HarborCenter, Buffalo, New York
2016	Washington Pride	Edge School		The HarborCenter, Buffalo, New York
2017	North American Hockey Academy	Pacific Steelers	1-0 (shootout)	The HarborCenter, Buffalo, New York
2018	North American Hockey Academy	Pacific Steelers		Little Caesars Arena, Detroit, Michigan
2019	Balmoral Hall School	North American Hockey Academy		Cairns Arena, Burlington, Vermont
2020	North American Hockey Academy	Ottawa Lady 67's		Ridley College - St. Catharines, Ontario

== Elizabeth 'Liz' Turgeon Memorial Player of the Year Award ==
- 2010–11: Haley Skarupa, (Washington Pride)
- 2011–12: Haley Skarupa (Washington Pride)
- 2012–13: Annie Pankowski (North American Hockey Academy)
- 2013–14: Jaycee Gebhard (Athol Murray College Notre Dame)
- 2014–15: Shae Labbe (Warner Hockey School)
- 2015–16: Carlee Turner (North American Hockey Academy)
- 2016–17: Veronika Pettey (Washington Pride)
- 2017–18: Emma Wuthrich (North American Hockey Academy)

== Season results ==
Major Junior Division Final Regular Season Standings 2016-17
#	Team	GP	W	L	T	PTS	GF	GA
1	NAHA White	24	18	2	4	40	108	43
2	Chicago Young Americans	24	13	7	4	30	79	61
3	Pacific Steelers	24	12	8	4	28	64	55
4	Washington Pride	24	10	6	8	28	63	49
5	Balmoral Hall	24	10	7	7	27	95	73
6	Ridley College	24	9	9	6	24	76	80
7	Boston Shamrocks	24	5	18	1	11	54	89
8	NEHC	24	1	21	2	4	32	121

== See also ==
- United States women's national U-18 ice hockey team
- Canada women's national U-18 ice hockey team
