= 2026 IIHF U18 Women's World Championship =

Tournament details
- Host country: Canada
- Venues: 2 (in 2 host cities)
- Dates: 10–18 January 2026
- Teams: 8

Final positions
- Champions: United States (10th title)
- Runners-up: Canada
- Third place: Czechia
- Fourth place: Sweden

Tournament statistics
- Games played: 21
- Goals scored: 180 (8.57 per game)
- Attendance: 26,710 (1,272 per game)
- Scoring leader: (United States) Jane Daley (17 points)

Awards
- MVP: (United States) Jane Daley

Official website
- www.iihf.com

The 2026 IIHF U18 Women's World Championship was the 18th U18 Women's World Championship in ice hockey.

== Top Division ==
The Top Division tournament was played in Membertou and Sydney, Nova Scotia, Canada, from 10 to 18 January 2026.

=== Host selection ===
On 3 January 2025, Canada and the IIHF signed an agreement handing five IIHF women's competitions between 2026 and 2030 to Canada.

=== Participants ===
Eight teams took part in the competition. Hungary returned for the first time since 2014. They replaced Japan, who were immediately relegated back to the Division I after finishing last in 2025.

Qualification	Host	Dates	Vacancies	Qualified
Top seven in 2025	(Finland) Vantaa	4–12 January 2025	7	Canada **(H)**; United States; Czechia; Sweden; Switzerland; Finland; Slovakia
Promoted from Division I	(Hungary) Budapest	5–11 January 2025	1	Hungary

=== Summary of qualified teams ===
Team	Qualification method	Appearance(s)				Previous best performance (Note: Bold text indicates they hosted that edition.)
Team	Qualification method	Total (Note: In top division. Results in tiers below are excluded.)	First	Last	Streak	Previous best performance
Canada	First in 2025	18th	2008	2025	18	**Champions** (2010, 2012, 2013, 2014, 2019, 2022, 2023, 2025)
United States	Second in 2025	18th	2008	2025	18	**Champions** (2008, 2009, 2011, **2015**, 2016, 2017, 2018, 2020, 2024)
Czechia	Third in 2025	18th	2008	2025	18	Runners-up (2024)
Sweden	Fourth in 2025	18th	2008	2025	18	Runners-up (2018, **2023**)
Switzerland	Fifth in 2025	15th	2008	2025	11	Fifth place (2025)
Finland	Sixth in 2025	18th	2008	2025	18	Third place (2011, 2019, 2022)
Slovakia	Seventh in 2025	6th	2020	2025	6	Sixth place (2022, 2023, 2024)
Hungary	Champions of Division I	3rd	2013	2014	1	Sixth place (2013)

=== Groups composition ===
The serpentine system was used to organise the groups (rankings in brackets).

Group A

- Canada (1)
- Sweden (4)
- Switzerland (5)
- Hungary (8)

Group B

- United States (2)
- Czechia (3)
- Finland (6)
- Slovakia (7)

=== Preliminary round ===
All times are local (UTC−4).

==== Group A ====
Pos	Team	Pld	W	OTW	OTL	L	GF	GA	GD	Pts	Qualification
1	Canada (H)	3	3	0	0	0	32	2	+30	**9**	Quarterfinals
2	Sweden	3	2	0	0	1	9	10	−1	**6**	Quarterfinals
3	Switzerland	3	1	0	0	2	2	12	−10	**3**	Quarterfinals
4	Hungary	3	0	0	0	3	1	20	−19	**0**	Quarterfinals

Source: IIHF
Rules for classification: 1) points; 2) head-to-head points; 3) head-to-head goal difference; 4) head-to-head number of goals scored; 5) result against closest best-ranked team outside tied teams; 6) result against second-best-ranked team outside tied teams; 7) seeding before tournament
(H) Host

10 January 2026; 17:00	**Sweden**	**4–1** (1–0, 1–1, 2–0)	Hungary	Sport and Wellness Centre, Membertou; Attendance: 332

Game reference

Meja Engelin
Goalies
Zoé Takács
Referees:
(Finland) Reetta-Kaisa Lusi
(Switzerland) Reica Staiger
Linesmen:
(United States) Kathryn Glover
(Switzerland) Anina Schüpbach

Hesselvall (Nygren, Grillfors) – 06:44	1–0
Lindgren (Åkerlund, Nordqvist) – 21:28	2–0
	2–1	33:36 – Hiezl (Simon, Gyula)
Stridh (Österman, Karlsson) – 44:30	3–1
Grillfors (Westerlind, Åkerlund) – 45:23	4–1

6 min
Penalties
4 min
34
Shots
14

10 January 2026; 20:30	Switzerland	**0–9** (0–5, 0–2, 0–2)	**Canada**	Sport and Wellness Centre, Membertou; Attendance: 1,162

Game reference

Anne-Eugénie Gendre
Norina Schrupkowski
Goalies
Lea-Rose Charrois
Referees:
(Japan) Anna Kuroda
(Canada) Amy Martin
Linesmen:
(Finland) Helinä Anttila
(United States) Erika Greenen

0–1	07:26 – Piggott (Korte, Viel)
0–2	09:57 – Ca. Tiller (Doiron, Aubin) (PP)
0–3	10:55 – Ismael (Piggott)
0–4	12:08 – McDonald (McCullough, Viel)
0–5	17:26 – Doiron (Lévesque, Jones)
0–6	25:29 – Aubin (Milani, Maechtel)
0–7	30:02 – Korte (Piggott, Jones)
0–8	44:56 – Milani (Tremblay)
0–9	49:33 – Korte (Leprohon)

6 min
Penalties
2 min
11
Shots
51

12 January 2026; 11:00	**Sweden**	**3–0** (2–0, 1–0, 0–0)	Switzerland	Sport and Wellness Centre, Membertou; Attendance: 362

Game reference

Thea Holmberg
Goalies
Norina Schrupkowski
Referees:
(Canada) Amy Martin
(Czech Republic) Martina Volkánová
Linesmen:
(Canada) Jessica Chartrand
(France) Alexia Cheyroux

Nygren (Hesselvall) – 03:34	1–0
Westerlind – 15:54	2–0
Hesselvall (Blårand, Lindgren) (PP) – 32:24	3–0

6 min
Penalties
10 min
48
Shots
16

12 January 2026; 18:00	**Canada**	**14–0** (4–0, 7–0, 3–0)	Hungary	Sport and Wellness Centre, Membertou; Attendance: 1,203

Game reference

Rowan Houweling
Goalies
Zoé Takács
Csenge Csordás
Referees:
(Sweden) Anna Hammar
(Japan) Anna Kuroda
Linesmen:
(Canada) Stéphanie Gagnon
(Switzerland) Anina Schüpbach

Mossey (Matt) – 02:00	1–0
Milani (Mossey, McDonald) (PP) – 04:55	2–0
Milani (Tremblay, Aubin) – 06:38	3–0
McDonald (Leprohon, Ca. Tiller) – 19:20	4–0
Doiron – 24:14	5–0
Mossey (Sisson, Matt) – 27:49	6–0
McDonald (McCullough) – 28:41	7–0
Milani (Leprohon, Lévesque) – 30:24	8–0
McDonald (Ismael) (PP) – 32:27	9–0
Ca. Tiller (MacKinnon, Matt) – 34:16	10–0
Piggott (Ismael, Korte) – 35:28	11–0
Korte (Mossey, Ismael) – 41:52	12–0
Lévesque (Doiron, Leprohon) – 47:24	13–0
Ismael (Korte, Maechtel) – 49:14	14–0

2 min
Penalties
8 min
74
Shots
11

13 January 2026; 17:00	**Canada**	**9–2** (3–1, 4–1, 2–0)	Sweden	Sport and Wellness Centre, Membertou; Attendance: 1,314

Game reference

Lee-Rose Charrois
Goalies
Thea Holmberg
Meja Engelin
Referees:
(United States) Sydney Harris
(Japan) Anna Kuroda
Linesmen:
(France) Alexia Cheyroux
(Germany) Lara Fischer

	0–1	05:10 – Stridh
Tremblay (Maechtel, Jones) – 07:52	1–1
Tremblay (Aubin, Leprohon) – 11:59	2–1
Piggott (Lévesque, Maechtel) – 17:32	3–1
	3–2	30:39 – Grillfors (Nygren)
Viel (Leprohon, MacKinnon) – 33:27	4–2
Ismael (Piggott, Viel) – 36:51	5–2
McDonald (Ismael, Milani) (PP) – 38:00	6–2
Ismael (Milani, Mossey (PP) – 39:40	7–2
Ismael (McDonald, McCullough (PP) – 50:34	8–2
Korte (Jones, Charrois) (SH) – 51:39	9–2

4 min
Penalties
16 min
38
Shots
11

13 January 2026; 20:30	Hungary	**0–2** (0–0, 0–0, 0–2)	**Switzerland**	Sport and Wellness Centre, Membertou; Attendance: 263

Game reference
Zoé Takács	Goalies	Norina Schrupkowski	Referees: (Sweden) Anna Hammar (Switzerland) Reica Staiger; Linesmen: (United States) Ashley Johnston (Czech Republic) Kamila Smetková
0–1 / 43:17 – Müller (Tschannen); 0–2 / 59:40 – Müller (Mettler) (EN)			Referees: (Sweden) Anna Hammar (Switzerland) Reica Staiger; Linesmen: (United States) Ashley Johnston (Czech Republic) Kamila Smetková
8 min	Penalties	8 min	Referees: (Sweden) Anna Hammar (Switzerland) Reica Staiger; Linesmen: (United States) Ashley Johnston (Czech Republic) Kamila Smetková
31	Shots	27	Referees: (Sweden) Anna Hammar (Switzerland) Reica Staiger; Linesmen: (United States) Ashley Johnston (Czech Republic) Kamila Smetková

==== Group B ====
Pos	Team	Pld	W	OTW	OTL	L	GF	GA	GD	Pts	Qualification
1	United States	3	3	0	0	0	36	1	+35	**9**	Quarterfinals
2	Czechia	3	2	0	0	1	17	12	+5	**6**	Quarterfinals
3	Slovakia	3	1	0	0	2	7	22	−15	**3**	Quarterfinals
4	Finland	3	0	0	0	3	3	28	−25	**0**	Quarterfinals

Source: IIHF
Rules for classification: 1) points; 2) head-to-head points; 3) head-to-head goal difference; 4) head-to-head number of goals scored; 5) result against closest best-ranked team outside tied teams; 6) result against second-best-ranked team outside tied teams; 7) seeding before tournament

10 January 2026; 10:00	Slovakia	**0–13** (0–5, 0–3, 0–5)	**United States**	Sport and Wellness Centre, Membertou; Attendance: 429

Game reference

Zuzana Tomečková
Mariana Sumegová
Goalies
Morgan Stickney
Referees:
(Canada) Jennifer Berezowski
(Czech Republic) Martina Volkánová
Linesmen:
(Canada) Jessica Chartrand
(Czech Republic) Kamila Smetková

0–1	00:35 – Kimbrel (Amelkovich)
0–2	02:31 – Daley (Amelkovich, Scalese) (PP)
0–3	07:32 – Daley (Miller, Averill)
0–4	08:44 – Lovell (McLaughlin, Stepnowski)
0–5	14:22 – Hansen (Daley, Stepnowski)
0–6	26:41 – Scalese (Sandler)
0–7	33:39 – Averill (Sander, Amelkovich)
0–8	37:53 – Averill (Amelkovich)
0–9	41:45 – Hansen (Taylor, Pohl)
0–10	45:00 – Scalese (Amelkovich, Taylor) (PP)
0–11	46:16 – Averill (Scalese)
0–12	55:41 – Daley (Amelkovich, Taylor)
0–13	56:34 – Stepnowski (McLay, Hansen)

6 min
Penalties
8 min
5
Shots
75

10 January 2026; 13:30	**Czechia**	**9–1** (2–1, 2–0, 5–0)	Finland	Sport and Wellness Centre, Membertou; Attendance: 328

Game reference

Lili Chmelařová
Goalies
Eerika Kujala
Saimi Pesola
Referees:
(United States) Sydney Harris
(Latvia) Agnese Kārkliņa
Linesmen:
(France) Alexia Cheyroux
(Canada) Stéphanie Gagnon

	0–1	11:58 – Tapani (Siitonen, Ruonakoski) (PP2)
Pánková (Šindelářová, Gildainová) (PP) – 14:53	1–1
Kantorová (Mynaříková) – 19:11	2–1
Mynaříková (Kantorová, Pěnčíková) – 33:24	3–1
Gildainová (Jebousková, Paroubková) – 39:00	4–1
Šindelářová (Mynaříková) – 41:14	5–1
Březinová (Paroubková) (PP) – 50:57	6–1
Gildainová (Jarabková, Jebousková) (SH) – 52:48	7–1
Jarabková (Kantorová, Pěnčíková) – 55:19	8–1
Mynaříková (Jebousková) – 56:08	9–1

12 min
Penalties
8 min
53
Shots
19

11 January 2026; 13:30	Finland	**2–5** (0–2, 1–1, 1–2)	**Slovakia**	Sport and Wellness Centre, Membertou; Attendance: 327

Game reference

Eerika Kujala
Goalies
Mariana Sumegová
Referees:
(Sweden) Anna Hammar
(United States) Laura Schmidlein
Linesmen:
(Germany) Lara Fischer
(United States) Ashley Johnston

	0–1	09:38 – Lopušanová (Mikulášiková)
	0–2	17:03 – Lopušanová (Karkošková, Juríková) (PP)
Tapani (Siivonen, Hämäläinen) – 21:30	1–2
	1–3	36:39 – Hirjaková (Karkošková, Juríková) (PP)
	1–4	41:52 – Lopušanová (Roštecká)
Siivonen (Ruonakoski, Kärkkäinen) – 52:14	2–4
	2–5	58:32 – Lopušanová (EN)

10 min
Penalties
4 min
22
Shots
29

11 January 2026; 18:00	**United States**	**9–1** (4–0, 4–1, 1–0)	Czechia	Sport and Wellness Centre, Membertou; Attendance: 647

Game reference

Bianca Birrittieri
Goalies
Lili Chmelařová
Veronika Ortová
Referees:
(Canada) Jennifer Berezowski
(Switzerland) Reica Staiger
Linesmen:
(Finland) Helinä Anttila
(Czech Republic) Kamila Smetková

Daley (Taylor, Amelkovich) (SH) – 12:06	1–0
Daley – 16:30	2–0
Amelkovich (Taylor, Daley) – 17:03	3–0
Hansen (Pohl, Averill) (PP) – 18:18	4–0
Averill (Kimbrel, Daley) – 20:22	5–0
	5–1	21:27 – Paroubková (Pánková) (PP)
Stepnowski (Pohl, Birrittieri) – 23:04	6–1
McLaughlin (Manion, Miller) – 26:03	7–1
Gnetz (McCool, Hartmetz) – 38:28	8–1
Daley (Amelkovich, Manion) – 45:29	9–1

8 min
Penalties
12 min
53
Shots
16

13 January 2026; 10:00	**Czechia**	**7–2** (3–1, 3–0, 1–1)	Slovakia	Sport and Wellness Centre, Membertou; Attendance: 371

Game reference

Lili Chmelařová
Goalies
Mariana Sumegová
Zuzana Tomečková
Referees:
(Latvia) Agnese Kārkliņa
(United States) Laura Schmidlein
Linesmen:
(Finland) Helinä Anttila
(United States) Kathryn Glover

Gildainová (Paroubková) – 03:00	1–0
Pěnčíková (Kantorová, Březinová) – 10:13	2–0
	2–1	11:17 – Gerö (Lopušanová, Kubáňová)
Kantorová (Jarabková, Mynaříková) (PP) – 14:35	3–1
Pánková (Šťástková, Jebousková) – 25:39	4–1
Březinová (Šťástková, Pěnčíková) – 33:57	5–1
Šindelářová (Paroubková, Jarabková) – 38:17	6–1
Bojdová (Šramková) – 53:34	7–1
	7–2	55:09 – Lopušanová (Letaši, Karkošková) (PP2)

12 min
Penalties
8 min
58
Shots
30

13 January 2026; 13:30	**United States**	**14–0** (6–0, 3–0, 5–0)	Finland	Sport and Wellness Centre, Membertou; Attendance: 540

Game reference

Morgan Stickney
Goalies
Pihla Ikonen
Saimi Pesola
Referees:
(Finland) Reetta-Kaisa Lusi
(Czech Republic) Martina Volkánová
Linesmen:
(United States) Erika Greenen
(Switzerland) Anina Schüpbach

Pohl (Hansen) – 07:16	1–0
Lovell (Averill) – 07:28	2–0
Gnetz (Box, Decourcey) – 14:45	3–0
Hartmetz (Pohl, Averill) (PP) – 17:57	4–0
Rupp (Gnetz, Box) – 18:08	5–0
Daley (Taylor, Lovell) (PP) – 19:37	6–0
Stepnowski (Pohl, Hansen) – 21:38	7–0
Lovell (Daley, Taylor) – 29:30	8–0
Hansen (Pohl, Stepnowski) (PP) – 35:12	9–0
Gnetz (Box, Taylor) – 48:39	10–0
Amelkovich (Lovell, Taylor) (PP) – 50:54	11–0
Bromley (Gnetz, Rupp) – 51:08	12–0
Daley (McLay, Amelkovich) – 52:17	13–0
Daley (Averill) – 55:19	14–0

6 min
Penalties
10 min
71
Shots
7

=== Playoff round ===
Winning teams were reseeded for the semi-finals in accordance with the following ranking:

1. Higher position in their group
2. Higher number of points in preliminary pool play
3. Better goal differential
4. Higher number of goals scored
5. Better seeding coming into the tournament (final placement at the 2025 IIHF World Women's U18 Championship).

Rank	Team	Group	Pos	Pts	GD	GF	Seed
1	United States	B	1	9	+35	36	2
2	Canada	A	1	9	+30	32	1
3	Czechia	B	2	6	+5	17	3
4	Sweden	A	2	6	−1	9	4
5	Switzerland	A	3	3	−10	2	5
6	Slovakia	B	3	3	−15	7	7
7	Hungary	A	4	0	−19	1	8
8	Finland	B	4	0	−25	3	6

==== Bracket ====
Quarterfinals
15 January
1A Canada	**12**
4B Finland	0
15 January
1B United States	**9**
4A Hungary	0
15 January
2A Sweden	**7**
3B Slovakia	2
15 January
2B Czechia	**2**
3A Switzerland	1

Semifinals
17 January
1 United States	**9**
4 Sweden	1
17 January
2 Canada	**8**
3 Czechia	1

Final
18 January
1 United States	**2**
2 Canada	0
Third place
18 January
3 Czechia	**4**
4 Sweden	3

==== Quarterfinals ====
15 January 2026; 10:00	**Sweden**	**7–2** (1–0, 3–1, 3–1)	Slovakia	Centre 200, Sydney; Attendance: 2,872

Game reference

Meja Engelin
Goalies
Mariana Sumegová
Referees:
(Canada) Amy Martin
(United States) Laura Schmidlein
Linesmen:
(Canada) Stephanie Gagnon
(United States) Ashley Johnston

Noren (Westerlind, Stalnacke) – 18:21	1–0
Nordqvist (Lindgren) – 26:57	2–0
Lindgren (Österman, Blarand) – 29:26	3–0
Stridh (Lindgren) (PP) – 30:53	4–0
	4–1	32:05 – Lopušanová (Juríková)
Grillfors (Nordqvist) – 43:35	5–1
	5–2	50:00 – Karkošková (Lipnická, Letaši)
Lindgren (Grillfors, Nordqvist) – 52:07	6–2
Nygren (SH, EN) – 59:26	7–2

12 min
Penalties
6 min
48
Shots
17

15 January 2026; 13:30	**Czechia**	**2–1** (0–1, 1–0, 1–0)	Switzerland	Centre 200, Sydney; Attendance: 665

Game reference

Lili Chmelařová
Goalies
Norina Schrupkowski
Referees:
(Canada) Jennifer Berezowski
(United States) Sydney Harris
Linesmen:
(United States) Erika Greenen
(Switzerland) Anina Schüpbach

	0–1	13:40 – Baker (Huwyler, Estermann)
Tischler (Březinová) – 30:12	1–1
Gildainová (Jebousková) – 58:11	2–1

4 min
Penalties
4 min
42
Shots
14

15 January 2026; 17:00	**United States**	**9–0** (6–0, 3–0, 0–0)	Hungary	Centre 200, Sydney; Attendance: 1,136

Game reference

Bianca Birrittieri
Goalies
Csenge Csordás
Referees:
(Japan) Anna Kuroda
(Switzerland) Reica Staiger
Linesmen:
(Finland) Helinä Anttila
(Czech Republic) Kamila Smetková

Daley (Amelkovich, Averill) – 05:36	1–0
McLaughlin – 06:36	2–0
Pohl (Miller) – 11:32	3–0
Gnetz (Box, Sander) – 13:28	4–0
Gnetz (McCool, Box) – 13:39	5–0
Pohl (Hansen) – 14:57	6–0
Stepnowski – 21;24	7–0
Daley – 28:12	8–0
Hansen (Pohl, Hartmetz) (PP) – 35:09	9–0

12 min
Penalties
4 min
56
Shots
8

15 January 2026; 20:30	**Canada**	**12–0** (5–0, 3–0, 4–0)	Finland	Centre 200, Sydney; Attendance: 2,528

Game reference

Rowan Houweling
Goalies
Saimi Pesola
Eerika Kujala
Referees:
(Latvia) Agnese Kārkliņa
(Finland) Reeta-Kaisa Lusi
Linesmen:
(Canada) Jessica Chartrand
(United States) Kathryn Glover

McDonald (Ismael, Mossey) (PP) – 05:43	1–0
Tremblay (Aubin, Matt) – 08:14	2–0
Milani – 09:06	3–0
Piggott (Korte, Viel) – 10:20	4–0
Milani (Aubin, Tremblay) – 17:06	5–0
McCullogh (Ch. Tiller, Ca. Tiller) – 30:14	6–0
Ismael (Piggott) – 31:45	7–0
Piggott (Korte, Mossey) – 35:29	8–0
McCullogh (McDonald, Ca. Tiller) – 46:41	9–0
Milani – 47:15	10–0
Milani (Aubin, Mossey) – 54:05	11–0
Aubin (Mossey, Tremblay) – 57:28	12–0

2 min
Penalties
8 min
67
Shots
10

==== Semifinals ====
17 January 2026; 16:00	**United States**	**9–1** (2–0, 5–0, 2–1)	Sweden	Centre 200, Sydney; Attendance: 1,414

Game reference

Bianca Birrittieri
Goalies
Meja Engelin
Thea Holmberg
Referees:
(Sweden) Anna Hammar
(United States) Sydney Harris
Linesmen:
(Germany) Lara Fischer
(United States) Erika Greenen

Averill – 03:56	1–0
Pohl (Hansen, Averill) (PP) – 14:51	2–0
McLaughlin (Hartmetz, Scalese) – 26:59	3–0
Daley (Taylor, Amelkovich) (PP2) – 28:05	4–0
Averill (Hartmetz, Pohl) (PP) – 31:18	5–0
Pohl (Hartmetz, Stepnowski) – 33:38	6–0
Kimbrel (Amelkovich, Daley) – 39:16	7–0
	7–1	43:03 – Grillfors (Westerlind, Åkerlund) (PP)
Hansen (Averill) – 44:25	8–1
Stepnowski (Pohl) – 53:52	9–1

6 min
Penalties
35 min
41
Shots
17

17 January 2026; 19:30	**Canada**	**8–1** (3–0, 0–0, 5–1)	Czechia	Centre 200, Sydney; Attendance: 3,761

Game reference

Lea-Rose Charrois
Goalies
Lili Chmelařová
Veronika Ortová
Referees:
(Latvia) Agnese Kārkliņa
(Canada) Amy Martin
Linesmen:
(Canada) Stephanie Gagnon
(United States) Kathryn Glover

McCullogh (Mossey, Charrois) (PP) – 02:06	1–0
Aubin (Doiron, Ca. Tiller) (PP) – 04:46	2–0
Piggott (Ismael) – 05:12	3–0
	3–1	40:41 – Šindelářová (Kantorová, Tischler) (SH)
Milani (Mossey, Ismael) (PP) – 41:36	4–1
Milani (Aubin, Ch. Tiller) – 42:49	5–1
McCullogh (Ismael) (PP) – 44:59	6–1
Ismael (Piggott, Matt) – 50:12	7–1
Piggott – 59:06	8–1

8 min
Penalties
16 min
43
Shots
21

==== Relegation game ====
17 January 2026; 12:00	**Hungary**	**7–5** (2–2, 2–1, 3–2)	Finland	Centre 200, Sydney; Attendance: 564

Game reference

Zoé Takács
Goalies
Eerika Kujala
Referees:
(Canada) Jennifer Berezowski
(United States) Laura Schmidlein
Linesmen:
(France) Alexia Cheyroux
(United States) Ashley Johnston

	0–1	03:14 – Kolmonen (PP)
Polónyi (Hiezl, Weiler) – 10:24	1–1
	1–2	12:37 – Siivonen (Ruonakoski, Loponen) (PP)
Hiezl (Weiler, Polónyi) (PP) – 16:00	2–2
	2–3	26:36 – Loponen (Kolmonen, Junnila)
Temesi (Szalai) – 27:18	3–3
Tamás (Polónyi) – 34:20	4–3
	4–4	43:59 – Kuhta
Hiezl – 47:48	5–4
Polónyi (Hiezl, Hajdú) (PP) – 53:25	6–4
	6–5	57:55 – Siivonen (Kärkkäinen, Hämäläinen) (EA)
Polónyi (Hajdú, Faragó) (EN) – 58:47	7–5

10 min
Penalties
8 min
35
Shots
27

==== Bronze medal game ====
18 January 2026; 15:30	**Czechia**	**4–3** (3–0, 1–2, 0–1)	Sweden	Centre 200, Sydney; Attendance: 1,453

Game reference

Veronika Ortová
Goalies
Thea Holmberg
Referees:
(Canada) Jennifer Berezowski
(United States) Laura Schmidlein
Linesmen:
(France) Alexia Cheyroux
(Canada) Stéphanie Gagnon

Mynaříková – 08:49	1–0
Křenková (Jebousková) – 13:38	2–0
Pánková (Březinová, Gildainová) – 18:50	3–0
	3–1	31:56 – Stridh
	3–2	33:02 – Nygren (Blårand, Österman) (PP)
Pěnčíková (Jarabková, Tischler) – 36:35	4–2
	4–3	46:20 – Stridh (Grillfors) (PP)

10 min
Penalties
6 min
25
Shots
38

==== Gold medal game ====
18 January 2026; 19:30	**United States**	**2–0** (1–0, 1–0, 0–0)	Canada	Centre 200, Sydney; Attendance: 5,039

Game reference
Bianca Birrittieri	Goalies	Lea-Rose Charrois	Referees: (United States) Sydney Harris (Canada) Amy Martin; Linesmen: (Germany) Lara Fischer (United States) Erika Greenen
Pohl (Hansen) – 14:08 / 1–0; Stepnowski (Hansen, Taylor) – 38:17 / 2–0			Referees: (United States) Sydney Harris (Canada) Amy Martin; Linesmen: (Germany) Lara Fischer (United States) Erika Greenen
2 min	Penalties	2 min	Referees: (United States) Sydney Harris (Canada) Amy Martin; Linesmen: (Germany) Lara Fischer (United States) Erika Greenen
27	Shots	38	Referees: (United States) Sydney Harris (Canada) Amy Martin; Linesmen: (Germany) Lara Fischer (United States) Erika Greenen

=== Awards and statistics ===
==== Awards ====
**Best players selected by the Directorate**

Position	Player
Goaltender	(Switzerland) Norina Schrupkowski
Defender	(United States) Maggie Averill
Forward	(United States) Jane Daley

Source:IIHF.com

**All-Star team**

Position	Player
Goaltender	(Switzerland) Norina Schrupkowski
Defender	(United States) Maggie Averill
Defender	(Canada) Megan Mossey
Forward	(United States) Jane Daley
Forward	(Canada) Adrianna Milani
Forward	(Canada) Sofia Ismael
MVP	(United States) Jane Daley

==== Scoring leaders ====
List shows the top skaters sorted by points, then goals.

Rank	Player	GP	G	A	Pts	+/−	PIM	POS
1	(United States) Jane Daley	6	12	5	17	+17	2	F
2	(Canada) Sofia Ismael	6	7	8	15	+15	0	F
3	(United States) Emily Pohl	6	6	9	15	+15	0	F
4	(United States) Maggie Averill	6	6	8	14	+18	4	D
4	(United States) Talla Hansen	6	6	6	12	+14	0	F
6	(United States) Kylie Amelkovich	6	2	12	14	+16	4	F
7	(Canada) Adrianna Milani	6	10	3	13	+12	2	F
8	(Canada) Rachel Piggott	6	7	5	12	+17	0	F
9	(Canada) Megan Mossey	5	2	9	11	+15	0	D
10	(United States) Chyna Taylor	6	0	11	11	+19	0	D

GP = Games played; G = Goals; A = Assists; Pts = Points; +/− = Plus/minus; PIM = Penalties in minutes; POS = Position
Source: IIHF

==== Leading goaltenders ====
Only the top five goaltenders, based on save percentage, who have played at least 40% of their team's minutes, are included in this list.

Rank	Player	TOI	GA	GAA	SA	Sv%	SO
1	(United States) Bianca Birrittieri	240:00	2	0.50	79	**97.47**	2
2	(Switzerland) Norina Schrupkowski	227:52	10	2.63	159	**93.71**	1
3	(Canada) Lea-Rose Charrois	238:00	5	1.26	70	**92.86**	1
4	(Czech Republic) Veronika Ortová	154:48	13	5.04	116	**88.79**	0
5	(Hungary) Zoé Takács	207:57	17	4.91	127	**86.61**	0

TOI = Time on ice (minutes:seconds); SA = Shots against; GA = Goals against; GAA = Goals against average; Sv% = Save percentage; SO = Shutouts
Source: IIHF

=== Final standings ===
Pos	Grp	Team	Pld	W	OTW	OTL	L	GF	GA	GD	Pts	Final result
1	B	United States	6	6	0	0	0	56	2	+54	18	Champions
2	A	Canada (H)	6	5	0	0	1	52	5	+47	15	Runners-up
3	B	Czechia	6	4	0	0	2	24	24	0	12	Third place
4	A	Sweden	6	3	0	0	3	20	25	−5	9	Fourth place
5	A	Switzerland	4	1	0	0	3	3	14	−11	3	Fifth place
6	B	Slovakia	4	1	0	0	3	9	29	−20	3	Sixth place
7	A	Hungary	5	1	0	0	4	8	34	−26	3	Avoided Relegation
8	B	Finland	5	0	0	0	5	8	47	−39	0	Relegated to the Division I A

Source: IIHF
(H) Host

== Division I ==
=== Group A ===
The tournament was held in Ritten, Italy, from 12 to 18 January 2026.

Pos	Team	Pld	W	OTW	OTL	L	GF	GA	GD	Pts	Promotion or relegation
1	Germany	5	4	0	1	0	12	5	+7	13	Promotion to the 2027 Top Division
2	Japan	5	4	0	0	1	34	7	+27	12	
3	France	5	2	1	0	2	13	12	+1	8	
4	Norway	5	2	0	1	2	10	23	−13	7	
5	Denmark	5	1	1	0	3	15	18	−3	5	
6	Italy (H)	5	0	0	0	5	8	27	−19	0	Relegation to the 2027 Division I B

Source: IIHF
Rules for classification: 1) points; 2) head-to-head points; 3) head-to-head goal difference; 4) head-to-head number of goals scored; 5) result against closest best-ranked team outside tied teams; 6) result against second-best ranked team outside tied teams; 7) seeding before tournament.
(H) Host

=== Group B ===
The tournament was held in Katowice, Poland, from 5 to 11 January 2026.

Pos	Team	Pld	W	OTW	OTL	L	GF	GA	GD	Pts	Promotion or relegation
1	China	5	4	1	0	0	30	6	+24	14	Promotion to the 2027 Division I A
2	Poland (H)	5	3	1	1	0	27	11	+16	12	
3	Austria	5	3	0	1	1	27	7	+20	10	
4	Great Britain	5	2	0	0	3	9	13	−4	6	
5	Spain	5	1	0	0	4	5	23	−18	3	
6	Australia	5	0	0	0	5	3	41	−38	0	Relegation to the 2027 Division II A

Source: IIHF
Rules for classification: 1) points; 2) head-to-head points; 3) head-to-head goal difference; 4) head-to-head number of goals scored; 5) result against closest best-ranked team outside tied teams; 6) result against second-best ranked team outside tied teams; 7) seeding before tournament.
(H) Host

== Division II ==
=== Group A ===
The tournament was held in Istanbul, Türkiye, from 19 to 25 January 2026.

Pos	Team	Pld	W	OTW	OTL	L	GF	GA	GD	Pts	Promotion or relegation
1	South Korea	5	4	1	0	0	25	3	+22	14	Promoted to the 2027 Division I B
2	Kazakhstan	5	4	0	0	1	35	9	+26	12	
3	Latvia	5	2	0	1	2	12	19	−7	7	
4	Netherlands	5	2	0	0	3	10	16	−6	6 (Note: Turkey 0–3 Netherlands)	
5	Turkey (H)	5	2	0	0	3	8	12	−4	6	
6	New Zealand	5	0	0	0	5	3	34	−31	0	Relegated to the 2027 Division II B

Source: IIHF
Rules for classification: 1) points; 2) head-to-head points; 3) head-to-head goal difference; 4) head-to-head number of goals scored; 5) result against closest best-ranked team outside tied teams; 6) result against second-best ranked team outside tied teams; 7) seeding before tournament.
(H) Host

=== Group B ===
The tournament was held in Cape Town, South Africa, from 26 January to 1 February 2026.

Pos	Team	Pld	W	OTW	OTL	L	GF	GA	GD	Pts	Promotion
1	Romania	5	4	0	0	1	47	3	+44	12	Promotion to the 2027 Division II A
2	Iceland	5	2	1	1	1	35	14	+21	9 (Note: Iceland 5 Pts, Chinese Taipei 3 Pts, Mexico 1 Pt.)	
3	Chinese Taipei	5	2	1	1	1	21	14	+7	9	
4	Mexico	5	2	1	1	1	20	10	+10	9	
5	Belgium	5	1	1	1	2	19	14	+5	6	
6	South Africa (H)	5	0	0	0	5	1	88	−87	0	

Source: IIHF
Rules for classification: 1) points; 2) head-to-head points; 3) head-to-head goal difference; 4) head-to-head number of goals scored; 5) result against closest best-ranked team outside tied teams; 6) result against second-best ranked team outside tied teams; 7) seeding before tournament.
(H) Host

== Division III ==
The tournament was to be held in Bangkok, Thailand, from 29 January to 4 February 2026, but it was cancelled. Organizers stated that they could not proceed with the tournament in order to protect the "safety and best interests of the athletes."

Pos	Team	Pld	W	OTW	OTL	L	GF	GA	GD	Pts
1	Thailand (H)	0	0	0	0	0	0	0	0	0
2	Croatia	0	0	0	0	0	0	0	0	0
3	Lithuania	0	0	0	0	0	0	0	0	0
4	Bulgaria	0	0	0	0	0	0	0	0	0
5	Iran	0	0	0	0	0	0	0	0	0

Source: IIHF
Rules for classification: 1) points; 2) head-to-head points; 3) head-to-head goal difference; 4) head-to-head number of goals scored; 5) result against closest best-ranked team outside tied teams; 6) result against second-best ranked team outside tied teams; 7) seeding before tournament.
(H) Host
