= Czechia women's national under-18 ice hockey team =

Czech Republic
- Association: Czech Ice Hockey Association
- General manager: Tereza Sadilová (2025)
- Head coach: Dušan Andrašovský (2025)
- Assistants: Martin Pouska; Václav Vacek; Pavel Liehman
- Captain: Linda Vocetková (2025)
- Most games: Aneta Tejralová (22)
- Top scorer: Hana Haasová (7); Kristýna Kaltounková (7); Natálie Mlýnková (7); Tereza Vanišová (7)
- Most points: Kristýna Kaltounková (19)
- IIHF code: CZE
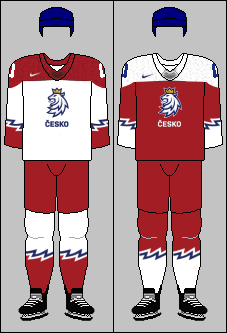

First international
- Canada 11–2 Czech Republic (Calgary, Canada; January 7, 2008)

Biggest win
- Czech Republic 9–1 Finland (Membertou, Canada; 10 January 2026)

Biggest defeat
- United States 18–0 Czech Republic (Fussen, Germany; January 9, 2009)

IIHF U18 Women's World Championship
- Appearances: 17 (first in 2008)
- Best result: (silver) (2024)

International record (W–L–T)
- 33–45–0

Medal record

U18 World Championship
Silver medal – second place	2024 Switzerland	
Bronze medal – third place	2008 Canada	
Bronze medal – third place	2014 Hungary	
Bronze medal – third place	2025 Finland	
Bronze medal – third place	2026 Canada	

The Czech Republic women's national under-18 ice hockey team (Czech: Česká ženská hokejová reprezentace do 18 let) is the national women's junior ice hockey team of the Czech Republic, which represents Czechia at the International Ice Hockey Federation's U18 Women's World Championship and other international U18 competitions.

== U18 Women's World Championship record ==
The Czech women's national under-18 ice hockey team is one of five teams to have participated in every Top Division tournament of the IIHF U18 Women's World Championship since the event was inaugurated in 2008. They have won one U18 World Championship silver medal, in 2024, and three bronze medals, in 2008 and 2014 and 2025.

Year	GP	W	L	GF	GA	Pts	Rank
(Canada) 2008	5	3	2	14	26	9	(bronze) Won bronze medal
(Germany) 2009	5	1	4 (Note: Includes one loss in extra time (in the playoff round))	9	45	4	4th place
(United States) 2010	5	3	2	14	24	9	7th place
(Sweden) 2011	6	2	4	10	33	6	4th place
(Czech Republic) 2012	5	1	4	8	24	3	6th place
(Finland) 2013	6	2	4	12	36	6	4th place
(Hungary) 2014	6	4 (Note: Includes one win in extra time (in the playoff round))	2	12	12	11	(bronze) Won bronze medal
(United States) 2015	6	1	5	7	26	3	4th place
(Canada) 2016	5	1	4	7	24	3	5th place
(Czech Republic) 2017	5	2 (Note: Includes one win in extra time (in the preliminary round))	3	8	11	5	6th place
(Russia) 2018	5	2	3 (Note: Includes one loss in extra time (in the preliminary round))	10	12	7	6th place
(Japan) 2019	6	3	3	15	8	9	7th place
(Slovakia) 2020	5	2	3	10	8	7	6th place
(Sweden) ~~2021~~	Cancelled due to the COVID-19 pandemic						
(United States) 2022	5	4	1	20	6	12	5th place
(Sweden) 2023	5	4	1	20	12	12	5th place
(Switzerland) 2024	6	3	3	18	21	9	(silver) Won silver medal
(Finland) 2025	6	4	2	18	15	11	(bronze) Won bronze medal
(Canada) 2026	6	4	2	24	24	12	(bronze) Won bronze medal

== Team ==
=== Current roster ===
Roster for the 2025 IIHF U18 Women's World Championship.

Head coach: Dušan Andrašovský
Assistant coaches: Martin Pouska, Václav Vacek (goaltender), Pavel Liehman (video)

No.	Pos.	Name	Height	Weight	Birthdate	Team
1	G	Kateřina Fialová	1.74 m (5 ft 9 in)	69 kg (152 lb)	1 August 2007 (age 18)	(Czech Republic) HC Čerti Ostrov U20
2	D	Klára Šrámková	1.58 m (5 ft 2 in)	56 kg (123 lb)	1 February 2010 (age 16)	(Czech Republic) HC České Budějovice U15
4	D	Šarlota Stýblová	1.65 m (5 ft 5 in)	60 kg (130 lb)	22 March 2008 (age 18)	(Canada) OHA Tardiff U22
5	D	Adéla Fromová	1.79 m (5 ft 10 in)	90 kg (200 lb)	30 March 2007 (age 19)	(Czech Republic) SC Kolín U17
6	F	Linda Vocetková – C	1.74 m (5 ft 9 in)	70 kg (150 lb)	22 March 2007 (age 19)	(Sweden) Djurgården IF
7	D	Barbora Prošková – A	1.62 m (5 ft 4 in)	59 kg (130 lb)	7 May 2007 (age 18)	(Sweden) Brynäs IF
8	F	Kateřina Pěnčíková	1.67 m (5 ft 6 in)	63 kg (139 lb)	26 February 2008 (age 18)	(Czech Republic) HC Poruba U15
10	F	Lucie Šindelářová	1.63 m (5 ft 4 in)	62 kg (137 lb)	10 January 2009 (age 17)	(Czech Republic) BK Mladá Boleslav U15
11	D	Aneta Paroubková	1.58 m (5 ft 2 in)	61 kg (134 lb)	10 January 2008 (age 18)	(Czech Republic) HC Meteor Třemošná U17
13	D	Veronika Hujová – A	1.69 m (5 ft 7 in)	69 kg (152 lb)	10 July 2007 (age 18)	(Austria) Neuburg Highlanders
15	F	Natálie Musilová	1.55 m (5 ft 1 in)	60 kg (130 lb)	27 April 2007 (age 19)	(Czech Republic) HC MAD BULL U17
16	F	Viktorie Jílková	1.75 m (5 ft 9 in)	60 kg (130 lb)	13 February 2007 (age 19)	(Czech Republic) HC Spartak Žebrák U20
17	D	Johanna Tischler	1.73 m (5 ft 8 in)	60 kg (130 lb)	13 February 2008 (age 18)	(Canada) OHA Tardiff U22
18	F	Tereza Gildainová	1.64 m (5 ft 5 in)	60 kg (130 lb)	31 January 2008 (age 18)	(United States) Lovell Academy Lions 16U
19	F	Lucie Štěpánová	1.71 m (5 ft 7 in)	66 kg (146 lb)	25 November 2007 (age 18)	(Canada) HTI Stars
20	F	Julie Jebousková	1.62 m (5 ft 4 in)	53 kg (117 lb)	16 February 2008 (age 18)	(United States) Shattuck-St. Mary's
21	F	Dana Březinová	1.69 m (5 ft 7 in)	63 kg (139 lb)	3 February 2009 (age 17)	(Czech Republic) HK Mladí Draci Šumperk U15
22	F	Ester Skálová-Rosenbaumová	1.61 m (5 ft 3 in)	58 kg (128 lb)	3 February 2009 (age 17)	(Czech Republic) Slavia Prague U15
24	F	Adéla Pánková	1.59 m (5 ft 3 in)	58 kg (128 lb)	19 April 2008 (age 18)	(United States) Pittsburgh Penguins Elite 19U
25	D	Tereza Štemberová	1.68 m (5 ft 6 in)	75 kg (165 lb)	2 March 2007 (age 19)	(Czech Republic) HC Berounští Medvědi U17
26	D	Ellen Jarabková	1.73 m (5 ft 8 in)	67 kg (148 lb)	21 January 2009 (age 17)	(Czech Republic) Hvězda Prague U15
27	F	Andrea Kantorová	1.70 m (5 ft 7 in)	69 kg (152 lb)	24 October 2008 (age 17)	(Czech Republic) HC Havlíčkův Brod U15
28	F	Magdaléna Felcmanová	1.78 m (5 ft 10 in)	80 kg (180 lb)	28 April 2007 (age 19)	(Finland) RoKi Rovaniemi
29	G	Anna Horáková	1.67 m (5 ft 6 in)	65 kg (143 lb)	29 October 2008 (age 17)	(Austria) EC Graz Huskies
30	G	Daniela Nováková	1.75 m (5 ft 9 in)	70 kg (150 lb)	18 March 2007 (age 19)	(Czech Republic) Hvězda Prague U17

Team biometrics

- Average age: 16 years
- Average height: 1.68 m (5 ft 6 in)
- Average weight: 65 kg (143 lb)

== Player awards and honors ==
=== World Championship ===
Best Forward
Selected by the tournament directorate

- 2024: Adéla Šapovalivová

Best Goaltender
Selected by the tournament directorate

- 2014: Klára Peslarová
- 2024: Aneta Šenková
- 2025: Daniela Nováková

All Stars
Selected by members of the media

- 2022: Adéla Šapovalivová (F)
- 2024: Adéla Šapovalivová (F), Aneta Šenková (G)

Top-3 Players on Team
Selected by the coaches

- 2008: Kateřina Bečevová (G), Alena Polenská (F), Kateřina Mrázová (F)
- 2009: Jana Fialová (D), Kateřina Mrázová (F), Monika Pěnčíková (G)
- 2010: Jana Fialová (D), Denisa Křížová (F), Kateřina Mrázová (F)
- 2011: Veronika Hladíková (G), Kateřina Solničková (F), Markéta Výtisková (D)
- 2012: Veronika Hladíková (G), Klára Hudečková (D), Denisa Křížová (F)
- 2013: Klárka Chmelová (F), Aneta Tejralová (D), Tereza Vanišová (F)
- 2014: Aneta Lédlová (F), Klára Peslarová (G), Vendula Přibylová (F)
- 2015: Michaela Pejzlová (F), Blanka Škodová (G), Martina Zedníková (D)
- 2016: Klára Hymlárová (F), Barbora Patočková (F), Anna Zíková (D)
- 2017: Magdalena Erbenová (D), Klára Hymlárová (F), Noemi Neubauerová (F)
- 2018: Kristýna Bláhová (G), Magdalena Erbenová (D), Kristýna Kaltounková (F)
- 2019: Sára Čajanová (D), Julie Pejšová (G), Adéla Škrdlová (D)
- 2020: Sára Čajanová (D), Daniela Pejšová (D), Viktorie Švejdová (G)
- 2022: Michaela Hesová (G), Adéla Šapovalivová (F), Andrea Trnková (D)
- 2023: Barbora Juříčková (F), Beáta Narovcová (D), Linda Vocetková (F)
- 2024: Anežka Čabelová (F), Tereza Plosová (F), Adéla Šapovalivová (F)
- 2025: Adéla Fromová (D), Daniela Nováková (G), Linda Vocetková (F)

== See also ==
- Czech Republic women's national ice hockey team
- Czech Women's Extraliga
