= Tereza Gildainová =

Czech ice hockey player (born 2008)

- Born: 31 January 2008 (age 18) Ústí nad Orlicí, Czech Republic
- Height: 5 ft 5 in (165 cm)
- Weight: 139 lb (63 kg; 9 st 13 lb)
- Position: Forward
- Shoots: Left
- USHS team: Lovell Academy
- National team: Czech Republic

Tereza Gildainová (born 31 January 2008) is a Czech ice hockey player for Lovell Academy and a member of Czechia women's national ice hockey team.

== International play ==
Medal record

Representing Czech Republic

World U18 Championship
Silver medal – second place	2024 Switzerland	
Bronze medal – third place	2025 Finland	
Bronze medal – third place	2026 Canada	

Paroubková made her IIHF U18 Women's World Championship debut for Czechia during the 2024 IIHF U18 Women's World Championship where she recorded one goal and three assists in six games and won a silver medal. She again represented the Czech Republic at the 2025 IIHF U18 Women's World Championship where she recorded two assists in six games and won a bronze medal. This was Czechia's best finish at the U18 Women's World Championship.

On 31 December 2025, she again selected to represent the Czech Republic at the 2026 IIHF U18 Women's World Championship. During the tournament she recorded one goal and four assists in six games and won a bronze medal. On 15 January 2026, during the quarterfinals against Switzerland, she scored the game-winning goal with under two minutes remaining to help Czechia advance to the semifinals.

In August 2026, she was named to the roster for Czechia at the 2026–27 Women's Euro Hockey Tour where she made her senior national team debut. On 1 November 2026, she was named to the roster for Czechia at the 2026 IIHF Women's World Championship.

== Career statistics ==
Year	Team	Event	Result	GP	G	A	Pts	PIM
2024	Czechia	U18	2nd place, silver medalist(s)	6	0	1	1	2
2025	Czechia	U18	3rd place, bronze medalist(s)	6	0	1	1	6
2026	Czechia	U18	3rd place, bronze medalist(s)	6	4	2	6	6
Junior totals				18	4	4	8	14
