= Aneta Paroubková =

Czech ice hockey player (born 2008)

- Born: 10 January 2008 (age 18) Plzeň, Czech Republic
- Height: 5 ft 3 in (160 cm)
- Weight: 143 lb (65 kg; 10 st 3 lb)
- Position: Defense
- Shoots: Left
- OWHL team: Stoney Creek Sabres
- National team: Czech Republic

Aneta Paroubková (born 10 January 2008) is a Czech junior ice hockey player for the Stoney Creek Sabres of the Ontario Women's Hockey League (OWHL) and a member of Czechia women's national ice hockey team.

== Playing career ==
Paroubková moved to Canada and joined Purcell Hockey Academy in 2025. She was named the 2025 Czech Junior Player of the Year.

== International play ==
Medal record

Representing Czech Republic

World U18 Championship
Silver medal – second place	2024 Switzerland	
Bronze medal – third place	2025 Finland	
Bronze medal – third place	2026 Canada	

Paroubková made her IIHF U18 Women's World Championship debut for Czechia during the 2024 IIHF U18 Women's World Championship where she recorded one goal and three assists in six games and won a silver medal. She again represented the Czech Republic at the 2025 IIHF U18 Women's World Championship where she recorded two assists in six games and won a bronze medal. On 31 December 2025, she was named alternate captain for Czechia at the 2026 IIHF U18 Women's World Championship. During the tournament she recorded one goal and four assists in six games and won a bronze medal.

In August 2026, she was named to the roster for Czechia at the 2026–27 Women's Euro Hockey Tour where she made her senior national team debut. On 1 November 2026, she was named to the roster for Czechia at the 2026 IIHF Women's World Championship.

== Career statistics ==
Year	Team	Event	Result	GP	G	A	Pts	PIM
2024	Czechia	U18	2nd place, silver medalist(s)	6	1	3	4	2
2025	Czechia	U18	3rd place, bronze medalist(s)	6	0	2	2	2
2026	Czechia	U18	3rd place, bronze medalist(s)	6	1	4	5	8
Junior totals				18	2	9	11	12
