= Tilde Grillfors =

Swedish ice hockey player (born 2008)

- Born: 3 July 2008 (age 18) Jönköping, Sweden
- Height: 165 cm (5 ft 5 in)
- Weight: 71 kg (157 lb; 11 st 3 lb)
- Position: Forward
- Shoots: Left
- SDHL team Former teams: Brynäs IF; Leksands IF.
- National team: Sweden
- Playing career: 2022–present
Medal record
World Championship
Bronze medal – third place	2026 Denmark

Tilde Sundnäs Grillfors (born 3 July 2008) is a Swedish ice hockey forward for Brynäs IF of the Swedish Women's Hockey League (SDHL) and member of the Sweden women's national ice hockey team. She previously played for Leksands IF.

== Playing career ==
Grillfors made her SDHL debut for Leksands IF during the 2022–23 season. On 15 May 2024, she signed a three-year contract with Brynäs IF.

She is committed to play college ice hockey at Ohio State during the 2027–28 season.

== International play ==
She represented Sweden at the 2024 Winter Youth Olympics where she led the team in scoring with four goals and two assists in four games. During the semifinals against Germany she two goals and one assist to help Sweden advance to the finals. During the finals against Japan she scored the opening goal just over nine minutes into the game. This served as the game-winning goal as Sweden won the gold medal.

She represented Sweden at the 2025 IIHF U18 Women's World Championship where she recorded one goal and three assists in six games. She again represented Sweden at the 2026 IIHF U18 Women's World Championship where she recorded four goals and three assists in six games.

On 19 August 2026, during the 2026–27 Women's Euro Hockey Tour, she made her senior national team debut against Switzerland. On 30 September 2026, against Switzerland, she recorded a hat-trick.

On 20 October 2026, she was selected to represent Sweden at the 2026 IIHF Women's World Championship. At 18 years old, she is the youngest player on the team. She recorded one goal and two assists in seven games to help Sweden win their first IIHF Women's World Championship medal since 2007.

== Career statistics ==
=== Regular season and playoffs ===
			Regular season					Playoffs
Season	Team	League	GP	G	A	Pts	PIM	GP	G	A	Pts	PIM
2022–23	Leksands IF	SDHL	7	0	1	1	2	3	0	1	1	0
2023–24	Leksands IF	SDHL	21	3	3	6	2	3	0	0	0	0
2024–25	Brynäs IF	SDHL	25	3	9	12	4	9	0	2	2	2
2025–26	Brynäs IF	SDHL	30	6	3	9	14	10	1	2	3	4
SDHL totals			83	12	16	28	22	25	1	5	6	6

=== International ===
Year	Team	Event	Result	GP	G	A	Pts	PIM
2025	Sweden	U18	4th	6	1	3	4	2
2026	Sweden	U18	4th	6	4	3	7	0
2026	Sweden	WC	3rd place, bronze medalist(s)	7	2	1	3	2
Junior totals				12	5	6	11	2
Senior totals				7	2	1	3	2
