= Hayley McDonald =

Canadian ice hockey player (born 2008)

- Born: January 7, 2008 (age 18) East St. Paul, Manitoba Canada
- Height: 5 ft 7 in (170 cm)
- Weight: 152 lb (69 kg; 10 st 12 lb)
- Position: Forward
- Shoots: Right
- WCHA team: Ohio State
- National team: Canada
Medal record
World Championships
Silver medal – second place	2026 Denmark

Hayley McDonald (born January 7, 2008) is a Canadian college ice hockey forward for the Ohio State Buckeyes of the National Collegiate Athletic Association (NCAA).

== Playing career ==
During the 2025–26 season, McDonald served as team captain for the RHA Kelowna U18 prep team of the Canadian Sport School Hockey League (CSSHL) and recorded 14 goals and 21 assists in 26 regular season games. During the playoffs she recorded seven goals and three assists in five games to help RHA Kelowna win their fifth consecutive CSSHL Western Championship. She led the Championships with seven goals, including scoring the opening goal in the finals against OHA Edmonton, and was subsequently named Playoff MVP. Following the season she was named the U18 Prep Top Defensive Forward Award winner. She finished her career with 86 points in 54 career games for RHA Kelowna in two seasons.

She began her college ice hockey at Ohio State during the 2026–27 season.

== International play ==
On December 10, 2024, she was selected to represent Canada at the 2025 IIHF U18 Women's World Championship. During the tournament she recorded four goals and three assists in six games and won a gold medal. On December 11, 2025, she was again selected to represent Canada at the 2026 IIHF U18 Women's World Championship where she served as team captain. During the tournament she recorded six goals and three assists in six games and won a silver medal.

On October 19, 2026, she was selected to represent Canada at the 2026 IIHF Women's World Championship, where she will make her senior national team debut.

== Career statistics ==
=== International ===
Year	Team	Event	Result	GP	G	A	Pts	PIM
2025	Canada	U18	1st place, gold medalist(s)	6	4	3	7	2
2026	Canada	U18	2nd place, silver medalist(s)	6	6	3	9	2
Junior totals				12	10	6	16	4
