= HC Hvězda Praha =

Ice hockey team

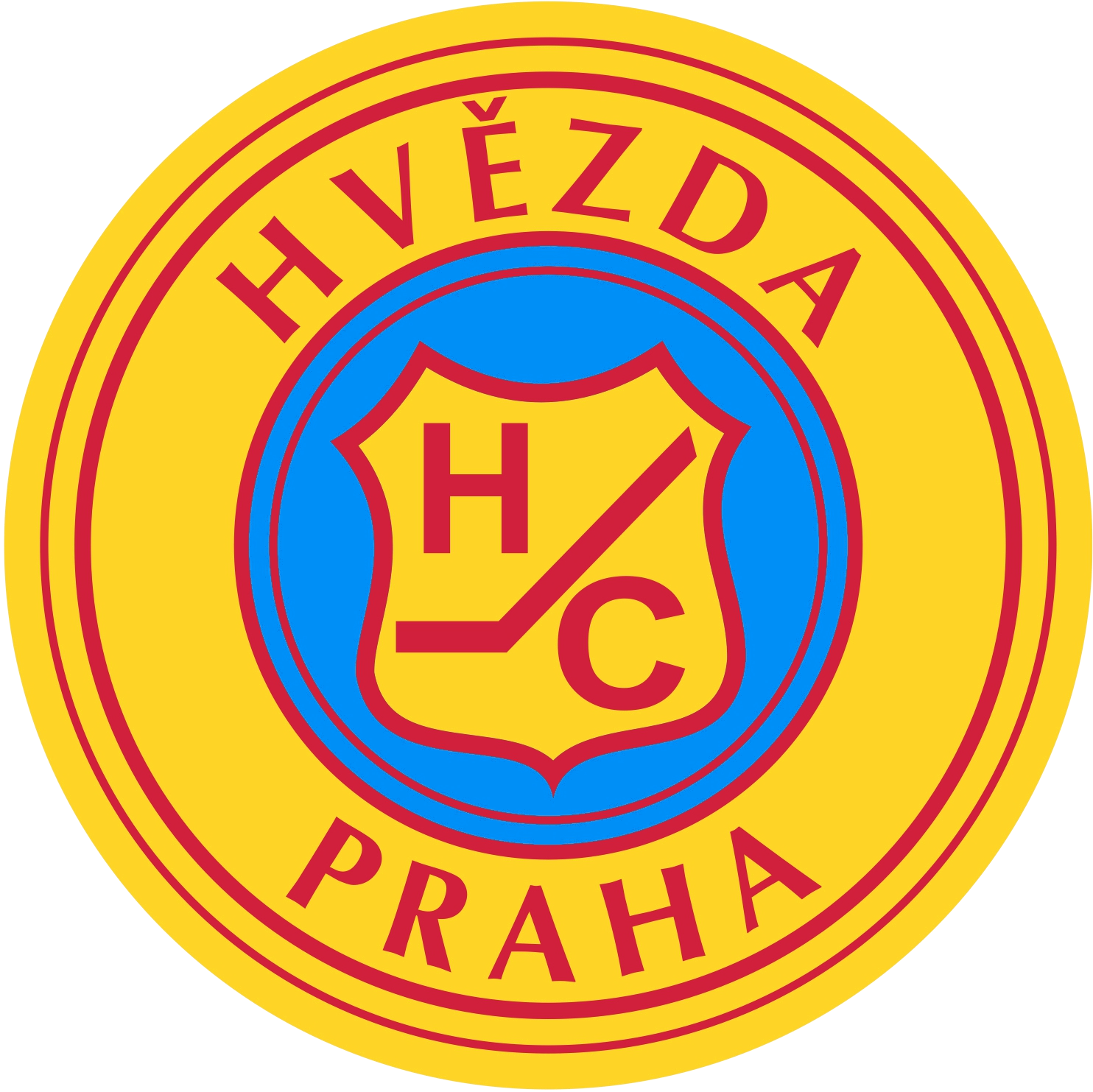
- City: Prague, Czech Republic
- League: Czech4 (Krajská liga)
- Founded: 1969
- Home arena: Zimní stadion Hvězda
- Colours: yellow, red, blue
- General manager: Ing. Michael Grim
- Website: hokejhvezda.cz

Franchise history
- 1969–1975: HC Praha
- 1975–1991: TJ Hvězda Praha
- 1991–1997: HC Praha
- 1997–present: HC Hvězda Praha

HC Hvězda Praha is a Czech ice hockey club based in Prague. Founded in 1969 under the name HC Praha, the club has been since then focused primarily on the development of talented youth and junior hockey players. Its men's team is currently playing in the 4th highest Czech hockey division.

== About the club ==
The club was founded with the original name HC Praha in 1969. In 1975 it has been renamed to TJ Hvězda Praha, with the club's name referring to the well-known Renaissance villa and national cultural monument Letohrádek Hvězda located nearby in the same municipal district of Prague 6. Since 1983, the club has been playing at its own ice rink in Vokovice, Prague 6.

Although the club has undergone a number of changes and reorganizations during its existence, it has transformed into one of the important and respected regional youth hockey hubs. In addition to the men's and veterans' teams, HC Hvězda Praha also has 12 youth and junior teams, in which more than 250 boys and girls from 5 to 20 years of age play. Since its foundation in 1969, the club's main mission has been the development of talented youth and junior hockey players – and has achieved some significant results in this. The club has raised several notable players who later experienced playing in the National Hockey League, Czech Republic men's national ice hockey team or Czech Republic women's national ice hockey team.

== Notable players ==
- Jan Hlaváč
- Ronald Knot
- David Kočí
- Dominika Lásková
- Noemi Neubauerová
- Radek Smoleňák
- Tomáš Urban
- Jiří Veber
