= United States women's national under-18 ice hockey team =

United States
- Nickname: Team USA
- Association: USA Hockey
- Head coach: Courtney Kennedy
- Assistants: Chris Bailey; Greg May; Makenna Newkirk
- Captain: Maggie Averill
- Top scorer: Kendall Coyne (22)
- Most points: Kendall Coyne (33)
- Team colors
- IIHF code: USA
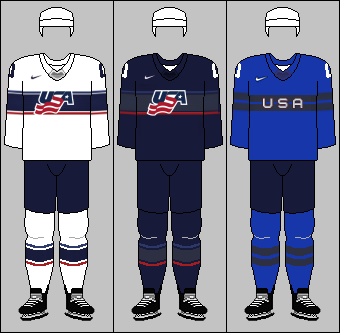

First international
- United States 11–0 Russia (Calgary, Canada; January 7, 2008)

Biggest win
- United States 18–0 Czech Republic (Füssen, Germany; January 9, 2009)

Biggest defeat
- Canada 5–1 United States (Budapest, Hungary; March 30, 2014)

IIHF U18 Women's World Championship
- Appearances: 18 (first in 2008)
- Best result: Gold: (2008, 2009, 2011, 2015, 2016, 2017, 2018, 2020, 2024, 2026)

Medal record

U18 Women's World Championship
Gold medal – first place	2008 Canada	Team
Gold medal – first place	2009 Germany	Team
Gold medal – first place	2011 Sweden	Team
Gold medal – first place	2015 United States	Team
Gold medal – first place	2016 Canada	Team
Gold medal – first place	2017 Czech Republic	Team
Gold medal – first place	2018 Russia	Team
Gold medal – first place	2020 Slovakia	Team
Gold medal – first place	2024 Switzerland	Team
Gold medal – first place	2026 Canada	Team
Silver medal – second place	2010 United States	Team
Silver medal – second place	2012 Czech Republic	Team
Silver medal – second place	2013 Finland	Team
Silver medal – second place	2014 Hungary	Team
Silver medal – second place	2019 Japan	Team
Silver medal – second place	2022 United States	Team
Silver medal – second place	2025 Finland	Team
Bronze medal – third place	2023 Sweden	Team

The United States women's national under-18 ice hockey team represents the United States at the IIHF U18 Women's World Championship.

== Competitive record ==
=== IIHF U18 Women's World Championship ===
The United States has won a medal in every IIHF U18 Women's World Championship they have participated in since 2008, including a record ten gold medals, currently in 2026.

Year	Result	Rank	GP	W	OTW	OTL	L	GF	GA	Pts
(Canada) 2008	Champions	1st place, gold medalist(s)	5	5	0	0	0	41	4	15
(Germany) 2009	Champions	1st place, gold medalist(s)	5	4	1	0	0	58	4	14
(United States) 2010	Runner-up	2nd place, silver medalist(s)	5	4	0	1	0	40	6	13
(Sweden) 2011	Champions	1st place, gold medalist(s)	5	5	0	0	0	47	4	15
(Czech Republic) 2012	Runner-up	2nd place, silver medalist(s)	5	4	0	0	1	35	5	12
(Finland) 2013	Runner-up	2nd place, silver medalist(s)	5	4	0	1	0	36	2	13
(Hungary) 2014	Runner-up	2nd place, silver medalist(s)	5	4	0	0	1	24	7	12
(United States) 2015	Champions	1st place, gold medalist(s)	5	3	2	0	0	20	4	13
(Canada) 2016	Champions	1st place, gold medalist(s)	5	4	1	0	0	23	3	14
(Czech Republic) 2017	Champions	1st place, gold medalist(s)	5	4	0	1	0	19	3	13
(Russia) 2018	Champions	1st place, gold medalist(s)	5	4	1	0	0	26	12	14
(Japan) 2019	Runner-up	2nd place, silver medalist(s)	5	4	0	1	0	17	8	13
(Slovakia) 2020	Champions	1st place, gold medalist(s)	5	3	1	0	1	11	4	11
(Sweden) 2021	Cancelled due to the COVID-19 pandemic									
(United States) 2022	Runner-up	2nd place, silver medalist(s)	5	4	0	0	1	23	6	12
(Sweden) 2023	Third place	3rd place, bronze medalist(s)	5	3	0	0	2	21	9	9
(Switzerland) 2024	Champions	1st place, gold medalist(s)	6	6	0	0	0	32	5	18
(Finland) 2025	Runner-up	2nd place, silver medalist(s)	6	5	0	0	1	25	5	15
(Canada) 2026	Champions	1st place, gold medalist(s)	6	6	0	0	0	56	2	18
Total	10 Titles	18/19	93	76	6	4	7	554	93	244

== Awards and honors ==
Year	Player	Award	Ref
2008	Alyssa Grogan	Directorate Award, Best Goaltender	
2009	Alex Rigsby	Directorate Award, Best Goaltender	
2009	Alev Kelter	Directorate Award, Best Defenseman	
2009	Amanda Kessel	Directorate Award, Best Forward	
2010	Alex Rigsby	Directorate Award, Best Goaltender	
2010	Kendall Coyne	Directorate Award, Best Forward	
2011	Milica McMillen	Directorate Award, Best Defenseman	
2011	Alex Carpenter	Directorate Award, Best Forward	
2012	Alex Carpenter	Directorate Award, Best Forward	
2013	Katherine Schipper	Directorate Award, Best Forward	
2014	Jincy Dunne	Directorate Award, Best Defenseman	
2014	Taylar Cianfarano	Directorate Award, Best Forward	
2015	Jincy Dunne	Directorate Award, Best Defenseman	
2015	Jincy Dunne	Media All-Star Team	
2015	Melissa Samoskevich	Media All-Star Team	
2016	Cayla Barnes	Directorate Award, Best Defenseman	
2016	Cayla Barnes	Media All-Star Team	
2017	Cayla Barnes	Directorate Award, Best Defenseman	
2018	Taylor Heise	Directorate Award, Best Forward	
2018	Taylor Heise	Media All-Star Team	
2018	Taylor Heise	Media Award, Most Valuable Player	
2018	Makenna Webster	Media All-Star Team	
2018	Gracie Ostertag	Directorate Award, Best Defenseman	
2019	Katy Knoll	Media All-Star Team	
2020	Lacey Eden	Media All-Star Team	
2022	Sydney Morrow	Media All-Star Team	
2022	Laila Edwards	Media All-Star Team	
2022	Laila Edwards	Tournament MVP	
2022	Laila Edwards	Directorate Award, Best Forward	
2023	Molly Jordan	Media All-Star Team	
2024	Josie St. Martin	Media All-Star Team	
2025	Anabella Fanale	Directorate Award, Best Forward	
2025	Anabella Fanale	Media All-Star Team	
2025	Megan Healy	Media All-Star Team	
2025	Morgan Stickney	Media All-Star Team	
2026	Maggie Averill	Media All-Star Team	
2026	Maggie Averill	Directorate Award, Best Defenseman	
2026	Jane Daley	Media All-Star Team	
2026	Jane Daley	Tournament MVP	
2026	Jane Daley	Directorate Award, Best Forward	

== Current roster ==
Roster for the 2026 U18 Series.

Head coach: Courtney Kennedy

No.	Pos.	Name	Height	Weight	Birthdate	Team
3	D	Taylee Manion — A	1.65 m (5 ft 5 in)	62 kg (137 lb)	November 12, 2009 (age 16)	(United States) Hill-Murray School
4	D	Noelle Noble	1.71 m (5 ft 7 in)	68 kg (150 lb)	March 3, 2009 (age 17)	(United States) Wayzata High School
6	D	Cassidy Cha	1.75 m (5 ft 9 in)	66 kg (146 lb)	April 26, 2010 (age 16)	(United States) Team Illinois
7	F	Madeline Call	1.65 m (5 ft 5 in)	64 kg (141 lb)	February 9, 2009 (age 17)	(United States) Thayer Academy
8	F	Lily Bromley	1.68 m (5 ft 6 in)	80 kg (180 lb)	February 2, 2009 (age 17)	(United States) Noble & Greenough School
9	D	Chyna Taylor — A	1.68 m (5 ft 6 in)	59 kg (130 lb)	July 10, 2009 (age 17)	(United States) Lovell Academy
12	F	Maddison Boone	1.73 m (5 ft 8 in)	73 kg (161 lb)	December 18, 2009 (age 16)	(United States) Woodbury High School
13	F	Frances Ames	1.71 m (5 ft 7 in)	70 kg (150 lb)	May 25, 2010 (age 16)	(United States) Noble & Greenough School
15	F	Delaney Miller	1.68 m (5 ft 6 in)	64 kg (141 lb)	April 27, 2009 (age 17)	(United States) Minnetonka High School
16	D	Alexis Ulrich	1.78 m (5 ft 10 in)	68 kg (150 lb)	April 9, 2010 (age 16)	(United States) Breck School
17	D	Reese Engel	1.71 m (5 ft 7 in)	70 kg (150 lb)	June 12, 2009 (age 17)	(United States) Noble & Greenough School
18	F	Jane Daley — C	1.71 m (5 ft 7 in)	58 kg (128 lb)	March 9, 2009 (age 17)	(United States) Shattuck-Saint Mary's
22	F	Amelia Sutch	1.78 m (5 ft 10 in)	66 kg (146 lb)	February 19, 2010 (age 16)	(United States) Centennial/Spring Lake Park High School
23	F	Aubryn Monter	1.63 m (5 ft 4 in)	57 kg (126 lb)	February 19, 2009 (age 17)	(United States) Lovell Academy
24	D	Margaret Chudzinski	1.71 m (5 ft 7 in)	72 kg (159 lb)	April 3, 2010 (age 16)	(United States) Dexter Southfield School
25	F	Hannah Rychley	1.63 m (5 ft 4 in)	64 kg (141 lb)	November 16, 2010 (age 15)	(United States) Hill-Murray School
26	F	Reese Unklesbay	1.65 m (5 ft 5 in)	59 kg (130 lb)	August 28, 2009 (age 16)	(United States) Hill-Murray School
27	F	Gia Orizotti	1.63 m (5 ft 4 in)	66 kg (146 lb)	November 19, 2009 (age 16)	(United States) Masters Academy International
30	G	Allie Callinan	1.71 m (5 ft 7 in)	64 kg (141 lb)	November 15, 2010 (age 15)	(United States) Holy Family Catholic High School
31	G	Emma Pieper	1.68 m (5 ft 6 in)	57 kg (126 lb)	January 7, 2010 (age 16)	(United States) East Grand Forks High School
32	F	Brooke Lakowske	1.63 m (5 ft 4 in)	59 kg (130 lb)	March 15, 2010 (age 16)	(United States) Shattuck-Saint Mary's
33	G	Cecilia Wielenberg	1.76 m (5 ft 9 in)	61 kg (134 lb)	March 6, 2009 (age 17)	(United States) Team Illinois
36	D	Nadiya Nadaud	1.63 m (5 ft 4 in)	64 kg (141 lb)	March 25, 2009 (age 17)	(United States) Little Caesars
37	F	Annabelle Lovell	1.63 m (5 ft 4 in)	50 kg (110 lb)	February 25, 2009 (age 17)	(United States) Lovell Academy
38	F	Bria Schilling	1.65 m (5 ft 5 in)	75 kg (165 lb)	October 16, 2009 (age 16)	(United States) Shattuck-Saint Mary's
