= Martina Volkánová =

Czech ice hockey player

- Born: 28 March 1998 (age 28) České Budějovice, Czech Republic
- Height: 1.70 m (5 ft 7 in)
- Weight: 71 kg (157 lb; 11 st 3 lb)
- Position: Defence
- Shot: Left
- ČSLH team Former teams: HC Příbram; HC Slavia Praha
- National team: Czech Republic
- Playing career: 2015–2020

Martina Volkánová, née Zedníková (born 28 March 1998) is a Czech ice hockey player for HC Příbram and the Czech national team.

Currently she is a Czech ice hockey referee.

She participated at the 2016 IIHF Women's World Championship. She graduated from the Pan-European University in Prague.
