= 2022–23 AHL season =

- League: American Hockey League
- Sport: Ice hockey
- Duration: October 14, 2022 – April 16, 2023

Regular season
- Macgregor Kilpatrick Trophy: Calgary Wranglers
- Season MVP: Dustin Wolf (Calgary Wranglers)
- Top scorer: Michael Carcone (Tucson Roadrunners)

Playoffs
- Playoffs MVP: Hunter Shepard (Hershey)

Calder Cup
- Champions: Hershey Bears
- Runners-up: Coachella Valley Firebirds

AHL seasons
- 2021–22 2023–24

The 2022–23 AHL season was the 87th season of the American Hockey League. The regular season began on October 14, 2022, and ended on April 16, 2023. The 2023 Calder Cup playoffs followed the conclusion of the regular season, and began on April 18, 2023. They concluded on June 21 with the Hershey Bears winning their 12th Calder Cup in team history, defeating the Coachella Valley Firebirds in overtime of game seven of the finals.

== League changes ==
After the previous regular season where teams played an imbalanced schedule consisting of 76, 72, or 68 games, all teams played an equal number of games at 72. The Macgregor Kilpatrick Trophy for the regular season champion will no longer be awarded based on points percentage, but rather total points. Qualification for the 2023 Calder Cup playoffs was decided by accumulation of points by team, with 23 teams making the cutoff.

For the first time since 2018, the league expanded, adding the Coachella Valley Firebirds. The Stockton Heat moved to Calgary in order to be closer to their NHL affiliate, the Calgary Flames. The Heat became the Calgary Wranglers. This brought the number of teams in the league to an all-time high of 32.

The AHL had 11 female on-ice officials as of the 2022–23 season, including Kelly Cooke, Katie Guay, Cianna Lieffers, and Kirsten Welsh.

=== Team and NHL affiliation changes ===
After the National Hockey League (NHL) added the Seattle Kraken for the 2021–22 season, the Kraken took a different approach than the 2017 expansion team, the Vegas Golden Knights. Seattle wanted to add an AHL expansion team for their first season, unlike Vegas. The Kraken had discussed the possibility of promoting the Idaho Steelheads from the ECHL, similar to what the league decided to do with the 2018 expansion team Colorado Eagles. However, Seattle chose to create their own expansion team in Thousand Palms, California. The team, named the Coachella Valley Firebirds, was originally scheduled to begin play during the 2021–22 AHL season, however the debut of the Firebirds was delayed by one year due to the COVID-19 pandemic delaying the construction of their arena. With Seattle having no AHL affiliate for their debut season, they decided to affiliate with the Charlotte Checkers as the secondary affiliate to the Florida Panthers.

The Firebirds organization will be taking the spot of the Stockton Heat in the Pacific Division. The Firebirds join other successful AHL franchises in the Southern California market, such as San Diego, Bakersfield, and Ontario. The Panthers will become the sole affiliate of the Checkers.

==== Relocations ====
- The Stockton Heat franchise was relocated to Calgary beginning with the 2022–23 season. The Heat had played the entire 2020–21 season at the Scotiabank Saddledome in Calgary due to the COVID-19 pandemic, with cross-border travel being restricted. On August 2, 2022, the team announced its name, bringing back the "Wranglers" moniker.

==== Affiliation changes ====
| AHL team | New affiliate (Note: Or an affiliate returning as a primary affiliate after an expansion team joined the league.) | Previous affiliate |
|---|---|---|
| Coachella Valley Firebirds | Seattle Kraken | Expansion team |
| Charlotte Checkers | Florida Panthers (Note: The Panthers had shared the Checkers with the Kraken during the 2021–22 season. Florida will be returning as their primary affiliate, as Seattle has their own expansion team affiliate.) | Seattle Kraken |

=== Coaching changes ===
Off–season
| Team | 2021–22 coach | 2022–23 coach | Notes |
|---|---|---|---|
| Abbotsford Canucks | Trent Cull | Jeremy Colliton | On July 1, 2022, the Vancouver Canucks promoted Cull to assistant coach under head coach Bruce Boudreau. Colliton was named as head coach for Abbotsford on the same day. |
| Bakersfield Condors | Jay Woodcroft; Colin Chaulk (interim) | Colin Chaulk | On February 10, 2022, Woodcroft was promoted to Edmonton following the firing of Oilers' head coach Dave Tippett. Condors' assistant coach Chaulk was named the interim head coach the following day. Bakersfield removed the interim tag from Chaulk and named him as head coach for the 2022–23 season. |
| Calgary Wranglers | Relocated from Stockton | Mitch Love | As the Calgary Flames relocated the Stockton Heat to Calgary, the Flames retained Love as their head coach for the Wranglers. |
| Chicago Wolves | Ryan Warsofsky | Brock Sheahan | On July 28, 2022, the San Jose Sharks hired Warsofsky as an assistant coach. |
| Cleveland Monsters | Mike Eaves | Trent Vogelhuber | On April 30, 2022, Eaves would be stepping away from his position as head coach of the Monsters following the conclusion of the 2021–22 season. On June 8, 2022, the Monsters named Vogelhuber as head coach. Vogelhuber had been serving as an assistant coach with the Monsters since his retirement in 2018. |
| Coachella Valley Firebirds | Expansion team | Dan Bylsma | Bylsma served as an assistant coach with then-Seattle AHL affiliate, the Charlotte Checkers, during the 2021–22 season. On June 21, 2022, Bylsma was named as head coach of the Firebirds. |
| Hershey Bears | Scott Allen | Todd Nelson | On July 27, 2022, Allen was named as an assistant coach with the Bears NHL affiliate, the Washington Capitals. |
| Ontario Reign | John Wroblewski; Chris Hajt (interim); Craig Johnson (interim) | Marco Sturm | After taking time away from the Reign on a personal leave of absence, it was mutually determined on March 11, 2022, between the Reign and Wroblewski that Wroblewski would not return as head coach of the Reign. Hajt and Johnson were named co-head coaches for the remainder of the season. On June 17, 2022, Sturm was named as head coach of the Reign, previously serving as assistant coach with the Reign's NHL affiliate, the Los Angeles Kings. |
| Rockford IceHogs | Derek King; Anders Sorensen (interim) | Anders Sorensen | On November 6, 2021, King was promoted to Chicago following the firing of Blackhawks head coach Jeremy Colliton. On July 12, 2022, the interim tag was removed from Sorensen as was named head coach for the 2022–23 season. |
| San Diego Gulls | Joel Bouchard | Roy Sommer | On May 11, 2022, it was announced that the Anaheim Ducks had parted ways with Bouchard as the Gulls head coach. Sommer was named as head coach of the Gulls on July 12, 2022, after initially being transitioned to a senior advisory role with the San Jose Barracuda. |
| San Jose Barracuda | Roy Sommer | John McCarthy | On May 18, 2022, Sommer transitioned to a senior advisory role with the Barracuda. On the same day, McCarthy was named as head coach of the Barracuda. Sommer was later named as head coach of the San Diego Gulls. |
| Tucson Roadrunners | Jay Varady | Steve Potvin | On July 18, 2022, Varady was named as an assistant coach with the Detroit Red Wings. |
In-season
| Team | Outgoing coach | Incoming coach | Notes |
| Belleville Senators | Troy Mann | David Bell (interim) | On February 2, 2022, following the Senators game vs the Rochester Americans, Mann was relieved from duties as head coach. Assistant coach David Bell was named as interim head coach the same night. |

== Final standings ==
y– indicates team clinched division and a playoff spot
x– indicates team clinched a playoff spot
e– indicates team was eliminated from playoff contention

Standings as of April 16, 2023

=== Eastern Conference ===
| Atlantic Division | GP | W | L | OTL | SOL | Pts | Pts% | GF | GA |
|---|---|---|---|---|---|---|---|---|---|
| y–Providence Bruins (BOS) | 72 | 44 | 18 | 8 | 2 | 98 | .681 | 221 | 201 |
| x–Hershey Bears (WSH) | 72 | 44 | 19 | 5 | 4 | 97 | .674 | 217 | 184 |
| x–Charlotte Checkers (FLA) | 72 | 39 | 25 | 5 | 3 | 86 | .597 | 235 | 220 |
| x–Springfield Thunderbirds (STL) | 72 | 38 | 26 | 3 | 5 | 84 | .583 | 230 | 211 |
| x–Hartford Wolf Pack (NYR) | 72 | 35 | 26 | 4 | 7 | 81 | .563 | 227 | 215 |
| x–Lehigh Valley Phantoms (PHI) | 72 | 37 | 29 | 3 | 3 | 80 | .556 | 221 | 226 |
| e–Bridgeport Islanders (NYI) | 72 | 34 | 30 | 7 | 1 | 74 | .528 | 238 | 248 |
| e–Wilkes-Barre/Scranton Penguins (PIT) | 72 | 26 | 32 | 8 | 6 | 66 | .458 | 191 | 224 |

| North Division | GP | W | L | OTL | SOL | Pts | Pts% | GF | GA |
|---|---|---|---|---|---|---|---|---|---|
| y–Toronto Marlies (TOR) | 72 | 42 | 24 | 4 | 2 | 90 | .625 | 229 | 225 |
| x–Syracuse Crunch (TBL) | 72 | 35 | 26 | 7 | 4 | 81 | .563 | 252 | 239 |
| x–Rochester Americans (BUF) | 72 | 36 | 27 | 6 | 3 | 81 | .563 | 236 | 233 |
| x–Utica Comets (NJD) | 72 | 35 | 27 | 6 | 4 | 80 | .556 | 215 | 222 |
| x–Laval Rocket (MTL) | 72 | 33 | 29 | 7 | 3 | 76 | .528 | 258 | 247 |
| e–Cleveland Monsters (CBJ) | 72 | 33 | 32 | 5 | 2 | 73 | .507 | 220 | 254 |
| e–Belleville Senators (OTT) | 72 | 31 | 31 | 6 | 4 | 72 | .500 | 233 | 258 |

=== Western Conference ===
| Central Division | GP | W | L | OTL | SOL | Pts | Pts% | GF | GA |
|---|---|---|---|---|---|---|---|---|---|
| y–Texas Stars (DAL) | 72 | 40 | 20 | 9 | 3 | 92 | .639 | 265 | 210 |
| x–Milwaukee Admirals (NSH) | 72 | 41 | 24 | 5 | 2 | 89 | .618 | 238 | 211 |
| x–Manitoba Moose (WPG) | 72 | 37 | 25 | 6 | 4 | 84 | .583 | 227 | 226 |
| x–Iowa Wild (MIN) | 72 | 34 | 27 | 6 | 5 | 79 | .549 | 211 | 211 |
| x–Rockford IceHogs (CHI) | 72 | 35 | 28 | 5 | 4 | 79 | .549 | 214 | 232 |
| e–Chicago Wolves (CAR) | 72 | 35 | 29 | 5 | 3 | 78 | .542 | 227 | 245 |
| e–Grand Rapids Griffins (DET) | 72 | 28 | 36 | 4 | 4 | 64 | .444 | 194 | 255 |

| Pacific Division | GP | W | L | OTL | SOL | Pts | Pts% | GF | GA |
|---|---|---|---|---|---|---|---|---|---|
| y–Calgary Wranglers (CGY) | 72 | 51 | 17 | 3 | 1 | 106 | .736 | 256 | 174 |
| x–Coachella Valley Firebirds (SEA) | 72 | 48 | 17 | 5 | 2 | 103 | .715 | 257 | 194 |
| x–Colorado Eagles (COL) | 72 | 40 | 22 | 7 | 3 | 90 | .625 | 210 | 187 |
| x–Abbotsford Canucks (VAN) | 72 | 40 | 25 | 3 | 4 | 87 | .604 | 229 | 203 |
| x–Bakersfield Condors (EDM) | 72 | 37 | 31 | 2 | 2 | 78 | .542 | 212 | 212 |
| x–Ontario Reign (LAK) | 72 | 34 | 32 | 5 | 1 | 74 | .514 | 206 | 211 |
| x–Tucson Roadrunners (ARI) | 72 | 30 | 33 | 8 | 1 | 69 | .479 | 219 | 245 |
| e–San Jose Barracuda (SJS) | 72 | 31 | 34 | 2 | 5 | 69 | .479 | 205 | 249 |
| e–Henderson Silver Knights (VGK) | 72 | 29 | 38 | 0 | 5 | 63 | .438 | 201 | 221 |
| e–San Diego Gulls (ANA) | 72 | 20 | 49 | 2 | 1 | 43 | .299 | 180 | 281 |

== Statistical leaders ==
=== Leading skaters ===
The following players are sorted by points, then goals. As of April 16, 2023.

GP = Games played; G = Goals; A = Assists; Pts = Points; +/– = P Plus–minus; PIM = Penalty minutes

| Player | Team | GP | G | A | Pts | PIM |
|---|---|---|---|---|---|---|
| Michael Carcone | Tucson Roadrunners | 65 | 31 | 54 | 85 | 127 |
| Alex Barre-Boulet | Syracuse Crunch | 69 | 24 | 60 | 84 | 58 |
| T. J. Tynan | Ontario Reign | 72 | 8 | 73 | 81 | 44 |
| Chris Terry | Bridgeport Islanders | 67 | 27 | 51 | 78 | 72 |
| Matthew Phillips | Calgary Wranglers | 66 | 36 | 40 | 76 | 12 |
| Rocco Grimaldi | San Diego / Rockford | 70 | 33 | 40 | 73 | 43 |
| Trey Fix-Wolansky | Cleveland Monsters | 61 | 29 | 42 | 71 | 40 |
| Logan Shaw | Toronto Marlies | 69 | 21 | 48 | 69 | 36 |
| Anthony Richard | Laval Rocket | 60 | 30 | 37 | 67 | 46 |
| Max McCormick | Coachella Valley Firebirds | 71 | 28 | 39 | 67 | 76 |

=== Leading goaltenders ===
The following goaltenders with a minimum 1,440 minutes played lead the league in goals against average. As of April 16, 2023.

GP = Games played; TOI = Time on ice (in minutes); SA = Shots against; GA = Goals against; SO = Shutouts; GAA = Goals against average; SV% = Save percentage; W = Wins; L = Losses; OT = Overtime/shootout loss

| Player | Team | GP | TOI | SA | GA | SO | GAA | SV% | W | L | OT |
|---|---|---|---|---|---|---|---|---|---|---|---|
| Dustin Wolf | Calgary Wranglers | 55 | 3,238:56 | 1,653 | 113 | 7 | 2.09 | .932 | 42 | 10 | 2 |
| Hunter Shepard | Hershey Bears | 33 | 1,930:24 | 835 | 70 | 1 | 2.18 | .916 | 20 | 8 | 5 |
| Jonas Johansson | Colorado Eagles | 26 | 1,545:22 | 747 | 60 | 0 | 2.33 | .920 | 14 | 9 | 2 |
| Matt Murray | Texas Stars | 34 | 1,925:15 | 853 | 76 | 3 | 2.37 | .911 | 18 | 10 | 5 |
| Joey Daccord | Coachella Valley Firebirds | 38 | 2,269:09 | 1,100 | 90 | 3 | 2.38 | .918 | 26 | 8 | 3 |

== Calder Cup playoffs ==
=== Playoff format ===
The AHL will continue to use the same playoff format used in the previous playoffs. The playoff field will include the top six finishers in the eight-team Atlantic Division, the top five finishers each in the seven-team North and Central Divisions, and the top seven teams in the 10-team Pacific Division. First Round match-ups will be best-of-three series; the two highest seeds in the Atlantic, the three highest seeds in each of the North and Central, and the first-place team in the Pacific will receive byes into the best-of-five Division Semifinals, with the First Round winners re-seeded in each division. The Division Finals will also be best-of-five series, followed by best-of-seven Conference Finals and a best-of-seven Calder Cup Finals series.

=== Bracket ===
First Round; April 18 – 23
A3 | Charlotte | 2
A6 | Lehigh Valley | 1
A4 | Springfield | 0
A5 | Hartford | 2
N4 | Utica | 2
N5 | Laval | 0
C4 | Iowa | 0
C5 | Rockford | 2
P4 | Abbotsford | 2
P5 | Bakersfield | 0
P2 | Coachella Valley | 2
P7 | Tucson | 1
P3 | Colorado | 2
P6 | Ontario | 0

Division Semifinals; April 21 – May 6
A1 | Providence | 1
A5 | Hartford | 3
Atlantic Division
A2 | Hershey | 3
A3 | Charlotte | 1
N1 | Toronto | 3
N4 | Utica | 1
North Division
N2 | Syracuse | 2
N3 | Rochester | 3
C1 | Texas | 3
C5 | Rockford | 0
Central Division
C2 | Milwaukee | 3
C3 | Manitoba | 2
P1 | Calgary | 3
P4 | Abbotsford | 1
Pacific Division
P2 | Coachella Valley | 3
P3 | Colorado | 2

Division Finals; May 11 – May 21
A5 | Hartford | 0
A2 | Hershey | 3
Eastern Conference
N1 | Toronto | 0
N3 | Rochester | 3
C1 | Texas | 2
C2 | Milwaukee | 3
Western Conference
P1 | Calgary | 2
P2 | Coachella Valley | 3

Conference Finals; May 23 – June 5
A2 | Hershey | 4
N3 | Rochester | 2
C2 | Milwaukee | 2
P2 | Coachella Valley | 4

Calder Cup Finals; June 8 – 21
A2 | Hershey | 4
P2 | Coachella Valley | 3

== AHL awards ==
| Award | Winner |
|---|---|
| Calder Cup | Hershey Bears |
| Les Cunningham Award | Dustin Wolf, Calgary Wranglers |
| John B. Sollenberger Trophy | Michael Carcone, Tucson Roadrunners |
| Willie Marshall Award | Andy Andreoff, Bridgeport Islanders |
| Dudley "Red" Garrett Memorial Award | Tye Kartye, Coachella Valley Firebirds |
| Eddie Shore Award | Christian Wolanin, Abbotsford Canucks |
| Aldege "Baz" Bastien Memorial Award | Dustin Wolf, Calgary Wranglers |
| Harry "Hap" Holmes Memorial Award | Dustin Wolf, Calgary Wranglers |
| Louis A. R. Pieri Memorial Award | Mitch Love, Calgary Wranglers |
| Fred T. Hunt Memorial Award | Logan Shaw, Toronto Marlies |
| Yanick Dupre Memorial Award | Jimmy Oligny, Manitoba Moose |
| Jack A. Butterfield Trophy | Hunter Shepard, Hershey Bears |
| Richard F. Canning Trophy | Hershey Bears |
| Robert W. Clarke Trophy | Coachella Valley Firebirds |
| Macgregor Kilpatrick Trophy | Calgary Wranglers |
| Frank Mathers Trophy (Eastern Conference regular season champions) | Providence Bruins |
| Norman R. "Bud" Poile Trophy (Western Conference regular season champions) | Calgary Wranglers |
| Emile Francis Trophy (Atlantic Division regular season champions) | Providence Bruins |
| F. G. "Teddy" Oke Trophy (North Division regular season champions) | Toronto Marlies |
| Sam Pollock Trophy (Central Division regular season champions) | Texas Stars |
| John D. Chick Trophy (Pacific Division regular season champions) | Calgary Wranglers |
| James C. Hendy Memorial Award | Bryan Helmer |
| Thomas Ebright Memorial Award | Mark Bernard |
| James H. Ellery Memorial Awards | |
| Ken McKenzie Award | Sebastien Vaillant |
| Michael Condon Memorial Award | Jud Ritter |
| President's Awards | Organization: Coachella Valley Firebirds; Player: Dustin Wolf, Calgary Wranglers |

=== All-Star teams ===
First All-Star Team

- Dustin Wolf (G) – Calgary
- Darren Raddysh (D) – Syracuse
- Christian Wolanin (D) – Abbotsford
- Alex Barre-Boulet (F) – Syracuse
- Michael Carcone (F) – Tucson
- Matthew Phillips (F) – Calgary

Second All-Star Team

- Joel Hofer (G) – Springfield
- Lucas Carlsson (D) – Charlotte
- Brogan Rafferty (D) – Coachella Valley
- Trey Fix-Wolansky (F) – Cleveland
- Max McCormick (F) – Coachella Valley
- T. J. Tynan (F) – Ontario

All-Rookie Team

- Brandon Bussi (G) – Providence
- Ryker Evans (D) – Coachella Valley
- Jeremie Poirier (D) – Calgary
- Ethen Frank (F) – Hershey
- Tye Kartye (F) – Coachella Valley
- Georgii Merkulov (F) – Providence
