= 2014 IIHF U18 Women's World Championship =

Tournament details
- Host country: Hungary
- Venues: 2 (in 1 host city)
- Dates: 23–30 March 2014
- Teams: 8

Final positions
- Champions: Canada (4th title)
- Runners-up: United States
- Third place: Czech Republic
- Fourth place: Russia

Tournament statistics
- Games played: 21
- Goals scored: 106 (5.05 per game)
- Attendance: 9,088 (433 per game)
- Scoring leader: (Canada) Sarah Potomak (9 points)

The 2014 IIHF U18 Women's World Championships was the seventh IIHF U18 Women's World Championship. Organized by the International Ice Hockey Federation (IIHF), the ice hockey tournament was played at two rinks of the Jégpalota (lit. 'Ice Palace'; called 'Icecenter' in IIHF documents) in Budapest, Hungary, from 23 to 30 March 2014.

== Top Division ==
=== Preliminary round ===
==== Group A ====
Team	Pld	W	OTW	OTL	L	GF	GA	GD	Pts	Qualification
Canada	3	3	0	0	0	19	1	+18	9	Advance to Semifinals
Czech Republic	3	1	1	0	1	7	9	−2	5	Advance to Quarterfinals
Finland	3	1	0	1	1	7	13	−6	4	Advance to Quarterfinals
Japan	3	0	0	0	3	4	14	−10	0	Relegation round

Source: IIHF

23 March 2014; 14:00	Czech Republic	4–3 GWS (2–2, 1–0, 0–1) (OT: 0–0) (SO: 1–0)	Finland	Icecenter Rink 2, Budapest; Attendance: 125

Game reference

Klára Peslarová
Goalies
Anni Keisala
Referee:
(Sweden) Gabriella Gran
Linesmen:
(Sweden) Veronica Johansson
(Denmark) Malene Skovbakke

	0–1	02:38 - M. Nilsson
A. Lédlová (V. Přibylová) - 13:23	1–1
	1–2	14:39 - E. Nuutinen (M. Nilsson, E. Savander)
B. Patočková (M. Walicová) (PP) - 15:20	2–2
K. Bukolská (D. Vopravilová) - 21:19	3–2
	3–3	47:43 - S. Säkkinen (E. Nuutinen) (PP)

D. Lásková
S. Kolowratová (miss)
A. Lédlová (miss)
Shootout
(miss) M. Nilsson
(miss) E. Nuutinen
(miss) E. Rakkolainen
6 min
Penalties
10 min
40
Shots
28

23 March 2014; 18:00	Canada	7–1 (3–1, 2–0, 2–0)	Japan	Icecenter Rink 1, Budapest; Attendance: 245

Game reference

Kassidy Sauvé
Goalies
Aya Kamimura
Ayu Tonosaki
Referee:
(Slovakia) Mária Zemiaková
Linesmen:
(Austria) Bettina Angerer
(Finland) Jenni Heikkinen

V. Bach (L. Wildfang, A. MacMillan) - 08:09	1–0
	1–1	08:42 - S. Taka (C. Soda)
È-A. Picard (S. Lalancette) - 12:54	2–1
S. Potomak (L. Wildfang) (PP) - 16:51	3–1
S. Cogan (S. Potomak, V. Bach) - 25:36	4–1
V. Bach (S. Potomak) (SH) - 36:16	5–1
R. Leslie (A. MacMillan, L. Wildfang) (PP) - 40:29	6-1
H. Miller (K. Heffernan) (PP) - 42:50	7-1

12 min
Penalties
14 min
65
Shots
22

24 March 2014; 14:00	Czech Republic	3–1 (2–1, 1–0, 0–0)	Japan	Icecenter Rink 2, Budapest; Attendance: 96

Game reference

Klára Peslarová
Goalies
Ayu Tonosaki
Referee:
(United States) Katie Guay
Linesmen:
(Slovakia) Jana Habánová
(Estonia) Kaire Leet

V. Přibylová (D. Lásková) - 02:47	1–0
	1–1	18:09 - S. Taka (C. Soda) (PP)
D. Lásková - 18:18	2–1
T. Vanišová (A. Tejralová) - 21:13	3–1

10 min
Penalties
2 min
47
Shots
24

24 March 2014; 15:00	Finland	0–7 (0–2, 0–5, 0–0)	Canada	Icecenter Rink 1, Budapest; Attendance: 115

Game reference

Anni Keisala
Goalies
Shea Tiley
Referee:
(Czech Republic) Drahomíra Fialová
Linesmen:
(United States) Kate Connolly
(Norway) Anna Nygård

0–1	05:03 - S. Potomak (PP)
0–2	10:53 - S. Lalancette (S. Fieseler, È-A. Picard)
0–3	26:44 - È-A. Picard
0–4	35:08 - V. Bach (S. Potomak)
0–5	37:18 - J. Healey (B. Wilson-Bennett)
0–6	38:00 - R. Leslie (S. Potomak)
0–7	39:44 - A. Labelle (J. Healey)

6 min
Penalties
4 min
22
Shots
59

26 March 2014; 14:00	Japan	2–4 (0-1, 0-1, 2-2)	Finland	Icecenter Rink 2, Budapest; Attendance: 132

Game reference

Ayu Tonosaki
Goalies
Anni Keisala
Referee:
(Canada) Meghan Mallette
Linesmen:
(Slovakia) Jana Habánová
(Canada) Jennifer McMahon

	0–1	00:37 - E. Rakkolainen (R. Savolainen, E. Savander)
	0–2	22:52 - S. Käyhkö (A. Kaitala, N. Salomäki)
R. Ukita (C. Tomita) - 40:41	1–2
R. Ukita (C. Miyazaki, H. Toko) - 45:40	2–2
	2–3	52:39 - E. Rakkolainen (M. Nilsson, E. Nuutinen)
	2–4	59:15 - M. Nilsson (E. Nuutinen)

4 min
Penalties
4 min
38
Shots
33

26 March 2014; 15:00	Canada	5–0 (0-0, 2-0, 3-0)	Czech Republic	Icecenter Rink 1, Budapest; Attendance: 202

Game reference

Kassidy Sauvé
Goalies
Klára Peslarová
Referee:
(Germany) Ramona Weiss
Linesmen:
(Sweden) Veronica Johansson
(Estonia) Kaire Leet

V. Bach (B. Wilson-Bennett, S. Lalancette) - 31:42	1–0
L. Wildfang (R. Leslie, H. Miller) - 32:45	2–0
È-A. Picard (S. Lalancette) - 44:05	3–0
S. Potomak (V. Bach, R. Leslie) (PP) - 48:16	4–0
L. Wildfang (A. MacMillan, A. Labelle) - 57:05	5–0

6 min
Penalties
10 min
43
Shots
23

==== Group B ====
Team	Pld	W	OTW	OTL	L	GF	GA	GD	Pts	Qualification
United States	3	3	0	0	0	20	1	+19	9	Advance to Semifinals
Russia	3	2	0	0	1	9	8	+1	6	Advance to Quarterfinals
Sweden	3	1	0	0	2	6	13	−7	3	Advance to Quarterfinals
Hungary	3	0	0	0	3	2	15	−13	0	Relegation round

Source: IIHF

23 March 2014; 14:30	Sweden	5–1 (1–0, 2–0, 2–1)	Hungary	Icecenter Rink 1, Budapest; Attendance: 1,620

Game reference

Sarah Berglind
Goalies
Anikó Németh
Referee:
(Canada) Meghan Mallette
Linesmen:
(United States) Kate Connolly
(Estonia) Kaire Leet

D. Husak Asp (J. Adolfsson) (PP) - 02:39	1–0
F. Gradin (A. Bäckebo, V. Samuelsson) - 27:47	2–0
D. Husak Asp (J. Adolfsson, E. Strandberg) (PP) - 36:15	3–0
M. Wernblom (S. Hjalmarsson, T. Svensson) - 48:24	4–0
	4–1	51:12 - D. Medgyes (B. Németh)
A. Helgöstam (E. Benn, A. Södergren) - 57:20	5–1

8 min
Penalties
12 min
37
Shots
29

23 March 2014; 17:30	United States	6–1 (2–0, 3–0, 1–1)	Russia	Icecenter Rink 2, Budapest; Attendance: 146

Game reference

Erin O'Neil
Goalies
Valeria Tarakanova
Nadezhda Morozova
Referee:
(Germany) Ramona Weiss
Linesmen:
(Canada) Jennifer McMahon
(Norway) Anna Nygård

M. Rodgers (G. Bizal) - 06:55	1–0
T. Williamson (M. Keller, R. Gilmore) - 12:18	2–0
B. Wellhausen (J. Dunne, M. Rolfes) - 29:38	3–0
T. Cianfarano (A. Laing, G. Zarzecki) - 32:01	4–0
S. Skarzynski (B. Ahbe, M. Samoskevich) - 33:18	5–0
M. Rodgers (B. Wellhausen, A. Roque) - 42:24	6–0
	6–1	53:42 - A. Shokhina (D. Tereshkina)

2 min
Penalties
10 min
54
Shots
17

24 March 2014; 17:30	Sweden	1–5 (1-1, 0-2, 0-2)	Russia	Icecenter Rink 2, Budapest; Attendance: 149

Game reference

Sarah Berglind
Goalies
Nadezhda Morozova
Referee:
(Slovakia) Mária Zemiaková
Linesmen:
(Finland) Jenni Heikkinen
(Denmark) Malene Skovbakke

D. Husak Asp (H. Olsson) (PP) - 09:06	1–0
	1–1	11:29 - A. Shokhina (A. Shtaryova) (PP)
	1–2	28:27 - F. Kadirova (K. Verkhovtseva)
	1–3	33:35 - A. Chistyakova (M. Batalova) (PP2)
	1–4	44:19 - A. Shokhina (D. Tereshkina) (PP)
	1–5	49:03 - A. Shtaryova (PS)

28 min
Penalties
18 min
26
Shots
49

24 March 2014; 18:30	Hungary	0–7 (0-3, 0-2, 0-2)	United States	Icecenter Rink 1, Budapest; Attendance: 1,115

Game reference

Anikó Németh
Goalies
Kaitlin Burt
Referee:
(Sweden) Gabriella Gran
Linesmen:
(Sweden) Veronica Johansson
(Canada) Jennifer McMahon

0–1	01:25 - T. Cianfarano (A. Laing)
0–2	14:50 - A. Roque (M. Rodgers)
0–3	16:45 - R. Gilmore (T. Williamson)
0–4	31:47 - V. Sullivan (G. Bizal)
0–5	35:41 - M. Keller (T. Williamson, S. Baldwin) (PP)
0–6	57:31 - T. Cianfarano (A. Laing, M. Kent)
0–7	59:57 - T. Williamson (C. Lonergan, R. Gilmore)

8 min
Penalties
2 min
5
Shots
72

26 March 2014; 17:30	United States	7–0 (1-0, 4-0, 2-0)	Sweden	Icecenter Rink 2, Budapest; Attendance: 142

Game reference

Erin O'Neil
Goalies
Julia Åberg
Referee:
(Czech Republic) Drahomíra Fialová
Linesmen:
(Austria) Bettina Angerer
(Denmark) Malene Skovbakke

T. Cianfarano (M. Samoskevich) - 15:17	1–0
M. Rodgers (S. Baldwin, B. Wellhausen) - 21:59	2–0
A. Laing (M. Rolfes) - 34:47	3–0
S. Skarzynski (B. Ahbe) - 37:07	4–0
T. Cianfarano (J. Dunne, M. Rolfes) - 37:37	5–0
A. Laing (M. Keller) - 51:12	6–0
T. Cianfarano (A. Roque) - 59:43	7–0

2 min
Penalties
2 min
58
Shots
13

26 March 2014; 18:30	Russia	3–1 (1-1, 2-0, 0-0)	Hungary	Icecenter Rink 1, Budapest; Attendance: 1,645

Game reference

Referee:
(United States) Katie Guay
Linesmen:
(Finland) Jenni Heikkinen
(Norway) Anna Nygård

	0–1	02:28 - T. Horváth (R. Ungár)
M. Bodrikova (F. Kadirova) - 07:28	1–1
N. Pirogova (A. Shtaryova) - 27:11	2–1
A. Shokhina (A. Shtaryova) (PP) - 30:54	3–1

2 min
Penalties
8 min
43
Shots
15

=== Relegation round ===
The teams played a best-of-three series.

27 March; 18:30	Japan	4 – 3 (1-0, 3-2, 0-1)	Hungary	Icecenter Rink 1, Budapest; Attendance: 620

Game reference

Aya Kammimura
Goalies
Anikó Németh
Referee:
(Canada) Meghan Mallette
Linesmen:
(Estonia) Kaire Leet
(Denmark) Malene Skovbakke

C. Miyazaki (R. Ukita, H. Toko) – 06:41	1–0
	1–1	25:01 – L. Pintér (D. Medgyes) (PP1)
	1–2	26:27 – T. Horváth (K. Krivi, L. Pintér)
M. Tsukimoto – 28:58	2–2
R. Ukita (C. Miyazaki) – 31:28	3–2
R. Ukita (N. Hattori, M. Tsukimoto) – 32:04	4–2
	4–3	57:57 – T. Horváth (K. Jókai Szilágyi)

4 min
Penalties
2 min
39
Shots
26

29 March; 15:00	Hungary	0 – 6 (0-1, 0-1, 0-4)	Japan	Icecenter Rink 1, Budapest; Attendance: 850

Game reference

Anikó Németh
Goalies
Ayu Tonosaki
Referee:
(Germany) Ramona Weiss
Linesmen:
(Finland) Jenni Heikkinen
(Sweden) Veronica Johansson

0–1	07:42 – H. Toko (C. Miyazaki)
0–2	36:46 – R. Ukita (C. Miyazaki, H. Toko)
0–3	50:09 – Y. Enomoto (S. Taka, F. Sasano (PP1)
0–4	55:51 – M. Tsukimoto (N. Hattori, H. Toko) (PP1)
0–5	58:57 – C. Miyazaki (H. Toko, R. Ukita)
0–6	59:46 – Y. Enomoto (H. Toko, Y. Kawashima)

8 min
Penalties
6 min
27
Shots
41

Hungary are relegated to the 2015 Division I.

=== Final round ===
Quarterfinals
B2	Russia	3
A3	Finland	1
A2	Czech Republic	3
B3	Sweden	0

Semifinals
A1	Canada	1
B2	Russia	0
B1	United States	3
A2	Czech Republic	1

Final
A1	Canada	5
B1	United States	1
Third place
B2	Russia	0
A2	Czech Republic	1

==== Quarterfinals ====
27 March 2014; 15:00	Russia	3 – 1 (0-1, 1-0, 2-0)	Finland	Icecenter Rink 1, Budapest; Attendance: 120

Game reference

Nadezhda Morozova
Goalies
Anni Keisala
Referee:
(Czech Republic) Drahomíra Fialová
Linesmen:
(United States) Kate Connolly
(Slovakia) Jana Habánová

	0–1	11:37 – E. Nuutinen (M. Nilsson) (PP1)
F. Kadirova (A. Rakhimova) – 36:04	1–1
A. Neryuyeva (A. Rakhimova, M. Batalova – 50:06	2–1
A. Shokhina (SH1; ENG) – 58:54	3–1

16 min
Penalties
8 min
35
Shots
35

27 March 2014; 17:30	Czech Republic	3 – 0 (2-0, 0-0, 1-0)	Sweden	Icecenter Rink 2, Budapest; Attendance: 129

Game reference

Klára Peslarová
Goalies
Sarah Berglind
Referee:
(United States) Katie Guay
Linesmen:
(Austria) Bettina Angerer
(Canada) Jennifer McMahon

K. Bukolská (T. Vanišová) – 15:08	1–0
A. Lédlová – 18:55	2–0
M. Mašková (ENG) – 58:50	3–0

0 min
Penalties
2 min
45
Shots
21

==== Semifinals ====
29 March 2014; 14:00	Canada	1 – 0 (0-0, 0-0, 0-0) (OT: 1-0)	Russia	Icecenter Rink 2, Budapest; Attendance: 150

Game reference
Shea Tiley	Goalies	Valeria Tarakanova	Referee: (Sweden) Gabrielle Gran; Linesmen: (United States) Kate Connolly (Denmark) Malene Skovbakke
L. Wildfang (R. Leslie, K. Heffernan) – 63:09 / 1–0			Referee: (Sweden) Gabrielle Gran; Linesmen: (United States) Kate Connolly (Denmark) Malene Skovbakke
2 min	Penalties	8 min	Referee: (Sweden) Gabrielle Gran; Linesmen: (United States) Kate Connolly (Denmark) Malene Skovbakke
70	Shots	24	Referee: (Sweden) Gabrielle Gran; Linesmen: (United States) Kate Connolly (Denmark) Malene Skovbakke

29 March 2014; 18:30	United States	3 – 1 (1-0, 0-1, 2-0)	Czech Republic	Icecenter Rink 1, Budapest; Attendance: 225

Game reference

Kaitlin Burt
Goalies
Klára Peslarová
Referee:
(Canada) Meghan Mallette
Linesmen:
(Austria) Bettina Angerer
(Slovakia) Jana Habánová

S. Baldwin (T. Williamson) (PP1) – 05:00	1–0
	1–1	37:59 – V. Přibylová (T. Vanišová)
R. Gilmore (T. Cianfarano, J. Dunne) (PP1) – 41:12	2–1
M. Kent (T. Cianfarano, G. Bizal) – 49:37	3–1

4 min
Penalties
8 min
61
Shots
9

==== Fifth place game ====
29 March 2014; 17:30	Sweden	2 – 3 (0-0, 1-1, 1-1) (OT: 0-1)	Finland	Icecenter Rink 2, Budapest; Attendance: 122

Game reference

Julia Åberg
Goalies
Kati Asikainen
Referee:
(Slovakia) Mária Zemiaková
Linesmen:
(Estonia) Kaire Leet
(Norway) Anna Nygård

H. Olsson – 20:39	1–0
	1–1	37:02 – E. Nuutinen (S. Säkkinen)
V. Samuelsson (S. Hjalmarsson) – 53:19	2–1
	2–2	53:59 – S. Hakala (L. Hakala, E. Rakkolainen)
	2–3	61:52 – M. Klemola (R. Lindholm, N. Salomäki)

12 min
Penalties
4 min
20
Shots
57

==== Bronze medal game ====
30 March 2014; 15:00	Russia	0 – 1 (0–0, 0–1, 0–0)	Czech Republic	Icecenter Rink 1, Budapest; Attendance: 200

Game reference
Valeria Tarakanova; Nadezhda Morozova	Goalies	Klára Peslarová	Referee: (United States) Katie Guay; Linesmen: (Austria) Bettina Angerer (Canada) Jennifer McMahon
0–1 / 38:46 – A. Tejralová (V. Přibylová, D. Lásková) (PP1)			Referee: (United States) Katie Guay; Linesmen: (Austria) Bettina Angerer (Canada) Jennifer McMahon
10 min	Penalties	8 min	Referee: (United States) Katie Guay; Linesmen: (Austria) Bettina Angerer (Canada) Jennifer McMahon
20	Shots	33	Referee: (United States) Katie Guay; Linesmen: (Austria) Bettina Angerer (Canada) Jennifer McMahon

==== Final ====
30 March 2014; 18:30	United States	1 – 5 (0–0, 0–3, 1–2)	Canada	Icecenter Rink 1, Budapest; Attendance: 940

Game reference

Erin O'Neil
Goalies
Shea Tiley
Referee:
(Czech Republic) Drahomíra Fialová
Linesmen:
(Sweden) Veronica Johansson
(Norway) Anna Nygård

	0–1	35:04 – S. Potomak (V. Bach) (PP1)
	0–2	36:12 – È-A. Picard (A. Labelle, S. Fieseler)
	0–3	38:34 – S. Cogan (K. Heffernan, H. Miller)
A. Laing (PP2) – 42:45	1–3
	1–4	55:23 – È-A. Picard (A. Labelle)
	1–5	57:51 – S. Potomak (ENG)

8 min
Penalties
14 min
27
Shots
31

=== Final rankings ===
Pos	Grp	Team	Pld	W	OTW	OTL	L	GF	GA	GD	Pts	Final result
1	A	Canada	5	4	1	0	0	25	2	+23	14	Champions
2	B	United States	5	4	0	0	1	24	7	+17	12	Runners-up
3	A	Czech Republic	6	3	1	0	2	12	12	0	11	Third place
4	B	Russia	6	3	0	1	2	12	11	+1	10	Fourth place
5	A	Finland	5	1	1	1	2	11	18	−7	6	Fifth place game
6	B	Sweden	5	1	0	1	3	8	19	−11	4	Fifth place game
7	A	Japan	5	2	0	0	3	14	17	−3	6	Win Relegation game
8	B	Hungary (H)	5	0	0	0	5	5	25	−20	0	Relegation to Division I A

Source: https://stats.iihf.com/Hydra/365/index.html
(H) Host

=== Statistics ===
==== Scoring leaders ====
Pos	Player	Country	GP	G	A	Pts	+/−	PIM
1	Sarah Potomak	Canada	5	5	4	9	+7	0
2	Taylar Cianfarano	United States	5	6	2	8	+8	0
3	Rui Ukita	Japan	5	5	2	7	+2	2
4	Victoria Bach	Canada	5	4	3	7	+7	0
5	Emma Nuutinen	Finland	5	3	4	7	–1	2
5	Lauren Wildfang	Canada	5	3	4	7	+7	4
7	Haruka Toko	Japan	5	1	6	7	+3	2
8	Ève-Audrey Picard	Canada	5	5	1	6	+8	4
9	Alexandria Laing	United States	5	3	3	6	+8	0
10	Chisato Miyazaki	Japan	5	2	4	6	+3	0

GP = Games played; G = Goals; A = Assists; Pts = Points; +/− = P Plus–minus; PIM = Penalties In Minutes

==== Goaltending leaders ====
(minimum 40% team's total ice time)

Pos	Player	Country	TOI	GA	GAA	Sv%	SO
1	Shea Tiley	Canada	183:09	1	0.33	98.63	2
2	Nadezhda Morozova	Russia	224:02	4	1.07	96.23	0
3	Klara Peslarova	Czech Republic	345:00	9	1.57	95.08	2
4	Sarah Berglind	Sweden	179:33	8	2.67	93.44	0
5	Ayu Tonosaki	Japan	199:11	9	2.71	93.23	1

TOI = Time on ice (minutes:seconds); GA = Goals against; GAA = Goals against average; Sv% = Save percentage; SO = Shutouts
Source: IIHF.com

==== Tournament awards ====
Best players selected by the directorate:

- Best Goaltender: (Czech Republic) Klára Peslarová
- Best Defenceman: (United States) Jincy Dunne
- Best Forward: (United States) Taylar Cianfarano

== Division I ==
=== Division I "A" ===
The Division I "A" tournament was played in Füssen, Germany, from 29 March to 4 April 2014.

Team	Pld	W	OTW	OTL	L	GF	GA	GD	Pts	Promotion or relegation
Switzerland	5	4	0	1	0	19	4	+15	13	Promoted to the 2015 Top Division
France	5	3	1	0	1	16	10	+6	11	
Germany	5	3	1	0	1	20	8	+12	11	
Norway	5	2	0	0	3	11	14	−3	6	
Slovakia	5	1	0	1	3	7	10	−3	4	
Great Britain	5	0	0	0	5	4	31	−27	0	Relegated to the 2015 Division I Qualification

Source: IIHF

=== Division I Qualification ===
The Division I Qualification tournament was played in Krynica-Zdrój, Poland, from 18 to 23 March 2014.

Team	Pld	W	OTW	OTL	L	GF	GA	GD	Pts	Promotion
Austria	4	4	0	0	0	21	3	+18	12	Promoted to the 2015 Division I "A"
Poland	4	2	1	0	1	13	8	+5	8	
China	4	1	1	0	2	11	15	−4	5	
Italy	4	0	1	1	2	5	12	−7	3	
Kazakhstan	4	0	0	2	2	5	17	−12	2	

Source: IIHF
