= Transgender people in ice hockey =

The participation of transgender people in ice hockey is an ongoing issue in the place of LGBT+ rights and diversity in ice hockey. Only a small handful of professional players have come out as openly trans, and systemic transphobia presents many barriers to the inclusion of trans people in the sport.

== History ==
In 2003, USA Hockey banned a transgender woman from participating in the Women's National Ice Hockey Tournament.

In January 2013, the NHL's Vancouver Canucks welcomed transgender teenager and Britannia Secondary School goaltender Cory Oskam onto the ice to stand next to Cory Schneider during the pre-game national anthem.

In 2013, Jesse Thompson, a junior hockey player in Ontario, made a complaint to the Human Rights Tribunal of Ontario concerning harassment and bullying over his being trans. In 2017, the Ontario Hockey Federation made transgender training mandatory for all minor hockey coaches as a result of the tribunal.

In 2014, the Whitehorse Women's Hockey League announced a policy allowing anyone who identifies as a woman or was assigned female at birth to participate in the league without restriction.

In October 2016, NWHL Buffalo Beauts player Harrison Browne became the first professional hockey player to publicly come out as transgender during their career. He postponed his medical transition until his retirement from the league in 2018.

In January 2018, CWHL Toronto Furies player Jessica Platt publicly came out as transgender, the first professional female hockey player to come out as a transgender woman. Ella Licari, who played in the Australian Women's Ice Hockey League from 2016 to 2019, also came out as transgender that year.

In April 2018, Leksands IF Dam goaltender Leon Reuterström publicly came out as a transgender man, and had to retire due to his testosterone therapy contravening SDHL anti-doping rules.

In the autumn of 2018, Fabienne Peter became the first openly transgender player to play in the Switzerland women's ice hockey league.

In April 2019, the San José Sharks honoured 15-year old Elliot Govaars of the San José Junior Sharks in a pre-game ceremony on Trans Day of Visibility.

In January 2020, the British EIHL held its first ever Pride Weekend.

In March 2025, Ice Hockey UK in collaboration with England Ice Hockey, Scottish Ice Hockey and the EIHL introduced policy fully restricting transgender women from participating in women's categories.

== Policies ==
=== IIHF ===
The 2021 International Ice Hockey Federation Transgender Policy came into effect on 1 June 2020. The policy bars transgender men from playing in women's competitions after beginning any form of hormone treatment, and specifies that transgender women wishing to compete in women's competitions must demonstrate that their serum testosterone concentration has been less than 5nmol/L1 continuously for a period of at least 12 months and continuously throughout their playing time. The policy does not require legal gender identity recognition or surgical changes.

=== Ice Hockey UK ===
Ice Hockey UK previously maintained a policy on transgender inclusion stating that clubs must "be conscious of the wide variety within the trans community, and be alert to the flexible approach needed so that they may be welcomed and included without discrimination, not only as players, but also as managers, coaches, staff members, and in the social life of the Club." However, this policy was updated in March 2025 to remove transgender women's ability to participate in the "adult female category", the policy now stating that "players are only permitted to play in the female category if the Sex that was originally recorded at birth was female".

=== USA Hockey ===
In January 2019, USA Hockey announced a new set of guidelines on transgender athlete eligibility. The policies included notice that many ice hockey programmes were not limited by gender, such as mixed leagues and children's leagues. The guidelines for eligibility for trans players in restricted leagues stated that transgender women aged 14 and up must have undergone at least a year of testosterone suppression therapy and that transgender men should not have begun testosterone hormone therapy. The policy also explicitly contained guidelines for non-binary players. The policy generally received positive feedback from players. However, there is ongoing discussion about the status of transgender women's ability to participate as of November 2025. The updated guideline under USA Hockey Participant Eligibility Policy states "athletes are only permitted to participate in such programs based on their sex assigned at birth".

=== PHF ===
The now-defunct Premier Hockey Federation policy on trans eligibility banned players assigned female at birth from playing while undergoing testosterone hormone therapy and specifies that players assigned male at birth must be able to demonstrate that their serum total testosterone level "is within typical limits of women athletes," and that the league may monitor hormone levels via testing. The policy was announced in December 2016, the first professional sports league to announce specific guidelines for trans eligibility, and was developed in collaboration with You Can Play and the National Center for Lesbian Rights.

== Organisations ==
=== Team Trans ===
In 2019, Team Trans was founded in Massachusetts, in the United States, as an all-transgender and nonbinary hockey team. It is believed to be the only all-transgender sports team currently active in the United States.

=== You Can Play ===
You Can Play is a social activism campaign dedicated to the eradication of homophobia and the inclusion of LGBT+ people in sports. It was founded after the death of openly-gay Miami University player Brendan Burke.

== List of notable transgender ice hockey players ==
- Harrison Browne
- Fabienne Peter
- Jessica Platt
- Leon Reuterström

== See also ==
- Homosexuality in ice hockey
- Transgender people in sports
- Transgender people in chess
- List of LGBT sportspeople
