= Transgender people in chess =

The participation of transgender people in chess refers to transgender individuals who compete in chess tournaments. As of 2025, it is a controversial part of a broader discussion regarding transgender people in sports, particularly trans women competing in women's sports. Only a handful of professional chess players have come out as openly trans.

== History ==
Transgender people have participated in chess across different historical periods. At this time, International Chess Federation (FIDE) and United States Chess Federation (USCF) have separate competitions for men and women. In modern organized chess their participation has also become the subject of federation policy, particularly around gender self-identification, women’s titles, and eligibility for women-only events.

During the 18th century, French spy, diplomat, soldier, and trans person Chevalière d'Éon was a chess enthusiast. D'Eon was listed as a subscriber to André Danican Philidor's new edition in June 1777. She also beat Philidor in a chess match where the latter was blindfolded.

In May 2018, the United States Chess Federation (USCF) Executive Board unanimously voted in favor of self-identification of transgender chess players. The policy reads:

The Executive Board moves to adopt the following transgender policy as provided by legal counsel: Allow a person to identify as they choose, and allow each person one change to their gender identification. If an individual attempts a second change to gender identification, at that time the individual must provide US Chess a birth certificate, and the birth gender indicated on the birth certificate will be used to determine gender for US Chess purposes.

In 2021, Yosha Iglesias began transitioning. She was an International Chess Federation (FIDE) Master and a chess coach at the time. The French Chess Federation didn't immediately recognize her gender change, deciding not to award her second place among women at the French Blitz championship. When asked about the decision, the organization's vice president Jean-Baptiste Mullon clarified, "Yosha has asked us to change her gender without justifying it with the gender on her ID. We have yet to work out how we are authorised to deal with her request. We have neither refused nor accepted it." She became the first openly-transgender Women International Master on April 29, 2024.

In 2022, Morgen Mills achieved the Woman FIDE Master (WFM) title. She became the first trans woman to internationally represent Canada in chess that year, playing in the country's women's team at the 44th Chess Olympiad in Chennai, India. While Mills did express some fears over how her participation might be received, the Chess Federation of Canada fully supported her placement on the team.

In August 2023, FIDE announced that transgender women would be banned from competing in any official FIDE women-only events. Additionally, FIDE also announced that transgender men who've obtained women's titles before transitioning would have those titles abolished. Adding to this, FIDE stated it could possibly reinstate such titles "if the person changes the gender back to a woman." One advocate in favor of the policy was Riley Gaines, who worked alongside leadership to ensure its implementation.

This policy sparked criticism from chess players. Yosha Iglesias said that the policy would lead to "unnecessary harm" to trans players and women. Jennifer Shahade, two-time United States Women's Champion, reacted by stating, "It's obvious they didn't consult with any transgender players in constructing it... I strongly urge FIDE to reverse course on this and start from scratch with better consultants." Labour MP Angela Eagle came out against the ban:

There is no physical advantage in chess unless you believe men are inherently more able to play than women – I spent my chess career being told women's brains were smaller than men's and we shouldn't even be playing.

The French Chess Federation expressed opposition to FIDE's policy, with its vice president stating, "We are not going to follow FIDE's decision." The organization's vice president also added "FIDE does not have the power to impose this decision on the national championships." The USCF also reiterated its stance. The English Chess Federation called the rule discriminatory and promised no change to their rules.

In June 2025, a trans girl won Germany's under-18 girls' chess championship, sparking controversy. The German Chess Federation has ruled out banning trans women, stating that "chess is diverse and inclusive."

== List of notable transgender chess players ==
- Yosha Iglesias (born 1987)
- Annemarie Sylvia Meier (born 1957)
- Summer Dylan Quercia (born 1985)
- Natalia Parés Vives (born 1955)
- Morgen Mills (born 1984)
- Chevalière d'Éon (1728–1810)
- Thalia Holmes (born 2004)

== See also ==
- Transgender people in sports
- Transgender people in ice hockey
- List of LGBT sportspeople
