= Kendall Hanley =

American ice hockey official

- Born: c. 1987 (age 38–39) Raleigh, North Carolina, U.S.
- Height: 5 ft 8 in (173 cm)
- Shot: Left
- Played for: Elmira Soaring Eagles; SUNY-Oswego Lakers
- Playing career: 2005–2009

Kendall Hanley (born c. 1987) is an American ice hockey official, currently serving as a linesman in the American Hockey League (AHL). She was the recipient of USA Hockey’s 2020–21 Ben Allison Award in recognition of her dedication on the ice and representation of USA Hockey in the finest manner, as voted by the 150 members of the USA Hockey Officiating Development Program. Hanley has officiated international tournaments hosted by the International Ice Hockey Federation (IIHF) and USA Hockey, and for the National Hockey League (NHL), the Premier Hockey Federation (PHF; previously NWHL), the National Collegiate Athletic Association (NCAA), the Western Collegiate Hockey Association (WCHA), and a number of other leagues in North America.

A former college ice hockey player, she played as a defenceman with the Elmira Soaring Eagles women's ice hockey program during 2005 to 2007, and as a forward with the SUNY-Oswego Lakers women's ice hockey program during 2007 to 2009.

== Officiating career ==
Hanley became interested in officiating following her 2009 graduation from the State University of New York at Oswego with a degree in zoology. She was searching for a way to remain actively involved in the ice hockey community while living in Dallas during an internship with the Dallas Zoo when she met a female official during a local pickup game and, as she described in 2019, “… just listened to her when she told me what [being a referee] was all about. I fell in love with it.”

By 2013, Hanley had advanced to officiating national and international tournaments hosted by USA Hockey, including the 2013 Four Nations Cup and the 2014 Tier II Girls National Tournament.

During September 7 through 10, 2019, Hanley became one of four women to officiate at the NHL level for the first time, working in an NHL Prospect Tournament hosted by the Detroit Red Wings in Traverse City, Michigan.

Hanley served as a linesman alongside Kirsten Welsh and referees Kelly Cooke and Katie Guay in the Elite Women's 3-on-3 event at the 2020 National Hockey League All-Star Game at Enterprise Center in St. Louis.

Also in 2020, Hanley served as a linesman at the 2020 IIHF Women's U18 World Championship, joining Cooke as the only American officials at the tournament, and officiated the bronze medal game, a 6–1 victory by Russia over Finland.

Hanley was one of ten women comprising the all-female officiating staff of the National Women's Hockey League (NWHL) for the 2021 NWHL season. In August 2021, she served as a linesman for the 2021 IIHF Women's World Championship, serving in the bronze medal game – a 3–1 victory for Finland over Switzerland.
