= Nadezhda Morozova =

Nadezhda Morozova may refer to:

- Nadezhda Morozova (ice hockey)
- Nadezhda Morozova (speed skater)
