= Valeria Tarakanova =

Russian ice hockey player

Valeria Tarakanova Валерия Тараканова
- Born: 20 June 1998 (age 28) Zavolzhye, Nizhny Novgorod Oblast, Russia
- Height: 1.83 m (6 ft 0 in)
- Weight: 83 kg (183 lb; 13 st 1 lb)
- Position: Goaltender
- Catches: Left
- ZhHL team Former teams: Torpedo Nizhny Novgorod; SKIF Nizhny Novgorod
- National team: Russia
- Playing career: 2014–present
Medal record
Universiade
Gold medal – first place	2017 Almaty	Ice hockey
Gold medal – first place	2019 Krasnoyarsk	Ice hockey

Valeria Dmitrievna Tarakanova (Russian: Валерия Дмитриевна Тараканова, romanized: Valeriya Dmitriyevna Tarakanova; born 20 June 1998) is a Russian ice hockey goaltender, currently playing in the Zhenskaya Hockey League (ZhHL) with Torpedo Nizhny Novgorod.

== Playing career ==
As a junior player with the Russian national under-18 team, Tarakanova participated in the IIHF Women's U18 World Championships in 2014, 2015, and 2016. At the 2015 tournament, she backstopped the Russian team to a bronze medal victory with a .919 save percentage and 2.74 goals against average while playing in all six games. In recognition of her outstanding play, she was selected as Best Goaltender by the tournament directorate, named to the media All-Star Team, and chosen as a top-three player on the Russian team by the coaches. At the 2016 tournament, she again served as the starting netminder, playing in all six games and registering a .901 save percentage and 2.91 goals against average, as Russia fell to Sweden in the bronze medal match. Despite narrowly missing the medal podium, Tarakanova was singled out as the tournament's MVP by the media and, in a repeat of the previous year, chosen as a top-3 player on the Russian team.

She represented Russia at the 2015 IIHF Women's World Championship and is a two-time Winter Universiade gold medalist, having participated in the Russian victories in the women's ice hockey tournament at the 2017 Winter Universiade and in the women's ice hockey tournament at the 2019 Winter Universiade. With the Olympic Athletes from Russia women's national ice hockey team, she participated in the women's ice hockey tournament at the 2018 Winter Olympics in Pyeongchang.

== Career statistics ==
=== International ===
Year	Team	Event	Result	GP	W	L	T/OT	MIN	GA	SO	GAA	SV%
2018	Russia	OG	4th	2	0	2	0	77:08	8	0	6.22	0.862
