= Kelly Cooke =

American ice hockey referee and player

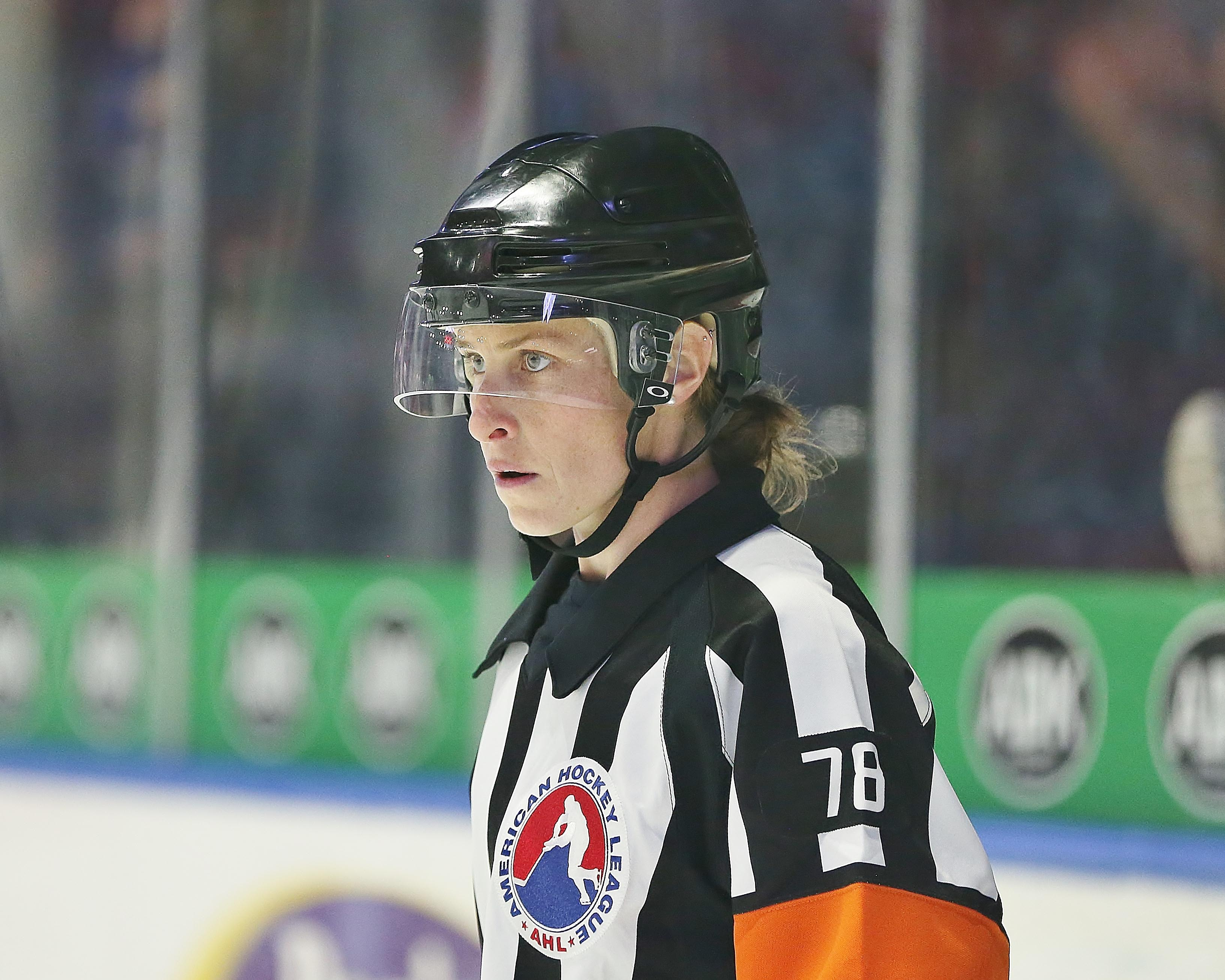
- Cooke in 2021
- Born: October 29, 1990 (age 35) Andover, Massachusetts, U.S.
- Height: 5 ft 1 in (155 cm)
- Weight: 119 lb (54 kg; 8 st 7 lb)
- Position: Forward
- Shot: Left
- Played for: Princeton Tigers; Boston Blades; Boston Pride
- Playing career: 2009–2016

Kelly Cooke (born October 29, 1990) is an American ice hockey official, currently serving as a referee in the Professional Women's Hockey League (PWHL). A retired ice hockey forward, she played with the Boston Blades of the Canadian Women's Hockey League (CWHL) during the 2013–14 and 2014–15 seasons, and with the Boston Pride of the Premier Hockey Federation (PHF; previously NWHL) during the 2015–16 season. Her college ice hockey career was spent with the Princeton Tigers in the ECAC Hockey conference of the NCAA Division 1.

== Playing career ==
After graduating from Princeton University in 2013, Cooke was selected by the Boston Blades with the 35th overall pick in the 2013 CWHL Draft. In 2015, Cooke signed with the Boston Pride of the newly-created National Women's Hockey League (NWHL) professional league. On December 31, 2015, she participated in the 2016 Outdoor Women's Classic, the first outdoor professional women's ice hockey game.

Following her retirement from the NWHL in 2016, Cooke served as the league's Director of Player Safety.

== Officiating career ==
In September 2019, Cooke became one of four women to officiate at the NHL level for the first time, working in an NHL Prospect Tournament hosted by the Nashville Predators in Nashville, Tennessee.

Cooke was also joined by Katie Guay, Kendall Hanley, and Kirsten Welsh as officials who worked the Elite Women's 3-on-3 event at the 2020 National Hockey League All-Star Game at Enterprise Center in St. Louis.

Also in 2020, Cooke served as a referee at the 2020 IIHF Women's U18 World Championship and officiated the bronze medal game, a 6–1 victory by Russia over Finland.

Cooke officiates at the Professional Women's Hockey League, which started in 2024.

In August 2025, Cooke was selected to officiate the women's ice hockey tournament at the 2026 Winter Olympics.

== Personal ==
Cooke graduated from the Northeastern University School of Law in 2019.
