= Micah Zandee-Hart =

Canadian ice hockey player (born 1997)

- Zandee-Hart with the New York Sirens in 2026
- Born: January 13, 1997 (age 29) Saanichton, British Columbia, Canada
- Height: 5 ft 8 in (173 cm)
- Weight: 152 lb (69 kg; 10 st 12 lb)
- Position: Defence
- Shoots: Left
- PWHL team: New York Sirens
- National team: Canada
- Playing career: 2022–present

Micah Arielle Zandee-Hart (born January 13, 1997) is a Canadian professional ice hockey defenceman and captain of the New York Sirens of the Professional Women's Hockey League (PWHL).

== Early life ==
Micah Zandee-Hart was born to Mick Hart and Patricia Zandee-Hart on January 13, 1997 in Saanichton, British Columbia. She grew up in Brentwood Bay, the youngest of four siblings and began skating at the age of four. She played on boys' teams in the Peninsula Minor Hockey Association until the age of 15, when she began attending hockey camps and playing for the Okanagan Hockey Academy U18 team, which is a part of the Junior Women's Hockey League. She competed twice for Canada and captained the 2014-2015 team in a silver medal finish in the IIHF U18 Women's World Championship.

== Playing career ==
=== College ===
During her freshman season in 2015–16 at Cornell University, Zandee-Hart ranked third in team scoring and first among defencemen with 18 points. Her first goal came on November 20, 2015, against Mercyhurst University, the first game of a five-game point streak. She recorded multiple points six separate times.

In her sophomore year, the 2016–17 season, she was named captain of the Big Red, the second sophomore in program history to be named captain. She recorded five goals and 16 points over 32 games, leading the team with five power play goals, 11 power play points, and 56 blocked shots. She was a finalist for ECAC Defenseman of the Year.

Zandee-Hart would not play for Cornell in the 2017–18 season, instead centralizing with the Canadian national team.

As a junior in 2018–19, she recorded four goals and 21 points in 32 games, including a game-winning goal, her first at the NCAA level, in the March 9, 2019 ECAC semifinal against Princeton University.

In her final year of college hockey, the 2019–20 season, Zandee-Hart recorded seven goals and 32 points in 31 games, including a career-high four points against Mercyhurst on January 4, 2020. Her 1.03 points per game ranked fourth nationally amond defenders. She once again led the team in blocked shots with 58, finishing her collegiate career with 225, the most in Cornell history.

=== Professional ===
Zandee-Hart with the Sirens in 2026

Zandee-Hart joined the Professional Women's Hockey Players Association and their boycott of professional women's hockey in the 2020–21 season, playing in Calgary.

On September 8, 2023, New York of the newly-created Professional Women's Hockey League (PWHL) announced that they had signed Zandee-Hart, along with American forwards Abby Roque and Alex Carpenter, to three-year contracts as part of the league's pre-draft free agency period. On December 21, 2023, she was named the first-ever captain of the team. She was also chosen as the team's player representative for the PWHL Players Association (PWHLPA), the league's labour union.

On November 5, 2025, she signed a one-year contract with the Sirens through the 2026–27 season.

== International play ==
Medal record

Women's ice hockey

Representing Canada

Olympic Games
Gold medal – first place	2022 Beijing	Team

World Championships
Gold medal – first place	2022 Denmark	
Silver medal – second place	2023 Canada	
Silver medal – second place	2025 Czechia	
Bronze medal – third place	2019 Finland	

World U18 Championships
Gold medal – first place	2014 Hungary	
Silver medal – second place	2015 United States	

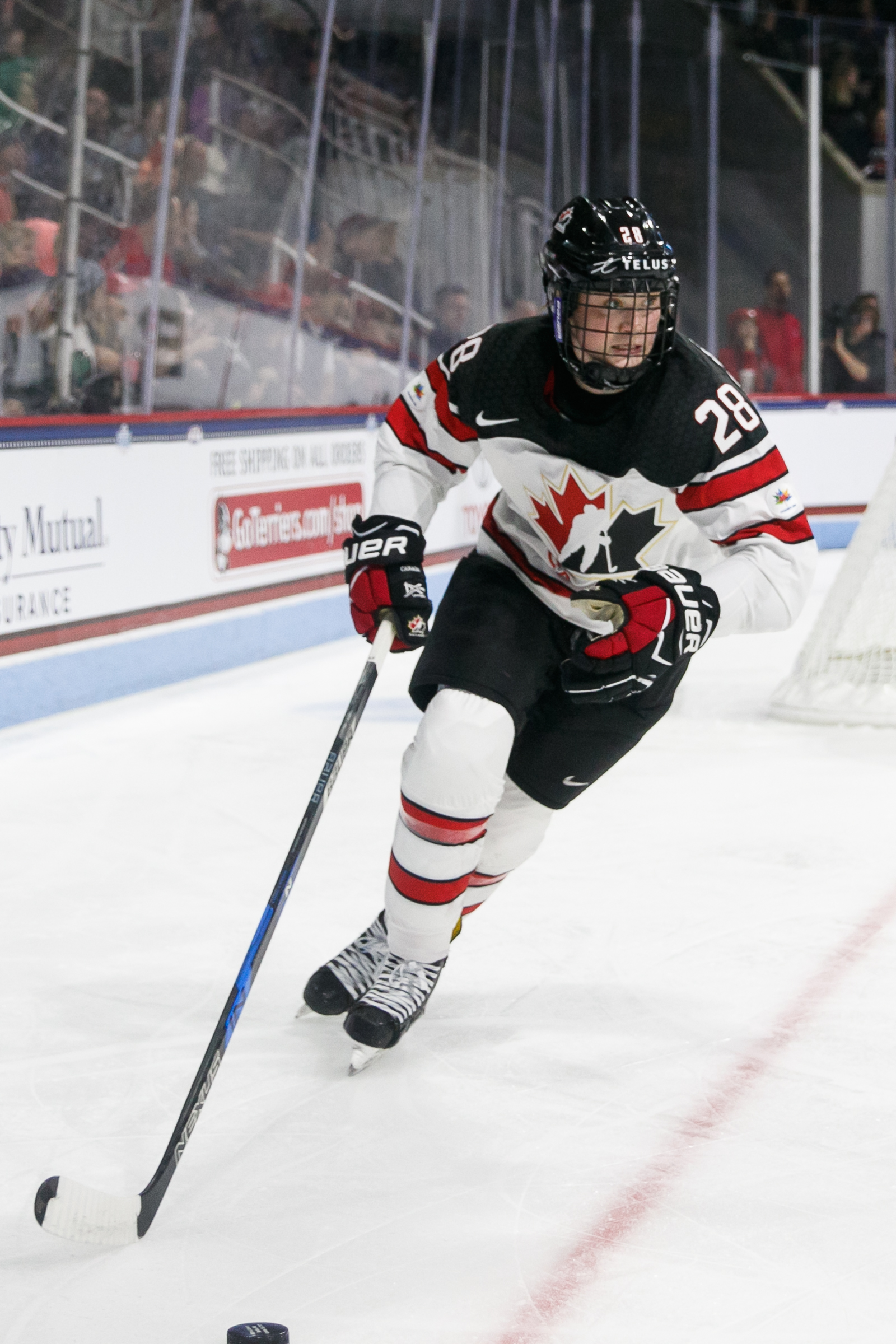
Zandee-Hart with Team Canada in 2017

Along with fellow British Columbia resident Sarah Potomak, Zandee-Hart was invited to participate in the International Ice Hockey Federation’s (IIHF) 2013 Women's High Performance Camp in Sheffield, England. While participating with Team British Columbia at the 2015 Canada Winter Games, Zandee-Hart was named the province's flag bearer at the event.

Hart played in two under-18 events with Team Canada winning gold in 2014 and, as team captain, silver in 2015.

With Canada's Under-22/Development Team, Zandee-Hart captured a gold medal at the 2016 Nations Cup. Before the event, the team participated in a series of exhibition games against the national teams of Austria, the Czech Republic and Hungary. She registered an assist in the December 30, 2015, game against Austria.

On November 23, 2016, she was named to the Canada women's national ice hockey team roster that competed against the United States in a pair of contests on December 13 (in Plymouth, Michigan) and December 20, 2016 (in Sarnia, Ontario). She is one of three members of the Canadian roster who made their debuts with the national team in the series against the United States.

On January 11, 2022, Zandee-Hart was named to Canada's 2022 Olympic team, becoming the first British Columbia-born woman to represent the country in Olympic ice hockey. At the games, she recorded four assists en route to a gold medal.

== Personal life ==
Zandee-Hart is part of the LGBTQ+ community. She attended Penticton Secondary School.

== Career statistics ==
=== Regular season and playoffs ===
			Regular season					Playoffs
Season	Team	League	GP	G	A	Pts	PIM	GP	G	A	Pts	PIM
2012–13	Okanagan Hockey Academy	JWHL	29	1	7	8	22	—	—	—	—	—
2013–14	Okanagan Hockey Academy	JWHL	29	1	6	7	30	—	—	—	—	—
2014–15	Okanagan Hockey Academy	JWHL	24	1	8	9	35	—	—	—	—	—
2015–16	Cornell University	ECAC	30	1	17	18	20	—	—	—	—	—
2016–17	Cornell University	ECAC	31	5	11	16	30	—	—	—	—	—
2017–18	Canada	AMHL (Men's)	12	0	4	4	4	—	—	—	—	—
2018–19	Cornell University	ECAC	32	4	17	21	30	—	—	—	—	—
2019–20	Cornell University	ECAC	31	7	25	32	20	—	—	—	—	—
2022–23	Team Sonnet	PWHPA	20	0	3	3	12	—	—	—	—	—
2023–24	PWHL New York	PWHL	19	0	3	3	10	—	—	—	—	—
2024–25	New York Sirens	PWHL	30	1	9	10	16	—	—	—	—	—
2025–26	New York Sirens	PWHL	29	1	3	4	50	—	—	—	—	—
PWHL totals			78	2	15	17	76	—	—	—	—	—

=== International ===
Year	Team	Event	Result	GP	G	A	Pts	PIM
2014	Canada	U18	1st place, gold medalist(s)	5	0	0	0	2
2015	Canada	U18	2nd place, silver medalist(s)	5	1	1	2	0
2019	Canada	WC	3rd place, bronze medalist(s)	7	0	2	2	2
2022	Canada	OG	1st place, gold medalist(s)	7	0	4	4	8
2022	Canada	WC	1st place, gold medalist(s)	7	0	1	1	0
2023	Canada	WC	2nd place, silver medalist(s)	7	0	1	1	2
2025	Canada	WC	2nd place, silver medalist(s)	3	1	1	2	0
Junior totals				10	1	1	2	2
Senior totals				31	1	9	10	12

== Awards and honours ==
Award	Year	Ref
International
World U18 Championship – Media All-Star Team	2015	
College
ECAC All-Rookie Team	2016	
All-Ivy Honorable Mention	2016	
ECAC All-Tournament Team	2017, 2019, 2020	
Second Team All-Ivy	2017, 2020	
First Team All-ECAC	2017	
Third Team All-ECAC	2019	
Third Team All-USCHO	2019, 2020	
Second Team All-ECAC	2020	
First Team All-Ivy	2020	

Sporting positions
Preceded by Position created	New York Sirens captain 2023–present	Incumbent
