= Thalia Holmes =

English chess player (born 2004)

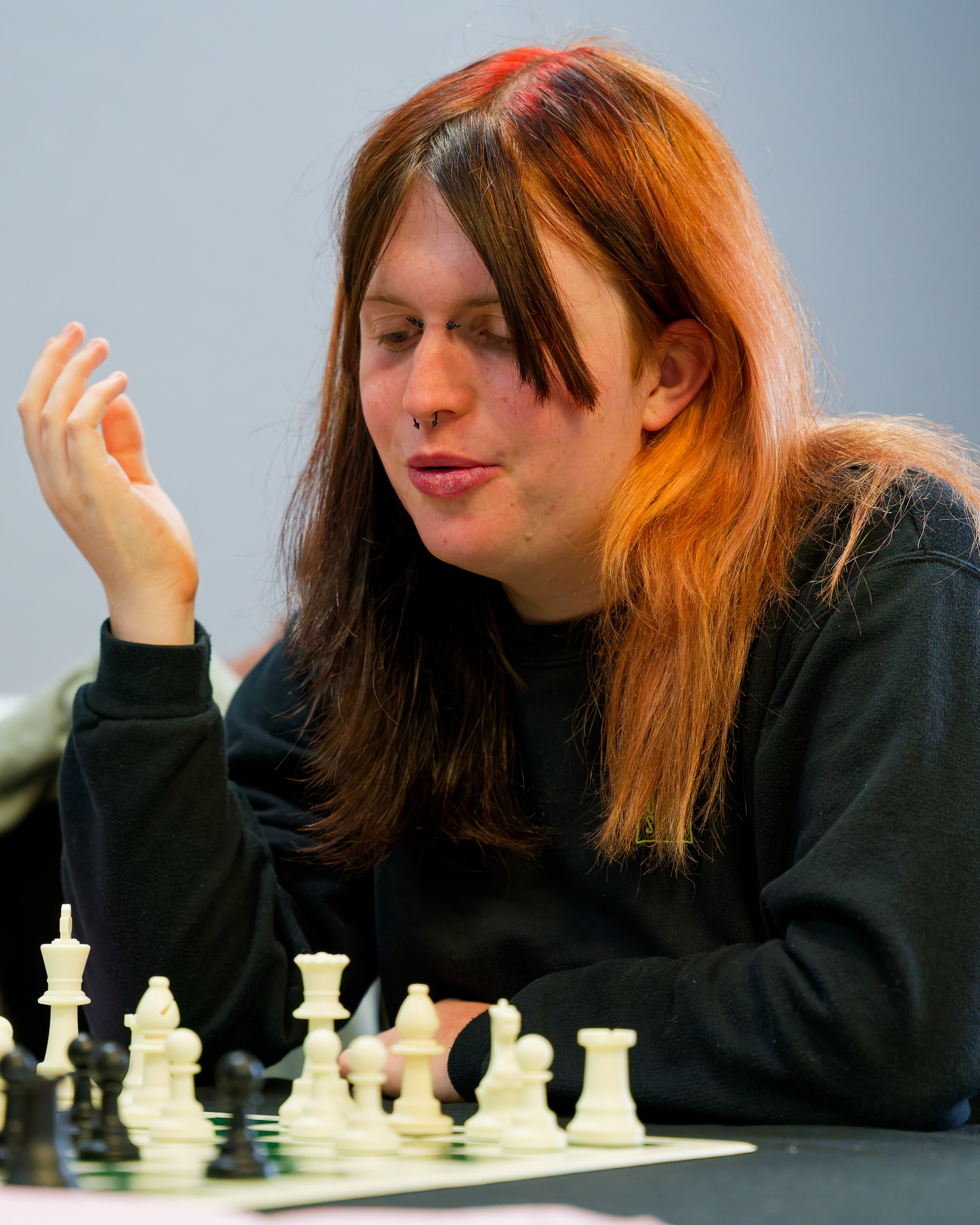
- Holmes in 2025

Personal information
- Born: 2004 (age 21–22)

Chess career
- Country: England
- Peak rating: 1719 (September 2025)

Thalia Holmes (born 2004) is an English chess player. She won the inaugural series of the BBC Two competition Chess Masters: The Endgame in 2025.

== Biography ==
Chess Masters: The Endgame
Final Game
Richie Kelly vs. Thalia Holmes

Position: g1 white king, f1 white rook, h2 white pawn, g2 white bishop, c2 white queen, b2 white pawn, g3 white pawn, e3 white pawn, a3 white pawn, d4 white pawn, c4 black pawn, a4 black pawn, g5 black bishop, e5 white knight, d5 black pawn, a5 black queen, h6 black pawn, e6 black pawn, a6 black rook, g7 black pawn, b7 black pawn, g8 black king

In this position, Kelly played Qf2. A better move would have been Qg6.

Holmes played chess from a young age and first represented England aged ten. Holmes attended Haberdashers’ Adams School in Newport and was a member of the Newport Chess Club. She studies history at university.

In 2022, Holmes was the winner of the under-18s Shropshire Megafinal of the UK Chess Challenge. She admires Latvian chess grandmaster Mikhail Tal.

In 2025, Holmes participated in the inaugural series of the BBC Two competition Chess Masters: The Endgame. Her nickname on the show was "The Tactician," due to her aggressive and tactical style of play. She won the show, beating "The Strategist" Richie Kelly in the final game.

Holmes is a transgender woman and has said that she participated in the show to improve the representation of trans people in chess.
