= Kateřina Bukolská =

Czech ice hockey player (born 1997)

- Born: 6 March 1997 (age 28); Prague, Czech Republic
- Height: 168 cm (5 ft 6 in)
- Position: Forward
- Shot: Left
- Played for: HC Berounské Lvice; HC Slavia Praha; HC Příbram; Leksands IF
- National team: Czech Republic
- Playing career: 2013–2022

Kateřina Bukolská (born 6 March 1997) is a Czech ice hockey player and member of the Czech national ice hockey team, who most recently played for Leksands IF of the Swedish Women's Hockey League (SDHL).

Bukolská represented the Czech Republic at the IIHF Women's World Championship Top Division tournaments in 2016, 2017, and 2021, and at the Division I Group A tournament in 2015. As a junior player with the Czech national under-18 team, she participated in the IIHF Women's U18 World Championships in 2013, 2014, and 2015, serving as an alternate captain in 2013 and 2015.
