= Leon Reuterström =

Swedish ice hockey goaltender

- Born: 30 November 1996 (age 28); Uppsala, Sweden
- Height: 1.72 m (5 ft 8 in)
- Weight: 63 kg (139 lb; 9 st 13 lb)
- Position: Goaltender
- Caught: Left
- Played for: Leksands IF; Almtuna IS
- Playing career: 2011–2018

Leon Reuterström (born 30 November 1996) is a Swedish former ice hockey goaltender and advocate for transgender inclusion in sports. From 2012 to 2018, he played for Leksands IF Dam in the Swedish Women's Hockey League (SDHL; previously called Riksserien), the top flight of Swedish women's hockey, before coming out to the public as a transgender man and retiring to pursue his medical transition.

== Playing career ==
Reuterström began his career with Almtuna IS of the Division I (renamed Damettan in 2015) and women's ice hockey AllEttan (Swedish: AllEttan i ishockey för damer). In 2012, he signed with Leksands IF, splitting the 2012–13 season between the team's top Riksserien side and the B-side playing in Damettan. He established himself fully as a top-side goaltender the next season, and would take over as Leksands' starting goalie in 2015.

In 2018, he publicly came out as a transgender man and announced his retirement from the SDHL in order to pursue his medical transition, as testosterone hormone replacement therapy conflicts with anti-doping rules in the sport.

Since his retirement, he has been outspoken about the difficulties trans people face in sports. In 2020, he returned to the ice for the first time in two years to participate in a charity match.

=== International ===
Rueterström represented Sweden at the 2014 IIHF World Women's U18 Championship, playing one game and posting a .941 save percentage.
