= Yosha Iglesias =

French chess player (born 1987)

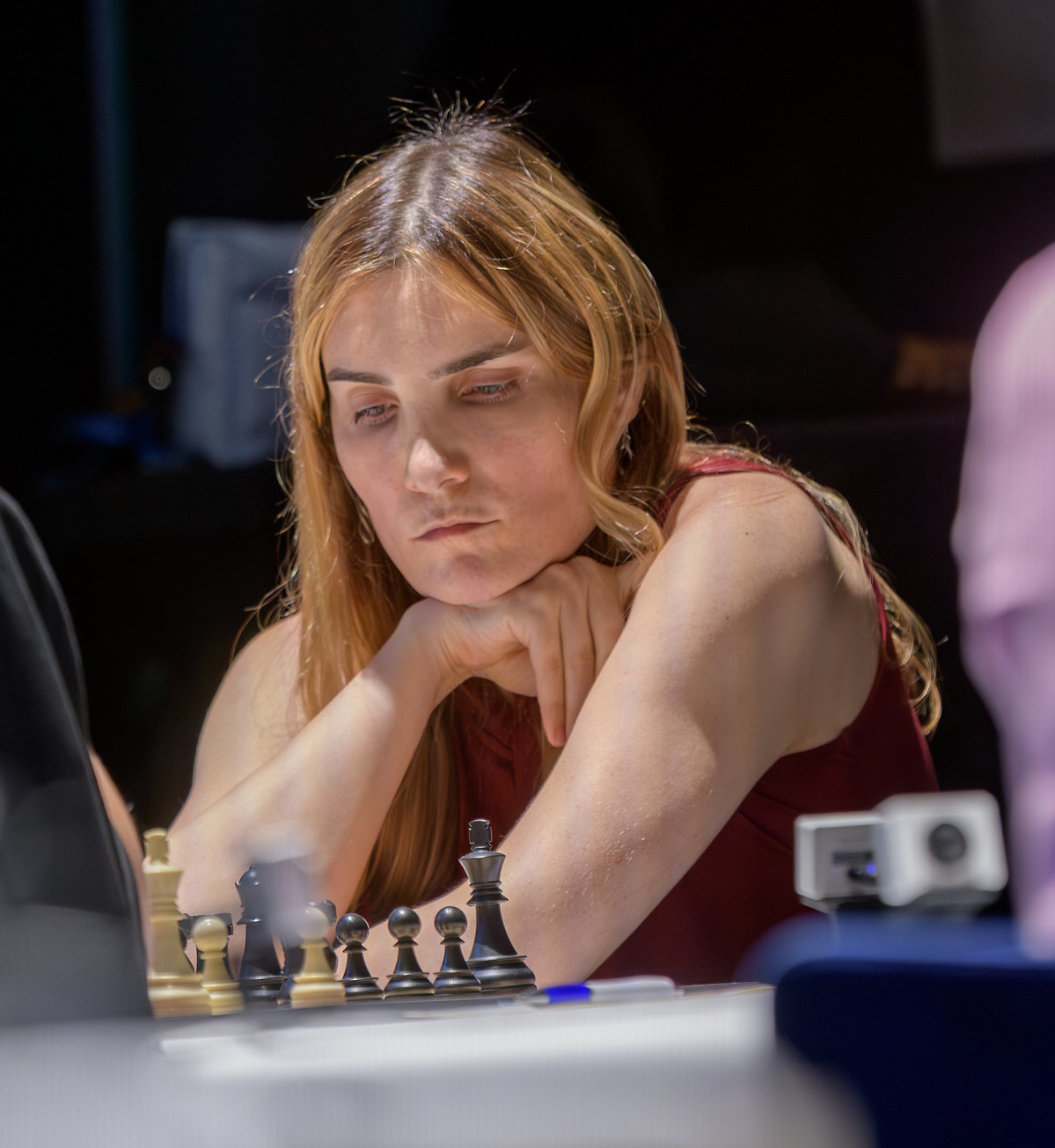

Personal information
- Born: 22 December 1987 (age 38) Paris, France

Chess career
- Country: France
- Title: FIDE Master (2019); Woman International Master (2024)
- Peak rating: 2336 (September 2025)

Yosha Iglesias (born 22 December 1987) is a French chess player. She is one of only a few openly transgender professional chess players.

== Biography ==
Iglesias was born on 22 December 1987 in France. She began attending chess club at the age of 9. In addition to being a chess player, she is a chess coach, composer, YouTuber, and poker player. She works for chess24. Iglesias has trained with Annemarie Sylvia Meier. She considered transitioning when she was around 20, and eventually did so around 2020.

In a June 2022 interview with Jennifer Shahade, Iglesias advocated for trans-inclusive policies within chess organizations, stating: "If men and women have equal abilities for the game of chess, the so-called 'female category' is justified by the numerous additional difficulties and discriminations that the players underdog (sic) because of their gender. And believe me, trans players are no more spared than other players."

In September 2022, Iglesias released a report during the Carlsen–Niemann controversy. Using the Chessbase analysis tool, she found that Hans Niemann played with 100% accuracy in ten of his over-the-board games in the last three years, and highlighted this as being incriminating evidence of him cheating. Chessbase later released an article clarifying that the tool was misused in the analysis, citing Iglesias's video as an example of "statistics at first sight".

In 2023, Iglesias was among 14 women who signed an open letter denouncing sexism and sexist violence in the French chess world.

In August 2023, Iglesias criticized FIDE's decision to disallow transgender people from participating in women's events, describing the regulations as "unfair, exclusive, and discriminatory". Along with several other national chess federations, the French Chess Federation (FFE) refused to implement the ban, and allowed Iglesias to participate in the French Women's Chess Championship. Despite these regulations, she fulfilled the requirements for the Woman International Master title later in December, becoming the first openly transgender person to qualify for the title.

On 29 April 2024, she announced that she had formally received the title of Woman International Master.

In August 2025, Iglesias became the French National Women's Champion after defeating the 2023 Champion Mitra Hejazipour in the final.
