= 2015 IIHF U18 Women's World Championship =

Tournament details
- Host country: United States
- Venue: HarborCenter (in 1 host city)
- Dates: 5–12 January 2015
- Teams: 8

Final positions
- Champions: United States (4th title)
- Runners-up: Canada
- Third place: Russia
- Fourth place: Czech Republic

Tournament statistics
- Games played: 21
- Goals scored: 101 (4.81 per game)
- Attendance: 13,788 (657 per game)
- Scoring leader: (Canada) Sarah Potomak (9 points)

Awards
- MVP: (Canada) Sarah Potomak

The 2015 IIHF U18 Women's World Championship was the eighth IIHF U18 Women's World Championship. The top division tournament was played in Buffalo, United States, from 5 to 12 January 2015. Twenty nations played in three levels, with promotion and relegation for the top and bottom teams at each level.

The United States won their fourth title, after defeating Canada in overtime in the gold medal game, with Jincy Roese scoring on the power play. This was the eighth consecutive final between the two nations, evening their all-time records. The bronze medal game was also a rematch from the previous year, this time the Russians defeated the Czechs earning their first ever medal at this level.

== Format ==
The preliminary round is divided into two pools that placed the top four seeds into Group A, and the bottom four in Group B. The top two finishers in Group A advances directly to the semifinals, while the two remaining teams and the top two in Group B will play a quarterfinal round. The bottom two teams from Group B will play a relegation series to determine the one team that gets relegated.

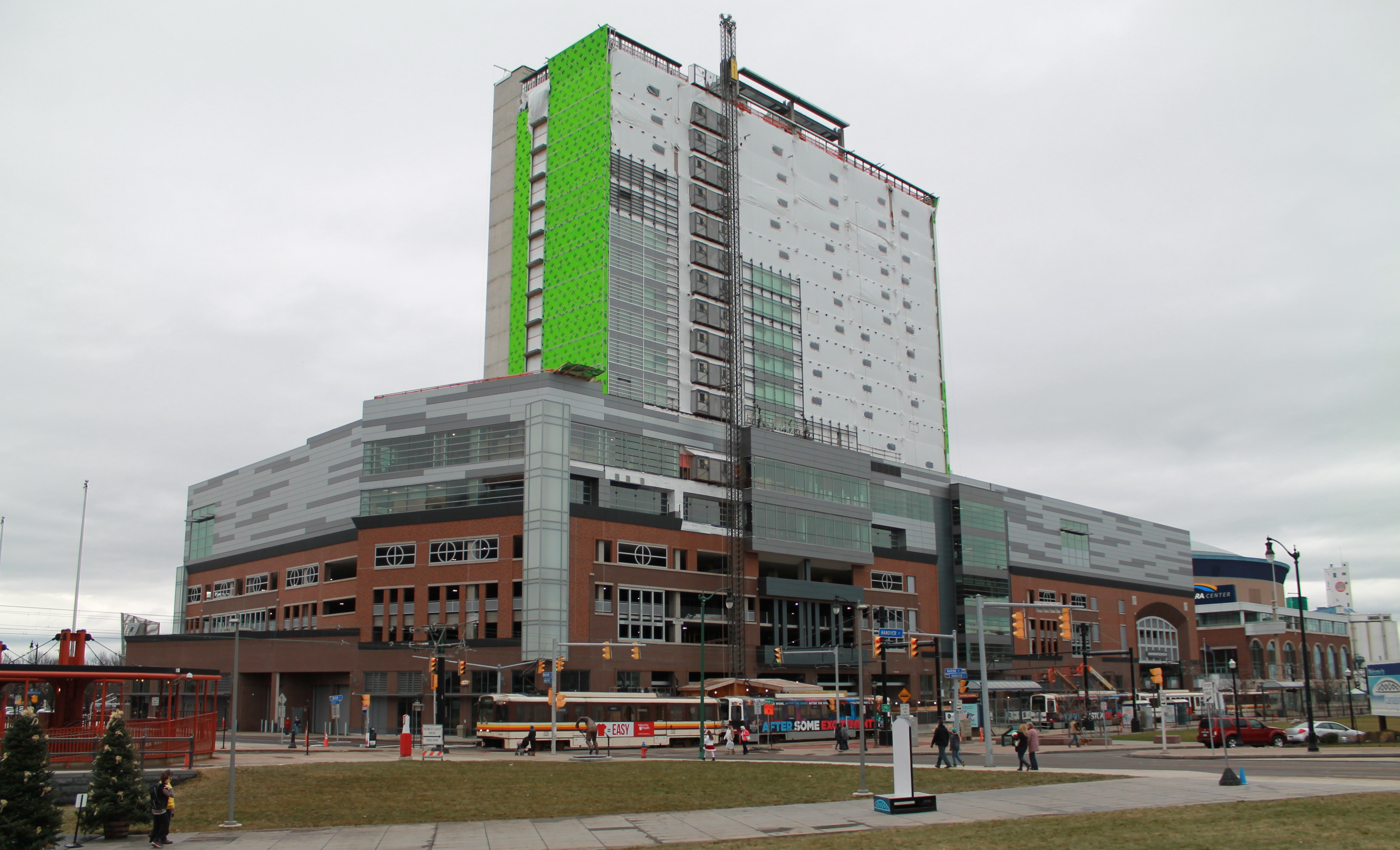
HarborCenter the venue for the tournament

== Preliminary round ==
All times are local (UTC–5).

=== Group A ===
Pos	Team	Pld	W	OTW	OTL	L	GF	GA	GD	Pts	Qualification
1	United States (H)	3	2	1	0	0	12	2	+10	8	Advance to semifinals
2	Canada	3	2	0	1	0	11	5	+6	7	Advance to semifinals
3	Russia	3	1	0	0	2	6	11	−5	3	Advance to quarterfinals
4	Czech Republic	3	0	0	0	3	2	13	−11	0	Advance to quarterfinals

Source: IIHF
(H) Host

5 January 2015; 15:30	Russia	3–1 (2–0, 1–0, 0–1)	Czech Republic	HarborCenter Rink 1

Game reference

5 January 2015; 19:00	Canada	1–2 GWS (0–1, 0–0, 1–0) (OT 0–0) (SO: 0–2)	United States	HarborCenter Rink 1

Game reference

6 January 2015; 15:30	Canada	3–2 (2–0, 1–1, 0–1)	Russia	HarborCenter Rink 1 Attendance: 522

Game reference

Kristen Campbell
Goalies
Valeria Tarakanova
Referee:
(Germany) Ramona Weiss
Linesmen:
(United States) Jacqueline Spresser
(Finland) Johanna Tauriainen

Giguère (Gebhard, Sucharda) – 1:42	1–0
Potomak (Labbe, O'Neill) – 10:06	2–0
	2–1	38:25 – Kadirova (Teryoshkina, Korotkikh)
Giguère (Gebhard, Potomak) – 39:18	3–1
	3–2	57:56 – Pirogova (Kadirova, Ganeyeva (PP)

12 min
Penalties
8 min
39
Shots
13

6 January 2015; 19:00	United States	3–0 (1–0, 0–0, 2–0)	Czech Republic	HarborCenter Rink 1

Game reference

8 January 2015; 15:30	Czech Republic	1–7 (1–1, 0–4, 0–2)	Canada	HarborCenter Rink 1

Game reference

8 January 2015; 19:00	United States	7–1 (2–0, 3–1, 2–0)	Russia	HarborCenter Rink 1

Game reference

=== Group B ===
Pos	Team	Pld	W	OTW	OTL	L	GF	GA	GD	Pts	Qualification
1	Sweden	3	2	0	0	1	8	5	+3	6	Advance to quarterfinals
2	Finland	3	2	0	0	1	7	5	+2	6	Advance to quarterfinals
3	Switzerland	3	2	0	0	1	5	5	0	6	Advance to relegation round
4	Japan	3	0	0	0	3	5	10	−5	0	Advance to relegation round

Source: IIHF

5 January 2015; 12:00	Sweden	3–2 (1–0, 0–1, 2–1)	Japan	HarborCenter Rink 1

Game reference

5 January 2015; 16:00	Finland	0–2 (0–0, 0–2, 0–0)	Switzerland	HarborCenter Rink 2

Game reference

6 January 2015; 12:00	Sweden	4–0 (3–0, 0–0, 1–0)	Switzerland	HarborCenter Rink 1

Game reference

6 January 2015; 16:00	Japan	2–4 (2–0, 0–2, 0–2)	Finland	HarborCenter Rink 2

Game reference

8 January 2015; 12:00	Japan	1–3 (0–0, 0–1, 1–2)	Switzerland	HarborCenter Rink 1

Game reference

8 January 2015; 16:00	Finland	3–1 (0–1, 3–0, 0–0)	Sweden	HarborCenter Rink 2

Game reference

== Relegation series ==
The third and fourth placed team from Group B played a best-of-three series to determine the relegated team.

9 January 2015; 12:00	Switzerland	2–1 (1–1, 1–0, 0–0)	Japan	HarborCenter Rink 1

Game reference

11 January 2015; 12:00	Japan	2–3 GWS (0–1, 2–1, 0–0) (OT 0–0) (SO: 0–1)	Switzerland	HarborCenter Rink 2

Game reference

== Final round ==
Quarterfinals
A4	Czech Republic	4
B1	Sweden	3
A3	Russia	4
B2	Finland	3

Semifinals
A1	United States	5
A4	Czech Republic	0
A2	Canada	3
A3	Russia	1

Final
A1	United States	3^{OT}
A2	Canada	2
Third place
A4	Czech Republic	1
A3	Russia	5

=== Quarterfinals ===
9 January 2015; 15:30	Russia	4–3 (0–3, 1–0, 3–0)	Finland	HarborCenter Rink 1

Game reference

9 January 2015; 19:00	Czech Republic	4–3 (1–0, 2–1, 1–2)	Sweden	HarborCenter Rink 1

Game reference

=== Semifinals ===
11 January 2015; 15:00	Canada	3–1 (1–1, 1–0, 1–0)	Russia	HarborCenter Rink 1

Game reference

11 January 2015; 19:00	United States	5–0 (2–0, 2–0, 1–0)	Czech Republic	HarborCenter Rink 1

Game reference

=== Fifth place game ===
11 January 2015; 15:30	Sweden	0–3 (0–2, 0–0, 0–1)	Finland	HarborCenter Rink 2

Game reference

=== Bronze medal game ===
12 January 2015; 15:00	Russia	5–1 (1–0, 2–1, 2–0)	Czech Republic	HarborCenter Rink 1 Attendance: 515

Game reference

Valeria Tarakanova
Goalies
Blanka Škodová
Referee:
(United States) Jerilyn Glenn
Linesmen:
(United States) Jacqueline Spresser
(Canada) Vanessa Stratton

Shtaryova (Shokhina, Kadirova) – 00:40	1–0
Kadirova (Shtaryova, Shokhina) – 22:27	2–0
	2–1	22:50 – Bukolská (Neubauerová)
Likhachyova (Falyakhova) – 30:18	3–1
Korotkikh – 41:52	4–1
Shokhina (Pirogova) – 50:18	5–1

6 min
Penalties
4 min
34
Shots
24

=== Gold medal game ===
12 January 2015; 19:00	United States	3–2 OT (1–1, 1–1, 0–0) (OT: 1–0)	Canada	HarborCenter Rink 1 Attendance: 1,800

Game reference

Kaitlin Burt
Goalies
Marlène Boissonnault
Referee:
(Germany) Ramona Weiss
Linesmen:
(Slovenia) Nataša Pagon
(Finland) Johanna Tauriainen

	0–1	03:14 – Labbe (Giguère, McGill)
Dunne – 19:27	1–1
Gorecki (Norby, Woken) – 25:00	2–1
	2–2	28:23 – Cogan (Agnew, Gebhard)
Dunne (Gilmore) (PP) – 60:51	3–2

6 min
Penalties
16 min
41
Shots
18

=== Final rankings ===
Pos	Grp	Team	Pld	W	OTW	OTL	L	GF	GA	GD	Pts	Final result
1	A	United States (H)	5	3	2	0	0	20	4	+16	13	Champions
2	A	Canada	5	3	0	2	0	16	9	+7	11	Runners-up
3	A	Russia	6	3	0	0	3	16	18	−2	9	Third place
4	A	Czech Republic	6	1	0	0	5	7	26	−19	3	Fourth place
5	B	Finland	5	3	0	0	2	13	9	+4	9	Fifth place game
6	B	Sweden	5	2	0	0	3	11	12	−1	6	Fifth place game
7	B	Switzerland	5	3	1	0	1	10	8	+2	11	Win Relegation game
8	B	Japan	5	0	0	1	4	8	15	−7	1	Relegation to Division I A

Source: https://stats.iihf.com/Hydra/492/
(H) Host

== Tournament awards ==
=== Best players selected by the directorate ===
Best Goalkeeper	(Russia) Valeria Tarakanova
Best Defenseman	(United States) Jincy Roese
Best Forward	(Canada) Sarah Potomak

=== Media All Stars ===
Goalkeeper	(Russia) Valeria Tarakanova
Defenceman	(United States) Jincy Roese
Defenceman	(Canada) Micah Hart
Forward	(Russia) Fanuza Kadirova
Forward	(Canada) Sarah Potomak
Forward	(United States) Melissa Samoskevich
Most Valuable Player	(Canada) Sarah Potomak

== Statistics ==
=== Scoring leaders ===
Pos	Player	Country	GP	G	A	Pts	+/−	PIM
1	Sarah Potomak	Canada	5	5	4	9	+8	4
2	Rebecca Gilmore	United States	5	2	7	9	+4	6
3	Melissa Samoskevich	United States	5	6	2	8	+6	6
4	Fanuza Kadirova	Russia	6	5	3	8	+5	0
5	Jincy Roese	United States	5	3	5	8	+4	0
6	Élizabeth Giguère	Canada	5	3	4	7	+7	6
6	Anna Shokhina	Russia	5	3	4	7	+7	0
8	Anniina Kaitala	Finland	5	2	4	6	+3	0
9	Sanni Hakala	Finland	5	5	0	5	+1	4
9	Alina Müller	Switzerland	5	5	0	5	–	4

GP = Games played; G = Goals; A = Assists; Pts = Points; +/− = P Plus–minus; PIM = Penalties In Minutes
Source: IIHF.com

=== Goaltending leaders ===
(minimum 40% team's total ice time)

Pos	Player	Country	TOI	GA	GAA	Sv%	SO
1	Andrea Brändli	Switzerland	310:00	8	1.55	94.94	1
2	Anni Keisala	Finland	240:00	5	1.25	94.74	1
3	Kaitlin Burt	United States	225:51	4	1.06	92.31	0
4	Marlène Boissonnault	Canada	245:51	7	1.71	91.95	0
5	Valeria Tarakanova	Russia	328:02	15	2.74	91.85	0

TOI = Time on ice (minutes:seconds); GA = Goals against; GAA = Goals against average; Sv% = Save percentage; SO = Shutouts
Source: IIHF.com

== Division I ==
=== Division I 'A' ===
The Division I 'A' tournament was played in Vaujany, France, from 4 to 10 January 2015.

In Division I play the French earned their first ever promotion to the top level. They opened the tournament with a shootout win over Norway and won the rest of their games earning a trip to St. Catherines for 2016.

Team	Pld	W	OTW	OTL	L	GF	GA	GD	Pts	Promotion or relegation
France	5	4	1	0	0	21	9	+12	14	Promoted to the 2016 Top Division
Norway	5	3	1	1	0	14	9	+5	12	
Slovakia	5	2	0	1	2	18	24	−6	7	
Germany	5	2	0	0	3	20	15	+5	6	
Hungary	5	2	0	0	3	10	13	−3	6	
Austria	5	0	0	0	5	6	19	−13	0	Relegated to the 2016 Division I Qualification

Source: IIHF

=== Division I Qualification ===
The Division I Qualification tournament was played in Katowice, Poland, from 19 to 25 January 2015. Denmark won all five games in their debut, earning promotion to the Division I 'A' tournament for 2016.

Team	Pld	W	OTW	OTL	L	GF	GA	GD	Pts	Promotion
Denmark	5	5	0	0	0	29	2	+27	15	Promoted to the 2016 Division I
Italy	5	4	0	0	1	11	8	+3	12	
Poland	5	3	0	0	2	21	12	+9	9	
Kazakhstan	5	1	1	0	3	6	14	−8	5	
China	5	1	0	1	3	3	19	−16	4	
Great Britain	5	0	0	0	5	3	18	−15	0	

Source: IIHF
