= Tallulah Roberts =

Jersey chess player, commentator and content creator

- Tallulah Roberts during the Sofia Cup 2026

Personal information
- Born: June 19, 1998 (age 28) St Helier, Jersey

Chess career
- Country: Jersey
- Title: Woman Candidate Master (2024)
- Years active: 2022-present
- FIDE rating: 1696
- Peak rating: 1696 (May 2026)

Tallulah Roberts (born 19 June 1998), also known online as LulaRobs or lularobs, is a chess player, commentator and content creator associated with Jersey. She holds the Woman Candidate Master (WCM) title awarded by FIDE, the international chess federation.

== Chess career ==
Roberts began playing chess in 2020, inspired by the popular Netflix show The Queen's Gambit, moving into streaming on Twitch in early 2021.

In April 2022, Roberts competed at the Reykjavik Open in Iceland. Following the event, she spoke publicly about incidents of harassment during the event, including unwanted physical contact and disrespectful behaviour by male players. Later that year, she represented Jersey in the women's competition at the 44th Chess Olympiad. The team marked Jersey's first participation in the women's Olympiad competition. Roberts played on board one and scored four points from ten games. Roberts also competed at the 46th Guernsey International Chess Festival, ranking 102nd with two points.

By 2024, Roberts had earned her Woman Candidate Master title. She returned to the Reykjavik Open, finishing with 3.5 points and an overall tournament rank of 325th. Roberts would take part in the Maia Chess Open of the same year in Portugal, finishing with 4 points and a ranking of 126th. She also took part in the XTX Markets London Chess Classic at the Emirates Stadium. In the under 2000 rated category, Roberts finished with 4.5 points.

In March 2025, Roberts appeared in the BBC Two chess competition programme Chess Masters: The Endgame. She progressed through the competition to the final episode, where she was eliminated before the final match. In 2026, Roberts organised an exhibition in Jersey featuring Grandmasters Bachar Kouatly and Radosław Jedynak competing against players from the island.

== Personal life ==
Roberts was born in Jersey. She now resides in Paris, France.

== See also ==
- Chess Olympiad
- Woman Candidate Master
- Women in chess
