= Chess Masters: The Endgame =

British television chess gameshow

- Genre: Reality; Gameshow
- Presented by: Sue Perkins
- Starring: David Howell; Anthony Mathurin
- Country of origin: United Kingdom
- Original language: English
- No. of series: 1
- No. of episodes: 8

Production
- Executive producer: Charlie Bunce
- Producer: Katy Fryer
- Production locations: The Coal Exchange, Cardiff
- Running time: 30 minutes
- Production company: Curve Media Ltd

Original release
- Network: BBC Two
- Release: 10 March – 28 April 2025

Related
- The Master Game

Chess Masters: The Endgame is a British television competition programme that first aired on BBC Two between 10 March and 28 April 2025. The show is a spiritual successor to former BBC Two series The Master Game. It follows an elimination format, similar to The Great British Bake Off.

== Format ==
The 12 contestants are split across two heats. The heats consist of the first six episodes of the eight-episode run, three for each side of the draw. The players compete in a series of rapid chess matches, puzzles, memory tests and alternative chess formats (e.g. Fischer Random) throughout the heats. Each episode consists of two challenges and an Eliminator. In the heats, winning any challenge grants contestants a guaranteed pass to the next episode. The two contestants who fail to win a challenge compete in an Eliminator to decide who progresses to the next episode and who is ultimately eliminated from the show.

In the penultimate episode, the six surviving players return to compete against one another, before four progress to the final. For this episode, the last place contestant in the second challenge is also eliminated from the show. In the final episode, two players are eliminated through challenges leading to a final match between the two remaining players. The winner of this match is the winner of the series.

== Series overview ==
Series	Episodes	Premiere	Finale	Winner
1	8	10 March 2025	28 April 2025	Thalia Holmes

=== Series 1 (2025) ===
Final Game
Richie Kelly vs. Thalia Holmes

Position: g8 black king, b7 black pawn, g7 black pawn, a6 black rook, e6 black pawn, h6 black pawn, a5 black queen, d5 black pawn, e5 white knight, g5 black bishop, a4 black pawn, c4 black pawn, d4 white pawn, a3 white pawn, e3 white pawn, g3 white pawn, b2 white pawn, c2 white queen, g2 white bishop, h2 white pawn, f1 white rook, g1 white king

In this position, Kelly played Qf2. A better move would have been Qg6.

The first series of Chess Masters: The Endgame began on 10 March 2025 on BBC Two, and concluded on 28 April 2025. The show was hosted by Sue Perkins, supported by experts David Howell and former Traitors contestant Anthony Mathurin. The contestants were generally of average club player strength and came from a wide variety of backgrounds. The first episode attracted almost 900,000 viewers. During the course of the series, the contestants completed challenges set by Howell, alongside playing against special guest Bodhana Sivanandan in the semi-final, and Howell himself in the final. Magnus Carlsen also made cameo appearances for memory challenges in episodes 3 and 6. Thalia Holmes won the first series, beating Richie Kelly in the final game, after Kelly missed a win and got into time trouble.

Player	Age	Nickname	Hometown
Cai Brigden	34	The Unruly Knight	London, England
Caitlin Reid	25	The Smiling Assassin	Glasgow, Scotland
Claire Gorman	50	Killer Queen	Neath, Wales
Craig Robinson	33	The Python	Spalding, England
Deema Khunda	27	The Patient Predator	Leamington Spa, England
Kelechi 'Kel' Nkwonta	39	The Action Man	Bolton, England
Tallulah 'Lula' Roberts	26	The Chess Princess	Paris, France
Navi Dhinsa	46	The Unrelenting Warrior	Kent, England
Nessie (Note: Nessie is the only player from the first series whose full name is unknown, due to her not being a regular club or competitive player.)	27	Black Panther	London, England
Nick Templar	56	The Swashbuckler	London, England
Richie Kelly	63	The Strategist	Liverpool, England
Thalia Holmes	20	The Tactician	Chester, England

Ranking	Contestant	Episode			Ranking	Contestant	Episode		
Ranking	Contestant	1	2	3	Ranking	Contestant	4	5	6
-	Tallulah Roberts	IN1	IN2	IN2	-	Thalia Holmes	IN1	IN1	IN2
-	Caitlin Reid	IN1	IN1	IN2	-	Richie Kelly	IN2	IN2	IN2
-	Navi Dhinsa	FIN	FIN	FIN	-	Kelechi Nkwonta	IN1	FIN	FIN
7	Claire Gorman	IN2	IN2	ELIM	7	Deema Khunda	IN1	IN2	ELIM
9	Cai Bridgen	IN1	ELIM		9	Craig Robinson	FIN	ELIM	
11	Nick Templar	ELIM			11	Nessie	ELIM		

Key:

IN1 The contestant won the first challenge.
IN2 The contestant won the second challenge.
FIN The contestant won in the eliminator at the end of the episode.
ELIM The contestant was eliminated from the show.

Ranking	Contestant	Episode 7			Episode 8		
Ranking	Contestant	1	2	3	1	2	3
1	Thalia Holmes	IN	-	-	IN	IN	WINNER
2	Richie Kelly	IN	-	-	IN	IN	RUNNER UP
3	Kelechi Nkwonta	IN	-	-	IN	ELIM	
4	Tallulah Roberts	LOSS	IN	IN	ELIM		
5	Navi Dhinsa	LOSS	IN	ELIM			
6	Caitlin Reid	LOSS	ELIM				

Key:

WINNER The contestant won the final challenge, and was crowned the show's winner.
RUNNER UP The contestant lost in the final challenge, and was the show's runner up.
IN The contestant won a challenge, and remained in the competition.
LOSS The contestant lost a non-elimination challenge.
ELIM The contestant lost an elimination challenge, and was eliminated.

== Response ==
=== Critical response ===
The Telegraph described Chess Masters: The Endgame as "quietly compelling", whilst The Times described the show as having "a wholesome nerdy charm". The first series of Chess Masters: The Endgame marks the first time that chess has been on mainstream TV for around 32 years.

Chess Masters: The Endgame has also received criticism. Reviewing the first episode, Lucy Mangan of The Guardian described the show as "so dull it's almost unwatchable". Long-standing Guardian chess columnist Leonard Barden noted that reaction to the show was polarised; players with some club or competitive experience often disliked it, finding it too simplistic and overly dramatic, while non-players and curious beginners tended to like it more.

=== Viewers ===
Chess Masters also recorded a 5.5% viewer share, with 890,000 viewers in the first episode, dipping to 535,000 in episode two. The final was viewed by 655,000 people. The average viewers for the same slot is 1.7 million.
