= Sarah Potomak =

Canadian ice hockey player

- Born: December 19, 1997 (age 28) Aldergrove, British Columbia
- Height: 5 ft 5 in (165 cm)
- Weight: 141 lb (64 kg; 10 st 1 lb)
- Position: Forward
- Shoots: Left
- team Former teams: PWHPA; Minnesota Golden Gophers
- National team: Canada
- Playing career: 2015–present
Medal record
World Championships
Gold medal – first place	2022 Denmark
Silver medal – second place	2017 United States
World U18 Championships
Gold medal – first place	2014 Hungary
Silver medal – second place	2015 United States

Sarah Potomak (born December 19, 1997) is a Canadian ice hockey player who competed with the Under-18 Canadian national women's hockey team. She made her debut with the Canada women's national ice hockey team at the 2015 4 Nations Cup, held in November 2015 in Sundsvall, Sweden. Along with her sister Amy Potomak, they are the first sister duo named to the roster of Canada's national women's ice hockey team. The two played together in a two-game series against the United States national women's ice hockey team in December 2016.

== Playing career ==
Along with fellow British Columbia resident Micah Zandee-Hart, Potomak was invited to participate in the IIHF’s 2013 Women’s High Performance Camp in Sheffield, England. Potomak and Hart were also members of Team BC that competed at the 2012 and 2013 Canadian Women’s U18 National Hockey Championships.

She was a member of Team BC’s women’s ice hockey team, playing alongside her sister Amy Potomak, at the 2015 Canada Winter Games. Team BC finished the event in sixth place.

=== Team Canada ===
Potomak won a gold medal at the 2014 IIHF World Women's U18 Championship in Budapest, Hungary where she collected 8 points. She won silver at the 2015 IIHF World Women's U18 Championship in Buffalo, New York where she collected 9 points. She played for the national team at the 2017 IIHF Women's World Championship. She won a silver medal and collected 1 assist. She was named to Canada's National Women's Team for the 2018 Four Nations Cup but was unable to pay due to an injury.

=== NCAA ===
Potomak made her debut for the Minnesota Golden Gophers in a September 25, 2015 exhibition match against the Minnesota Whitecaps logging two assists on goals scored by Hannah Brandt as the squad prevailed by a 5-4 tally.

Her regular season debut took place on October 1, 2015 in a 2-0 win against Penn State. Potomak scored an empty net goal, for the first goal of her NCAA career. In a two-game sweep of St. Cloud State on October 9–10, 2015, Potomak accumulated two goals and four assists. In the second game against St. Cloud, she logged the first multi-goal game of her NCAA career.

An 11-1 win against the MSU-Mankato Mavericks in November 2015 saw Potomak tie the program record for most points in one game. She registered seven points, consisting two goals and five assists. Potomak was featured in Sports Illustrated’s Faces in the Crowd segment for the week of December 14, 2015. She scored her 100th career point in the series sweep against North Dakota on February 10–11, 2017.

During the 2017–18 season, she redshirted the season to centralize with Canada’s National Women’s Team in preparation for the 2018 Winter Olympic Games in PyeongChang, South Korea. She was released from the team in December 2017.

She finished her collegiate career with 179 points.

== Coaching ==
Potomak joined the Trinity Western University women's hockey team as an assistant coach prior to the 2020-21 season. While coaching, she also studied to earn her master's degree in leadership and education. Her sister Amy joined the team for the 2022-23 season as a grad transfer.

== Statistics ==
=== NCAA ===
Season	Team	League	GP	G	A	Pts	PIM
2015-16	Minnesota Golden Gophers	NCAA	38	15	39	54	6
2016-17	Minnesota Golden Gophers	NCAA	38	20	33	53	2
2018-19	Minnesota Golden Gophers	NCAA	33	11	15	26	2
2019-20	Minnesota Golden Gophers	NCAA	36	19	27	46	6
NCAA Totals			145	65	114	179	16

Statistics source

== Awards and honours ==
- Top Forward, 2012 Canadian U18 Nationals

=== Hockey Canada ===
- Leading scorer, 2014 IIHF World Women's U18 Championships
- IIHF Directorate Award, Top Forward, 2015 IIHF World Women's U18 Championships
- Most Valuable Player, 2015 IIHF World Women's U18 Championships
- Media All-Star Team, 2015 IIHF World Women's U18 Championships

=== NCAA ===
- 2015-16 WCHA Preseason Rookie of the Year
- WCHA Rookie of the Week (Week of October 13, 2015)
- WCHA Player of the Week (Recognized for games of October 14–15, 2016)
- WCHA Player of the Month (October 2016)
- 2016 Women's Hockey Commissioners Association National Rookie of the Year
- 2016 WCHA Rookie of the Year honors
- Most Outstanding Player Award, 2016 NCAA National Collegiate Women's Ice Hockey Tournament
- 2017 Patty Kazmaier Award Top-10 Finalist
- All-WCHA Second Team
- All-USCHO Third Team
- WCHA All-Academic Team
- Academic All-Big Ten honoree
- WCHA Offensive Player of the Week (Week of October 15, 2017)
- WCHA Offensive Player of the Month (October 2017)
- Preseason All-WCHA honoree
- WCHA All-Academic Team
- Academic All-Big Ten honoree
- WCHA Forward of the Week (Week of February 26, 2019)
- WCHA Forward of the Month (February 2019)
- All-WCHA Third Team
- Big Ten Distinguished Scholar
- WCHA Scholar-Athlete
- WCHA All-Academic
- Academic All-Big Ten honoree
- WCHA Forward of the Month (November 2019)
- WCHA Forward of the Week (Week of January 5, 2020)

== Personal ==
Her brother, Brandon Potomak is a member of the Moose Jaw Warriors. He captured a gold medal in ice hockey at the 2011 Canada Winter Games. Younger sister Amy played with her at the University of Minnesota for the 2018–19 and 2019–20 seasons.
