= Vendula Přibylová =

Czech ice hockey player (born 1996)

- Born: 23 March 1996 (age 30) Olomouc, Czech Republic
- Height: 1.71 m (5 ft 7 in)
- Weight: 76 kg (168 lb; 12 st 0 lb)
- Position: Forward
- Shoots: Left
- SDHL team Former teams: MoDo Hockey; AIK Hockey; Maine Black Bears; SK Karviná
- National team: Czech Republic
- Playing career: 2011–present
Medal record
World Championship
Bronze medal – third place	2022 Denmark
Bronze medal – third place	2023 Canada

Vendula Přibylová (born 23 March 1996) is a Czech ice hockey player for MoDo Hockey Dam of the Swedish Women's Hockey League (SDHL) and a member of the Czech Republic women's national ice hockey team. She played college ice hockey at Maine from 2016 to 2020.

== International career ==
As a junior player with the Czech national under-18 team, she participated in the IIHF U18 Women's World Championships in 2012, 2013, and 2014, winning a bronze medal at the 2013 tournament.

Přibylová has represented the Czech Republic at the IIHF World Women's Championship in 2013, 2016, 2017, 2019, 2021, 2022, and 2023, and at the Division I A tournaments in 2012, 2014, and 2015.
