= Julia Åberg =

Swedish ice hockey player

- Born: 12 July 1996 (age 30) Stockholm, Sweden
- Height: 1.78 m (5 ft 10 in)
- Weight: 79 kg (174 lb; 12 st 6 lb)
- Position: Goaltender
- Catches: Left
- Damettan team Former teams: SDE Hockey 2 Leksands IF; Djurgårdens IF; Johnson & Wales Wildcats; AIK IF
- National team: Sweden
- Playing career: 2011–present

Julia Åberg (born 12 July 1996) is a Swedish ice hockey goaltender. She has made over 100 Swedish Women's Hockey League (SDHL) appearances with Leksands IF Dam and played intermittently for the Swedish national team.

== Career ==
Åberg grew up in Stockholm, playing with IK Göta as a child.

In 2011, she signed with Leksands IF of the Riksserien (renamed SDHL in 2016). Ahead of the 2014–15 season, Swedish national team starter Sara Grahn deemed her the most promising goaltending talent in the country.

From 2013 to 2016, she only played thirteen SDHL games, spending two seasons in Leksands and one with Djurgårdens IF Hockey. Åberg missed significant time due to injuries that required multiple surgeries for herniated discs and torn cruciate ligaments.

She spent the 2016–17 season in North America, playing with the Johnson & Wales Wildcats women's ice hockey program of the NCAA Division III in Providence, Rhode Island. She had originally planned to play for an NCAA Division I university, but lost her scholarship after her injuries. She was able to play the entire season with the university without suffering any additional injuries, posting a save percentage of .955.

She returned to Sweden to rejoin Leksands ahead of the 2017–18 season. She made a 42-save shutout against Linköping HC in January 2019.

Åberg announced her retirement from ice hockey after the end of the 2018–19 season, citing exhaustion and financial insecurity. She made an unexpected return to Leksands in December 2019, temporarily stepping in as the club suffered a goaltending crisis due to injuries. She made a handful of appearances as a defenseman for the Damtvåan (Division 2) club Falu IF during the 2019–20 and 2020–21 seasons.

In April 2020, it was reported that she was considering making a comeback to SDHL.

As of the 2021–22 season, Åberg is goaltending with the secondary team of SDE Hockey in the Damettan (Division 1).

=== International career ===
She was named to the Swedish roster for the 2019 IIHF Women's World Championship as the backup to Sara Grahn, but did not see any ice time.

== Personal life ==
Åberg currently works as a firefighter.
