= Kirsten Welsh =

Canadian ice hockey referee

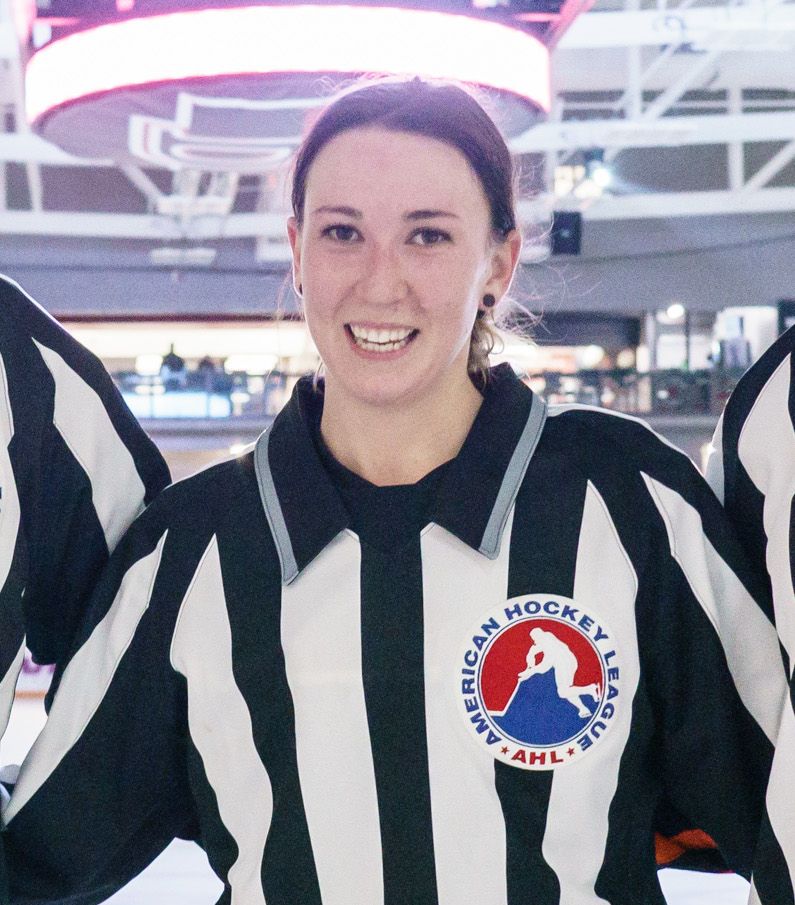
- Born: 1997 (age 28–29) Port Perry, Ontario, Canada
- Height: 5 ft 11 in (180 cm)
- Weight: 170 lb (77 kg; 12 st 2 lb)
- Position: Defence
- Shot: Right
- Played for: Robert Morris Colonials
- Playing career: 2012–2019

Kirsten Welsh (born 1997) is a Canadian ice hockey official, currently serving as a linesman in the American Hockey League (AHL) and Ontario Hockey League (OHL). A retired ice hockey defenceman, she played college ice hockey with the Robert Morris Colonials in the College Hockey America (CHA) conference of the NCAA Division 1 during 2015 to 2019.

== Officiating career ==
In September 2019, Welsh became one of four women to officiate at the NHL level for the first time, working in an NHL Prospect Tournament hosted by the Buffalo Sabres at the HARBORcenter from September 7 through 10.

Welsh was also joined by Kelly Cooke, Katie Guay, and Kendall Hanley as officials who worked the Elite Women's 3-on-3 event at the 2020 National Hockey League All-Star Game at Enterprise Center in St. Louis. Of note, Cooke and Guay served in the capacity of referees, while Hanley and Welsh were the linesmen.

Welsh served as a linesperson during the 2026 Winter Olympics.

== Awards and honors ==
CHA

- 2015–16 CHA All-Tournament Team
- 2016–17 All-CHA First Team
- 2017–18 All-CHA First Team
- 2017–18 CHA Defender of the Year

USCHO

- 2015–16 All-USCHO Rookie Team
