= Fabienne Peter (ice hockey) =

Swiss ice hockey player

- Position: Forward
- Played for: EHC Basel Ladies
- Playing career: 2018–2020

Fabienne Peter is a Swiss retired ice hockey player. She played with EHC Basel Ladies in the SWHL C during 2018 to 2020.

In autumn 2018, Peter became the first transgender woman to play in a Swiss ice hockey league. In response to her application to join the women's team of EHC Basel, the Swiss Ice Hockey Association unanimously adopted a policy that allowed transgender players to take part in the sport, based on the guidelines of the International Olympic Committee.
