= Annemarie Sylvia Meier =

German chess player (born 1957)

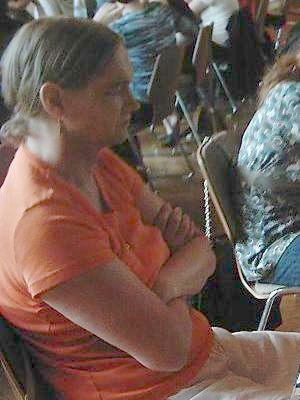
- Annemarie Sylvia Meier in 2008

Personal information
- Born: 19 February 1957 (age 69) Bochum, Germany

Chess career
- Country: Germany
- Peak rating: 2300 (January 2004)

Annemarie Sylvia Meier (born 19 February 1957) is a German chess player who won the German Women's Chess Championship (2003).

== Biography ==
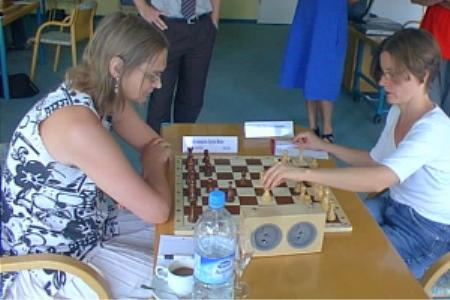
Annemarie Meier (left), 2003 at the German Women's Chess Championship in Altenkirchen (Westerwald)

Annemarie Meier won the German Women's Chess Championship in Altenkirchen in 2003. She has won the German Women's Blitz Chess Championship twice (1996 and 2004) and has won the German Women's Rapid Chess Championships (1997).

Annemarie Meier played with the Stuttgarter Schachfreunde 1879 in the Chess Women's Bundesliga season 2001/02. At the German Women's State Team Chess Championship in 2008 in Braunfels, she got four points from five games for Württemberg on the first board.

Meier graduated from high school at the age of 17 and, at her father's request, began studying mathematics, which she dropped out of. At the age of 25, Meier came out as transgender. She played chess in Tübingen until 1980 and, after a 15-year break, began playing chess again in 1995, this time in Stuttgart and since then in the women's area.

Annemarie Meier is listed as inactive at FIDE because she has not played an Elo rated game since the 2011/12 season of the 2nd Chess Women's Bundesliga. She achieved a norm for the title Women's International Master (WIM) at the International Women's Chess Tournament in Wangen im Allgäu in 1997.
