= Nadezhda Morozova (ice hockey) =

Russian ice hockey player

Nadezhda Morozova Надежда Морозова
- Born: 29 November 1996 (age 29) Moscow, Russia
- Height: 1.70 m (5 ft 7 in)
- Weight: 77 kg (170 lb; 12 st 2 lb)
- Position: Goaltender
- Shoots: Left
- ZhHL team Former teams: Dinamo-Neva St. Petersburg; Biryusa Krasnoyarsk
- National team: Russia
- Playing career: 2014–present
Medal record
World Championship
Bronze medal – third place	2016 Canada
Universiade
Gold medal – first place	2015 Granada	Ice hockey
Gold medal – first place	2017 Astana-Almaty	Ice hockey
Gold medal – first place	2019 Krasnoyarsk	Ice hockey

Nadezhda Fyodorovna Morozova (Russian: Надежда Фёдоровна Морозова; born 29 November 1996) is a Russian ice hockey goaltender and member of the Russian national ice hockey team, currently playing in the Zhenskaya Hockey League (ZhHL) with Dinamo-Neva Saint Petersburg.

== Career ==
Morozova competed with the Russian national team since 2015 and has represented Russia at four IIHF Women's World Championships, in 2016, 2017, 2019, and 2021 (as Russian Olympic Committee), and in the women's ice hockey tournament at the 2018 Winter Olympics, and won gold medals in the women's ice hockey tournaments at the Winter Universiades in 2015, 2017, and 2019.

== Career statistics ==
=== International ===
Year	Team	Event	Result	GP	W	L	T/OT	MIN	GA	SO	GAA	SV%
2018	Russia	OG	4th	5	1	3	0	255:56	16	0	3.75	0.885
