= Katie Guay =

American ice hockey official and player

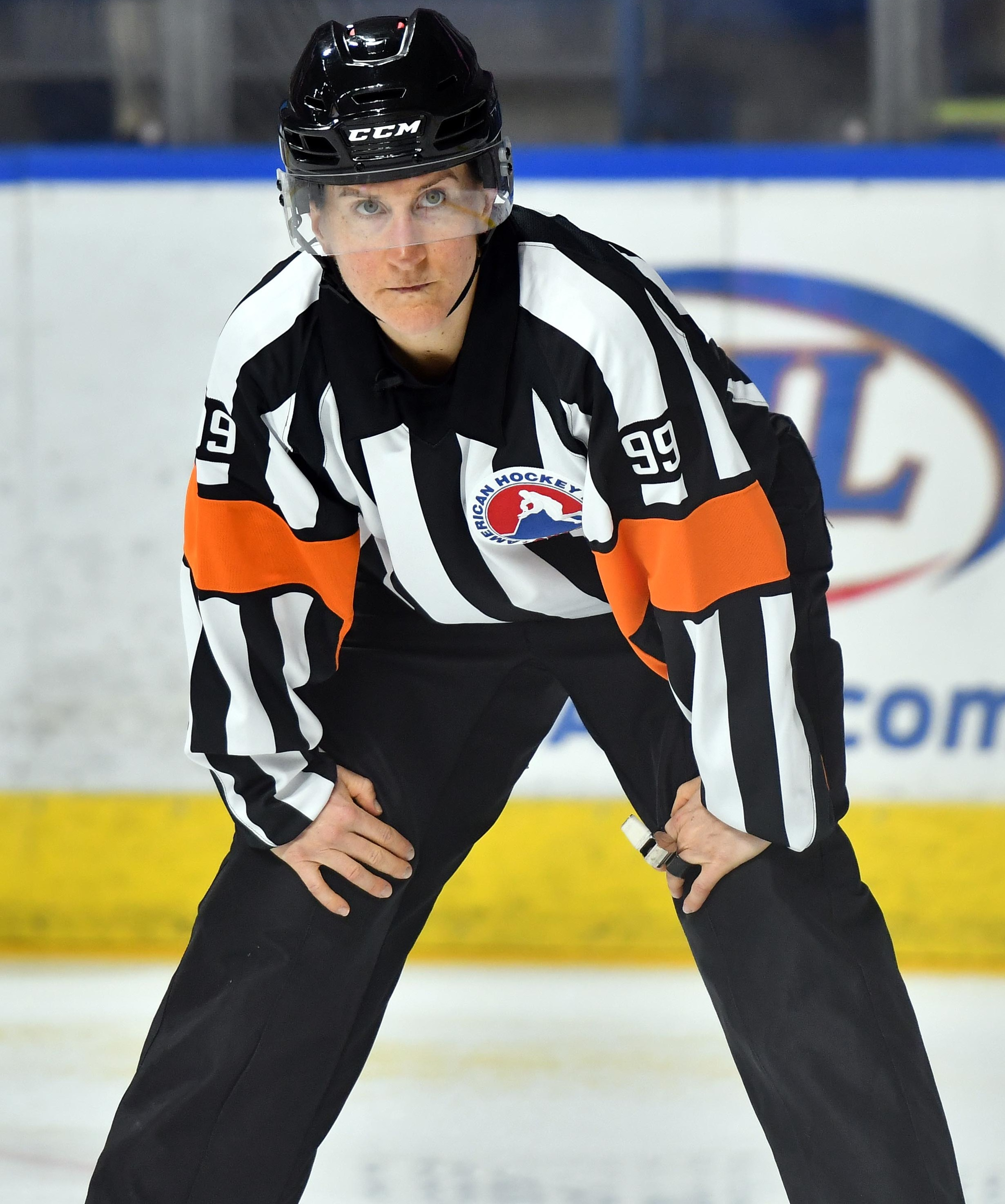
- Guay in 2021
- Born: 1982 (age 43–44) Westfield, Massachusetts, U.S.
- Height: 5 ft 6 in (168 cm)
- Position: Forward
- Shot: Left
- Played for: Brown Bears
- Playing career: 2001–2005

Katie Guay (born 1982) is a retired American ice hockey official who served as a referee in the National Hockey League (NHL) and American Hockey League (AHL). Guay played college ice hockey with the Brown Bears during 2001 to 2005 and was team captain for the 2004–05 season.

== Officiating career ==
Guay took up officiating in 2006, shortly after graduating from Brown University. She has officiated at eight International Ice Hockey Federation tournaments, most notably the women's ice hockey tournament at the 2018 Winter Olympics.

In November 2014, Guay and Erin Blair became the first female officials to referee a Southern Professional Hockey League (SPHL) game – the same game in which Shannon Szabados became the first female goaltender to win a SPHL game, when the Columbus Cottonmouths defeated the Fayetteville FireAntz 5–4 in overtime.

Guay was one of the first four women to officiate at the NHL level, working in an NHL Prospect Tournament hosted by the Anaheim Ducks at Great Park Ice in Irvine, California during September 7 through 10, 2019.

Alongside Kelly Cooke, Kendall Hanley, and Kirsten Welsh, Guay served as an official for the Elite Women's 3-on-3 event at the 2020 National Hockey League All-Star Game at Enterprise Center in St. Louis.

Guay is the Scouting and Development Officiating Manager for the NHL as of 2023.

Guay is the Director of Officiating, Training, Development & Recruitment for the Professional Women's Hockey League (PWHL) as of 2025.
