= Russia women's national under-18 ice hockey team =

Russia
- Nickname: Большая красная машина (The Big Red Machine)
- Association: Ice Hockey Federation of Russia
- General manager: Olga Votolovskaya
- Head coach: Yevgeni Bobariko
- Assistants: Sergei Mylnikov; Vladislav Prodan
- Captain: Alina Orlova
- Most games: Polina Bolgareva (24)
- Top scorer: Liudmila Belyakova (18)
- Most points: Liudmila Belyakova (26)
- Team colors
- IIHF code: RUS

First international
- Finland 10 – 3 Russia (Moscow, Russia; November 19, 2006)

Biggest win
- Russia 19 – 0 Kazakhstan (Dmitrov, Russia; March 23, 2011)

Biggest defeat
- United States 17 – 0 Russia (Füssen, Germany; January 5, 2009)

IIHF World Women's U18 Championships
- Appearances: 12 (first in 2008)
- Best result: (2015, 2017, 2020)

Medal record

IIHF World Women's U18 Championships
Bronze medal – third place	2015 USA	
Bronze medal – third place	2017 Czech Republic	
Bronze medal – third place	2020 Slovakia	

Russia women's national under-18 ice hockey team represents Russia at the International Ice Hockey Federation's IIHF World Women's U18 Championships. The Russia women's national U18 team is controlled by Ice Hockey Federation of Russia. After the Russian invasion of Ukraine, the International Ice Hockey Federation suspended Russia from all levels of competition.

== World Women's U18 Championship record ==
Year	GP	W	OTW	OTL	L	GF	GA	GD	Pts	Rank
2008	5	0	0	0	5	4	37	–33	0	8th
2009	5	1	1	1	2	10	29	–19	6	7th
2010	5	0	0	0	5	6	21	–15	0	8th ▼
2011	5	5	0	0	0	44	2	+42	15	9th ▲
2012	6	1	1	0	4	12	25	–13	5	7th
2013	5	1	2	0	2	18	22	–4	7	7th
2014	6	3	0	1	2	12	11	+1	10	4th
2015	6	3	0	0	3	16	18	–2	9	3rd place, bronze medalist(s)
2016	6	2	0	0	4	9	19	–10	6	4th
2017	6	2	1	0	3	9	17	–8	8	3rd place, bronze medalist(s)
2018	6	2	0	0	4	10	16	–6	6	4th
2019	6	1	1	1	3	13	19	–6	6	4th
2020	6	3	0	1	2	16	10	+6	10	3rd place, bronze medalist(s)
2021	Cancelled due to the COVID-19 pandemic									
2022	Expelled due to the Russian invasion of Ukraine									
2023	Expelled due to the Russian invasion of Ukraine									
2024	Expelled due to the Russian invasion of Ukraine									
2025	Expelled due to the Russian invasion of Ukraine									
2026	Expelled due to the Russian invasion of Ukraine									
