= Daria Teryoshkina =

Russian ice hockey player

- Born: 11 January 1998 (age 27) Chelyabinsk, Russia
- Height: 1.69 m (5 ft 7 in)
- Weight: 75 kg (165 lb; 11 st 11 lb)
- Position: Defence
- Shoots: Left
- HE team Former teams: Maine Black Bears; Fakel Chelyabinsk; Belye Medveditsy; HTI Stars
- National team: Russia
- Playing career: 2013–present

Daria Teryoshkina (born 11 January 1998) is a Russian ice hockey player for Maine Black Bears and the Russian national team.

She represented Russia at the 2019 IIHF Women's World Championship.
