= Finland women's national under-18 ice hockey team =

Finland
- Nickname: Tyttöleijonat (Finnish); Flicklejonen (Swedish); ('Girl Lions')
- Association: Finnish Ice Hockey Association
- Head coach: Mira Kuisma
- Assistants: Heikki Kemppainen; Juho Lehto; Aku Perala
- Captain: Senja Siivonen (2026)
- Most games: Nelli Laitinen (22); Krista Parkkonen (22)
- Top scorer: Sanni Hakala (9); Emma Nuutinen (9); Susanna Tapani (9)
- Most points: Emma Nuutinen (17)
- IIHF code: FIN
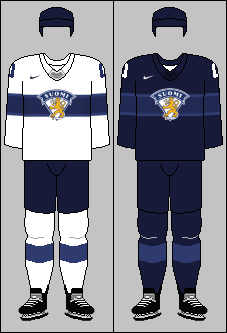

First international
- Germany 4 – 2 Finland (Calgary, Canada; January 7, 2008)

Biggest win
- Finland 11 – 1 France (St. Catharines, Canada; January 8, 2016)

Biggest defeat
- Canada 17 – 0 Finland (Calgary, Canada; January 9, 2008)

U18 World Championship
- Appearances: 14 (first in 2008)
- Best result: Bronze: (2011, 2019, 2022)

International record (W–L–T)
- 27–29–0

Medal record

U18 World Championship
Bronze medal – third place	2011 Sweden	
Bronze medal – third place	2019 Japan	
Bronze medal – third place	2022 USA	

The Finnish women's national under-18 ice hockey team (Finnish: Suomen alle 18-vuotiaiden naisten jääkiekkomaajoukkue) is the national women's junior ice hockey team of Finland, which represents Finland at the International Ice Hockey Federation's Ice Hockey U18 Women's World Championship and other international U18 tournaments.

The team is officially nicknamed the Tyttöleijonat (lit. 'Girl Lions') (Note: All Finnish national ice hockey teams have nicknames incorporating lions in reference to the Finnish lion, i.e. the men's national team is nicknamed the Leijonat (lit. 'Lions') and the women's national team is nicknamed the Naisleijonat (lit. 'Lady Lions' or Lionesses).) in Finnish and the nickname is regularly used in Finnish-language media. The official nickname in Swedish is Flicklejonen (lit. 'Girl Lions') and the nickname is frequently used to refer to the team in Swedish-language media published in Finland.

== U18 Women's World Championship record ==
Year	GP	W	OTW	OTL	L	GF	GA	Pts	Rank
(Canada) 2008	5	1	0	0	4	8	37	3	6th place
(Germany) 2009	5	1	2	0	2	5	11	8	5th place
(United States) 2010	5	2	0	1	2	11	12	7	5th place
(Sweden) 2011	6	2	1	0	3	11	16	8	(bronze) Won bronze medal
(Czech Republic) 2012	5	2	0	1	2	12	17	4	5th place
(Finland) 2013	5	3	0	0	2	13	12	9	5th place
(Hungary) 2014	5	1	1	1	2	11	18	6	5th place
(United States) 2015	5	3	0	0	2	13	9	9	5th place
(Canada) 2016	5	2	0	0	3	15	10	6	6th place
(Czech Republic) 2017	5	3	0	1	1	10	6	10	5th place
(Russia) 2018	5	3	0	0	2	11	9	9	5th place
(Japan) 2019	6	3	2	0	1	15	13	14	(bronze) Won bronze medal
(Slovakia) 2020	6	1	0	0	5	9	23	3	4th place
(Sweden) ~~2021~~	Cancelled due to the COVID-19 pandemic								
(United States) 2022	5	2	0	0	3	9	11	6	(bronze) Won bronze medal
(Sweden) 2023	6	1	0	1	4	7	32	4	4th place
(Switzerland) 2024	6	3	0	0	3	14	24	9	4th place
(Finland) 2025	4	1	0	1	2	5	15	4	6th place
(Canada) 2026	5	0	0	0	5	8	47	0	8th place relegated to 2027 Division I A
(Finland) 2027									(Division 1 A)

== Team ==
=== Current roster ===
Roster for the 2025 IIHF U18 Women's World Championship.

Head coach: Mira Kuisma
Assistant coaches: Heikki Kemppainen, Juho Lehto, Aku Perala (goaltender)

No.	Pos.	Name	Height	Weight	Birthdate	Team
1	G	Kerttu Kuja-Halkola	1.74 m (5 ft 9 in)	70 kg (150 lb)	2 September 2007 (age 19)	(Finland) Team Kuortane
2	D	Nelly Andersson	1.61 m (5 ft 3 in)	85 kg (187 lb)	11 June 2007 (age 19)	(Finland) HIFK Helsinki
3	D	Neea Ketola	1.66 m (5 ft 5 in)	66 kg (146 lb)	22 August 2008 (age 18)	(Finland) Team Kuortane
4	D	Oona Hämäläinen	1.63 m (5 ft 4 in)	75 kg (165 lb)	27 March 2008 (age 18)	(Finland) Team Kuortane
8	D	Katariina Junnila	1.74 m (5 ft 9 in)	64 kg (141 lb)	3 January 2009 (age 17)	(Germany) Löwen Frankfurt U17
9	D	Viola Kärkkäinen	1.69 m (5 ft 7 in)	62 kg (137 lb)	13 June 2009 (age 17)	(Finland) Pohti Pyhäjärvi U15
10	D	Fanny Kyrkkö	1.60 m (5 ft 3 in)	54 kg (119 lb)	8 September 2010 (age 16)	(Finland) HC Nokia U15
11	D	Viivi-Maija Ruonakoski	1.67 m (5 ft 6 in)	69 kg (152 lb)	23 September 2009 (age 17)	(Finland) Kärpät Oulu
12	D	Elli Pohjanaho – A	1.65 m (5 ft 5 in)	77 kg (170 lb)	6 February 2007 (age 19)	(Finland) HC Nokia U15
13	F	Yenna Kolmonen	1.67 m (5 ft 6 in)	62 kg (137 lb)	5 November 2009 (age 17)	(Finland) Team Kuortane
15	F	Siiri Friederiksen	1.58 m (5 ft 2 in)	64 kg (141 lb)	19 April 2008 (age 18)	(Finland) TPS Turku
16	F	Ella Hautala	1.70 m (5 ft 7 in)	67 kg (148 lb)	5 May 2008 (age 18)	(Finland) Kärpät Oulu
18	F	Emmi Loponen	1.65 m (5 ft 5 in)	64 kg (141 lb)	20 February 2009 (age 17)	(Finland) Kiekko Laser
19	F	Tuulianna Artti	1.57 m (5 ft 2 in)	48 kg (106 lb)	14 March 2010 (age 16)	(Finland) KJT Haukat U15
20	F	Vilma Nurmisto – A	1.68 m (5 ft 6 in)	59 kg (130 lb)	23 August 2007 (age 19)	(Finland) TPS Turku
21	F	Jannika Sten	1.74 m (5 ft 9 in)	72 kg (159 lb)	20 March 2008 (age 18)	(Finland) Pelicans Lahti U16
22	F	Senja Siivonen	1.69 m (5 ft 7 in)	63 kg (139 lb)	2 May 2008 (age 18)	(Finland) Team Kuortane
23	F	Minea Huovinen	1.48 m (4 ft 10 in)	46 kg (101 lb)	5 May 2009 (age 17)	(Finland) Kiekko-75 Leppävirta
24	F	Julia Kuhta	1.75 m (5 ft 9 in)	60 kg (130 lb)	19 June 2008 (age 18)	(Finland) HIFK Helsinki
25	F	Abigail Byskata – C	1.53 m (5 ft 0 in)	62 kg (137 lb)	7 May 2007 (age 19)	(Finland) Team Kuortane
27	F	Eva Lamberg	1.62 m (5 ft 4 in)	58 kg (128 lb)	24 November 2007 (age 18)	(Finland) HPK Hämeenlinna
28	F	Tinja Tapani	1.62 m (5 ft 4 in)	54 kg (119 lb)	5 March 2009 (age 17)	(Finland) Lukko Rauma
29	F	Sara Loikkanen	1.58 m (5 ft 2 in)	50 kg (110 lb)	11 July 2007 (age 19)	(Finland) HIFK Helsinki
30	G	Annika Saastamoinen	1.70 m (5 ft 7 in)	78 kg (172 lb)	8 May 2007 (age 19)	(Finland) RoKi Rovaniemi
31	G	Emilia Piekkari	1.63 m (5 ft 4 in)	63 kg (139 lb)	25 February 2007 (age 19)	(Finland) Team Kuortane

Team biometrics

- Average age: 16
- Average height: 1.65 m (5 ft 5 in)
- Average weight: 64 kg (141 lb)

=== World Championship player awards ===
Best Defenseman
Selected by the tournament directorate

- 2020: Nelli Laitinen

Best Forward
Selected by the tournament directorate

- 2019: Elisa Holopainen

Best Goaltender
Selected by the tournament directorate

- 2011: Isabella Portnoj
- 2022: Emilia Kyrkkö

All-Star Team
Selected by members of the media

- 2013: Emma Nuutinen (F)
- 2019: Elisa Holopainen (F), Nelli Laitinen (D)
- 2020: Sanni Rantala (D)
- 2022: Emilia Kyrkkö (G), Sanni Vanhanen (F)
- 2023: Pauliina Salonen (F)
- 2024: Emma Ekoluoma (F), Tuuli Tallinen (D)

Top-3 Players on Team
Selected by the coaches

- 2008: Piia Räty (G), Linda Välimäki (F), Maiju Yliniemi (F)
- 2009: Susanna Airaksinen (G), Tiina Saarimäki (D), Tea Villilä (D)
- 2010: Isa Rahunen (D), Salla Rantanen (F), Susanna Tapani (F)
- 2011: Isabella Portnoj (G), Susanna Tapani (F), Saana Valkama (F)
- 2012: Anna Kilponen (D), Johanna Koivisto (D), Anni Rantanen (D)
- 2013: Anna Kilponen (D), Emma Nuutinen (F), Eveliina Suonpää (G)
- 2014: Anni Keisala (G), Marjut Klemola (D), Emmi Rakkolainen (F)
- 2015: Sanni Hakala (F), Anni Keisala (G), Nelli Salomäki (F)
- 2016: Sini Karjalainen (D), Petra Nieminen (F), Tiia Pajarinen (G)
- 2017: Sini Karjalainen (D), Jenniina Nylund (F), Jenna Silvonen (G)
- 2018: Sanni Ahola (G), Elisa Holopainen (F), Nelli Laitinen (D)
- 2019: Elisa Holopainen (F), Nelli Laitinen (D), Sanni Rantala (D)
- 2020: Nelli Laitinen (D), Sanni Rantala (D), Kiira Yrjänen (F)
- 2022: Oona Havana (F), Emilia Kyrkkö (G), Sanni Vanhanen (F)
- 2023: Pauliina Salonen (F), Tuuli Tallinen (D), Sanni Vanhanen (F)
- 2024: Emma Ekoluoma (F), Tuuli Tallinen (D), Kerttu Kuja-Halkola (G)
- 2025: Kerttu Kuja-Halkola (G), Eva Lamberg (F), Tinja Tapani (F)

== See also ==
- Finland women's national ice hockey team
- Naisten Liiga
- Women's ice hockey in Finland
