= List of Ohio State Buckeyes women's ice hockey seasons =

This is a list of seasons completed by the Ohio State Buckeyes women's ice hockey team. The list documents the season-by-season records of the Buckeyes from 2000 to present, including conference and national post season records. The team began club play in 1977 but did not begin intercollegiate play until 1999.

The team won two NCAA titles and two runner-ups.

== Season-by-season results ==
NCAA D-I Champions	NCAA Frozen Four	Conference regular season champions	Conference Playoff Champions

Season	Conference	Regular Season (Note: Code explanation; GP—Games Played, W—Wins, L—Losses, T—Tied games, OTW—Overtime Wins, OTL—Overtime Loses, 3/SW—Win in 3 on 3 overtime or shootout, Pts—Points*)										Conference Tournament Results	National Tournament Results
Season	Conference	Conference					Overall					Conference Tournament Results	National Tournament Results
Season	Conference	GP	W	L	T	Finish	GP	W	L	T	%	Conference Tournament Results	National Tournament Results
Jackie Barto (1999–2011)
1999–00	WCHA	24	6	15	3	5th	37	8	26	3	.257	W Quarterfinals (St. Cloud State); L Semifinals (Minnesota Duluth); W Third Place (Wisconsin)	
2000–01	WCHA	24	11	10	3	5th	37	18	17	2	.514	W Quarterfinals (St. Cloud State); W Semifinals (Minnesota); L Championship (Minnesota Duluth)	
2001–02	WCHA	24	9	12	3	4th	37	18	15	4	.541	W Quarterfinals (Bemidji State); L Semifinals (Minnesota); L Third Place (Minnesota Duluth)	
2002–03	WCHA	24	8	13	3	4th	37	12	22	3	.365	W Quarterfinals (Bemidji State); L Semifinals (Minnesota Duluth); W Third Place (Wisconsin)	
2003–04	WCHA	24	10	12	2	5th	35	16	16	3	.500	W Quarterfinals (Minnesota State); L Semifinals (Minnesota); L Third Place (Wisconsin)	
2004–05	WCHA	28	10	15	3	4th	37	17	17	3	.500	W Quarterfinals (Minnesota State); L Semifinals (Minnesota); L Third Place (Minnesota Duluth)	
2005–06	WCHA	28	12	15	1	5th	36	13	18	5	.431	L Quarterfinals (St. Cloud State)	
2006–07	WCHA	28	13	11	4	4th	37	20	13	4	.595	W Quarterfinals (Minnesota State) L Semifinals (Wisconsin)	
2007–08	WCHA	28	11	14	3	5th	37	17	17	3	.500	L Quarterfinals (St. Cloud State)	
2008–09	WCHA	28	6	20	2	7th	36	8	25	3	.264	L Quarterfinals (Wisconsin)	
2009–10	WCHA	28	12	13	3	6th	37	17	15	5	.527	W Quarterfinals series, 2–0 (Wisconsin); L Semifinals, 4–5 (2OT) (Minnesota)	
2010–11	WCHA	28	8	17	3	6th	36	14	19	3	.431	L Quarterfinals series, 0–2 (Minnesota)	
Nate Handrahan (2011–2015)
2011–12	WCHA	28	13	14	1	5th	36	16	16	4	.500	L Quarterfinals series, 0–2 (Minnesota Duluth)	
2012–13	WCHA	27	12	13	2	5th	37	19	15	3	.554	W Quarterfinals series, 2–0 (Minnesota Duluth) L Semifinals 0–5 (Minnesota)	
2013–14	WCHA	28	9	14	5	5th	37	15	17	5	.473	L Quarterfinals series, 1–2 (Minnesota Duluth)	
2014–15	WCHA	28	12	13	3	6th	36	17	16	3	.514	L Quarterfinals series, 0–2 (North Dakota)	
Jenny Potter (2015–2016)
2015–16	WCHA	28	6	21	1	7th	36	10	25	1	.292	L Quarterfinals series, 0–2 (Minnesota)	
Nadine Muzerall (2016–current)
2016–17	WCHA	28	7	16	5	5th	37	14	18	5	.446	L Quarterfinals series, 1–2 (North Dakota)	
2017–18	WCHA	24	14	6	4	2nd	39	24	11	4	.667	W Quarterfinals series, 2–0 (Minnesota State); L Semifinals 0–2 (Minnesota)	W Quarterfinals, 2–0 (Boston College); L Semifinals, 0–1 (OT) (Clarkson)
2018–19	WCHA	24	12	10	2	3rd	35	20	13	2	.600	W Quarterfinals series, 2–0 (Minnesota State); L Semifinals 2–3 (Wisconsin)	
2019–20	WCHA	26	15	6	5	3rd	38	24	8	6	.711	W Quarterfinals series, 2–0 (Minnesota State); W Semifinals 4–3 (OT) (Minnesota); W Championship, 1–0 (OT) (Wisconsin)	
2020–21	WCHA	16	11	5	0	3rd	20	13	7	0	.650	W Semifinals, 7–2 (Minnesota Duluth); L Championship, 2–3 (OT) (Wisconsin)	W Quarterfinals, 3–1 (Boston College); L Semifinals, 2–4 (Wisconsin)
2021–22	WCHA	27	21	6	0	2nd	38	32	6	0	.842	W Quarterfinals series, 2–0 (St. Cloud State)); W Semifinals, 2–1 (Wisconsin); W Championship, 3–2 (OT) (Minnesota)	W Quarterfinals, 4–3 (2OT) (Quinnipiac); W Semifinals, 2–1 (Yale); W Championship, 3–2 (Minnesota Duluth)
2022–23	WCHA	28	23	4	1	1st	41	33	6	2	.829	W Quarterfinals series, 2–0 (Bemidji State); W Semifinals, 2–1 (Minnesota Duluth); L Championship, 1–3 (Minnesota)	W Quarterfinals, 5–2 (Quinnipiac); W Semifinals, 3–0 (Northeastern); L Championship, 0–1 (Wisconsin)
2023–24	WCHA	28	26	2	0	1st	39	35	4	0	.897	W Quarterfinals series, 2–0 (Bemidji State); W Semifinals, 6–0 (Minnesota Duluth); L Championship, 3–6 (Wisconsin)	W Quarterfinals, 9–0 (Minnesota Duluth); W Semifinals, 4–1 (Clarkson); W Championship, 1–0 (Wisconsin)
2024–25	WCHA	28	19	6	3	2nd	40	29	8	3	.763	W Quarterfinals series, 2–0 (St. Thomas) L Semifinals, 2–6 (Minnesota)	W Quarterfinals, 6–1 (St. Lawrence) W Semifinals, 4–2 (Cornell) L Championship, 3–4 (OT) (Wisconsin)
Totals							GP	W	L	T	%	Championships	
NCAA Post-season							16	12	4	0	.750	2 NCAA Championships	
Total							859	440	383	78	.532		
