= 2008–09 Minnesota Golden Gophers women's ice hockey season =

WCHA regular season champions NCAA Women's Ice Hockey Frozen Four, Lost, Semi-Finals, vs. Mercyhurst 5–4
- Conference: WCHA
- Home ice: Ridder Arena

Record
- Overall: 32–5–3
- Conference: 23–2–3
- Home: 18–3–2
- Road: 14–1–1
- Neutral: 0–1–0

Coaches and captains
- Head coach: Brad Frost
- Assistant coaches: Natalie Darwitz
- Captain(s): Melanie Gagnon; Gigi Marvin

The 2008–09 Minnesota Golden Gophers women's ice hockey season represented the University of Minnesota during the 2008–09 NCAA Division I women's ice hockey season. They were coached by Brad Frost in his second season.

== Regular season ==
=== Standings ===
2008–09 Western Collegiate Hockey Association standings
	Conference								Overall					
	GP	W	L	T	SOW	PTS	GF	GA	GP	W	L	T	GF	GA
Minnesota†	28	23	2	3	2	51	143	42	40	32	5	3	198	69
Wisconsin*	28	21	2	5	3	50	133	42	41	34	2	5	207	53
Minnesota Duluth	28	18	6	4	1	41	109	52	39	26	9	4	150	70
St. Cloud State	28	11	14	3	2	27	63	91	37	15	18	4	85	105
Minnesota State	28	7	16	5	2	21	74	122	36	12	19	5	95	141
North Dakota	28	9	18	3	0	21	62	95	36	13	19	4	84	118
Ohio State	28	6	20	2	2	16	66	135	36	8	25	3	82	166
Bemidji State	28	3	22	3	2	11	38	109	36	6	25	5	51	125
Championship: † indicates conference regular season champion; * indicates conference tournament champion Updated July 21, 2024

=== Schedule ===
As of September 17, 2024.

Date	Time	Opponent^{#}	Rank^{#}	Site	Decision	Result	Attendance	Record
Regular Season
October 3	7:07	Robert Morris*	#3	Ridder Arena • Minneapolis, MN	Hanlon	L 2–3	725	0–1–0
October 4	7:07	Robert Morris*	#3	Ridder Arena • Minneapolis, MN	Grogan	W 7–1	805	1–1–0
October 10	7:37	at #1 Minnesota Duluth	#6	Duluth Entertainment Convention Center • Duluth, MN	Grogan	W 4–3 ^{OT}	1,276	2–1–0 (1–0–0)
October 11	7:07	at #1 Minnesota Duluth	#6	Duluth Entertainment Convention Center • Duluth, MN	Hanlon	W 2–0	1,346	3–1–0 (2–0–0)
October 17	7:07	Ohio State	#2	Ridder Arena • Minneapolis, MN	Grogan	W 8–1	1,484	4–1–0 (3–0–0)
October 18	4:07	Ohio State	#2	Ridder Arena • Minneapolis, MN	Lura	W 8–2	1,087	5–1–0 (4–0–0)
October 24	2:07	at #1 Wisconsin	#2	Kohl Center • Madison, WI	Grogan	T 1–1 ^{OT}	1,216	5–1–1 (4–0–1)
October 26	2:07	at #1 Wisconsin	#2	Kohl Center • Madison, WI	Lura	L 1–2	2,046	5–2–1 (4–1–1)
October 31	6:07	St. Cloud State	#2	Ridder Arena • Minneapolis, MN	Grogan	W 2–1	876	6–2–1 (5–1–1)
November 1	7:07	at St. Cloud State	#2	Herb Brooks National Hockey Center • St. Cloud, MN	Lura	W 6–2	721	7–2–1 (6–1–1)
November 14	7:07	at Bemidji State	#2	John S. Glas Field House • Bemidji, MN	Grogan	W 3–0	561	8–2–1 (7–1–1)
November 15	2:07	at Bemidji State	#2	John S. Glas Field House • Bemidji, MN	Hanlon	W 7–0	324	9–2–1 (8–1–1)
November 21	7:07	Minnesota State	#2	Ridder Arena • Minneapolis, MN	Grogan	W 2–1	1,099	10–2–1 (9–1–1)
November 22	4:07	Minnesota State	#2	Ridder Arena • Minneapolis, MN	Lura	W 6–3	1,151	11–2–1 (10–1–1)
November 28	6:07	#9 Harvard*	#2	Ridder Arena • Minneapolis, MN	Grogan	W 3–1	1,226	12–2–1 (10–1–1)
November 29	4:07	#9 Harvard*	#2	Ridder Arena • Minneapolis, MN	Lura	W 3–2	1,216	13–2–1 (10–1–1)
December 5	7:07	at North Dakota	#2	Ralph Engelstad Arena • Grand Forks, ND	Grogan	W 4–0	1,520	14–2–1 (11–1–1)
December 6	4:07	at North Dakota	#2	Ralph Engelstad Arena • Grand Forks, ND	Lura	W 5–2	1,100	15–2–1 (12–1–1)
January 3	2:05	at Niagara*	#2	Dwyer Arena • Niagara, NY	Grogan	W 8–0	248	16–2–1 (12–1–1)
January 4	1:05	at Niagara*	#2	Dwyer Arena • Niagara, NY	Hanlon	W 5–3	255	17–2–1 (12–1–1)
January 9	7:07	at Ohio State	#2	Ohio State University Ice Rink • Columbus, OH	Grogan	W 9–2	238	18–2–1 (13–1–1)
January 10	4:07	at Ohio State	#2	Ohio State University Ice Rink • Columbus, OH	Lura	W 12–1	352	19–2–1 (14–1–1)
January 16	6:07	Bemidji State	#1	Ridder Arena • Minneapolis, MN	Lura	W 5–1	1,039	20–2–1 (15–1–1)
January 17	4:07	Bemidji State	#1	Ridder Arena • Minneapolis, MN	Lura	W 11–1	1,352	21–2–1 (16–1–1)
January 23	7:07	#3 Minnesota Duluth	#1	Ridder Arena • Minneapolis, MN	Grogan	L 2–4	1,754	21–3–1 (16–2–1)
January 24	5:07	#3 Minnesota Duluth	#1	Ridder Arena • Minneapolis, MN	Lura	T 3–3 ^{OT}	2,013	21–3–2 (16–2–2)
January 30	7:07	at Minnesota State	#2	Verizon Wireless Center • Mankato, MN	Grogan	W 9–1	467	22–3–2 (17–2–2)
January 31	3:07	at Minnesota State	#2	Verizon Wireless Center • Mankato, MN	Lura	W 7–4	537	23–3–2 (18–2–2)
February 7	2:07	#1 Wisconsin	#2	Ridder Arena • Minneapolis, MN	Grogan	W 4–2	2,562	24–3–2 (19–2–2)
February 8	2:07	#1 Wisconsin	#2	Ridder Arena • Minneapolis, MN	Grogan	T 3–3 ^{OT}	2,895	24–3–3 (19–2–3)
February 13	6:07	North Dakota	#1	Ridder Arena • Minneapolis, MN	Grogan	W 4–1	1,119	25–3–3 (20–2–3)
February 14	4:07	North Dakota	#1	Ridder Arena • Minneapolis, MN	Lura	W 5–0	1,364	26–3–3 (21–2–3)
February 20	7:07	at St. Cloud State	#1	Herb Brooks National Hockey Center • St. Cloud, MN	Grogan	W 7–0	714	27–3–3 (22–2–3)
February 21	7:07	St. Cloud State	#1	Ridder Arena • Minneapolis, MN	Lura	W 3–1	2,068	28–3–3 (23–2–3)
WCHA Tournament
February 27	6:07	Bemidji State*	#1	Ridder Arena • Minneapolis, MN (WCHA First Round, Game 1)	Grogan	W 4–1	724	29–3–3 (23–2–3)
February 28	4:07	Bemidji State*	#1	Ridder Arena • Minneapolis, MN (WCHA First Round, Game 2)	Lura	W 5–1	808	30–3–3 (23–2–3)
March 7	1:07	Minnesota State*	#1	Ridder Arena • Minneapolis, MN (WCHA Final Faceoff, Semifinal)	Grogan	W 7–2	–	31–3–3 (23–2–3)
March 8	1:07	#2 Wisconsin*	#1	Ridder Arena • Minneapolis, MN (WCHA Final Faceoff, Final)	Grogan	L 3–5	1,730	31–4–3 (23–2–3)
NCAA Tournament
March 14	4:00	#7 Boston College*	#2	Ridder Arena • Minneapolis, MN (NCAA Tournament, First Round)	Grogan	W 4–3	1,530	32–4–3 (23–2–3)
March 20	8:05	vs. #3 Mercyhurst*	#2	Agganis Arena • Boston, MA (NCAA Frozen Four, Semifinal)	Lura	L 4–5	2,706	32–5–3 (23–2–3)
*Non-conference game. ^{#}Rankings from USCHO.com Poll.

=== News and notes ===
- Kelli Blankenship was in her junior season and appeared in all 40 games. She scored six goals and 10 assists for 16 points and had three multiple-point games in the season. Her first two points of the season were earned in an 8–2 win over Ohio State on October 18. She set up Gigi Marvin’s game-winning goal over St. Cloud State on October 31. She tied a career-best with three points in one game in a victory over Bemidji State on November 15. On November 28, she scored the game-winning goal in the 3–1 win over Harvard. In a 12–1 win over Ohio State (on January 10), she tied a career-high with two goals, including her first short-handed goal of her career.
- Rachael Drazan was in her senior season and played in 34 games, missing six to an injury. She ranked tenth on the team in scoring and third by defensemen (five goals and 16 assists for 21 points). She had a plus/minus rating of +22. On October 10, she set up Gigi Marvin’s power-play goal against Minnesota Duluth. The following week, she scored her first goal of the season and multiple-point game of the season in an 8–2 win over Ohio State on October 18. On January 31, she established a career-high in assists (3) and points (4) in a game in the 7–4 win over MSU Mankato.
- Melanie Gagnon was in her senior season and she was the senior co-captain with Gigi Marvin. Gagnon would finish her Golden Gophers career with 81 career points. Her 81 career points ranks fourth in school history by a defenseman. During the season, she led all blueliners in points with 29 (4 goals, 25 assists). Her plus/minus rating was +33. In addition, she was a member of the Gopher power play and penalty kill units. On the power play, she accumulated 12 points. All four of her goals came during the power play. She scored a game-winning, overtime goal against Minnesota Duluth on October 10. Gagnon ranked second in the WCHA and ninth nationally in points by a defenseman, averaging 0.72 points per game.

In an October 17 victory over Ohio State, she tallied two assists in the 8–1 win. She also notched two assists on November 21 against Minnesota State. On February 7, she scored a power-play goal against Wisconsin in a 4–2 win. She competed at the NCAA Skills Challenge with fellow Gopher men's senior Justin Bostrom.

- Jenny Lura was in her sophomore season and played in 20 games while starting in 17. Her goals against average was 1.62, ranking fourth nationally, and against conference teams, her GAA was 1.64, ranking fourth in the WCHA. In nine games, Lura kept her opponents to zero or one goal. On January 11, she earned her first shutout of the season. Her only loss of the season came on October 26, in a 2–1 defeat to Wisconsin. During the season, Lura held an eight-game win streak and unbeaten in her last 12 games.
- Gigi Marvin was in her senior season and finished her career with 195 points in 152 games, ranking sixth in school history in points, goals (87) and assists (108). She was the senior co-captain with Melanie Gagnon and played in 38 games, missing two due to an injury. Marvin ranked third on the team in scoring with 57 points and led the team with 21 power-play points, while ranking third on the team with 27 assists. In the Conference, she tied for fourth in the conference in goals scored (20) and eighth in points scored (34), while ranking 10th nationally in goals per game (0.79).
  - Marvin tallied three points in the 4–3 overtime win over Minnesota Duluth (October 10). She netted three goals in the series sweep over St. Cloud State to earn her first WCHA Offensive Player of the Week Honors. Her second conference honor was received when she scored four goals en route to a sweep over North Dakota (December 5–6). In a 5–2 win over North Dakota, she recorded her first career hat trick. The first series of the second half of the season was notable for Marvin. She had a career-high six points in one game while accumulating eight total points in the series sweep over Niagara (January 3–4). On January 9, she had three points in a 9–2 win over. She scored a goal and three assists in the 9–1 win over Minnesota State on January 30. In the series sweep over North Dakota from February 13–14, she had a goal and two assists in the series sweep over North Dakota. In the St. Cloud State Series, which was played from February 20–21, she added three goals and an assist. It was in the St. Cloud State Series that the Gophers clinched the WCHA regular season championship.
- As a freshman in 2008–09, Jocelyne Lamoureux she finished second on the team and fourth in the nation with 65 points (28 goals, 37 assists). The Gophers appeared in the NCAA Women's Frozen Four. At season’s end, she was earned All-WCHA First Team and All-WCHA Rookie Team honors.
- In 2008–09, Monique Lamoureux was a freshman for the Gophers but was the team’s third leading goal scorer, and a second team All-America selection. By mid-February 2009, Monique was leading the nation with 64 points on 32 assists and 32 goals. By season’ end, she ranked third in the NCAA and first among rookies with 75 points in 40 games (39 goals, 36 assists). She ranked second in the nation with five shorthanded goals and tied for third with eight game-winners. She participated in her first Frozen Four that season. In addition, she was the WCHA scoring champion, and WCHA Rookie of the Year. She was the only freshman to be named a top-10 finalist for Patty Kazmaier Memorial Award.
- Dagney Willey was in her senior season and appeared in 33 games. Although she had a goal and 10 assists on the season, she had a plus/minus season of +33. She tied a career-high with two assists in the January 10 win against Ohio State. On January 17, against Bemidji State, she added another two-assists.

=== Roster ===
No.	Nat.	Player	Class	Pos	Height	DoB	Hometown	Previous team
1		Jenny Lura	Sophomore	G	5' 8" (1.73 m)	1989-09-07	North Vancouver, British Columbia	Sentinel Secondary School
2		Kelly Seeler	Freshman	D	5' 6" (1.68 m)	1990-05-18	Eden Prairie, Minnesota	Eden Prairie High School
3		Melanie Gagnon	Senior	D	5' 5" (1.65 m)	1986-06-11	St. Adolphe, Manitoba	St. Norbert Collegiate High School
4		Sarah Erickson	Freshman	F	5' 6" (1.68 m)	1990-03-28	Roseau, Minnesota	Bemidji High School
5		Laura May	Sophomore	F	5' 8" (1.73 m)	1989-08-05	Dellwood, Minnesota	Mahtomedi High School
6		Rachael Drazan	Senior	D	5' 6" (1.68 m)	1986-01-11	Orono, Minnesota	Benilde-St. Margaret's
7		Kelli Blankenship	Junior	F	5' 6" (1.68 m)	1987-06-23	Lusby, Maryland	North American Hockey Academy
9		Jaimie Horton	Junior	F	5' 7" (1.7 m)	1988-04-24	Maple Grove, Minnesota	Maple Grove High School
10		Brittany Francis	Junior	F	5' 7" (1.7 m)	1987-12-02	Thunder Bay, Ontario	Toronto Jr. Aeros
12		Jocelyne Lamoureux	Freshman	F	5' 6" (1.68 m)	1989-07-03	Grand Forks, North Dakota	Shattuck-Saint Mary's
14		Chelsey Jones	Junior	F	5' 8" (1.73 m)	1988-01-28	Lake Elmo, Minnesota	Stillwater Area High School
17		Emily West	Sophomore	F	5' 5" (1.65 m)	1989-03-22	Colorado Springs, Colorado	Pine Creek High School
18		Nikki Ludwigson	Freshman	F	5' 7" (1.7 m)	1989-09-18	Bloomington, Minnesota	Eden Prairie High School
19		Gigi Marvin	Senior	F	5' 8" (1.73 m)	1987-03-07	Warroad, Minnesota	Warroad High School
20		Alexandra Zebro	Sophomore	D	6' 0" (1.83 m)	1988-06-16	Oak Grove, Minnesota	Faithful Family Academy
21		Monique Lamoureux	Freshman	F	5' 6" (1.68 m)	1989-07-03	Grand Forks, North Dakota	Shattuck-Saint Mary's
22		Anne Schleper	Freshman	D	5' 10" (1.78 m)	1990-01-30	St. Cloud, Minnesota	Cathedral High School
23		Dagney Willey	Senior	D	5' 5" (1.65 m)		Maple Grove, Minnesota	Osseo Senior High School
24		Jen Schoullis	Sophomore	F	5' 9" (1.75 m)	1989-03-07	Erie, Pennsylvania	Shattuck-Saint Mary's
25		Terra Rasmussen	Sophomore	F	5' 7" (1.7 m)	1988-09-04	Coon Rapids, Minnesota	Coon Rapids High School
26		Michelle Maunu	Junior	D	5' 6" (1.68 m)	1987-07-15	Esko, Minnesota	Esko High School
31		Alyssa Grogan	Freshman	G	5' 6" (1.68 m)	1990-05-15	Eagan, Minnesota	Eagan High School
39		Kim Hanlon	Senior	G	5' 6" (1.68 m)		Blaine, Minnesota	Blaine High School

== Playoffs ==
- February 27: Dagney Willey logged the second assist in the game-winning goal against Bemidji State in the first round of the WCHA playoffs.
- During the WCHA FINAL FACEOFF, Rachel Drazan tallied a power-play assist in the 7–2 win over Minnesota State. In the win, Kelli Blankenship added an assist.
- March 8, Willey netted her first goal since her sophomore year, in the WCHA championship game against Wisconsin.
- March 14: Gigi Marvin scored two of the Gophers’ four goals in the NCAA quarterfinal win over Boston College. She scored just 46 seconds into the BC contest and followed with another goal at 3:15 to give Minnesota a quick two-goal lead. Drazan scored an unassisted goal in the 4–3 win over Boston College during the NCAA quarterfinal game. Melanie Gagnon tallied two assists, including one on the power play, in the game.
- Marvin was part of all four of the Gophers' goals in the loss against Mercyhurst in the NCAA Frozen Four. Against Mercyhurst, Drazan set up two goals in the NCAA semifinal game to close out her college career.
- In the postseason, Jenny Lura stopped 22 of 23 St. Cloud State shots in a 3–1 win to clinch the WCHA regular season championship and saw action in the NCAA semifinal game against Mercyhurst.

== Awards and honors ==
- Kelli Blankenship, All-WCHA Academic Team member
- Rachel Drazan, All-WCHA Academic Team member
- Rachel Drazan, Second-Team All-WCHA
- Rachel Drazan, Hockey Humanitarian Award nominee
- Melanie Gagnon, WCHA Defensive Player of the Year
- Melanie Gagnon, Second-Team All-American
- Melanie Gagnon, All-WCHA First Team selection
- Melanie Gagnon, All-WCHA Academic Team member
- Melanie Gagnon, WCHA All-Tournament Team selection
- Melanie Gagnon, Patty Kazmaier nominee
- Jocelyne Lamoureux, All-WCHA First Team, 2009
- Jocelyne Lamoureux, WCHA All-Rookie Team, 2009
- Monique Lamoureux, All-WCHA First Team, 2009
- Monique Lamoureux, Patty Kazmaier Award, Top 10 Finalist
- Monique Lamoureux, Second Team All-America selection
- Monique Lamoureux, WCHA All-Rookie Team
- Monique Lamoureux, WCHA Rookie of the Year selection
- Monique Lamoureux, WCHA scoring champion
- Jenny Lura, US College Hockey Online Defensive Player of the Week, (Week of January 12)
- Gigi Marvin, All-WCHA Academic Team honoree
- Gigi Marvin, All-WCHA Second-Team
- Gigi Marvin, Patty Kazmaier Award top-10 finalist
- Gigi Marvin, WCHA Outstanding Student-Athlete of the Year, Minnesota’s first honor since 2000
- Gigi Marvin, WCHA Scholar Athlete
- Gigi Marvin, Team's most valuable player
- Anne Schleper, WCHA All-Rookie Team
- Dagney Willey, Earned the team's Ridder Award for the third time of her career (given to the team's student-athlete that does the most within the community)
- Dagney Willey, All-WCHA Academic Team honoree
