= 2024–25 Ohio State Buckeyes women's ice hockey season =

NCAA Tournament, Runner-Up
- Conference: WCHA
- Home ice: The Ohio State University Ice Rink

Rankings
- USCHO: No. 2
- USA Hockey: No. 2

Record
- Overall: 29–8–3
- Home: 16–3–1
- Road: 12–3–1
- Neutral: 1–2–1

Coaches and captains
- Head coach: Nadine Muzerall
- Assistant coaches: Peter Elander; Kelsey Cline
- Captain: Jenna Buglioni

The 2024–25 Ohio State Buckeyes women's ice hockey season represented the Ohio State University during 2024–25 NCAA Division I women's ice hockey season. They were coached by Nadine Muzerall in her ninth season. The Buckeyes lost to Wisconsin 3–4 in overtime of the 2025 NCAA Division I women's ice hockey tournament championship game.

== Offseason ==
=== Departing players ===
Player	Position	Class	Destintation
Cayla Barnes	D	Montreal Victoire	
Lauren Bernard	D	Toronto Sceptres	
Hannah Bilka	F	Boston Fleet	
Delaney Fleming	F	Sophomore	Cornell
Jennifer Gardiner	F	Montreal Victoire	
Hadley Hartmetz	D	Boston Fleet	
Kenzie Hauswirth	F	Graduated	
Kelsey King	F	Graduated	
Raygan Kirk	G	Toronto Sceptres	
Stephanie Markowski	D	Ottawa Charge	
Olivia Mobley	F	Graduate	Minnesota Duluth
Quinn Kuntz	G	Graduate	Wisconsin

=== Players Drafted ===
Professional Women's Hockey League
Round	Player	Position	Team
1	Hannah Bilka	F	Boston Fleet
1	Cayla Barnes	D	Montreal Victoire
2	Jennifer Gardiner	F	Montreal Victoire
4	Gabby Rosenthal	F	New York Sirens
4	Stephanie Markowski	D	Ottawa Charge
4	Lauren Bernard	D	Toronto Sceptres
7	Hadley Hartmetz	D	Boston Fleet
7	Raygan Kirk	G	Toronto Sceptres

=== Incoming players ===
Player	Position	Class	Previous school
Brooke Disher	D	Junior	Boston University
Mira Jungåker	D	Incoming freshman	
Genny Klein	G	Incoming freshman	
Hailey MacLeod	G	Junior	Minnesota Duluth
Grace McCoshen	D	Incoming freshman	
Jordyn Petrie	F	Incoming freshman	
Maria Roth	D	Incoming freshman	
Josie St. Martin	F	Incoming freshman	
Sara Swiderski	D	Junior	Clarkson
Maddi Wheeler	F	Graduate	Wisconsin
Emily Zumwinkle	D	Senior	Minnesota

== Standings ==
2024–25 Western Collegiate Hockey Association standings
	Conference										Overall					
	GP	W	L	T	OTW	OTL	SOW	PTS	GF	GA	GP	W	L	T	GF	GA
#1 Wisconsin†*	28	25	1	2	1	0	1	77	137	35	41	38	1	2	221	48
#2 Ohio State	28	19	6	3	3	0	2	59	95	58	40	29	8	3	155	83
#4 Minnesota	28	19	8	1	1	0	0	57	95	69	42	29	12	1	153	104
#6 Minnesota Duluth	28	14	12	2	0	2	2	48	76	53	39	22	15	2	114	70
#11 St. Cloud State	28	10	13	5	1	1	1	36	53	71	36	15	15	6	74	82
Minnesota State	28	7	19	2	0	4	1	28	70	97	37	14	21	2	105	118
St. Thomas	28	6	21	1	2	2	1	20	47	116	36	9	25	2	73	140
Bemidji State	28	4	24	0	1	0	0	11	34	108	37	6	30	1	56	148
Championship: March 8, 2025 † indicates conference regular season champion; * indicates conference tournament champion Rankings: USCHO.com; updated March 23, 2025

== Schedule and results ==
Date	Time	Opponent^{#}	Rank^{#}	Site	Decision	Result	Attendance	Record
Regular Season
September 21	3:00 p.m.	#7 Minnesota Duluth	#1	Ohio State University Ice Rink • Columbus, Ohio	Thiele	L 1–2	537	0–1–0 (0–1–0)
September 22	1:00 p.m.	#7 Minnesota Duluth	#1	Ohio State University Ice Rink • Columbus, Ohio	MacLeod	L 3-4	530	0–2–0 (0–2–0)
September 27	7:00 p.m.	at Bemidji State	#5	Sanford Center • Bemidji, Minnesota	Thiele	W 8–2	371	1–2–0 (1–2–0)
September 28	4:00 p.m.	at Bemidji State	#5	Sanford Center • Bemidji, Minnesota	MacLeod	W 3–0	317	2–2–0 (2–2–0)
October 4	6:00 p.m.	at St. Lawrence	#5	Appleton Arena • Canton, New York	Thiele	W 3-2 ^{OT}	916	3–2–0 (2–2–0)
October 5	3:00 p.m.	at St. Lawrence	#5	Appleton Arena • Canton, New York	MacLeod	W 5–3	617	4–2–0 (2–2–0)
October 11	6:00 p.m.	#2 Minnesota	#4	Ohio State University Ice Rink • Columbus, Ohio	Thiele	W 4–3	642	5–2–0 (3–2–0)
October 12	3:00 p.m.	#2 Minnesota	#4	Ohio State University Ice Rink • Columbus, Ohio	Thiele	T 1–1 ^{SOW}	763	5–2–1 (3–2–1)
October 18	7:00 p.m.	at #11 St. Cloud State	#2	Brooks Center • St. Cloud, Minnesota	Thiele	W 5–1	417	6–2–1 (4–2–1)
October 19	2:00 p.m.	at #11 St. Cloud State	#2	Brooks Center • St. Cloud, Minnesota	MacLeod	T 3–3 ^{SOL}	441	6–2–2 (4–2–2)
October 22	6:00 p.m.	Mercyhurst*	#2	Ohio State University Ice Rink • Columbus, Ohio	Thiele	W 5–1	412	7–2–2
October 25	3:00 p.m.	Stonehill*	#2	Value City Arena • Columbus, Ohio (Women's Icebreaker Tournament Semifinal)	Secreto	W 11–0	623	8–2–2
October 26	4:00 p.m.	Cornell*	#2	Value City Arena • Columbus, Ohio (Women's Icebreaker Tournament Championship Game)	Thiele	W 5–1	483	9–2–2
November 1	3:00 p.m.	at St. Thomas	#2	St. Thomas Ice Arena • St. Paul, Minnesota	Thiele	W	249	10–2–2 (5–2–2)
November 2	2:00 p.m.	at St. Thomas	#2	St. Thomas Ice Arena • St. Paul, Minnesota	MacLeod	W 1–0 ^{OT}	356	11–2–2 (6–2–2)
November 15	6:00 p.m.	#1 Wisconsin	#2	Ohio State University Ice Rink • Columbus, Ohio	Thiele	L 2–4	784	11–3–2 (6–3–2)
November 16	3:00 p.m.	#1 Wisconsin	#2	Ohio State University Ice Rink • Columbus, Ohio	Thiele	W 3–2	807	12–3–2 (7–3–2)
November 22	7:00 p.m.	at Minnesota State	#2	Mayo Clinic Health System Event Center • Mankato, Minnesota	MacLeod	W 2–1	297	13–3–2 (8–3–2)
November 23	2:00 p.m.	at Minnesota State	#2	Mayo Clinic Health System Event Center • Mankato, Minnesota	Thiele	L 1–4	313	13–4–2 (8–4–2)
January 2	8:00 p.m.	at #1 Wisconsin	#2	LaBahn Arena • Madison, Wisconsin	Thiele	L 0–6	2,273	13–5–2 (8–5–2)
January 4	5:30 p.m.	vs. #1 Wisconsin	#2	Wrigley Field • Chicago, Illinois (Frozen Confines)	Thiele	T 3–3 ^{SOW}	25,709	13–5–3 (8–5–3)
January 10	6:00 p.m.	Benidji State	#2	Ohio State University Ice Rink • Columbus, Ohio	Thiele	W 6–0	425	14–5–3 (9–5–3)
January 11	3:00 p.m.	Bemidji State	#2	Ohio State University Ice Rink • Columbus, Ohio	MacLeod	W 4–0	807	15–5–3 (10–5–3)
January 17	7:00 p.m.	at #4 Minnesota Duluth	#2	AMSOIL Arena • Duluth, Minnesota	Thiele	W 3–1	1,019	16–5–3 (11–5–3)
January 18	4:00 p.m.	at #4 Minneosta Duluth	#2	AMSOIL Arena • Duluth, Minnesota	Thiele	W 2–1	1,205	17–5–3 (12–5–3)
January 21	4:00 p.m.	at Mercyhurst*	#2	Mercyhurst Ice Center • Erie, Pennsylvania	MacLeod	W 5–1	487	18–5–3
January 24	6:00 p.m.	Minneosta State	#2	Ohio State University Ice Rink • Columbus, Ohio	Thiele	W 5–2	716	19–5–3 (13–5–3)
January 25	3:00 p.m.	Minnesota State	#2	Ohio State University Ice Rink • Columbus, Ohio	MacLeod	W 4–1	TBA	20–5–3 (14–5–3)
January 31	7:00 p.m.	at #3 Minnesota	#2	Ridder Arena • Minneapolis, Minnesota	Thiele	L 1–3	1,943	20–6–3 (14–6–3)
February 1	3:00 p.m.	at #3 Minnesota	#2	Ridder Arena • Minneapolis, Minnesota	Thiele	W 7–3	2,487	21–6–3 (15–6–3)
February 7	6:00 p.m.	St. Thomas	#2	Ohio State University Ice Rink • Columbus, Ohio	Thiele	W 5–4	711	22–6–3 (16–6–3)
February 8	1:00 p.m.	St. Thomas	#2	Ohio State University Ice Rink • Columbus, Ohio	MacLeod	W 5–1	718	23–6–3 (17–6–3)
February 21	6:00 p.m.	St. Cloud State	#2	Ohio State University Ice Rink • Columbus, Ohio	Thiele	W 5–3	728	24–6–3 (18–6–3)
February 22	3:00 p.m.	St. Cloud State	#2	Ohio State University Ice Rink • Columbus, Ohio	Thiele	W 3–2	720	25–6–3 (19–6–3)
WCHA Tournament
February 28	6:00 p.m.	St. Thomas	#2	Ohio State University Ice Rink • Columbus, Ohio (WCHA Round 1)	Thiele	W 5–1	555	26–6–3
March 1	3:00 p.m.	St. Thomas	#2	Ohio State University Ice Rink • Columbus, Ohio (WCHA Round 1)	Thiele	W 4–1	434	27–6–3
March 7	5:30 p.m.	vs. #4 Minnesota	#2	AMSOIL Arena • Duluth, Minnesota (WCHA Semifinals)	Thiele	L 2–6	1,762	27–7–3
NCAA Tournament
March 15	6:00 p.m.	St. Lawrence*	#2	Ohio State University Ice Rink • Columbus, Ohio (NCAA Regional Final)	Thiele	W 6–1	711	28–7–3
March 21	4:00 p.m.	vs. #3 Cornell*	#2	Ridder Arena • Minneapolis, MN (NCAA Frozen Four)	Thiele	W 4–2	TBA	29–7–3
March 23	4:00 p.m.	vs. #1 Wisconsin	#2	Ridder Arena • Minneapolis, MN (NCAA National Championship)	Thiele	L 3–4 ^{OT}	2,575	29–8–3
*Non-conference game. ^{#}Rankings from USCHO.com Poll. All times are in Eastern Time. Source:

== Rankings ==
Poll	Week																						
Poll	Pre	1	2	3	4	5	6	7	8	9	10	11	12	13	14	15	16	17	18	19	20	21	22 (Final)
USCHO	1 (14)	4 (1)	4	2	2	2	2	2	2	2	2	2	2	2	2	2	2	2	2	2	2	2	2
USA Hockey	2 (10)	5	5	1	2	2	2	2	2	2	2	2	2	2	2	2	2	2	2	2	2	2	2
