= 2024–25 Minnesota Golden Gophers women's ice hockey season =

Frozen Four Semifinalist, L 2–6 vs. Wisconsin
- Conference: WCHA
- Home ice: Ridder Arena

Rankings
- USCHO.com: 4
- USA Hockey: 4

Record
- Overall: 29–12–1
- Conference: 19–8–1
- Home: 15–6–0
- Road: 11–4–1
- Neutral: 3–2–0

Coaches and captains
- Head coach: Brad Frost (18th season)
- Assistant coaches: Greg May; Jessica Scott; Mitch Baker
- Captain(s): Peyton Hemp; Abbey Murphy; Ella Huber; Nelli Laitinen

The 2024–25 Minnesota Golden Gophers women's ice hockey season represented the University of Minnesota during the 2024–25 NCAA Division I women's ice hockey season.

== Offseason ==
=== Departing players ===
Players who left the Gophers after last season
Player	Position	Class	Destination
Taylor Stewart	Defender	Graduated	
Madeline Wethington	Defender	Graduated	Ottawa Charge
Josie Hemp	Defender	Sophomore	Vermont
Sadie Lindsay	Forward	Senior	St. Thomas
Emily Zumwinkle	Defender	Senior	Ohio State
Isa Goettl	Forward	Sophomore	Bemidji State
Josey Dunne	Forward	Graduate	Lindenwood
Tristana Tatur	Forward	Senior	Mercyhurst
Solveig Neunzert	Defender	Graduated	
Lucy Morgan	Goaltender	Graduated	

=== Players drafted ===
Professional Women's Hockey League
Round	Player	Position	Team
7	Madeline Wethington	D	Ottawa Charge

=== Recruiting ===
Players who joined the Gophers since last season
Player	Position	Nationality	Notes
Krista Parkkonen	Defender	Finland	Transfer from Vermont
Natálie Mlýnková	Forward	Czech Republic	Transfer from Vermont
Chloe Primerano	Defender	Canada	RINK Kelowna
Gracie Graham	Defender	Canada	RINK Kelowna
Kendra Distad	Forward	United States	Minnetonka High School
Ayla Puppe	Forward	United States	Northfield High School
Hannah Clark	Goaltender	Canada	Etobicoke Dolphins
Carly Humphrey	Defender	United States	
Kate Kosobud	Defender	United States	
Sydney Morrow	Defender	United States	Transfer from Colgate

== Roster ==
No.	Nat.	Player	Class	Pos	Height	DoB	Hometown	Previous team
4		Audrey Wethington	Graduate	F	5' 7" (1.7 m)	2002-04-01	Edina, Minnesota	Blake School
5		Kate Kosobud	Freshman	D	5' 8" (1.73 m)	2006-06-12	Moorhead, Minnesota	Moorhead High School
6		Ayla Puppe	Freshman	F	5' 8" (1.73 m)	2006-05-29	Northfield, Minnesota	Northfield High School
7		Nelli Laitinen (C)	Junior	D	5' 7" (1.7 m)	2002-04-29	Lohja, Finland	Kiekko-Espoo
8		Chloe Primerano	Freshman	D	5' 8" (1.73 m)	2007-01-02	Kelowna, British Columbia	RINK-Kelowna
9		Ava Lindsay	Sophomore	F	5' 6" (1.68 m)	2005-02-20	Minnetonka, Minnesota	Minnetonka High School
11		Josefin Bouveng	Junior	F	5' 9" (1.75 m)	2001-05-15	Vassunda, Sweden	Brynäs IF
13		Emma Kreisz	Sophomore	F	5' 9" (1.75 m)	2003-09-02	Budapest, Hungary	Stanstead College
14		Maggie Nicholson	Graduate	D	5' 9" (1.75 m)	2002-03-21	Minnetonka, Minnesota	Minnetonka High School
15		Peyton Hemp (C)	Senior	F	5' 5" (1.65 m)	2003-05-15	Andover, Minnesota	Andover High School
16		Allie Franco	Junior	D	5' 7" (1.7 m)	2004-01-27	Oakdale, Minnesota	Hill-Murray School
17		Kendra Distad	Freshman	F	5' 7" (1.7 m)	2006-02-25	Burnsville, Minnesota	Minnetonka High School
18		Abbey Murphy (C)	Senior (RS)	F	5' 5" (1.65 m)	2002-04-14	Evergreen Park, Illinois	Chicago Mission
20		Emma Conner	Junior (RS)	F	5' 8" (1.73 m)	2002-10-01	Edina, Minnesota	Edina High School
21		Lauren O'Hara	Sophomore	F	5' 11" (1.8 m)	2005-03-02	Blaine, Minnesota	Centennial High School
22		Elly Klepinger	Sophomore	D	5' 9" (1.75 m)	2005-02-08	Corcoran, Minnesota	Minnetonka High School
24		Carly Humphrey	Freshman	D	5' 7" (1.7 m)	2006-03-03	Elk River, Minnesota	Elk River High School
26		Ella Huber (C)	Senior	F	5' 6" (1.68 m)	2002-12-18	Northfield, Illinois	Chicago Mission
29		Madison Kaiser	Junior	F	5' 7" (1.7 m)	2004-07-10	Ham Lake, Minnesota	Holy Family Catholic High School
31		Skylar Vetter	Senior	G	5' 8" (1.73 m)	2003-05-14	Lakeville, Minnesota	Lakeville North High School
32		Sydney Morrow	Junior	D	5' 7" (1.7 m)	2004-04-12	Darien, Connecticut	Shattuck-Saint Mary's
35		Sophia Johnson	Junior	G	5' 8" (1.73 m)	2004-04-16	Minnetonka, Minnesota	Minnetonka High School
47		Gracie Graham	Freshman	D	5' 10" (1.78 m)	2006-01-09	Kelowna, British Columbia	RINK-Kelowna
56		Hannah Clark	Freshman	G	5' 9" (1.75 m)	2006-05-12	Oshawa, Ontario	Etobicoke Dolphins
64		Krista Parkkonen	Junior	D	5' 6" (1.68 m)	2002-06-25	Lappeenranta, Finland	Vermont (Hockey East)
96		Natálie Mlýnková	Graduate	F	5' 3" (1.6 m)	2001-05-24	Zlín, Czech Republic	Vermont (Hockey East)

== Standings ==
2024–25 Western Collegiate Hockey Association standings
	Conference										Overall					
	GP	W	L	T	OTW	OTL	SOW	PTS	GF	GA	GP	W	L	T	GF	GA
#1 Wisconsin†*	28	25	1	2	1	0	1	77	137	35	41	38	1	2	221	48
#2 Ohio State	28	19	6	3	3	0	2	59	95	58	40	29	8	3	155	83
#4 Minnesota	28	19	8	1	1	0	0	57	95	69	42	29	12	1	153	104
#6 Minnesota Duluth	28	14	12	2	0	2	2	48	76	53	39	22	15	2	114	70
#11 St. Cloud State	28	10	13	5	1	1	1	36	53	71	36	15	15	6	74	82
Minnesota State	28	7	19	2	0	4	1	28	70	97	37	14	21	2	105	118
St. Thomas	28	6	21	1	2	2	1	20	47	116	36	9	25	2	73	140
Bemidji State	28	4	24	0	1	0	0	11	34	108	37	6	30	1	56	148
Championship: March 8, 2025 † indicates conference regular season champion; * indicates conference tournament champion Rankings: USCHO.com; updated March 23, 2025

== Regular season ==
=== Schedule ===
Date	Time	Opponent^{#}	Rank^{#}	Site	Decision	Result	Attendance	Record
Regular season
September 27	5:00	at #9 Connecticut*	#3	Toscano Family Ice Forum • Storrs, CT	Vetter	W 4–1	679	1–0–0
September 28	2:00	at #9 Connecticut*	#3	Toscano Family Ice Forum • Storrs, CT	Vetter	W 3–2 ^{OT}	476	2–0–0
October 4	6:00	Boston University*	#2	Ridder Arena • Minneapolis, MN	Vetter	W 1–0	1,031	3–0–0
October 6	1:00	Boston University*	#2	Ridder Arena • Minneapolis, MN	Clark	W 5–2	807	4–0–0
October 11	5:00	at #4 Ohio State	#2	Ohio State University Ice Rink • Columbus, OH	Vetter	L 3–4	642	4–1–0 (0–1–0)
October 12	2:00	at #4 Ohio State	#2	Ohio State University Ice Rink • Columbus, OH	Clark	T 1–1 ^{SOL}	763	4–1–1 (0–1–1)
October 18	6:00	#1 Wisconsin	#3	Ridder Arena • Minneapolis, MN	Vetter	L 0–5	3,139	4–2–1 (0–2–1)
October 19	3:00	#1 Wisconsin	#3	Ridder Arena • Minneapolis, MN	Clark	L 3–4	3,224	4–3–1 (0–3–1)
October 25	TBA	Minnesota State	#4	Ridder Arena • Minneapolis, MN	Clark	W 8–2	1,163	5–3–1 (1–3–1)
October 26	2:00	at Minnesota State	#4	Mayo Clinic Health System Event Center • Mankato, MN	Vetter	W 3–2 ^{OT}	427	6–3–1 (2–3–1)
November 1	3:00	at Bemidji State	#3	Sanford Center • Bemidji, MN	Clark	W 2–1	286	7–3–1 (3–3–1)
November 2	2:00	at Bemidji State	#3	Sanford Center • Bemidji, MN	Clark	W 4–1	305	8–3–1 (4–3–1)
November 15	6:00	at #4 Minnesota Duluth	#3	AMSOIL Arena • Duluth, MN	Clark	W 4–1	1,287	9–3–1 (5–3–1)
November 16	3:00	at #4 Minnesota Duluth	#3	AMSOIL Arena • Duluth, MN	Clark	W 3–2	1,578	10–3–1 (6–3–1)
November 22	6:00	#10 St. Cloud State	#3	Ridder Arena • Minneapolis, MN	Clark	W 5–2	3,165	11–3–1 (7–3–1)
November 23	3:00	at #10 St. Cloud State	#3	Herb Brooks National Hockey Center • St. Cloud, MN	Clark	L 1–3	x	11–4–1 (7–4–1)
December 6	7:00	at St. Thomas	#3	St. Thomas Ice Arena • Mendota Heights, MN	Clark	W 5–0	537	12–4–1 (8–4–1)
December 7	6:00	at St. Thomas	#3	St. Thomas Ice Arena • Mendota Heights, MN	Clark	W 6–2	579	13–4–1 (9–4–1)
January 1	5:00	vs. Bemidji State*		Lakeville Hasse Arena • Lakeville, MN (U.S. Hockey Hall of Fame Museum Women's Face-Off Classic)	Clark	W 4–1	1,457	14–4–1 (9–4–1)
January 3	4:30	Brown*	#3	Ridder Arena • Minneapolis, MN (East/West Showcase)	Clark	W 9–1	1,536	15–4–1 (9–4–1)
January 4	4:30	#12 Penn State*	#3	Ridder Arena • Minneapolis, MN (East/West Showcase)	Clark	L 2–6	2,485	15–5–1 (9–4–1)
January 10	6:00	St. Thomas	#3	Ridder Arena • Minneapolis, MN	Clark	W 4–2	1,847	16–5–1 (10–4–1)
January 11	2:00	St. Thomas	#3	Ridder Arena • Minneapolis, MN	Clark	W 5–1	2,192	17–5–1 (11–4–1)
January 17	6:00	Minnesota State	#3	Ridder Arena • Minneapolis, MN	Clark	W 8–3	1,642	18–5–1 (12–4–1)
January 18	2:00	at Minnesota State	#3	Mayo Clinic Health System Event Center • Mankato, MN	Clark	W 5–2	411	19–5–1 (13–4–1)
January 24	12:00	Bemidji State	#3	Ridder Arena • Minneapolis, MN	Clark	W 4–1	3,700	20–5–1 (14–4–1)
January 25	11:30	Bemidji State	#3	Valleyfair • Shakopee, MN (Hockey Day Minnesota)	Clark	W 3–1	100	21–5–1 (15–4–1)
January 31	6:00	#2 Ohio State	#3	Ridder Arena • Minneapolis, MN	Clark	W 3–1	1,943	22–5–1 (16–4–1)
February 1	2:00	#2 Ohio State	#3	Ridder Arena • Minneapolis, MN	Clark	L 3–7	2,487	22–6–1 (16–5–1)
February 8	2:00	at #1 Wisconsin	#3	LaBahn Arena • Madison, WI	Clark	L 2–8	2,273	22–7–1 (16–6–1)
February 9	12:00	at #1 Wisconsin	#3	LaBahn Arena • Madison, WI	Clark	L 1–6	2,273	22–8–1 (16–7–1)
February 14	6:00	#11 St. Cloud State	#3	Ridder Arena • Minneapolis, MN	Clark	L 3–4	1,490	22–9–1 (16–8–1)
February 15	3:00	at #11 St. Cloud State	#3	Herb Brooks National Hockey Center • St. Cloud, MN	Clark	W 2–1	702	23–9–1 (17–8–1)
February 21	6:00	#6 Minnesota Duluth	#4	Ridder Arena • Minneapolis, MN	Clark	W 3–2	2,160	24–9–1 (18–8–1)
February 22	2:00	#6 Minnesota Duluth	#4	Ridder Arena • Minneapolis, MN	Clark	W 1–0	2,232	25–9–1 (19–8–1)
*Non-conference game. ^{#}Rankings from USCHO.com Poll.

=== WCHA tournament ===
The Minnesota Golden Gophers women's ice hockey team earned the third seed in the 2025 WCHA tournament based on their 19–8–1 conference record, This seed earned them the right to play the sixth-seeded Minnesota State team at home in Ridder Arena in a best-of-three series to open the WCHA tournament. After winning two of three games in the first round, the Gophers moved on to the WCHA final faceoff at AMSOIL Arena in Duluth, Minnesota. In the semifinal, the Gophers beat the Ohio State Buckeyes, 6–2, advancing to the finals against Wisconsin. In the tournament finals, Wisconsin had the upper hand, besting the Gophers by a score of 4–3.

As of March 8, 2025

Date	Time	Opponent^{#}	Rank^{#}	Site	Decision	Result	Attendance	Record
WCHA Tournament
February 28	6:00	#6 Minnesota State*	#3	Ridder Arena • Minneapolis, MN (WCHA First Round, Game 1)	Clark	W 6–1	1,206	26–9–1
March 1	2:00	#6 Minnesota State*	#3	Ridder Arena • Minneapolis, MN (WCHA First Round, Game 2)	Clark	L 4–5 ^{2OT}	1,280	26–10–1
March 2	3:00	#6 Minnesota State*	#3	Ridder Arena • Minneapolis, MN (WCHA First Round, Game 3)	Clark	W 6–2	1,253	27–10–1
March 7	4:32	vs. #2 Ohio State*	#3	AMSOIL Arena • Duluth, MN (WCHA Final Faceoff, Semifinal Game)	Clark	W 6–2	1,762	28–10–1
March 8	2:00	vs. #1 Wisconsin*	#3	AMSOIL Arena • Duluth, MN (WCHA Final Faceoff, Championship Game)	Clark	L 3–4	1,715	28–11–1
*Non-conference game. ^{#}Rankings from USCHO.com Poll.

=== NCAA tournament ===
The Minnesota Golden Gophers had a 28–11–1 overall record through the regular season and WCHA tournament, and earned the fourth overall seed in the 2025 NCAA Division I women's ice hockey tournament. By virtue of holding the fourth seed, the Gophers did not need to play in the first round of the tournament; instead they advanced straight to the quarterfinals of the 11-team single-elimination tournament, hosting fifth-seeded Colgate at Ridder Arena on March 15, 2025. Minnesota bested the Colgate, 3–2, in that game, advancing to the women's Frozen Four, held the following weekend, also at Ridder Arena. Once again, the Gophers played their rival, and number one overall seed, Wisconsin Badgers in the semifinal round. Once again, Wisconsin beat the Gophers, this time by a 6–2 score, led by Laila Edwards' hat-trick.

As of March 23, 2025

Date	Time	Opponent^{#}	Rank^{#}	Site	Decision	Result	Attendance	Record
NCAA Tournament
March 15	2:00	#5 Colgate*	#4	Ridder Arena • Minneapolis, MN (NCAA Regional Final)	Clark	W 3–2	1,482	29–11–1
March 21	7:30	vs. #1 Wisconsin*	#4	Ridder Arena • Minneapolis, MN (NCAA Frozen Four)	Clark	L 2–6	3,487	29–12–1
*Non-conference game. ^{#}Rankings from USCHO.com Poll.

== Awards and honors ==
- Abbey Murphy was named WCHA Forward of the Week for the week of November 18, 2024.
- Hannah Clark was awarded with her first WCHA Goaltender of the week during the week of November 18, 2024.
- Abbey Murphy was awarded her second WCHA Forward of the Week this season on December 9, 2024.
- Also on December 9, the WCHA recognized Chloe Primerano with her first career WCHA Defender of the Week.
- On January 2, 2025, Abbey Murphy and Chloe Primerano were named WCHA Forward and Defender of the Month, respectively, for December.
- On January 3, 2025, Abbey Murphy was named the Hockey Commissioners Association National Player of the Month for December.
- On January 6, 2025, Sydney Morrow earned her first WCHA Defender of the Week this season.
- On January 13, 2025, Gracie Graham was named WCHA Defender of the Week for the first time this season.
- On January 20, 2025, Chloe Primerano picked up her first WCHA Rookie of the Week award for the season.
- On February 5, 2025, Abbey Murphy and Sydney Morrow were named WCHA Forward and Defender of the Month, respectively, for January.
- On February 6, 2025, Abbey Murphy was named the Hockey Commissioners Association National Player of the Month for January.
- Chloe Primerano was named the HCA Rookie of the Month for March 2025.
- Abbey Murphy earned her first All-American honor, being named as a Second Team All-American on March 22, 2025.
- On April 4, 2025, Abbey Murphy was named to the All-USCHO Second Team, and Chloe Primerano was named to the All-USCHO Rookie Team.

== Rankings ==
Poll	Week																									
Poll	Pre	1	2	3	4	5	6	7	8	9	10	11	12	13	14	15	16	17	18	19	20	21	22	23	24	Final
USCHO	3	2	2	3	4	3	3	3	3	3	3	3	3	3	3	3	3	3	4	4	4	4	–			4
USA Hockey	3	2	2	2	4	4	3	3	3	3	3	3	3	3	3	3	3	3	3	3	4	4	4	4	4	4

=== Notes ===
1. USCHO publishes Preseason, 21 weeks of in-season rankings, and a Final ranking.
2. USA Hockey publishes Preseason, 24 weeks of in-season rankings, and a Final ranking.
