= Hanne Sikiö =

Finnish ice hockey player

- Born: 19 March 1978 (age 48) Lempäälä, Pirkanmaa, Finland
- Height: 179 cm (5 ft 10 in)
- Weight: 69 kg (152 lb; 10 st 12 lb)
- Position: Forward
- Shot: Left
- Played for: Ilves Tampere; JYP Jyväskylä; Minnesota Duluth Bulldogs; Tappara Tampere; HPK Hämeenlinna
- National team: Finland
- Playing career: 1995–2008
Medal record
Representing Finland
Women's ice hockey
Bronze medal – third place	2000 Canada
Bronze medal – third place	1999 Finland

Hanne Erika Sikiö (born 19 March 1978) is a Finnish retired ice hockey player. She represented Finland in the women's ice hockey tournament at the 2002 Winter Olympics and at three IIHF Women's World Championship tournaments, winning bronze in 1999 and 2000.

Sikiö played four seasons with the Minnesota Duluth Bulldogs women's ice hockey program, from 1999 to 2003, making her one of the earliest Finns in North American collegiate women's ice hockey. Inducted into the UMD Athletics Hall of Fame, 9/26/25.

== Career stats ==
=== Minnesota Duluth Bulldogs ===
Year	GP	G	A	Pts
2002–2003	33	25	30	55
2001–2002	26	16	17	33
2000–2001	35	34	34	68
1999–2000	29	25	39	64
Career	123	100	120	220

=== Salt Lake 2002 ===
GP	G	A	Pts
5	2	0	2
