= Joel Johnson (ice hockey) =

American ice hockey coach (born 1974)

Biographical details
- Born: July 24, 1974 (age 52); Woodbury, Minnesota

Coaching career (HC unless noted)
- 2000–2004: Minnesota (Assistant)
- 2005–2006: Bethel (Assistant)
- 2007–2010: Bethel
- 2011–2014: Minnesota (Assistant)
- 2015–2021: Minnesota (Associate)
- 2022–2024: St. Thomas

Head coaching record
- Overall: 66–122–7

Joel Johnson (born July 24, 1974) is an American ice hockey coach. He is the former head coach for St. Thomas and for the United States women's national ice hockey team.

== Coaching career ==
=== Bethel University ===
Johnson served as the men's and women's soccer coach at Bethel University from 2004 to 2006. He also served as the soccer coach where he earned MIAC Coach of the Year honors. He served as the men's ice hockey head coach from 2007 to 2010. Along with his men's hockey responsibilities, he was also the men's golf coach and the inaugural women's golf coach. Johnson posted a career record of 38–34–3 in three seasons with Bethel.

=== University of Minnesota ===
Johnson served as the first assistant head coach at Minnesota in 2000. On June 14, 2010, Johnson resigned as head coach at Bethel to return to Minnesota as an assistant head coach. He served as assistant or associate head coach for 16 seasons. During his time with the team, the Gophers won six NCAA championships.

=== University of St. Thomas ===
On June 7, 2021, Johnson was named head coach of St. Thomas women's ice hockey team. On November 19, 2024, Johnson resigned as head coach at St. Thomas. In three and a half seasons with the Tommies he posted a record of 28–88–4.

=== Team USA ===
Johnson served as head coach of the United States women's national under-18 ice hockey team from 2015 to 2018, helping guide the team to four consecutive gold medals.

On March 1, 2019, Johnson was named an assistant coach for the United States women's national ice hockey team at 2019 IIHF Women's World Championship. On April 16, 2021, Johnson was named interim head coach for the United States women's national ice hockey team at the 2021 IIHF Women's World Championship.

On July 28, 2021, Johnson was named head coach for the United States women's ice hockey team at the 2022 Winter Olympics.

== Head coaching record ==
Record table
| Season | Team | Overall | Conference | Standing | Postseason |
|---|---|---|---|---|---|
Bethel University (MIAC) (2007–2010)
| 2007–08 | Bethel | 16–7–2 | 11–4–1 | 3rd | |
| 2008–09 | Bethel | 12–12–1 | 8–8–0 | 5th | |
| 2009–10 | Bethel | 10–15–0 | 8–8–0 | 6th | |
| Bethel: | | 38–34–3 | 27–20–1 | | |
St. Thomas (WCHA) (2021–2024)
| 2021–22 | St. Thomas | 5–27–1 | 3–23–1 | 8th | |
| 2022–23 | St. Thomas | 8–27–1 | 3–24–1 | 7th | |
| 2023–24 | St. Thomas | 10–26–1 | 4–23–1 | 7th | |
| 2024–25 | St. Thomas | 5–8–1 | 2–7–1 | 6th | |
| St. Thomas: | | 28–88–4 | 12–77–4 | | |
| Total: | | 66–122–7 | | | |
National champion Postseason invitational champion Conference regular season champion Conference regular season and conference tournament champion Division regular season champion Division regular season and conference tournament champion Conference tournament champion
