= 2001–02 Minnesota Duluth Bulldogs women's ice hockey season =

NCAA Frozen Four, National Champions
- Conference: WCHA

Record
- Overall: 24–6–4

Coaches and captains
- Head coach: Shannon Miller
- Assistant coaches: Stacy Wilson

== Preseason ==
- October 5–6, 2001: Bulldogs head coach Shannon Miller, forwards Erika Holst, Maria Rooth, Hanne Sikio and goaltender Tuula Puputti represented UMD in the first-ever WCHA All-Star Team. The team played two exhibition games against the U.S. National Team.

== Regular season ==
=== Standings ===
2001–02 Western Collegiate Hockey Association standings
	Conference								Overall					
	GP	W	L	T	SOW	PTS	GF	GA	GP	W	L	T	GF	GA
Minnesota†*	24	19	2	3	–	41	84	34	38	28	4	6	126	59
Minnesota Duluth	24	16	5	3	–	35	92	35	34	24	6	4	133	58
Wisconsin	24	17	6	1	–	35	76	36	35	22	11	2	110	51
Ohio State	24	9	12	3	–	21	53	59	37	18	15	4	90	91
Bemidji State	24	7	11	6	–	20	64	84	33	12	13	8	97	104
St. Cloud State	24	6	17	1	–	13	57	109	34	7	26	1	74	152
Minnesota State	24	1	22	1	–	3	26	95	32	4	26	2	38	110
Championship: † indicates conference regular season champion; * indicates conference tournament champion Updated July 20, 2024

- December 2: The 2001 National Champions were honored by the Minnesota Wild at the Xcel Energy Center.
- February 23: The Bulldogs had their 50th WCHA win in just their third year of WCHA competition.

== Player stats ==
Player	GP	G	A	Pts	GWG	PPG	SHG
Maria Rooth	30	22	16	38	5	3	1
Erika Holst	30	16	22	38	2	3	0
Hanne Sikio	26	16	17	33	1	7	0
Laurie Alexander	34	6	18	24	2	2	1
Tricia Guest	33	12	11	23	2	4	0
Joanne Eustace	32	14	8	22	3	4	0
Larissa Luther	34	11	9	20	1	4	1
Kristina Petrovskaia	31	5	13	18	0	0	0
Satu Kiipeli	32	3	12	15	2	1	0
Nora Tallus	28	6	7	13	1	1	0
Jessi Flink	34	5	8	13	0	1	0
Michelle McAteer	34	7	5	12	3	1	0
Navada Russell	34	4	8	12	1	1	1
Julianne Vasichek	34	1	11	12	0	0	0
Jenny Hempel	18	3	4	7	0	0	0
Shannon Mikel	25	1	1	2	1	0	0
Jessica Smith	26	0	2	2	0	0	0
Leah Kasper	21	1	0	1	0	0	0
Tuula Puputti	15	0	1	1	0	0	0
Julie Fearing	29	0	1	1	0	0	0
Heather Tudahl	8	0	0	0	0	0	0
Meghan Stotts	33	0	0	0	0	0	0
Patricia Sautter	22	0	0	0	0	0	0
Lisa Hagen	6	0	0	0	0	0	0

== International ==
- Seven Bulldogs traveled to Salt Lake City to compete in ice hockey at the 2002 Winter Olympics. Maria Rooth and Erika Holst played for bronze medal winner Sweden. Hanne Sikio and goaltender Tuula Puputti skated for fourth-place Finland and Kristina Petrovskaya finished fifth with Team Russia. The Bulldogs had two players in the Olympic gold medal game. Canadian Caroline Ouellette won the gold medal and American Jenny Potter won the silver medal.

== Awards and honors ==
- November 6: Patricia Sautter received the USCHO Defensive Player of the Week.
  - Sautter also received the WCHA Rookie of the Week honors. She helped the Bulldogs sweep the Wisconsin Badgers women's ice hockey program in an away series with 1–0 and 2–1 wins.
- November 26: Hanne Sikio received the Bulldogs first ever USCHO Offensive Player of the Week award.
  - In addition, Sikio received her second career WCHA Player of the Week honors.
- March 21: Maria Rooth, 2001–2002 All-American honors (It was the second consecutive year that she was selected as an All-American)

=== Postseason ===
- March 24: Joanne Eustace and defenseman Larissa Luther were selected to the 2002 NCAA All-Tournament Team
- April 2: The Bulldogs were honored for their athletic and academic achievements at the State Capitol, where resolutions were read, authorized by State Representative Tom Huntley and State Senator Yvonne Prettner-Solon.
- May 9: The Bulldogs were honored by the Regents of University of Minnesota and President Mark Yudof.
- May 16: Maria Rooth, Verizon Academic All-District At-Large second team.
- May 21: The two-time National Champions traveled to Washington D.C. to be honored by President George W. Bush for the second consecutive time.
