= Anna Kilponen =

Finnish ice hockey player

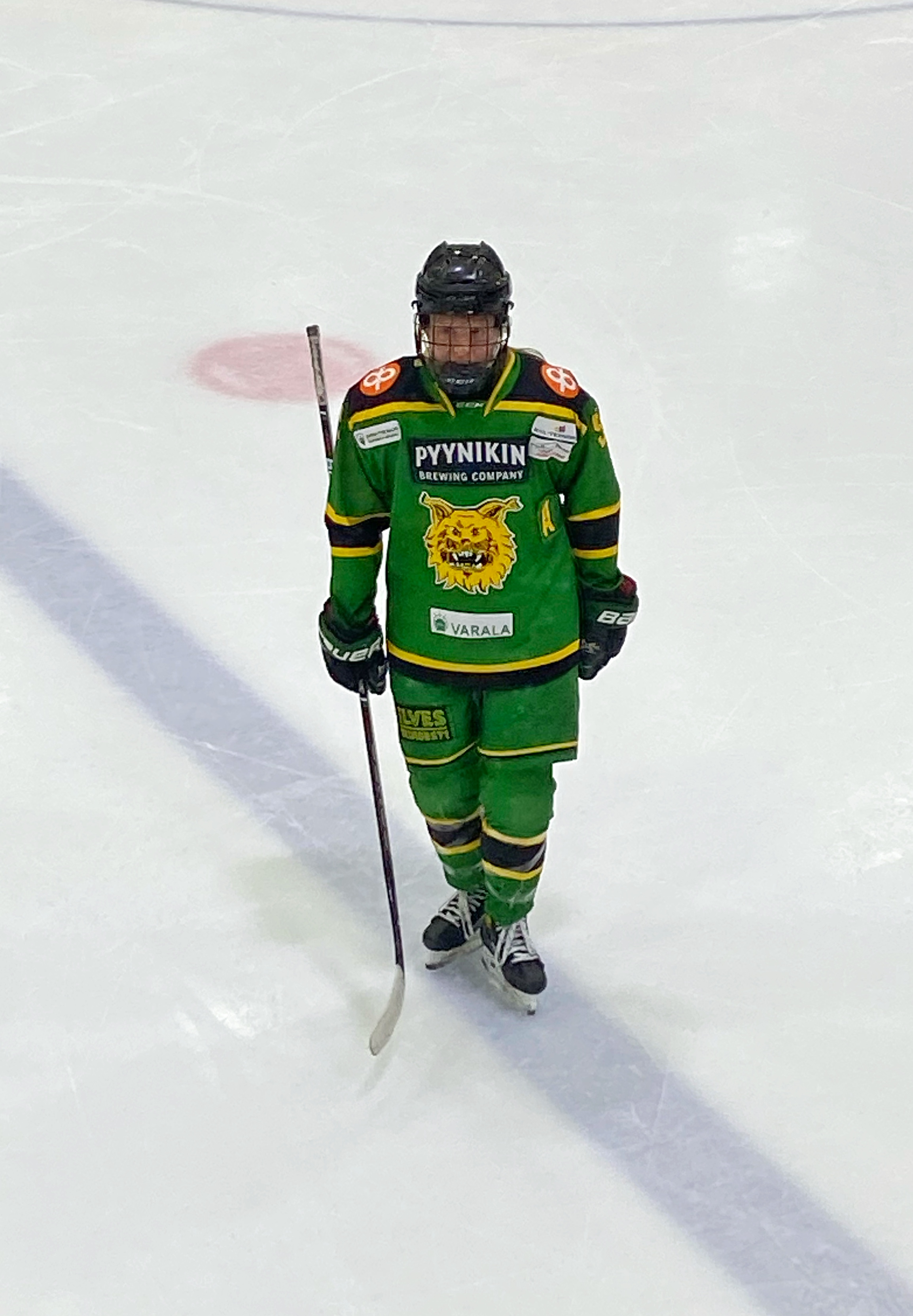
- Kilponen with Ilves in 2022
- Born: 16 May 1995 (age 31) Orivesi, Finland
- Height: 1.71 m (5 ft 7 in)
- Weight: 74 kg (163 lb; 11 st 9 lb)
- Position: Defense
- Shoots: Left
- NSML team Former teams: Tampereen Ilves: ZSC Lions Frauen; Metropolitan Riveters; KRS Vanke Rays; Linköping HC; Quinnipiac Bobcats; UND Fighting Hawks; Team Oriflame
- National team: Finland
- Playing career: 2009–present
Medal record
World Championship
Bronze medal – third place	2017 United States
Bronze medal – third place	2015 Sweden

Anna Kilponen (born 16 May 1995) is a Finnish ice hockey defenceman, currently playing in the Naisten Liiga (NSML) with the Ilves Tampere. She played four seasons of college ice hockey in the NCAA Division I, two seasons with the North Dakota Fighting Hawks and two seasons with the Quinnipiac Bobcats. Following her college career, she has played in the Swedish Women's Hockey League (SDHL) with Linköping HC, in the Zhenskaya Hockey League (ZhHL) with the KRS Vanke Rays, in the Premier Hockey Federation (PHF) with the Metropolitan Riveters, and in the Swiss Women's League with the ZSC Lions Frauen.

As a member of the Finnish national team, Kilponen won bronze medals at the IIHF Women's World Championships in 2015 and 2017 and represented Finland in the women's ice hockey tournament at the 2014 Winter Olympics in Sochi.

== Playing career ==
Kilponen began her senior career in Naisten SM-sarja, the highest level women's hockey league in Finland, in 2009 with the Tampereen Ilves. She was named an Ilves alternate captain in the 2010–11 season, when she was 15 years old. Kilponen also played with Team Oriflame in the Naisten SM-sarja from the 2011–12 to 2013–14 season and served as team captain for the 2012–13 season. In the 2014–15 season she returned to Ilves and served as captain.

Leading up to the 2015–16 season, Kilponen moved to the United States to attend the University of North Dakota and play NCAA hockey with the North Dakota Fighting Hawks. She played with the Fighting Hawks for two seasons, serving as an alternate captain in 2016–17, until the women's ice hockey program was cut by the university in March 2017. Kilponen then transferred to Quinnipiac University and played for the Quinnipiac Bobcats until graduating in 2019.

Kilponen signed in the Swedish Women's Hockey League (SDHL) with Linköping HC and made her debut with the team in the 2019–20 season. Her one-goal and two assists across the 36-game season marked a career low for Kilponen.

Following the disappointing season in Sweden, she returned to Ilves and resumed her prior role as team captain ahead of the 2020–21 Naisten Liiga season. She and defensive partner Reettu Kulhua led all Ilves defenders in points that season and she was selected to the 2021 Naisten Liiga All-Star team.

In September 2021, she briefly joined the KRS Vanke Rays for the 2021 ZhHL Cup Final. She played in all three games but did not record any points, as KRS fell to Agidel Ufa.

Kilponen continued as captain of Ilves to begin the 2021–22 season. She notched three goals and eight assists in seventeen games before departing the league to rejoin the KRS Vanke Rays for the later part of the 2021–22 ZhHL season. With KRS, she won the 2022 ZhHL Championship, contributing two goals and two assists in eight games to their playoff victory.

Ahead of the 2022–23 season, she signed a one-year contract with the Metropolitan Riveters of the Premier Hockey Federation (PHF). Playing on the top defensive pairing with Minttu Tuominen, she tallied twelve assists in 24 games and participated in the PHF All-Star Game with Team World.

Kilponen re-signed with the Riveters for the 2023–24 season in May 2023. In late June, the PHF was bought out and dissolved, leaving her without a contract for the upcoming season. She signed with the ZSC Lions Frauen of the Women's League (SWHL A) in late July, becoming one of the first former PHFers to find a new team after the voiding of PHF contracts.

On 20 November 2023, after playing twelve games and recording three goals and four points with the ZSC Lions, it was announced that Kilponen would not continue the season with the club for personal reasons. Several days later, her transfer to Ilves was reported.

== International career ==
Kilponen was selected for the Finland women's national ice hockey team in the 2014 Winter Olympics. She played in all six games, recording two assists.

As of 2014, Kilponen has also appeared for Finland at two IIHF Women's World Championships. Her first appearance came in 2012.

As a junior player with the Finnish national under-18 team, she participated in the IIHF U18 Women's World Championship in 2011, served as captain in 2012, and was an alternate captain in 2013. She won a bronze medal at the 2011 tournament and was selected as a top-three player for Finland by the coaches at the 2012 and 2013 tournaments.

== Career statistics ==
=== International ===
Year	Team	Event	Result	GP	G	A	Pts	PIM
2011	Finland U18	WW18	3rd place, bronze medalist(s)	6	0	1	1	4
2012	Finland U18	WW18	5th	5	1	2	3	4
2012	Finland	WW	4th	6	0	0	0	0
2013	Finland U18	WW18	5th	5	1	2	3	6
2013	Finland	WW	4th	6	0	0	0	0
2014	Finland	OG	5th	6	0	2	2	2
2015	Finland	WW	3rd place, bronze medalist(s)	6	1	0	1	0
2016	Finland	WW	4th	6	0	0	0	2
2017	Finland	WW	3rd place, bronze medalist(s)	6	0	1	1	4
Junior totals				16	2	5	7	14
Senior totals				36	1	3	4	8

== See also ==
- List of Olympic women's ice hockey players for Finland
- List of Finnish women in North American collegiate ice hockey
