= Krista Parkkonen =

Finnish ice hockey player (born 2002)

- Born: 25 June 2002 (age 24) Lappeenranta, Finland
- Height: 168 cm (5 ft 6 in)
- Weight: 64 kg (141 lb; 10 st 1 lb)
- Position: Defense
- Shoots: Left
- SDHL team Former teams: Färjestad BK: Minnesota Duluth; Minnesota; Vermont; IFK Helsinki; SaiPa Lappeenranta
- National team: Finland
- Playing career: 2017–present
Medal record
World Championship
Bronze medal – third place	2024 United States
Bronze medal – third place	2025 Czechia

Krista Parkkonen (born 25 June 2002) is a Finnish ice hockey player and member of the Finnish national team. She is signed with Färjestad BK in the Swedish Women's Hockey League (SDHL) for the 2026–27 season.

== Playing career ==
Parkkonen first played ice hockey at age 4 or 5, participating in a youth hockey school in her hometown of Lappeenranta, a city in South Karelia situated 30 kilometres (19 miles) from the Russian border. She played on girls' teams for a few years. Early on, she set her sights on playing for the national team and having a college ice hockey career in the United States, which prompted her to switch to playing with the boys' teams for her age group in the minor ice hockey department of SaiPa. At age fifteen, she made her debut with SaiPa Naiset, SaiPa's representative women's team in the third-tier Naisten Suomi-sarja but, as the women's team was not very competitive, she continued to spend most of her time playing on the boys' junior teams.

At age seventeen, Parkkonen was recruited to play for IFK Helsinki (HIFK) by the team's general manager and head coach, Saara Niemi. HIFK had gained promotion to the Naisten Liiga (NSML), the premier women's league in Finland, at the end of the previous season and Parkkonen was one of several stand-out players brought in to bolster the ranks. She saw great success in her first Naisten Liiga season, leading all HIFK defenders in scoring with five goals and sixteen assists for 21 points in 28 games, and was recognized with the Noora Räty Award as Naisten Liiga Rookie of the Year.

A staple of HIFK's blue line during the following two seasons, she earned second team Naisten Liiga All-Star selections in both the 2020–21 season and 2021–22 season.

=== College ===
In Autumn 2022, Parkkonen began her college ice hockey career with the Vermont Catamounts women's ice hockey program in the Hockey East (HEA) conference of the NCAA Division I. She was selected as an Hockey East Second-Team All-Star for the 2023–24 season.

Parkkonen and her Catamounts teammate Natálie Mlýnková left Vermont to join the Minnesota Golden Gophers women's ice hockey program ahead of the 2024–25 season.

After one season with the Minnesota Golden Gophers, Parkkonen transferred to the University of Minnesota Duluth and joined the Minnesota Duluth Bulldogs women's ice hockey program.

=== Professional ===
In April 2026, Parkkonen signed a contract with Färjestad BK in the SDHL for the 2026–27 season.

== International play ==
As a junior ice hockey player with the Finnish national under-18 team, Parkkonen participated in the IIHF U18 Women's World Championships in 2017, 2018, 2019, and 2020.

She made her debut with the senior national team at the 2022 IIHF Women's World Championship, at which she scored a goal and two assists in seven games. Representing Finland at subsequent IIHF Women's World Championships, she notched three assists at the 2023 tournament and won a bronze medal in 2024.

Parkkonen was named to The Hockey News' Top-35 U-23 Players in Women's Hockey in September 2022.

== Career statistics ==
=== Regular season and playoffs ===
Note: GP = Games played; G = Goals; A = Assists; Pts = Points; PIM = Penalty minutes;

			Regular season					Playoffs
Season	Team	League	GP	G	A	Pts	PIM	GP	G	A	Pts	PIM
2019–20	HIFK	NSML	28	5	16	21	63	3	0	1	1	0
2020–21	Ketterä U18	U18 Mestis	5	1	0	1	0	—	—	—	—	—
2020–21	HIFK (L)	NSML	22	4	10	14	8	8	1	4	5	0
2021–22	HIFK	NSML	19	5	9	14	4	9	1	4	5	39
2022–23	Vermont Catamounts	HEA	34	0	5	5	16	—	—	—	—	—
2023–24	Vermont Catamounts	HEA	33	6	15	21	8	—	—	—	—	—
2024–25	Minnesota Golden Gophers	WCHA	39	1	4	5	8	—	—	—	—	—
Naisten Liiga totals			69	14	35	49	75	20	2	9	11	39
NCAA totals			106	7	24	31	32	—	—	—	—	—

=== International ===
Note: GP = Games played; G = Goals; A = Assists; Pts = Points; PIM = Penalty minutes;

				Regular season
Year	Team	Event	Result	GP	G	A	Pts	PIM
2017	Finland	U18	5th	5	1	0	1	0
2018	Finland	U18	5th	5	0	1	1	4
2019	Finland	U18	3rd place, bronze medalist(s)	6	0	0	0	14
2020	Finland	U18	4th	6	0	0	0	6
2022	Finland	WC	6th	7	1	1	2	4
2023	Finland	WC	5th	7	0	3	3	0
2024	Finland	WC	3rd place, bronze medalist(s)	7	0	0	0	0
2025	Finland	WC	3rd place, bronze medalist(s)	6	0	1	1	7
Junior totals				22	1	1	2	24
Senior totals				27	1	5	6	11

== Awards and honors ==
Award	Year
International
World U18 Bronze Medal	2019
World Championship Bronze Medal	2024, 2025
College
All-Hockey East Second Team	2023–24
Naisten Liiga
Noora Räty Award (Rookie of the Year)	2019–20
All-Star Second Team	2020–21, 2021–22

== See also ==
- List of Finnish women in North American collegiate ice hockey
