= 2002–03 Minnesota Duluth Bulldogs women's ice hockey season =

NCAA Frozen Four, National Champions
- Conference: WCHA

Record
- Overall: 31–3–2

Coaches and captains
- Head coach: Shannon Miller

== Regular season ==
=== Standings ===
2002–03 Western Collegiate Hockey Association standings
	Conference								Overall					
	GP	W	L	T	SOW	PTS	GF	GA	GP	W	L	T	GF	GA
Minnesota Duluth†*	24	21	2	1	–	43	166	42	36	31	3	2	226	65
Minnesota	24	19	4	1	–	39	101	41	36	27	8	1	153	76
Wisconsin	24	14	6	4	–	32	79	50	35	22	8	5	110	67
Ohio State	24	8	13	3	–	19	56	76	37	12	22	3	88	114
Bemidji State	24	5	13	6	–	16	49	104	33	9	17	7	75	123
St. Cloud State	24	5	19	0	–	10	48	124	34	11	23	0	75	149
Minnesota State	24	3	18	3	–	9	41	103	34	10	21	3	77	118
Championship: † indicates conference regular season champion; * indicates conference tournament champion Updated July 20, 2024

- Jenny Potter set an NCAA record (since tied) for most goals in one game with 6. This was accomplished on December 18, 2002 versus St. Cloud State.
- February 22: Maria Rooth set the Bulldogs record for most points in a career. During the game against Bemidji State Rooth scored one goal and one assist to claim the record. She ended the season with 232 total points including 119 goals.
- February 23: The Bulldogs clinch the WCHA regular season title. The Bulldogs defeat Bemidji State to accomplish the milestone.

== Player stats ==
Player	GP	G	A	Pts	GWG	PPG	SHG
Jenny Potter	36	31	57	88	3	10	4
Caroline Ouellette	32	31	42	73	3	4	3
Erika Holst	32	34	30	64	9	8	0
Hanne Sikio	33	25	30	55	1	7	2
Maria Rooth	30	19	35	54	2	2	1
Krista McArthur	34	15	24	39	0	5	0
Tricia Guest	36	16	18	34	2	7	0
Nora Tallus	34	8	21	29	1	4	0
Navada Russell	34	5	18	23	0	3	0
Jenny Hempel	34	10	10	20	4	2	1
Joanne Eustace	30	5	14	19	2	3	0
Amelia Hradsky	36	8	10	18	1	0	0
Julianne Vasichek	36	0	15	15	0	0	0
Michelle McAteer	34	6	7	13	2	1	0
Larissa Luther	18	5	2	7	1	3	0
Meghan Stotts	33	2	5	7	0	0	0
Satu Kiipeli	25	1	6	7	0	0	0
Kristina Petrovskaia	18	2	4	6	0	0	0
Leah Kasper	23	2	2	4	0	0	0
Julie Fearing	34	1	2	3	0	0	0
Patricia Sautter	31	0	1	1	0	0	0
Lisa Hagen	5	0	0	0	0	0	0
Shannon Kasparek	11	0	0	0	0	0	0

== Postseason ==
- March 8: The Bulldogs earned their third WCHA Final Five title with a win over Minnesota (5–3).
- March 23: UMD make women's hockey history as the Bulldogs win their third straight NCAA Frozen Four tournament. The Bulldogs defeat Harvard in a double overtime win 4–3. The game was held in Duluth, MN in front of the largest crowd in women's hockey NCAA history (5,167). Nora Tallus scored the game winner 4:19 into the second overtime.

== Awards and honors ==
- November 11: Patricia Sautter was USCHO Defensive Player of the Week and WCHA Defensive Player of the Week. Sautter shut out Ohio State twice (Nov. 8 & Nov. 9).
- December 3: Tricia Guest was USCHO Offensive Player of the Week tallying four points.
- December 10: Jenny Potter, USCHO Offensive Player of the Week.
- January 14: Caroline Ouellette, USCHO Offensive Player of the Week (the third Bulldog to gain the honor in the season).
- January 28: Maria Rooth becomes the fourth player to gain USCHO Offensive Player of the Week honors.
- March 6: Jenny Potter, Caroline Ouellette, and Krista McArthur were named to the All-WCHA First Team
  - Maria Rooth and Erika Holst were All-WCHA Second Team selection.
  - Caroline Ouellette and Krista McArthur were WCHA All-Rookie Team selections.
  - Seven Bulldogs were recognized as WCHA All-Academic: Erika Holst, Satu Kiipeli, Michelle McAteer, Jenny Potter, Maria Rooth, Patricia Sautter and Juliane Vasichek.
- March 7: Jenny Potter was named a Patty Kazmaier Award Finalist for the second time in her career.
- March 8: Erika Holst, WCHA All-Tournament team.
  - Patricia Sautter, WCHA All-Tournament team.
  - Caroline Ouellette, WCHA tournament Most Valuable Player.
- March 23: Jenny Potter and Hanne Sikio were named to the Frozen Four All-Tournament team
  - Caroline Ouellette was named the Frozen Four tournament Most Valuable Player.
- March 23: Jenny Potter, First Team All-American honors (second time in her career).
  - Maria Rooth, Second Team All-American.

=== Postseason ===
- The Bulldogs coaching staff was named the American Association of College Coaches' women's hockey coaching staff of the year.
- June 17: The Bulldogs were honored for the third time at the White House by President George W. Bush.
