= Kristina Petrovskaia =

Russian ice hockey player

- Born: June 3, 1980 (age 46) Solnechny, Russian SFSR, Soviet Union
- Height: 5 ft 7 in (170 cm)
- Weight: 141 lb (64 kg; 10 st 1 lb)
- Position: Defence
- Shot: Left
- Played for: Minnesota Duluth Bulldogs; Tornado Dmitrov; HC Dinamo Saint Petersburg
- National team: Russia
- Playing career: 1996–2015
Medal record
Women's ice hockey
Representing Russia
World Championships
Bronze medal – third place	2001 United States

Kristina Valentinovna Petrovskaya (Russian: Кристина Валентиновна Петровская, born June 3, 1980) is a retired Russian ice hockey defenceman. She competed with the Russian women's national ice hockey team in the 2002, 2006, and 2010 Winter Olympic tournaments.

== Career stats ==
=== Minnesota Duluth Bulldogs ===
Year	Games Played	Goals	Assists	Points
2002-03	31	5	13	18
2001-02	18	2	4	6
