= List of Finnish women in North American collegiate ice hockey =

== NCAA Division 1 ==
The following table lists all Finns who have played or are committed to play women's ice hockey at the NCAA Division I level in the United States, sorted by conference and team. Players who have represented more than one team are listed with each program and appear more than once.

^	Denotes player active with specified program in the 2026–27 NCAA Division I women's ice hockey season
*	Denotes player has committed to play in a future season

Player	Pos.	Program	Conference	Start year	End year
Emmi Mourujärvi^	D	Lindenwood Lions	AHA	2026	
Katariina Soikkanen	D	Mercyhurst Lakers	AHA	2006	2007
Emma Nuutinen	F	Mercyhurst Lakers	AHA	2017	2020
Vilma Tanskanen	F	Mercyhurst Lakers	AHA	2017	2019
Jenna Silvonen	G	Mercyhurst Lakers	AHA	2019	2022
Emmi Mourujärvi	D	Mercyhurst Lakers	AHA	2023	2026
Sofia Nuutinen^	F	Mercyhurst Lakers	AHA	2023	
Julia Schalin	F	Mercyhurst Lakers	AHA	2024	2026
Tilli Keränen^	F	RIT Tigers	AHA	2025	
Meeri Räisänen	G	Robert Morris Colonials	AHA	2010	2011
Nea Tervonen^	F	Syracuse Orange	AHA	2023	
Kerttu Lehmus^	F	Syracuse Orange	AHA	2026	
Heidi Tallqvist	F	Findlay Oilers	CHA	2001	2004
Venla Heikkilä	F	Niagara Purple Eagles	CHA	2007	2008
Tiina Juvonen	F	Cornell Big Red	ECAC	1999	2000
Hilda Arhammar Pakarinen^	F	Harvard Crimson	ECAC	2026	
Heidi Tallqvist	F	Quinnipiac Bobcats	ECAC	2004	2005
Anna Kilponen	D	Quinnipiac Bobcats	ECAC	2017	2019
Heidi Huhtamäki	D	RPI Engineers	ECAC	2013	2016
Sirena Alvarez	G	St. Lawrence Saints	ECAC	2023	2024
Ida Kuoppala	F	Maine Black Bears	HEA	2019	2024
Kiia Lahtinen^	G	Maine Black Bears	HEA	2024	
Kerttu Lehmus^	F	Merrimack Warriors	HEA	2025	2026
Vilma Vaattovaara	G	New Hampshire Wildcats	HEA	2012	2016
Mari Pehkonen	F	Providence Friars	HEA	2006	2009
Viivi Vaattovaara	D	UConn Huskies	HEA	2013	2014
Sanna Valkama	F	Vermont Catamounts	HEA	2015	2019
Sini Karjalainen	D	Vermont Catamounts	HEA	2018	2023
Krista Parkkonen	D	Vermont Catamounts	HEA	2022	2024
Oona Havana^	F	Vermont Catamounts	HEA	2024	
Mira Jalosuo	D	Minnesota Golden Gophers	WCHA	2009	2013
Noora Räty	G	Minnesota Golden Gophers	WCHA	2009	2013
Nelli Laitinen	D	Minnesota Golden Gophers	WCHA	2022	2026
Krista Parkkonen	D	Minnesota Golden Gophers	WCHA	2024	2025
Julia Schalin^	F	Minnesota Golden Gophers	WCHA	2026	
Tuula Puputti	G	Minnesota Duluth Bulldogs	WCHA	1997	2002
Hanne Sikiö	F	Minnesota Duluth Bulldogs	WCHA	1999	2003
Jenni Venho	D	Minnesota Duluth Bulldogs	WCHA	1999	2001
Satu Kiipeli	D	Minnesota Duluth Bulldogs	WCHA	2000	2004
Sanna Peura	F	Minnesota Duluth Bulldogs	WCHA	2000	2001
Nora Tallus	F	Minnesota Duluth Bulldogs	WCHA	2001	2005
Anna-Kaisa Lemberg	G	Minnesota Duluth Bulldogs	WCHA	2003	2005
Suvi Vacker	D	Minnesota Duluth Bulldogs	WCHA	2003	2007
Mari Pehkonen	F	Minnesota Duluth Bulldogs	WCHA	2005	2006
Heidi Pelttari	D	Minnesota Duluth Bulldogs	WCHA	2006	2009
Saara Tuominen	F	Minnesota Duluth Bulldogs	WCHA	2006	2010
Mariia Posa	D	Minnesota Duluth Bulldogs	WCHA	2009	2012
Noora Jaakkola	D	Minnesota Duluth Bulldogs	WCHA	2010	2012
Tea Villilä	D	Minnesota Duluth Bulldogs	WCHA	2011	2015
Eveliina Suonpää	G	Minnesota Duluth Bulldogs	WCHA	2014	2014
Krista Parkkonen	D	Minnesota Duluth Bulldogs	WCHA	2025	2026
Pauliina Salonen^	F	Minnesota Duluth Bulldogs	WCHA	2026	
Tuuli Tallinen^	D	Minnesota Duluth Bulldogs	WCHA	2026	
Nina Tikkinen	F	Minnesota State Mavericks	WCHA	2007	2011
Emmi Leinonen	F	Minnesota State Mavericks	WCHA	2008	2012
Michelle Karvinen	F	North Dakota Fighting Hawks	WCHA	2011	2014
Susanna Tapani	F	North Dakota Fighting Hawks	WCHA	2013	2014
Anna Kilponen	D	North Dakota Fighting Hawks	WCHA	2015	2017
Vilma Tanskanen	F	North Dakota Fighting Hawks	WCHA	2015	2017
Emma Nuutinen	F	North Dakota Fighting Hawks	WCHA	2016	2017
Emma Laaksonen	D	Ohio State Buckeyes	WCHA	2000	2004
Minttu Tuominen	D	Ohio State Buckeyes	WCHA	2009	2013
Eve Savander	D	Ohio State Buckeyes	WCHA	2018	2022
Sara Säkkinen	F	Ohio State Buckeyes	WCHA	2018	2022
Sanni Vanhanen^	F	Ohio State Buckeyes	WCHA	2025	
Suvi Ollikainen	F	St. Cloud State Huskies	WCHA	2015	2019
Jenniina Nylund	F	St. Cloud State Huskies	WCHA	2018	2023
Sanni Ahola	G	St. Cloud State Huskies	WCHA	2020	2025
Linnea Melotindos	F	St. Cloud State Huskies	WCHA	2020	2021
Sofianna Sundelin^	F	St. Cloud State Huskies	WCHA	2023	
Emilia Kyrkkö^	G	St. Cloud State Huskies	WCHA	2024	
Siiri Yrjölä^	D	St. Cloud State Huskies	WCHA	2024	
Raili Mustonen^	F	St. Cloud State Huskies	WCHA	2025	
Hannele Tarkiainen^	D	St. Cloud State Huskies	WCHA	2025	

== NCAA Division III ==
The following table lists all Finns who have played or are committed to play NCAA Division III women's ice hockey in the United States, sorted by conference and team.

^	Denotes player active with specified program in the 2025–26 NCAA Division III women's ice hockey season
*	Denotes player has committed to play in a future season

Player	Pos.	Program	Conference	Start year	End year
Veera Marjomaa^	D	Hood Blazers	MAC	2025	
Peppi Kähkönen	F	Hamline Pipers	MIAC	2021	2024
Veera Salomaa	D	Finlandia Lions	NCHA	2018	2019
Roosa Siikki	F	Finlandia Lions	NCHA	2005	2006
Lotta Haarala	D	St. Norbert Green Knights	NCHA	2010	2012
Viivi Vaattovaara	D	Buffalo State Bengals	NEWHL	2014	2017
Sirena Alvarez	G	SUNY Canton Kangaroos	NEWHL	2019	2023
Iida Laitinen	F	SUNY Canton Kangaroos	NEWHL	2020	2024
Iida Laitinen	F	Wilkes University Colonels	UCHC	2024	2025

== U Sports ==
The following table lists all Finns who have played or are committed to play U Sports women's ice hockey in Canada, sorted by conference and team.

^	Denotes player active with specified program in the 2025–26 U Sports women's ice hockey season
*	Denotes player has committed to play in a future season

Player	Pos.	Program	Conference	Start year	End year
Sari Krooks	F	York Lions	OUA	1996	1997
Venla Hovi (née Heikkilä)	F	Manitoba Bisons	Canada West	2015	2018
Miressa Mäkelä	F	Manitoba Bisons	Canada West	2021	2022
Peppi Virtanen^	F	Saskatchewan Huskies	Canada West	2025	

== ACAC & RSEQ ==
The following table lists all Finns who have played or are committed to play women's ice hockey in the Alberta Colleges Athletics Conference (ACAC) or the Réseau du sport étudiant du Québec (RSEQ) in Canada. Both the ACAC and the RSEQ are member conferences of the Canadian Collegiate Athletic Association (CCAA), however, the CCAA does not sponsor national championships in women's ice hockey and the ACAC and RSEQ conference championships each represent the highest tier of achievement at the collegiate level in Canada.

^	Denotes player active with specified program in the 2025–26 ACAC or RSEQ women's ice hockey season
*	Denotes player has committed to play in a future season

Player	Pos.	Program	Conference	Start year	End year
Jenna Suokko	F	Olds College Broncos	ACAC	2015	2016

== See also ==
- Women's ice hockey in Finland
