= 2008–09 Ohio State Buckeyes women's ice hockey season =

- Conference: ECAC

Rankings
- USA Today/USA Hockey Magazine: TBD
- USCHO.com/CBS College Sports: TBD

Record
- Overall: 8-25-3

Coaches and captains
- Head coach: Jackie Barto

== Exhibition ==
Date	Opponent	Location	Score
Fri, Sep 26	Wilfrid Laurier	Columbus, Ohio	1 - 2 (L)

== Regular season ==
- Freshman goaltender Barbara Bilko appeared in two games. Both games were against nationally ranked Minnesota on January 9 and 10. In her first career appearance in net, she played over 33 minutes and made 26 saves. In both appearances, she totaled 43:21 in net with 38 saves and eight goals allowed.

=== Roster ===
Number	Name	Position	Shoots	Height	Year
3	Carlson, Brittany	D	L	5-3	Fr.
5	Spooner, Natalie	F	R	5-10	Fr.
6	Bishop, Teal	D	L	5-7	So.
7	Kilpatrick, Jenna	F	L	5-7	So.
8	Wild, Kelly	D	L	5-3	Fr.
9	Reilly, Shannon	D	R	5-5	So.
10	Feste, Melissa	F	R	5-3	Fr.
11	McIntosh, Laura	F	L	5-4	Fr.
14	Tonnessen, Michele	F	R	5-7	Jr.
15	Hostasek, Megan	D	R	5-9	Sr.
17	Marziali, Morgan	F	L	5-9	Sr.
18	Antognoli, Olivia	F	R	5-9	Sr.
19	Mancuso, Christina	F	L	5-7	So.
21	Theut, Kim	F	L	5-6	Fr.
23	Klassen, Hayley	F	R	5-7	Sr.
24	Nelson, Sandy	D	L	5-4	So.
27	Davis, Rachel	D	R	5-6	Jr.
28	LaRocque, Raelyn	F	L	5-6	Jr.
29	Bonanno, Liana	G	L	5-7	Sr.
33	Bilko, Barbara	G		5-5	Fr.
34	Facklis, Deidre	G	L	5-8	So.

=== Schedule ===
Date	Opponent	Location	Score
Fri, Oct 03	Providence	at Providence, R.I.	2 - 1 (W)
Sat, Oct 04	Providence	at Providence, R.I.	3 - 2 (W)
Fri, Oct 10	Wisconsin *	Columbus, Ohio	4 - 7 (L)
Sat, Oct 11	Wisconsin *	Columbus, Ohio	0 - 4 (L)
Fri, Oct 17	Minnesota *	at Minneapolis, Minn.	1 - 8 (L)
Sat, Oct 18	Minnesota *	at Minneapolis, Minn.	2 - 8 (L)
Fri, Oct 24	Bemidji State *	Columbus, Ohio	3 - 0 (W)
Sat, Oct 25	Bemidji State *	Columbus, Ohio	2 - 1 (W)
Sat, Nov 01	North Dakota *	at Grand Forks, N.D.	2 - 4 (L)
Sun, Nov 02	North Dakota *	at Grand Forks, N.D.	4 - 5 (L) OT
Sat, Nov 08	St. Cloud State*	at St. Cloud, Minn.	3 - 2 (W)
Sun, Nov 09	St. Cloud State *	at St. Cloud, Minn.	2 - 5 (L)
Fri, Nov 14	Minnesota Duluth *	Columbus, Ohio	0 - 3 (L)
Sat, Nov 15	Minnesota Duluth *	Columbus, Ohio	3 - 8 (L)
Fri, Nov 28	St. Lawrence	at Canton, N.Y.	1 - 5 (L)
Sat, Nov 29	St. Lawrence	at Canton, N.Y.	4 - 5 (L)
Fri, Dec 12	Minnesota State *	at Mankato, Minn.	6 - 5 (W)
Sat, Dec 13	Minnesota State *	at Mankato, Minn.	5 - 5 (T) W SO 1-0
Sun, Dec 14	U.S. Women's Select Team (Exhibition)	at Blaine, Minn.	1 - 8 (L)
Fri, Jan 02	Boston University	Columbus, Ohio	3 - 5 (L)
Sat, Jan 03	Boston University	Columbus, Ohio	2 - 2 (T) OT
Fri, Jan 09	Minnesota *	Columbus, Ohio	2 - 9 (L)
Sat, Jan 10	Minnesota *	Columbus, Ohio	1 - 12 (L)
Fri, Jan 16	St. Cloud State *	Columbus, Ohio	2 - 3 (L)
Sat, Jan 17	St. Cloud State *	Columbus, Ohio	3 - 4 (L)
Fri, Jan 23	Bemidji State *	at Bemidji, Minn.	3 - 3 (T) W SO 1-0
Sat, Jan 24	Bemidji State *	at Bemidji, Minn.	1 - 3 (L)
Sat, Jan 31	Wisconsin *	at Madison, Wis.	0 - 7 (L)
Sun, Feb 01	Wisconsin *	at Madison, Wis. 0 - 7 (L)	
Fri, Feb 06	North Dakota *	Columbus, Ohio	4 - 1 (W)
Sat, Feb 07	North Dakota *	Columbus, Ohio	4 - 2 (W)
Fri, Feb 13	Minnesota Duluth *	at Duluth, Minn.	1 - 4 (L)
Sat, Feb 14	Minnesota Duluth *	at Duluth, Minn.	2 - 7 (L)
Fri, Feb 20	Minnesota State *	Columbus, Ohio	5 - 6 (L)
Sat, Feb 21	Minnesota State *	Columbus, Ohio	1 - 2 (L)

=== Player performances ===
- As a freshman, Laura McIntosh led the Buckeyes in points with 39 and assists with 28. McIntosh never had more than one penalty called against her in a game. Her 39 points rank third all-time in the Buckeye records for freshman scoring, while her 28 assists are an OSU rookie record. In the WCHA, she ranked fifth in rookie scoring. In the NCAA, she ranked seventh in rookie scoring with 1.08 points per game. Thirty-four of her points (10g, 24a) came against WCHA opponents, which tied for eighth in the league. From November 29 to January 10, she had a seven-game point streak. On October 4, she recorded her first point by scoring the game winning goal in a 3-2 triumph over the Providence Friars. On October 10, the Buckeyes had their home opener, and McIntosh had two assists vs. Wisconsin. In a sweep of the Bemidji State Beavers, she assisted on three of five goals (Oct. 24–25). McIntosh had a point in 10 of 11 games between Nov. 29 – Jan. 24. On February 20, McIntosh recorded her first career hat trick with three goals in 6-5 loss to Minnesota State. Her season finished by assisting on a Buckeye goal in a 4-1 loss to Wisconsin on February 28.
- In her freshman season, Natalie Spooner played in 30 games (she missed six games due to her commitments with Team Canada). Despite playing in only 30 games, Spooner scored 21 goals to lead the Buckeyes. She added nine assists for 30 points, which ranked third on the Buckeyes.

== Postseason ==
=== WCHA Playoffs ===
Date	Opponent	Location	Score
Fri, Feb 27	Wisconsin	Verona, Wis.	0 - 7 (L)
Sat, Feb 28	Wisconsin	Verona, Wis.	1 - 4 (L)

== Player stats ==
=== Skaters ===
Player	Games Played	Goals	Assists	Points	Shots	Penalty Minutes
Laura McIntosh	36	11	28	39	107	22
Hayley Klassen	32	13	19	32	111	41
Natalie Spooner	30	21	9	30	177	22
Shannon Reilly	35	5	14	19	82	36
Morgan Marziali	27	9	6	15	67	36

=== Goaltenders ===
Player	Games Played	Minutes	Goals Against	Wins	Losses	Ties	Shutouts	Save %	Goals Against Average
Barbara Bilko	2	43:21	8	0	1	0	0	.826	11.07
Liana Bonnano	31	1706:37	108	7	20	2		.891	3.80
Deidre Facklis	10	417:41	46	1	4	1		.842	6.61

== Awards and honors ==
- Laura McIntosh, team's Most Valuable Freshman award (2008–09)
- Laura McIntosh, Ohio State Scholar-Athlete (2008–09)
- Laura McIntosh, WCHA Rookie of the Week honors (for the week of Nov. 1, 2008)
- Kelly Wild, Ohio State Scholar-Athlete (2008–09)
