= Nadine Muzerall =

Canadian ice hockey player and coach

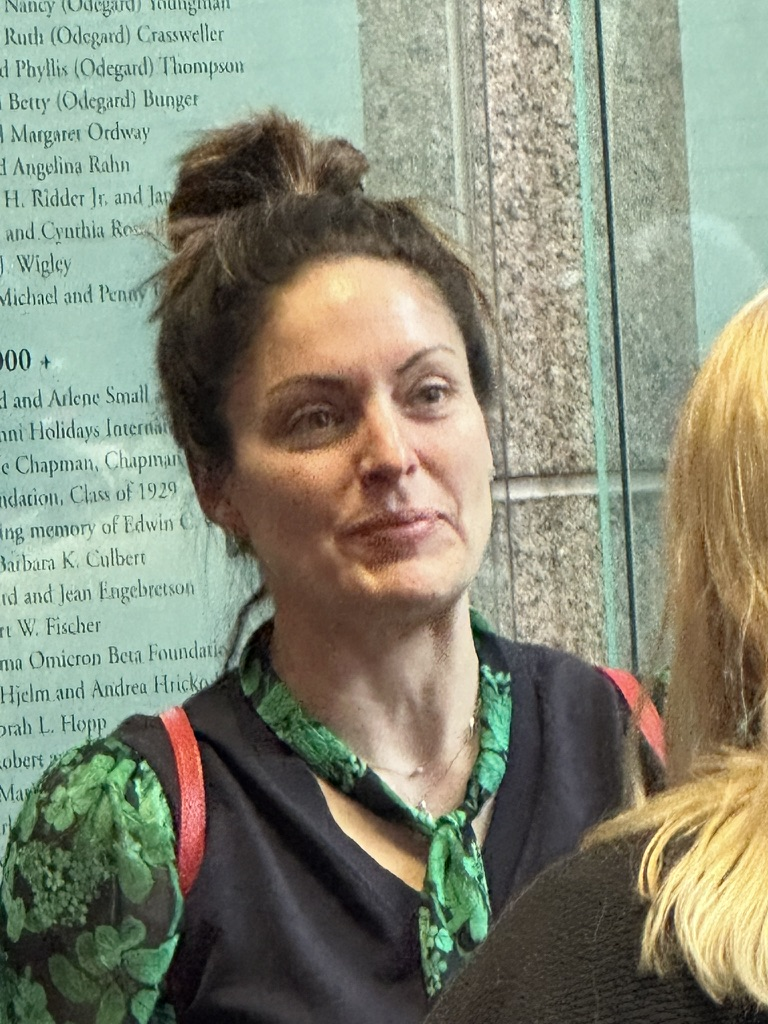
- Muzerall in 2025
- Born: October 19, 1978 (age 48) Mississauga, Ontario, Canada
- Height: 5 ft 7 in (170 cm)
- Weight: 147 lb (67 kg; 10 st 7 lb)
- Position: Forward
- Caught: Left
- WCHA team RL team: Minnesota Golden Gophers; HC Lugano Ladies Team
- National team: Canada
- Playing career: 1996–2001 Coaching career

Current position
- Title: Head coach
- Team: Ohio State
- Conference: WCHA

Biographical details
- Education: Minnesota

Coaching career (HC unless noted)
- 2011–2016: Minnesota (assistant)
- 2016–present: Ohio State

Head coaching record
- Overall: 224–81–22
- Tournaments: 10–4–0 (NCAA)

Accomplishments and honors

Championships
- NCAA Division I (2022, 2024); WCHA Tournament (2020, 2022, 2026); WCHA Regular Season (2023, 2024)

Awards
- WCHA Coach of the Year (2022, 2024)

Nadine Muzerall (born October 19, 1978) is a Canadian former ice hockey player and current coach of the Ohio State Buckeyes women's ice hockey team. While attending the University of Minnesota as a student, she became their all-time leader with 139 career goals, including a record 40 power-play goals. She was also a member of the inaugural team of University of Minnesota women's hockey.

== Playing career ==
In her freshman season, she had a 32-goal, 32-assist performance to earn Women's Hockey News Second Team All-American, Patty Kazmaier Award Finalist and team most valuable player accolades.

During her 1998-99 sophomore season, Muzerall was named a Second Team AWCHA All-American, and was part of the third-place finish at the 1999 AWCHA National Championship. She compiled totals of 30 goals, 18 assists and 48 points. Her numbers ranked in the top 20 nationally in seven offensive categories.

Muzerall scored the game-winning goal in the 2000 national championship win over Brown (Minnesota would win 4–2) and earned all-tournament honors with three goals and an assist in two games. For the season, Muzerall scored 49 goals, 28 assists and 77 points. Her 49 goals led the nation, power-play goals (16), power-play points (27) and game-winning goals (9). Her 49 goals sit atop the Minnesota season record book. In a 10–0 win over Bemidji State, Muzerall set school records with five goals and seven points. During the season, Muzerall went on a 20-game point streak, earned First Team All-WCHA and Minnesota team most valuable player honors.

Muzerall finished her collegiate career in 2000–01. She was part of the first ever WCHA Regular Season Championship, with contributions of 28 goals and 18 assists. For her efforts, she was named a Patty Kazmaier Award Finalist for the second time in her career. In the Minnesota career record book, Muzerall finished her career first in goals (139), goals-per-game (1.08), power-play goals (40) and shots (726), third in points (235), fourth in plus/minus (+149), fifth in shorthanded goals (4) and sixth in assists (96). She graduated with a degree in family social science.

== International ==
She was invited to attend Canada's National Women's Team Evaluation Camp from October 3–10, 2000. During the 2009–10 season, she played for Lugano in the Regio League in Switzerland.

== Coaching career ==
In the aftermath of her NCAA career in 2001, she taught an Introduction to Ice Hockey class in the kinesiology department during the 2001–02 academic year at the University of Minnesota. In 2003, she became head coach of the Northfield Mount Hermon School girls’ hockey team in Gill, Massachusetts. In 2007, Muzerall coached at the Digit Murphy Hockey Camp at Brown University. Previously, she was a camp director at the Florida Hockey Camp in Orlando, Florida. Starting in 2008, Muzerall has coached at the Hill Hockey Clinic in Newburyport, Massachusetts. She instructed players on skating fundamentals along with off-ice training. On October 27, 2011, it was announced that she became an assistant coach for the Minnesota Golden Gophers women's ice hockey team. She captured Frozen Four titles in 2012, 2013, 2015 and 2016.

=== Ohio State ===
Muzerall was named as the head coach of the Ohio State women's hockey team prior to the 2016–17 season. She helped guide the team to the school's first NCAA tournament and Frozen Four appearance in 2018. On March 8, 2020, the Buckeyes won the WCHA championship for the first time in the program's history. On March 20, 2022, the Buckeyes won the NCAA Women's Hockey National Championship for the first time in the program's history. In the 2022–23 season, Muzerall coached the Buckeyes to their second straight #1 overall seed in the 2023 NCAA Division I women's ice hockey tournament. The Buckeyes lost 1–0 to Wisconsin in the championship game. During the 2023–24 season, she led the Buckeyes to their second NCAA championship in program history. The Buckeyes played in the national championship game again in the 2024–25 season, losing to Wisconsin in overtime. In the 2025–26 season, the Buckeyes beat Wisconsin to win the WCHA tournament, but again fell to them in the national championship game.

Muzerall won the USCHO Coach of the Year award in 2022. She has won the WCHA Coach of the Year award five times: 2018, 2020, 2022, 2023, and 2024. She has coached 13 Olympians and 28 PWHL draft picks, including five first-round picks.

On May 20, 2024, Muzerall signed a five-year contract extension with Ohio State through the 2028–29 season. On March 19, 2026, Muzerall signed another five-year contract extension to keep her at Ohio State until the 2033–34 season.

=== Team Canada ===
Muzerall was named an assistant coach of Canada's National Women's Development Team for the 2016–17 season. She has served as a coach in prior years at selection camps for Canada's National Women's Development Team and Canada's National Women's Under-18 Team. On July 30, 2026, she was announced as the head coach of Canada’s National Women’s Under-18 Team during the 2026-27 season.

== Head coaching record ==
Record table
Season	Team	Overall	Conference	Standing	Postseason
Ohio State Buckeyes (Western Collegiate Hockey Association) (2016–present)
2016–17	Ohio State	14–18–5	7–16–5	5th	
2017–18	Ohio State	24–11–4	14–6–4	2nd	NCAA Frozen Four
2018–19	Ohio State	20–13–2	12–10–2	3rd	
2019–20	Ohio State	22–8–6	13–6–5	3rd	NCAA Qualifier (cancelled)
2020–21	Ohio State	13–7–0	12–5–0	3rd	NCAA Frozen Four
2021–22	Ohio State	32–6–0	21–6–0	1st	NCAA Champion
2022–23	Ohio State	33–6–2	23–4–1	1st	NCAA runner-up
2023–24	Ohio State	35–4–0	26–2–0	1st	NCAA Champion
2024–25	Ohio State	29–8–3	19–6–3	2nd	NCAA runner-up
2025–26	Ohio State	36–5–0	24–4–0	2nd	NCAA runner-up
Ohio State:		260–86–22	171–65–20		
Total:		260–86–22			
National champion Postseason invitational champion Conference regular season champion Conference regular season and conference tournament champion Division regular season champion Division regular season and conference tournament champion Conference tournament champion

== Awards and honors ==
- USCHO.com, Offensive Player Of the Week (Week of December 1, 1998)
- 1998—Nominee for Patty Kazmaier Memorial Award
- 1999 American Women's College Hockey Alliance All-Americans, Second Team
- On Sept. 27, 2007, Nadine Muzerall and former teammate Erica Killewald were inducted into the University of Minnesota's "M" Club Hall of Fame. The duo were the first women's hockey players to be inducted into the hall of fame and the youngest in the group of 13.
- 2018, 2020, 2022, 2023, 2024 WCHA Coach of the Year

== Personal ==
Her hockey gloves were on display in 2011 at the Hockey Hall of Fame in Toronto, Ontario.

== See also ==
- List of college women's ice hockey career coaching wins leaders
