= 2008–09 Harvard Crimson women's ice hockey season =

Ivy League title ECAC regular-season champions
- Conference: ECAC
- Home ice: Bright Hockey Center

Record

Coaches and captains
- Head coach: Katey Stone

The 2008–09 Harvard Crimson women's ice hockey team represented Harvard University. Led by Katey Stone, the Crimson went on a 12-game winning streak versus ECAC Hockey opponents. The Crimson would win the ECAC regular-season conference title for the second straight year. In addition, the Crimson would win the Ivy League title.

== Offseason ==
=== Recruiting ===
Player	Nationality	Position	Notes
Laura Bellamy	United States	Goaltender	Senior Goalie of the Year and All-Area Player of the Year in Duluth, Minnesota in 2009, two-time all-state selection, All-Lake Superior Conference first team in 2008-09
Margaret Chute,	United States	Forward	Minnesota Ms. Hockey top five finalist in 2009, member of the state championship team in hockey in 2007 and 2009
Jillian Dempsey,	United States	Forward	Boston Bruins John B. Carlton Award winner in 2009, member of the USA U-18 National Team that won the IIHF World Championship in 2009
Hilary Hayssen,	United States	Defense	Member of the hockey state championship team in 2007 and 2009 and the lacrosse state championship team in 2008, played high school hockey at The Blake School with Harvard teammates Katharine and Margaret Chute
Josephine Pucci,	United States	Defense	Captain of the Mid Fairfield Connecticut Stars which took silver in 2005 and bronze in 2008 and 2009 at the USA Hockey Nationals
Kelsey Romatoski,	United States	Defense	Minnesota Ms. Hockey top five finalist in 2009 led team to state hockey championship and was a member of the all-tournament team in 2005
Kaitlin Spurling,	United States	Forward	Chuck Vernon Award winner as Division I Tournament MVP in 2008, Eastern Independent League MVP in 2006 and 2007

== Player stats ==
Note: GP= Games played; G= Goals; A= Assists; PTS = Points; PIM = Penalties in minutes; GW = Game winning goals; PPL = Power-play goals; SHG = Short-handed goals

Player	GP	G	A	Pts	PIM	GW	PPL	SHG
Sarah Vaillancourt	27	25	27	52	34	4	6	2
Jenny Brine	29	16	15	31	18	3	4	1
Sarah Wilson	30	13	10	23	0	3	7	0
Katharine Chute	32	5	13	18	10	0	0	0
Liza Ryabkina	32	9	6	15	32	2	3	0
Cori Bassett	27	6	8	14	22	0	4	1
Anna McDonald	32	2	9	11	32	1	1	1
Kati Vaughn	32	1	10	11	28	1	0	0
Kate Buesser	32	6	4	10	22	1	1	0
Kathryn Farni	32	5	1	6	63	2	2	1
Randi Griffin	32	3	3	6	12	1	0	0
Leanna Coskren	30	1	3	4	18	0	0	0
Amy Uber	29	0	4	4	12	0	0	0
Jen Brawn	29	1	2	3	23	1	1	0
Nora Sluzas	26	0	3	3	14	0	0	0
Kirsten Kester	32	1	1	2	6	0	0	0
Deborah Conway	19	0	2	2	0	0	0	0
Alisa Baumgartner	31	1	0	1	10	0	0	0
Ashley Wheeler	14	0	1	1	4	0	0	0
Whitney Kennedy	26	0	1	1	6	0	0	0
Ling Ling Lok	3	0	0	0	0	0	0	0
Kylie Stephens	1	0	0	0	0	0	0	0
Christina Kessler	28	0	0	0	0	0	0	0
Brittany Martin	6	0	0	0	0	0	0	0

== Awards and honors ==
- Christina Kessler, First Team All-Ivy League
- Sarah Vaillancourt, First Team All-Ivy League
- Sarah Vaillancourt, 2009 First Team All-ECAC
- Sarah Vaillancourt, 2009 ECAC Player of the Year
