= 2008–09 Wilfrid Laurier Golden Hawks women's hockey season =

Wilfrid Laurier Golden Hawks women's ice hockey season

OUA Champions Canadian Interuniversity Sport women's ice hockey championship game, Runner-up
- Conference: OUA
- Home ice: Sunlife Financial Arena, Waterloo Recreation Complex

Record

Coaches and captains
- Head coach: Rick Osborne
- Captain: Andrea Ironside

The 2008–09 Wilfrid Laurier Golden Hawks women's hockey team represented Wilfrid Laurier University in the 2008-09 Canadian Interuniversity Sport women's hockey season. The Golden Hawks were coached by Rick Osborne. Assisting Osborne was Jim Rayburn. The Golden Hawks played their home games at Sunlife Financial Arena. The Golden Hawks were a member of the Ontario University Athletics and qualified for the Canadian Interuniversity Sport women's ice hockey championship game.

== Exhibition ==
Date	Opponent	Score	Time	Location
9/26/2008	Ohio State	2-1	7:07 PM	Columbus, Ohio
9/28/2008	Niagara University Purple Eagles	7-3	2:00 PM	Niagara University, Lewiston, New York
10/11/2008	Team Ontario	1-1	3:00 PM	Sunlife Financial Arena, Waterloo Recreation Complex
10/12/2008	Team Ontario	4-3	3:00 PM	Sunlife Financial Arena, Waterloo Recreation Complex
12/28/2008	Blue Water Jrs.	5-0	7:30 PM	Sunlife Financial Arena, Waterloo Recreation Complex

== Regular season ==
=== Roster ===
Number	Name	Position	Height
77	Lauren Barch	Centre	5-6
18	Laura Bartolini	Forward	5-4
91	Vanessa Bennett	Defence	5-7
15	Jessica Berrigan	Forward	5-8
9	Andrea Bevan	Defence	5-5
1	Chelsey Clarke	Goalie	5-7
17	Stephanie Crarey	Defence	5-5
21	Daniela Di Felice	Forward/Defence	5-7
35	Cindy Eadie	Goalie	6-0
42	Heather Fortuna	Forward	5-7
66	Andrea Ironside	Forward	5-4
14	Candace Kellough	Forward	5-10
27	Liz Knox	Goalie	5-5
22	Alicia Martin	Forward	5-4
12	Caitlin Muirhead	Forward	5-5
16	Kaley Powers	Forward	5-7
7	Kate Psota	Defence	5-6
11	Abby Rainsberry	Forward	5-2
2	Vanessa Schabkar	Centre	5-7
89	Katherine Shirriff	Centre	5-6
37	Alison Williams	Defence	5-9

=== Schedule ===
Date	Opponent	Score	Time	Location
10/4/2008	Waterloo	5-0	7:30 PM	CIF arena
10/10/2008	Western	4-1	7:30 PM	Sunlife Financial Arena
10/18/2008	Western	5-3	4:00 PM	Thompson Arena
10/19/2008	Windsor	5-0	3:00 PM	Pillars Ice
10/25/2008	Queen's	2-0	2:30 PM	Memorial Centre
10/26/2008	UOIT	9-0	3:30 PM	Campus Ice Centre
11/1/2008	Brock	3-0	3:00 PM	Seymour-Hannah Sports and Entertainment Centre
11/2/2008	Guelph	4-3	2:00 PM	Gryphon Centre
11/8/2008	UOIT	6-0	7:30 PM	Sunlife Financial Arena
11/9/2008	Queen's	5-1	3:00 PM	Sunlife Financial Arena
11/17/2008	Guelph	4-0	7:30 PM	Sunlife Financial Arena
11/22/2008	Toronto	2-0	7:30 PM	Varsity Arena
11/23/2008	York	3-1	6:00 PM	Ice Gardens
11/28/2008	York	3-1	7:30 PM	Sunlife Financial Arena
11/30/2008	Toronto	6-3	7:00 PM	Sunlife Financial Arena
1/10/2009	Windsor	1-0	4:10 PM	Windsor Arena, Windsor
1/11/2009	Western	5-2	7:30 PM	Sunlife Financial Arena
1/17/2009	Brock	2-1	3:00 PM	Sunlife Financial Arena
1/18/2009	UOIT	4-0	7:30 PM	Campus Ice Centre
1/24/2009	Waterloo	4-1	2:00 PM	CIF arena
1/25/2009	Waterloo	8-0	7:30 PM	Sunlife Financial Arena
1/31/2009	Toronto	1-0	3:00 PM	Sunlife Financial Arena
2/1/2009	Windsor	4-0	4:10 PM	Windsor Arena
2/5/2009	Guelph	2-0	7:30 PM	Sunlife Financial Arena
2/8/2009	Brock	3-1	3:00 PM	Sunlife Financial Arena
2/13/2009	Queen's	6-0	7:30 PM	Memorial Centre
2/21/2009	York	2-3	2:00 PM	Ice Gardens

=== Tournaments ===
The Golden Hawks competed in the Bisons UMSU Tournament. In the Championship Game, Manitoba beat the Golden Hawks 3-2 in Overtime.

Date	Opponent	Score	Time	Location
1/2/2009	Minnesota Thoroughbreds	3-1	11:30 AM	Max Bell Arena
1/2/2009	Manitoba	2-1	7:00 PM	Max Bell Arena
1/3/2009	Lethbridge	2-0	8:00 PM	Max Bell Arena
1/4/2009	Manitoba	2-3 (OT Loss)	11:30 AM	Max Bell Arena

== Player stats ==
=== Skaters ===
Player	Games Played	Goals	Assists	Points	Penalty Minutes	PP	SH
Andrea Ironside	26	15	18	33	22	6	0
Stephanie Crarey	27	0	6	6	18	0	0

=== Goaltenders ===
Player	Games Played	Minutes	Wins	Losses	Ties	GA	SO	Save %	GAA
Liz Knox	23	1351.68	22	1	0	21	10	0.953	0.93

== Postseason ==
=== OUA Semifinal ===
Date	Game	Opponent	Score	Time	Location
3/5/2009	(Gm 1)	Queen's	7-0	7:00 PM	Kingston Memorial Centre, Kingston
3/7/2009	(Gm 2)	Queen's	3-2	3:00 PM	Sunlife Financial Arena

=== OUA Finals ===
Date	Game	Opponent	Score	Time	Location
3/12/2009	(Gm 1)	Guelph	2-3	7:30 PM	Sunlife Financial Arena
3/14/2009	(Gm 2)	Guelph	2-1	7:30 PM	Gryphon Centre
3/15/2009	(Gm 3)	Guelph	3-2	7:30 PM	Sunlife Financial Arena

=== CIS Championships ===
Date	Opponent	Score	Time	Location
3/19/2009	Ottawa	6-1	3:00 PM	Keating Millennium Centre, Antigonish, NS
3/21/2009	Moncton	5-3	3:00 PM	Keating Millennium Centre
3/22/2009	McGill	1-3	7:00 PM	Keating Millennium Centre, Antigonish, NS

== Awards and honors ==
- Andrea Ironside, 2008/2009 Women's Hockey OUA First Team All-Star
- Andrea Ironside, 2008/2009 Women's Hockey CIS Championship Tournament All-Star
- Andrea Ironside, Monday, November 24, 2008, Laurier Athlete of the Week

=== All-Canadian honors ===
- Defence - Andrea Bevan, First Team
- Forward - Andrea Ironside, Second Team
