= 2024–25 Wisconsin Badgers women's ice hockey season =

WCHA regular season champion WCHA tournament champion National Championship, W, 4–3 ^{(OT)} vs Ohio State
- Conference: 1st WCHA
- Home ice: LaBahn Arena

Rankings
- USA Today: #1
- USCHO.com: #1

Record
- Overall: 38–1–2
- Conference: 25–1–2
- Home: 17–0–1
- Road: 17–1–0
- Neutral: 4–0–1

Coaches and captains
- Head coach: Mark Johnson
- Assistant coaches: Dan Koch; Jackie Crum; Mark Greenhalgh
- Captain(s): Caroline Harvey; Casey O'Brien
- Alternate captain(s): Lacey Eden; Laila Edwards

The 2024–25 Wisconsin Badgers women's ice hockey season represented the University of Wisconsin–Madison during the 2024–25 NCAA Division I women's ice hockey season. They played their home games at LaBahn Arena and are coached by Mark Johnson in his 22nd season. Wisconsin finished the regular season with a program-record 31 wins.

== Offseason ==
=== Recruiting ===
Player	Position	Nationality	Notes
Grace Bickett	Defense	United States	Played for Orono High School
Hannah Halverson	Forward	United States	Won two Minnesota State Championship's with Edina
Quinn Kuntz	Goalie	United States	Graduate transfer from Ohio State
Finley McCarthy	Forward	United States	Played for the USA-U18 team
Maggie Scannell	Forward	United States	Played for the USA-U18 team
Emma Venusio	Defense	Canada	Played for the Canada-U18 team
McKayla Zilisch	Forward	United States	Transferred from Bemidji State

=== Departing players ===
Player	Position	Nationality	Notes
Britta Curl	Forward	United States	Graduated
Chayla Edwards	Forward	United States	Graduated
Jane Gervais	Goalie	Canada	Transferred to Vermont
Sophie Helgeson	Defense	United States	Transferred to RPI
Maddi Wheeler	Forward	Canada	Transferred to Ohio State
Anna Wilgren	Defense	United States	Graduated

=== PWHL Draft ===
Round	Pick	Player	Team
2	9	Britta Curl	Minnesota Frost
4	23	Dara Greig	Montreal Victoire
5	29	Anna Wilgren	Montreal Victoire

== Roster ==
As of March 3, 2025.

No.	Nat.	Player	Class	Pos	Height	DoB	Hometown	Previous team
2	(United States)	Finley McCarthy	Freshman	F	5' 9" (1.75 m)	2005-12-09	Whitefish, Montana	Bishop Kearney Selects
4	(United States)	Caroline Harvey (C)	Junior	D	5' 8" (1.73 m)	2002-10-14	Salem, New Hampshire	North American Hockey Academy
6	(United States)	Lacey Eden (A)	Senior (RS)	F	5' 8" (1.73 m)	2002-05-02	Annapolis, Maryland	Shattuck-Saint Mary's
7	(United States)	Kelly Gorbatenko	Sophomore	F	5' 11" (1.8 m)	2004-08-05	Barrington, Illinois	Chicago Mission
8	(United States)	Hannah Halverson	Freshman	F	5' 6" (1.68 m)	2005-10-25	Edina, Minnesota	Edina High School
9	(Canada)	Ava Murphy	Sophomore	D	5' 9" (1.75 m)	2005-04-15	Kitchener, Ontario	Oakville Hornets
10	(United States)	Laila Edwards (A)	Junior	F	6' 1" (1.85 m)	2004-01-25	Cleveland Heights, Ohio	Selects Academy
11	(United States)	Cassie Hall	Sophomore	F	5' 6" (1.68 m)	2005-10-18	South Lyon, Michigan	Little Caesars
12	(United States)	McKayla Zilisch	Junior	F	5' 7" (1.7 m)	2004-04-26	Appleton, Wisconsin	Bemidji State
14	(United States)	Maggie Scannell	Freshman	F	5' 10" (1.78 m)	2006-03-24	Wynantskill, New York	Shattuck-Saint Mary's
16	(United States)	Claire Enright	Sophomore (RS)	F	5' 5" (1.65 m)	2004-04-16	Farmington, Minnesota	Lakeville South High School
17	(United States)	Grace Bickett	Freshman	D	5' 4" (1.63 m)	2006-05-31	Orono, Minnesota	Orono High School
18	(Canada)	Marianne Picard	Junior (RS)	F	5' 6" (1.68 m)	2002-11-13	Repentigny, Quebec	Stanstead College
19	(United States)	Bella Vasseur	Sophomore	F	5' 7" (1.7 m)	2005-02-15	Oregon, Wisconsin	Bishop Kearney Selects
20	(United States)	Vivian Jungels	Junior	D	5' 7" (1.7 m)	2003-10-08	Edina, Minnesota	Edina High School
21	(Canada)	Emma Venusio	Freshman	D	5' 6" (1.68 m)	2006-09-21	Toronto, Ontario	Etobicoke
22	(United States)	Laney Potter	Sophomore	D	5' 11" (1.8 m)	2004-12-05	Cranberry Township, Pennsylvania	Philadelphia Jr. Flyers
23	(Canada)	Sarah Wozniewicz	Senior	F	5' 7" (1.7 m)	2003-08-25	Cochrane, Alberta	Edge School
24	(United States)	Katie Kotlowski	Graduate (RS)	D	5' 10" (1.78 m)	2001-08-03	La Crosse, Wisconsin	Warroad High School
26	(United States)	Casey O'Brien (C)	Graduate	F	5' 4" (1.63 m)	2001-08-27	Milton, Massachusetts	Shattuck-Saint Mary's
27	(United States)	Kirsten Simms	Junior	F	5' 6" (1.68 m)	2004-08-31	Plymouth, Michigan	Little Caesars
30	(United States)	Ava McNaughton	Sophomore	G	6' 0" (1.83 m)	2004-10-27	Seven Fields, Pennsylvania	Bishop Kearney Selects
32	(United States)	Chloe Baker	Sophomore (RS)	G	5' 6" (1.68 m)	2004-07-02	Hermosa Beach, California	Chicago Mission
35	(United States)	Quinn Kuntz	Graduate (RS)	G	5' 7" (1.7 m)	2001-02-17	Warroad, Minnesota	Ohio State

== Standings ==
2024–25 Western Collegiate Hockey Association standings
	Conference										Overall					
	GP	W	L	T	OTW	OTL	SOW	PTS	GF	GA	GP	W	L	T	GF	GA
#1 Wisconsin†*	28	25	1	2	1	0	1	77	137	35	41	38	1	2	221	48
#2 Ohio State	28	19	6	3	3	0	2	59	95	58	40	29	8	3	155	83
#4 Minnesota	28	19	8	1	1	0	0	57	95	69	42	29	12	1	153	104
#6 Minnesota Duluth	28	14	12	2	0	2	2	48	76	53	39	22	15	2	114	70
#11 St. Cloud State	28	10	13	5	1	1	1	36	53	71	36	15	15	6	74	82
Minnesota State	28	7	19	2	0	4	1	28	70	97	37	14	21	2	105	118
St. Thomas	28	6	21	1	2	2	1	20	47	116	36	9	25	2	73	140
Bemidji State	28	4	24	0	1	0	0	11	34	108	37	6	30	1	56	148
Championship: March 8, 2025 † indicates conference regular season champion; * indicates conference tournament champion Rankings: USCHO.com; updated March 23, 2025

== Schedule and results ==
Date	Time	Opponent^{#}	Rank^{#}	Site	Decision	Result	Attendance	Record
Regular Season
September 27	7:00 PM	Lindenwood*	#2	LaBahn Arena • Madison, WI	McNaughton	W 12–0	2,273	1–0–0
September 28	2:00 PM	Lindenwood*	#2	LaBahn Arena • Madison, WI	McNaughton	W 8–1	2,235	2–0–0
October 4	5:00 PM	at Boston College*	#1	Conte Forum • Chestnut Hill, MA	McNaughton	W 7–1	303	3–0–0
October 5	5:00 PM	at Boston College*	#1	Conte Forum • Chestnut Hill, MA	McNaughton	W 7–0	230	4–0–0
October 12	2:00 PM	#3 Minnesota Duluth	#1	LaBahn Arena • Madison, WI	McNaughton	W 5–1	2,273	5–0–0 (1–0–0)
October 13	2:00 PM	#3 Minnesota Duluth	#1	LaBahn Arena • Madison, WI	McNaughton	W 7–3	2,273	6–0–0 (2–0–0)
October 18	6:00 PM	at #3 Minnesota	#1	Ridder Arena • Minneapolis, MN	McNaughton	W 5–0	3,139	7–0–0 (3–0–0)
October 19	3:00 PM	at #3 Minnesota	#1	Ridder Arena • Minneapolis, MN	McNaughton	W 4–3	3,224	8–0–0 (4–0–0)
October 24	7:00 PM	Bemidji State	#1	LaBahn Arena • Madison, WI	McNaughton	W 4–0	2,273	9–0–0 (5–0–0)
October 25	7:00 PM	Bemidji State	#1	LaBahn Arena • Madison, WI	McNaughton	W 6–0	2,273	10–0–0 (6–0–0)
November 1	3:00 PM	at #8 St. Cloud State	#1	Herb Brooks National Hockey Center • St. Cloud, MN	McNaughton	W 6–0	—	11–0–0 (7–0–0)
November 2	1:00 PM	at #8 St. Cloud State	#1	Herb Brooks National Hockey Center • St. Cloud, MN	McNaughton	W 4–0	325	12–0–0 (8–0–0)
November 15	5:00 PM	at #2 Ohio State	#1	Ohio State University Ice Rink • Columbus, OH	McNaughton	W 4–2	784	13–0–0 (9–0–0)
November 16	2:00 PM	at #2 Ohio State	#1	Ohio State University Ice Rink • Columbus, OH	McNaughton	L 2–3	807	13–1–0 (9–1–0)
November 22	7:00 PM	St. Thomas	#1	LaBahn Arena • Madison, WI	McNaughton	W 6–1	2,273	14–1–0 (10–1–0)
November 23	4:00 PM	St. Thomas	#1	LaBahn Arena • Madison, WI	McNaughton	W 5–2	2,273	15–1–0 (11–1–0)
November 29	5:00 PM	at Maine*	#1	Alfond Arena • Orono, ME	McNaughton	W 9–0	453	16–1–0
November 29	3:00 PM	at Maine*	#1	Alfond Arena • Orono, ME	Kuntz	W 6–1	373	17–1–0
December 6	3:00 PM	at Minnesota State	#1	Mayo Clinic Health System Event Center • Mankato, MN	McNaughton	W 2–1	324	18–1–0 (12–1–0)
December 7	2:00 PM	at Minnesota State	#1	Mayo Clinic Health System Event Center • Mankato, MN	McNaughton	W 5–0	317	19–1–0 (13–1–0)
January 2	7:00 PM	#2 Ohio State	#1	LaBahn Arena • Madison, WI	McNaughton	W 6–0	2,273	20–1–0 (14–1–0)
January 4	4:30 PM	vs. #2 Ohio State*	#1	Wrigley Field • Chicago, IL (Frozen Confines)	McNaughton	T 3–3 ^{SOL}	— (Note: attendance for the double-header event with (paired with a men's game) was 24,788)	20–1–1 (14–1–1)
January 11	5:00 PM	Minnesota State	#1	LaBahn Arena • Madison, WI	McNaughton	W 6–2	2,273	21–1–1 (15–1–1)
January 12	2:00 PM	Minnesota State	#1	LaBahn Arena • Madison, WI	McNaughton	W 3–1	2,273	22–1–1 (16–1–1)
January 17	7:00 PM	at St. Thomas	#1	St. Thomas Ice Arena • Mendota Heights, MN	McNaughton	W 6–1	621	23–1–1 (17–1–1)
January 18	3:00 PM	at St. Thomas	#1	St. Thomas Ice Arena • Mendota Heights, MN	McNaughton	W 11–1	625	24–1–1 (18–1–1)
January 25	2:00 PM	#11 St. Cloud State	#1	LaBahn Arena • Madison, WI	McNaughton	W 5–2	2,273	25–1–1 (19–1–1)
January 26	4:00 PM	#11 St. Cloud State	#1	LaBahn Arena • Madison, WI	McNaughton	T 2–2 ^{SOW}	2,273	25–1–2 (19–1–2)
January 31	6:00 PM	at #6 Minnesota Duluth	#1	AMSOIL Arena • Duluth, MN	McNaughton	W 2–1 ^{OT}	1,003	26–1–2 (20–1–2)
February 1	3:00 PM	at #6 Minnesota Duluth	#1	AMSOIL Arena • Duluth, MN	McNaughton	W 2–1	1,489	27–1–2 (21–1–2)
February 8	2:00 PM	#3 Minnesota	#1	LaBahn Arena • Madison, WI	McNaughton	W 8–2	2,273	28–1–2 (22–1–2)
February 9	12:00 PM	#3 Minnesota	#1	LaBahn Arena • Madison, WI	McNaughton	W 6–1	2,273	29–1–2 (23–1–2)
February 21	3:00 PM	at Bemidji State	#1	Sanford Center • Bemidji, MN	McNaughton	W 6–1	342	30–1–2 (24–1–2)
February 22	2:00 PM	at Bemidji State	#1	Sanford Center • Bemidji, MN	Kuntz	W 6–1	326	31–1–2 (25–1–2)
[[2025 WCHA women's ice hockey tournament|WCHA Tournament]]
February 28	7:00 PM	Bemidji State	#1	Labhan Arena • Madison, WI (Quarterfinals)	McNaughton	W 3–0	2,273	32–1–2
March 1	3:00 PM	Bemidji State	#1	Labhan Arena • Madison, WI (Quarterfinals)	McNaughton	W 11–0	2,273	33–1–2
March 7	1:00 PM	#6 Minnesota Duluth	#1	AMSOIL Arena • Duluth, MN (Semifinals)	McNaughton	W 3–1	867	34–1–2
March 8	2:00 PM	#4 Minnesota	#1	AMSOIL Arena • Duluth, MN (Championship)	McNaughton	W 4–3	1,715	35–1–2
[[2025 NCAA Division I women's ice hockey tournament|NCAA Tournament]]
March 15	2:00 PM	#9 Clarkson	#1	Labhan Arena • Madison, WI (National Quarterfinals)	McNaughton	W 4–1	2,421	36–1–2
March 21	7:30 PM	#4 Minnesota	#1	Ridder Arena • Minneapolis, MN (National Semifinals)	McNaughton	W 6–2	3,487	37–1–2
March 23	3:00 PM	#2 Ohio State	#1	Ridder Arena • Minneapolis, MN (National Championship)	McNaughton	W 4–3 ^{OT}	2,575	38–1–2
*Non-conference game. ^{#}Rankings from USCHO.com Poll. All times are in Central Time. Source:

== Rankings ==
Poll	Week																						
Poll	Pre	1	2	3	4	5	6	7	8	9	10	11	12	13	14	15	16	17	18	19	20	21	22 (Final)
USCHO.com	2	1	1	1	1	1	1	1	1	1	1	1	1	1	1	1	1	1	1	1	1	1	
USA Today	1	1	1	1	1	1	1	1	1	1	1	1	1	1	1	1	1	1	1	1	1	1	

== Home attendance ==
Wisconsin led all NCAA Division I women's ice hockey programs in both average and total home attendance, averaging 3,464 spectators and totaling 68,812 spectators in its 19 home games. This marked the eighth consecutive instance (Note: excluding the 2020-21 season, in which NCAA Division I hockey was played without spectators due to the COVID-19 pandemic) in which the program led in these home attendance metrics.

== Awards and honors ==
- Casey O'Brien - 2025 Patty Kazmaier Award
- Caroline Harvey - NCAA All-Tournament Team: 2025 -

=== Conference Honors ===
- Laila Edwards - 2025 WCHA First Team All-Star
- Caroline Harvey (ice hockey) - 2025 WCHA First Team All-Star
- Laney Potter - 2025 WCHA Third Team All-Star
- Caroline Harvey - 2025 WCHA Defender of the Year

=== HCA Awards ===
- Caroline Harvey - Hockey Commissioner Association Co-Player of the Month (October 2024)
- Casey O'Brien - Hockey Commissioner Association Co-Player of the Month (October 2024)
- Kirsten Simms - Hockey Commissioner Association Player of the Month (March 2025)
- Ava McNaughton - Hockey Commissioner Association Goaltender of the Month (March 2025)
