= St. Thomas Tommies (Minnesota) women's ice hockey =

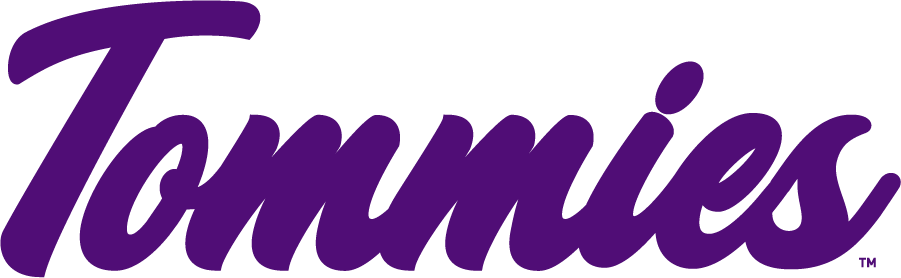
- University: University of St. Thomas (Minnesota)
- Conference: WCHA
- First season: 1998–99
- Head coach: Bethany Brausen; 1st season, 0–0–0 (–)
- Arena: Lee & Penny Anderson Arena; Saint Paul, Minnesota
- Colors: Purple and gray

NCAA tournament Frozen Four
- DIII: 2014, 2019

NCAA tournament appearances
- DIII: 2003, 2014, 2015, 2016, 2017

Conference tournament champions
- MIAC: 2003, 2014, 2015, 2016, 2017, 2019

Conference regular season champions
- DIII: 2003, 2004, 2014, 2016, 2018, 2019

The St. Thomas (Minnesota) Tommies women's ice hockey team represents the University of St. Thomas (Minnesota) in NCAA Division I competition in the Western Collegiate Hockey Association (WCHA).

== History ==
St. Thomas played their first varsity game during the 1998–99 season. In the last 20 years, the Tommies have never had a losing season. They finished third or better in the MIAC every year. In the program's 23-year history at the NCAA Division III level, the Tommies have won six conference championships, six conference tournament titles and reached the NCAA Division III frozen four once.

In 2019 the MIAC took the unprecedented step of removing St. Thomas from its membership because of concerns about “athletic competitive parity.” Because the removal affected all sports and was effective at the end of the 2020–21 season, St. Thomas had time to decide what it would do next. The women's ice hockey program was given the green light to jump directly to the Division I level in July 2020. The women's hockey team joined the WCHA for the 2021–22 season.

In 2023, St. Thomas announced plans for the new Lee & Penny Anderson Arena, with the team planned to begin playing its home games there in the fall of 2025.

== Current roster ==
As of August 21, 2022.

No.	Nat.	Player	Class	Pos	Height	DoB	Hometown	Previous team
2	(United States)	Maddy Clough	Sophomore	D	5' 3" (1.6 m)	2003-03-31	Andover, Minnesota	Andover High School
4	(United States)	Mary Zavoral	Freshman	F	5' 7" (1.7 m)	2004-02-11	Edina, Minnesota	Benilde-St. Margaret's
5	(United States)	Maija Almich (C)	Senior	F	5' 6" (1.68 m)	2001-01-05	Lino Lakes, Minnesota	Centennial High School
6	(United States)	Jenna Hartung	Senior	F	5' 4" (1.63 m)	2001-04-18	Burnsville, Minnesota	Burnsville High School
7	(United States)	Emma Larson	Senior	D	5' 6" (1.68 m)	2001-03-30	Maple Grove, Minnesota	Maple Grove High School
8	(United States)	Emma McCauley	Freshman	D	6' 1" (1.85 m)	2002-10-20	South Portland, Maine	Burlington Jr. Barracudas
9	(United States)	Kate Haug	Freshman	F	5' 6" (1.68 m)	2004-04-06	Roseville, Minnesota	Roseville Area High School
10	(United States)	Isabel Lippai	Junior	D	5' 4" (1.63 m)	2002-06-25	Woodbury, Minnesota	Woodbury High School
11	(United States)	Abby Promersberger	Sophomore	F	5' 6" (1.68 m)	2002-09-27	Fargo, North Dakota	Fargo North/South Spruins
12	(United States)	Maria Cooper	Freshman	F	5' 5" (1.65 m)	2003-12-24	Eagan, Minnesota	Eagan High School
13	(United States)	Molly Grundhoffer	Freshman	F	5' 5" (1.65 m)	2004-02-04	Mankato, Minnesota	Shattuck-Saint Mary's
14	(United States)	Allie Monrean	Senior	F	5' 5" (1.65 m)	2001-05-08	Anchorage, Alaska	Culver Academies
15	(United States)	Luci Bianchi (C)	Senior	F	5' 3" (1.6 m)	2000-12-22	Bloomington, Minnesota	Bloomington Jefferson High School
16	(United States)	Lauren Stenslie	Sophomore	F	5' 4" (1.63 m)	2002-10-24	Maple Grove, Minnesota	Maple Grove High School
17	(Hungary)	Lotti Odnoga	Graduate	D	5' 9" (1.75 m)	1999-01-19	Győr, Hungary	Dartmouth College
18	(United States)	Gabby Billing	Graduate	F	5' 3" (1.6 m)	1999-10-18	Rogers, Minnesota	Dartmouth College
19	(United States)	Anna Solheim (C)	Graduate	F	5' 7" (1.7 m)	1999-01-01	Shoreview, Minnesota	Mounds View High School
20	(United States)	Marki Oberg	Sophomore	F	5' 4" (1.63 m)	2002-09-06	Alexandria, Minnesota	Alexandria Area High School
21	(Canada)	Alli Pahl	Sophomore	D	5' 10" (1.78 m)	2002-12-24	Medicine Hat, Alberta	Rink Hockey Academy Kelowna
22	(United States)	Maddie Jurgensen	Sophomore	F	5' 10" (1.78 m)	2003-05-05	Andover, Minnesota	Andover High School
23	(United States)	Brieja Parent	Junior	F	5' 4" (1.63 m)	2001-11-09	Forest Lake, Minnesota	University of Minnesota Duluth
24	(United States)	Haley Maxwell	Freshman	D	5' 4" (1.63 m)	2003-08-07	Edina, Minnesota	Edina High School
26	(Switzerland)	Nicole Vallario	Sophomore	D	5' 5" (1.65 m)	2001-08-30	Lugano, Switzerland	HC Thurgau
27	(United States)	Anna Promersberger	Graduate	F	5' 8" (1.73 m)	1999-09-14	Fargo, North Dakota	Penn State University
29	(Switzerland)	Saskia Maurer	Sophomore	G	5' 5" (1.65 m)	2001-07-29	Röthenbach, Switzerland	EV Bomo Thun
30	(United States)	Alexa Dobchuk	Senior	G	5' 8" (1.73 m)	2000-07-01	Eden Prairie, Minnesota	Colgate University
35	(United States)	Maggie Malecha	Freshman	G	5' 5" (1.65 m)	2003-09-05	Northfield, Minnesota	Northfield High School

== Head coaches ==
As of November 20, 2024

Tenure	Coach	Years	Record	Pct.
2001–2007	Kevin Gorg	7	143–75–13	.647
2008–2021	Tom Palkowski	14	220–99–40	.669
2021–2024	Joel Johnson	3+	28–88–4	.250
2024–present	Bethany Brausen	1	0–0–0	–
Totals	4 coaches	24 Seasons	391–262–57	.591

== Season-by-season results ==
Won championship	Lost championship	Conference champions	League leader

Year	Coach	W	L	T	Conference	Conf. W	Conf. L	Conf. T	Finish	Conference Tournament	NCAA Tournament
2021–22	Joel Johnson	5	27	1	WCHA	3	23	1	8th WCHA	Lost Quarterfinals vs. Minnesota (0–4, 1–5)	Ineligible due to D1 transition
2022–23	Joel Johnson	8	27	1	WCHA	3	24	1	7th WCHA	Lost Quarterfinals vs. Minnesota (0-7, 2–6)	Ineligible due to D1 transition
2023–24	Joel Johnson	10	26	1	WCHA	4	23	1	7th WCHA	Lost Quarterfinals vs. Wisconsin (2-4, 1–9)	Ineligible due to D1 transition
2024–25	Joel Johnson, Bethany Brausen	9	25	2	WCHA	6	21	1	7th WCHA	Lost Quarterfinals vs. Ohio State (1-5, 1–4)	Did not qualify
