= Auroraliiga All-Star team =

Annual Finnish ice hockey honor

Auroraliiga All-Star Team
- Sport: Ice hockey
- League: Auroraliiga
- Awarded for: Best players at each position as selected by the coaches of the Auroraliiga
- Presented by: Finnish Ice Hockey Association

The Auroraliiga All-Star team (Finnish: Auroraliigan Tähdistökentällinen) or teams honor the best performers at each position over the Auroraliiga season and have been recognized since the 2006–07 season. Since the 2023–24 season, all-star team selection is done by the coaches of the Auroraliiga; previously, teams were selected by the Finnish Ice Hockey Association.

The career leader in selections is centre Linda Leppänen (née Välimäki), named to a total of eight all-star teams, four while playing with Ilves Tampere and four with Espoo Blues (Espoo United). Jenni Hiirikoski leads all defensemen in selections, with six, and Anni Keisala leads all goaltenders in selections, with five. Left winger Elisa Holopainen has the most selections per season played, with seven selections in seven seasons. Of players active in the league during the 2025–26 regular season, Anni Keisala and winger Emma Nuutinen led with five selections each.

French centre Estelle Duvin was the first international player to be honored as a first team all-star, selected for the 2020–21 season. Czech centre Michaela Pejzlová and French defenseman Athéna Locatelli were the first international players to be honored as second team all-stars, also for the 2020–21 season.

== All-Stars ==
^	Denotes player active in the 2026–27 Auroraliiga season
*	Denotes player inducted into the Finnish Hockey Hall of Fame
Player (X)	Denotes the number of times a player has been selected
**Player** **(in bold text)**	Denotes players who won the Riikka Nieminen Award as the Auroraliiga's Player of the Year in the same season

Season	Pos.	All-Star team			
Season	Pos.	Player		Team	
2006–07	G	Noora Räty (1)		Blues Espoo	
2006–07	D	Mira Jalosuo (1)		Kärpät Oulu	
2006–07	D	Kati Kovalainen (1)		IHK Helsinki	
2006–07	F	Anne Helin (1)		IHK Helsinki	
2006–07	F	Eini Lehtinen (1)		Kärpät Oulu	
2006–07	F	Karoliina Rantamäki^ (1)		Espoo Blues	
2007–08	G	Maija Hassinen (1)		Ilves Tampere	
2007–08	D	Jenni Hiirikoski (1)		Ilves Tampere	
2007–08	D	Mira Jalosuo (2)		Kärpät Oulu	
2007–08	F	Anne Helin (2)		IHK Helsinki	
2007–08	F	Michelle Karvinen (1)		Blues Espoo	
2007–08	F	Eini Lehtinen (2)		Kärpät Oulu	
2008–09	G	Anna-Kaisa Lemberg (1)		Salo HT	
2008–09	D	Mira Jalosuo (3)		Kärpät Oulu	
2008–09	D	Emma Laaksonen* (1)		Blues Espoo	
2008–09	F	Anne Helin (3)		Kärpät Oulu	
2008–09	F	**Michelle Karvinen** (2)		Blues Espoo	
2008–09	F	Linda Välimäki (1)		Ilves Tampere	
2009–10	G	Maija Hassinen (2)		HPK Hämeenlinna	
2009–10	D	**Jenni Hiirikoski** (2)		Ilves Tampere	
2009–10	D	Kati Kovalainen (2)		HPK Hämeenlinna	
2009–10	F	Sari Kärnä (1)		Ilves Tampere	
2009–10	F	Linda Välimäki (2)		Ilves Tampere	
2009–10	F	Marjo Voutilainen (1)		Blues Espoo	
2010–11	G	Maija Hassinen (3)		HPK Hämeenlinna	
2010–11	D	Anna Kilponen (1)		Ilves Tampere	
2010–11	D	Emma Laaksonen* (2)		Blues Espoo	
2010–11	F	**Anne Helin** (4)		Kärpät Oulu	
2010–11	F	Annina Rajahuhta (1)		HPK Hämeenlinna	
2010–11	F	Anne Tuomanen (1)		HPK Hämeenlinna	
2011–12	G	Isabella Portnoj (1)		Blues Espoo	
2011–12	D	Heidi Pelttari (1)		Ilves Tampere	
2011–12	D	Saija Tarkki* (1)		Kärpät Oulu	
2011–12	F	Anne Helin (5)		Kärpät Oulu	
2011–12	F	Venla Hovi (1)		HPK Hämeenlinna	
2011–12	F	**Nina Tikkinen** (1)		Kärpät Oulu	
2012–13	G	Meeri Räisänen (1)		JYP Jyväskylä	
2012–13	D	**Jenni Hiirikoski** (3)		JYP Jyväskylä	
2012–13	D	Heidi Huhtamäki (1)		Blues Espoo	
2012–13	F	Anne Helin (6)		Kärpät Oulu	
2012–13	F	Annina Rajahuhta (2)		Blues Espoo	
2012–13	F	Linda Välimäki (3)		Blues Espoo	
2013–14	G	Meeri Räisänen (2)		JYP Jyväskylä	
2013–14	D	**Jenni Hiirikoski** (4)		JYP Jyväskylä	
2013–14	D	Anna Kilponen (2)		Team Oriflame	
2013–14	F	Emma Nuutinen (1)		Blues Espoo	
2013–14	F	Annina Rajahuhta (3)		Blues Espoo	
2013–14	F	Linda Välimäki (4)		Blues Espoo	
2014–15	G	Anni Keisala (1)		Team Kuortane	
2014–15	D	**Jenni Hiirikoski** (5)		JYP Jyväskylä	
2014–15	D	Minttu Tuominen (1)		Blues Espoo	
2014–15	F	Matilda Nilsson^ (1)		KalPa Kuopio	
2014–15	F	Saila Saari (1)		JYP Jyväskylä	
2014–15	F	Linda Välimäki (5)		Blues Espoo	
2015–16	G	Anni Keisala (2)		Team Kuortane	
2015–16	D	**Jenni Hiirikoski** (6)		JYP Jyväskylä	
2015–16	D	Minttu Tuominen (2)		Blues Espoo	
2015–16	F	Sari Kärnä (2)		JYP Jyväskylä	
2015–16	F	Tanja Niskanen (1)		JYP Jyväskylä	
2015–16	F	Emma Nuutinen (2)		Blues Espoo	
2016–17	G	Eveliina Suonpää (1)		Lukko Rauma	
2016–17	D	Mira Huhta (1)		Espoo United	
2016–17	D	**Isa Rahunen** (1)		Kärpät Oulu	
2016–17	F	Annina Rajahuhta (4)		Espoo United	
2016–17	F	Saila Saari (2)		Kärpät Oulu	
2016–17	F	Linda Välimäki (6)		Espoo United	
Season	Pos.	First team		Second team	
Season	Pos.	Player	Team	Player	Team
2017–18	G	Meeri Räisänen (3)	HPK Hämeenlinna	Jenna Silvonen (1)	Blues Espoo
2017–18	D	Isa Rahunen (2)	Kärpät Oulu	Eve Savander (1)	Team Kuortane
2017–18	D	Minttu Tuominen (3)	Blues Espoo	Ella Viitasuo (1)	Espoo Blues
2017–18	LW	Petra Nieminen (1)	Team Kuortane	Elisa Holopainen (1)	KalPa Kuopio
2017–18	C	**Linda Välimäki** (7)	Ilves Tampere	Saija Tarkki* (2)	Kärpät Oulu
2017–18	RW	Riikka Noronen (1)	Ilves Tampere	Matilda Nilsson^ (2)	KalPa Kuopio
2018–19	G	Jenna Silvonen (2)	Blues Espoo	Johanna Oksman (1)	Kärpät Oulu
2018–19	D	Nelli Laitinen (1)	Blues Espoo	Reetu Kulhua (1)	Ilves Tampere
2018–19	D	Minttu Tuominen (4)	Blues Espoo	Isa Rahunen (3)	Kärpät Oulu
2018–19	LW	**Elisa Holopainen** (2)	KalPa Kuopio	Niina Mäkinen (1)	Kärpät Oulu
2018–19	C	Tanja Niskanen (2)	KalPa Kuopio	Linda Välimäki (8)	Ilves Tampere
2018–19	RW	Annina Rajahuhta (5)	Blues Espoo	Matilda Nilsson^ (3)	KalPa Kuopio
2019–20	G	Johanna Oksman (2)	Kärpät Oulu	Tiina Ranne^ (1)	KalPa Kuopio
2019–20	D	Nelli Laitinen (2)	Kiekko-Espoo	Reetu Kulhua (2)	Ilves Tampere
2019–20	D	Minttu Tuominen (5)	Kiekko-Espoo	Isa Rahunen (4)	Kärpät Oulu
2019–20	LW	Elisa Holopainen (3)	KalPa Kuopio	Ida Karjalainen (1)	HPK Hämeenlinna
2019–20	C	**Tanja Niskanen** (3)	KalPa Kuopio	Viivi Vainikka (1)	Team Kuortane
2019–20	RW	Matilda Nilsson^ (4)	KalPa Kuopio	Kiira Yrjänen^ (1)	Team Kuortane
2020–21	G	Anni Keisala (3)	Ilves Tampere	Tiina Ranne^ (2)	KalPa Kuopio
2020–21	D	Anna Kilponen (3)	Ilves Tampere	Athéna Locatelli (1)	IFK Helsinki
2020–21	D	Nelli Laitinen (3)	Kiekko-Espoo	Krista Parkkonen (1)	IFK Helsinki
2020–21	LW	**Elisa Holopainen** (4)	KalPa Kuopio	Jenna Suokko (1)	Ilves Tampere
2020–21	C	Estelle Duvin (1)	TPS Turku	Michaela Pejzlová (1)	IFK Helsinki
2020–21	RW	Matilda Nilsson^ (5)	KalPa Kuopio	Emilia Vesa (1)	Kiekko-Espoo
2021–22	G	**Anni Keisala** (4)	Ilves Tampere	Iina Kuusela (1)	IFK Helsinki
2021–22	D	Nelli Laitinen (4)	Kiekko-Espoo	Krista Parkkonen (2)	IFK Helsinki
2021–22	D	Sanni Rantala (1)	Kiekko-Espoo	Oona Koukkula (1)	Team Kuortane
2021–22	LW	Elisa Holopainen (5)	Kiekko-Espoo	Sofianna Sundelin (1)	Team Kuortane
2021–22	C	Estelle Duvin (2)	TPS Turku	Michaela Pejzlová (2)	IFK Helsinki
2021–22	RW	Kiira Yrjänen^ (2)	Kiekko-Espoo	Matilda Nilsson^ (6)	IFK Helsinki
2022–23	G	Emilia Kyrkkö (1)	Team Kuortane	Tiina Ranne^ (3)	KalPa Kuopio
2022–23	D	Sanni Rantala (2)	KalPa Kuopio	Elli Suoranta^ (1)	Ilves Tampere
2022–23	D	Siiri Yrjölä (1)	IFK Helsinki	Adalmiina Makkonen^ (1)	KalPa Kuopio
2022–23	LW	**Elisa Holopainen** (6)	KalPa Kuopio	Jenna Kaila (1)	KalPa Kuopio
2022–23	C	Michaela Pejzlová (3)	IFK Helsinki	Oona Havana (1)	Kärpät Oulu
2022–23	RW	Julia Liikala (1)	IFK Helsinki	Emilia Vesa (2)	IFK Helsinki
2023–24	G	Olivia Last (1)	TPS Turku	Kerttu Kuja-Halkola^ (1)	Team Kuortane
2023–24	D	Sanni Rantala (3)	KalPa Kuopio	Oona Koukkula (2)	HPK Hämeenlinna
2023–24	D	Siiri Yrjölä (2)	IFK Helsinki	Minttu Tuominen (6)	Kiekko-Espoo
2023–24	LW	**Elisa Holopainen** (7)	KalPa Kuopio	Emma Ekoluoma^ (1)	Kärpät Oulu
2023–24	C	Michaela Pejzlová (4)	IFK Helsinki	Lisette Täks^ (1)	Kiekko-Espoo
2023–24	RW	Emma Nuutinen (3)	Kiekko-Espoo	Julia Liikala (2)	IFK Helsinki
2024–25	G	Salla Sivula (1)	KalPa Kuopio	Tiina Ranne^ (4)	TPS Turku
2024–25	D	Minttu Tuominen (7)	Kiekko-Espoo	Elli Suoranta^ (2)	Ilves Tampere
2024–25	D	Tuuli Tallinen (1)	Team Kuortane	Ada Eronen (1)	Kiekko-Espoo
2024–25	LW	**Emma Nuutinen** (4)	Kiekko-Espoo	Anni Pere^ (1)	IFK Helsinki
2024–25	C	Lisette Täks^ (2)	Kiekko-Espoo	Kiti Seikkula^ (1)	HPK Hämeenlinna
2024–25	RW	Barbora Juříčková (1)	HPK Hämeenlinna	Emma Ekoluoma^ (2)	Ilves Tampere
2025–26	G	Anni Keisala (5)	HPK Hämeenlinna	—N/a	
2025–26	D	Ada Eronen (2)	Kiekko-Espoo	—N/a	
2025–26	D	Elli Suoranta^ (3)	Ilves Tampere	—N/a	
2025–26	LW	Emmi Juusela (1)	IFK Helsinki	—N/a	
2025–26	C	Pauliina Salonen (1)	IFK Helsinki	—N/a	
2025–26	RW	**Emma Nuutinen** (5)	Kiekko-Espoo	—N/a	

== Most selections ==
The following table only lists players with at least three total selections.

^	Denotes player active in the 2026–27 Auroraliiga season
*	Denotes player inducted to the Finnish Hockey Hall of Fame

Player	Pos	Total	First team	Second team	Player of the Year	Seasons
Linda Väilimäki	C	8	7	1	1	16
Elisa Holopainen	LW	7	6	1	4	7
Minttu Tuominen	D	7	6	1	0	12
Jenni Hiirikoski	D	6	6	0	5	14
Anne Helin	LW	6	6	0	1	14
Matilda Nilsson^	RW	6	3	3	0	9
Annina Rajahuhta	RW	5	5	0	0	15
Anni Keisala	G	5	5	0	1	11
Nelli Laitinen	D	4	4	0	0	6
Emma Nuutinen	RW	5	5	0	2	10
Michaela Pejzlová	C	4	2	2	0	4
Isa Rahunen	D	4	2	2	1	11
Tiina Ranne^	G	4	0	4	0	15
Mira Jalosuo	D	3	3	0	0	7
Anna Kilponen	D	3	3	0	0	9
Tanja Niskanen	C	3	3	0	1	12
Sanni Rantala	D	3	3	0	0	7
Meeri Räisänen	G	3	3	0	0	10
Elli Suoranta^	D	3	1	2	0	9
