= Päivi Halonen Award =

Finnish ice hockey award

Päivi Halonen Award Päivi Halonen -palkinto (Finnish)
- Sport: Ice hockey
- League: Auroraliiga
- Awarded for: Best defenseman
- Presented by: Finnish Ice Hockey Association

History
- Most wins: Jenni Hiirikoski (5)
- Most recent: Elli Suoranta, 2026

The Päivi Halonen Award (Finnish: Päivi Halonen -palkinto) is an ice hockey trophy awarded seasonally by the Finnish Ice Hockey Association to the best defenseman in the Auroraliiga (known as Naisten SM-sarja during 1982 to 2017 and as Naisten Liiga during 2017 to 2024). It is named after Päivi Virta, previously Halonen, former SM-sarja defender and trailblazer for women's ice hockey in Finland, who won fifteen Finnish Championship titles during her career, four more than any other player in league history.

== Award winners ==
Season	Winner	Team
2005–06	Heidi Pelttari	Ilves Tampere
2006–07	Saija Tarkki	Kärpät Oulu
2007–08	Jenni Hiirikoski	Espoo Blues
2008–09	Emma Laaksonen	Espoo Blues
2009–10	Emma Laaksonen	Espoo Blues
2010–11	Emma Terho	Espoo Blues
2011–12	Saija Tarkki	Kärpät Oulu
2012–13	Jenni Hiirikoski	JYP Jyväskylä
2013–14	Jenni Hiirikoski	JYP Jyväskylä
2014–15	Jenni Hiirikoski	JYP Jyväskylä
2015–16	Jenni Hiirikoski	JYP Jyväskylä
2016–17	Isa Rahunen	Kärpät Oulu
2017–18	Isa Rahunen	Kärpät Oulu
2018–19	Minttu Tuominen	Espoo Blues
2019–20	Nelli Laitinen	Kiekko-Espoo
2020–21	Nelli Laitinen	Kiekko-Espoo
2021–22	Nelli Laitinen	Kiekko-Espoo
2022–23	Siiri Yrjölä	IFK Helsinki
2023–24	Siiri Yrjölä	IFK Helsinki
2024–25	Minttu Tuominen	Kiekko-Espoo
2025–26	Elli Suoranta	Ilves Tampere

Source: Elite Prospects

== All-time award recipients ==
Player	Wins	Year(s) won
Jenni Hiirikoski	5	2008, 2013, 2014, 2015, 2016
Nelli Laitinen	3	2020, 2021, 2022
Emma Terho née Laaksonen	3	2009, 2010, 2011
Isa Rahunen	2	2017, 2018
Saija Tarkki	2	2007, 2012
Minttu Tuominen	2	2019, 2025
Siiri Yrjölä	2	2023, 2024
Heidi Pelttari	1	2006
Elli Suoranta	1	2026
