= Jenna Suokko =

Finnish ice hockey player (born 1995

- Born: 14 June 1995 (age 31) Tampere, Finland
- Height: 157 cm (5 ft 2 in)
- Weight: 55 kg (121 lb; 8 st 9 lb)
- Position: Left wing
- Shoots: Left
- WCIHL team Former teams: Shenzhen KRS: HC Fribourg-Gottéron; SC Bern; Buffalo Beauts; Ilves Tampere; Leksands IF; Team Kuortane
- National team: Finland
- Playing career: 2010–present

Jenna Suokko (born 14 June 1995) is a Finnish ice hockey player, a left winger. She has played in the Chinese Women's Ice Hockey League (WCIHL) with Shenzhen KRS since 2026.

Suokko has previously played in the Swiss Women's League (PFHL), the North American Premier Hockey Federation (PHF), the Swedish Women's Hockey League (SDHL), and the Finnish Naisten Liiga (NSML).

== Playing career ==
At age 15, Suokko made her debut in the Naisten SM-sarja (NSMs; renamed Naisten Liiga in 2017 and Auroraliiga in 2024), the premier women's ice hockey league in Finland, with the Tampereen Ilves Naiset in the 2010–11 season. She remained with the team the following season, winning Aurora Borealis Cup silver medals in 2011 and again in 2012. Ilves won the IIHF European Women's Champions Cup (EWCC) in 2011 – the only Finnish team to ever win the tournament – and Suokko recorded a goal against SKIF Nizhny Novgorod in the round-robin finals. Suokko's teammates from the 2011 EWCC Champion roster included Anna Kilponen, Sari Kärnä, Rosa Lindstedt, Saara Niemi (née Tuominen), Heidi Pelttari, and Mari Saarinen.

In 2012, Suokko joined Team Oriflame Kuortane, where she reunited with former Ilves teammate Anna Kilponen and joined a roster of rising stars in Finnish women's ice hockey, including Suvi Ollikainen, Tiina Ranne, Vilma Tanskanen, Saana Valkama, and Ella Viitasuo. Team Kuortane won the U20 SM-turnaus ('Under-20 Finnish Championship tournament') in 2013 and 2014, but struggled in Naisten SM-sarja regular season play and were forced to save themselves from relegation to the Naisten Mestis in the 2013–14 postseason.

Suokko returned to Ilves for the 2014–15 season and won Finnish Championship bronze. In the 2015–16 season, she played two games with Team Kuortane before enrolling at Olds College in Olds, Alberta, Canada and joining the Olds College Broncos women's ice hockey program of the Alberta Colleges Athletics Conference (ACAC). She led the team in scoring, with 8 goals and 4 assists for 12 points in 22 games, and was honoured as the 2015–16 ACAC Women's Hockey Rookie of the Year.

The following season, Suokko signed with Leksands IF of the Swedish Women's Hockey League (SDHL). She tallied 5 goals and a team-leading 37 penalty minutes (PIM) in the 36-game 2016–17 SDHL season.

After playing two seasons abroad, she returned to Finland in 2017 to begin university studies and to play with Ilves Tampere. The move quickly paid off and Ilves won Aurora Borealis Cup silver medals in 2017–18 and 2018–19. Suokko developed from seventh ranked for team scoring in the 2017–18 season to third in 2018–19 (behind only Linda Leppänen (née Välimäki) and Riikka Noronen) to the team's top scorer in the 2019–20 and 2020–21 seasons. She served as an alternate captain, along with Reetu Kulhua, Jenna Lehtiniemi, and Helen Puputti, in the leadership group of captain Anna Kilponen during the 2020–21 season and was named to the 2021 Naisten Liiga All-Star Team II.

At the conclusion of the 2020–21 season, Suokko had played 249 regular season games in the Naisten Liiga and amassed 116 goals and 107 assists for 223 points, a career average of 0.90 points per game.

On 4 August 2021, Suokko signed a one-year contract with the Buffalo Beauts of the Premier Hockey Federatiom (PHF). She was the second Finn to play in the league and the first since the collapse of the Canadian Women's Hockey League (CWHL) and founding of the Professional Women's Hockey Players Association (PWHPA); the first Finn to play in the PHF (then called the NWHL) was goaltender Meeri Räisänen, who played with the Connecticut Whale in the 2018–19 season.

== International play ==
Suokko was a member of the Finnish national under-18 team during 2010 to 2013 and represented Finland at the IIHF Women's World U18 Championships (WW18) in 2011, 2012, and 2013. At the 2011 tournament, Finland beat Switzerland in the bronze medal match to earn its first U18 Worlds medal.

At the senior level, Suokko has played with the Finnish national under-22 team (also called the Finland National Development Team) and the Finnish national team, first in August 2014. She represented Finland at the Nations Cup in 2016 and won silver after the team successfully pushed Canada to overtime in the gold medal match. As of August 2021, Suokko has played 17 international matches with the Finnish national team but has not been selected to represent Finland at the IIHF Women's World Championship or Olympic Games.

== Personal life ==
Suokko has a bachelor's degree in nursing from Tampere University of Applied Sciences and has worked as a hemodialysis nurse.

== Career statistics ==
=== Regular season and playoffs ===
			Regular season					Postseason
Season	Team	League	GP	G	A	Pts	PIM	GP	G	A	Pts	PIM
2010-11	Ilves	NSMs	26	7	9	16	26	9	2	1	3	6
2011-12	Ilves	NSMs	31	18	13	31	26	8	2	0	2	2
2012-13	Team Oriflame	NSMs	28	11	8	19	32	3	1	1	2	22
2013-14	Team Oriflame	NSMs	28	11	4	15	38	10*	16*	9*	25*	8*
2014-15	Ilves	NSMs	23	9	7	16	24	9	2	1	3	12
2015-16	Team Kuortane	NSMs	2	0	0	0	4	–	–	–	–	–
2015-16	Olds College Broncos	ACAC	22	8	4	12	16	–	–	–	–	–
2016-17	Leksands IF	SDHL	36	5	0	5	37	2	0	0	0	2
2017-18	Ilves	NSML	30	7	13	20	24	7	0	1	1	4
2018-19	Ilves	NSML	26	18	20	38	14	4	0	1	1	2
2019-20	Ilves	NSML	27	13	19	32	16	3	0	0	0	8
2020-21	Ilves	NSML	28	22	14	36	28	7	2	1	3	4
2021-22	Buffalo Beauts	PHF	18	2	5	7	4	1	0	0	0	0
2022-23	Buffalo Beauts	PHF	24	2	2	4	12	–	–	–	–	–
2023-24	SC Bern	SWHL A	27	16	26	32	37	8	2	2	4	2
Naisten Liiga totals			249	116	107	223	232	50	9	6	15	60
PHF totals			42	4	7	11	16	1	0	0	0	0

* Postseason results for the 2013–14 season are from the qualification series (Finnish: Karsintasarja) rather than the playoffs and are not calculated with playoff totals.
