= 2024–25 Auroraliiga season =

42nd ice hockey season of the Auroraliiga

- League: Auroraliiga
- Sport: Ice hockey
- Defending champions: IFK Helsinki (2023–24)
- Duration: 6 September 2024 – 16 February 2025; Playoffs; 22 February – 30 March 2025; Qualification; 15 March – 29 March 2025
- Games: 32
- Teams: 9
- Total attendance: 13672 (93.2 per game)
- TV partner: MTV Sub
- Streaming partner(s): MTV Katsomo; Leijonat.tv

Regular season
- Season champions: Kiekko-Espoo
- Runners-up: HPK Hämeenlinna
- Season MVP: (Finland) Emma Nuutinen (K-Espoo)
- Top scorer: (Finland) Emma Nuutinen (K-Espoo)

Aurora Borealis Cup playoffs
- Aurora Borealis Cup playoffs MVP: (Finland) Minttu Tuominen (K-Espoo)
- Finals champions: Kiekko-Espoo
- Runners-up: HPK Hämeenlinna

Seasons
- ← 2023–24 2025–26 →

The 2024–25 Auroraliiga season was the 42nd ice hockey season of the Auroraliiga. It was the first season since the league re-branded to Auroraliiga from Naisten Liiga, the name that had been in use since 2017. The regular season began on 6 September 2024 and concluded on 16 February 2025. The 2025 Aurora Borealis Cup playoffs began on 22 February and concluded on 29 March.

Kiekko-Espoo were the Aurora Borealis Cup champions, claiming the franchise's seventeenth Finnish Championship title. Kiekko-Espoo also won the 2024–25 regular season title to continue their reign from the 2023–24 regular season.

== League changes ==
=== League rebrand ===
Founded in 1982 as the Naisten SM-sarja and known as the Naisten Liiga (NSML) since 2017, the league announced it had rebranded as Auroraliiga on 15 August 2024. Announcing the name change, league director Henni Laaksonen emphasized, "it is high time to play ice hockey without prefixes" – referring to the intentional move away from using "women's [ice hockey]" (Finnish: naisten [jääkiekko]) in the new branding – and outlined the league's goal to develop into a top international league that will enable its players to experience the everyday life of professional athletes.

The rebranding included a new wordmark and a black-and-green color scheme.

=== Postseason format ===
Adjustments to the Auroraliiga postseason format were approved by the Finnish Ice Hockey Association in May 2024 and included extending the playoff semifinals and finals from best-of-five to best-of-seven series.

The league qualifiers will be a best-of-five series played by the last place (i.e. ninth ranked) team of the Auroraliiga and the winner of the Naisten Mestis playoffs, regardless of the teams.

=== Coaching changes ===
Team	Previous coach	New coach	Details
KalPa	Mika Väärälä	Artturi Rouhiainen	Väärälä announced he would not continue as head coach of KalPa on 17 March 2024, a day after successfully coaching the team to its second consecutive Finnish Championship bronze medal. Specifics regarding his departure were not reported, however the relationship between the club and coach appeared amicable and he wished the team much success in the future. Väärälä was later appointed associate coach of HK Budapest as the team moved from the European Women's Hockey League (EWHL) to the German Women's Ice Hockey League (DFEL) ahead of the 2024–25 season. Rouhiainen was announced as the new head coach of KalPa on 20 March 2024. The 29-year old spent the 2023–24 season as head coach of KalPa's girls' under-15 team and associate head coach of the girls' under-16 team, while finishing a degree in physical education.
Kärpät	Satu Kiipeli	Teemu Koivula	After starting the 2023–24 season as an assistant coach with Kärpät, Kiipeli took on head coaching duties in October 2023 following the resignation of head coach Sanna Lankosaari earlier that month. The team achieved a 9-23 win–loss record on the season and were swept in the quarterfinals of the 2024 playoffs by eventual Aurora Borealis Cup champions HIFK. Koivula was head coach of RoKi during the 2023–24 season, in which the team finished at the bottom of the Naisten Liiga standings. He was announced as the new head coach of Kärpät on 27 March 2024 and, at the same time, it was confirmed that Kiipeli would remain with the team and return to her previous role as assistant coach.
RoKi	Teemu Koivula	Oona Parviainen	

=== Player movements ===
Note: This section does not record all player signings. It is generally limited to player movements involving national team players from any country, international import players, and extra-league signings. Player nationality displayed is limited to primary nation of IIHF eligibility; some players may hold citizenship in more than one country.

Player	Nat	Previous team	2024–25 team	ref.
Incoming players
Lea Glosíková (F)	(Slovakia)	Hoosac Owls (NEPSAC)	TPS Turku	
Manuela Heidenberger (F)	(Italy)	EV Bozen Eagles (EWHL/IHLW)	HPK Hämeenlinna	
Anni Keisala (G)	(Finland)	HV71 (SDHL)	HPK Hämeenlinna	
Peppi Kähkönen (F)	(Finland)	Hamline Pipers (NCAA D3)	TPS Turku	
Anni Montonen (F)	(Finland)	HV71 (SDHL)	Kiekko-Espoo	
Matilda Nilsson (F)	(Finland)	Frölunda HC (SDHL)	Ilves Tampere	
Kokoro Ota (D)	(Japan)	Seibu Princess Rabbits (WJIHL)	KalPa Kuopio	
Intra-league transfers
Tiina Ranne (G)	(Finland)	KalPa Kuopio	TPS Turku	
Karoliina Rantamäki (F)	(Finland)	IFK Helsinki	Kiekko-Espoo	
Mikaela Saukkonen (D)	(Finland)	IFK Helsinki	HPK Hämeenlinna	
Peppi Virtanen (F)	(Finland)	Team Kuortane	HPK Hämeenlinna	
Departing players
Kati Asikainen (G)	(Finland)	Kärpät Oulu	HC Fribourg-Gottéron (SWHL A)	
Oona Havana (F)	(Finland)	Kärpät Oulu	Vermont Catamounts (NCAA D1)	
Elisa Holopainen (F)	(Finland)	KalPa Kuopio	Frölunda HC (SDHL)	
Eliška Hotová (F)	(Czech Republic)	TPS Turku	HC Příbram (Extraliga žen)	
Liisa Kastikainen (F)	(Finland)	KalPa Kuopio	Örebro HK (NDHL)	
Oona Koukkula (D)	(Finland)	HPK Hämeenlinna	Brynäs IF (SDHL)	
Jenniina Kuoppala (D)	(Finland)	Team Kuortane	Örebro HK (NDHL)	
Emilia Kyrkkö (G)	(Finland)	Team Kuortane	St. Cloud State Huskies (NCAA D1)	
Kiia Lahtinen (G)	(Finland)	IFK Helsinki	Maine Black Bears (NCAA D1)	
Olivia Last (G)	(Australia)	TPS Turku	St. Olaf Oles (NCAA D3)	
Julia Liikala (F)	(Finland)	IFK Helsinki	HC Ambrì-Piotta Girls (SWHL A)	
Nenna Mehtonen (D)	(Finland)	IFK Helsinki	Örebro HK (NDHL)	
Michaela Pejzlová (F)	(Czech Republic)	IFK Helsinki	HC Ambrì-Piotta Girls (SWHL A)	
Sanni Rantala (D)	(Finland)	KalPa Kuopio	Frölunda HC (SDHL)	
Clara Rozier (F)	(France)	IFK Helsinki	SC Bern (SWHL A)	
Kassidy Sauvé (G)	(Canada)	HPK Hämeenlinna	SDE Hockey (SDHL)	
Julia Schalin (F)	(Finland)	Kiekko-Espoo	Mercyhurst Lakers (NCAA D1)	
Sanni Vanhanen (F)	(Finland)	IFK Helsinki	Brynäs IF (SDHL)	
Siiri Yrjölä (D)	(Finland)	IFK Helsinki	St. Cloud State Huskies (NCAA D1)	
Julia Zielińska (F)	(Poland)	Kiekko-Espoo	Bemidji State Beavers (NCAA D1)	

== Teams ==
Location of teams in the Naisten Liiga

Team	Location	Home venue	Head coach	Captain
HIFK	Helsinki	Pirkkolan jäähalli	Saara Niemi	Athéna Locatelli
HPK	Hämeenlinna	Jääliikuntakeskus Hakio	Jari Risku	Heta Seikkula
Ilves	Tampere	Tesoman jäähalli	Marjo Voutilainen	Jenna Lehtiniemi
KalPa	Kuopio	Niiralan Monttu	Artturi Rouhiainen	Johanna Juutilainen
Kiekko-Espoo	Espoo	Tapiolan harjoitusareena	Sami Haapanen	Reetta Valkjärvi
Kärpät	Oulu	Raksilan jäähalli	Teemu Koivula	Aino Kaijankoski
RoKi	Rovaniemi	Lappi Areena	Oona Parviainen	Viivi Iso-Kouvola
Team Kuortane	Kuortane	Kuortaneen jäähalli	Juuso Nieminen	Kerttu Lehmus
TPS	Turku	Kupittaan jäähalli	Terhi Mertanen	Pihla Hämeenniemi

== Preseason ==
The preseason began on 9 August 2024 and comprised exhibition games played between Auroraliiga teams or between an Auroraliiga team and a boys' junior team from the youth department of the same club or a local club. The Regina Cougars women's ice hockey team from the University of Regina in Regina, Saskatchewan, Canada played three exhibition matches – against Ilves, HIFK, and HPK, respectively – during the Auroraliiga preseason. No exhibition matches were scheduled for RoKi.

=== Schedule ===
Exhibition games
Date	Home	Score	Visitor	OT	Attn	Notes	Recap
9 August	HIFK	3–5	HIFK U16 II		49		
10 August	TPS	4–6	Ilves		30		
10 August	Kärpät	1–4	Kärpät U15 Valkoinen		80		
10 August	HPK	4–3	K-Espoo		60		
11 August	Ilves	8–3	TPS		49	Hat-trick by Noora Mylläri	
11 August	K-Espoo	6–0	HPK		70	Shutout recorded by Tiia Pajarinen	
15 August	Kuortane	20–0	S-Kiekko U14 Musta		20	Hat-trick by Raili Mustonen; Hat-trick by Tuuli Tallinen; Shutout recorded by Minttu Kataja	
16 August	Ilves	5–0	Regina Cougars				
16 August	KalPa	3–3	KalPa U16 Ak	SO	28		
17 August	TPS	3–3	HPK	SO	50		
17 August	HIFK	8–2	Warriors U16		32		
17 August	Ilves	2–7	K-Espoo		55		
18 August	HIFK	2–0	Regina Cougars				
18 August	K-Espoo	6–1	Ilves		60	Hat-trick by Lisette Täks	
20 August	HPK	1–3	Regina Cougars				
23 August	TPS	3–4	K-Espoo				
24 August	HPK	7–2	Ilves		80		
24 August	K-Espoo	6–0	TPS		60	Hat-trick by Nea Koskipalo; Shutout recorded by Lilli Packalen	
25 August	HIFK	0–7	HIFK U15 AAA		61	Shutout recorded by Onni Tennberg	
25 August	Ilves	3–2	HPK		70		
29 August	Kuortane	2–5	S-Kiekko U15 Sininen		20		
30 August	KalPa	3–1	KalPa U16 Ak		30		

== Regular season ==
The regular season began on Friday, 6 September 2024. The season opening weekend was hosted in Turku, with eight of nine games played at Turkuhalli and the Sunday match between Team Kuortane and HPK played at Kupittaan jäähalli.

=== Standings ===
Pos	Team	Pld	W	OTW	OTL	L	GF	GA	GD	Pts	Postseason
1	Kiekko-Espoo	32	26	3	0	3	168	56	+112	84	Playoffs
2	HPK	32	22	1	3	6	133	71	+62	71	Playoffs
3	Team Kuortane	32	19	3	2	8	115	67	+48	65	Playoffs
4	IFK Helsinki	32	20	1	2	9	113	81	+32	64	Playoffs
5	Tampereen Ilves	32	16	2	1	13	118	99	+19	53	Playoffs
6	KalPa	32	10	3	4	15	81	87	−6	40	Playoffs
7	TPS	32	9	3	3	17	66	99	−33	36	Playoffs
8	Oulun Kärpät	32	5	0	0	27	48	128	−80	15	Playoffs
9	RoKi	32	1	0	1	30	46	200	−154	4	Qualification

Updated to match(es) played on 16 February 2025. Source: Leijonat

=== Results ===
2024–25 regular season

September
Date	Home	Score	Visitor	OT	Attn	Notes	Recap
6 September	TPS	1–7	K-Espoo		225		
7 September	K-Espoo	7–2	Ilves		90	Hat-trick by Lisette Täks (1)	
7 September	HIFK	2–1	Kärpät		121		
7 September	HPK	3–1	RoKi		119		
7 September	Kuortane	1–0	KalPa		80	Shutout recorded by Kerttu Kuja-Halkola (1)	
8 September	HIFK	5–1	RoKi		80		
8 September	TPS	0–1	Kärpät		167	Shutout recorded by Emilia Piekkari (1)	
8 September	Kuortane	2–5	HPK		50		
8 September	Ilves	4–3	KalPa		73	Hat-trick by Matilda Nilsson (1)	
13 September	KalPa	2–3	Kuortane	OT	71		
14 September	TPS	2–1	HPK	GWS	67	Shootout lasted 22 rounds. Emmi Metsä-Tokila scored the only goal of the shootout on the 43rd attempt	
14 September	RoKi	1–5	K-Espoo		70		
14 September	Kärpät	3–4	Ilves		232		
14 September	KalPa	1–3	HIFK		72		
15 September	RoKi	3–7	Ilves		78	Hat-trick by Emma Ekoluoma (1)	
15 September	Kuortane	3–0	HIFK		40	Shutout recorded by Lilia Huovinen (1)	
15 September	HPK	2–1	TPS		90		
15 September	Kärpät	1–4	K-Espoo		151		
21 September	HPK	10–0	Kärpät		50	Shutout recorded by Anni Keisala (1)	
21 September	HIFK	3–6	K-Espoo		201		
21 September	Ilves	7–1	KalPa		90		
21 September	Kuortane	5–1	RoKi		40		
22 September	K-Espoo	9–0	Kärpät		115	Hat-trick by Lisette Täks (2); Shutout recorded by Minja Drufva (1)	
22 September	KalPa	4–0	RoKi		100	Shutout recorded by Salla Sivula (1)	
22 September	Ilves	4–2	Kuortane		70		
22 September	TPS	5–4	HIFK	GWS	60		
28 September	RoKi	1–10	HIFK		53	Hat-trick by Anni Pere (1)	
28 September	Kärpät	3–6	HPK		105	Hat-trick by Barbora Juříčková (1)	
28 September	Ilves	4–0	TPS		50	Shutout recorded by Neea Pohjamo (1)	
28 September	KalPa	2–3	Kuortane	GWS	70		
29 September	RoKi	2–4	HPK		89		
29 September	Kuortane	2–3	Ilves		60		
29 September	KalPa	3–1	K-Espoo		64		
29 September	Kärpät	1–4	HIFK		108		
	34 games played 202 goals scored			1 OT 3 GWS	3201	6 hat-tricks 7 shutouts	

October
Date	Home	Score	Visitor	OT	Attn	Notes	Recap
5 October	KalPa	2–0	Kärpät		68	Shutout recorded by Salla Sivula (2)	
5 October	HIFK	1–2	Ilves	GWS	88		
5 October	TPS	3–4	Kuortane		70		
5 October	K-Espoo	10–2	RoKi		92		
6 October	TPS	4–0	RoKi		50	Shutout recorded by Emmi Laitajärvi (1)	
6 October	HPK	2–3	Kuortane	GWS	100		
6 October	KalPa	2–5	Ilves		102		
12 October	RoKi	2–10	TPS		79		
12 October	Ilves	2–3	HPK	OT	120		
12 October	Kuortane	3–5	HIFK		70		
12 October	KalPa	2–3	K-Espoo		75		
13 October	HPK	5–2	Ilves		100		
13 October	KalPa	1–6	HIFK		67		
13 October	Kärpät	0–2	TPS		152	Shutout recorded by Tiina Ranne (1)	
13 October	Kuortane	1–2	K-Espoo	GWS	80		
18 October	K-Espoo	5–1	HPK		132		
18 October	HIFK	2–1	TPS	GWS	120		
19 October	Ilves	6–3	RoKi		85		
19 October	Kuortane	2–1	Kärpät		40		
19 October	TPS	5–2	KalPa		70		
20 October	Ilves	6–2	Kärpät		70		
20 October	K-Espoo	4–1	HIFK		184		
20 October	HPK	2–3	KalPa	GWS	170		
20 October	Kuortane	9–1	RoKi		70		
25 October	Ilves	2–9	K-Espoo		45		
26 October	RoKi	2–9	HPK		68		
26 October	Kärpät	3–5	KalPa		132		
26 October	TPS	1–6	Ilves		70	Hat-trick by Noora Mylläri (1)	
26 October	K-Espoo	4–3	Kuortane	OT	100		
27 October	RoKi	1–3	KalPa		55		
27 October	HIFK	3–1	TPS		106		
27 October	Kärpät	1–2	HPK		197		
	32 games played 181 goals scored			2 OT 5 GWS	2628	1 hat-trick 3 shutouts	

November
Date	Home	Score	Visitor	OT	Attn	Notes	Recap
1 November	Ilves	2–4	HIFK		60		
2 November	Kärpät	5–1	RoKi		153		
2 November	HPK	2–5	HIFK		60		
2 November	Ilves	4–8	K-Espoo		40	Hat-trick by Emma Nuutinen (1)	
2 November	Kuortane	4–1	TPS		50		
3 November	K-Espoo	6–3	Kuortane		105		
3 November	KalPa	1–2	TPS		77		
3 November	Kärpät	5–3	RoKi		144	Hat-trick by Sari Wäänänen (1)	
16 November	HPK	11–3	RoKi		50		
16 November	Ilves	1–3	Kuortane		65		
16 November	HIFK	5–1	Kärpät		88		
16 November	K-Espoo	6–3	KalPa		215	Hat-trick by Emma Nuutinen (2)	
17 November	TPS	2–5	RoKi		59	Hat-trick by Susanna Järvenpää (1)	
17 November	K-Espoo	6–0	Kärpät		97	Shutout recorded by Minja Drufva (2)	
17 November	HPK	5–2	Kuortane		60		
17 November	HIFK	5–4	KalPa		146		
23 November	Kärpät	2–6	Ilves		520		
23 November	RoKi	1–11	K-Espoo		42	Hat-trick by Anni Montonen (1)	
23 November	TPS	0–1	KalPa	OT	70	Shutout recorded by Suvi Saarinen (1); Shutout recorded by Salla Sivula (3)	
23 November	HIFK	2–4	HPK		80		
24 November	RoKi	2–4	Ilves		41		
24 November	HPK	4–1	KalPa		90		
24 November	Kärpät	3–8	K-Espoo		105		
24 November	TPS	0–4	Kuortane		60	Shutout recorded by Kerttu Kuja-Halkola (2)	
28 November	HPK	3–4	K-Espoo		60		
29 November	K-Espoo	7–1	TPS		124	Hat-trick by Lisette Täks (3)	
30 November	Kärpät	2–4	HIFK		102		
30 November	RoKi	1–9	Kuortane		52	Hat-trick by Raili Mustonen (1)	
30 November	KalPa	5–0	Ilves		61	Shutout recorded by Salla Sivula (4)	
	29 games played 207 goals scored			1 OT 0 GWS	2876	7 hat-tricks 5 shutouts	

December
Date	Home	Score	Visitor	OT	Attn	Notes	Recap
1 December	RoKi	1–7	HIFK		41		
1 December	KalPa	4–2	HPK		57		
1 December	TPS	1–3	Ilves		47		
1 December	Kärpät	0–5	Kuortane		105	Shutout recorded by Kerttu Kuja-Halkola (3)	
7 December	RoKi	0–5	Kärpät		55	Shutout recorded by Emilia Piekkari (2)	
7 December	HIFK	2–4	Kuortane		77		
7 December	K-Espoo	1–4	HPK		95		
7 December	KalPa	3–4	TPS	SO	73		
8 December	HIFK	2–3	K-Espoo	OT	93		
8 December	Kuortane	4–0	TPS		50	Shutout recorded by Lilia Huovinen (2)	
8 December	Ilves	0–2	HPK		70	Shutout recorded by Anni Keisala (2)	
12 December	Ilves	2–1	TPS	SO	60		
21 December	TPS	2–1	Kärpät		140		
21 December	HIFK	3–1	KalPa		72		
21 December	Kuortane	2–3	HPK		60		
21 December	K-Espoo	5–0	RoKi		83	Shutout recorded by Tiia Pajarinen (1)	
22 December	HIFK	6–0	RoKi		78	Shutout recorded by Nelli Nieminen (1)	
22 December	K-Espoo	3–2	KalPa	SO	121		
22 December	HPK	8–0	Kärpät		100	Shutout recorded by Janika Järvikari (1)	
	19 games played 96 goals scored			1 OT 3 GWS	1436	0 hat-tricks 7 shutouts	

January
Date	Home	Score	Visitor	OT	Attn	Notes	Recap
18 January	KalPa	4–1	Kärpät		75		
18 January	RoKi	1–2	TPS		54		
18 January	HPK	2–3	HIFK		80		
18 January	Kuortane	6–2	Ilves		60		
19 January	HIFK	5–4	Ilves		109	Hat-trick by Linnea Melotindos (1)	
19 January	Kuortane	1–4	K-Espoo		50		
19 January	Kärpät	0–2	TPS		121	Shutout recorded by Tiina Ranne (2)	
19 January	KalPa	1–2	HPK		115		
25 January	RoKi	3–8	KalPa		40		
25 January	Ilves	3–5	HIFK		400	Played at Nokia Arena	
25 January	TPS	1–4	HPK		89		
25 January	Kärpät	2–5	Kuortane		107		
26 January	RoKi	1–7	Kuortane		37		
26 January	HPK	2–4	K-Espoo		300		
26 January	Kärpät	1–3	KalPa		125		
31 January	HPK	5–3	Ilves		60		
	16 games played 97 goals scored			0 OT 0 GWS	1822	1 hat-trick 1 shutout	

February
Date	Home	Score	Visitor	OT	Attn	Notes	Recap
1 February	RoKi	0–3	Kärpät		64	Shutout recorded by Kati Asikainen (1)	
1 February	Kuortane	2–1	KalPa		50		
1 February	K-Espoo	2–1	Ilves		113		
1 February	HIFK	2–4	HPK		658	Played at Helsingin jäähalli	
2 February	K-Espoo	5–2	TPS		106	Karoliina Rantamäki became the first player to reach 400 goals in league history	
14 February	K-Espoo	5–0	HIFK		170	Shutout recorded by Tiia Pajarinen (2)	
15 February	Ilves	13–1	RoKi		120		
15 February	Kuortane	4–0	Kärpät		40	Shutout recorded by Lillia Huovinen (3)	
15 February	HPK	11–4	TPS		60		
16 February	Ilves	4–0	Kärpät		60	Shutout recorded by Melisa Mörönen (1)	
16 February	KalPa	3–2	RoKi	OT	100		
16 February	TPS	3–2	K-Espoo		79		
16 February	HIFK	3–4	Kuortane		89		
	13 games played 81 goals scored			1 OT 0 GWS	1709	0 hat-tricks 4 shutouts	

=== Player statistics ===
==== Scoring leaders ====
The following players led the league in points at the conclusion of the regular season on 16 February 2025.

Player	Team	GP	G	A	Pts	PIM
Emma Nuutinen	K-Espoo	30	27	38	65	8
Kiti Seikkula	HPK	32	29	30	59	10
Lisette Täks	K-Espoo	32	30	25	55	30
Barbora Juříčková	HPK	32	21	34	55	12
Minttu Tuominen	K-Espoo	30	14	35	49	6
Matilda Nilsson	Ilves	32	23	20	43	16
Ada Eronen	K-Espoo	31	6	31	37	26
Sofia Kari	Kuortane	32	19	15	34	22
Pauliina Salonen	HIFK	32	16	18	34	22
Anni Pere	HIFK	32	16	17	33	14
Emma Ekoluoma	Ilves	32	16	17	33	20
Karoliina Rantamäki	K-Espoo	20	13	20	33	16
Emmi Juusela	HIFK	32	7	26	33	12
Anni Montonen	K-Espoo	32	13	18	31	2
Noora Mylläri	Ilves	23	13	17	30	20
Aliisa Toivonen	K-Espoo	32	13	17	30	33
Raili Mustonen	Kuortane	31	17	11	28	6
Johanna Juutilainen	KalPa	30	13	14	27	10
Tilli Keränen	KalPa	24	9	18	27	8
Julia Kuusisto	Ilves	29	15	11	26	34

The following skaters were the top point scorers of teams not represented on the scoring leader table at the conclusion of the regular season on 16 February 2025, noted with their overall league scoring rank:

27. Eevi Ilvonen, TPS: 30 GP, 8 G, 17 A, 25 Pts, 14 PIM
32. Dominika Malicka, RoKi: 31 GP, 6 G, 16 A, 22 Pts, 6 PIM
48. Anna-Kaisa Antti-Roiko, Kärpät: 25 GP, 3 G, 13 A, 16 Pts, 16 PIM

==== Goaltenders ====
The following goaltenders had played at least one-third of their team's minutes in net at the conclusion of the regular season on 16 February 2025, sorted by save percentage.

Player	Team	GPI	TOI	W	L	SA	GA	SO	S%	GAA
Tiina Ranne	TPS	18	1040:52	6	8	599	31	2	94.8	1.79
Salla Sivula	KalPa	22	1298:49	8	11	781	43	4	94.5	1.99
Anni Keisala	HPK	23	1384:59	16	5	563	45	2	92.0	1.95
Tiia Pajarinen	K-Espoo	16	966:40	14	1	337	29	2	91.4	1.80
Kerttu Kuja-Halkola	Kuortane	20	1147:29	11	5	384	35	3	90.9	1.83
Minja Drufva	K-Espoo	16	962:28	13	2	297	28	2	90.6	1.75
Emilia Piekkari	Kärpät	18	1011:05	4	13	513	49	2	90.4	2.91
Miia Vainio	HIFK	23	1388:10	13	8	588	58	0	90.1	2.51
Neea Pohjamo	Ilves	19	1048:08	10	6	427	46	1	89.2	2.63
Lilia Huovinen	Kuortane	14	785:38	9	4	269	29	3	89.5	2.78
Annika Saastamoinen	RoKi	18	956:36	1	15	706	77	0	89.1	4.83
Melisa Mörönen	Ilves	15	814:33	5	8	371	46	1	87.6	3.39
Suvi Saarinen	TPS	11	619:42	1	8	348	44	0	87.4	4.26
Alexandra Väyrynen	RoKi	12	642:29	0	12	459	82	0	82.1	7.66

Top backups

The following five goaltenders had the best save percentages of those playing at least one game but less than one-third of their team's minutes in net at the conclusion of the regular season on 16 February 2025.

Player	Team	GPI	TOI	W	L	SA	GA	SO	S%	GAA
Nelli Nieminen	HIFK	6	358:36	5	1	117	10	1	91.5	1.67
Kati Asikainen	Kärpät	5	257:45	1	4	141	15	1	89.4	3.49
Emmi Laitajärvi	TPS	5	277:19	2	2	178	19	1	89.3	4.11
Aino Laitinen	KalPa	8	487:11	4	3	218	25	0	88.5	3.08
Tea Koljonen	HIFK	3	185:00	2	0	51	6	0	88.2	1.95

=== In-season player movements ===
Note: This section records all in-season player transactions. Player nationality indicates primary nation of IIHF eligibility; some players may hold multiple citizenship.

Player	Nat	Previous team	Joining team	Movement date	ref.
Incoming players
Emma Hall (F)	(Canada)	IF Björklöven (NDHL)	KalPa Kuopio	19 October 2024	
Susanna Järvenpää (F)	(Finland)	APV Alavus (N. Mestis)	RoKi Rovaniemi	13 November 2024	
Lucia Záborská (F)	(Slovakia)	TPS Turku (2023–24)	RoKi Rovaniemi	23 January 2025	
Intra-league transfers
Alexandra Mateičková (D)	(Slovakia)	RoKi Rovaniemi	Kärpät Oulu	31 December 2024	

==== Loans ====
Player	Nat	Signed team	Loaned team	Details
Saara Rintamaa (G)	(Finland)	PaRa/Lukko (N. Suomi-sarja)	TPS Turku	1-game loan, 23 November 2024

== Playoffs ==
As of 27 March 2025

Quarterfinals
1	Kiekko-Espoo	5	7	4	–	–	3
8	Kärpät Oulu	2	2	0	–	–	0
4	IFK Helsinki	4	2	2	1	2	2
5	Ilves Tampere	0	4	1	5	3	3
2	HPK Hämeenlinna	3	1	4	3	–	3
7	TPS Turku	0	4	1	0	–	1
3	Team Kuortane	5	3	1	2	–	3
6	KalPa Kuopio	0	1	2	0	–	1

Semifinals
Kiekko-Espoo	4	3	2	3	–	–	–	4
Ilves Tampere	0	1	1	2	–	–	–	0
HPK Hämeenlinna	1	4	4	2	1	–	–	4
Team Kuortane	2	2	2	1	1	–	–	1

Finals
1st place, gold medalist(s)	Kiekko-Espoo	2	0	1	2	3	–	–	4
2nd place, silver medalist(s)	HPK Hämeenlinna	1	2	0	0	2	–	–	1
Bronze medal game
3rd place, bronze medalist(s)	Ilves Tampere	4
4	Team Kuortane	1

== Qualification ==
=== Naisten Mestis playoffs ===
==== Bracket ====
As of 8 March 2025

Quarterfinals
4	Lukko/PaRa	4	2	–	2
5	KeuPa HT	1	1	–	0
3	KalPa Ak	2	3	–	2
6	HPK Akatemia	1	1	–	0

Semifinals
1	K-Espoo Ak	2	3	3	1
4	Lukko/PaRa	3	1	4	2
2	APV	3	4	–	2
3	KalPa Ak	2	3	–	0

Finals
2nd place, silver medalist(s)	APV	3	3	–	0
1st place, gold medalist(s)	Lukko/PaRa	4	4	–	2
Bronze medal game
3rd place, bronze medalist(s)	K-Espoo Ak	3
4th	KalPa Ak	2

=== Qualification games ===
The Auroraliiga qualification matches (Auroraliigan karsintaottelut) began on 15 March 2025 and concluded on 29 March. The qualification was played as a best-of-five series between Lukko/PaRa, winners of the Naisten Mestis playoffs, and RoKi, the lowest ranked team from the Auroraliiga regular season.

The series was pushed to five games but RoKi ultimately retained their place in Auroraliiga for the 2025–26 season.

==== Results ====
All times local, Eastern European Time (UTC+2)
Abbreviations:PP1 = Power play goal (+1 advantage); SH1 = Short handed goal (–1 advantage); EN = Empty net goal; EA = Extra attacker

15 March 2025; 12:30	RoKi Rovaniemi	1–3 (0–0, 1–0, 0–3)	Lukko/PaRa	Lappi Areena, Rovaniemi; Attendance: 45

Annika Saastamoinen
Goalies
Netta-Sisko Lahtinen
Referee:
Elias Klytseroff
Linesmen:
Atte Mathlin
Lauri Alamartin

Kalová (Záborská, Felcmanová) – PP1 – 30:19	1–0
	1–1	42:50 – PP1 – Kangasniemi (H. Sivula)
	1–2	46:08 – PP1 – Pelkonen (Hyytiä, Ukkola)
	1–3	58:49 – EN – Lundström (Tenhonen)

25 min
Penalties
28 min
6
Shots
4

16 March 2025; 12:30	RoKi Rovaniemi	5–6 OT (2–1, 0–2, 3–2) (OT: 0–1)	Lukko/PaRa	Lappi Areena, Rovaniemi; Attendance: 53

Annika Saastamoinen
Goalies
Katriina Saarenmaa
Referee:
Nikolas Mustonen
Linesmen:
Pietu Mustonen
Atte Mathlin

Felcmanová (Järvenpää, Keskisarja) – 03:49	1–0
	1–1	04:47 – Hyytiä (Laine)
Malicka (Kalová) – 18:45	2–1
	2–2	21:16 – SH1 – Haaslahti
	2–3	33:55 – Leino (Lindroth, Koskinen)
	2–4	48:10 – Tapani
Keskisarja (Malicka, Felcmanová) – PP1 – 53:34	3–4
	3–5	55:00 – Koskinen
Kalová (Malicka, Nikka) – 55:25	4–5
Iso-Kouvola (Kalová, Malicka) – PP1, EA – 59:50	5–5
	5–6	68:09 – Haaslahti

6 min
Penalties
10 min
44
Shots
20

27 March 2025; 18:45	Lukko/PaRa	2–4 (0–2, 1–1, 1–2)	RoKi Rovaniemi	Eurajoen jäähalli, Eurajoki; Attendance: 200

Netta-Sisko Lahtinen
Goalies
Alexandra Väyrynen
Referee:
Eero Luonto
Linesmen:
Ilona Silander
Oiva Aalto

	0–1	16:48 – PP1 – Záborská (Felcmanová, Heinonen)
	0–2	19:12 – Kalová (Keskisarja, Malicka)
Koskinen – 27:11	1–2
	1–3	51:06 – Keskisarja (Nikka)
	1–4	53:45 – Mustonen (Malicka, Venho)
Koskinen (Haaslahti) – 55:17	2–4

4 min
Penalties
12 min
23
Shots
31

23 March 2025; 12:30	Lukko/PaRa	2–3 OT (0–1, 1–0, 1–1) (OT: 0–1)	RoKi Rovaniemi	Eurajoen jäähalli, Eurajoki; Attendance: 150

Katriina Saarenmaa
Goalies
Alexandra Väyrynen
Referee:
Waltteri Kivelä
Linesmen:
Ilona Silander
Oiva Aalto

	0–1	17:06 – SH1 – Keskisarja (Malicka, Väyrynen)
Kangasniemi (Koskinen, Tapani) – 36:25	1–1
	1–2	53:29 – PP1 – Záborská (Iso-Kouvola, Malicka)
Ukkola (Hyytiä, Pelkonen) – PP1 – 57:43	2–2
	2–3	62:30 – Malicka (Keskisarja, Kalová)

10 min
Penalties
12 min
31
Shots
29

29 March 2025; 12:30	RoKi Rovaniemi	3–2 OT (0–1, 1–0, 1–1) (OT: 1–0)	Lukko/PaRa	Lappi Areena, Rovaniemi; Attendance: 204

Alexandra Väyrynen
Goalies
Netta-Sisko Lahtinen
Referee:
Eemi Kaarlela
Linesmen:
Perttu Kerkelä
Aleksi Kivi

	0–1	04:11 – Pelkonen (Ukkola)
Malicka (Kalová) – PP1 – 32:32	1–1
	1–2	44:28 – Koskinen
Heinonen (Järvenpää) – 48:05	2–2
Felcmanová (Lepola) – 65:04	3–2

8 min
Penalties
4 min
31
Shots
24

== Awards and honors ==
- Kultainen Kypärä ('Golden Helmet'): Emma Nuutinen, Kiekko-Espoo

=== Finnish Ice Hockey Association awards ===
- Riikka Nieminen Award (Player of the Year): Emma Nuutinen, Kiekko-Espoo
- Tuula Puputti Award (Goaltender of the Year): Salla Sivula, KalPa
- Päivi Halonen Award (Defender of the Year): Minttu Tuominen, Kiekko-Espoo
- Katja Riipi Award (Forward of the Year): Lisette Täks, Kiekko-Espoo
- Marianne Ihalainen Award (Top point scorer): Emma Nuutinen, Kiekko-Espoo
- Tiia Reima Award (Top goal scorer): Lisette Täks, Kiekko-Espoo
- Sari Fisk Award (Best plus–minus): Ada Eronen, Kiekko-Espoo
- Noora Räty Award (Rookie of the Year): Yenna Kolmonen, Team Kuortane
- Emma Laaksonen Award (Fair-play player): Anni Montonen, Kiekko-Espoo
- Karoliina Rantamäki Award (Playoff MVP): Minttu Tuominen, Kiekko-Espoo
- Hannu Saintula Award (Coach of the Year): Juuso Nieminen, Team Kuortane
- Student Athlete Award: Aino Kaijankoski, Kärpät
- U18 Student Athlete Award: Kerttu Kuja-Halkola, Team Kuortane
- Anu Hirvonen Award (Best Referee): Tiina Saarimäki
- Johanna Suban Award (Best Linesman): Aino Ranki

Source(s): Leijonat

=== All-Star teams ===
All-Star teams were selected by Auroraliiga coaches at the conclusion of the regular season.

All-Star Team

- Goaltender: Salla Sivula, KalPa
- Defenseman: Minttu Tuominen, Kiekko-Espoo
- Defenseman: Tuuli Tallinen, Team Kuortane
- Left Wing: Emma Nuutinen, Kiekko-Espoo
- Center: Lisette Täks, Kiekko-Espoo
- Right Wing: Barbora Juříčková, HPK

All-Star Team II

- Goaltender: Tiina Ranne, TPS
- Defenseman: Elli Suoranta, Ilves
- Defenseman: Ada Eronen, Kiekko-Espoo
- Left Wing: Anni Pere, HIFK
- Center: Kiti Seikkula, HPK
- Right Wing: Emma Ekoluoma, Ilves

=== Player of the Month ===
- September 2024: Salla Sivula (G), KalPa
  After dominating the goaltending statistics table in the opening month of the season, Sivula became the first player to be named Auroraliiga player of the month following the league rebrandeding in August 2024. She led the league with a save percentage of 95.7% across five games in net, conceding just nine goals on 208 shots against. KalPa struggled offesively and Sivula played a large role in securing their two wins in September – a shutout against RoKi and a 3–1 victory over Kiekko-Espoo.
- October 2024: Lisette Täks (F), Kiekko-Espoo
- November 2024: Elli Suoranta (D), Ilves
- December 2024: Ada Eronen (F), Kiekko-Espoo
- January 2025: Pauliina Salonen (F), HIFK
- February 2025: Kiti Seikkula (F), HPK

=== Player of the Week ===
The Strongest Player of the Week (Finnish: Viikon vahvin -pelaaja) honor was sponsored by the Swedish energy drink company NOCCO and announced via league official social media.

- Week 1: Siiri Friederiksen (F), TPS
- Week 2: Tiina Ranne (G), TPS
- Week 3: Emma Nuutinen (F), Kiekko-Espoo
- Week 4: Anni Pere (F), HIFK
- Week 5: Matilda Nilsson (F), Ilves
- Week 6: Barbora Juříčková (F), HPK
- Week 7: Raili Mustonen (F), Team Kuortane
- Week 8: Nea Katajamäki (F), Kiekko-Espoo
- Week 9: Sari Wäänänen (F), Kärpät
- Week 10: Susanna Järvenpää (F), RoKi
- Week 11: Minttu Tuominen (D), Kiekko-Espoo
- Week 12: Salla Sivula (G), KalPa
- Week 13: Anni Keisala (G), HPK
- Week 14: Ilona Palin (D), HIFK
- Week 15: Elli Mäkelä (D), KalPa
- Week 16: Karoliina Rantamäki (F), Kiekko-Espoo
- Week 17: Julia Kuusisto (F), Ilves
