= Lallukka =

Lallukka is a Finnish surname. Notable people with the surname include:

- Juha Lallukka (born 1979), Finnish cross country skier
- Juho Lallukka (1852–1913), Finnish businessman and patron of the arts
- Kyösti Lallukka (1944–2010), Finnish politician
- Piia Lallukka (born 1985), Finnish ice hockey player
