= Jenni Hiirikoski =

Finnish ice hockey player (born 1987)

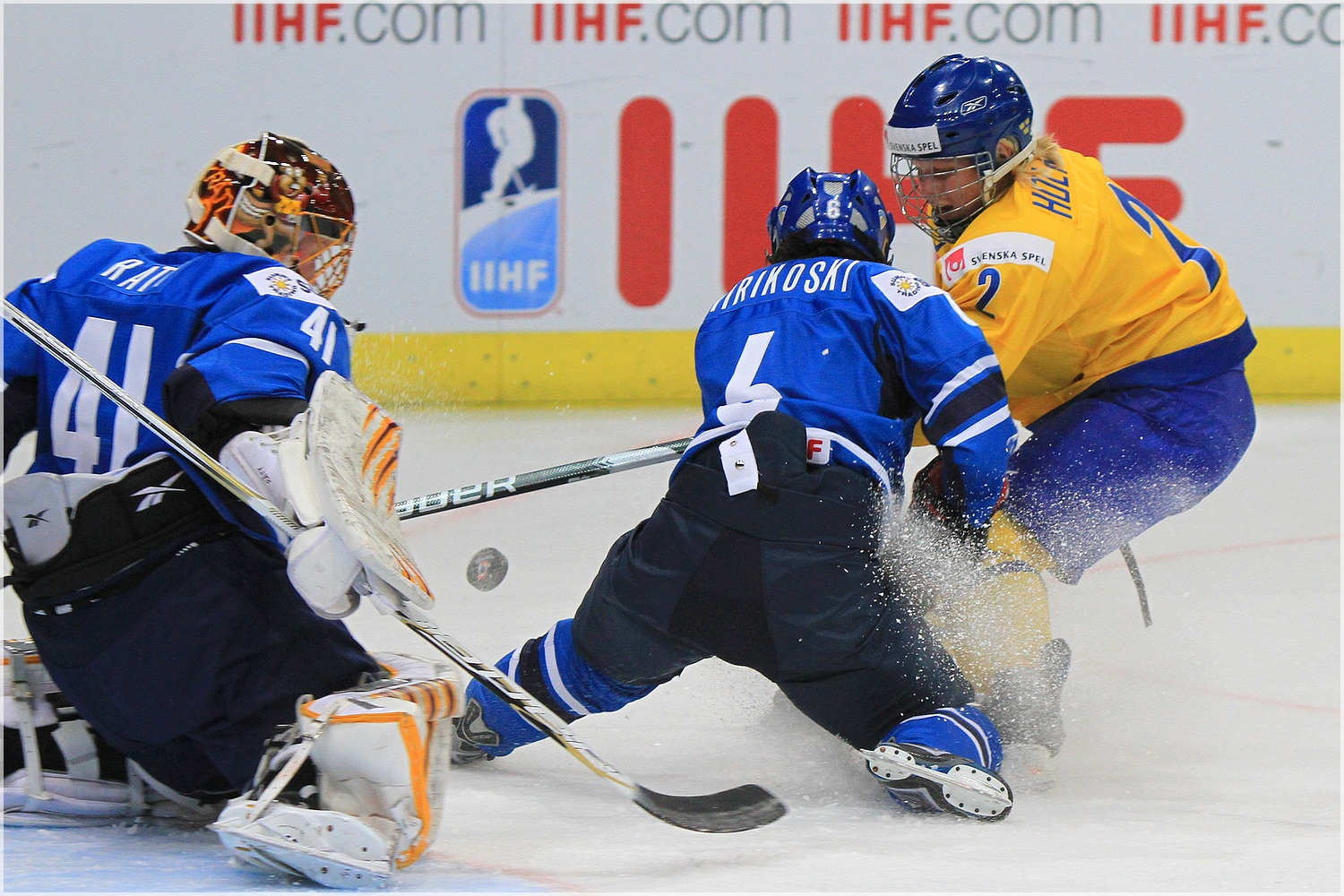
- Hiirikoski (center) representing Finland at the 2011 IIHF World Championship
- Born: 30 March 1987 (age 39) Lempäälä, Finland
- Height: 1.62 m (5 ft 4 in)
- Weight: 62 kg (137 lb; 9 st 11 lb)
- Position: Defense
- Shoots: Left
- SDHL team Former teams: Luleå HF/MSSK: Tampereen Ilves; Espoo Blues; SKIF Nizhny Novgorod; JYP Jyväskylä
- National team: Finland
- Playing career: 2001–present
Medal record
Olympic Games
Bronze medal – third place	2010 Vancouver	Ice hockey
Bronze medal – third place	2018 Pyeongchang	Ice hockey
Bronze medal – third place	2022 Beijing	Ice hockey
World Championship
Silver medal – second place	2019 Finland
Bronze medal – third place	2004 Canada
Bronze medal – third place	2008 China
Bronze medal – third place	2009 Finland
Bronze medal – third place	2011 Switzerland
Bronze medal – third place	2015 Sweden
Bronze medal – third place	2017 United States
Bronze medal – third place	2021 Canada
Bronze medal – third place	2024 United States

Jenni Hiirikoski (born 30 March 1987) is a Finnish ice hockey player and captain of the Finnish national team and Luleå HF/MSSK in the Swedish Women's Hockey League (SDHL).

She is widely considered one of the best active ice hockey defensemen in the world, having won the IIHF Directorate Best Defenceman award seven times during the 2010s. She is currently the second all-time leading scorer among SDHL defenders and the third all-time leading scorer for Luleå, winning three SDHL championships with the club, has been named SDHL Defender of the Year twice, and is one of only two players to have been named top Olympic defender twice.

== Playing career ==
Hiirikoski grew up in Lempäälä, Finland, and played youth ice hockey with the local club Lempäälän Kisa (LeKi). She began her premier league career in 2001, at age 14, with the Tampereen Ilves Naiset of the Naisten SM-sarja (renamed Naisten Liiga in 2017). With Ilves, she won the Finnish Championship in 2006 and the Finnish Championship silver (runner-up) medals in 2004 and 2005.

After achieving Finnish Championship gold with Ilves, Hiirikoski joined the 2006–07 Espoo Blues, which had a roster overflowing with talent; in addition to Hiirikoski, the team included Karoliina Rantamäki, Noora Räty, Emma Terho, Marjo Voutilainen and other all-stars of the Finnish national team. With so much accumulated skill, it was no surprise when Espoo Blues claimed the Finnish Championship in 2007.

Hiirikoski returned to Ilves for the 2007–08 season and won her third Finnish Championship silver medal with them in 2008.

For the 2008–09 season, Hiirikoski joined her first club outside of Finland, signing with SKIF Nizhny Novgorod in the Russian Women's Hockey League (replaced by the Zhenskaya Hockey League (ZhHL) in 2015). The roster included two other Finns, her teammates from the Espoo Blues Karoliina Rantamäki and Marjo Voutilainen. SKIF was dominant and won both the Russian Championship and the 2009 IIHF European Women's Champions Cup.

In June 2016, she announced that she was moving to Sweden to sign with Luleå HF/MSSK as the club prepared to defend their SDHL championship. She scored 45 points in 36 games in her debut SDHL season, the league's leading scorer among defenders and fourth overall, serving as an assistant captain for the team. She added another 4 points in four playoff games as Luleå was eliminated in the semi-finals by HV71.

She was named Luleå captain ahead of the 2017–18 season.

After going without a point in her first twelve games of the 2019–20 season, despite leading the league in shots, she finished the season with 40 points in 34 games. Luleå would make it to the playoff finals before the season was canceled due to the COVID-19 pandemic in Sweden.

She was nominated for Luleå resident of the year in 2019. She was named the eighth best women's hockey player of the decade by The Hockey News in December 2019, with the magazine stating that it was possible to "make a case that she’s been the most criminally underrated player of the decade and maybe in women’s hockey history." Both she and Ronja Savolainen were nominated for the 2019–20 SDHL Best Defender Award, though the award ultimately went to Sidney Morin of HV71.

=== Style of play ===
Hiirikoski's speed, on-ice awareness, and passing ability have drawing comparisons to Erik Karlsson at the height of his career.

== International play ==
Hiirikoski made her debut with the Finnish national team at age 17 in the 2004 IIHF Women's World Championship (her birthday coincided with the first day of the tournament) and has appeared in every major international tournament since. She has served as team captain continuously since the 2011–12 season.

Representing Finland, she has won three Olympic bronze medals: at the 2010 Winter Olympics in Vancouver, the 2018 Winter Olympics in PyeongChang, and the 2022 Winter Olympics in Beijing. She also competed with the Finnish national team in the women's ice hockey tournament at the 2014 Winter Olympics in Sochi, at which Finland placed fifth.

As of 2024, Hiirikoski has participated in fifteen IIHF Women's World Championships, winning a silver medal at the tournament in 2019 and eight bronze medals, at the tournaments in 2004, 2008, 2009, 2011, 2015, 2017, 2021, and 2024.

She was involved in the controversial no-goal call in overtime of the 2019 IIHF Women's World Championship gold-medal game, which cost Finland the victory after the goal scored by Finland's Petra Nieminen was waved off because Hiirikoski had made contact with American goaltender Alex Cavallini outside of the crease.

On 2 January 2026, she was named to Finland's roster to compete at the 2026 Winter Olympics.

== Career statistics ==
=== Regular season and playoffs ===
			Regular season					Playoffs
Season	Team	League	GP	G	A	Pts	PIM	GP	G	A	Pts	PIM
2001–02	Ilves	NSMs	8	2	2	4	2	8	0	2	2	14
2002–03	Ilves	NSMs	23	6	3	9	6	6	3	0	3	2
2003–04	Ilves	NSMs	24	6	11	17	14	7	1	3	4	2
2004–05	Ilves	NSMs	20	3	17	20	10	5	2	0	2	0
2005–06	Ilves	NSMs	15	0	7	7	18	7	2	0	2	14
2006–07	Espoo Blues	NSMs	22	8	16	24	20	7	1	3	4	2
2007–08	Ilves	NSMs	19	8	21	29	12	8	2	6	8	6
2008–09	SKIF	RWHL	13	8	5	13	10	–	–	–	–	–
2009–10	Ilves	NSMs	19	4	39	43	6	11	4	7	11	4
2010–11	JYP	NSMs	18	4	12	16	28	3	0	0	0	0
2011–12	JYP	RWHL	26	8	17	25	16	–	–	–	–	–
2011–12	JYP	NSMs	8	3	12	15	4	–	–	–	–	–
2012–13	JYP	NSMs	28	19	18	37	12	8	2	6	8	10
2013–14	JYP	NSMs	25	20	26	46	12	8	3	8	11	4
2014–15	JYP	NSMs	28	18	43	61	10	7	1	7	8	4
2015–16	JYP	NSMs	28	17	62	79	8	6	3	9	12	2
2016–17	Luleå/MSSK	SDHL	36	12	33	45	28	4	2	2	4	4
2017–18	Luleå/MSSK	SDHL	36	22	33	55	18	7	1	3	4	0
2018–19	Luleå/MSSK	SDHL	34	19	44	63	36	11	4	10	14	4
2019–20	Luleå/MSSK	SDHL	34	12	28	40	20	6	1	4	5	2
2020–21	Luleå/MSSK	SDHL	34	9	38	47	12	9	3	6	9	4
2021–22	Luleå/MSSK	SDHL	34	11	34	45	14	12	1	7	8	0
2022–23	Luleå/MSSK	SDHL	31	5	32	37	15	7	1	5	6	4
2023–24	Luleå/MSSK	SDHL	36	9	24	33	4	9	2	6	8	0
2024–25	Luleå/MSSK	SDHL	28	4	19	23	4	4	0	3	3	2
Naisten SM-sarja totals			285	118	289	407	162	91	24	51	75	64
SDHL totals			303	103	285	388	151	69	15	46	61	20

=== International ===
Year	Team	Event	Result	GP	G	A	Pts	PIM
2004	Finland	WC	3rd place, bronze medalist(s)	5	0	0	0	0
2005	Finland	WC	4th	5	1	0	1	4
2007	Finland	WC	4th	5	0	1	1	8
2008	Finland	WC	3rd place, bronze medalist(s)	5	1	2	3	4
2009	Finland	WC	3rd place, bronze medalist(s)	5	1	2	3	2
2010	Finland	OG	3rd place, bronze medalist(s)	5	0	2	2	4
2011	Finland	WC	3rd place, bronze medalist(s)	6	0	2	2	2
2012	Finland	WC	4th	6	0	5	5	2
2013	Finland	WC	4th	6	0	1	1	2
2014	Finland	OG	5th	6	3	2	5	2
2015	Finland	WC	3rd place, bronze medalist(s)	6	2	2	4	4
2016	Finland	WC	4th	6	1	3	4	2
2017	Finland	WC	3rd place, bronze medalist(s)	6	3	2	5	2
2018	Finland	OG	3rd place, bronze medalist(s)	6	0	2	2	2
2019	Finland	WC	2nd place, silver medalist(s)	7	2	8	10	0
2021	Finland	WC	3rd place, bronze medalist(s)	7	0	3	3	0
2022	Finland	OG	3rd place, bronze medalist(s)	7	0	5	5	4
2022	Finland	WC	6th	7	0	1	1	4
2023	Finland	WC	5th	7	3	8	11	2
2024	Finland	WC	3rd place, bronze medalist(s)	7	1	5	6	4
2026	Finland	OG	6th	4	0	0	0	2
Senior totals				124	18	56	74	56

== Honors and achievements ==
Award / Honour	Year
International
World Championship Bronze Medal	2004, 2008, 2009, 2011, 2015, 2017, 2021, 2024
World Championship Top 3 Player on Team	2007, 2009, 2011, 2012, 2013, 2015, 2016, 2019, 2021
World Championship Best Defenceman	2009, 2012, 2013, 2015, 2016, 2017, 2019
Olympic Bronze Medal	2010, 2018, 2022
Olympic All-Star Team	2014, 2018, 2022
Olympic Best Defenceman	2014, 2018
World Championship All-Star Team	2015, 2016, 2017, 2019
World Championship Silver Medal	2019
World Championship MVP	2019
Naisten SM-sarja
Aurora Borealis Cup Champion	2006, 2007, 2010, 2016
Naisten SM-sarja All-Star First Team	2008, 2010, 2013, 2014, 2015, 2016
Päivi Halonen Award (Defenseman of the Year)	2008, 2013, 2014, 2015, 2016
Riikka Nieminen Award (Player of the Year)	2010, 2013, 2014, 2015, 2016
Marianne Ihalainen Award (Most points)	2016
SDHL
SDHL Champion	2018, 2019, 2021, 2022, 2023, 2024
SDHL Defenseman of the Year	2018, 2019
SDHL Playoffs MVP	2018, 2019
Other
European Women's Champions Cup Best Defenceman	2009
