= Liisa Karikoski =

Finnish ice hockey player

- Born: 11 August 1958 (age 68) Espoo, Uusimaa, Finland
- Position: Forward
- Played for: Kiekko-Espoo; EVU
- National team: Finland
- Playing career: 1982–1994
Medal record
World Championship
Bronze medal – third place	1990 Canada
Bronze medal – third place	1992 Finland
European Championship
Gold medal – first place	1989 West Germany
Gold medal – first place	1993 Denmark

Liisa Karikoski (born 11 August 1958) is a Finnish retired ice hockey forward. Karikoski played internationally with the Finnish national team and represented Finland at two IIHF Women's World Championships and two IIHF European Women Championships. At the 1990 IIHF Women's World Championship, the first official women's world championship sanctioned by the International Ice Hockey Federation (IIHF), Karikoski played in five games, scoring 2 goals and adding 9 assists. Finland finished the tournament with a bronze medal. In 1992, Karikoski again helped Finland to a bronze medal with 2 assists in 5 games.

== Career statistics ==
Year	Team	Event	Result	GP	G	A	Pts	PIM
1990	Finland	WC	3rd place, bronze medalist(s)	5	2	9	11	2
