= Sanna Kanerva =

Finnish ice hockey player

- Born: 24 June 1974 (age 52) Oulu, Finland
- Height: 1.72 m (5 ft 8 in)
- Weight: 77 kg (170 lb; 12 st 2 lb)
- Position: Forward
- Shot: Left
- Played for: Espoo Blues; Keravan Shakers; Porin Ässät
- National team: Finland
- Playing career: 1989–2001
Medal record
World Championship
Bronze medal – third place	1999 Finland
European Championship
Gold medal – first place	1995 Latvia

Sanna Kanerva (born 24 June 1974) is a Finnish retired ice hockey player. A member of the Finnish national ice hockey team during 1994 to 1999, she won a bronze medal at the 1999 IIHF Women's World Championship and a gold medal at the 1995 IIHF European Women Championship.

Kanerva played a twelve-season club career in the Naisten SM-sarja with the Porin Ässät Naiset (1989–1995), the Keravan Shakers (1995–1998), and the Espoo Blues Naiset (1998–2001).
