= Päivi Virta =

Finnish ice hockey player

- Born: 3 August 1964 (age 62) Tampere, Finland
- Height: 1.58 m (5 ft 2 in)
- Weight: 60 kg (132 lb; 9 st 6 lb)
- Position: Defence
- Shot: Left
- Played for: Tampereen Ilves; Keravan Shakers; Kiekko-Espoo; Espoo Blues
- National team: Finland
- Playing career: 1982–2006
Medal record
World Championship
Bronze medal – third place	2000 Canada
Bronze medal – third place	1999 Finland
Bronze medal – third place	1994 United States
Bronze medal – third place	1992 Finland
Bronze medal – third place	1990 Canada
European Championship
Gold medal – first place	1995 Latvia
Gold medal – first place	1993 Denmark
Gold medal – first place	1991 Czechoslovakia
Gold medal – first place	1989 West Germany
Bronze medal – third place	1996 Russia

Päivi Virta (previously Halonen; born 3 August 1964) is a Finnish retired ice hockey defenseman and one of the most highly decorated women in the history of Finnish ice hockey. As a member of the Finnish national team she won five World Championship bronze medals and five European Championship medals, four gold and one bronze.

== Playing career ==
Virta started her premiere league career in the Naisten SM-sarja (renamed Naisten Liiga in 2017) with the Tampereen Ilves in 1982, the same year the league was established. She went on to play in more than 400 games— with Ilves, the Keravan Shakers, Kiekko-Espoo, and the Espoo Blues— in a career that spanned 24 seasons.

Virta saw the Naisten SM-sarja medal podium in every season that she played. She was Finnish Champion fifteen times, more playoff victories than any other player in league history. She also collected six silver Finnish Championship medals and three bronze Finnish Championship.

== International play ==
Virta played in over 140 international matches with the Finnish national team and won bronze medals at the IIHF Women's World Championships in 1990, 1992, 1994, 1999, and 2000; gold medals at the IIHF European Women Championships in 1989, 1991, 1993, and 1995; and a bronze medal at the 1996 IIHF European Women Championships.

== Awards and honors ==
In 2004 Virta was the first women's hockey player ever to be awarded the Finnish Ice Hockey Association President's Trophy, annually bestowed upon a person who has made significant contributions to Finnish ice hockey. She is also one of fewer-than-ten women to have been inducted to the Hockey Hall of Fame Finland and thus to be named a Suomen Jääkiekkoleijona (Finnish Ice Hockey Lion).

The Finnish Ice Hockey Association presents the Päivi Halonen Award to the Naisten Liiga Defenseman of the Year.
