= Leena Majaranta =

Finnish ice hockey player

- Born: 14 November 1958 (age 67) Tampere, Finland
- Position: Forward
- Played for: Tampereen Ilves
- National team: Finland
- Playing career: 1982–1990
Medal record
World Championships
Bronze medal – third place	1990 Canada

Leena Majaranta (born 14 November 1958 in Tampere) is a Finnish retired ice hockey player. Majaranta played internationally for the Finnish National team at the 1990 IIHF Women's World Championship. Majaranta played in five games for Finland, scoring three goals and adding two assists. Finland captured the bronze medal at the tournament.
