= Vilma Vaattovaara =

Finnish ice hockey goaltender and coach

- Born: 10 March 1993 (age 33) Kirkkonummi, Finland
- Height: 1.71 m (5 ft 7 in)
- Weight: 68 kg (150 lb; 10 st 10 lb)
- Position: Goaltender
- Caught: Left
- Played for: London Dragons C Tampereen Ilves; New Hampshire Wildcats; HPK Hämeenlinna
- Current NIHL coach: Streatham Black Hawks
- National team: Finland
- Playing career: 2008–2019
- Coaching career: 2021–present
Medal record
World Championship
Bronze medal – third place	2015 Sweden

Vilma Vaattovaara (born 10 March 1993) is a Finnish ice hockey coach and retired goaltender. She serves as goaltending coach with the Streatham Youth Ice Hockey Club, the youth affiliate of Streatham IHC. Her coaching oversight includes the Streatham Black Hawks in Division II of the National Ice Hockey League (NIHL) in addition to the club's minor and junior teams.

As a member of the Finnish national team, she won a bronze medal at the 2015 IIHF Women's World Championship.

== Playing career ==
Vaattovaara played college ice hockey with the New Hampshire Wildcats women's ice hockey program in the Hockey East (HEA) conference of the NCAA Division I during 2012 to 2016, and with the London Dragons C of the British Universities Ice Hockey Association (BUIHA) in 2018–19.

In her native Finland, she played in the Naisten Liiga with the Tampereen Ilves Naiset and HPK Kiekkonaiset, with whom she won the Aurora Borealis Cup in 2011; she recorded the league's best goals against average and save percentage in the 2010–11, 2011–12, and 2017–18 seasons.

== Personal life ==
Vaattovaara has a BSc in zoology/pre-veterinary medicine from the University of New Hampshire and is currently a veterinary student at the Royal Veterinary College of the University of London.

As of March 2022, she is the logistics head for the independently operated University of London Dragons organisation, which manages the various London Dragons ice hockey teams in the BUIHA.

Her siblings also played ice hockey – her elder brother, Ville, was a goaltender in the Finnish junior leagues and her younger sister, Viivi, was a defenseman in the Naisten Liiga and played four years of NCAA hockey, one Division I season with the UConn Huskies and three Division III seasons with the Buffalo State Bengals.
