= Ilves Naiset =

Auroraliiga ice hockey team in Tampere, Finland

Tampereen Ilves Naiset
- City: Tampere, Finland
- League: Auroraliiga
- Founded: 1982
- Home arena: Tesoman jäähalli
- Colours: Green, yellow, black, white
- General manager: Rami Kujala
- Head coach: Marjo Voutilainen
- Captain: Jenna Lehtiniemi
- Website: Official website

Championships
- Aurora Borealis Cup: 10 (1985, 1986, 1987, 1988, 1990, 1991, 1992, 1993, 2006, 2010)
- EWCC: 1 (2011)

Tampereen Ilves Naiset (lit. 'Tampere Lynx Women') are an ice hockey team in the Auroraliiga. They are the representative women's team of the multi-sport club Ilves, based in Tampere, and their home arena is Tesoman jäähalli in Tampere's Tesoma district.

Ilves is the only team that has played in every season since the establishment of the Naisten SM-sarja in 1982 (called the Naisten Liiga in 2017–2024 and rebranded as Auroraliiga in 2024). The team ranks second on the list of most Aurora Borealis Cup wins, with ten, and has claimed the most Finnish Championship medals in league history, with ten gold, twelve silver, and eight bronze for 30 total medals.

== Season-by-season results ==
This is a partial list of the most recent seasons completed by Tampereen Ilves Naiset.
Note: Finish = Rank at end of regular season; GP = Games played, W = Wins (3 points), OTW = Overtime wins (2 points), OTL = Overtime losses (1 point), L = Losses, GF = Goals for, GA = Goals against, Pts = Points, Top scorer: Points (Goals+Assists)

Season	League	Preliminaries and regular season										Postseason results
Season	League	Finish	GP	W	OTW	OTL	L	GF	GA	Pts	Top scorer	Postseason results
2015–16	Naisten SM-sarja	8	28	0	2	1	25	31	178	5	(Finland) S. Parkusjärvi 10 (4+6)	Saved in relegation
2016–17	Naisten SM-sarja	6	28	9	3	4	12	62	73	37	(Finland) S. Kärnä 25 (13+12)	Lost quarterfinals to KalPa, 1–2
2017–18	Naisten Liiga	1	30	21	5	2	2	139	41	75	(Finland) L. Välimäki. 58 (30+28)	(silver) Lost finals to Kärpät, 1–3
2018–19	Naisten Liiga	2	30	21	1	1	7	149	70	66	(Finland) L. Välimäki. 71 (36+35)	(silver) Lost finals to Blues, 0–3
2019–20	Naisten Liiga	6	30	9	2	5	14	77	95	36	(Finland) J. Suokko 32 (13+19)	Lost quarterfinals to KalPa, 0–3
2020–21	Naisten Liiga	4th	28	12	3	5	8	83	66	47	(Finland) J. Suokko 36 (22+14)	Lost bronze medal game to HIFK, 1–2
2021–22	Naisten Liiga	4th	30	12	2	3	13	78	72	43	(Finland) A. Kaitala 30 (17+13)	Lost quarterfinals to TPS, 0–3
2022–23	Naisten Liiga	5th	36	16	4	3	13	105	98	59	(Finland) E. Varpula 36 (11+25)	Lost quarterfinals to HPK, 1–3
2023–24	Naisten Liiga	5th	32	14	5	1	12	102	94	53	(Finland) A. Kaitala 34 (21+13)	Lost quarterfinals to KalPa, 1–3
2024–25	Auroraliiga	5th	32	16	2	1	13	118	99	53	(Finland) M. Nilsson 43 (23+20)	(bronze) Won bronze medal game vs Kuortane, 4–1
2025–26	Auroraliiga	5th	32	16	2	2	12	154	88	54	(Finland) E. Ekoluoma 47 (22+25)	(bronze) Won bronze medal game vs HIFK, 5–2

== Players and personnel ==
=== 2025–26 roster ===
As of 28 March 2026

No.	Nat	Player	Pos	S/G	Age	Acquired	Birthplace
84	(Finland)	Anna-Kaisa Antti-Roiko	F	L	22	2025	Oulu, North Ostrobothnia, Finland
36	(Finland)	Emma Ekoluoma	F	L	20	2024	Raahe, North Ostrobothnia, Finland
14	(Finland)	Eerika Hautala	D	L	22	2025	Liminka, North Ostrobothnia, Finland
37	(Finland)	Jenna Juutilainen	G	L	36	2025	Varkaus, North Savo, Finland
17	(Finland)	Johanna Juutilainen	F	L	36	2025	Varkaus, North Savo, Finland
6	(Finland)	Linda Järvinen	D	–	18	2024	
29	(Finland)	Eerika Kujala	G	L	16	2024	Tampere, Pirkanmaa, Finland
58	(Finland)	Susanna Kupari	F	L	26	2024	
26	(Finland)	Julia Kuusisto	F	L	19	2022	Vaasa, Ostrobothnia, Finland
4	(Finland)	Jenna Lehtiniemi (C)	D	L	28	2014	Ikaalinen, Pirkanmaa, Finland
28	(Finland)	Saimi Lehto	F	L	24	2025	Riihimäki, Kanta-Häme, Finland
11	(Finland)	Linnea Melotindos	F	L	26	2022	Tampere, Pirkanmaa, Finland
44	(Finland)	Noora Mylläri	F	L	26	2022	Vaasa, Ostrobothnia, Finland
30	(Finland)	Melisa Mörönen	G	L	28	2022	Alavus, South Ostrobothnia, Finland
20	(Finland)	Matilda Nilsson	F	L	29	2024	Espoo, Uusimaa, Finland
19	(Finland)	Aleksandra Nurminen	F	L	23	2022	Ylöjärvi, South Ostrobothnia, Finland
18	(Finland)	Tuuli Ollikainen	F	L	24	2020	Lappeenranta, South Karelia, Finland
12	(Finland)	Pihla Parkkonen	F	L	24	2020	Mikkeli, South Savo, Finland
32	(Finland)	Neea Pohjamo	G	L	24	2021	Ruokolahti, South Karelia, Finland
62	(Finland)	Elli Pohjanaho	D	L	19	2023	Nokia, Pirkanmaa, Finland
5	(Finland)	Venla Riipinen	F	L	27	2019	Mikkeli, South Savo, Finland
31	(Finland)	Oona Rouhiainen	D	L	25	2018	Jyväskylä, Central Finland, Finland
25	(Finland)	Johanna Siira (A)	D	L	28	2017	Mäntsälä, Uusimaa, Finland
85	(Czech Republic)	Karolína Skořepová	F	L	19	2025	Prague, Czechia
9	(Finland)	Helen Strömberg	F	L	30	2019	Hollola, Päijät-Häme, Finland
33	(Finland)	Elli Suoranta (A)	D	R	24	2021	Tampere, Pirkanmaa, Finland
24	(Finland)	Nanna Timonen	D	L	19	2019	Kangasala, Pirkanmaa, Finland
23	(Finland)	Olivia Turunen	F	L	17	2024	
88	(Finland)	Emilia Varpula	F	L	26	2020	Kuortane, South Ostrobothnia, Finland

Coaching staff and team personnel

- Head coach: Marjo Voutilainen
- Assistant coach: Nuutti Ylitalo
- Goaltending coach: Atte Ojala
- Conditioning coach: Elise Heikkilä
- Equipment managers: Marko Lahtinen & Nina Tuomaala

=== Team captaincy history ===
- Marianne Ihalainen, 1990–1998
- Mari Östring, 1999–2000
- Marianne Ihalainen, 2000–01
- Evelina Similä, 2001–02
- Mari Saarinen, 2007–2011
- Johanna Koivula, 2011–2014
- Anna Kilponen, 2014–15
- Satu-Annika Parkusjärvi, 2015–16
- Anne Tuomanen, 2016–17
- Linda Välimäki, 2017–18
- Anne Tuomanen, 2018–19
- Johanna Juutilainen, 2019–20
- Anna Kilponen, 2020–January 2022
- Jenna Lehtiniemi, January 2022–April 2022
- Helen Puputti, 2022–23
- Jenna Lehtiniemi, 2023–

=== Head coaches ===
- Markku Hannunkivi, 1992–93
- Petteri Linna & Jarmo Nurmi, 1994–1996
- Janne Hakala & Markku Hannunkivi, 1996–97
- Antti Kallioinen & Ville Tolvanen, 1997–1999
- Tapio Koho, 1999–2002
- Marianne Ihalainen, 2002–2006
- Samuli Marjeta, 2009–13 January 2012
- Severi Lehtonen, 13 January 2012–March 2012
- Timo Lindqvist, August 2012–28 October 2012
- Jouko Urvikko, 28 October 2012 – 2013
- Osmo Lindström, 2014–2016
- Mari Saarinen, 2016–2018
- Jarmo Jamalainen, 2018–19
- Ville Tolvanen, 2019–20
- Linda Leppänen, 2020–2022
- Marjo Voutilainen, 2022–

=== Retired numbers ===
#10 Anne Haanpää
#15 Johanna Koivula
#16 Marianne Ihalainen

== Honours and awards ==
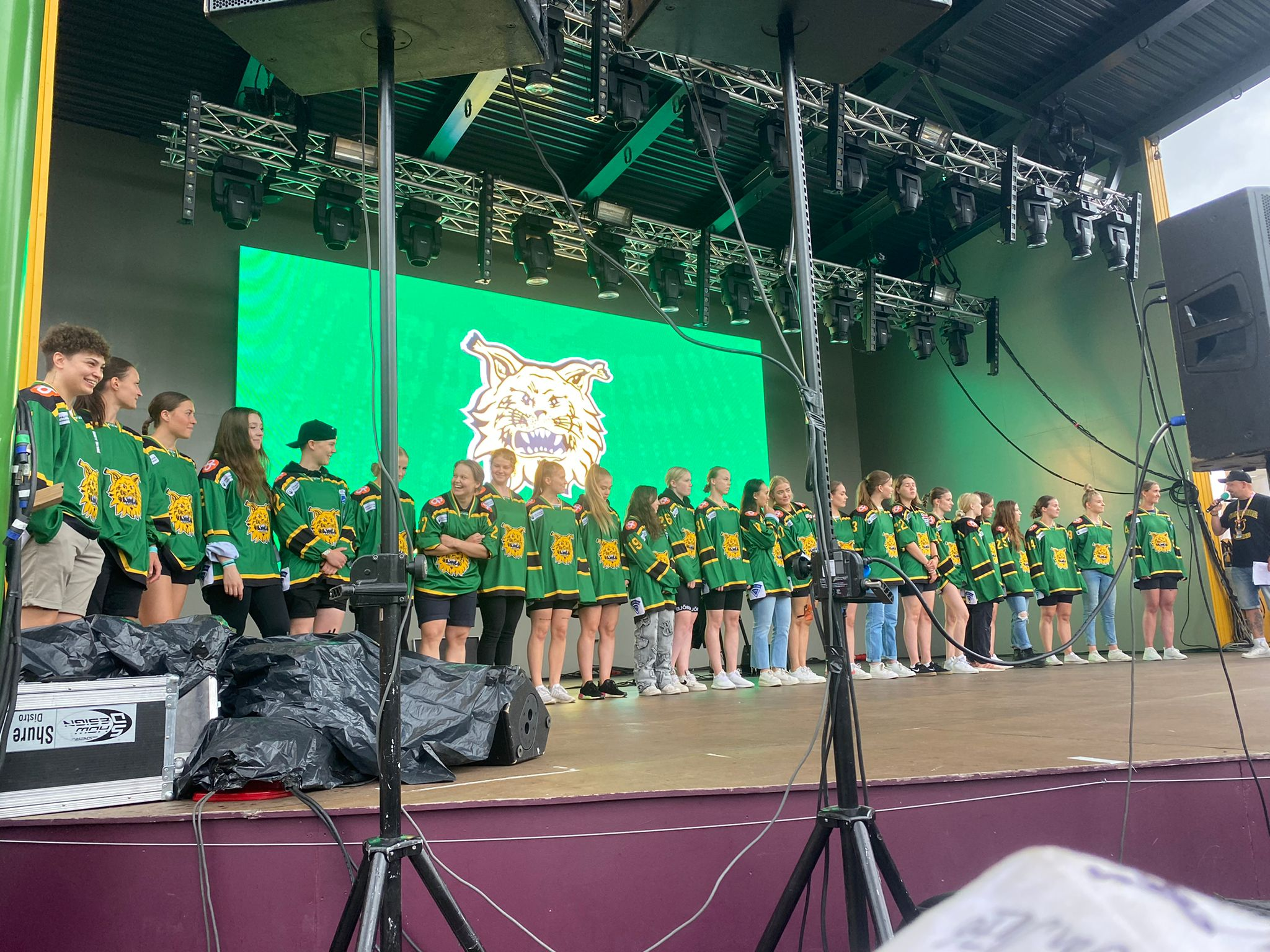
Ilves players

=== Finnish Championship ===
- (gold) Aurora Borealis Cup (10): 1985, 1986, 1987, 1988, 1990, 1991, 1992, 1993, 2006, 2010
- (silver) Runners-up (12): 1983, 1989, 1994, 1995, 2004, 2005, 2008, 2009, 2011, 2012, 2018, 2019
- (bronze) Third Place (8): 1984, 1999, 2000, 2001, 2003, 2015, 2025, 2026

=== European Women's Champions Cup ===
Ilves represented the Naisten SM-sarja as reigning Finnish Champion at the IIHF European Women's Champions Cup in 2011.

- (gold) Gold (1): 2011

=== Individual awards ===
Finnish Ice Hockey Association trophies recognizing individual Auroraliiga players won by Ilves team members. Former Ilves head coach Linda Leppänen (née Välimäki) is the most prolific award-winning player in team history, having won both the highest number of trophies, with seven, and the broadest variety of trophies, with five different awards.

- Riikka Nieminen Award (Player of the Year)

- 2009–10: Jenni Hiirikoski
- 2017–18: Linda Välimäki

- Päivi Halonen Award (Best defenseman)

- 2005–06: Heidi Pelttari

- Tuula Puputti Award (Best goaltender)

- 2005–06: Maija Hassinen
- 2007–08: Maija Hassinen
- 2020–21: Anni Keisala

- Katja Riipi Award (Best forward)

- 2005–06: Saara Tuominen
- 2009–10: Linda Välimäki

- Noora Räty Award (Best rookie)

- 2010–11: Venla Kotkaslahti

- Marianne Ihalainen Award (Top point scorer)

- 1984–85: Anne Haanpää
- 1989–90: Marianne Ihalainen
- 1991–92: Anne Nurmi
- 1994–95: Sari Fisk
- 2009–10: Linda Välimäki
- 2017–18: Linda Välimäki

- Tiia Reima Award (Top goal scorer)

- 1984–85: Anne Haanpää
- 1989–90: Marianne Ihalainen
- 1991–92: Anne Nurmi
- 1994–95: Sari Marjamäki
- 2000–01: Sari Marjamäki
- 2009–10: Linda Välimäki
- 2017–18: Linda Välimäki

- Sari Fisk Award (Best plus/minus)

- 2011–12: Heidi Pelttari

- Emma Laaksonen Award (Fair-play player)

- 2011–12: Satu Niinimäki

- Karoliina Rantamäki Award (Playoff MVP)

- 2005–06: Maija Hassinen
- 2009–10: Linda Välimäki

- Student Athlete of the Year

- 2019–20: Tanja Koljonen

==== All-Stars ====
Note: Second Team All-Star honors were not awarded prior to the 2017–18 season.
Naisten Liiga All-Star First Team selections:

- 2007–08: Maija Hassinen-Sullanmaa (G), Jenni Hiirikoski (D)
- 2008–09: Linda Välimäki (C)
- 2009–10: Jenni Hiirikoski (D), Linda Välimäki (C), Sari Kärnä (RW)
- 2010–11: Anna Kilponen (D)
- 2011–12: Heidi Peltari (D)
- 2017–18: Linda Välimäki (C), Riikka Noronen (RW)
- 2020–21: Anni Keisala (G), Anna Kilponen (D)

Naisten Liiga All-Star Second Team selections:

- 2018–19: Kreetta Kulhua (D), Linda Välimäki (C)
- 2019–20: Kreetta Kulhua (D)
- 2020–21: Jenna Suokko (LW)

==== Player of the Month ====
- October 2017: Linda Välimäki
- January 2021: Anni Keisala
- September 2023: Salla Sivula

== Team records and leaders ==
As of 23 June 2024

=== Regular season ===
Career records

- Most points: Marianne Ihalainen, 602 points (323 games; 1982–2001)
- Most points, defenseman: Anna Aaltomaa, 203 points (279 games; 1992–2006)
- Most goals: Marianne Ihalainen, 320 goals (323 games; 1982–2001)
- Most assists: Johanna Koivula, 302 assists (495 games; 1997–2018)
- Highest points per game (P/G), over 30 games played: Linda Leppänen (née Välimäki), 2.11 P/G (157 games; 2005–2019)
- Most penalty minutes (PIM): Johanna Koivula, 323 PIM (495 games; 1997–2018)
- Most games played, skater: Johanna Koivula, 495 games (1997–2018)
- Most games played, goaltender: Viivi Vartia-Koivisto, 98 games (2008–2021)
- Best save percentage, over 25 games played: Anni Keisala, .937 Sv% (74 games; 2018–2022)
- Best goals against average (GAA), over 25 games played: Camilla Kortesniemi, 2.12 GAA (28 games; 2016–2019)
- Most shutouts:

- Anni Keisala, 9 shutouts (74 games; 2018–2022)
- Viivi Vartia-Koivisto, 9 shutouts (98 games; 2008–2021)

Single-season records

- Most points: Tiia Reima, 85 points (24 games; 1993–94)
- Most points, defenseman: Kirsi Hirvonen, 56 points (23 games; 1993–94)
- Most goals: Tiia Reima, 56 goals (24 games; 1993–94)
- Most assists: Jenni Hiirikoski, 39 assists (19 games; 2009–10)
- Highest points per game, over ten games played: Linda Leppänen (née Välimäki), 4.05 P/G (19 games; 2009–10)
- Most penalty minutes in a season: Rosa Lindstedt, 84 PIM (24 games; 2010–11)
- Best save percentage, over ten games played: Vilma Vaattovaara, .951 Sv% (16 games; 2011–12)
- Best goals against average, over ten games played: Vilma Vaattovaara, 1.09 GAA (16 games; 2011–12)
- Most shutouts: Vilma Vaattovaara, 5 shutouts (21 games; 2017–18)

==== All-time scoring leaders ====
The top-ten regular season point-scorers in franchise history.

Note: Nat = Nationality; Pos = Position; GP = Games played; G = Goals; A = Assists; Pts = Points; P/G = Points per game; = current Ilves player; Bold^ indicates franchise record

Points
Nat	Player	Pos	GP	G	A	Pts	P/G
(Finland)	Marianne Ihalainen	F	323	320^	282	602^	1.864
(Finland)	Johanna Koivula	F	495^	186	302^	488	0.986
(Finland)	Mari Saarinen	F/D	315	158	180	338	1.073
(Finland)	Linda Leppänen	F	157	182	149	331	2.108^
(Finland)	Tiia Reima	F	159	198	127	325	2.044
(Finland)	Sari Fisk	F	196	180	144	324	1.653
(Finland)	Marika Lehtimäki	F/D	166	113	124	237	1.428
(Finland)	Tiina Pihala	F	167	88	136	224	1.341
(Finland)	Anne Nurmi	F	124	116	98	214	1.726
(Finland)	Jaana Peltonen	F	179	106	103	209	1.168

=== Playoffs ===
Career records

- Most points: Johanna Koivula, 74 points (128 games; 1997–2018)
- Most points, defenseman: Jenni Hiirikoski, 32 points (52 games; 2001–2010)
- Most goals: Marianne Ihalainen, 36 goals (53 games; 1983–2001)
- Most assists: Johanna Koivula, 41 assists (128 games; 1997–2018)
- Highest points per game, over ten games played: Päivi Halonen, 1.38 P/G (13 games; 1982–1990)
- Most penalty minutes: Johanna Koivula, 104 PIM (128 games; 1997–2018)
- Most games played, skater: Johanna Koivula, 128 games (1997–2018)
- Most games played, goaltender:

- Maija Hassinen-Sullanmaa, 26 games (2003–2008)
- Viivi Vartia-Koivisto, 26 games (2008–2015)

- Best save percentage, over five games played: Anni Keisala, .939 Sv% (20 games; 2018–2022)
- Best goals against average (GAA), over five games played: Anni Keisala, 2.21 GAA (20 games; 2018–2022)
- Most shutouts: Anni Keisala, 3 shutouts (20 games; 2018–2022)

== Notable alumni ==
Seasons active with Ilves listed alongside player name.

- Kati Ahonen, 1982–1989
- Anne Haanpää (née Bäckman), 1983–1986, 1987–1991 & 1997–1998
- Maija Hassinen-Sullanmaa, 2003–2008
- Jenni Hiirikoski, 2001–2005, 2007–08 & 2009–10
- Kirsi Hirvonen, 1989–1994
- Venla Hovi, 2003–2010
- Marianne Ihalainen, 1982–2001
- Sari Kärnä, 2009–2018
- Marika Lehtimäki, 1989–1998
- Linda Leppänen (née Välimäki), 2005–2010 & 2017–2019
- Rosa Lindstedt, 2007–2012
- Sari Marjamäki (née Fisk), 1993–2002
- Leena Majaranta, 1982–1990
- Saara Niemi (née Tuominen), 2002–2006 & 2010–11
- Heidi Pelttari, 2002–2006 & 2010–2015
- Tiia Reima, 1988–1994 & 1996–2000
- Mari Saarinen, 1998–2012 & 2014–15
- Hanne Sikiö, 1996–1997 & 2003–04
- Eveliina Similä, 1998–2007
- Liisa-Maria Sneck, 1989–1994
- Jenna Suokko, 2010–2021
- Päivi Virta (prev. Halonen), 1982–1990

=== International players ===
- (Germany) Nina Linde, 2004–2006 & 2009–10
- (United States) Tawni Jaakola (née Mattila), 2010–11
- (Norway) Tuva Schall Mikkelsen, 2021–2023
- (Romania) Nadina Niciu, 2020–21
- (Canada) Patricia Zum Hingst, 1996–1999

== See also ==
- Finland women's national ice hockey team
- Women's ice hockey in Finland
