= Elli Suoranta =

Finnish ice hockey player (born 2002)

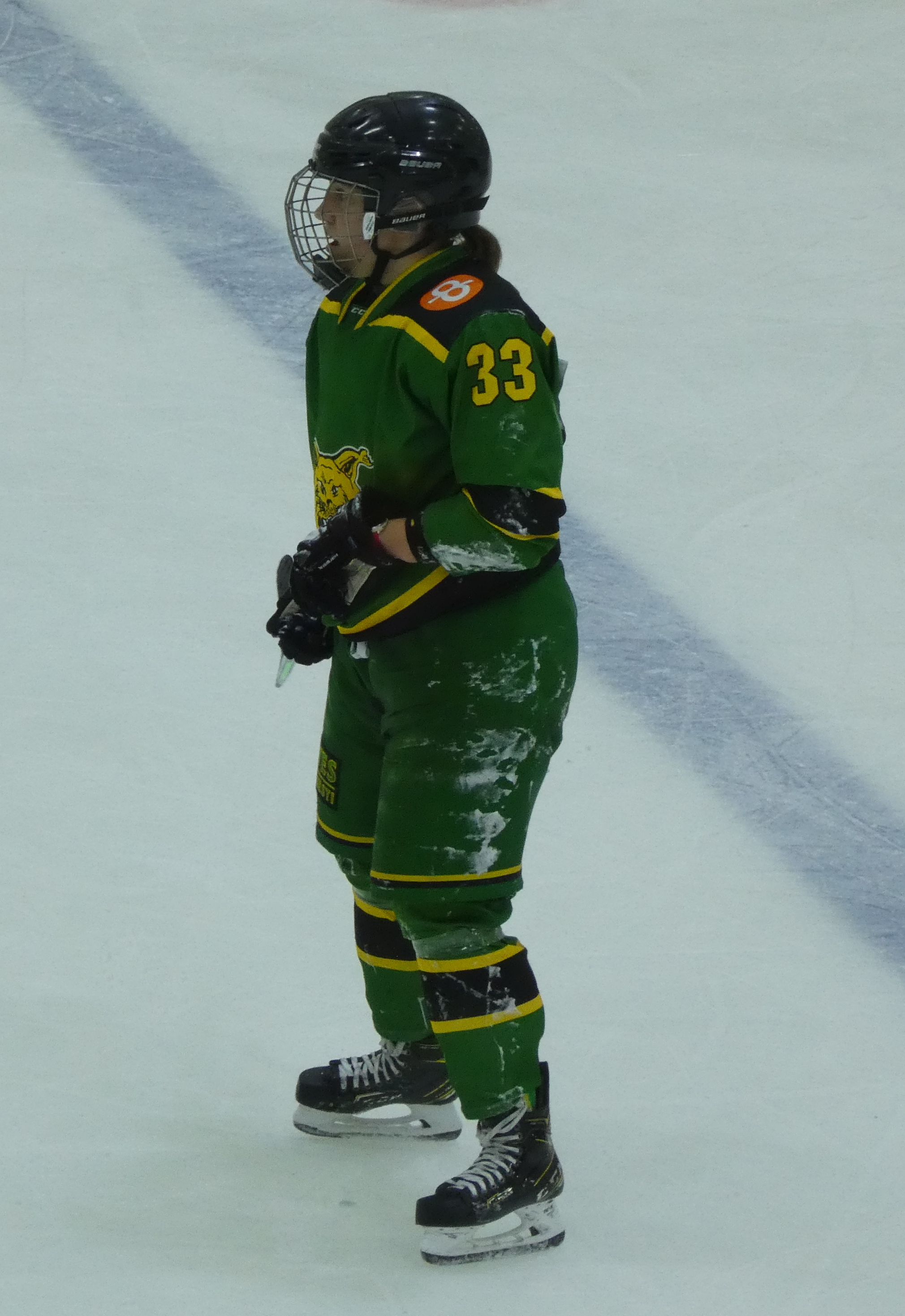
- Suoranta with Ilves in 2022
- Born: 17 June 2002 (age 24) Tampere, Finland
- Height: 1.68 m (5 ft 6 in)
- Weight: 75 kg (165 lb; 11 st 11 lb)
- Position: Defence
- Shoots: Right
- Auroraliiga team Former teams: Ilves Naiset; HPK Kiekkonaiset
- National team: Finland
- Playing career: 2017–present

Elli Suoranta (born 17 June 2002) is a Finnish ice hockey defenceman for Ilves Naiset of the Auroraliiga and a member of Finland women's national ice hockey team. She previously played for HPK Kiekkonaiset.

== Playing career ==
Suoranta began her ice hockey career for Ilves Naiset. After three seasons with Ilves, she joined HPK Kiekkonaiset on 2 May 2020. During the 2020–21 season, she recorded eight goals and six assists in 27 regular season games.

During the 2022–23 season, she recorded 13 goals and 16 assists in 34 regular season games. Following the season she was named to the Naisten Liiga Second All-Star team. During the 2023–24 season, she recorded 13 goals and 15 assists in 27 regular season games. During the 2024–25 season, she recorded four goals and 15 assists in 32 regular season games. She was named Auroraliiga player of the month in November 2024.

== International play ==
Medal record

Representing Finland

World Championship
Bronze medal – third place	2025 Czechia	

World U18 Championship
Bronze medal – third place	2019 Japan	

Suoranta made her international debut for Finland at the 2018 IIHF U18 Women's World Championship, where she was scoreless in six games. She represented Finland at the 2019 IIHF U18 Women's World Championship where she recorded one goal in six games and won a bronze medal. She again represented Finland at the 2020 IIHF U18 Women's World Championship, where she was scoreless in six games.

On 26 March 2025, she was selected to represent Finland at the 2025 IIHF Women's World Championship, where she made her senior national team debut.

On 2 January 2026, she was named to Finland's roster to compete at the 2026 Winter Olympics.

== Career statistics ==
=== Regular season and playoffs ===
			Regular season					Playoffs
Season	Team	League	GP	G	A	Pts	PIM	GP	G	A	Pts	PIM
2017–18	Ilves	NSML	29	1	8	9	22	8	0	0	0	6
2018–19	Ilves	NSML	27	2	5	7	16	7	1	0	1	6
2019–20	Ilves	NSML	30	7	9	16	46	3	0	0	0	2
2020–21	Kiekkonaiset	NSML	27	8	6	14	20	2	0	0	0	12
2021–22	Ilves	NSML	27	5	17	22	35	3	2	0	2	2
2022–23	Ilves	NSML	34	13	16	29	30	3	0	0	0	0
2023–24	Ilves	NSML	27	13	15	28	18	4	0	0	0	4
2024–25	Ilves	Auroraliiga	32	4	15	19	45	10	2	1	3	10
Auroraliiga totals			233	53	91	144	232	40	5	1	6	42

=== International ===
Year	Team	Event	Result	GP	G	A	Pts	PIM
2019	Finland	U18	3rd place, bronze medalist(s)	6	1	0	1	2
2020	Finland	U18	4th	6	0	0	0	6
2025	Finland	WC	3rd place, bronze medalist(s)	7	2	1	3	0
2026	Finland	OG	6th	5	0	0	0	0
Junior totals				12	1	0	1	8
Senior totals				12	2	1	3	0

== Awards and honors ==
Award	Year
Naisten Liiga
All-Star Second Team	2023
