= Piia Lallukka =

Finnish ice hockey player

- Born: 11 June 1985 (age 41) Lappeenranta, Finland
- Height: 1.66 m (5 ft 5 in)
- Weight: 68 kg (150 lb; 10 st 10 lb)
- Position: Forward
- Shot: Left
- Played for: Espoo Blues; Alavuden Peli-Veikot
- National team: Finland
- Playing career: c. 1999–2012
Medal record
World Championship
Bronze medal – third place	2009 Finland
Bronze medal – third place	2008 China

Piia Kotikumpu née Lallukka (born 11 June 1985) is a Finnish retired ice hockey player and former member of the Finnish national ice hockey team. She represented Finland at the IIHF Women's World Championships in 2008 and 2009, winning bronze at both tournaments.

Kotikumpu played eleven seasons in the Naisten SM-sarja, ten seasons with the Espoo Blues Naiset and one season with the women's representative ice hockey team of Alavuden Peli-Veikot (APV). With the Espoo Blues, she won the Finnish Championship eight times – in 2001, 2002, 2003, 2004, 2005, 2007, 2008, and 2009.
