= Anni Keisala =

Finnish ice hockey player (born 1997)

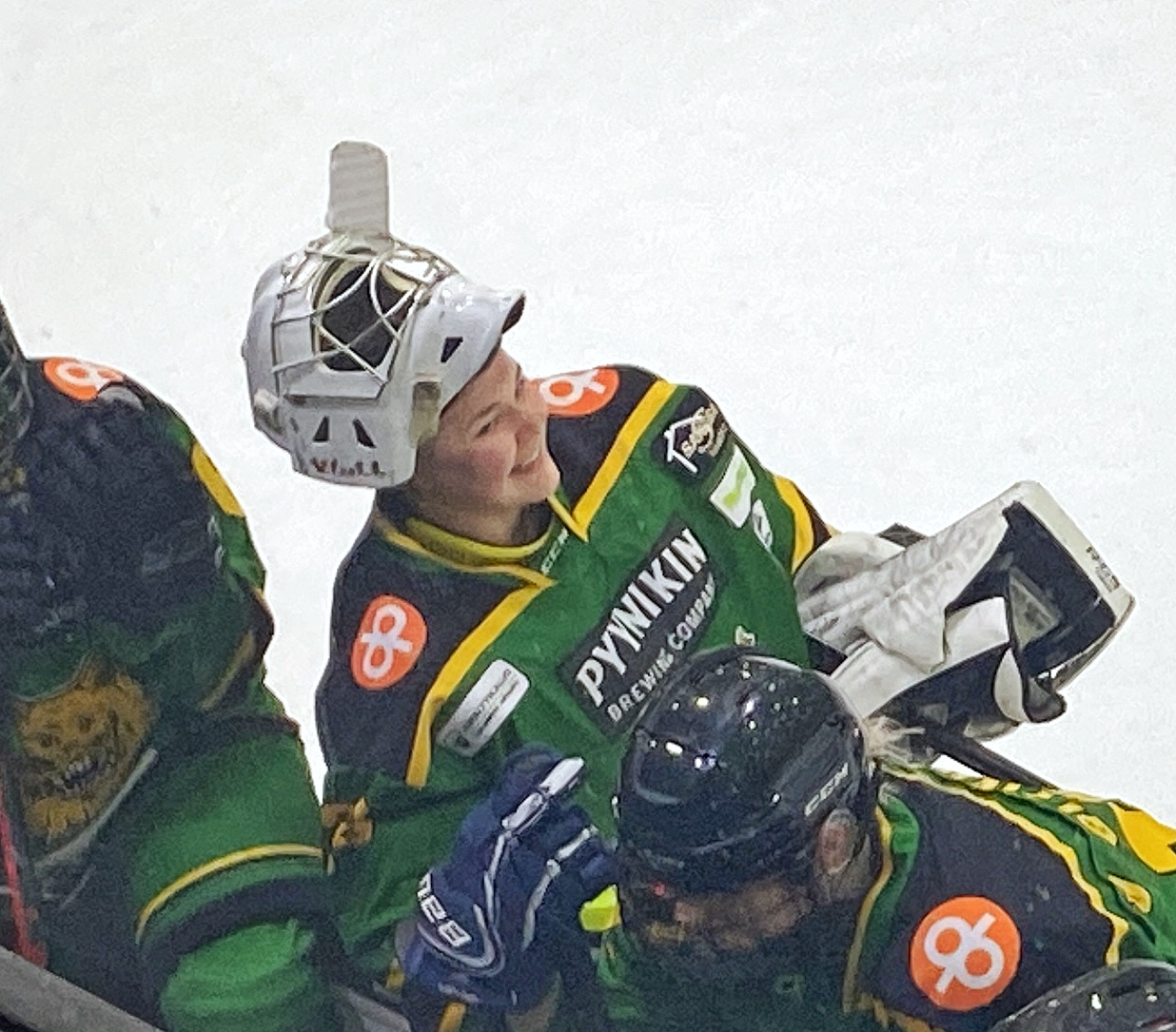
- Keisala with Ilves Tampere in 2022
- Born: 5 April 1997 (age 29) Lohja, Finland
- Height: 1.74 m (5 ft 9 in)
- Weight: 75 kg (165 lb; 11 st 11 lb)
- Position: Goaltender
- Catches: Left
- Auroraliiga team Former teams: HPK Hämeenlinna: HV71; Tampereen Ilves; Oulun Kärpät; Team Oriflame Kuortane; LoKV Lohja
- National team: Finland
- Playing career: 2011–present
Medal record
Olympic Games
Bronze medal – third place	2022 Beijing	Ice hockey
World Championship
Bronze medal – third place	2017 United States
Bronze medal – third place	2021 Canada
Bronze medal – third place	2024 United States
Bronze medal – third place	2025 Czechia

Anni Keisala (born 5 April 1997) is a Finnish ice hockey goaltender for HPK Hämeenlinna of the Auroraliiga and a member of the Finnish national team.

== Playing career ==
Keisala made her senior club debut at age 13 as the third goaltender and an occasional forward on the women's representative team of Lohjan Kisa-Veikot (LoKV) in the 2010–11 season of the Naisten SM-sarja (NSMs; renamed Naisten Liiga (NSML) in 2017). In the following season, the role of starting netminder fell on fourteen-year-old Keisala after the starter and backup goalies from the previous season left LoKV for other NSMs teams. The teen struggled in net behind the worst team in the league, as LoKV lost all 16 games in the preliminaries – managing to record just seven goals in the series – and were relegated to the Naisten I-divisioona after finishing the 15-game promotion/relegation series in last place.

LoKV's fortunes did not improve in the 2012–13 Naisten I-divisioona season. They were further relegated to the third tier Naisten Suomi-sarja at the conclusion of the promotion and relegation series. Keisala continued playing as both a forward and goaltender during the season. Though player statistics for the season are largely incomplete, she served in goal for a minimum of four games of the preliminaries and one game of the promotion and relegation series. She tallied at least 1 goal in the promotion and relegation series while playing as a forward.

Ahead of the 2013–14 season, Keisala relocated 350 kilometres (220 mi) north of her hometown of Lohja to begin attending the Kuortaneen urheilulukio ('Kuortane Sports Academy'). The move was pivotal in her goaltending career, as she returned to playing in the Naisten SM-sarja with Team Oriflame Kuortane, the junior development team of the Finnish Ice Hockey Association, the roster of which featured several future national team talents. She began her rookie season with Team Kuortane as third goaltender behind the 1A/1B duo of Eveliina Suonpää and Tiina Ranne and recorded a below-average .891 save percentage across eight games in the preliminaries. Despite the rocky start, Keisala came into her own during the promotion/relegation series, playing in five of ten games and leading all goaltenders in the series with a stellar .936 save percentage.

She was the recipient of the Tuula Puputti Award as the Goaltender of the Year in the 2014–15 and 2015–16 Naisten SM-sarja seasons while playing with Team Kuortane, and in the 2020–21 Naisten Liiga season, while playing with the Ilves Tampere; she was named to the league's All-Star team in the same three seasons. In 2017, she won the Aurora Borealis Cup with Oulun Kärpät.

== International play ==
As a member of the Finnish national under-18 ice hockey team, she participated in the IIHF U18 Women's World Championship in 2012 and 2013.

Her first match with the senior national team came during the 2015–16 Women's Euro Hockey Tour. She represented Finland at the IIHF Women's World Championship in 2016, where Finland placed fourth, and in 2017, where Finland won bronze.

A series of injuries kept Keisala from being named to the national team for several years until she made her triumphant return to the world stage for the 2021 IIHF Women's World Championship, backstopping the team to a bronze medal and earning selection as Best Goaltender by the tournament directorate.

On 2 January 2026, she was named to Finland's roster to compete at the 2026 Winter Olympics.

== Career statistics ==
=== International ===
Year	Team	Event	Result	GP	TOI	W	L	GA	Sv	SO	SV%	GAA
2014	Finland	WC18	5th	4	243:36	1	3	15	156	0	.912	3.70
2015	Finland	WC18	5th	4	240:00	3	1	5	90	1	.947	1.25
2016	Finland	WC	4th	1	20:00	0	0	1	8	0	.889	3.00
2017	Finland	WC	3rd place, bronze medalist(s)	0	–	–	–	–	–	–	–	–
2021	Finland	WC	3rd place, bronze medalist(s)	5	294:09	3	2	7	129	2	.949	1.43
2022	Finland	OG	3rd place, bronze medalist(s)	7	374:34	3	4	16	173	2	.915	2.56
2022	Finland	WC	6th	6	350:32	2	4	12	171	1	.934	2.05
2023	Finland	WC	5th	4	237:01	3	1	6	69	1	.920	1.52
2024	Finland	WC	3rd place, bronze medalist(s)	1	58:42	0	1	5	40	0	.889	5.11
2025	Finland	WC	3rd place, bronze medalist(s)	1	39:42	0	1	1	21	0	.955	1.51
2026	Finland	OG	6th	1	58:32	0	1	2	22	0	.917	2.05
Junior totals				8	483:36	4	4	20	246	1	.925	2.48
Senior totals				26	1433:12	11	14	50	633	6	.927	2.09

== Awards and honors ==
Award	Year
International
World U18 Top-3 Player on Team	2014, 2015
World Championship Bronze Medal	2017, 2021, 2024
World Championship Best Goalie	2021
World Championship All Star Team	2021
World Championship Top-3 Player on Team	2021, 2022
Olympic Bronze Medal	2022
Auroraliiga
Tuula Puputti Award	2014–15, 2015–16, 2020–21, 2021–22
All-Star	2014–15, 2015–16
Aurora Borealis Cup Champion	2016–17 (Kärpät)
All-Star, First Team	2020–21, 2021–22
Player of the Month	January 2021
Riikka Nieminen Award	2021–22
Kultainen kypärä	2021–22
