= Rosa Lindstedt =

Finnish ice hockey player and coach

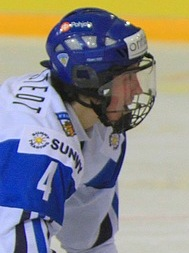
- Lindstedt at the 2011 World Championship
- Born: 24 January 1988 (age 38) Ylöjärvi, Finland
- Height: 1.87 m (6 ft 2 in)
- Weight: 80 kg (176 lb; 12 st 8 lb)
- Position: Defence
- Shot: Left
- Played for: Brynäs IF; HV71; JYP Jyväskylä; Ilves Tampere; Tappara Tampere
- Current SDHL coach: Brynäs IF
- National team: Finland
- Playing career: 2003–2023
- Coaching career: 2023–present
Medal record
Olympic Games
| Bronze medal – third place | 2010 Vancouver | Ice hockey |
| Bronze medal – third place | 2018 Pyeongchang | Ice hockey |
World Championship
| Silver medal – second place | 2019 Finland |
| Bronze medal – third place | 2015 Sweden |
| Bronze medal – third place | 2017 United States |
| Bronze medal – third place | 2021 Canada |

Rosa Lindstedt (born 24 January 1988) is a Finnish ice hockey coach and retired ice hockey defenseman, currently serving as assistant coach to Brynäs IF Dam in the Swedish Women's Hockey League (SDHL). As a player with the Finnish national ice hockey team, she was a three-time Olympian, two-time Olympic bronze medalist, and four-time IIHF Women's World Championship medalist.

== Playing career ==
Her senior club career began at age fourteen with the women's representative team of the Ylöjärven Ilves (Y-Ilves) in the 2002–03 season of the Naisten SM-sarja (renamed Naisten Liiga in 2017), the premier women's ice hockey league in her native Finland. In the Naisten SM-sarja, she went on to play with Tappara Naiset (2003–2007), Tampereen Ilves Naiset (2007–2012), and JYP Jyväskylä Naiset (2012–2016), twice winning the Finnish Championship, with Ilves in 2010 and JYP in 2016.

Lindstedt relocated to the SDHL in the 2016–17 season, signing with HV71 Dam. She played with HV71 for four seasons, serving as an alternate captain in the 2017–18 and 2019–20 seasons. She joined Brynäs IF ahead of the 2020–21 SDHL season and was named captain the following season.

=== International play ===
Lindstedt won bronze medals at the 2010 Winter Olympics and 2018 Winter Olympics, a silver medal at the 2019 IIHF Women's World Championship and bronze medals at the IIHF Women's World Championships in 2015, 2017, and 2021, and a bronze medal at the 2010 Four Nations Cup in St. John's, Newfoundland and Labrador.

== Personal life ==
Lindstedt was born on 24 January 1988 in Ylöjärvi, a town in the Tampere sub-region of southwestern Finland.

She is the grandniece of Marko Asell, an Olympic medalist in Greco-Roman wrestling and member of Finnish Parliament.

== Career statistics ==
=== International ===
| Year | Team | Event | Result | GP | G | A | Pts | PIM |
|---|---|---|---|---|---|---|---|---|
| 2010 | Finland | OG | 3rd place, bronze medalist(s) | 5 | 0 | 1 | 1 | 10 |
| 2011 | Finland | WW | 4th | 6 | 0 | 1 | 1 | 22 |
| 2012 | Finland | WW | 4th | 6 | 1 | 0 | 1 | 6 |
| 2013 | Finland | WW | 4th | 6 | 1 | 0 | 1 | 8 |
| 2014 | Finland | OG | 5th | 5 | 0 | 1 | 1 | 6 |
| 2015 | Finland | WW | 3rd place, bronze medalist(s) | 6 | 3 | 0 | 3 | 8 |
| 2016 | Finland | WW | 4th | 6 | 0 | 1 | 1 | 4 |
| 2017 | Finland | WW | 3rd place, bronze medalist(s) | 6 | 0 | 2 | 2 | 8 |
| 2018 | Finland | OG | 3rd place, bronze medalist(s) | 6 | 0 | 0 | 0 | 2 |
| 2019 | Finland | WW | 2nd place, silver medalist(s) | 7 | 1 | 1 | 2 | 2 |
| 2021 | Finland | WW | 3rd place, bronze medalist(s) | 7 | 0 | 1 | 1 | 2 |
| 2023 | Finland | WW | 5th | 7 | 2 | 1 | 3 | 4 |
| | | | | 73 | 8 | 9 | 17 | 82 |
