= Isa Rahunen =

Finnish ice hockey player

- Born: 16 April 1993 (age 33) Kuopio, Finland
- Height: 1.64 m (5 ft 5 in)
- Weight: 67 kg (148 lb; 10 st 8 lb)
- Position: Defense
- Shot: Left
- Played for: Kärpät Oulu; KalPa Kuopio
- National team: Finland
- Playing career: 2010–2021
Medal record
Olympic Games
| Bronze medal – third place | 2018 Pyeongchang | Ice hockey |
World Championship
| Silver medal – second place | 2019 Finland |
| Bronze medal – third place | 2017 United States |

Isa Rahunen (born 16 April 1993) is a Finnish retired ice hockey player, currently serving as a linesman in the Naisten Liiga. She represented Finland with the national ice hockey team in numerous international competitions and won a silver medal at the 2019 IIHF Women's World Championship and bronze medals at the 2017 IIHF Women's World Championship, the women's ice hockey tournament at the 2018 Winter Olympic Games, and at the Four Nations Cup in 2018.

Rahunen announced her retirement from the national team and from top-level club competition after the 2019–20 Naisten Liiga season, citing a desire to focus more fully on her career as a nurse at the Oulu University Hospital. However, she returned to the Naisten Liiga as an active player for a short period during the later part of the 2020–21 season.
