= Sari Kärnä =

Finnish ice hockey player

- Born: 2 April 1988 (age 38) Oulainen, North Ostrobothnia, Finland
- Height: 1.65 m (5 ft 5 in)
- Weight: 59 kg (130 lb; 9 st 4 lb)
- Position: Right wing
- Shot: Right
- Played for: Tampereen Ilves; Oulun Kärpät; JYP Jyväskylä
- National team: Finland
- Playing career: 2004–2018
Medal record
World Championships
Bronze medal – third place	2017 United States
Bronze medal – third place	2015 Sweden
Universiade
Silver medal – second place	2011 Turkey

Sari Kärnä (born 2 April 1988) is a Finnish retired ice hockey player. She won a silver medal at the 2011 Winter Universiade and bronze medals at the IIHF World Women's Championships in 2015 and 2017 as a member of the Finnish national team.

Her club career was played in the Naisten SM-sarja (renamed Naisten Liiga in 2017) with the Tampereen Ilves Naiset, Oulun Kärpät Naiset, and JYP Jyväskylä Naiset.
