= Kiekko-Espoo Naiset =

Auroraliiga ice hockey club in Espoo, Finland

- City: Espoo, Finland
- League: Auroraliiga
- Founded: 1989; 37 years ago
- Home arena: Tapiolan harjoitusareena
- Colours: Navy, gold, blue
- Head coach: Sami Haapanen
- Captain: Reetta Valkjärvi
- Affiliates: Kiekko-Espoo Akatemia; Kiekko-Espoo Challenger
- Parent club: Kiekko-Espoo Oy
- Website: Official website

Franchise history
- 1989–1992: Espoon Kiekkoseura (EKS)
- 1992–1998: Kiekko-Espoo
- 1998–2016: Espoo Blues
- 2016–17: Espoo United
- 2017–2019: Espoo Blues
- 2019–: Kiekko-Espoo

Championships
- Aurora Borealis Cup: 18 (1999, 2000, 2001, 2002, 2003, 2004, 2005, 2007, 2008, 2009, 2013, 2014, 2015, 2019, 2021, 2022, 2025, 2026)

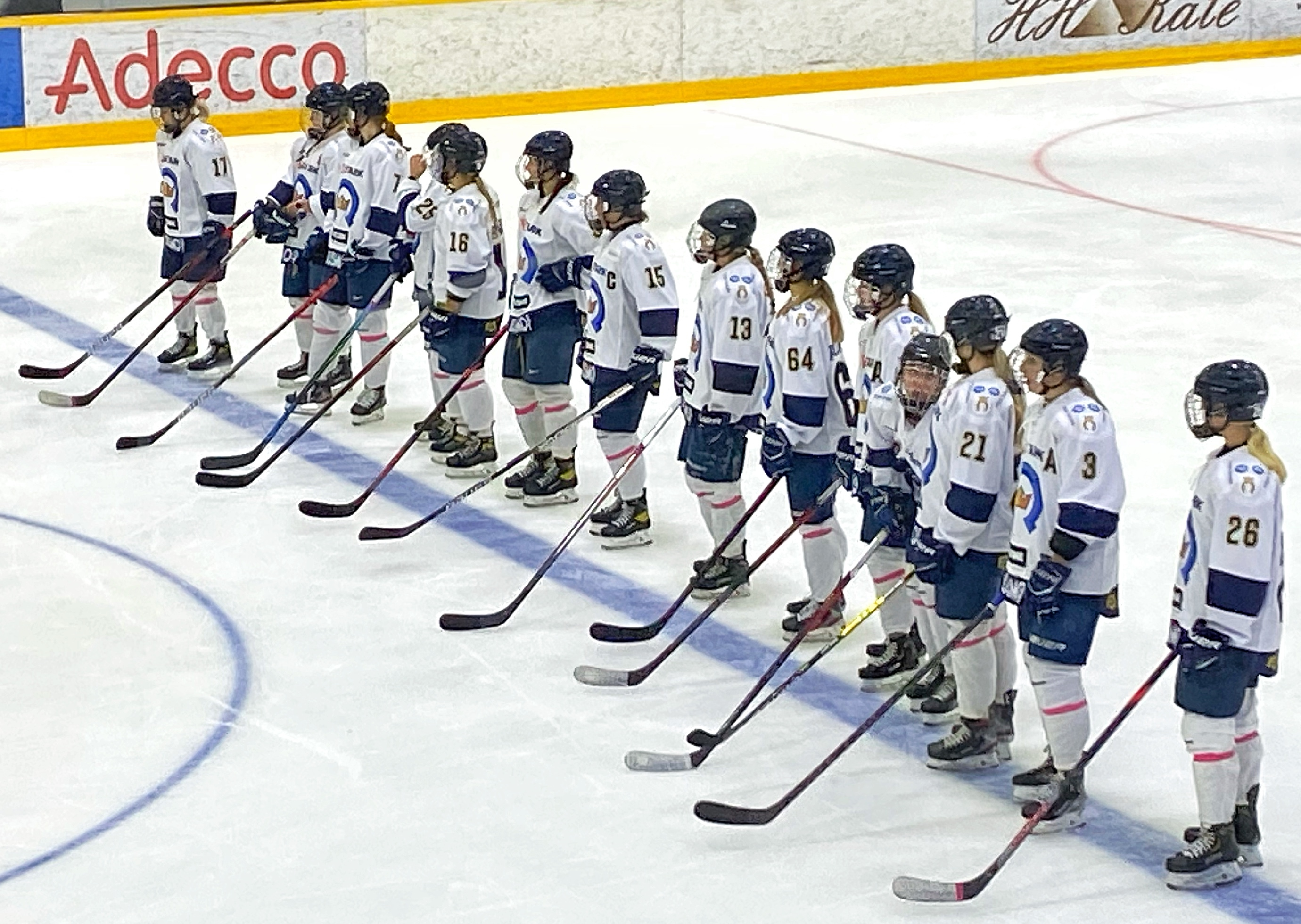
Kiekko-Espoo players in 2021

Kiekko-Espoo Naiset is an ice hockey team in the Auroraliiga. They play in the Tapiola district of Espoo, Finland at the harjoitusareena (lit. 'training arena') of the Tapiolan urheilupuisto. The team was founded as Espoon Kiekkoseura (EKS) in 1989 and has also been known as Espoo Blues Naiset and Espoo United Naiset during its tenure in the Auroraliiga. Kiekko-Espoo have won the Aurora Borealis Cup as the Finnish Champions in women's ice hockey eighteen times, eight more wins than any other team in league history; at least one Finnish Championship medal (gold, silver, or bronze) was won under each of the four names.

The parent club, Kiekko-Espoo Oy, also has a representative men's ice hockey team in the Liiga, a representative ringette team in the Ringeten SM-sarja, and active sections in minor and junior ice hockey and youth ringette.

== History ==
=== EKS, 1990–1992 ===
The team entered Naisten SM-sarja (now Naisten Liiga) in the 1990–91 season under the name Espoon Kiekkoseura or EKS. The two seasons played as EKS were an impressive showing for the newcomers and each resulted in a bronze medal, one in the 1990–91 season after defeating Ässät and one in the 1991–92 season after defeating KalPa.

Several EKS players also played for the bronze medal-winning Finnish women's national team at the 1992 IIHF World Championship including Liisa Karikoski, Katri-Helena Luomajoki, and Hanna Teerijoki.

=== Kiekko-Espoo, 1992–1998 ===
In 1992 EKS was renamed Kiekko-Espoo, the same name as its brother-team in the Liiga. The team continued to be held to bronze or lower finishes, qualifying for five bronze medal series in six years and winning four of them (1993, 1994, 1997, 1998).

=== The Golden Age: Espoo Blues, 1998–2016 ===
The team was renamed Espoo Blues in 1998, continuing the trend of sharing the name of its brother-team in the Liiga, which also renamed Espoo Blues in that year. The name change unwittingly marked the beginning of a "golden age" for the team. Starting with their first SM-sarja gold medal in 1999, after achieving victory over JYP Jyväskylä in the finals, they went on to win a staggering seven consecutive championships (1999–2005) and a total of thirteen championships in eighteen years. The Blues were kept off the SM-sarja medal podium only three times in the 1998–2016 span; in addition to their championship titles, they earned the team's first silver medal in 2009 and two more bronze medals in 2006 and 2016.

The Espoo Blues were also strong competitors at international tournaments in this period, earning medals at six IIHF European Women's Champions Cups: three silver medals (2005, 2007-08, 2009-10) and three bronze medals (2008-09, 2013–14, 2014–15).

=== Espoo United, 2016–17 ===
In March 2016 Jääkiekko Espoo Oy, the parent club of both the Espoo Blues of the Naisten Liiga and Espoo Blues of the Liiga, declared bankruptcy with estimated liabilities of approximately €3 million. In response, Jussi Salonoja, a Finnish millionaire and film director who had previously owned the Espoo Blues franchise from 2002 to 2012, created a new club and organization called Espoo United Oy, stating that he was "committed to supporting hockey in Espoo." The Espoo Blues men's and women's basketball and ice hockey teams would play for Espoo United.

For the 2016–17 season the Espoo United women's ice hockey team played in the Naisten SM-sarja and won silver in the 2017 Finnish Championship. The Espoo United men's team played in the Mestis, the league below the premier-level Liiga, where they won bronze in the playoffs.

On 15 August 2017 Salonoja announced that the Espoo United was abandoning its women's ice hockey and basketball teams for financial reasons. “The reason is twofold: the men's teams' budgets are far greater than those of women's teams, so their running is more demanding, but on the other hand, [the men's teams] are more interesting to sponsors and audiences,” Salonoja said.

The future of women's ice hockey team was left uncertain and many possible solutions were proposed, including being acquired by HIFK or merging with Espoo Blues Juniorit (a junior club with strong ties to the franchise).

=== Espoo Blues part 2, 2017–2019 ===
In September 2017 the Finnish Ice Hockey Association announced that it had supported the creation of an independent association, Ysikoppi ry, to oversee the team and had given its approval for the team to compete in the upcoming 2017–18 season under the name Espoo Blues.

== Season-by-season results ==
This is a partial list of the most recent seasons completed by the franchise. The team was called the “Espoo Blues” during the 2015–16, 2017–18, and 2018–19 seasons; “Espoo United” in the 2016–17 season, and “Kiekko-Espoo” from the 2019–20 season onward.

Note: Finish = Rank at end of regular season; GP = Games played; W = Wins (3 points); OTW = Overtime wins (2 points); OTL = Overtime losses (1 point); L = Losses (0 points); GF = Goals for; GA = Goals against; Pts = Points

Season	League	Regular season										Postseason results
Season	League	Finish	GP	W	OTW	OTL	L	GF	GA	Pts	Top scorer	Postseason results
2015–16	Naisten SM-sarja	2nd	28	19	3	1	5	162	67	64	(Finland) L. Välimäki 70 (31+39)	(bronze) Won bronze medal, 1–0 (Kärpät)
2016–17	Naisten SM-sarja	2nd	28	17	3	1	7	109	68	58	(Finland) L. Välimäki 60 (29+31)	(silver) Lost final, 2–3 (Kärpät)
2017–18	Naisten Liiga	3rd	30	16	2	4	8	125	74	56	(Finland) E. Rakkolainen 27 (16+11)	4th: Lost bronze medal, 0–1 (Kuortane)
2018–19	Naisten Liiga	1st	30	23	1	0	6	164	58	71	(Finland) A. Rajahuhta 66 (36+30)	(gold) Won Championship, 3–0 (Ilves)
2019–20	Naisten Liiga	1st	30	20	3	2	5	145	60	68	(Finland) E. Rakkolainen 42 (13+29)	Won semi-final, 3–0 (Team Kuortane); Finals cancelled due to COVID-19 pandemic
2020–21	Naisten Liiga	1st	27	21	1	0	5	124	46	65	(Finland) N. Laitinen 37 (13+24)	(gold) Won Championship, 3–1 (KalPa)
2021–22	Naisten Liiga	1st	30	27	1	0	2	182	44	83	(Finland) E. Holopainen 56 (29+27)	(gold) Won Championship, 3–2 (HIFK)
2022–23	Naisten Liiga	3rd	36	23	2	1	10	142	70	74	(Finland) A. Montonen 42 (21+21)	(silver) Lost final, 0–3 (HIFK)
2023–24	Naisten Liiga	1st	32	24	2	3	3	168	66	79	(Finland) E. Nuutinen 63 (28+35)	(silver) Lost final, 1–3 (HIFK)
2024–25	Auroraliiga	1st	32	26	3	0	3	168	56	84	(Finland) E. Nuutinen 65 (27+38)	(gold) Won Championship, 4–1 (HPK)
2025–26	Auroraliiga	1st	32	27	2	1	2	169	52	86	(Finland) E. Nuutinen 63 (27+36)	(gold) Won Championship, 4–2 (HPK)

Source(s): Finnish Ice Hockey Association

== Players and personnel ==
=== 2025–26 roster ===
As of 5 April 2026

No.	Nat	Player	Pos	S/G	Age	Acquired	Birthplace
35	(Finland)	Minja Drufva	G	L	24	2018	Lohja, Uusimaa, Finland
13	(Finland)	Ada Eronen	D	L	22	2018	Espoo, Uusimaa, Finland
–	(Finland)	Kaisa Eronen	F	L	26	2025	
19	(Finland)	Tinja Haukijärvi	F	L	28	2017	Järvenpää, Uusimaa, Finland
8	(Finland)	Hilpi Hohti	D	L	17	2025	
27	(Finland)	Riikka Järvinen	D	L	25	2022	Kotka, Kymenlaakso, Finland
17	(Finland)	Nea Katajamäki (A)	F	R	29	2013	Espoo, Uusimaa, Finland
12	(Finland)	Elli Kemppainen	F	L	20	2023	
16	(Finland)	Nea Koskipalo	F	L	22	2022	
62	(Finland)	Nia Käyhty	F	L	21	2023	Nurmijärvi, Uusimaa, Finland
43	(Finland)	Jenina Lampinen	D	R	20	2023	
88	(Finland)	Siru Lehtopelto	D	L	30	2014	Lohja, Uusimaa, Finland
–	(Finland)	Miliana McIntire	F	–	19	2025	
26	(Finland)	Anni Montonen	F	L	26	2024	Espoo, Uusimaa, Finland
20	(Finland)	Nenna Montonen	F	L	19	2025	
61	(Finland)	Emma Nuutinen	F	L	29	2023	Vantaa, Uusimaa, Finland
33	(Finland)	Heta Paasilinna	D	L	21	2020	
31	(Finland)	Tiia Pajarinen	G	L	28	2019	Polvijärvi, North Karelia, Finland
11	(Finland)	Karoliina Rantamäki	F	L	48	2024	Vantaa, Uusimaa, Finland
89	(Finland)	Riia Saarni	D	R	18	2023	Lohja, Uusimaa, Finland
23	(Finland)	Elsa Talvitie (A)	F	L	21	2020	
5	(Finland)	Vilma Timonen	D	L	21	2023	
21	(Finland)	Aliisa Toivonen	F	L	25	2023	
15	(Finland)	Minttu Tuominen	D	R	36	2026	Helsinki, Uusimaa, Finland
87	(Finland)	Lisette Täks	D	L	23	2022	Tartu, Estonia
20	(Finland)	Reetta Valkjärvi (C)	D	L	30	2015	Hollola, Päijät-Häme, Finland
28	(Finland)	Henni Virtanen	D	L	23	2022	Lohja, Uusimaa, Finland
–	(Finland)	Roosa Vuosalmi	F	L	20	2025	Vantaa, Uusimaa, Finland
25	(Finland)	Kiira Yrjänen	F	L	24	2025	Riihimäki, Kanta-Häme, Finnish

Coaching staff and team personnel

- Head coach: Sami Haapanen
- Assistant coach: Casimir Öhman
- Assistant coach: Emmi Polviander (née Leinonen)
- Goaltending coach: Risto Jaakkola
- Conditioning coach: Minttu Tuominen
- Team manager: Niklas Ekroos
- Equipment manager: Marko Ahlroth

=== Team captaincy history ===
- Katri-Helena Luomajoki, 1997–98
- Essi Sievers, 2007–2009
- Emma Terho (née Laaksonen), 2009–2011
- Essi Sievers, 2011–12
- Emma Terho, 2012–2014
- Minttu Tuominen, 2014–2016
- Linda Välimäki, 2016–17
- Minttu Tuominen, 2017–2020
- Annina Rajahuhta, 2020–21
- Minttu Tuominen, 2021–22
- Emmi Rakkolainen, 2022–23
- Reetta Valkjärvi, 2023–

=== Head coaches ===
- Johanna Ikonen, 1998–99
- Jari Kalho, 2000–01
- Hannu Saintula, 2001–02
- Jari Peltonen, 2002–2006
- Sami Haapanen, 2008–2011
- Kai Jansson, 2011–2013
- Sami Haapanen, 2013–

== Team honours ==
=== Finnish Championship ===
- (gold) Aurora Borealis Cup (17): 1999, 2000, 2001, 2002, 2003, 2004, 2005, 2007, 2008, 2009, 2013, 2014, 2015, 2019, 2021, 2022, 2025, 2026
- (silver) Runners-up (3): 2010, 2017, 2023, 2024
- (bronze) Third Place (8): 1991, 1992, 1993, 1994, 1997, 1998, 2006, 2016

=== IIHF European Women's Champions Cup ===
- (silver) Silver (3): 2005, 2007–08, 2009–10
- (bronze) Bronze (3): 2008–09, 2013–14, 2014–15

== Franchise records and leaders ==
Players holding franchise records per documentation available from the 1992–93 Naisten SM-sarja season through the conclusion of the 2024–25 Auroraliiga season. Data from the 1990–91 and 1991–92 seasons is incomplete and has not been included.

As of February 2025

=== Single-season records ===
- Most goals: Karoliina Rantamäki, 39 goals (24 games; 2002–03)
- Most assists: Minttu Tuominen, 50 assists (30 games; 2018–19)
- Most points: Michelle Karvinen, 81 points (22 games; 2008–09)
- Most points, defenseman: Minttu Tuominen, 63 points (30 games; 2018–19)
- Most penalty minutes: Tea Villilä, 76 PIM (16 games; 2008–09)
- Best save percentage: Two goaltenders, .954 SVS%

- Noora Räty (19 games; 2006–07)
- Isabella Portnoj (19 games; 2013–14)

- Best goals against average: Minja Drufva, 1.20 GAA (12 games; 2021–22)
- Most shutouts: Jenna Silvonen, 6 shutouts (28 games; 2017–18)

=== Career records ===
Only skaters appearing in more than thirty games and goaltenders appearing in more than ten games with Kiekko-Espoo are included.

- Most goals: Karoliina Rantamäki, 368 goals (358 games; 1992–2007, 2024–25)
- Most assists: Petra Vaarakallio, 351 assists (286 games; 1992–1994, 1995–2006)
- Most points: Karoliina Rantamäki, 672 points (338 games; 1992–2007, 2024–25)
- Most points, defenseman: Minttu Tuominen, 409 points (271 games; 2006–2009, 2013–2016, 2017–2020, 2021–22, 2023–2025)
- Best points per game: Michelle Karvinen, 3.667 points per game (39 games; 2007–2009)
- Most career penalty minutes: Tea Villilä, 455 penalty minutes (261 games; 2008–2010, 2016–2025)
- Best save percentage: Isabella Portnoj, .938 SVS% (109 games; 2010–2017
- Best goals against average: Erika Jaskari, 1.66 (25 games; 2017–2021)

=== All-time scoring leaders ===
Abbreviations: Pos = Position; GP = Games played; G = Goals; A = Assists; Pts = Points; P/G = Points per game

Points
Player	Pos	GP	G	A	Pts	P/G
Karoliina Rantamäki	F	358	368	304	672	1.88
Petra Vaarakallio	F	286	280	351	631	2.21
Annina Rajahuhta	F	232	192	234	426	1.84
Minttu Tuominen	D	271	130	279	409	1.51
Linda Välimäki	F	151	174	186	360	2.38
Emma Nuutinen	F	153	140	165	305	1.99
Oona Parviainen	F	223	119	143	262	1.17
Piia Lallukka	F	195	101	138	239	1.23
Tinja Haukijärvi	F	223	122	114	236	1.06
Emma Terho	D	262	54	173	227	0.87

== Notable alumnae ==
Seasons active with Kiekko-Espoo listed alongside player name.

- Kati Ahonen, 1996–1999
- Mira Huhta, 2013–2019
- Sanna Kanerva, 1998–2001
- Liisa Karikoski, 1990–1994
- Piia Kotikumpu (née Lallukka), 2000–2009 & 2011–12
- Nelli Laitinen, 2017–2022
- Linda Leppänen (née Välimäki), 2010–2017
- Pia Lund, 2006–2013
- Katri-Helena Luomajoki, 1990–1994 & 1995–2002
- Sari Marjamäki (née Fisk), 2003–2007
- Terhi Mertanen, 2001–02, 2008–2011, 2012–13 & 2014–15
- Oona Parviainen, 1999–2010
- Annina Rajahuhta, 2008–09 & 2012–2021
- Tiia Reima, 2009–2011
- Meeri Räisänen, 2008–2011
- Noora Räty, 2005–2009
- Maria Saarni (née Selin), 1994–2000
- Essi Sievers, 2002–2010 & 2011–2014
- Jenna Silvonen, 2015–2019 & 2022–23
- Hanna Teerijoki, 1991–1994
- Emma Terho (née Laaksonen), 1996–2000, 2004–2007 & 2008–2015
- Noora Tulus, 2013–2016
- Minttu Tuominen, 2006–2009, 2013–2016, 2017–2020, 2021–22 & 2023–2025
- Satu Tuominen, 2001–2009
- Petra Vaarakallio, 1992–2006
- Päivi Virta (previously Halonen), 1997–2006
- Marjo Voutilainen, 2004–2008
- Heidi Wiik, 1999–2005

=== International players ===
- (Sweden) Susanne Ceder, 1998–2000
- (Sweden) Minna Dunder, 1993–94
- (Japan) Moeko Fujimoto, 2014–15
- (Slovakia) Nikola Gápová, 2015–2018
- (Canada) Sheila Gagnon, 2001–02 & 2008–09
- (China) Jin Fengling, 2005–06
- (Sweden) Marianne Mattila, 1996–1998
- (Canada) Danielle Rozon, 2017–18
- (China) Sun Rui, 2005–06
- (Poland) Julia Zielińska, 2019–2024
- (Russia) Arina Zvezdina, 2011–12
