= Heidi Pelttari =

Finnish ice hockey player

- Born: 2 August 1985 (age 41) Tampere, Finland
- Height: 165 cm (5 ft 5 in)
- Weight: 67 kg (148 lb; 10 st 8 lb)
- Position: Defense
- Shot: Left
- Played for: Tampereen Ilves; Minnesota Duluth Bulldogs
- National team: Finland
- Playing career: 2002–2015
Medal record
Olympic Games
Bronze medal – third place	2010 Vancouver	Ice hockey
World Championship
Bronze medal – third place	2008 China
Bronze medal – third place	2009 Finland

Heidi Marianne Pelttari (born 2 August 1985) is a Finnish retired ice hockey defenceman and former member of the Finnish national ice hockey team. She represented Finland in the women's ice hockey tournament at both the 2006 and 2010 Winter Olympic Games.

Pelttari was a stand out defensemen for the Minnesota Duluth Bulldogs women's ice hockey program and played her club career with the Tampereen Ilves of the Naisten SM-sarja.

== Career stats ==
=== Minnesota Duluth ===
- Note: GP= Games played; G= Gaols; AST= Assists; PTS = Points; PPG = Power Play Goals; SHG = Short handed Goals

Year	GP	G	AST	PTS	PPG	SHG
2006–07	15	0	2	2	0	0
2007–08	39	4	23	27	3	0
2008–09	39	4	23	27	3	0

=== Finland ===
Event	Goals	Assists	Points	Shots	PIM	+/-
2010 Winter Olympics	1	2	3	2	13	−4
