= List of Olympic women's ice hockey players for Finland =

Finnish Olympic women's ice hockey players

Finnish Olympic women's national ice hockey team
- Head coach: ~~Pasi Mustonen (2022)~~; Juuso Toivola (2022)
- Assistants: Kari Eloranta (2022)
- Captain: Jenni Hiirikoski (2022)
- Most games: Karoliina Rantamäki (27)
- Top scorer: Riikka Sallinen (12 goals); Michelle Karvinen (12 goals)
- Most points: Riikka Sallinen (25 points)

First international
- Sweden 0 – 6 Finland (Nagano, Japan; 8 February 1998)

Biggest win
- Finland 11 – 1 Japan (Nagano, Japan; 9 February 1998)

Biggest defeat
- Canada 11 – 1 Finland (Beijing, China; 4 February 2022)

Olympics
- Appearances: 7 (first in 1998)
- Medals: (bronze) Bronze (1998, 2010, 2018, 2022)

International record (W–L–T)
- 20-19-0

A women's ice hockey tournament has been played at every Winter Olympics since its introduction at the 1998 Nagano Olympics. The International Olympic Committee (IOC) voted to include women's hockey as an Olympic event in July 1992.

Finland has won four Olympic bronze medals in women's hockey, including the first bronze medal in women's ice hockey at the Winter Olympic games.

== Key ==
Abbreviations
Abbreviation/ Notes	Definition
Captain	Player served as team captain
Alternate	Player served as alternate captain
IIHFHOF	IIHF Hall of Fame
HHOFF	Hockey Hall of Fame Finland

== Goaltenders ==
Note: GP = Games played; Min, TOI = Minutes played; W = Wins; L = Losses; T,T/OT = Ties; GA = Goals-against; GAA = Goals-against average; SO = Shutouts; SV% = Save percentage;

Finnish Olympic Goaltenders
Player	Olympics	GP	W	L	T	Min	GA	GAA	Medals	Notes	Ref(s).
Minna-Monica Halonen	2002	0	0	0	0	00:00	0	0.00			
Maija Hassinen-Sullanmaa	2006	4	1	2	0	196:00	0	3.38	(bronze) Bronze (2010)		
Anni Keisala	2022	7	3	4	2	374:34	16	2.56	(bronze) Bronze (2022)		
Mira Kuisma	2010	0	0	0	0	00:00	0	0.00	(bronze) Bronze (2010)		
Eveliina Mäkinen	2014, 2018, 2022	0	0	0	0	00:00	0	0.00	(bronze) Bronze (2018); (bronze) Bronze (2022)		
Tuula Puputti	1998, 2002	10	5	4	2	571:00	22	2.32	(bronze) Bronze (1998)		
Meeri Räisänen	2014, 2018, 2022	1	0	1	0	40:00	7	10.50	(bronze) Bronze (2018); (bronze) Bronze (2022)		
Noora Räty	2006, 2010, 2014, 2018	20	10	9	1	1122:00	50	2.67	(bronze) Bronze (2010); (bronze) Bronze (2018)		
Liisa-Maria Sneck	1998	2	1	1	0	89:00	4	2.70	(bronze) Bronze (1998)		
Anna Vanhatalo	2010	0	0	0	0	00:00	0	0.00	(bronze) Bronze (2010)		

== Skaters ==
Note: GP = Games played; G = Goals; A = Assists; Pts = Points; PIM = Penalty minutes;

Finnish Olympic Skaters
Player	Olympics	GP	G	A	Pts	PIM	Medals	Notes	Ref(s).
Pirjo Ahonen	2002	5	0	0	0	2			
Sari Fisk	1998, 2002, 2006	16	2	7	9	8	(bronze) Bronze (1998)	Captain (2006) HHOFF (2014)	
Sanni Hakala	2018, 2022	13	2	0	2	4	(bronze) Bronze (2018); (bronze) Bronze (2022)		
Anne Helin	2010	5	0	0	0	0	(bronze) Bronze (2010)		
Jenni Hiirikoski	2010, 2014, 2018, 2022	24	3	11	14	12	(bronze) Bronze (2010); (bronze) Bronze (2018); (bronze) Bronze (2022)	Captain (2014, 2018, 2022); Alternate (2010)	
Satu Hoikkala	2002, 2006	10	0	2	2	6			
Elisa Holopainen	2022	7	1	3	4	4	(bronze) Bronze (2022)		
Venla Hovi	2010, 2014, 2018	17	4	3	7	12	(bronze) Bronze (2010)		
Satu Huotari	1998	6	0	1	1	4	(bronze) Bronze (1998)		
Kirsi Hänninen	1998, 2002	11	4	6	10	6	(bronze) Bronze (1998)	Alternate (1998); HHOFF (2018)	
Marianne Ihalainen	1998	5	0	0	0	0	(bronze) Bronze (1998)	Captain (1998); HHOFF (2007)	
Johanna Ikonen	1998	6	4	1	5	6	(bronze) Bronze (1998)		
Mira Jalosuo	2014, 2018	11	0	1	1	8	(bronze) Bronze (2018)		
Sini Karjalainen	2022	7	0	0	0	2	(bronze) Bronze (2022)		
Michelle Karvinen	2010, 2014, 2018, 2022	24	12	11	23	12	(bronze) Bronze (2010); (bronze) Bronze (2018); (bronze) Bronze (2022)	Alternate (2018, 2022)	
Satu Kiipeli	2006	5	0	0	0	2			
Anna Kilponen	2014	6	0	2	2	2			
Kati Kovalainen	2006	5	0	1	1	6		Alternate (2006)	
Sari Krooks	1998	6	2	2	4	12	(bronze) Bronze (1998)	HHOFF (2009)	
Hanna Kuoppala	2006	5	0	0	0	4			
Nelli Laitinen	2022	7	2	5	7	4	(bronze) Bronze (2022)		
Sanna Lankosaari	1998	5	2	1	3	4	(bronze) Bronze (1998)		
Marika Lehtimäki	1998	5	2	3	5	0	(bronze) Bronze (1998)		
Katja Lehto	1998	6	1	3	4	12	(bronze) Bronze (1998)		
Linda Leppänen	2010, 2014, 2018	17	2	6	8	8	(bronze) Bronze (2010); (bronze) Bronze (2018)		
Julia Liikala	2022	7	0	0	0	0	(bronze) Bronze (2022)		
Rosa Lindstedt	2010, 2014, 2018	16	0	2	2	18	(bronze) Bronze (2010); (bronze) Bronze (2018)		
Terhi Mertanen	2002, 2006, 2010	15	0	1	1	14	(bronze) Bronze (2010)		
Saara Niemi	2006, 2010	10	1	4	5	4	(bronze) Bronze (2010)	Alternate (2010)	
Petra Nieminen	2018, 2022	13	6	7	13	6	(bronze) Bronze (2018); (bronze) Bronze (2022)	Alternate (2022)	
Tanja Niskanen	2018, 2022	13	0	2	2	12	(bronze) Bronze (2018); (bronze) Bronze (2022)		
Emma Nuutinen	2014, 2018	12	2	1	3	4	(bronze) Bronze (2018)		
Jenniina Nylund	2022	7	1	0	1	0	(bronze) Bronze (2022)		
Oona Parviainen	2002, 2006	10	1	0	1	2			
Mari Pehkonen	2006	5	3	0	3	2			
Heidi Pelttari	2006, 2010	10	2	4	6	6	(bronze) Bronze (2010)		
Mariia Posa	2010	0	0	0	2	5	(bronze) Bronze (2010)		
Marja-Helena Pälvilä	1998, 2002, 2006	16	1	0	1	4	(bronze) Bronze (1998)		
Isa Rahunen	2018	6	0	2	2	6	(bronze) Bronze (2018)		
Annina Rajahuhta	2010, 2014, 2018	17	0	1	1	4	(bronze) Bronze (2010); (bronze) Bronze (2018)		
Sanni Rantala	2022	7	1	1	2	8	(bronze) Bronze (2022)		
Karoliina Rantamäki	1998, 2002, 2006, 2010, 2014	27	6	6	12	6	(bronze) Bronze (1998); (bronze) Bronze (2010)		
Tiia Reima	1998, 2002	9	4	2	6	8	(bronze) Bronze (1998)	HHOFF (2015)	
Katja Riipi	1998, 2002	11	4	5	9	10	(bronze) Bronze (1998)	HHOFF (2017)	
Saila Saari	2018	6	0	0	0	0	(bronze) Bronze (2018)		
Mari Saarinen	2006, 2010	10	1	2	3	6	(bronze) Bronze (2010)		
Maria Saarni	1998	5	0	1	1	2	(bronze) Bronze (1998)		
Riikka Sallinen	1998, 2002, 2014, 2018	23	12	13	25	6	(bronze) Bronze (1998); (bronze) Bronze (2018)	Alternate (2018); IIHFHOF (2010); HHOFF (2007)	
Päivi Salo	1998, 2002	11	0	0	0	16	(bronze) Bronze (1998)		
Henna Savikuja	2002	5	0	0	0	4			
Ronja Savolainen	2018, 2022	13	0	3	3	6	(bronze) Bronze (2018); (bronze) Bronze (2022)		
Hanne Sikiö	2002	5	2	0	2	2			
Eveliina Similä	2006	5	0	0	0	0			
Sofianna Sundelin	2022	7	0	0	0	2	(bronze) Bronze (2022)		
Sara Säkkinen	2018	6	0	0	0	6	(bronze) Bronze (2018)		
Nora Tallus	2006	5	0	1	1	4			
Vilma Tanskanen	2014	6	0	0	0	0			
Susanna Tapani	2014, 2018, 2022	19	9	9	18	6	(bronze) Bronze (2018); (bronze) Bronze (2022)		
Saija Tarkki	2002, 2006, 2010, 2014	21	2	2	4	26	(bronze) Bronze (2010)	|	
Emma Terho	1998, 2002, 2006, 2010, 2014	25	2	1	3	26	(bronze) Bronze (1998); (bronze) Bronze (2010)	Captain (2010); Alternate (2006); HHOFF (2019)	
Nina Tikkinen	2010, 2014	11	2	0	2	2	(bronze) Bronze (2010)		
Noora Tulus	2018, 2022	13	0	7	7	2	(bronze) Bronze (2018); (bronze) Bronze (2022)		
Minnamari Tuominen	2010, 2014, 2018, 2022	24	3	4	7	10	(bronze) Bronze (2010); (bronze) Bronze (2018); (bronze) Bronze (2022)		
Satu Tuominen	2006	5	0	0	0	2			
Petra Vaarakallio	1998, 2002	11	2	2	4	18	(bronze) Bronze (1998)		
Viivi Vainikka	2022	7	2	1	3	2	(bronze) Bronze (2022)		
Sanni Vanhanen	2022	7	0	1	1	0	(bronze) Bronze (2022)		
Emilia Vesa	2022	7	0	0	0	0	(bronze) Bronze (2022)		
Ella Viitasuo	2018, 2022	13	0	0	0	0	(bronze) Bronze (2018); (bronze) Bronze (2022)		
Tea Villilä	2014	6	0	0	0	4			
Marjo Voutilainen	2002, 2010	10	1	1	2	6	(bronze) Bronze (2010)		

== See also ==
- Finland women's national ice hockey team
- List of Finland women's national ice hockey team rosters
- List of Olympic men's ice hockey players for Finland
