= Emma Laaksonen Award =

Finnish ice hockey award

Emma Laaksonen Award Emma Laaksonen -palkinto (Finnish)
- Sport: Ice hockey
- League: Auroraliiga
- Awarded for: Fair play player
- Presented by: Finnish Ice Hockey Association

History
- First award: 2011
- First winner: Christine Posa
- Most wins: Johanna Juutilainen (3)
- Most recent: Johanna Juutilainen, 2026

The Emma Laaksonen Award (Finnish: Emma Laaksonen -palkinto) is an ice hockey trophy awarded by the Finnish Ice Hockey Association to the fair play player of the year of the Auroraliiga (previously called the Naisten SM-sarja and Naisten Liiga). The award recognizes a player who best contributes to the scoring of their team while "playing fair," that is to say, while incurring very few penalty minutes. Winners typically exceed one point per game and are issued fewer than ten penalty minutes (PIM) over a full season.

It is named after defenseman Emma Terho (née Laaksonen), former captain of the Finnish women's national ice hockey team and general manager of Kiekko-Espoo Naiset. Despite being named after a defenseman, it has only ever been awarded to forwards.

The Emma Laaksonen Award was first awarded, to Christine Posa of the Espoo Blues in 2011. Johanna Juutilainen and Saila Saari are the only players to have received the trophy more than once. Saari was awarded in 2013, while playing with JYP Jyväskylä, and in 2018, while playing with Oulun Kärpät. Juutilainen holds the record for times awarded, with three. She was the trophy recipient while playing with KalPa Kuopio in both 2021 and 2024, and with Ilves Tampere in 2026. Emilia Vesa, recipient for the 2018–19 season, and Anni Montonen, recipient for the 2024–25 season, are the only honorees to have won the trophy while averaging less than one point per game. In 2022, French national team player Emmanuelle Passard became the first international to win the award and was also the first recipient to have incurred zero penalty minutes in the award season.

The trophy is currently held by Johanna Juutilainen, who won the award while playing with Ilves] during the 2025–26 Auroraliiga season.

== Award winners ==
Season	Winner	Team	GP	Pts	PIM
2010–11	Christine Posa	Espoo Blues	26	28	4
2011–12	Satu Niinimäki	Ilves Tampere	19	28	2
2012–13	Saila Saari	JYP Jyväskylä	28	39	2
2013–14	Tiina Paananen	JYP Jyväskylä	28	31	8
2014–15	Noora Tulus	Espoo Blues	25	38	8
2015–16	Sanni Hakala	JYP Jyväskylä	23	36	4
2016–17	Tanja Niskanen	KalPa Kuopio	22	36	6
2017–18	Saila Saari	Kärpät Oulu	26	44	8
2018–19	Emilia Vesa	Team Kuortane	28	21	4
2019–20	Viivi Vainikka	Team Kuortane	30	52	6
2020–21	Johanna Juutilainen	KalPa Kuopio	25	35	2
2021–22	Emmanuelle Passard	IFK Helsinki	28	33	0
2022–23	Jenna Hietala	KalPa Kuopio	35	50	6
2023–24	Johanna Juutilainen	KalPa Kuopio	32	46	2
2024–25	Anni Montonen	Kiekko-Espoo	32	31	2
2025–26	Johanna Juutilianen	Ilves Tampere	32	39	2

Source: Elite Prospects

== All time award recipients ==
Player	Wins	Years won
Johanna Juutilainen	3	2021
Johanna Juutilainen	3	2024
Johanna Juutilainen	3	2026
Saila Saari	2	2013
Saila Saari	2	2018
Sanni Hakala	1	2016
Jenna Hietala	1	2023
Anni Montonen	1	2025
Satu Niinimaki	1	2012
Tanja Niskanen	1	2017
Tiina Paananen	1	2014
Emmanuelle Passard	1	2022
Christine Posa	1	2011
Noora Tulus	1	2015
Viivi Vainikka	1	2020
Emilia Vesa	1	2019
