= 2019–20 Naisten Liiga season =

37th season of the Naisten Liiga

- League: Naisten Liiga
- Sport: Ice hockey
- Duration: 7 September 2019 – 12 March 2020
- Games: 30
- Teams: 10 in Preliminary series 12 in Divisional series

Regular Season
- Season champions: Kiekko-Espoo
- Runners-up: Kärpät Oulu
- Season MVP: Tanja Niskanen (KalPa)
- Top scorer: Saila Saari (Kärpät)

Aurora Borealis Cup
- Champions: not awarded

Naisten Liiga seasons
- 2018–19 2020–21

The 2019–20 Naisten Liiga season was the thirty-seventh season of the Naisten Liiga, the premier level of women's ice hockey in Finland, since the league’s establishment in 1982.

On 12 March 2020, the Finnish Ice Hockey Association cancelled the postseason in response to public health concerns surrounding the COVID-19 pandemic. The 2020 Aurora Borealis Cup Final between Kiekko-Espoo and KalPa was scheduled to begin on 14 March 2020. As a result of the cancellation, the 2019–20 season became the first and only Naisten Liiga season to date in which the Finnish Championship was not awarded.

== League changes ==
=== Season format ===
The season format designated for the 2019–20 season was a modified version of the format established for the 2018–19 season. While the opening series remained unchanged, the divisional series was expanded to six teams in each division. To fill the two empty slots of the Lower Division, two teams from the Naisten Mestis were added to the Liiga for the divisional series and onward. The playoff format was modified to account for the increased number of teams; eight teams would qualify for the playoffs rather than the previous six. This change allowed for a traditional single-elimination tournament to be played from the quarterfinal stage rather than having the top two teams automatically progress to the semifinal round.

Preliminaries

The preliminaries (Finnish: Alkusarja, lit. 'initial or opening series') are played as a double round-robin plus a two-game Opening Weekend Tournament; each of the ten teams plays a total of twenty matches. Points are awarded by match outcome: three points for a regulation win, two points for an overtime win, one point for an overtime loss, and no points/zero points for a regulation loss. The points earned in the opening series determine which division a team will be placed in for the continuation of the season.

Regular season

The regular season, also called the upper division series (Finnish: Ylempi jatkosarja), is played by the top six teams from the preliminaries. Like the preliminaries, the series is played as a double round-robin, with each team playing a total of ten games. All six teams in the regular season are guaranteed placement in the playoffs; the cumulative points earned in the thirty games of the preliminaries and regular season are used to establish the teams' playoff berths, from first to sixth. Only points scored in the upper division series are considered when determining the players who will receive the Marianne Ihalainen Award, for most regular season points earned, and the Tiia Reima Award, for most regular season goals scored; players in the lower division series are ineligible for the awards.

Lower division series

The bottom four teams from the preliminary series move on to the lower division series (Finnish: Alempi jatkosarja), where they are joined by the top two teams from the cross-qualifiers (Finnish: Ristiinkarsinta) of the Naisten Mestis, the league directly below Naisten Liiga. The lower division series teams compete for the seventh and eighth seed positions in the playoffs; only the top two ranked teams from the lower division earn placement in the playoffs. Unlike the regular season/upper division series, all lower division teams start with zero points; only points earned in the series are considered when the teams are ranked.

Qualifiers

The lower division teams ranked third through sixth continue on to the qualifiers (Finnish: Karsintasarja). The points earned in the six qualifying series games are added to the points totals from the lower division series. The two teams with the highest point totals qualify for the following Naisten Liiga season, the two lower ranked teams are relegated to or remain in the Naisten Mestis for the following season.

== Teams ==
Location of teams in Naisten Liiga 2019–20

Team name	Full team name	Location	Head coach	Home venue	Captain
HIFK	Stadin Gimmat or HIFK Naiset	Helsinki	Saara Niemi	Malmin jäähalli	Karoliina Rantamäki
HPK	Hämeenlinnan Pallokerho Kiekkonaiset	Hämeenlinna	Katja Pasanen	Metritriski Areena	Riikka Noronen
Ilves	Tampereen Ilves Naiset	Tampere	Ville Tolvanen	Tesoman jäähalli	Johanna Juutilainen
KalPa	Kalevan Pallo Naiset	Kuopio	Marjo Voutilainen	Olvi Areena	Emma Ritari
Kiekko-Espoo	Kiekko-Espoo Naiset	Espoo	Sami Haapanen	Tapiolan harjoitussaree	Minttu Tuominen
Kärpät	Oulun Kärpät Naiset	Oulu	Janne Salmela	Oulun Energia Areena	Saila Saari
Lukko	Rauman Lukko Naiset	Rauma	Marko Toivonen	Kivikylän Areena	Maija Koski
Sport	Vaasan Sport Naiset	Vaasa	Marko Haapala	Vaasan Sähkö Areena	Elina Ojala
Team Kuortane	Team Kuortane	Kuortane	Mira Kuisma	Kuortaneen jäähalli	Emilia Vesa
TPS	Turun Palloseura Naiset	Turku	Matti Tähkäpää	Marli Areena	Minni Lehtopelto
Teams promoted from the Naisten Mestis to the Lower Division
APV	Alavuden Peli-Veikot Naiset	Alavus	Noora Mäkiranta	Alavus Areena	Pirjetta Turunen
RoKi	Rovaniemen Kiekko Naiset	Rovaniemi	Tuomas Liitola	Lappi Areena	Ella Lahtela

== Regular season ==
=== Preliminaries ===
Series was played from 7 September to 24 November 2019. Top six teams advanced to the Upper Division (Finnish: Ylempi jatkosarja), while teams ranking sixth through tenth progressed to the Lower Division (Finnish: Alempi jatkosarja).

Pos	Team	Pld	W	OTW	OTL	L	GF	GA	GD	Pts	Final Result
1	Kiekko-Espoo	20	18	1	1	0	120	36	+84	57	Advance to Upper Division
2	KalPa	20	13	1	2	4	96	41	+55	43	Advance to Upper Division
3	HPK	20	13	0	3	4	85	67	+18	42	Advance to Upper Division
4	Team Kuortane	20	11	3	1	5	85	52	+33	40	Advance to Upper Division
5	Kärpät	20	11	3	0	6	54	35	+19	39	Advance to Upper Division
6	Ilves	20	8	2	2	8	56	54	+2	30	Advance to Upper Division
7	HIFK	20	6	2	3	9	65	61	+4	25	Advance to Lower Division
8	TPS	20	3	1	1	15	40	82	−42	12	Advance to Lower Division
9	Lukko	20	2	0	0	18	28	98	−70	6	Advance to Lower Division
10	Sport	20	2	0	0	18	35	139	−104	6	Advance to Lower Division

Updated to match(es) played on 30 November 2019. Source: Leijonat

=== Divisional series ===
Upper Division

Pos	Team	Pld	W	OTW	OTL	L	GF	GA	GD	Pts	Final Result
1	Kiekko-Espoo	30	20	3	2	5	145	60	+85	68	Advance to Quarterfinals
2	Kärpät	30	19	3	1	7	90	53	+37	64	Advance to Quarterfinals
3	KalPa	30	17	4	2	7	124	60	+64	61	Advance to Quarterfinals
4	HPK	30	18	1	4	7	109	71	+38	60	Advance to Quarterfinals
5	Team Kuortane	30	14	4	2	10	106	100	+6	52	Advance to Quarterfinals
6	Ilves	30	9	2	5	14	77	95	−18	36	Advance to Quarterfinals

Updated to match(es) played on 2 February 2020. Source: Leijonat

Lower Division

Pos	Team	Pld	W	OTW	OTL	L	GF	GA	GD	Pts	Final Result
1	HIFK	10	9	0	0	1	59	13	+46	27	Advance to Quarterfinals
2	Sport	10	5	2	1	2	38	30	+8	20	Advance to Quarterfinals
3	Lukko	10	3	2	1	4	29	30	−1	14	Proceed to Qualification series
4	RoKi	10	3	1	2	4	35	37	−2	13	Proceed to Qualification series
5	TPS	10	2	3	1	4	21	28	−7	13	Proceed to Qualification series
6	APV	10	0	0	3	7	11	55	−44	3	Proceed to Qualification series

Updated to match(es) played on 2 February 2020. Source: Leijonat

== Playoffs ==
The Naisten Liiga 2019–2020 Playoffs began 22 February 2020.

=== Bracket ===
Quarterfinals
1	Kiekko-Espoo	3
8	Sport	0
4	HPK	2
5	Team Kuortane	3
3	KalPa	3
6	Ilves	0
2	Kärpät	3
7	HIFK	0

Semifinals
1	Kiekko-Espoo	3
5	Team Kuortane	0
3	KalPa	3
2	Kärpät	2

Finals
SF1	Kiekko-Espoo	–
SF2	KalPa	–
Third place
SF3	Kärpät	–
SF4	Team Kuortane	–

=== Quarterfinals ===
K-Espoo – Sport 3-0
22.2.2020	K-Espoo	Sport	9-2 (ref)
23.2.2020	Sport	K-Espoo	1-11 (ref)
26.2.2020	K-Espoo	Sport	9-2 (ref)
Kiekko-Espoo won the series 3–0.

KalPa – Ilves 3-0
22.2.2020	KalPa	Ilves	2-0 (ref)
23.2.2020	Ilves	KalPa	2-5 (ref)
26.2.2020	KalPa	Ilves	3-0 (ref)
KalPa won the series 3–0.

HPK – Kuortane 2-3
22.2.2020	HPK	Kuortane	4-7 (ref)
23.2.2020	Kuortane	HPK	4-5 SO (ref)
26.2.2020	HPK	Kuortane	4-3 (ref)
29.2.2020	Kuortane	HPK	2-1 (ref)
1.3.2020	HPK	Kuortane	1-3 (ref)
Team Kuortane won the series 3–2.

Kärpät – HIFK 3-0
22.2.2020	Kärpät	HIFK	4-3 OT (ref)
23.2.2020	HIFK	Kärpät	1-3 (ref)
27.2.2020	Kärpät	HIFK	3-2 (ref)
Kärpät won the series 3–0.

=== Semifinals ===
K-Espoo – Kuortane 3–0
3.3.2020	K-Espoo	Kuortane	6-3 (ref)
5.3.2020	Kuortane	K-Espoo	1-4 (ref)
7.3.2020	K-Espoo	Kuortane	7-3 (ref)
Kiekko-Espoo won the series 3–0.

Kärpät – KalPa 2–3
3.3.2020	Kärpät	KalPa	3-4 (ref)
5.3.2020	KalPa	Kärpät	0-1 (ref)
7.3.2020	Kärpät	KalPa	2-3 (ref)
8.3.2020	KalPa	Kärpät	1-6 (ref)
11.3.2020	Kärpät	KalPa	1-4 (ref)
KalPa won the series 3–2.

== Statistics ==
=== Scoring leaders ===
Preliminary series

The following players led the league in points at the conclusion of the preliminary series on 24 November 2019.

Player	Team	GP	G	A	Pts
Elisa Holopainen	KalPa	20	26	22	48
Matilda Nilsson	KalPa	19	19	24	43
Viivi Vainikka	Team Kuortane	20	21	18	39
Emmi Rakkolainen	Kiekko-Espoo	20	10	26	36
Minttu Tuominen	Kiekko-Espoo	20	18	16	34
Annina Rajahuhta	Kiekko-Espoo	20	17	17	34
Kiira Yrjänen	Team Kuortane	20	18	14	32
Tanja Niskanen	KalPa	16	14	18	32
Riikka Noronen	HPK	20	16	19	31
Anniina Kaitala	HPK	20	11	18	29

Divisional series

The following players led the Upper Division in regular season points at the conclusion of the series on 2 February 2020.

Player	Team	GP	G	A	Pts
Saila Saari	Kärpät	10	6	10	16
Elisa Holopainen	KalPa	10	11	3	14
Tanja Niskanen	KalPa	10	9	5	14
Viivi Vainikka	Team Kuortane	10	7	6	13
Nelli Salomäki	Kärpät	10	4	9	13

The following players led the Lower Division in regular season points at the conclusion of the series on 2 February 2020.

Player	Team	GP	G	A	Pts
Emmanuelle Passard	HIFK	10	11	11	22
Karoliina Rantamäki	HIFK	9	8	11	19
Susanna Viitala	Sport	8	9	8	17
Noora Mylläri	Sport	10	9	8	17
Caroline Shaunessy	HIFK	10	3	14	17

=== Leading goaltenders ===
Preliminary series

The following goaltenders led the league in save percentage at the conclusion of the preliminary series on 24 November 2019, while starting at least one third of matches.

Player	Team	GP	TOI	W	L	GA	SO	SV%	GA60
Tiina Ranne	KalPa	12	721:41	10	2	24	2	.939	2.00
Anni Keisala	Ilves	15	828:13	5	5	30	3	.939	2.17
Johanna Oksman	Kärpät	10	605:51	5	3	18	2	.939	1.78
Susanna Airaksinen	Kärpät	10	599:39	5	3	14	4	.936	1.40
Isabella Portnoj	TPS	16	958:49	3	9	58	1	.929	3.63

Divisional series

The following goaltenders led the Upper Division in regular season save percentage at the conclusion of match(es) on 29 January 2020, while starting at least one third of matches.

Player	Team	GP	TOI	W	L	GA	SO	SV%	GA60
Salla Sivula	HPK	5	297.58	4	1	5	1	.970	1.01
Iina Kuusela	KalPa	3	177.12	2	1	5	0	.955	1.69
Tiina Ranne	KalPa	5	302:32	3	1	9	0	.951	1.78
Susanna Airaksinen	Kärpät	3	179:05	2	1	4	1	.949	1.34
Johanna Oksman	Kärpät	5	300:00	4	0	9	0	.940	1.80

The following goaltenders led the Lower Division in regular season save percentage at the conclusion the series on 2 February 2020, while starting at least one third of matches.

Player	Team	GP	TOI	W	L	GA	SO	SV%	GA60
Sanni Ahola	HIFK	4	240:00	3	0	4	1	.961	1.00
Johanna Niemi	Lukko	6	334:46	2	1	7	0	.957	1.25
Lumi Jääskeläinen	HIFK	5	278:37	3	1	4	3	.953	0.86
Riikka Oinonen	TPS	7	417:24	2	2	18	0	.929	2.59
Melisa Mörönen	Sport	8	489:26	3	1	20	3	.927	2.45

== Awards ==
=== Finnish Ice Hockey Association awards ===
- Riikka Nieminen Award (Best Player): Tanja Niskanen, KalPa
- Tuula Puputti Award (Best Goaltender): Johanna Oksman, Kärpät
- Päivi Halonen Award (Best Defenceman): Nelli Laitinen, Kiekko-Espoo
- Katja Riipi Award (Best Forward): Elisa Holopainen, KalPa
- Noora Räty Award (Best Rookie): Krista Parkkonen, HIFK
- Sari Fisk Award (Best Plus/Minus): Matilda Nilsson, KalPa
- Marianne Ihalainen Award (Regular season most points): Saila Saari, Kärpät
- Tiia Reima Award (Regular season most goals): Elisa Holopainen, KalPa
- Emma Laaksonen Award (Fair-Play Player): Viivi Vainikka, Team Kuortane
- Student Athlete Award: Tanja Koljonen, Ilves
- U18 Student Athlete Award: Nelli Laitinen, Kiekko-Espoo
- Hannu Saintula Award (Coach of the Year): Marjo Voutilainen, KalPa
- Karoliina Rantamäki Award (MVP of the Playoffs): not awarded
- Anu Hirvonen Award (Best Referee): Johanna Tauriainen
- Johanna Suban Award (Best Linesman): Johanna Oksanen

Source: Finnish Ice Hockey Association

=== 2019–20 Naisten Liiga All-Stars ===
All-Star Team

- Goaltender: Johanna Oksman, Kärpät
- Defenceman: Nelli Laitinen, Kiekko-Espoo
- Defenceman: Minttu Tuominen, Kiekko-Espoo
- Winger: Elisa Holopainen, KalPa
- Center: Tanja Niskanen, KalPa
- Winger: Matilda Nilsson, KalPa

All-Star Team II

- Goaltender: Tiina Ranne, KalPa
- Defenceman: Isa Rahunen, Kärpät
- Defenceman: Kreetta Kulhua, Ilves
- Winger: Kiira Yrjänen, Team Kuortane
- Center: Viivi Vainikka, Team Kuortane
- Winger: Ida Karjalainen, HPK

Source: Finnish Ice Hockey Association

=== Naisten Liiga Player of the Month ===
- September 2019: Matilda Nilsson, KalPa
- October 2019: Kiira Yrjänen, Team Kuortane
- November 2019: Emmi Rakkolainen, Kiekko-Espoo
- December 2019: Emmanuelle Passard, HIFK
- January 2020: Viivi Vainika, Team Kuortane

== Milestones ==
- On 20 October 2019, HPK forward and captain Riikka Noronen scored her 703rd career point, surpassing Linda Välimäki's record and taking sole possession of first on the all-time career points list
- On 24 November 2019, Lukko forward and captain Maija Koski played her 100th Naisten Liiga game
