= 2023–24 Naisten Liiga season =

41st ice hockey season of the Naisten Liiga

- League: Naisten Liiga
- Sport: Ice hockey
- Defending champions: IFK Helsinki (2022–23)
- Duration: 9 September 2023 – 18 February 2024; Playoffs; 23 February 2024 – 23 March 2024
- Games: 32
- Teams: 9
- TV partner: Leijonat.tv

Regular Season
- Season champions: Kiekko-Espoo
- Runners-up: IFK Helsinki
- Top scorer: Michaela Pejzlová, HIFK

Playoffs
- Playoffs MVP: Clara Rozier, HIFK
- Finals champions: IFK Helsinki
- Runners-up: Kiekko-Espoo

Naisten Liiga seasons
- ← 2022–23 2024–25 →

The 2023–24 Naisten Liiga season was the forty-first season of the Naisten Liiga, the premier level of women's ice hockey in Finland, since the league's establishment as the Naisten SM-sarja in 1982. The regular season began on 9 September 2023 and concluded on 18 February 2024. The playoffs began on 23 February 2024 and the Aurora Borealis Cup was awarded to IFK Helsinki (HIFK) on 21 March 2024.

Entering the season, HIFK were the reigning champions of both the 2022–23 regular season and the 2023 Aurora Borealis Cup.

== Off-season ==
=== Dissolution of Lukko ===
Lukko unexpectedly withdrew from the Naisten Liiga and the team was dissolved in April 2023, just weeks after they’d successfully defended their place in the league in the 2023 Naisten Liiga qualification. Rauman Lukko ry, the team's operating association, cited difficulties in recruiting and retaining players as the principal reasons behind the decision.

Lukko players were not consulted prior to the announcement. Captain Maija Koski was shocked by the news and felt that the team could have been saved if avenues of communication had been opened between the association and Lukko players.

Lukko's departure from the Naisten Liiga decreased the number of teams in the league from ten to nine for the 2023–24 season. The standard 36-game season was reduced to 32 games per team to account for the four game that would have been played against Lukko.

Five Lukko players – forwards Carolina Grönroos, Maija Koski, and Amanda Julkunen, and defensemen Hanna Brofelt and Mette Karru – transferred to TPS in Turku, about 90 km (56 mi) southeast of Rauma. Centre Aliisa Toivonen, Lukko's leading scorer in the 2022–23 season, signed with Kiekko-Espoo.

=== Coaching changes ===
Team	2022–23	2023–24	Details
Off–season
RoKi	Tuomas Liitola	Teemu Koivula	Liitola departed RoKi in June 2023 to accept the head coaching position with Skellefteå AIK in the Swedish Nationella Damhockeyligan (NDHL). He had served as RoKi's head coach for five seasons, during which the team earned promotion to the Naisten Liiga and consistently defended its place in the league. The vacancy left by Liitola was filled by 26 year old Koivula, a recent physical education graduate of the Lapland University of Applied Sciences. Koivula previously coached junior ice hockey teams of Rovaniemen Kiekko (RoKi), including RoKi U16 boys' team in the U16 SM-sarja during the 2022–23 season.
Team Kuortane	Mira Kuisma	Juuso Nieminen	After four seasons as head coach of both the Finnish national U18 team and Team Kuortane, Kuisma was appointed head coach of the national U18 team on a full-time basis. Nieminen joins Team Kuortane after several seasons coaching in the junior department of RoKi, most recently serving as head coach to the RoKi U18 team in the men's U18 Mestis during the 2021–22 season.

=== Player movements ===
Note: This section does not record all player signings. It is limited to player movements involving national team players (from any country), international import players, and extra-league signings. Player nationality is limited to the primary nation of IIHF eligibility; some players may hold citizenship in more than one country.

Player	Nat	Previous team	2023–24 team	ref.
Incoming players
Eline Gabriele (G)	(Netherlands)	IF Björklöven (NDHL)	HPK Hämeenlinna	
Alexandra Mateičková (D)	(Slovakia)	HC ŠKP Bratislava (EWHL)	RoKi Rovaniemi	
Beáta Narovcová (D)	(Czech Republic)	ŽHC Příbram (Extraliga)	TPS Turku	
Emma Nuutinen (F)	(Finland)	Buffalo Beauts (PHF)	Kiekko-Espoo	
Lunasa Sano (F)	(Japan)	DEC Salzburg Eagles (EWHL)	KalPa Kuopio	
Blanka Škodová (G)	(Czech Republic)	Minnesota Duluth Bulldogs (NCAA)	HIFK Helsinki	
Minttu Tuominen (D)	(Finland)	Metropolitan Riveters (PHF)	Kiekko-Espoo	
Anna Vaníčková (D)	(Czech Republic)	ŽHC Berounské Lvice (Extraliga)	HPK Hämeenlinna	
Intra-league transfers
Tilli Keränen (F)	(Finland)	Kärpät Oulu	KalPa Kuopio	
Olivia Last (G)	(Australia)	RoKi Rovaniemi	TPS Turku	
Tereza Pištěková (F)	(Czech Republic)	TPS Turku	HPK Hämeenlinna	
Pauliina Salonen (F)	(Finland)	TPS Turku	HIFK Helsinki	
Lucia Záborská (F)	(Slovakia)	HPK Hämeenlinna	TPS Turku	
Departing players
Lumi Jääskeläinen (G)	(Finland)	HIFK Helsinki	Skellefteå AIK (NDHL)	
Jenna Kaila (F)	(Finland)	KalPa Kuopio	HC Ambrì-Piotta Girls (SWHL A)	
Iina Kuusela (G)	(Finland)	HIFK Helsinki	retired	
Anni Montonen (F)	(Finland)	Kiekko-Espoo	HV71 (SDHL)	
Emmi Mourujärvi (D)	(Finland)	TPS Turku	Mercyhurst Lakers (NCAA)	
Sofia Nuutinen (F)	(Finland)	Kiekko-Espoo	Mercyhurst Lakers (NCAA)	
Emmi Rakkolainen (F)	(Finland)	Kiekko-Espoo	HV71 (SDHL)	
Noora Räty (G)	(Finland)	HPK Hämeenlinna	~~Metropolitan Riveters (PHF)~~	
Jenna Silvonen (G)	(Finland)	Kiekko-Espoo	retired	
Sofianna Sundelin (F)	(Finland)	Team Kuortane	St. Cloud State Huskies (NCAA)	
Nea Tervonen (F)	(Finland)	Team Kuortane	Syracuse Orange (NCAA)	
Emilia Vesa (F)	(Finland)	HIFK Helsinki	Frölunda HC (SDHL)	

== Teams ==
Location of teams in the Naisten Liiga

Team	Location	Home venue	Head coach	Captain
HIFK	Helsinki	Pirkkolan jäähalli	Saara Niemi	Karoliina Rantamäki
HPK	Hämeenlinna	Jääliikuntakeskus Hakio	Jari Risku	Heta Seikkula
Ilves	Tampere	Tesoman jäähalli	Marjo Voutilainen	Jenna Lehtiniemi
KalPa	Kuopio	Niiralan Monttu	Mika Väärälä	Johanna Juutilainen
Kiekko-Espoo	Espoo	Tapiolan harjoitusareena	Sami Haapanen	Reetta Valkjärvi
Kärpät	Oulu	Raksilan jäähalli	Satu Kiipeli; ~~Saija Tarkki (interim)~~ ~~Sanna Lankosaari~~	Aino Kaijankoski
RoKi	Rovaniemi	Lappi Areena	Teemu Koivula	Eveliina Ollila
Team Kuortane	Kuortane	Kuortaneen jäähalli	Juuso Nieminen	Jenniina Kuoppala
TPS	Turku	Kupittaan jäähalli	Terhi Mertanen	Pihla Hämeenniemi

== Preseason ==
The preseason began on 10 August 2023 and comprised exhibition games played between Naisten Liiga teams or between a Naisten Liiga team and a boys' junior team from the youth department of the same club or a local club. No exhibition matches were scheduled for Kärpät or RoKi.

=== Schedule ===
Exhibition games
Date	Home	Score	Visitor	OT	Attn	Notes	Recap
10 August	HPK	7–1	TPS		50		
11 August	HIFK	5–4	HIFK U15		38		
12 August	Ilves	3–0	K-Espoo		30	Shutout recorded by Salla Sivula	
15 August	HPK	6–4	HPK U15 Oranssit		40		
18 August	HIFK	2–6	HIFK U16 Ak		50		
19 August	Ilves	8–2	TPS		50	Hat-trick recorded by Elli Suoranta	
20 August	TPS	0–4	Ilves		40	Shutout recorded by Melisa Mörönen	
24 August	Kuortane	7–1	S-Kiekko U14 Sininen		30		
26 August	K-Espoo	5–1	TPS		50		
27 August	K-Espoo	6–3	HPK		80		
29 August	HPK	3–5	K-Espoo		30		
30 August	HIFK	1–7	HIFK U16 SM		77		
31 August	TPS	1–4	HPK		50		
31 August	Kuortane	1–6	S-Kiekko U15 Musta		30	Hat-trick recorded by Vili Klasila (4 goals)	
1 September	KalPa	2–6	KalPa U16 Sawo		30		
1 September	TPS	3–1	K-Espoo		50		
2 September	K-Espoo	1–6	HIFK		70		
3 September	KalPa	6–1	Warkis Sawo U15 Sininen		100		
6 September	Kuortane	5–1	JPK U15 Musta		40		
7 September	Kuortane	1–4	S-Kiekko U15 Musta		40		

== Regular season ==
The regular season began on Saturday, 9 September 2023. All eight games of the opening weekend were played at Matinkylän jäähalli in Espoo; Team Kuortane was the only team that did not participate in any opening weekend games.

=== Standings ===
Pos	Team	Pld	W	OTW	OTL	L	GF	GA	GD	Pts	Postseason
1	Kiekko-Espoo	32	24	2	3	3	168	66	+102	79	Playoffs
2	HIFK (Note: In August 2023, the disciplinary committee of the Finnish Ice Hockey Association identified that necessary international transfer documents for HIFK player Michaela Pejzlová had not been filed for the 2022–23 Naisten Liiga season, which had concluded months earlier. The committee placed the fault on the club, which was responsible for managing the transfer, rather than on the individual player or the team executives. The club was issued a fine and the team was penalized with a six-point deduction for the 2023–24 Naisten Liiga season – the equivalent of two regulation-time victories.)	32	27	0	0	5	175	49	+126	75	Playoffs
3	HPK	32	21	0	3	8	120	68	+52	66	Playoffs
4	KalPa	32	18	2	2	10	119	81	+38	60	Playoffs
5	Tampereen Ilves	32	14	5	1	12	102	94	+8	53	Playoffs
6	Team Kuortane	32	9	2	3	18	65	99	−34	34	Playoffs
7	Oulun Kärpät	32	7	2	2	21	69	133	−64	27	Playoffs
8	TPS	32	5	3	2	22	59	133	−74	23	Playoffs
9	RoKi	32	2	1	1	28	55	209	−154	9	Qualification

Source: Leijonat

=== Schedule ===
Regular Season

September 2023
Date	Home	Score	Visitor	OT	Attn	Notes	Recap
9 September	K-Espoo	2–6	HIFK		230		
9 September	Kärpät	4–2	TPS		90		
9 September	HPK	3–1	RoKi		70		
9 September	Ilves	1–0	KalPa		130	Shutout recorded by Salla Sivula (1)	
10 September	KalPa	1–3	HPK		100		
10 September	TPS	3–4	RoKi		50		
10 September	HIFK	5–3	Kärpät		80		
10 September	K-Espoo	2–3	Ilves	OT	130		
15 September	K-Espoo	6–0	TPS		72	Hat-trick by Lisette Täks (1); Shutout recorded by Minja Drufva (1)	
16 September	HPK	7–2	TPS		60		
16 September	RoKi	0–3	Ilves		80	Shutout recorded by Melissa Mörönen (1)	
16 September	KalPa	1–4	HIFK		99		
16 September	Kärpät	1–3	Kuortane		131		
17 September	RoKi	2–4	Ilves		79	Hat-trick by Anniina Kaitala (1)	
17 September	HIFK	3–1	HPK		193		
17 September	KalPa	3–0	Kuortane		70	Shutout recorded by Aino Laitinen (1)	
21 September	HPK	0–2	Ilves		110	Shutout recorded by Salla Sivula (2)	
23 September	RoKi	2–3	Kärpät		73		
23 September	TPS	0–9	HIFK		80	Hat-trick by Julia Liikala (1); Shutout recorded by Kiia Lahtinen (1); Seven assists recorded by Michaela Pejzlová	
23 September	Kuortane	0–3	KalPa		60	Shutout recorded by Aino Laitinen (2)	
23 September	K-Espoo	4–3	HPK		84		
24 September	TPS	1–0	Kuortane	OT	60	Shutout recorded by Olivia Last (1)	
24 September	KalPa	3–4	Ilves		91		
29 September	Ilves	1–3	HPK		70		
30 September	Kärpät	1–2	TPS		103		
30 September	Kuortane	0–4	K-Espoo		50	Shutout recorded by Tiia Pajarinen (1)	
30 September	RoKi	0–12	HIFK		69	Hat-trick by Julia Liikala (2); Hat-trick by Pauliina Salonen (1); Shutout recorded by Blanka Škodová (1)	
30 September	KalPa	3–4	Ilves	OT	126		

October 2023
Date	Home	Score	Visitor	OT	Attn	Notes	Recap
1 October	Kuortane	3–4	TPS	SO	60		
1 October	Kärpät	0–8	HIFK		102	Hat-trick by Michaela Pejzlová (1); Shutout recorded by Kiia Lahtinen (2)	
1 October	KalPa	4–7	K-Espoo		82	Hat-trick by Lisette Täks (2)	
6 October	TPS	1–8	HIFK		87		
7 October	HIFK	10–3	Ilves		108	Hat-trick by Clara Rozier (1)	
7 October	Kuortane	3–2	RoKi		60		
7 October	HPK	4–3	KalPa		70		
7 October	K-Espoo	8–1	Kärpät		74		
8 October	HPK	8–0	Kärpät		70	Shutout recorded by Janika Järvikari (1)	
8 October	TPS	1–4	KalPa		79		
8 October	Kuortane	7–3	RoKi		60	Hat-trick by Moona Keskisarja (1)	
13 October	Kuortane	2–3	Ilves		70		
14 October	Kärpät	0–7	HPK		101	Hat-trick by Kiti Seikkula (1); Shutout recorded by Janika Järvikari (2)	
14 October	KalPa	0–3	HIFK		105	Shutout recorded by Kiia Lahtinen (3)	
14 October	Kuortane	2–1	TPS		70		
14 October	RoKi	0–9	K-Espoo		70	Shutout recorded by Tiia Pajarinen (2)	
15 October	RoKi	3–7	HPK		70		
15 October	Kärpät	2–9	K-Espoo		113	Hat-trick by Lisette Täks (3)	
20 October	HPK	4–1	TPS		50		
21 October	HIFK	4–3	K-Espoo		204	Highest attendance match of the month	
21 October	Ilves	4–3	Kärpät	SO	105		
21 October	HPK	4–0	Kuortane		60	Shutout recorded by Janika Järvikari (3)	
21 October	KalPa	5–1	RoKi		55		
22 October	KalPa	2–3	RoKi	SO	75		
22 October	TPS	4–0	Kärpät		80	Shutout recorded by Olivia Last (2)	
22 October	K-Espoo	5–2	Ilves		91	Hat-trick by Emma Nuutinen (1)	
22 October	Kuortane	0–4	HIFK		60	Shutout recorded by Miia Vainio (1)	
28 October	KalPa	9–2	TPS		77	Hat-trick by Elisa Holopainen (1); Hat-trick by Sanni Rantala (1)	
28 October	HPK	3–4	K-Espoo	SO	70		
28 October	HIFK	6–2	Ilves		76		
28 October	Kuortane	3–6	Kärpät		60		
29 October	KalPa	3–0	TPS		74	Shutout recorded by Aino Laitinen (3)	
29 October	Kuortane	2–6	HPK		60		
29 October	Kärpät	5–2	RoKi		155		

November 2023
Date	Home	Score	Visitor	OT	Attn	Notes	Recap
3 November	TPS	4–5	Ilves	OT	110		
3 November	K-Espoo	3–0	HPK		68	Shutout recorded by Tiia Pajarinen (3)	
4 November	Ilves	0–11	HIFK		65	Hat-trick by Julia Liikala (3), four goals total; Hat-trick by Michaela Pejzlová (2), four goals total; Shutout recorded by Kiia Lahtinen (4)	
4 November	TPS	4–2	RoKi		90		
4 November	K-Espoo	4–5	Kuortane	SO	72		
4 November	Kärpät	1–7	KalPa		101		
5 November	HPK	7–2	RoKi		120	Hat-trick by Kiti Seikkula (2), four goals total	
5 November	HIFK	4–0	Kuortane		116	Shutout recorded by Miia Vainio (2)	
18 November	KalPa	4–3	K-Espoo	SO	108		
18 November	Kärpät	2–1	Ilves		100		
18 November	RoKi	3–4	TPS	OT	60	Hat-trick by Anna Kalová (1)	
19 November	RoKi	5–4	TPS		70	Hat-trick by Jemina Lepola (1)	
19 November	Kuortane	1–3	K-Espoo		50		
19 November	KalPa	3–1	HPK		71		
19 November	Kärpät	2–7	Ilves		109		
25 November	Kärpät	5–6	KalPa	OT	190	Highest attendance match of the month	
25 November	Ilves	3–1	TPS		55		
25 November	HIFK	3–0	Kuortane		88	Shutout recorded by Kiia Lahtinen (5)	
25 November	K-Espoo	11–1	RoKi		75	Hat-trick by Nea Katajamäki (1)	
26 November	KalPa	3–0	Kärpät		93	Shutout recorded by Tiina Ranne (1)	
26 November	HIFK	6–0	RoKi		77	Shutout recorded by Miia Vainio (3)	
26 November	K-Espoo	4–1	Kuortane		107		
26 November	TPS	0–3	HPK		70	Shutout recorded by Eline Gabriele (1)	
29 November	Ilves	1–3	K-Espoo		55		

December 2023
Date	Home	Score	Visitor	OT	Attn	Notes	Recap
2 December	TPS	2–0	Kuortane		80	Shutout recorded by Olivia Last (3)	
2 December	HPK	2–1	Ilves		180	Highest attendance match of the month	
2 December	HIFK	5–0	Kärpät		83	Hat-trick by Sanni Vanhanen (1); Shutout recorded by Miia Vainio (4)	
2 December	RoKi	0–7	KalPa		46	Shutout recorded by Tiina Ranne (2)	
3 December	RoKi	3–8	KalPa		44	Hat-trick by Elisa Holopainen (2), four goals total	
3 December	HPK	4–2	Kuortane		50		
3 December	K-Espoo	4–2	Kärpät		65		
3 December	HIFK	3–1	TPS		96		
8 December	HIFK	0–3	K-Espoo		82	Shutout recorded by Tiia Pajarinen (4); HIFK first loss of the season (last team to record a loss)	
9 December	Ilves	2–3	KalPa		75		
9 December	TPS	0–3	K-Espoo		110	Shutout recorded by Minja Drufva (2)	
9 December	Kuortane	2–3	HPK		50		
9 December	Kärpät	8–3	RoKi		145	Hat-trick by Emma Ekoluoma (1), four goals total	
10 December	Ilves	3–4	Kuortane		70		
10 December	KalPa	2–1	Kärpät		86		
10 December	HPK	5–4	HIFK		90	Hat-trick by Ella Välikangas (1)	
No games scheduled during Winter Recess, 11 December to 11 January

January 2024
Date	Home	Score	Visitor	OT	Attn	Notes	Recap
12 January	Ilves	4–2	HIFK		57		
13 January	RoKi	1–9	HPK		53		
13 January	TPS	0–4	K-Espoo		51	Shutout recorded by Tiia Pajarinen (5)	
13 January	HIFK	1–2	KalPa		74		
14 January	K-Espoo	6–4	KalPa		107	Hat-trick by Elisa Holopainen (3)	
14 January	Kärpät	3–2	HPK	OT	105		
14 January	TPS	2–3	Ilves	OT	60		
20 January	HPK	4–0	Kärpät		325	Shutout recorded by Kassidy Sauvé (1); Highest attendance match of the season	
20 January	Kuortane	4–5	HIFK		60		
20 January	K-Espoo	4–5	KalPa		108		
20 January	Ilves	9–2	RoKi		61		
21 January	Ilves	10–1	RoKi		64		
21 January	HPK	2–3	K-Espoo	OT	70		
21 January	TPS	5–3	Kärpät		51		
21 January	HIFK	5–2	KalPa		82		
24 January	HIFK	4–1	HPK		85		
27 January	Kärpät	2–5	K-Espoo		101		
27 January	RoKi	0–12	HIFK		53	Hat-trick by Karoliina Rantamäki (1); Shutout recorded by Miia Vainio (5); Five assists recorded Michaela Pejzlová	
27 January	TPS	3–5	KalPa		60	Hat-trick by Elisa Holopainen (4)	
27 January	Kuortane	1–2	Ilves		80		
28 January	RoKi	2–13	K-Espoo		54	Hat-trick by Lisette Täks (4), four goals total Five assists recorded by Tinja-Mariia Haukijärvi	
28 January	Ilves	1–2	Kuortane	OT	70		
28 January	HPK	3–5	KalPa		74		
28 January	Kärpät	1–3	HIFK		105		

February 2024
Date	Home	Score	Visitor	OT	Attn	Notes	Recap
3 February	Ilves	3–5	K-Espoo		210		
3 February	TPS	0–4	HPK		70	Shutout recorded by Janika Järvikarvi (4)	
3 February	HIFK	7–1	RoKi		72		
3 February	Kuortane	0–1	Kärpät	SO	60	Shutout recorded by Emilia Piekkari (1)	
4 February	Ilves	4–3	Kärpät		65		
4 February	Kuortane	3–2	KalPa		70		
4 February	HIFK	12–1	TPS		79	Hat-trick by Clara Rozier (2), five goals and ten points total	
4 February	K-Espoo	12–1	RoKi		78	Hat-trick by Emma Nuutinen (2), four goals total	
10 February	Kärpät	2–4	Kuortane		235	Highest attendance match of the month	
11 February	RoKi	1–3	Kuortane		49		
16 February	Ilves	4–1	TPS		42		
17 February	RoKi	1–4	Kärpät		54		
17 February	KalPa	7–3	Kuortane		147	Hat-trick by Elisa Holopainen (5); Hat-trick by Tilli Keränen (1)	
17 February	Ilves	3–4	HPK		68		
17 February	K-Espoo	5–1	HIFK		236	Highest attendance match of the month	
18 February	HPK	3–5	HIFK		110	Hat-trick by Julia Liikala (4)	
18 February	K-Espoo	7–3	TPS		85	Hat-trick by Eevi Ilvonen (1)	
18 February	RoKi	3–5	Kuortane		43		

=== Player statistics ===
Note: Italics indicate player departed the Naisten Liiga in the midst of the 2023–24 season. See player movements for details.

==== Scoring leaders ====
The following players led the league in points at the conclusion of regular season on 18 February 2024.

Player	Team	GP	G	A	Pts	PIM
Michaela Pejzlová	HIFK	24	30	41	71	4
Sanni Vanhanen	HIFK	32	27	39	66	12
Emma Nuutinen	K-Espoo	31	28	35	63	24
Julia Liikala	HIFK	26	24	36	60	14
Clara Rozier	HIFK	32	29	29	58	24
Elisa Holopainen	KalPa	19	32	25	57	6
Lisette Täks	K-Espoo	32	39	15	54	34
Julia Schalin	K-Espoo	31	11	37	48	8
Johanna Juutilainen	KalPa	32	20	26	46	2
Kiti Seikkula	HPK	31	22	23	45	8
Nea Katajamäki	K-Espoo	31	15	27	42	18
Júlia Matejková	HPK	29	16	22	38	14
Tereza Pištěková	HPK	32	11	24	35	12
Anniina Kaitala	Ilves	27	21	13	34	12
Pauliina Salonen	HIFK	30	20	14	34	22
Sanni Rantala	KalPa	30	13	21	34	4
Emilia Varpula	Ilves	31	6	27	33	6
Siiri Yrjölä	HIFK	27	5	28	33	6
Helen Puputti	Ilves	31	13	19	32	12
Aliisa Toivonen	K-Espoo	32	9	23	32	18
Minttu Tuominen	K-Espoo	18	5	26	31	4
Tilli Keränen	KalPa	28	14	16	30	8
Elli Suoranta	Ilves	27	13	15	28	18
Julia Zielińska	K-Espoo	29	12	16	28	32
Emma Ekoluoma	Kärpät	31	16	11	27	10
Anna Kalová	RoKi	30	15	12	27	24
Susanna Viitala	TPS	30	14	13	27	8
Reetta Valkjärvi	K-Espoo	28	7	20	27	8
Noora Mylläri	Ilves	29	13	13	26	18
Ines Lukkarila	HPK	26	12	14	26	10

The following skaters were the top point scorers of teams not represented in the scoring leader table at the conclusion of the season on 18 February 2024, noted with their overall league scoring rank:

51. Raili Mustonen, Kuortane: 30 GP, 7 G, 8 A, 15 Pts, 14 PIM

==== Goaltenders ====
The following goaltenders played at least one-third of their team's minutes in net at the conclusion of the regular season on 18 February 2024, sorted by save percentage.

Player	Team	GP	TOI	W	L	S	GA	SO	S%	GAA
Kiia Lahtinen	HIFK	16	953:13	12	4	320	23	5	93.3	1.45
Janika Järvikari	HPK	11	633:15	8	1	202	15	4	93.1	1.42
Melisa Mörönen	Ilves	13	731:58	8	3	259	24	1	91.5	1.97
Minja Drufva	K-Espoo	17	987:55	15	0	326	31	2	91.3	1.88
Eline Gabriele	HPK	16	925:48	12	4	313	30	1	91.3	1.94
Tiia Pajarinen	K-Espoo	16	950:45	10	4	343	33	5	91.2	2.08
Kerttu Kuja-Halkola	Kuortane	13	786:58	3	8	352	34	1	91.2	2.59
Olivia Last	TPS	22	1237:38	7	13	661	64	3	91.2	3.10
Miia Vainio	HIFK	11	657:30	10	1	172	17	5	91.0	1.55
Tiina Ranne	KalPa	21	1234:38	11	9	477	52	2	90.2	2.53
Salla Sivula	Ilves	18	1027:07	10	8	496	55	2	90.0	3.21
Emilia Piekkari	Kärpät	20	1135:54	3	13	668	83	1	88.9	4.38
Kati Asikainen	Kärpät	14	791:07	5	9	376	48	0	88.7	3.64
Lilia Huovinen	Kuortane	12	712:26	5	6	287	37	0	88.6	3.12
Annika Saastamoinen	RoKi	14	756:52	1	11	481	75	0	86.5	5.95
Alexandra Väyrynen	RoKi	20	1050:55	1	16	693	116	0	85.7	6.62

Backup goaltenders

The following goaltenders had played a minimum of one game but fewer than one-third of their team's minutes in net at the conclusion of games played 18 February 2024, sorted by save percentage.

Player	Team	GP	TOI	W	L	S	GA	SO	S%	GAA
Blanka Škodová	HIFK	5	300:00	5	0	87	7	1	92.6	1.40
Aino Laitinen	KalPa	8	443:08	5	2	186	18	3	91.2	2.44
Emilia Kyrkkö	Kuortane	6	302:25	2	3	140	14	0	90.9	2.78
Jenna Juutilainen	KalPa	4	245:00	3	0	71	8	0	89.9	1.96
Kassidy Sauvé	HPK	6	362:48	1	5	146	20	1	88.0	3.31
Suvi Saarinen	TPS	9	522:22	0	9	290	43	0	87.1	4.94
Venla Varis	Kuortane	2	121:57	0	2	39	7	0	84.8	3.44
Neea Pohjamo	Ilves	3	166:20	0	2	70	13	0	84.3	4.69
Iina Kankaanpää	RoKi	2	114:57	0	2	73	16	0	82.0	8.35
Tea Koljonen	K-Espoo/ TPS	4	146:28	0	2	78	18	0	81.3	7.37

=== Coaching changes ===
Team	Previous coach	New coach	Details
Mid–season
Kärpät	Sanna Lankosaari	Saija Tarkki (interim)	On 13 October 2023, Kärpät announced that Sanna Lankosaari had stepped down from the head coaching position. Following Lankosaari's departure, Kärpät youth hockey supervisor and former Kärpät Naiset general manager Saija Tarkki took over as interim head coach during the search for a replacement. Lankosaari initiated the termination of her contract after Kärpät amassed only six points in the first eight games of the season and ranked eighth in the league, ahead of only RoKi.
Kärpät	Saija Tarkki (interim)	Satu Kiipeli	Kiipeli was revealed as the new head coach of Kärpät on 31 October 2023, less than three weeks after Lankosaari's resignation. She had served as an assistant coach on Lankosaari's coaching team since the 2022–23 season and was previously the head coach of Kärpät Akatemia in the Naisten Mestis and Naisten Suomi-sarja during 2016 to 2019. A former member of the Finnish national team, she participated in the 2006 Winter Olympics and in two IIHF World Championships. Her playing career was highlighted by three NCAA Championship titles with the Minnesota Duluth Bulldogs and both an Aurora Borealis Cup victory and an IIHF European Women's Champions Cup bronze medal with Kärpät.

=== In-season player movements ===
Note: This section records all in-season player transactions. Player nationality indicates primary nation of IIHF eligibility; some players may hold multiple citizenship.

Player	Nat	Previous team	Joining team	Movement date	ref.
Incoming players
Iveta Klimášová (F)	(Slovakia)	Buffalo Beauts (PHF)	HPK Hämeenlinna	29 September 2023	
Anna Kilponen (F)	(Finland)	ZSC Lions Frauen (SWHL A)	Ilves Tampere	23 November 2023	
Kassidy Sauvé (G)	(Canada)	Buffalo Beauts (PHF)	HPK Hämeenlinna	29 December 2023	
Minttu Tuominen (F/D)	(Finland)	Shenzhen KRS (WCIHL)	Kiekko-Espoo	1 February 2024	
Intra-league transfers
Laura Kivelä (F)	(Finland)	Team Kuortane	Kärpät	29 September 2023	
Tea Koljonen (G)	(Finland)	TPS	Kiekko-Espoo	12 December 2023	
Departing players
Blanka Škodová (G)	(Czech Republic)	HIFK Helsinki	AIK (SDHL)	13 October 2023	
Minttu Tuominen (F/D)	(Finland)	Kiekko-Espoo	Shenzhen KRS (WCIHL)	4 November 2023	
Karolína Erbanová (F)	(Czech Republic)	HPK Hämeenlinna	unknown	17 December 2023	
Iveta Klimášová (F)	(Slovakia)	HPK Hämeenlinna	AIK (SDHL)	17 December 2023	

==== Loans ====
Player	Nat	Signed team	Loaned team	Details
Riia Saarni (D)	(Finland)	Kiekko-Espoo	TPS Turku	2-game loan, 28–29 October 2023
Nella Berg (D)	(Finland)	VG-62 (U18 Mestis)	HPK Hämeenlinna	2-game loan, 20–21 January 2024

== Playoffs ==
As of 21 March 2024

Quarterfinals
1	Kiekko-Espoo	7	8	5	–	3
8	TPS Turku	0	1	2	–	0
4	KalPa Kuopio	2	2	2	2	3
5	Ilves Tampere	1	3	0	1	1
2	IFK Helsinki	7	3	4	–	3
7	Kärpät Oulu	2	1	2	–	0
3	HPK Hämeenlinna	2	3	5	–	3
6	Team Kuortane	1	0	1	–	0

Semifinals
Kiekko-Espoo	5	4	2	–	3
KalPa Kuopio	3	0	1	–	0
IFK Helsinki	0	5	5	4	3
HPK Hämeenlinna	1	4	0	1	1

Finals
2nd place, silver medalist(s)	Kiekko-Espoo	3	0	2	2	1
1st place, gold medalist(s)	IFK Helsinki	0	2	4	3	3
Bronze medal game
3rd place, bronze medalist(s)	KalPa Kuopio	3
4	HPK Hämeenlinna	1

== Awards and honors ==
- Kultainen Kypärä ('Golden Helmet'): Elisa Holopainen, KalPa

=== Finnish Ice Hockey Association awards ===
- Riikka Nieminen Award (Player of the Year): Elisa Holopainen, KalPa
- Tuula Puputti Award (Goaltender of the Year): Olivia Last, TPS
- Päivi Halonen Award (Defender of the Year): Siiri Yrjölä, HIFK
- Katja Riipi Award (Forward of the Year): Elisa Holopainen, KalPa
- Marianne Ihalainen Award (Top point scorer): Michaela Pejzlová, HIFK
- Tiia Reima Award (Top goal scorer): Lisette Täks, Kiekko-Espoo
- Sari Fisk Award (Best plus–minus): Clara Rozier, HIFK
- Noora Räty Award (Rookie of the Year): Kerttu Kuja-Halkola, Team Kuortane
- Emma Laaksonen Award (Fair-play player): Johanna Juutilainen, KalPa
- Karoliina Rantamäki Award (Playoff MVP): Clara Rozier, HIFK
- Hannu Saintula Award (Coach of the Year): Jari Risku, HPK
- Student Athlete Award: Ella Välikangas, HPK
- U18 Student Athlete Award: Amanda Julkunen, TPS
- Anu Hirvonen Award (Best Referee): Tiini Saarimäki
- Johanna Suban Award (Best Linesman): Salla Raitala

=== All-Star teams ===
All-Star teams were selected by Naisten Liiga coaches at the conclusion of the regular season.

All-Star Team

- Goaltender: Olivia Last, TPS
- Defenceman: Siiri Yrjölä, HIFK
- Defenceman: Sanni Rantala, KalPa
- Left Wing: Elisa Holopainen, KalPa
- Center: Michaela Pejzlová, HIFK
- Right Wing: Emma Nuutinen, Kiekko-Espoo

All-Star Team II

- Goaltender: Kerttu Kuja-Halkola, Team Kuortane
- Defenceman: Minttu Tuominen, Kiekko-Espoo
- Defenceman: Oona Koukkula, HPK
- Left Wing: Emma Ekoluoma, Kärpät
- Center: Lisette Täks, Kiekko-Espoo
- Right Wing: Julia Liikala, HIFK

=== Player of the Month ===
- September 2023: Salla Sivula (G), Ilves
  Sivula dominated the goaltending table in the first month of the season, leading the league with a save percentage of 95.2 across five games in net. She faced 157 shots against while recording a win for every start, including shutouts against KalPa and HPK. The representative council of Naisten Liiga clubs highlighted that "Sivula has made top saves in every match she has played and [has] given her team a chance to win."
- October 2023: Lisette Täks (F), Kiekko-Espoo
  Täks earned a point in every Kiekko-Espoo game during October, extending her scoring streak to ten games and recording two hat-tricks (against KalPa and Kärpät). She finished the month with 12 goals and 5 assists for 18 points in seven games. In summation, the representative council of Naisten Liiga clubs noted that "her puck skills are very strong, she is a hard skater, and a good competitor."
- November 2023: Elisa Holopainen (F), KalPa
  Holopainen sustained a leg injury in late-January 2023 and rehabilitation kept her from competition for ten months. She made her return to the Naisten Liiga on 28 October and scored a hat-trick in her season debut. KalPa extended their win streak, which began with Holopainen's return, and claimed victories in all five matches during the month of November. In that period, Holopainen scored eight goals and tallied six assists for fourteen points – a rate of 2.8 points per game. Highlights included scoring the game-winning goal in overtime against Kärpät and the shootout winning goal against Kiekko-Espoo. The representative council of Naisten Liiga clubs observed that "the impact of one player on the whole team has been incredible."
- December 2023: Emma Ekoluoma (F), Kärpät
  Seventeen year old Ekoluoma recorded five goals and eight points across four games in December, including a four-goal showing in the Kärpät match versus RoKi. Regarding Ekoluoma's selection as player of the month, the representative council of Naisten Liiga clubs described her as "a young player who has become one of the most important player and scorers of Kärpät this season."
- January 2024: Michaela Pejzlová (F), HIFK
  Czech centre Pejzlová "dominated on the ice" following her return from an injury that had kept her sidelined through November and December. Across five matches in January, she recorded four goals and nine assists for thirteen points. Her return snapped HIFK's losing streak and she led the team to victory in every game match in which she played in January. The representative council of Naisten Liiga clubs were effusive in its praise, calling her the "most superior individual in the league at creating opportunities in the offensive end for herself and her teammates."
- February 2024: Emma Nuutinen (F), Kiekko-Espoo
