= Ella Viitasuo =

Finnish ice hockey player

- Born: 27 May 1996 (age 30) Lahti, Finland
- Height: 1.72 m (5 ft 8 in)
- Weight: 67 kg (148 lb; 10 st 8 lb)
- Position: Defense
- Shoots: Left
- Played for: HV71; Kiekko-Espoo; Espoo Blues; Espoo United; JYP Jyväskylä; Team Kuortane
- National team: Finland
- Playing career: 2012–present
Medal record
Olympic Games
Bronze medal – third place	2018 Pyeongchang	Ice hockey
Bronze medal – third place	2022 Beijing	Ice hockey
World Championship
Silver medal – second place	2019 Finland
Bronze medal – third place	2021 Canada

Ella Viitasuo (born 27 May 1996) is a Finnish ice hockey player and member of the Finnish national team. She most recently played during the 2022–23 season with HV71 of the Swedish Women's Hockey League (SDHL).

Viitasuo represented Finland with the national under-18 ice hockey team at the IIHF World Women's U18 Championship in 2012, 2013, and 2014; Finland placed fifth in all three tournaments. Her first match with the women's national team came in August 2014, and her world championship debut was made at the 2016 IIHF Women's World Championship. She played in the women's ice hockey tournament at the 2018 Olympic Winter Games, in which Finland claimed bronze, and at the 2019 IIHF Women's World Championship, in which Finland won their first-ever silver medal.

== Playing career ==
Viitasuo developed in the minor system of the Pelicans 2000, an ice hockey club with a loose affiliation to the Liiga's Lahti Pelicans, in Hollola, a neighboring municipality to her hometown of Lahti. She first appeared with the club's representative women's team, Pellicans 2000 Naiset, in the 2009–10 season of the third-tier Naisten Suomi-sarja, playing in three qualification games at age thirteen. While primarily appearing with the Pelicans 2000 minor teams for her age group over the subsequent two seasons, she sporadically played with Pellicans 2000 Naiset, notching her first senior league assist in 2010–11 and her first goal in 2011–12.

For the 2012–13 season, she chose to sign with Team Oriflame Kuortane, which was created in 2010 by the Finnish Ice Hockey Association to serve as the national women's under-18 development team and also serves as the representative Naisten SM-sarja team of the Kuortaneen urheilulukio ('Kuortane Sports Academy'). Over her three seasons with Kuortane, Viitasuo established herself as a stay-at-home defenceman, amassing a relatively low four goals and ten assists for 14 points across 83 regular season games, with 62 penalty minutes – 40 of which were earned in her rookie season (2012–13) alone. However, Viitasuo was able to create a sizable increase in offensive production when it was most critical, posting 9 points (4 goals+5 assists) and just two penalty minutes in 16 relegation series games.

After completing her studies in Kuortane, Viitasuo joined the roster of JYP Jyväskylä Naiset, which featured many Finnish national team players, including Meeri Räisänen, Riikka Sallinen, Marjo Voutilainen, among others, and was captained by one of the best active defencemen in the world, Jenni Hiirikoski. The team was a powerhouse, winning 27 of 28 games in regulation, plus one game in overtime, to sweep the regular season. They kept up the momentum in the playoffs, steamrolling through the quarterfinal and semifinal rounds before sweeping HPK Kiekkonaiset in the best-of-five finals to claim the 2016 Finnish Championship title. Defense-focused Viitasuo tallied 8 points (5+4) in the 28-game regular season and registered one assist in six playoff games.

In the summer following the Aurora Borealis Cup victory, the operating association of JYP Naiset, Hockey Cats ry, declared bankruptcy, and the team was financially relegated from the Naisten SM-sarja. Like most JYP players, Viitasuo transferred to a different team in the Naisten SM-sarja, signing with the newly renamed Espoo United Naiset (previously and later known as Espoo Blues Naiset and Kiekko-Espoo Naiset). She succeeded in her first season with the team, scoring a career-high eight goals in 28 games. The following season, she earned a place on the Olympic national team, and her point production declined, notching 8 points (2+6), as she focused on preparing for the 2018 PyeongChang Winter Games. Despite decreased point totals, Viitasuo's overall game earned her a place on the 2018 Naisten Liiga All-Star Second Team. She was the recipient of the 2018 Scholastic Player of the Year award.

With a bronze medal now on her resume, Viitasuo brought her offensive game to the next level in the 2018–19 season, potting six goals and 13 assists in 30 games for 19 points in the regular season and tallying 3 points (2+1) in five playoff games. In the 2019–20 season, she broke the career-high points total set in the previous season, notching 24 points (6+18) in 30 games. She averaged a point per game in the playoffs, and her contributions helped the Espoo Blues Naiset clinch the 2019 Finnish Championship title.

== See also ==
- List of Olympic women's ice hockey players for Finland
