= Mika Väärälä =

Finnish ice hockey coach

- Born: 22 January 1988 (age 38) Keminmaa, Finland
- Position: Forward
- Shot: Right
- Current DFEL coach: HK Budapest
- Coached for: JYP Jyväskylä; Austria U18; EHV Sabres; Kapfenberger SV; KMH Budapest; KalPa Kuopio
- Playing career: 2007–2010
- Coaching career: 2010–present

Mika Väärälä (born 22 January 1988) is a Finnish ice hockey coach. He has served as assistant coach to Hokiklub Budapest in the German Women's Ice Hockey League (DFEL) since 2024. Väärälä was previously head coach of KalPa Naiset in the Naisten Liiga (NSML) during the 2022–23 and 2023–24 seasons.

== Coaching career ==
Väärälä started coaching at age 22, as head coach of JYP Naiset in the Naisten SM-sarja (renamed Naisten Liiga in 2017) during 2010 to 2013. Moving to Austria in 2013, he helmed the Austrian national under-18 team for two seasons, achieving promotion to Division I in the 2014 IIHF Women's U18 World Championship. In 2014, he took the head coaching position with the EHV Sabres and won the 2015 Championship of the Elite Women's Hockey League (EWHL; renamed European Women's Hockey League in 2019).

Relocating from Austria to Hungary in 2016, he joined the Hungarian national team as an assistant coach and began his first term as head coach of KMH Budapest in the EWHL.

During the 2018–19 season, Väärälä made his first foray into coaching men as head coach of the representative ice hockey team of Kapfenberger SV (KSV) in the Österreichische Amateur Hockey Liga (ÖAEL) and won the 2019 ÖAEL Championship.

He returned as head coach of KMH Budapest in 2019. Over the following three seasons, the team won the EWHL Championship three times and the EWHL Super Cup twice.

== Personal life ==
His wife, Esther Väärälä (née Kantor), holds the record for most games played with the Austrian women's national ice hockey team.
