= Sanni Hakala =

Finnish ice hockey player (born 1997)

- Born: 31 October 1997 (age 28) Jyväskylä, Finland
- Height: 1.54 m (5 ft 1 in)
- Weight: 55 kg (121 lb; 8 st 9 lb)
- Position: Winger
- Shot: Left
- Played for: JYP Jyväskylä; Oulun Kärpät; HV71
- National team: Finland
- Playing career: 2012–2023
Medal record
Olympic Games
Bronze medal – third place	2018 Pyeongchang	Ice hockey
Bronze medal – third place	2022 Beijing	Ice hockey
World Championships
Silver medal – second place	2019 Finland
Bronze medal – third place	2017 United States
Bronze medal – third place	2021 Canada

Sanni Hakala (born 31 October 1997) is a Finnish retired ice hockey player and former member of the Finnish national team.

She played more than seven seasons with HV71 in the Swedish Women's Hockey League (SDHL) after beginning her career in the Finnish Naisten SM-sarja (renamed Naisten Liiga in 2017) with JYP Jyväskylä and Oulun Kärpät.

In 2023, Hakala suffered a serious injury during a SDHL match that left her paralyzed from the chest down, ending her career at the age of 26.

== Playing career ==
As a youth player, Hakala played on boys' teams until she was 15, at which point she signed with JYP Jyväskylä in the Naisten SM-sarja, the top flight of Finnish women's hockey. She won the Emma Laaksonen Award for Fair Play in the 2015–16 season.

In November 2016, she left Finland to sign with HV71 in the SDHL. She was named HV71's fan player of the year for the 2019–20 season.

After missing the first third of the 2020–21 SDHL season, she scored a hat-trick in her first game back, a 6–1 victory over Brynäs IF in November 2020.

Hakala sustained severe neck injuries in a headfirst collision with a goal post during an HV71 match versus Djurgården IF on 24 November 2023. She was "conscious, talking and in pain" when medical personnel stretchered her from the ice. After being rushed to Ryhov County Hospital by ambulance, it was reported that she was able to move her arms but "didn't seem to have any feeling in her legs." The following day, she underwent surgery at Linköping University Hospital and the surgeons shared that the operation went well but emphasized that Hakala would have a long period of rehabilitation ahead. In a press release on 26 November 2023, HV71 made clear that further information about Hakala's condition would not be provided and asked that the public respect her need for peace and quiet during rehabilitation. On 30 November 2023, Hakala announced that she had been paralyzed, ending her career.

=== International play ===
She made her senior national team debut at the 2016 IIHF Women's World Championship. She has represented the Finnish national team at the World Championships every year since including the team's first-ever silver medal at the 2019 IIHF Women's World Championship. She scored one goal in six games as Finland won bronze at the 2018 Winter Olympics.

== Personal life ==
Hakala is married to Canadian ice hockey player and former HV71 teammate Danielle Stone.

== Career statistics ==
			Regular Season					Playoffs
Season	Team	League	GP	G	A	Pts	PIM	GP	G	A	Pts	PIM
2012-13	JYP	NSMs	12	7	2	9	2	8	0	0	0	6
2013-14	JYP	NSMs	25	11	13	24	22	8	6	3	9	6
2014-15	JYP	NSMs	25	20	21	41	24	3	0	0	0	0
2015-16	JYP	NSMs	23	17	19	36	4	6	0	1	1	2
2016-17	Kärpät	NSMs	13	7	2	9	10	–	–	–	–	–
2016-17	HV71	SDHL	18	4	3	7	0	6	1	1	2	4
2017-18	HV71	SDHL	35	15	21	36	12	2	0	2	2	0
2018-19	HV71	SDHL	35	22	20	42	10	7	2	1	3	6
2019-20	HV71	SDHL	34	20	18	38	6	6	6	6	12	2
2020-21	HV71	SDHL	23	8	10	18	2	5	1	1	2	0
2021-22	HV71	SDHL	35	12	11	23	8	3	0	0	0	0
2022-23	HV71	SDHL	30	11	6	17	10	2	2	0	2	2
2023-24	HV71	SDHL	16	6	7	13	6	–	–	–	–	—
Naisten SM-sarja totals			98	62	57	119	62	25	6	4	10	14
SDHL totals			226	98	96	194	54	31	12	11	23	14

=== International ===
Year	Team	Event	Result	GP	G	A	Pts	PIM
2013	Finland U18	WW18	5th	5	3	2	5	0
2014	Finland U18	WW18	5th	5	1	0	1	6
2015	Finland U18	WW18	5th	5	5	0	5	4
2016	Finland	WW	4th	4	0	0	0	4
2017	Finland	WW	3rd place, bronze medalist(s)	6	1	0	1	6
2018	Finland	OG	3rd place, bronze medalist(s)	6	1	0	1	0
2019	Finland	WW	2nd place, silver medalist(s)	4	1	2	3	0
2021	Finland	WW	3rd place, bronze medalist(s)	7	0	0	0	0
2022	Finland	OG	3rd place, bronze medalist(s)	7	1	0	1	4
Junior totals				15	9	2	11	10
Senior totals				34	4	2	6	14

== See also ==
- List of Olympic women's ice hockey players for Finland
