= JYP Naiset =

Naisten Mestis ice hockey team in Jyväskylä, Central Finland

- City: Jyväskylä, Central Finland, Finland
- League: Naisten Mestis
- Founded: 1989 as JyP HT; 1996 as JyHC
- Home arena: Jyväskylän harjoitusjäähalli
- Colours: Red, black, white
- Owner: JYP Juniorit ry
- Head coach: Sheila Gagnon
- Website: Official website

Franchise history
- First
- 1989–1997: JyP HC Naiset
- 1997–2000: JYP Naiset
- Second
- 1996–2004: Jyväskylän Hockey Cats
- 2004–2009: Cats Jyväskylä
- 2009–2016: JYP Naiset
- Current
- 2016–: JYP Naiset

Championships
- Finnish Championship: 3 (1996–97, 1997–98, 2015–16)

Current uniform
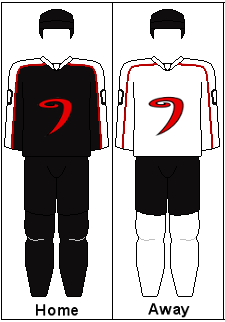

JYP Naiset or JYP Jyväskylä Naiset is a Finnish ice hockey team in the Naisten Mestis. Their home is the Jyväskylän harjoitusjäähalli ('Jyväskylä training ice hall') in Jyväskylä, Central Finland. JYP Naiset have won the Aurora Borealis Cup three times, in 1997, 1998, and 2016.

The team is the successor of two teams: JyP Hockey Team (HT) Naiset, which existed from 1989 to 2000 and used the name JYP Naiset during the period 1997 to 2000, and Jyväskylän Hockey Cats (JyHC), which was founded in 1996 and was known as the Cats Jyväskylä during 2004 to 2009 and JYP Naiset from 2009 to present. They are the women's representative team of the ice hockey club JYP Juniorit ry and are loosely affiliated with JYP Jyväskylä of the Liiga.

== History ==
=== JyP HT/JYP ===
The first JYP Naiset franchise was founded in 1989 as JyP HT Naiset by the ice hockey club JYP Jyväskylä Oy. The team competed in the Naisten I-divisioona during 1989 to 1995 and in the Naisten SM-sarja (renamed Naisten Liiga in 2017) during 1995 to 2000.

JyP HT Naiset won the Finnish Championship in 1997 and, after changing their name to JYP Naiset for the 1997–98 season, claimed the championship title again in 1998. In both championship seasons, the team was led by top point scorers Tiina Paananen, Riikka Sallinen (née Nieminen, previously Villilä), Rose Matilainen, and Kirsi Hänninen, and backstopped by the goaltending of Tuula Puputti. They followed the back-to-back championship victories with a silver medal finish in 1999 and in fourth place in 2000. After the conclusion of the 1999–2000 season, the team was merged with the Jyväskylän Hockey Cats (JyHC) and a number of its players continued to play with JyHC.

Other notable players from the JyP HC Naiset/JYP Naiset era include Pirjo Ahonen, Katja Lehto, Riikka Noronen, Sanna Peura, and Hanne Sikiö, among others.

=== Hockey Cats ===
Jyväskylän Hockey Cats (JyHC) was a women's ice hockey club, which was spun off from the JYP Jyväskylä in 1996 and run by the independent association Hockey Cats ry. The club operated several junior women's teams in addition to the representative women's team, which played in the Naisten II-divisioona and Naisten I-divisioona until it making its Naisten SM-sarja debut in the 1999–2000 Postseason qualification/relegation series (Finnish: Karsintasarja; also called the qualifiers). The 1999–2000 Naisten SM-sarja season was the only instance in which both the original JYP Naiset franchise and JyHC played in the same league, though they played in separate postseason divisions – JYP in the playoffs and JyHC in the qualifiers – and never faced one another. After the season concluded, JYP Naiset was merged with the Jyväskylän Hockey Cats and the unified team took JYP's place in the Naisten SM-sarja.

==== JyHC/Cats Jyväskylä ====
The team, which changed its name from JyHC to the Cats Jyväskylä in 2004, found middling success in the Naisten SM-sarja, never finishing above fourth place or below sixth in the league rankings during the period from 2000 to 2009. Former JYP Naiset player Rose Matilainen served as JyHC/Cats Jyväskylä head coach for the 2000–01 to 2006–07 seasons. Notable players from the 2000–2009 JyHC/Cats Jyväskylä era include forwards Emmi Leinonen, Niina Mäkinen, Riikka Noronen, Saila Saari, and Anne Tuomanen; defencemen Pirjo Ahonen and Vilma Tarvainen; and goaltenders Anna-Kaisa Lemberg, Tuula Puputti, and Meeri Räisänen. The JyHC/Cats Jyväskylä were also able to attract several international players, including American goaltender Lisa Davis, Canadian defenceman Sheila Kocay, and Swiss national team goaltender Riitta Arnold-Schäublin.

==== JYP ====
In 2009, the Cats Jyväskylä became affiliated with the JYP Jyväskylä club and changed their name to JYP Naiset, through the team remained under the management of Hockey Cats ry. The team struggled in the first season after the name change, facing potential relegation in the 2009–10 season before saving themselves in the qualifiers. In 2010, 22 year old Mika Väärälä stepped in to the head coaching position and the team measurably improved, qualifying for the playoffs in 2011 and 2012, though they lost in the quarterfinals in both years. Over the 2010 to 2012 period, JYP was able to retain star skaters, like Saila Saari and Suvi Vacker, while also attracting Finnish national ice team talent, including Jenni Hiirikoski and Meeri Räisänen (who returned to the team in this period).

JYP reached a period of historic success in the subsequent seasons, becoming one of the top two dominant teams in the Naisten SM-sarja. The era coincided with Hiirikoski being named team captain in 2012–13 and her impact on the culture of the team and the ability of the club to attract other Finnish national team players was arguably an essential element to the triumphs of team. Over the following several seasons, JYP welcomed a number of elite new players, including Sanni Hakala and Rosa Lindstedt in 2012, IIHF Hall of Fame inductee Riikka Sallinen (née Nieminen, previously Villilä) in 2013, and Tiina Ranne and Marjo Voutilainen in 2014; in addition to Katja Saari assuming the head coaching position in 2013. The team was bolstered by the influx of talent and, though Saari and Hiirikoski continued to be relied upon as the top point earners, the impact of the new players can be seen in the consistent climbing of their individual point totals from 39 and 37 points respectively in the 28 games of the 2012–13 season to both players notching 61 points in the 28 games of the 2014–15 season.

JYP qualified for the Aurora Borealis Cup playoff final in every season of Hiirikoski's captaincy but were defeated three consecutive times by the powerhouse Espoo Blues in 2013, 2014, and 2015. For the 2015–16 season, the club signed even more elite players and iced one of the most skilled rosters in league history, which included Ranne and Räisänen in goal; Hiirikoski, Lindstedt, Emma Ritari, and Ella Viitasuo at the blue line; and Hakala, Sari Kärnä, Tanja Niskanen, Saari, Sallinen, and Voutilainen leading the forward ranks alongside longtime depth players. In the regular season, Hiirikoski scored 17 goals and notched 62 assists in 28 games played, setting the all-time league records for assists in a season and points earned by a defenceman. The efforts of previous seasons were finally rewarded and they claimed the Finnish Championship title, sweeping HPK Kiekkonaiset in the 2016 Aurora Borealis Cup finals.

=== JYP ===
The women's representative team of Hockey Cats ry ceased in 2016, but the club’s secondary team, called JYP-Team, and its junior teams were absorbed by JYP Juniorit ry, the junior affiliate of JYP Jyväskylä Oy. JYP-Team had previously competed in the Naisten Mestis, where it continued to compete after the merger under the name JYP Naiset. Only five JYP Naiset players from the 2015–16 Naisten Liiga team appeared with the 2016–17 Naisten Mestis team as most 2015–16 players chose to transfer to other Naisten Liiga teams or sign with teams in the Swedish Women's Hockey League (SDHL).

JYP Naiset team found consistent success in the Mestis, ranking first in the league twice over the next four seasons and never finishing lower than third. The team gained promotion to the lower division of the Naisten Liiga in the 2020–21 season but were unable to retain their placement and were relegated at the end of the season.

== Season-by-season results ==
This is a partial list of the most recent seasons completed by JYP Naiset.
Note: Finish = Rank at end of regular season; GP = Games played, W = Wins (3 points), OTW = Overtime wins (2 points), T = Ties, OTL = Overtime losses (1 point), L = Losses, GF = Goals for, GA = Goals against, Pts = Points, Top scorer: Points (Goals+Assists)

Season	League	Regular season											Postseason results
Season	League	Finish	GP	W	OTW	T	OTL	L	GF	GA	Pts	Top scorer	Postseason results
2015–16	Naisten SM-liiga	1st	28	27	1	–	0	0	168	26	83	(Finland) J. Hiirikoski 79 (17+62)	Won Championship, 3–0 (HPK)
2015–16	Naisten SM-liiga	1st	28	27	1	–	0	0	168	26	83	(Finland) J. Hiirikoski 79 (17+62)	Financial relegation
2016–17	Naisten Mestis	2nd	26	18	–	2	–	6	117	48	38	(Finland) E. Reittu 42 (19+23)	–
2017–18	Naisten Mestis	3rd	30	26	2	–	0	2	199	33	80	(Finland) T. Paananen 64 (34+30)	–
2018–19	Naisten Mestis	1st	38	23	13	–	0	2	166	86	71	(Finland) Z. Holmström 50 (23+27)	–
2019–20	Naisten Mestis	1st	25	20	2	–	3	0	152	27	66	(Finland) Z. Holmström 54 (27+27)	–
2020–21	Naisten Mestis	1st	13	11	0	–	2	0	65	25	35	(Finland) Z. Holmström 22 (12+10)	Promoted to Naisten Liiga lower division
2020–21	Naisten Liiga	10th	16	1	1	–	3	11	38	76	8	(Finland) A. Vanhala 13 (4+9)	Relegated to Naisten Mestis

== Players and personnel ==
=== Team captaincy history ===
JyP HT Naiset/JYP Naiset (JYP Jyväskylä Oy)

- Ira Salmela, 1993–94 & 1995–96
- Rose Matilainen, 1996–1998

JyHC/Cats Jyväskylä/JYP Naiset (Hockey Cats ry)

- Riikka Sallinen, 2000–01
- Mirka Peltonen, 2005–06
- Vilma Tarvainen, 2007–08
- Maarit Lahtinen, 2008–2010
- Vilma Tarvainen, 2010–11
- Piia Perälä, 2011–12
- Jenni Hiirikoski, 2012–2016

JYP Naiset (JYP Juniorit ry)

- Kati Rein, 2016–17
- Tiina Paananen, 2017–18
- Zaida Holmström, 2018–

Source: Elite Prospects

=== Head coaches ===
JyP HC Naiset/JYP Naiset (JYP Jyväskylä Oy)

- Jussi Melkko, 1996–1999

JyHC/Cats Jyväskylä/JYP Naiset (Hockey Cats ry)

- Seppo Lahtinen, –2000
- Rose Matilainen, 2000–2007
- Mika Väärälä, 2010–2013
- Katja Saari, 2014–2016

JYP Naiset (JYP Juniorit ry)

- Mikko Viitanen, 2016–17
- Perttu Silvennoinen, 2017–18
- Mikko Viitanen, 2018–19
- Patrick Kåla, 2019–20
- Joni Aho, 2020–21
- Shiela Gagnon, 2021–

=== Retired numbers ===
- #13 Riikka Sallinen, 2020

== Team honours ==
=== Finnish Championship ===
- (gold) Champions (3): 1996–97, 1997–98, 2015–16
- (silver) Runners-up (4): 1998–99, 2012–13, 2013–14, 2014–15

=== Individual honours ===
- Riikka Nieminen Award (Player of the Year)
  - 2013 – Jenni Hiirikoski
  - 2014 – Jenni Hiirikoski
  - 2015 – Jenni Hiirikoski
  - 2016 – Jenni Hiirikoski
- Tuula Puputti Award (Goaltender of the Year)
  - 2013 – Meeri Räisänen
  - 2014 – Meeri Räisänen
- Päivi Halonen Award (Defenceman of the Year)
  - 2013 – Jenni Hiirikoski
  - 2014 – Jenni Hiirikoski
  - 2015 – Jenni Hiirikoski
  - 2016 – Jenni Hiirikoski
- Katja Riipi Award (Forward of the Year)
  - 2016 – Tanja Niskanen
- Marianne Ihalainen Award (Most points)
  - 1997 – Riikka Sallinen (née Nieminen, previously Villilä)
  - 2016 – Jenni Hiirikoski
- Sari Fisk Award (Best plus/minus)
  - 2015 – Saila Saari
- Emma Laaksonen Award (Fair-play player)
  - 2013 – Saila Saari
  - 2014 – Tiina Paananen (b. 1985)
  - 2016 – Sanni Hakala
- Karoliina Rantamäki Award (Playoff MVP)
  - 2016 – Riikka Sallinen (née Nieminen, previously Villilä)
- Hannu Saintula Award (Coach of the Year)
  - 2015 – Katja Saari
  - 2016 – Katja Saari

== Notable alumni ==
Years active with JYP Naiset listed alongside player name.

- Sanni Hakala, 2012–2016
- Jenni Hiirikoski, 2010–2016
- Kirsi Hänninen, 1994–95 & 1996–2000
- Sari Kärnä, 2015–16
- Katja Lehto, 1994–95 & 1996–2000
- Anna-Kaisa Lemberg, 2001–02
- Rosa Lindstedt, 2012–2016
- Rose Matilainen, 1996–2000
- Tanja Niskanen, 2015–16
- Riikka Noronen, 1995–2001 & 2004–2009
- Tiina Paananen (b. 1972), 1996–2002
- Tiina Paananen (b. 1985), 2001–2018
- Sanna Peura, 1995–2000 & 2001–02
- Tuula Puputti, 1996–1999 & 2002–2005
- Tiina Ranne, 2014–2016
- Meeri Räisänen, 2011–2014 & 2015–2017
- Saila Saari, 2008–2016
- Riikka Sallinen, 1989–1992, 1994–95, 1996–2002 & 2013–2016
- Hanne Sikiö, 1998–99
- Vilma Tarvainen, 1999–2011
- Ella Viitasuo, 2015–16
- Marjo Voutilainen, 2014–2016

=== International players ===
- (Switzerland) (Finland) Riitta Arnold-Schäublin, 2007–08
- (United States) Lisa Davis, 2008–2010
- (Canada) Sheila Gagnon (née Kocay), 2008–2010
- (Switzerland) Lea Schmid, 2011–12
- (United States) Emily Usset, 2017–18
