= Niina Mäkinen =

Finnish ice hockey player

- Born: 18 April 1992 (age 34) Hankasalmi, Finland
- Height: 1.70 m (5 ft 7 in)
- Weight: 60 kg (132 lb; 9 st 6 lb)
- Position: Right wing
- Shot: Left
- Played for: Kärpät Oulu; Cats Jyväskylä; Team Oriflame
- National team: Finland
- Playing career: 2006–2020
Medal record
World Championship
Bronze medal – third place	2011 Switzerland
Bronze medal – third place	2015 Sweden

Niina Mäkinen (born 18 April 1992) is a Finnish retired ice hockey forward and former member of the Finnish national team. She represented Finland at the IIHF Women's World Championship in 2011, 2013, and 2015.

Her senior club career was played in the Naisten SM-sarja (renamed Naisten Liiga in 2017 and Auroraliiga in 2024) with Cats Jyväskylä, Team Oriflame, and Oulun Kärpät.
