= Team Kuortane =

Auroraliiga ice hockey team in Kuortane, Finland

- City: Kuortane, Finland
- League: Auroraliiga
- Founded: 2010
- Home arena: Kuortaneen jäähalli
- Colours: White, blue
- Owner: Girls Hockey Center Oy
- Head coach: Juuso Nieminen
- Captain: Sofia Kari (2025–26)
- Website: https://ghcfinland.fi/

Franchise history
- 2010–2014: Team Oriflame Kuortane
- 2014–present: Team Kuortane

Championships
- U20 Finnish Championship: 6 (2013, 2014, 2016, 2017, 2018, 2019)

Team Kuortane is an ice hockey team in the Auroraliiga, the premier women's hockey league in Finland. They are based at the Kuortaneen urheilulukio in Kuortane, a small town in South Ostrobothnia, and play at the Kuortaneen jäähalli (lit. 'Kuortane Ice Hall'). The team was founded by the Finnish Ice Hockey Association in 2010 as part of its initiative to develop the ice hockey skills of young women in Finland. Since its creation, approximately half of all national under-18 team rosters have been filled by players from Team Kuortane. For sponsorship reasons, the team was called Team Oriflame Kuortane during 2010 to 2014.

== Season-by-season results ==
List of all seasons completed by Team Kuortane.

Note: Finish = Rank at end of regular season; GP = Games played, W = Wins (3 points), OTW = Overtime wins (2 points), OTL = Overtime losses (1 point), L = Losses, GF = Goals for, GA = Goals against, Pts = Points; Top scorer: Points (Goals+Assists)

Season	League	Preliminaries and regular season										Postseason results
Season	League	Finish	GP	W	OTW	OTL	L	GF	GA	Pts	Top scorer	Postseason results
2010–11	Naisten SM-sarja	9th	16	1	0	2	13	22	77	5	(Finland) S. Valkama 12 (8+4)	Saved in relegation series
2011–12	Naisten SM-sarja	7th	16	6	1	0	9	54	45	20	(Finland) S. Valkama 24 (17+7)	Saved in relegation series
2012–13	Naisten SM-sarja	5th	28	11	2	0	15	67	92	37	(Finland) A. Kilponen 22 (12+10)	Lost quarterfinals, 0–3 (Kärpät)
2013–14	Naisten SM-sarja	7th	28	8	2	3	15	69	100	31	(Finland) S. Valkama 23 (11+12)	Saved in relegation series
2014–15	Naisten SM-sarja	8th	28	3	2	2	21	37	99	15	(Finland) S. Säkkinen 10 (4+6)	Saved in relegation series
2015–16	Naisten SM-sarja	5th	28	9	1	3	15	60	81	32	(Finland) P. Nieminen 23 (15+8)	Lost quarterfinals, 0–2 (Kärpät)
2016–17	Naisten SM-sarja	4th	28	15	2	2	9	88	63	51	(Finland) P. Nieminen 28 (15+13)	Lost quarterfinals, 0–2 (HPK)
2017–18	Naisten Liiga	5th	30	17	0	1	12	102	73	52	(Finland) J. Nylund 58 (30+28)	Won bronze medal, 1–0 (Blues)
2018–19	Naisten Liiga	5th	30	11	1	0	18	111	136	35	(Finland) V. Vainikka 41 (26+15)	Lost quarterfinals, 1–3 (KalPa)
2019–20	Naisten Liiga	5th	30	14	4	2	10	106	100	52	(Finland) V. Vainikka 52 (28+24)	Lost semifinal, 0–3 (Blues); Bronze medal game cancelled due to COVID-19 pandemic
2020–21	Naisten Liiga	8th	27	14	1	1	11	83	69	45	(Finland) S. Sundelin 35 (17+18)	Lost quarterfinals, 0–2 (K-Espoo)
2021–22	Naisten Liiga	6th	27	9	1	2	15	72	104	31	(Finland) S. Sundelin 29 (16+13)	Lost quarterfinals, 0–3 (Kärpät)
2022–23	Naisten Liiga	6th	36	15	3	4	14	91	89	55	(Finland) N. Tervonen 33 (13+20)	Lost quarterfinals, 1–3 (K-Espoo)
2023–24	Naisten Liiga	6th	32	9	2	3	18	65	99	34	(Finland) R. Mustonen 15 (7+8)	Lost quarterfinals, 0–3 (HPK)
2024–25	Auroraliiga	3rd	32	19	3	2	8	115	67	65	(Finland) S. Kari 34 (19+15)	Lost bronze medal game, 1–4 (Ilves)
2025–26	Auroraliiga	4th	32	18	2	2	10	93	72	60	(Finland) S. Kari 40 (22+18)	Lost quarterfinals, 0–3 (Ilves)

== Players and personnel ==
=== 2025–26 roster ===
As of 15 March 2026

No.	Nat	Player	Pos	S/G	Age	Acquired	Birthplace
88	(Finland)	Abigail Byskata	F	R	19	2022	Cebu, Central Visayas, Philippines
29	(Finland)	Katri Huotari	F	L	16	2025	
36	(Finland)	Lilia Huovinen	G	L	20	2022	Helsinki, Uusimaa, Finland
15	(Finland)	Minea Huovinen	F	L	17	2025	Johannesburg, Gauteng, South Africa
3	(Finland)	Oona Hӓmӓlӓinen	D	L	18	2024	Oulunsalo, North Ostrobothnia, Finland
91	(Finland)	Erika Kankkunen (A)	F	L	19	2023	Järvenpää, Uusimaa, Finland
7	(Finland)	Sofia Kari (C)	F	R	21	2020	Alajärvi, South Ostrobothnia, Finland
19	(Finland)	Neea Ketola	D	L	18	2024	Ylöjärvi, Pirkanmaa, Finland
33	(Finland)	Yenna Kolmonen	F	L	16	2024	Vaasa, Ostrobothnia, Finland
9	(Finland)	Aino Krook	D	L	21	2020	Karstula, Central Finland, Finland
10	(Finland)	Fanny Kyrkkö (L)	D	R	16	2025	Ylöjärvi, Pirkanmaa, Finland
31	(Finland)	Kerttu Kuja-Halkola	G	L	19	2023	Janakkala, Kanta-Häme, Finland
17	(Finland)	Jennika Ojala	D	L	20	2021	Soini, South Ostrobothnia, Finland
26	(Finland)	Joanna Ojala	F	L	18	2023	Soini, South Ostrobothnia, Finland
80	(Finland)	Annika Salminen	G	L	17	2025	Hamina, Kymenlaakso, Finland
24	(Finland)	Iina Seppӓnen	F	L	17	2024	
13	(Finland)	Eerika Siekkinen	F	L	20	2022	Pihtipudas, Central Finland, Finland
68	(Finland)	Senja Siivonen	F	L	18	2023	Uusikaupunki, Southwest Finland, Finland
40	(Finland)	Hannele Tarkiainen (A)	D	L	21	2020	Pieksämäki, South Savo, Finland
8	(Finland)	Sarah Tissarinen	D	L	19	2023	
5	(Finland)	Sinna Varjonen	D	L	21	2025	Paimio, Southwest Finland, Finland
20	(Finland)	Jenna Wessman	D	R	18	2025	Paimio, Southwest Finland, Finland

Coaching staff and team personnel

- Head coach: Juuso Nieminen
- Assistant coach: Alexi Salonen
- Goaltender coach: Aku Perälä
- Equipment manager: Janne Hautamaa & Tero Seppӓnen

=== Team captains ===
Team Kuortane logo used during 2014 to 2023

Team Kuortane logo used during 2023 to 2026

- Salla Tammisalo, 2010–11
- Christa Alanko, 2011–12
- Anna Kilponen, 2012–13
- Sara Säkkinen, 2015–2017
- Sini Karjalainen, 2017–18
- Kiia Nousiainen, 2018–19
- Emilia Vesa, 2019–20
- Anna-Lotta Räsänen, 2020–21
- Nea Tervonen, 2021–2023
- Jenniina Kuoppala, September–November 2023
- Peppi Virtanen, December 2023–March 2024
- Kerttu Lehmus, 2024–25
- Sofia Kari, 2025–26

=== Head coaches ===
- Jari Risku, 2010–2018
- Arttu Sissala, 2018–19
- Mira Kuisma, 2019–2023
- Juuso Nieminen, 2023–

== Team honours ==
=== Finnish Championship ===
- (bronze) Aurora Borealis Cup Third Place (1): 2018

=== U20 SM-turnaus ===
The under-20 (U20) Finnish Championship (SM) tournament is a competition for the top women's under-20 ice hockey teams from across Finland. Team Kuortane has medaled at all but two tournaments since the team's founding in 2010. The championship was not held in 2020 or 2021 due to the COVID-19 pandemic.

- (gold) Finnish Champions (6): 2013, 2014, 2016, 2017, 2018, 2019
- (silver) Runner-up (1): 2012, 2023, 2024
- (bronze) Third Place (1): 2011

== Notable alumnae ==
Years active with Team Kuortane listed alongside player name.

- Sini Karjalainen, 2015–2018
- Anni Keisala, 2013–2016
- Anna Kilponen, 2011–2014
- Oona Koukkula, 2018–2022
- Niina Mäkinen, 2010–11
- Petra Nieminen, 2015–2018
- Jenniina Nylund, 2015–2018
- Suvi Ollikainen, 2011–2014
- Tiina Ranne, 2010–2014
- Sanni Rantala, 2017–2021
- Eve Savander, 2014–2018
- Sofianna Sundelin, 2018–2023
- Jenna Suokko, 2012–2014
- Eveliina Suonpää, 2011–2014
- Sara Säkkinen, 2014–2018
- Vilma Tanskanen, 2011–2014
- Viivi Vainikka, 2016–2020
- Saana Valkama, 2010–2014
- Emilia Vesa, 2016–2020
- Ella Viitasuo, 2012–2015
- Kiira Yrjänen, 2017–2021
