= Hanna Kuoppala =

Finnish ice hockey player

- Born: 12 September 1975 (age 51) Jakobstad, Finland
- Height: 179 cm (5 ft 10 in)
- Weight: 76 kg (168 lb; 12 st 0 lb)
- Position: Defence
- Shot: Left
- Played for: Vaasan Sport; KalPa Naiset; Espoo Blues
- National team: Finland
- Playing career: 1996–2007
Medal record
Women's ice hockey
Representing Finland
World Championships
Bronze medal – third place	2004 Canada

Hanna Kuoppala (born 12 September 1975) is a Finnish retired ice hockey player. She played 87 matches with the Finnish national team, including the women's tournament at the 2006 Winter Olympics and the IIHF World Championships in 2001 and 2004.

Kuoppala won seven Finnish Championship gold medals with the Espoo Blues of Finland's Naisten SM-sarja. In Finland, she also played with Vaasan Sport and KalPa Kuopio.
