= Minna Halonen =

Finnish ice hockey goaltender

- Born: 11 October 1975 (age 51) Helsinki, Finland
- Height: 160 cm (5 ft 3 in)
- Weight: 64 kg (141 lb; 10 st 1 lb)
- Position: Goaltender
- Caught: Left
- Played for: Kiekko-Espoo; Tappara Tampere
- National team: Finland
- Playing career: c. 1992–2007
Medal record
World Championship
Bronze medal – third place	2004 Canada

Minna-Monica Halonen (born 11 October 1975) is a Finnish retired ice hockey goaltender. As a member of the Finnish national team, she participated in the IIHF World Women's Championship tournament in 2001 and won a bronze medal at the 2004 tournament. She represented Finland in the women's ice hockey tournament at the 2002 Winter Olympics in Salt Lake City, serving as backup to starter Tuula Puputti.

The entirety of Halonen's club career was played in the Finnish Naisten SM-sarja with Kiekko-Espoo and Tappara Tampere.

== Career statistics ==
=== International ===
Year	Team	Event	Result	GP	W	L	OT	MIN	GA	SO	GAA	SV%
2001	Finland	WW	4th	2	1	1	0	89:41	8	0	5.35	.750
2002	Finland	OG	4th	0	–	–	–	–	–	–	–	–
2004	Finland	WW	3rd place, bronze medalist(s)	1	1	0	0	60:00	0	1	0.00	1.00
Totals				3	2	1	0	149:41	8	1	3.20	.837

== See also ==
- List of Olympic women's ice hockey players for Finland
