= Riikka Noronen =

Finnish ice hockey player and coach

- Born: 23 November 1982 (age 43) Jyväskylä, Finland
- Height: 168 cm (5 ft 6 in)
- Weight: 61 kg (134 lb; 9 st 8 lb)
- Position: Forward
- Shot: Left
- Played for: HPK Hämeenliina; Ilves Tampere; JYP Jyväskylä; Tappara Tampere
- Current NSML coach: Ilves Tampere
- Coached for: HPK Hämeenliina
- National team: Finland
- Playing career: 1995–2022
- Coaching career: 2023–present

Riikka Noronen (born 23 November 1982) is a Finnish ice hockey coach and retired forward, currently an assistant coach with Tampereen Ilves Naiset. The all-time leading point scorer in the Naisten Liiga, she also holds the records for youngest player to ever play in the Naisten Liiga and for most career games played.

== Playing career ==
Noronen began playing in the Naisten SM-sarja (renamed Naisten Liiga in 2017) with JyP HT when she was twelve years old. She holds the records for youngest player to ever play in the league, score a goal, and notch an assist.

Across 25 seasons active in the Naisten Liiga, Noronen played with four clubs: JYP Jyväskylä (also known as JyP HT, JyHC, and Cats Jyväskylä) during 1995–2001 and 2004–2009; Tampereen Ilves during 2000–01, 2002 to 2004, and 2017 to 2019; the women's representative team of Tappara during 2001–02; and HPK Kiekkonaiset during 2008 to 2017 and 2019 to 2022. She won the Finnish Championship three times, first in 1997 with JyP HT, in 1998 with JYP, and, most recently, in 2011 with HPK. As the 2011 Finnish Champions, HPK was the first team to be awarded the Aurora Borealis Cup. Noronen served as HPK captain between 2013 and 2017, until her transfer back to Ilves. Upon her return to HPK, in 2019, she resumed the captaincy.

Noronen first set the Naisten SM-sarja point record in February 2013 with 432 regular season points (202+230) and 52 (22+30) playoff points for 495 total points. However, her record was later broken by Linda Leppänen (née Välimäki), who held the title for most of the later 2010s.

Noronen tied Leppänen's career points record of 702 points on 19 October 2019 in an HPK match against Kiekko-Espoo. The following day, she broke the record, scoring a goal and tallying two assists in a match against Vaasan Sport Naiset, and claimed sole possession of the Naisten Liiga scoring title.

At the conclusion of the 2019–20 season, Noronen had tallied 730 points (313 goals + 417 assists) in 596 Naisten Liiga regular season games across 25 seasons played.

On 19 September 2020, Noronen played her 600th game in the Naisten Liiga, becoming the first player in league history to reach the milestone.

=== International play ===
Noronen was on the roster of the Finnish national under-22 team during 2001 to 2003. She appeared in several international matches with the Finnish national team in 2010 and 2013.
