= Tiina Paananen =

Finnish ice hockey player (born 1972)

- Born: 5 July 1972 (age 54) Jyväskylä, Finland
- Height: 168 cm (5 ft 6 in)
- Weight: 75 kg (165 lb; 11 st 11 lb)
- Position: Centre
- Shot: Right
- Played for: Jyväskylän Hockey Cats; JYP Jyväskylä; KalPa Kuopio
- National team: Finland
- Playing career: 1992–2002
Medal record
Representing Finland
Women's ice hockey
World Championship
Bronze medal – third place	1999 Finland
Bronze medal – third place	1997 Canada

Tiina O. Paananen (born 5 July 1972) is a Finnish retired ice hockey player. She was a member of the Finnish women's national ice hockey teams that won bronze medals at the IIHF Women's World Championships in 1997 and 1999.

Paananen played nine seasons in the Naisten SM-sarja with Kalevan Pallo Naiset (KalPa; 1993–1996), JyP HT Naiset and JYP Jyväskylä Naiset (1996–2000), and the Jyväskylän Hockey Cats (JyHC; 2000–2002). She won the Finnish Championship twice, first with JyP HT in 1997 and again in 1998, after the team was renamed JYP. Throughout her SM-sarja career, Paananen tallied 130 goals and 237 points in 176 regular season games, averaging a blistering 1.35 points per game across nearly a decade of play.

== Career statistics ==
=== International ===
Year	Team	Event	Result	GP	G	A	Pts	PIM
1997	Finland	WW	3rd place, bronze medalist(s)	5	2	0	2	0
1999	Finland	WW	3rd place, bronze medalist(s)	5	0	1	1	0
Totals				10	2	1	3	0
