= Päivi Salo =

Finnish ice hockey player

- Born: 31 January 1974 (age 52) Orimattila, Finland
- Height: 165 cm (5 ft 5 in)
- Weight: 58 kg (128 lb; 9 st 2 lb)
- Position: Defence
- Shot: Left
- Played for: Oulun Kärpät
- National team: Finland
- Playing career: 1994–2002
Medal record
Women's ice hockey
Representing Finland
Olympic Games
Bronze medal – third place	1998 Nagano	Team
World Championships
Bronze medal – third place	1997 Canada

Päivi Anneli Salo (born 31 January 1974) is a Finnish retired ice hockey player. She played 73 matches with the Finnish national team, including in the women's tournament at the 1998 Winter Olympics, where she won a bronze medal, and in the women's tournament at the 2002 Winter Olympics. She also competed at the 1997 IIHF World Championship, where she won a bronze medal with the Finnish national team, and at the 2001 IIHF Women's Championship, where Finland placed fourth.

In Finland, Salo played the entirety of her club career with Oulun Kärpät Naiset of the Naisten SM-sarja, winning four Finnish Championship (SM) silver medals and one SM bronze medal.
