= Henna Savikuja =

Finnish ice hockey player

- Born: 28 March 1978 (age 48) Kalix, Sweden
- Height: 168 cm (5 ft 6 in)
- Weight: 66 kg (146 lb; 10 st 6 lb)
- Position: Forward
- Shot: Left
- Played for: Oulun Kärpät; IHK Helsinki
- National team: Finland
- Playing career: 1995–2014
Medal record
Women's ice hockey
Representing Finland
IIHF World Women's Championships
Bronze medal – third place	2004 Canada
Bronze medal – third place	2000 Canada

Henna Savikuja (born 28 March 1978) is a Finnish retired ice hockey player. She competed in the women's tournament at the 2002 Winter Olympics. Playing with the Finnish national team she won bronze medals at the IIHF World Women's Championships in 2000 and 2004.
