= Jari Risku =

Finnish ice hockey coach

- Born: 11 February 1966 (age 60) Helsinki, Finland
- Height: 173 cm (5 ft 8 in)
- Weight: 69 kg (152 lb; 10 st 12 lb)
- Position: Defense
- Played for: Jokerit
- Current NSML coach: HPK Hämeenlinna
- Coached for: Team Kuortane; Finland U18; Finland (assistant); KMH Budapest; Hungary; Austria
- Playing career: 1984–1988
- Coaching career: 2000–present
Medal record
Representing Finland
Women's ice hockey as assistant coach
Olympic Games
Bronze medal – third place	2010 Torino	Ice hockey
World Championship
Bronze medal – third place	2011 Switzerland
Women's ice hockey as head coach
Universiade
Silver medal – second place	2011 Erzurum	Ice hockey

Jari Risku (born 11 February 1966) is a Finnish ice hockey coach, currently serving as head coach of HPK Kiekkonaiset in the Naisten Liiga. He had a brief career as a professional ice hockey defenceman with Jokerit during 1984 to 1987, appearing in a total of 41 SM-liiga games across three seasons.

== Coaching career ==
Risku most recently served as head coach of the Austrian national team for the 2022 IIHF Women's World Championship Division I Group A and was previously head coach of KMH Budapest in the European Women's Hockey League (EWHL) during the 2018–19 season. He was the first head coach of Team Kuortane from the team's creation in 2010 until 2018 – winning the Hannu Saintula Award in the 2017–18 season – and coached the Finnish national under-18 team during 2014 to 2018. An Olympic medalist as assistant coach of the Finnish national team that played in the women's ice hockey tournament at the 2010 Winter Olympics, he also led the Finnish team to a silver medal as head coach for the women's ice hockey tournament at the 2011 Winter Universiade.
