= Viivi Vainikka =

Finnish ice hockey player (born 2001)

- Born: 23 December 2001 (age 24) Espoo, Uusimaa, Finland
- Height: 1.66 m (5 ft 5 in)
- Weight: 67 kg (148 lb; 10 st 8 lb)
- Position: Left wing
- Shoots: Left
- SDHL team Former teams: Brynäs IF; Team Kuortane; Luleå HF/MSSK
- National team: Finland
- Playing career: 2016–present
Medal record
Olympic Games
Bronze medal – third place	2022 Beijing	Ice hockey
World Championship
Silver medal – second place	2019 Finland
Bronze medal – third place	2021 Canada
Bronze medal – third place	2024 United States
Bronze medal – third place	2025 Czechia

Viivi Vainikka (born 23 December 2001) is a Finnish ice hockey player for Brynäs IF of the Swedish Women's Hockey League (SDHL) and member of the Finnish national team. She was selected by the Minnesota Frost in the 2026 PWHL Draft.

== Playing career ==
Vainikka began playing hockey at the age of five. She made her debut in the Naisten Liiga, the top flight of Finnish women's hockey at the age of 15 with Team Kuortane. Across four years with the team, she scored 129 points in 112 games. After scoring a career-best 52 points in 30 games in the 2018–19 season, including 28 goals, she won the Emma Laaksonen Award for fair play.

She left Finland to sign a two-year contract with Luleå HF/MSSK in Sweden ahead of the 2020–21 SDHL season, joining the roster with the highest concentration of Finnish national team players in the world, Finland included. She scored twice in her first two SDHL games. In November 2020, along with four other Finnish national team and Luleå teammates, she was forced to miss several SDHL games while being quarantined under Finnish law after a national team camp where a player tested positive for COVID-19.

In the 2026 PWHL Draft, she was selected in the second round, 21st overall, by the Minnesota Frost.

== International play ==
Vainikka won silver with the Finnish national team at the 2019 Women's World Championship. She was officially named to the Finnish roster for the 2020 Women's World Championship on 4 March 2020, prior to the cancellation of the tournament International Ice Hockey Federation (IIHF) on 7 March 2020 due to public health concerns surrounding the COVID-19 pandemic.

On 2 January 2026, she was named to Finland's roster to compete at the 2026 Winter Olympics.

== Career statistics ==
=== Regular season and playoffs ===
			Regular season					Playoffs
Season	Team	League	GP	G	A	Pts	PIM	GP	G	A	Pts	PIM
2015–16	Red Wings	Naisten Suomi-sarja	12	18	7	25	6	—	—	—	—	—
2016–17	Team Kuortane	Naisten SM-sarja	28	5	7	12	4	2	0	0	0	0
2017–18	Team Kuortane	Naisten Liiga	24	9	15	24	2	8	4	7	11	0
2018–19	Team Kuortane	Naisten Liiga	30	26	15	41	6	4	2	2	4	0
2019–20	Team Kuortane	Naisten Liiga	30	28	24	52	6	8	12	6	18	8
2020–21	Luleå/MSSK	SDHL	32	13	14	27	22	9	4	4	8	4
2021–22	Luleå/MSSK	SDHL	36	17	22	39	4	12	5	4	9	0
2022–23	Luleå/MSSK	SDHL	32	23	18	41	6	8	5	6	11	0
2023–24	Luleå/MSSK	SDHL	36	23	29	52	0	9	5	1	6	2
2024–25	Luleå/MSSK	SDHL	36	18	26	44	6	9	4	6	10	2
2025–26	Brynäs IF	SDHL	36	11	29	40	4	10	7	6	13	2
SDHL totals			208	105	138	243	42	57	30	27	57	10
Naisten Liiga totals			112	68	61	129	18	22	18	15	33	8

=== International ===
Year	Team	Event	Result	GP	G	A	Pts	PIM
2017	Finland	U18	5th	3	0	0	0	0
2018	Finland	U18	5th	5	2	2	4	0
2019	Finland	U18	3rd place, bronze medalist(s)	6	2	4	6	2
2019	Finland	WC	2nd place, silver medalist(s)	7	1	3	4	0
2021	Finland	WC	3rd place, bronze medalist(s)	7	1	0	1	0
2022	Finland	OG	3rd place, bronze medalist(s)	6	2	1	3	2
2022	Finland	WC	6th	7	2	2	4	0
2023	Finland	WC	5th	7	5	5	10	0
2024	Finland	WC	3rd place, bronze medalist(s)	7	1	0	1	0
2025	Finland	WC	3rd place, bronze medalist(s)	2	0	0	0	0
2026	Finland	OG	6th	5	1	0	1	0
Junior totals				14	4	6	10	2
Senior totals				48	13	11	24	2

== Awards and honors ==
Award	Year
Naisten Liiga
Finnish Championship Bronze Medal	2018
Emma Laaksonen Award	2020
All-Star – Second Team	2020
Player of the Month	January 2020
SDHL
Swedish Championship Gold Medal	2021, 2022
International
World U18 Championship Bronze Medal	2019
World Championship Silver Medal	2019
World Championship Bronze Medal	2021, 2025
Olympic Bronze Medal	2022
