= Mira Kuisma =

Finnish ice hockey goaltender and coach

- Born: 6 May 1987 (age 39) Kuopio, North Savo, Finland
- Height: 1.68 m (5 ft 6 in)
- Weight: 65 kg (143 lb; 10 st 3 lb)
- Position: Goaltender
- Caught: Left
- Played for: KalPa Kuopio; Kärpät Oulu
- National team: Finland
- Playing career: 2003–2011
Medal record
Women's ice hockey
Representing Finland
Olympic Games
Bronze medal – third place	2010 Vancouver	Team
World Championship
Bronze medal – third place	2009 Finland

Mira Kuisma (born 6 May 1987) is a Finnish retired ice hockey goaltender and current head coach of the Finnish women's national under-18 ice hockey team and Team Kuortane of the Naisten Liiga. During her playing career, she was a member of the Finnish national team and won bronze medals at the 2010 Winter Olympics and 2009 IIHF Women's World Championship.

== See also ==
- List of Olympic women's ice hockey players for Finland
