= Saila Saari =

Finnish ice hockey player

- Born: 1 November 1989 (age 36) Alavus, Finland
- Height: 1.70 m (5 ft 7 in)
- Weight: 63 kg (139 lb; 9 st 13 lb)
- Position: Forward
- Shot: Left
- Played for: KalPa Kuopio; Kärpät Oulu; JYP Jyväskylä; Hockey Cats Jyväskylä; APV Alavus
- National team: Finland
- Playing career: 2003–2021
Medal record
Olympic Games
Bronze medal – third place	2018 Pyeongchang	Team
World Championships
Bronze medal – third place	2015 Sweden
Universiade
Bronze medal – third place	2009 Harbin	Ice hockey

Saila Saari (born 1 November 1989) is a Finnish retired ice hockey forward. She represented Finland in the women's ice hockey tournament at the 2018 Winter Olympics, winning a bronze medal, and at the IIHF Women's World Championships in 2015 and 2016.

Saari played the entirety of her club career in the Finnish Naisten Liiga. She is a three-time Aurora Borealis Cup champion, having won the Finnish Championship with JYP Jyväskylä Naiset in 2016 and with Oulun Kärpät Naiset in 2017 and 2018. She was named to the league's All-Star Team in 2014–15 and 2016–17, and was recognized with the Emma Laaksonen Award as the league's fair-play player in 2012–13 and 2017–18.
