= Tanja Niskanen =

Finnish ice hockey player (born 1992)

- Born: 11 September 1992 (age 34) Juankoski, Finland
- Height: 1.76 m (5 ft 9 in)
- Weight: 70 kg (154 lb; 11 st 0 lb)
- Position: Centre
- Shot: Left
- Played for: KalPa Kuopio; JYP Jyväskylä
- National team: Finland
- Playing career: 2010–2022
Medal record
Olympic Games
Bronze medal – third place	2018 Pyeongchang	Ice hockey
Bronze medal – third place	2022 Beijing	Ice hockey
World Championship
Silver medal – second place	2019 Finland
Bronze medal – third place	2017 United States
Bronze medal – third place	2021 Canada

Tanja Niskanen (born 11 September 1992) is a Finnish retired ice hockey player and former member of the Finnish national team. Following her second Olympic bronze medal win in February 2022, she announced her retirement from the national team and, in March 2022, confirmed her intention to step away from elite-level club competition following the 2022 Aurora Borealis Cup playoffs.

== Playing career ==
Niskanen first joined the senior Finnish national team in 2009 and made her major tournament debut at the 2011 IIHF Women's World Championship. Representing Finland, she won bronze medals in the women's ice hockey tournaments at the 2018 Winter Olympics in Pyeongchang and 2022 Winter Olympics in Beijing. She won a silver medal at the IIHF Women's World Championship in 2019, won bronze medals at the tournaments in 2011, 2017 and 2021, and participated in the 2016 IIHF Women's World Championship.

As a junior player with the Finnish national under-18 ice hockey team, Niskanen participated in the IIHF Women's U18 World Championships in 2008, 2009, and 2010.
