= KalPa Naiset =

Naisten Mestis ice hockey team in Kuopio, Finland

- City: Kuopio, Finland
- League: Naisten Mestis
- Founded: 1988; 38 years ago
- Home arena: Kuopion jäähalli Lippumäen jäähalli
- Colours: Black, gold
- General manager: Jukka Koskinen
- Head coach: Artturi Rouhiainen
- Captain: Lunasa Sano (2025–26)
- Affiliates: KalPa Akatemia
- Parent club: Juniori-KalPa ry
- Website: Official website

KalPa Naiset (Note: KalPa is a syllabic abbreviation of the club name Kalevan Pallo, which comprises the genitive form of the name Kaleva, a hero from Finnic-language mythology, and pallo meaning 'ball.' Naiset means 'women' and is used in the team name only when it is necessary to distinguish it from other KalPa teams.) is a Finnish ice hockey team in the Naisten Mestis. Founded in 1990, the team plays at the Kuopion jäähalli (Note: Kuopion jäähalli is also unofficially known as Niiralan Monttu or Niirala) in Kuopio, the largest city in Finland's eastern-central province of North Savo; Lippumäen jäähalli serves as a secondary venue. It is operated by Juniori-KalPa ry, a club comprising many youth and recreational teams that is affiliated with but distinct from KalPa, a men's professional ice hockey team that plays in the Liiga and is operated by KalPa Hockey Oy.

KalPa played in the Finnish premier league during 1990 to 2001 and 2009 to 2026. They were the Aurora Borealis Cup runners-up in 2021, for which they earned Finnish Championship (SM) silver medals, and also won SM bronze five times, in 1995, 1996, 2017, 2023, and 2024.

== History ==
KalPa Naiset has been in continuous operation since the team made its debut in the 1988–89 season of the Naiseten I-divisioona ('Women's 1st-division;' renamed Naisten Mestis in 2012). Despite attracting the highest attendance in the league across ten games played in 1988–89, the team finished the season in last place. Nana Lamberg led the team in scoring, with two goals, and Tuula Kuhmoinen and Marika Lentz tied for second, with one goal and one assist each.

The 1990–91 season marked KalPa's debut in the Naisten SM-sarja, the Finnish Championship league for women's ice hockey in Finland. They finished the regular season in a tie with SaiPa for last place, after both teams amassed just four points across twelve games. KalPa then lost a tie-breaker game to SaiPa and had to play a best-of-three relegation series against the first-placed team in Group A of the Naisten I-divisioona, JoKP. The series was pushed to game three before KalPa secured their place in the Naisten SM-sarja with a 4–3 victory over JoKP in the decisive match.

KalPa qualified for the Aurora Borealis Cup playoff final for the first time in 2020. They were set to face the reigning champions, Kiekko-Espoo, and were guaranteed at least a SM silver medal, which would have been the highest finish in team history to that point, when the playoffs were canceled due to the COVID-19 pandemic before the first game of the series could be played. With the cancellation of the season no Finnish Championship (SM) medals were awarded in 2020.

The team remained among the best performing teams in the league through the following season and were finally able to challenge Kiekko-Espoo for the Aurora Borealis Cup in the 2021 playoff finals. They fell short of the championship title but earned Finnish Championship silver medals as the finals runners-up and secured the best playoff finish in team history.

=== Voluntary relegation ===
Juniori-KalPa ry, the team's parent club, announced in April 2026 that it had selected not to apply for an Auroraliiga license on behalf of KalPa Naiset for the 2026–27 season. The club asserted that the application was not submitted because internal assessment had determined that its operating association did not have the capacity to build and support a competitive Auroraliiga team due to financial limitations and concerns regarding operational changes required under the licensing system.

On 29 April, KalPa Naiset players posted a collective message on the team's Instagram account detailing steps they had taken to keep the team in the Auroraliiga and to highlight "questions about the [Juniori-KalPa] association's values, commitment to equality, and long-term desire to develop the club as a whole" raised by the decision. The players had asked Juniori-KalPa ry to apply for an Auroraliiga license with an exception allowing for team operations to be transferred during the season to a proposed association called KalPa Naiset ry. The team's proposal included a plan for the transfer of team operations under the leadership of an operations board that had already been mustered, a sponsorship group comprising more than 25 local businesses, and eighteen players committed to play for the Auroraliiga team.

The club responded via press release a day after the player message was posted, reiterating that the team would not play in the 2026–27 Auroraliiga season and asserting that the decision was motivated by a desire to create a stronger foundation for women's ice hockey in the future. The press release contained no information regarding how the association intended to strengthen its women's program or its rejection of the player proposal, nor did it respond to any of the specific questions raised in the player message.

== Season-by-season results ==
This is a partial list of the most recent seasons completed by KapPa.
Note: Finish = Rank at end of regular season; GP = Games played, W = Wins (3 points), OTW = Overtime wins (2 points), OTL = Overtime losses (1 point), L = Losses, GF = Goals for, GA = Goals against, Pts = Points, Top scorer: Points (Goals+Assists)

Season	League	Regular season										Postseason results
Season	League	Finish	GP	W	OTW	OTL	L	GF	GA	Pts	Top scorer	Postseason results
2015–16	Naisten SM-sarja	6th	28	7	1	1	19	47	124	24	(Finland) Jo. Juutilainen 32 (10+22)	Lost quarterfinals to HPK, 0–2
2016–17	Naisten SM-sarja	3rd	28	17	1	4	6	100	72	57	(Finland) T. Niskanen 36 (15+21)	(bronze) Won bronze medal game, 1–0 (HPK)
2017–18	Naisten Liiga	6th	30	14	2	1	13	112	92	47	(Finland) T. Niskanen 44 (20+24)	Lost quarterfinals to Blues, 1–3
2018–19	Naisten Liiga	4th	30	19	0	0	11	154	83	57	(Finland) T. Niskanen 79 (31+48)	Lost bronze medal game to Kärpät, 0–1
2019–20	Naisten Liiga	3rd	30	17	4	2	3	124	64	61	(Finland) E. Holopainen 62 (37+25)	Won semifinals, 3–0 (Ilves); Finals cancelled due to COVID-19 pandemic
2020–21	Naisten Liiga	2nd	25	18	1	0	6	121	51	56	(Finland) E. Holopainen 64 (39+25)	(silver) Finals runner-up, 1–3 (K-Espoo)
2021–22	Naisten Liiga	8th	30	8	3	2	17	70	96	32	(Finland) Jo. Juutilainen 34 (9+25)	Lost quarterfinals to K-Espoo, 1–3
2022–23	Naisten Liiga	2nd	36	29	2	2	3	197	65	93	(Finland) E. Holopainen 75 (41+34)	(bronze) Won bronze medal game, 3–1 (HPK)
2023–24	Naisten Liiga	4th	32	18	2	2	10	119	81	60	(Finland) E. Holopainen 57 (32+25)	(bronze) Won bronze medal game, 3–1 (HPK)
2024–25	Auroraliiga	6th	32	10	3	4	15	81	87	40	(Finland) Jo. Juutilainen 27 (13+14)	Lost quarterfinals to Kuortane, 1–3
2025–26	Auroraliiga	8th	32	4	2	6	20	50	114	22	(Finland) E. Pekkarinen 14 (4+10)	Lost quarterfinals to K-Espoo, 0–3

== Players and personnel ==
=== 2025–26 roster ===
As of 24 September 2025

No.	Nat	Player	Pos	S/G	Age	Acquired	Birthplace
15	(Finland)	Sanni Ahola	D	–	19	2025	
26	(Czech Republic)	Marie Chrastinová	D	–	18	2025	Náchod, Hradec Králové Region, Czechia
61	(Finland)	Annika Holopainen	F	–	20	2025	
23	(Finland)	Viivi Iso-Kouvola (A)	F	L	27	2024	Merimasku, Southwest Finland, Finland
35	(Finland)	Aida Jokela	G	–	16	2025	
28	(Finland)	Mimmi Keinonen	D	L	22	2022	
20	(Finland)	Kiira Kettunen	F	L	23	2025	Luumäki, Southern Finland, Finland
6	(Finland)	Viola Kärkkäinen	D	L	17	2024	Kiuruvesi, North Savo, Finland
24	(Finland)	Jemina Lepola	F	L	20	2025	Haapajärvi, North Ostrobothnia, Finland
27	(Czech Republic)	Dominika Malicka	F	L	21	2025	Třinec, Moravian-Silesian Region, Czechia
12	(Finland)	Vilmina Mäkkeli	F	R	17	2025	
–	(Finland)	Aino Määttänen (L)	G	L	16	2025	Joensuu, North Karelia, Finland
11	(Finland)	Kiia Narinen	F	L	23	2025	Lappeenranta, South Karelia, Finland
46	(Finland)	Noora Oksanen	D	L	23	2024	Jyväskylä, Central Finland, Finland
19	(Finland)	Jessica Pappinen	F	L	20	2024	
13	(Finland)	Emilia Pekkarinen	F	L	28	2021	
45	(Finland)	Veera Pohjala (A)	D	L	25	2021	
21	(Finland)	Veera Puurula	F	L	18	2025	
59	(Finland)	Ramona Riekkinen	F	–	16	2025	
4	(Finland)	Anniina Rissanen	D	–	29	2025	
34	(Finland)	Annika Saastamoinen	G	L	19	2025	Kokkola, Central Ostrobothnia, Finland
17	(Finland)	Alene Sankala	D	L	21	2025	
7	(Japan)	Lunasa Sano (C)	F	L	28	2023	Tokyo, Kantō, Japan
33	(Finland)	Salla Sivula (A)	G	L	28	2024	Tampere, Pirkanmaa, Finland
9	(Finland)	Vilma Sneck (A)	F	L	25	2022	Lapinlahti, North Savo, Finland
22	(Finland)	Venla Tulppo	F	L	21	2024	

Coaching staff and team personnel

- Head coach: Artturi Rouhiainen
- Assistant coach: Jere Hakkarainen
- Assistant coach: Sami Tapaninen
- Goaltending coach: Joonas Rantanen
- Conditioning coach: Tiia Kukkonen
- Conditioning coach: Jaakko Uhlbäck
- Team managers: Mari Leskinen
- Equipment managers: Jarno Hakkarainen & Jari Hämäläinen

=== Team captains ===
- Johanna Juutilainen, 2010–11
- Isa Rahunen, 2011–12
- Marjo Voutilainen, 2012–13
- Venla Hovi & Anni Kettunen, 2013–14
- Johanna Juutilainen, 2015–2018
- Tanja Niskanen, 2018–19
- Tiina Ranne & Emma Ritari, 2019–20
- Emma Ritari, 2020–21
- Johanna Juutilainen, 2021–2024
- Elli Mäkelä, 2024–25
- Lunasa Sano, 2025–

=== Head coaches ===
- Mikko Miettinen, –2000
- Seppo Tirronen, 2000–
- Marjo Voutilainen, 2016–2022
- Mika Väärälä, 2022–2024
- Artturi Rouhiainen, 2024–

== Awards and honours ==
=== Finnish Championship ===
- (silver) Aurora Borealis Cup Runners-up (1): 2021
- (bronze) Third Place (4) : 1995, 1996, 2017, 2023. 2024

=== Individual awards ===
- Riikka Nieminen Award (Player of the Year)

- 2023–24: Elisa Holopainen
- 2022–23: Elisa Holopainen
- 2020–21: Elisa Holopainen
- 2019–20: Tanja Niskanen
- 2018–19: Elisa Holopainen

- Katja Riipi Award (Best forward)

- 2023–24: Elisa Holopainen
- 2022–23: Elisa Holopainen
- 2021–22: Elisa Holopainen
- 2020–21: Elisa Holopainen
- 2019–20: Elisa Holopainen
- 2018–19: Elisa Holopainen

- Marianne Ihalainen Award (Top point scorer)

- 2018–19: Elisa Holopainen

- Tiia Reima Award (Top goal scorer)

- 2022–23: Elisa Holopainen
- 2021–22: Matilda Nilsson
- 2020–21: Matilda Nilsson
- 2019–20: Elisa Holopainen
- 2018–19: Elisa Holopainen

- Sari Fisk Award (Best plus–minus)

- 2019–20: Matilda Nilsson

- Emma Laaksonen Award (Fair-play player)

- 2023–24: Johanna Juutilainen
- 2022–23: Jenna Hietala
- 2020–21: Johanna Juutilainen
- 2016–17: Tanja Niskanen

- Hannu Saintula Award (Coach of the Year)

- 2019–20: Marjo Voutilainen

==== Player of the Month ====
- November 2023: Elisa Holopainen
- November 2022: Elisa Holopainen
- September 2020: Elisa Holopainen
- September 2019: Matilda Nilsson

=== All-Stars ===
First Team

- 2023–24: Elisa Holopainen (LW), Sanni Rantala (D)
- 2022–23: Elisa Holopainen (LW), Sanni Rantala (D)
- 2020–21: Elisa Holopainen (LW), Matilda Nilsson (RW)
- 2019–20: Elisa Holopainen (LW), Matilda Nilsson (RW), Tanja Niskanen (C)
- 2018–19: Elisa Holopainen (LW), Tanja Niskanen (C)
- 2014–15: Matilda Nilsson (F)

Second Team

- 2022–23: Jenna Kaila (LW), Adalmiina Makkonen (D), Tiina Ranne (G)
- 2020–21: Tiina Ranne (G)
- 2019–20: Tiina Ranne (G)
- 2018–19: Matilda Nilsson (RW)
- 2017–18: Elisa Holopainen (LW), Matilda Nilsson (RW)

== Team records ==
Various individual KalPa Naiset player records achieved through the end of the 2022–23 season.

=== Regular season ===
Single-season records

- Most points: Tanja Niskanen, 79 points (29 games; 2018–19)
- Most points in a season, defenseman: Sanni Rantala, 39 points (30 games; 2022–23)
- Most goals: Elisa Holopainen, 41 goals (28 games; 2022–23)
- Most assists: Tanja Niskanen, 48 assists (29 games; 2018–19)
- Best points per game, over ten games played:

- Elisa Holopainen, 3.00 P/G (19 games; 2023–24)
- Marjo Voutilainen, 3.00 P/G (14 games; 1997–98)

- Most penalty minutes: Kirsi Hänninen, 66 PIM (23 games; 1995–96)
- Best save percentage (Sv%), over five games played: Tiina Ranne, .942 Sv% (18 games; 2019–20)
- Best goals against average (GAA), over five games played: Jenna Juutilainen, 1.49 GAA (10 games; 2022–23)
- Most shutouts in a season: Tiina Ranne, 3 shutouts (accomplished in three different seasons)

- 20 games; 2022–23
- 18 games; 2018–19
- 14 games; 2020–21

Career records

- Most points: Tanja Niskanen, 488 points (301 games; 2006–2022)
- Most points, defenseman: Tanja Koljonen, 103 points (137 games; 2016–2023)
- Most goals: Tanja Niskanen, 257 goals (301 games; 2006–2022)
- Most assists: Johanna Juutilainen, 260 assists (348 games; 2009–2024)
- Best points per game, over 30 games played: Elisa Holopainen, 2.15 points per game (176 games; 2016–2024)
- Most penalty minutes: Salla Rantanen, 322 PIM (272 games; 2012–2023)
- Most games played, skater: Johanna Juutilainen, 348 games (2009–2024)
- Most games played, goaltender: Tiina Ranne, 130 games (2017–2024)
- Best save percentage, over twenty games played: Tiina Ranne, .921 Sv% (130 games; 2017–2024)
- Best career goals against average, over twenty games played: Tiina Ranne, 2.41 GAA (130 games; 2017–2024)
- Most shutouts: Tiina Ranne, 17 shutouts (130 games; 2017–2024)

=== All-time scoring leaders ===
The top regular season point scorers in KalPa Naiset history, as of June 2024.

Note: Nat = Nationality; Pos = Position; GP = Games played; G = Goals; A = Assists; Pts = Points; P/G = Points per game; = 2024–25 KalPa player

Points
Nat	Player	Pos	GP	G	A	Pts	P/G
(Finland)	Tanja Niskanen	F	301	257	231	488	1.62
(Finland)	Johanna Juutilainen	F	348	162	260	422	1.21
(Finland)	Elisa Holopainen	F	176	206	173	379	2.15
(Finland)	Matilda Nilsson	F	189	164	140	304	1.61
(Finland)	Salla Rantanen	F	272	97	112	209	0.77
(Finland)	Marjo Voutilainen	F	177	86	101	187	1.06
(Finland)	Tanja Koljonen	D	169	26	91	117	0.69
(Finland)	Liisa Kastikainen	F	199	54	63	117	0.59
(Finland)	Kati Kovalainen	F	70	72	35	107	1.53
(Finland)	Emma Ritari	D	251	34	68	102	0.41
(Finland)	Eija Rahunen	F	80	28	54	82	1.03
(Finland)	Tiina Paananen	F	58	46	35	81	1.40
(Finland)	Isa Rahunen	D	135	34	47	81	0.60
(Finland)	Kaisla Kortelainen	F	120	29	46	75	0.63
(Finland)	Venla Hovi	F	49	38	36	74	1.51

== Notable alumni ==
Years active with KalPa listed alongside player name.

- Elisa Holopainen, 2016–2021 & 2022–2024
- Venla Hovi, 2012–2014
- Kirsi Hänninen, 1995–96
- Kati Kovalainen, 1993–1996
- Rose Matilainen, 1993–1996
- Terhi Mertanen, 1999–2001
- Matilda Nilsson, 2014–2021
- Tanja Niskanen, 2006–2008, 2009–2015 & 2016–2022
- Oona Parviainen, 1993–1999
- Tuula Puputti, 1992–1995
- Isa Rahunen, 2006–2013
- Sanni Rantala, 2022–2024
- Saila Saari, 2020–21
- Riikka Sallinen, 1995–96
- Eve Savander, 2013–14
- Marjo Voutilainen, 1995–2001 & 2010–2014

=== International player(s) ===
- (Canada) Emma Hall, 2024–25
- (Japan) Nozomi Kiribuchi, 2015–16
- (Canada) (Hungary) Sarah Knee, 2022–23
- (Japan) Kokoro Ota, 2024–25

== Bibliography ==
=== References ===
- Aaltonen, Juha, ed. (6 December 2025). Jääkiekkokirja 2026 [Ice Hockey Book 2026] (in Finnish).
