= Kärpät Naiset =

Auroraliiga ice hockey team in Oulu, Finland

Oulun Kärpät Naiset
- City: Oulu, Finland
- League: Auroraliiga
- Founded: 1990
- Home arena: Raksila 2
- Colours: Black, yellow, white
- General manager: Mika Kaijankoski
- Head coach: Teemu Koivula
- Captain: Aino Kaijankoski
- Affiliates: Kärpät Akatemia
- Parent club: Oulun Kärpät 46 ry
- Website: Official website

Championships
- Regular season titles: 2 (1996–97, 2016–17)
- Aurora Borealis Cup: 3 (2011–12, 2016–17, 2017–18)

Current uniform
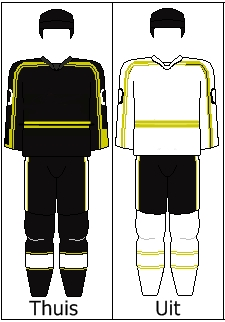

Oulun Kärpät Naiset (lit. 'Oulu's Ermine Women') are an ice hockey team in the Auroraliiga. They play in Oulu, a city on the northeastern coast of the Bothnian Bay in the Finnish north-central region of North Ostrobothnia, at the Raksilan harjoitusjäähalli (lit. 'Raksila training ice rink'; also known as Raksila 2) of Oulun Energia Areena. Ilves have won the Aurora Borealis Cup three times, in 2012, 2017, and 2018.

The team’s parent club, Oulun Kärpät 46 ry, is the junior affiliate of the Liiga team Oulun Kärpät and the teams are loosely affiliated through that association.

== Season-by-season results ==
This is a partial list of the most recent seasons completed by Oulun Kärpät Naiset.
Note: Finish = Rank at end of regular season; GP = Games played, W = Wins (3 points), OTW = Overtime wins (2 points), OTL = Overtime losses (1 point), L = Losses, GF = Goals for, GA = Goals against, Pts = Points, Top scorer: Points (Goals+Assists)

| Season | League | Regular season | | | | | | | | | | Postseason results |
| Season | League | Finish | GP | W | OTW | OTL | L | GF | GA | Pts | Top scorer | Postseason results |
|---|---|---|---|---|---|---|---|---|---|---|---|---|
| 2016–17 | Naisten SM-sarja | 1st | 28 | 18 | 5 | 1 | 1 | 100 | 41 | 65 | (Finland) S. Saari 39 (12+27) | Won Championship, 3–2 (United) |
| 2017–18 | Naisten Liiga | 2nd | 30 | 17 | 4 | 3 | 6 | 147 | 62 | 62 | (Finland) S. Tarkki 52 (19+33) | Won Championship, 3–1 (Ilves) |
| 2018–19 | Naisten Liiga | 3rd | 30 | 19 | 1 | 1 | 9 | 147 | 70 | 60 | (Finland) S. Tarkki 57 (23+34) | Won bronze medal, 1–0 (KalPa) |
| 2019–20 | Naisten Liiga | 2nd | 30 | 19 | 3 | 1 | 7 | 90 | 53 | 64 | (Finland) S. Saari 35 (15+20) | Lost semifinals to KalPa, 2–3 |
| 2020–21 | Naisten Liiga | 7th | 29 | 15 | 0 | 2 | 12 | 98 | 73 | 47 | (Finland) A. Antti-Roiko 27 (8+19) | Lost quarterfinals to KalPa, 0–2 |
| 2021–22 | Naisten Liiga | 3rd | 29 | 16 | 2 | 0 | 11 | 85 | 62 | 52 | (Finland) O. Havana 27 (13+14) | Won bronze medal game, 1–0 (TPS) |
| 2022–23 | Naisten Liiga | 8th | 36 | 7 | 1 | 5 | 23 | 92 | 150 | 28 | (Finland) O. Havana 36 (23+13) | Lost quarterfinals to HIFK, 0–3 |
| 2023–24 | Naisten Liiga | 7th | 32 | 7 | 2 | 2 | 21 | 69 | 133 | 27 | (Finland) E. Ekoluoma 27 (16+11) | Lost quarterfinals to HIFK, 0–3 |
| 2024–25 | Auroraliiga | 8th | 32 | 5 | 0 | 0 | 27 | 48 | 128 | 15 | (Finland) A. Antti-Roiko 16 (3+13) | Lost quarterfinals to K-Espoo, 0–3 |
| 2025–26 | Auroraliiga | 7th | 32 | 7 | 2 | 1 | 22 | 88 | 134 | 26 | (Finland) S. Wäänänen 34 (17+17) | Lost quarterfinals to HPK, 1–3 |

== Players and personnel ==
=== 2025–26 roster ===
As of 18 March 2026

| No. | Nat | Player | Pos | S/G | Age | Acquired | Birthplace |
|---|---|---|---|---|---|---|---|
| 39 | (Finland) | Kati Asikainen | G | L | 29 | 2020 | Haukipudas, North Ostrobothnia, Finland |
| 18 | (Finland) | Ella-Sofia Hautala | F | L | 18 | 2024 | Kokkola, Central Ostrobothnia, Finland |
| 64 | (Finland) | Sara Holopainen | D | L | 19 | 2025 | Vantaa, Uusimaa, Finland |
| 16 | (Finland) | Aino Kaijankoski (C) | D | L | 26 | 2016 | Siikajoki, North Ostrobothnia, Finland |
| 13 | (Finland) | Katri Kivimäki | D | L | 19 | 2025 | |
| 26 | (Finland) | Inna Korpi-Halkola | F | L | 19 | 2022 | Kolari, Lapland, Finland |
| 32 | (Finland) | Olivia Laitamäki | F | L | 22 | 2024 | Nurmo, South Ostrobothnia, Finland |
| 14 | (Finland) | Martta Lampinen | F | L | 17 | 2024 | |
| 34 | (Finland) | Emmi Loponen | F | L | 17 | 2025 | Oulu, North Ostrobothnia, Finland |
| 8 | (Slovakia) | Alexandra Mateičková | D | L | 19 | 2024 | Ružinov, Bratislava Region, Slovakia |
| 46 | (Finland) | Daria Molchun (L) | F | L | 16 | 2025 | Petrozavodsk, Karelia, Russia |
| 9 | (Finland) | Elisa Pekkala | F | L | 27 | 2024 | Rovaniemi, Lapland, Finland |
| 1 | (Finland) | Emilia Piekkari | G | L | 19 | 2023 | Keminmaa, Lapland, Finland |
| 21 | (Finland) | Olivia Pinola | D | R | 20 | 2023 | Kärsämäki, North Ostrobothnia, Finland |
| 42 | (Finland) | Emmi Puusaari | F | L | 20 | 2021 | Liminka, North Ostrobothnia, Finland |
| 33 | (Finland) | Ronja Pätsi | G | L | 21 | 2024 | Kuusamo, North Ostrobothnia, Finland |
| 55 | (Finland) | Venla Rauhala | F | – | 17 | 2025 | |
| 29 | (Finland) | Nea Ronkainen | F | L | 16 | 2025 | Kemi, Lapland, Finland |
| 12 | (Finland) | Viivi-Maija Ruonakoski (A) | D | L | 16 | 2025 | Liminka, North Ostrobothnia, Finland |
| 96 | (Finland) | Edla Similä | F | L | 22 | 2025 | |
| 19 | (Finland) | Siiri Tolonen | D | L | 16 | 2025 | Ii, North Ostrobothnia, Finland |
| 28 | (Finland) | Minttu Tukiainen | F | L | 19 | 2022 | Lapinlahti, North Savo, Finland |
| 25 | (Finland) | Noora Tukiainen | D | L | 27 | 2021 | Lapinlahti, North Savo, Finland |
| 17 | (Finland) | Linnea Tulkki | F | L | 22 | 2025 | |
| 22 | (Finland) | Ada Ukkola | D | L | 28 | 2025 | Oulu, North Ostrobothnia, Finland |
| 0 | (Finland) | Erika Vitikka | G | L | 15–16 | 2025 | Oulu, North Ostrobothnia, Finland |
| 7 | (Finland) | Sari Wäänänen | F | L | 33 | 2014 | Ylikiiminki, North Ostrobothnia, Finland |
| 27 | (Finland) | Jasmine Ylitalo (A) | F | L | 25 | 2021 | Kalajoki, North Ostrobothnia, Finland |

Coaching staff and team personnel

- Head coach: Teemu Koivula
- Assistant coach: Lilli Antinmäki
- Assistant coach: Niko Pernu
- Goaltending coach: Jani Erkinmikko
- Conditioning coach: Arto Roukala
- Team managers: Jukka Välitalo
- Equipment managers: Veli-Matti Puusaari, Niina Ronkainen, Jari Siermala & Keijo Vähäkuopus
- Physical therapist: Samu Siermala

=== Team captains ===
- Katja Riipi, 1997–98
- Päivi Salo, 2001–02
- Eini Lehtinen, 2004–2008
- Mira Jalosuo, 2008–09
- Saija Tarkki, 2009–10
- Anne Helin, 2010–2013
- Niina Mäkinen, 2013–14
- Isa Rahunen, 2014–2019
- Saila Saari, 2019–20
- Suvi Käyhkö, 2020–2022
- Aino Kaijankoski, 2022–

=== Head coaches ===
- Kari Ikonen & Pasi Sorvisto, 1994–1997
- Kari Ikonen, Katri Niemelä & Pasi Sorvisto, 1997–98
- Kari Ikonen & Pasi Sorvisto, 1998–99
- Risto Liikka, 1999–2003
- Lauri Merikivi, 2007–2010
- Seppo Karjalainen, 2012–13
- Mira Kuisma, 2015–2019
- Janne Salmela, 2019–2021
- Samuli Hassi, 2021–22
- Sanna Lankosaari, 2022–13 October 2023
- Saija Tarkki (interim), 13–31 October 2023
- Satu Kiipeli, 31 October 2023 – 30 April 2024
- Teemu Koivula, 1 May 2024 –

=== General managers ===
- Eero Sirviö, 2012–2019
- Saija Tarkki, 2019–2022
- Timo Karjalainen, 2022–23
- Mika Kaijankoski, 2023–

== Team honors ==
=== Finnish Champions ===
The winner of the Naisten Liiga playoffs receives the Aurora Borealis Cup and earns the Finnish Champion title, with gold medals awarded to each player. The Aurora Borealis Cup was first awarded at the conclusion of the 2010–11 Naisten SM-sarja postseason. Prior to 2011, the Naisten SM-sarja champion received the Sammon -malja.

- (gold) Aurora Borealis Cup (3): 2012, 2017, 2018
- (silver) Runners-up (7): 1996, 1998, 2000, 2001, 2003, 2006, 2007
- (bronze) Third Place (7): 2002, 2004, 2005, 2008, 2011, 2013, 2019, 2022

=== IIHF European Women's Champions Cup ===
- (bronze) Bronze (1): 2013

== Notable alumni ==
Years active with Kärpät listed alongside player name.

- Susanna Airaksinen, 2009–2022
- Anna-Kaisa Antti-Roiko, 2019–2025
- Kati Asikainen, 2013–14 & 2020–2024
- Oona Havana, 2019–2024
- Anne Helin, 2008–2013
- Satu Hoikkala (-Auno), 2000–2008
- Mira Jalosuo, 2004–2009 & 2016–2018
- Satu Kiipeli, 1991–2000 & 2008–2015
- Mira Kuisma, 2004–2011
- Suvi Käyhkö, 2011–2022
- Sanna Lankosaari, 1994–2001
- Eini Lehtinen, 1995–2008
- Mira Jalosuo, 2004–2009 & 2016–2018
- Niina Mäkinen, 2011–2020
- Marjo Mäyrä, 1994–2002
- Johanna Oksman, 2015–2022
- Jenni Pitkänen, 2001–2010
- Marja-Helena Pälvilä, 1995–2001, 2002–2006 & 2012–13
- Isa Rahunen, 2013–2021
- Katja Riipi, 1994–1999
- Saila Saari, 2016–2020
- Päivi Salo, 1994–2002
- Satu Salonpää, 1990–2003
- Henna Savikuja, 1995–2005 & 2006–2012
- Saija Sirviö (-Tarkki), 1997–2010 & 2011–2019
- Niina Tikkinen, 2005–2007 & 2011–2015

=== International players ===
- (Slovakia) Michaela Matejová, 2008–09
- (Sweden) Marianne Mattila, 1994–95
- (Denmark) Josefine Quaade, 2000–01
- (Czech Republic) Karolína Skořepová, 2022–2025

== See also ==
- Women's ice hockey in Finland
