= 2020–21 Naisten Liiga season =

38th season of the Naisten Liiga

- League: Naisten Liiga
- Sport: Ice hockey
- Duration: Preliminaries; 5 September – 29 November; Regular season 8 January – 28 February; Playoffs; 3 March – 25 March
- Games: 25–29
- Teams: 11 in Preliminary series 6 in Regular season, 6 in Lower division series
- TV partner: Ruutu+

Regular Season
- Season champions: Kiekko-Espoo
- Runners-up: KalPa Kuopio
- Season MVP: Elisa Holopainen (KalPa)
- Top scorer: Michaela Pejzlová (HIFK)
- Promoted to Lower division series: JYP Jyväskylä
- Relegated to 2021–22 Naisten Mestis: JYP Jyväskylä; Lukko Rauma

Aurora Borealis Cup Playoffs
- Aurora Borealis Cup Playoffs MVP: Tiia Pajarinen
- Finals champions: Kiekko-Espoo
- Runners-up: KalPa Kuopio

Seasons
- ← 2019–20 2021–22 →

The 2020–21 Naisten Liiga season was the thirty-eighth season of the Naisten Liiga, Finland's elite women's ice hockey league, since the league's creation in 1982. The season began, as scheduled, on 5 September 2020, making the Naisten Liiga the first women's national ice hockey league in Europe and, quite likely, in the world to return to play for the 2020–21 season.

== League business ==
=== Number of teams ===
When the 2019–20 Naisten Liiga season was cancelled due to the COVID-19 pandemic, the league qualification series (Finnish: karsintasarja) had not been completed. At the time of cancellation, Lukko Naiset had amassed an unreachable points advantage and secured their place in the Naisten Liiga and APV Naiset had been mathematically relegated to the Naisten Mestis but it was still possible for either RoKi Naiset or TPS Naiset to qualify. Recognizing that it would be unfair to relegate either RoKi or TPS, the Finnish Ice Hockey Association announced that both teams would participate in the 2020–21 Naisten Liiga season, increasing the number of teams in the preliminary round from ten to eleven.

=== League placement rankings ===
In an effort to account for expected cancellations of some matches due to COVID-19 safety protocols, the Finnish Ice Hockey Association announced league rankings would be determined by the average points per game of each team rather than the absolute point total traditionally used. For example, a team with two wins in two games played (6 points total, average 3.0) ranks higher in the league table than a team with four wins, one overtime loss, and one regulation loss (13 points total, average 2.17).

=== Coaching changes ===
Team	2019–20	2020–21	Details
Off–season
HPK Kiekkonaiset	Katja Pasanen	Mari Saarinen	Pasanen was fired by GM Jorma Hassinen after HPK lost in the 2019–20 Naisten Liiga quarterfinals, despite having what Hassinen believed to be the fourth-best roster in team history. Saarinen was promoted from assistant coach to head coach shortly thereafter. Saarinen retired from playing in 2012 and previously served as head coach of Ilves Naiset during the 2016–17 and 2017–18 seasons.
Tampereen Ilves Naiset	Ville Tolvanen	Linda Välimäki Leppänen	In February 2020, Ilves announced Välimäki Leppänen had signed as head coach of Ilves Naiset for the 2020–21 season. Välimäki Leppänen retired from playing in 2019 and served as director of Ilves' girls' hockey department for several years prior to her appointment as head coach of the women's team.
Mid-season
Lukko Naiset	Marko Toivonen	Sami Piilikangas	Toivonen resigned in late November and assistant coach Piilikangas assumed head coaching duties on 24 November.
Vaasan Sport Naiset	Marko Haapala	Susanne Uppgård	Health issues prompted Haapala to step away from his role as head coach and assistant coach Uppgård took his place on 1 December 2020.
TPS Naiset	Matti Tähkäpää	Kai Ortio	Tähkäpää was relieved and replaced by assistant coach Kai Ortio on 11 February 2021. At the time of the coaching change, TPS had five remaining games in the regular season and were guaranteed a playoff berth. Ortio previously served as head coach to men's junior teams of TUTO Hockey in the U18 Mestis and U20 Mestis.

== Teams ==
Location of teams in the Naisten Liiga
: Upper division;: Lower division

Team	Location	Home venue	Head coach	Captain
Stadin Gimmat or HIFK Naiset	Helsinki	Helsingin jäähalli	Saara Niemi	Karoliina Rantamäki
HPK Kiekkonaiset	Hämeenlinna	Metritriski Areena	Mari Saarinen	Riikka Noronen
Ilves Naiset	Tampere	Tesoman jäähalli	Linda Leppänen	Anna Kilponen
KalPa Naiset	Kuopio	Olvi Areena	Marjo Voutilainen	Emma Ritari
Kiekko-Espoo Naiset	Espoo	Tapiolan harjoitussareena	Sami Haapanen	Annina Rajahuhta
Kärpät Naiset	Oulu	Oulun Energia Areena	Janne Salmela	Suvi Käyhkö
Lukko Naiset	Rauma	Kivikylän Areena	Sami Piilikangas	Maija Koski
RoKi Naiset	Rovaniemi	Lappi Areena	Tuomas Liitola	Jenna Pirttijärvi
Sport Naiset	Vaasa	Vaasan Sähkö Arena	Susanne Uppgård	Pauliina Suoniemi
Team Kuortane	Kuortane	Kuortaneen jäähalli	Mira Kuisma	Anna-Lotta Räsänen
TPS Naiset	Turku	Marli Areena	Kai Ortio	Elina Heikkinen
Team promoted from the Naisten Mestis to the lower division
JYP Naiset	Jyväskylä	Jyväskylän harjoitusjäähall	Joni Aho	Zaida Holmström

== Preliminary series ==
The addition of another team necessitated slight modification of the season format introduced for the 2019–20 season. With eleven participating teams, the twenty-game preliminary series (Finnish: alkusarja) was played strictly as a double round-robin without the addition of the two extra Opening Weekend Tournament games typically needed. The preliminaries were scheduled to be played during 5 September to 13 December 2020.

The season began as scheduled on 5 September 2020, making the Naisten Liiga the first women's national ice hockey league in Europe – and, quite possibly, in the world – to return to play for the 2020–21 season. The first game of the season saw Ilves Tampere beat TPS Turku 4–3 in overtime at Tesoman jäähalli.

On 1 December 2020, an emergency meeting of the Finnish Ice Hockey Association was held in response to a significant rise in cases and hospitalizations related to the COVID-19 pandemic in Finland during the preceding weeks. It was ultimately determined that all leagues under the Association's administration would suspend play from 2 to 31 December 2020, including the Naisten Liiga. The Naisten Liiga was expected to begin the regular season and lower division series in January, as outlined in the original season schedule, though the Finnish Ice Hockey Association expressed a desire to stage the games postponed during the period of suspended activity when play resumed.

Later in December, it was decided that Naisten Liiga teams would not attempt to play the games missed during the pause and would instead proceed directly to the regular season. With this determination, 29 November 2020 retroactively became the last day of the preliminary series, as it was the last day in which Naisten Liiga games were contested before the suspension.

=== Standings ===
Kiekko-Espoo and KalPa, the two teams from the cancelled 2020 Aurora Borealis Cup final, continued to dominate the league in the preliminaries, ranking first and second at the conclusion of the series. Less expected were the third and fourth ranked teams, HIFK and TPS, which had both played in the lower division during the previous season and TPS had very nearly been eliminated in the 2020 qualifiers. Both teams were bolstered in the 2020–21 season by an influx of international talent.

Kiekko-Espoo were the regular season champions for the third consecutive season.

Pos	Team	Pld	W	OTW	OTL	L	GF	GA	GD	Pts	Placement
1	Kiekko-Espoo	18	15	0	0	3	88	24	+64	45	Regular season
2	KalPa	18	14	1	0	3	94	34	+60	44	Regular season
3	HIFK	19	11	4	0	4	77	42	+35	41	Regular season
4	TPS	18	10	1	2	5	75	55	+20	34	Regular season
5	Ilves	19	9	2	3	5	60	42	+18	34	Regular season
6	HPK	19	10	1	2	6	62	48	+14	34	Regular season
7	Team Kuortane	17	7	0	1	9	50	52	−2	22	Lower division
8	Kärpät	19	7	0	2	10	65	56	+9	23	Lower division
9	RoKi	19	6	1	0	12	34	82	−48	20	Lower division
10	Lukko	17	1	0	0	16	26	108	−82	3	Lower division
11	Sport	17	0	0	0	17	16	104	−88	0	Lower division

Updated to match(es) played on 29 November 2020. Source: Suomen Jääkiekkoliitto

Official ranking

Pos	Team	PpG
1	K-Espoo	2.50
2	KalPa	2.44
3	HIFK	2.16
4	TPS	1.89
5	Ilves	1.79
6	HPK	1.79

Pos	Team	PpG
7	Kuortane	1.29
8	Kärpät	1.21
9	RoKi	1.05
10	Lukko	0.18
11	Sport	0.00

=== Statistics ===
Scoring leaders

The following players led the league in points at the conclusion of the preliminaries on 29 November 2020.

	Player	Team	GP	G	A	Pts	PIM
1	Elisa Holopainen	KalPa	18	32	22	54	4
2	Estelle Duvin	TPS	18	18	22	40	51
3	Emmanuelle Passard	HIFK	19	15	20	35	4
4	Matilda Nilsson	KalPa	15	11	20	31	6
5	Nelli Laitinen	K-Espoo	16	11	19	30	10
6	Jenna Suokko	Ilves	19	17	11	28	20
7	Riikka Noronen	HPK	19	9	18	27	6
8	Maija Otamo	TPS	17	15	11	26	6
9	Clara Rozier	HIFK	19	10	15	25	22
10	Annina Rajahuhta	K-Espoo	17	12	12	24	16
11	Michaela Pejzlová	HIFK	14	10	14	24	0

Leading goaltenders

The following goaltenders lead the league in save percentage at the conclusion of the preliminaries on 29 November 2020, while starting at least one third of matches.

	Player	Team	GP	TOI	W	L	SA	GA	SO	SV%	GA60
1	Minja Drufva	K-Espoo	6	317:15	4	2	108	5	3	.956	0.95
2	Anni Keisala	Ilves	14	849:58	8	4	450	27	2	.943	1.91
3	Tiina Ranne	KalPa	9	543:33	7	1	226	16	2	.934	1.77
4	Salla Sivula	HPK	8	480:59	5	3	245	18	0	.932	2.25
5	Aino Laitinen	Kuortane	10	568:11	5	4	368	29	1	.927	3.06
6	Susanna Airaksinen	KalPa	7	420:00	5	2	172	14	2	.925	2.00
7	Emilia Kyrkkö	Kuortane	8	450:49	2	6	271	23	1	.922	3.06
8	Olivia Last	RoKi	8	408:24	4	4	253	22	0	.920	3.23
9	Iina Kuusela	HIFK	10	608:46	7	3	302	27	1	.918	2.66
10	Johanna Oksman	Kärpät	12	721:12	4	8	355	32	1	.917	2.66
10	Meeri Räisänen	HPK	8	484:45	3	4	244	22	0	.917	2.72

== Regular season ==
The ten-game Naisten Liiga regular season, also called the upper division series (Finnish: ylempi jatkosarja), is played by the six top-ranked teams from the preliminary series.

Following the December stoppage, play resumed on 8 January 2021. The decision was made to begin the regular season (upper and lower divisional series) rather than attempt to makeup the games missed during the pause, resulting in teams with seventeen to nineteen games played at the conclusion of the preliminaries. As the league had already adopted the use of points per game for league rankings, the impact of dropping the missed games on the remainder of the season was negligible.

=== Standings ===
Pos	Team	Pld	W	OTW	OTL	L	GF	GA	GD	Pts	Postseason placement
1	Kiekko-Espoo	27	21	1	0	5	124	46	+78	65	Playoff quarterfinals
2	KalPa	25	18	1	0	6	121	51	+70	56	Playoff quarterfinals
3	HIFK	27	16	4	1	6	104	59	+45	57	Playoff quarterfinals
4	Ilves	28	12	3	5	8	83	66	+17	47	Playoff quarterfinals
5	HPK	29	13	2	3	11	85	78	+7	46	Playoff quarterfinals
6	TPS	27	11	2	2	12	91	97	−6	39	Playoff quarterfinals

Updated to match(es) played on 27 February 2021. Source: Suomen Jääkiekkoliitto

Official ranking

Pos	Team	PpG
1	K-Espoo	2.41
2	KalPa	2.24
3	HIFK	2.11
4	Ilves	1.68
5	HPK	1.59
6	TPS	1.44

=== Statistics ===
Scoring leaders

The following players led the league in points at the conclusion of the regular season on 28 February 2021.

	Player	Team	GP	G	A	Pts	PIM
1	Michaela Pejzlová	HIFK	8	7	6	13	0
2	Johanna Juutilainen	KalPa	7	3	10	13	0
3	Matilda Nilsson	KalPa	7	8	4	12	4
4	Emilia Vesa	K-Espoo	8	7	4	11	2
5	Karoliina Rantamäki	HIFK	8	3	8	11	0
6	Elisa Holopainen	KalPa	7	7	3	10	6
7	Emilia Varpula	Ilves	9	3	6	9	0
8	Jenna Suokko	Ilves	9	5	3	8	8
9	Kiti Seikkula	HPK	7	4	4	8	2
10	Helen Puputti	Ilves	9	5	2	7	8
11	Tinja-Mariia Haukijärvi	K-Espoo	9	4	3	7	2

Leading goaltenders

The following goaltenders lead the league in save percentage at the conclusion of the regular season on 27 February 2021, while starting at least one third of matches.

	Player	Team	GP	TOI	W	L	SA	GA	SO	SV%	GA60
1	Tiina Ranne	KalPa	5	296:40	3	2	156	10	1	.940	2.02
2	Anni Keisala	Ilves	8	485:54	3	3	293	19	0	.939	2.35
3	Meeri Räisänen	HPK	5	304:20	1	3	218	16	0	.932	3.15
4	Iina Kuusela	HIFK	5	298:34	3	2	133	10	1	.930	2.01
5	Salla Sivula	HPK	5	304:12	2	2	168	13	0	.928	2.56
6	Isabella Laiho	TPS	6	337:01	0	3	190	19	0	.909	3.38
7	Tiia Pajarinen	K-Espoo	8	440:30	5	1	151	16	1	.904	2.18
8	Neea Pohjamo	TPS	5	205:30	1	4	104	23	0	.819	6.72

== Lower division series ==
The lower division series (Finnish: Alempi jatkosarja) was modified to be played by the five lowest-ranked teams from the preliminary series, rather than the standard four, and the top team from the cross-qualifiers (Finnish: Ristiinkarsinta) of the Naisten Mestis, rather than the top-two from the cross-qualifiers, to account for the additional Naisten Liiga team. The series was originally scheduled to be played during 16 January to 21 February 2021 but was ultimately played during 9 January to 28 February 2021.

=== Standings ===
Pos	Team	Pld	W	OTW	OTL	L	GF	GA	GD	Pts	Postseason placement
1	Kärpät	10	8	0	0	2	47	12	+35	24	Playoff quarterfinals
2	Team Kuortane	10	7	1	0	2	33	17	+16	23	Playoff quarterfinals
3	RoKi	10	7	0	1	2	31	21	+10	22	Qualifiers
4	Lukko	10	3	0	0	7	21	37	−16	9	Qualifiers
5	Sport	10	2	1	0	7	28	44	−16	8	Qualifiers
6	JYP	10	1	0	1	8	23	52	−29	4	Qualifiers

Updated to match(es) played on 28 February 2021. Source: Suomen Jääkiekkoliitto

Official ranking

Pos	Team	PpG
1	Kärpät	2.40
2	Kuortane	2.30
3	RoKi	2.20
4	Lukko	0.90
5	Sport	0.80
6	JYP	0.40

=== Statistics ===
Scoring leaders

The following players led the lower division in points at the conclusion of the series on 28 February 2021.

	Player	Team	GP	G	A	Pts	PIM
1	Jenna Kaila	Kuortane	10	8	8	16	2
2	Susanna Viitala	Sport	10	9	6	15	2
3	Sofianna Sundelin	Kuortane	10	6	9	15	4
4	Tilli Keränen	Kärpät	7	7	6	13	0
5	Jenna Pirttijärvi	RoKi	10	5	8	13	2
6	Kiira Yrjänen	Kuortane	9	9	3	12	14
7	Suvi Käyhkö	Kärpät	10	4	8	12	0
8	Anna-Kaisa Antti-Roiko	Kärpät	9	4	7	11	8
9	Paulina Suoniemi	Sport	10	4	7	11	4
10	Jonna Yli-Mäenpää	Kärpät	10	3	8	11	4
11	Maija Koski	Lukko	10	7	3	10	0

Leading goaltenders

The following goaltenders lead the lower division in save percentage at the conclusion of the series on 28 February 2021, while starting at least one third of matches.

	Player	Team	GP	TOI	W	L	SA	GA	SO	SV%	GA60
1	Johanna Oksman	Kärpät	6	357:22	5	1	132	5	3	.964	0.84
2	Emilia Kyrkkö	Kuortane	5	298:33	3	1	151	8	0	.950	1.61
3	Aino Laitinen	Kuortane	4	237:05	3	1	94	6	1	.940	1.52
4	Janita Haapasaari	RoKi	9	527:10	6	3	248	18	1	.932	2.05
5	Kati Asikainen	Kärpät	4	239:22	3	1	71	7	1	.910	1.75
6	Johanna Niemi	Lukko	7	378:10	2	5	203	22	0	.902	3.49
7	Katrina Saarenmaa	Lukko	4	220:00	1	2	127	14	0	.901	3.82
8	Juuli Kivimäki	JYP	6	320:33	1	5	211	25	0	.894	4.68
9	Noora Tonteri	JYP	4	236:09	0	4	160	21	0	.884	5.34
10	Melisa Mörönen	Sport	9	536:16	3	6	269	39	1	.873	4.36

== Playoffs ==
International travel restrictions and quarantine protocols due to the COVID-19 pandemic necessitated extended travel schedules for national teams competing in the 2021 IIHF Women's World Championship, originally scheduled to begin on 4 April 2021, and the Naisten Liiga playoff structure was modified to conclude a week earlier than expected to accommodate a training camp within the quarantine period for the Finnish national team. On 27 February, it was announced that, in order to name the Finnish Champion by 27 March at the latest, the quarterfinal series were to be reduced from the standard best-of-five system to best-of-three. The best-of-five semifinals and finals and the bronze medal match remain unchanged.

In an unexpected twist, on 4 March the International Ice Hockey Federation (IIHF) announced that the 2021 Women's Worlds were to be postponed until 6–16 May 2021. As the first games of the Naisten Liiga quarterfinals had already been played the day before, the playoff structure announced on 27 February remained in place following announcement of the postponement.

Quarterfinals
1	Kiekko-Espoo	2
8	Team Kuortane	0
4	Ilves Tampere	2
5	HPK Hämeenlinna	0
2	KalPa Kuopio	2
7	Kärpät Oulu	0
3	HIFK Helsinki	2
6	TPS Turku	0

Semifinals
1	Kiekko-Espoo	3
4	Ilves Tampere	1
2	KalPa Kuopio	3
3	HIFK Helsinki	2

Finals
1st place, gold medalist(s)	Kiekko-Espoo	3
2nd place, silver medalist(s)	KalPa Kuopio	1
Bronze medal game
3rd place, bronze medalist(s)	HIFK Helsinki	2
4	Ilves Tampere	1

== Qualification series ==
Two teams from the 2020 qualification series, RoKi and Lukko, returned to the relegation tournament in 2021, joined by Vaasan Sport, the eighth seed of the 2020 playoffs, and JYP, the team promoted mid-season to the lower division series.

After amassing 22 points and a 2.20 points average in the lower division series, RoKi needed just one three-point (regulation) victory in the qualification series to amass an unbeatable point advantage and retain their place in the Naisten Liiga. They earned the necessary three points in the first match of the series, against JYP. Skaters Moona Keskisarja and Jenna Pirttijärvi both ranked in the top ten of the series for point totals and their goaltender with the best save percentage was Olivia Last, at .910, and best goals against average was Janita Haapasaari, with 2.50.

JYP had very little hope of qualifying for the 2021–22 Naisten Liiga season, after concluding the lower division series with just four points in ten games. Over the six games of the qualification series, they were able to collect points only in one overtime victory and two overtime losses and were conclusively relegated to the Naisten Mestis. Their top point scorer was Anna Vanhala, one of four remaining players from 2015–16 JYP roster that won the Finnish Championship, and their best goaltender was Juuli Kivimäki.

The second qualifying position was hotly contested by Lukko and Sport, as the teams came out of the lower division series with only one point separating them.

=== Standings ===
Pos	Team	Pld	W	OTW	OTL	L	GF	GA	GD	Pts	Postseason placement
1	RoKi	16	9	1	2	4	55	42	+13	31	Qualify for Naisten Liiga
2	Sport	16	7	2	0	7	53	59	−6	25	Qualify for Naisten Liiga
3	Lukko	16	3	2	2	9	40	60	−20	15	Relegated to Naisten Mestis
4	JYP	16	1	1	3	11	38	76	−38	8	Relegated to Naisten Mestis

Updated to match(es) played on 21 March 2021. Source: Suomen Jääkiekkoliitto

Official ranking

Pos	Team	Pld	Pts	PpG
1	RoKi	16	31	1.94
2	Sport	16	25	1.56
3	Lukko	16	15	0.94
4	JYP	16	8	0.50

=== Results ===
6 March 2021; 12:15	RoKi Rovaniemi	5–1 (0-1, 3-0, 2-0)	JYP Jyväskylä	Lappi Areena, Rovaniemi

Game reference

Janita Haapasaari
Goalies
Juuli Kivimäki
Referee:
Eemi Kaarlela
Linesmen:
Kalle Tuovila
Sami Kylmäluoma

	0-1	07:22 – PP – Nurmi (Holmström, Vanhala)
Ad. Makkonen (Parviainen, Pekkala) – PP – 25:31	1-1
Pirttijärvi (Lahtela) – PP – 32:09	2-1
Lahtela (Pekkala) – PP – 38:39	3-1
Ad. Makkonen (Keskisarja) – 40:52	4-1
Hietala (Kontiosalo) – 52:09	5-1

4 min
Penalties
22 min
55
Shots
20

6 March 2021; 16:00	Sport Vaasa	5–4 OT (1-2, 2-2, 1-0, 1-0)	Lukko Rauma	Vaasa harjoitusjäähalli 2, Vaasa

Game reference

Melisa Mörönen
Goalies
Johanna Niemi
Referee:
Tero Peltomaa
Linesmen:
Sebastian Rosenqvist
Konsta Mäenpänen

	0-1	07:21 – Harjula (Toivonen, Koski)
Storbjörk (Fagerudd, Kupari) – 10:40	1-1
	1-2	19:59 – Toivonen (Harjula, RM. Leino)
Viitala (Hagnäs) – 23:14	2-2
Hagnäs (Kuusisto) – 24:16	3-2
	3-3	33:49 – Toivonen (Harjula, Koski)
	3-4	37:54 – Harjula (Toivonen, RM. Leino)
Viitala (Hänninen) – PP, NG – 59:33	4-4
Hagnäs (Suoniemi, Viitala) – PP – 61:28	5-4

8 min
Penalties
12 min
55
Shots
20

7 March 2021; 16:15	Lukko Rauma	2–1 SO (1-0, 0-1, 0-0, 0-0, 1-0)	JYP Jyväskylä	Äijänsuon jäähalli II, Rauma

Game reference
Johanna Niemi	Goalies	Juuli Kivimäki	Referee: Niko Rautavuori; Linesmen: Verneri Jalonen; Kaapo Elomaa
Lindroth (Särkinen, Karru) – PP – 29:25 / 1-0; / 1-1 / 36:39 – Vanhala			Referee: Niko Rautavuori; Linesmen: Verneri Jalonen; Kaapo Elomaa
GOAL MISS	Shootout	MISS GOAL	Referee: Niko Rautavuori; Linesmen: Verneri Jalonen; Kaapo Elomaa
Shootout goals scored in progression by: Mette Karru (LUK), Essi Reittu (JYP), Anna Kahlhammer (LUK)			Referee: Niko Rautavuori; Linesmen: Verneri Jalonen; Kaapo Elomaa
4 min	Penalties	4 min	Referee: Niko Rautavuori; Linesmen: Verneri Jalonen; Kaapo Elomaa
27	Shots	32	Referee: Niko Rautavuori; Linesmen: Verneri Jalonen; Kaapo Elomaa

10 March 2021; 18:45	Sport Vaasa	2–1 (2-1, 0-0, 0-0)	RoKi Rovaniemi	Vaasa harjoitusjäähalli 2, Vaasa

Game reference

Melisa Mörönen
Goalies
Olivia Last
Referee:
Henry Hietaharju
Linesmen:
Kasper Kalpamaa
Väinö Hautajärvi

	0-1	04:31 – Pirttijärvi (Keskisarja, Mourujärvi)
Viitala (Suoniemi, Hänninen) – PP – 10:30	1-1
Hagnäs (Mylläri, Viitala) – 14:51	2-1

8 min
Penalties
6 min
42
Shots
37

11 March 2021; 17:45	Lukko Rauma	5–4 SO (1-0, 0-3, 3-1, 0-0, 1-0)	RoKi Rovaniemi	Äijänsuon jäähalli II, Rauma

Game reference

Johanna Niemi
Goalies
Janika Järvikari
Referee:
Niko Rautavuori
Linesmen:
Verneri Jalonen
Jussi Hirsimäki

Toivonen (Harjula, Koski) – 10:44	1-0
	1-1	23:47 – Lahtela (Kumpula
	1-2	31:49 – Siivonen (Mourujärvi, Karjalainen)
	1-3	33:08 – Lahtela (Jaako, Kontiosalo)
Koskinen (Hyytiä, Lindroth) – 41:48	2-3
Harjula (Koski, Kytömaa) – 46:08	3-3
	3-4	47:55 – PP – Kontiosalo (Jaako, Heinonen)
Koskinen (Hyytiä, Kaukola) – 57:16	4-4

Shootout

Shootout goals scored in progression by: Anna Kahlhammer (LUK), Ella Lahtela (ROK), Mette Karru (LUK)
6 min
Penalties
4 min
28
Shots
26

12 March 2021; 16:30	JYP Jyväskylä	4–5 OT (0-2, 2-0, 2-2, 0-1)	RoKi Rovaniemi	Harjoitusjäähalli 2, Jyväskylä

Game reference

Juuli Kivimäki
Goalies
Janita Haapasaari
Referee:
Sini Kauhanen
Linesmen:
Arttu Rytkönen
Aino Härkönen

	0-1	00:14 – Keskisarja (Pirttijärvi)
	0-2	13:45 – Jaako (Kontiosalo)
Vanhala – SH – 22:26	1-2
Reittu (Nurmi, Yliniva) – PP – 37:35	2-2
	2-3	42:01 – Keskisarja (Heinonen, Mourujärvi)
Kylmäaho (Pohjala, Nurmi) – 51:35	3-3
Holmström – 52:03	4-3
	4-4	59:47 – NG – Pirttijärvi (Jaako)
	4-5	62:16 – Pirttijärvi (Keskisarja)

29 min
Penalties
16 min
22
Shots
33

13 March 2021; 14:15	JYP Jyväskylä	1–4 (0-1, 0-3, 1-0)	Sport Vaasa	Harjoitusjäähalli 2, Jyväskylä

Game reference

Noora Tonteri
Goalies
Melisa Mörönen
Referee:
Joel Hytönen
Linesmen:
Jere Virtanen
Kasperi Toikkanen

	0-1	19:26 – Viitala (Hagnäs, Mylläri)
	0-2	36:36 – Hagnäs (Suoniemi, Viitala)
	0-3	38:17 – Viitala (Qvarfordt)
	0-4	39:50 – Qvarfordt (Kuusisto)
Vanhala (Kaliomäki) – PP – 54:53	1-4

6 min
Penalties
6 min
17
Shots
38

14 March 2021; 17:30	Lukko Rauma	1–4 (1-2, 0-1, 0-1)	Sport Vaasa	Äijänsuon jäähalli II, Rauma

Game reference

Johanna Niemi
Goalies
Melisa Mörönen
Referee:
Joona Koivu
Linesmen:
Verneri Jalonen
Jussi Hirsimäki

	0-1	10:05 – Storbjörk (Lehtimäki, Fagerudd)
Karru (Laamanen, Särkinen) – PP – 13:46	1-1
	1-2	15:20 – Mylläri (Suoniemi, Hagnäs)
	1-3	33:06 – Kuusisto (Qvarfordt, Hautamäki)
	1-4	51:27 – Viitala (Kuusisto, Mylläri)

8 min
Penalties
8 min
25
Shots
39

20 March 2021; 12:15	RoKi Rovaniemi	6–5 (1-0, 2-4, 3-1)	Lukko Rauma	Lappi Areena, Rovaniemi

Game reference

Olivia Last
Goalies
Johanna Niemi
Referee:
Sami Kylmäluoma
Linesmen:
Kalle Tuovila
Atte Mathlin

Hietala – 08:33	1-0
	1-1	22:56 – Koski (Toivonen, Harjula)
	1-2	29:10 – Särkinen (Koski)
Parviainen – 34:45	2-2
	2-3	38:53 – PP – Karru (Kaukola)
	2-4	39:26 – PP – Harjula (Koski, Karru)
Pirttijärvi (Keskisarja, Pekkala) – 39:34	3-4
Pirttijärvi (Heikonen, Mourujärvi) – 40:30	4-4
Makkonen (Hietala, Parviainen) – PP – 42:44	5-4
Hietala (Kontiosalo) – EN – 59:08	6-4
	6-5	59:56 – Koski (Harjula, Toivonen)

8 min
Penalties
14 min
38
Shots
29

20 March 2021; 12:45	Sport Vaasa	6–5 (2-1, 1-1, 3-3)	JYP Jyväskylä	Vaasa harjoitusjäähalli 2, Vaasa

Game reference

Melisa Mörönen
Goalies
Riina Hirvonen
Referee:
Valtteri Autio
Linesmen:
Teemu Saari
Väinö Hautajärvi

Suoniemi (Mylläri) – 03:48	1-0
	1-1	11:31 – PP – Vanhala (Pohjala, Reittu)
Mylläri (Kuusisto, Hautamäki) – 13:33	2-1
Mylläri (Viitala, Hänninen) – PP – 27:06	3-1
	3-2	39:12 – Vanhala (Yliniva, Pohjala)
	3-3	42:52 – Holmström
Hänninen (Viitala) – PP – 49:30	4-3
Viitala (Suoniemi, Hagnäs) – 50:58	5-3
Fagerudd (Storbjörk, Lehtimäki) – 51:47	6-3
	6-4	57:49 – NG – Nikkilä (Holmström, Repo)
	6-5	59:19 – NG – Rauhamaa (Pölkki, Nikkilä)

12 min
Penalties
8 min
34
Shots
40

21 March 2021; 12:15	RoKi Rovaniemi	3–4 (2-1, 0-1, 1-2)	Sport Vaasa	Lappi Areena, Rovaniemi

Game reference

Janika Järvikari
Goalies
Oona Mäki
Referee:
Antti Jokelainen
Linesmen:
Atte Mathlin
Kalle Tuovila

Keskisarja (Ad. Makkonen) – 08:23	1-0
Ad. Makkonen (Kontiosalo, Lahtela) – PP – 13:20	2-0
	2-1	15:18 – Qvarfordt (Suoniemi)
	2-2	30:51 – Viitala (Suoniemi)
	2-3	41:52 – Myllyniemi (Suoniemi, Qvarfordt)
Ad. Makkonen (Lahtela, Keskisarja) – 42:43	3-3
	3-4	52:55 – Mylläri (Viitala, Suoniemi)

2 min
Penalties
6 min
31
Shots
30

21 March 2021; 16:45	JYP Jyväskylä	3–2 SO (1-2, 1-0, 0-0, 0-0, 1-0)	Lukko Rauma	Harjoitusjäähalli 2, Jyväskylä

Game reference

Juuli Kivimäki
Goalies
Katriina Saarenmaa,
Noora Tonteri
Referee:
Joel Hytönen
Linesmen:
Kasperi Toikkanen
Ville-Valtteri Virtanen

	0-1	02:53 – Särkinen (Leino)
Huuskonen (Nikkilä) – 05:20	1-1
	1-2	12:04 – PP – Koski (Kaukola, Harjula)
Vanhala (Reittu) – 21:33	2-2

Shootout

Shootout goals scored in progression by: Mette Karru (LUK), Sanni Nikkilä (JYP), Veera Pohjala (JYP)
6 min
Penalties
4 min
35
Shots
41

=== Statistics ===
Scoring leaders

The following players led scoring in the qualification series at the conclusion of the series on 21 March 2021.

	Player	Team	GP	G	A	Pts	PIM
1	Susanna Viitala	Sport	6	8	6	14	2
2	Ella Harjula	Lukko	6	4	6	10	2
3	Paulina Suoniemi	Sport	6	1	9	10	2
4	Maija Koski	Lukko	6	3	6	9	0
5	Noora Mylläri	Sport	6	4	4	8	2
5	Julia Hagnäs	Sport	6	4	4	8	6
7	Moona Keskisarja	RoKi	6	3	5	8	0
8	Anna Vanhala	JYP	6	6	1	7	0
8	Jenna Pirttijärvi	RoKi	6	6	1	7	18
10	Aliisa Toivonen	Lukko	6	3	4	7	0

Leading goaltenders

The following goaltenders played at least one match in the qualification series, sorted by save percentage.

	Player	Team	GP	TOI	W	L	SA	GA	SO	SV%	GA60
1	Katrina Saarenmaa	Lukko	1	65:00	0	0	35	2	0	.946	1.85
2	Melisa Mörönen	Sport	5	300:31	5	0	145	12	0	.924	2.40
3	Juuli Kivimäki	JYP	4	252:16	0	2	156	13	0	.923	3.09
4	Oona Mäki	Sport	1	60:00	1	0	31	3	0	.912	3.00
5	Olivia Last	RoKi	2	119:40	1	1	71	7	0	.910	3.51
6	Noora Tonteri	JYP	1	57:20	0	1	38	4	0	.905	4.19
7	Johanna Niemi	Lukko	5	310:04	0	3	175	19	0	.902	3.68
8	Janita Haapasaari	RoKi	2	120:06	2	0	42	5	0	.894	2.50
9	Janika Järvikari	RoKi	2	123:29	0	1	58	8	0	.879	3.89
10	Riina Hirvonen	JYP	1	57:24	0	1	34	6	0	.850	6.27

== Awards and honours ==
=== Finnish Ice Hockey Association awards ===
- Riikka Nieminen Award (Player of the Year): Elisa Holopainen, KalPa
- Tuula Puputti Award (Best goaltender): Anni Keisala, Ilves
- Päivi Halonen Award (Best defenceman): Nelli Laitinen, Kiekko-Espoo
- Katja Riipi Award (Best forward): Elisa Holopainen, KalPa
- Noora Räty Award (Rookie of the Year): Anna-Kaisa Antti-Roiko, Kärpät
- Marianne Ihalainen Award (Top point scorer): Michaela Pejzlová, HIFK
- Tiia Reima Award (Top goal scorer): Matilda Nilsson, KalPa
- Sari Fisk Award (Best plus/minus): Emilia Vesa, Kiekko-Espoo
- Emma Laaksonen Award (Fair-play player): Johanna Juutilainen, KalPa
- Student Athlete Award: Anni Hietaharju, HIFK
- U18 Student Athlete Award: Nea Tervonen, Kuortane
- Hannu Saintula Award (Coach of the Year): Saara Niemi, HIFK
- Karoliina Rantamäki Award (MVP of the Playoffs): Tiia Pajarinen, Kiekko-Espoo
- Anu Hirvonen Award (Best referee): Anniina Nurmi
- Johanna Suban Award (Best linesman): Tiina Saarimäki

Source: Finnish Ice Hockey Association, Jääkiekkokirja 2022

Czech forward Michaela Pejzlová of HIFK Naiset claimed the Marianne Ihalainen Award as regular season scoring champion, the first international player to ever win a league award. KalPa Naiset winger Matilda Nilsson was the top goalscorer of the regular season and became the second KalPa player to receive the Tiia Reima Award.

=== All-Star teams ===
All-Star Team

- Goaltender: Anni Keisala, Ilves
- Defenceman: Nelli Laitinen, Kiekko-Espoo
- Defenceman: Anna Kilponen, Ilves
- Winger: Elisa Holopainen, KalPa
- Center: Estelle Duvin, TPS
- Winger: Matilda Nilsson, KalPa

All-Star Team II

- Goaltender: Tiina Ranne, KalPa
- Defenceman: Athéna Locatelli, HIFK
- Defenceman: Krista Parkkonen, HIFK
- Winger: Emilia Vesa, Kiekko-Espoo
- Center: Michaela Pejzlová, HIFK
- Winger: Jenna Suokko, Ilves

Source: Finnish Ice Hockey Association, Jääkiekkokirja 2022

=== Player of the Month ===
- September 2020: Elisa Holopainen (F), KalPa Kuopio
- October 2020: Nelli Laitinen (D), Kiekko-Espoo
- November 2020: Estelle Duvin (F), TPS Turku
- December 2020: not awarded (no games played)
- January 2021: Anni Keisala (G), Ilves Tampere
- February 2021: Emilia Vesa (F), Kiekko-Espoo

== Milestones ==
- On 19 September 2020, HPK forward and captain Riikka Noronen played her 600th game in the Naisten Liiga, becoming the first player in league history to reach the milestone.
- On 17 January 2021, Ilves forward Emilia Varpula and KalPa defenceman Eveliina Nurmi played their 200th games in the Naisten Liiga.
