= 2021–22 Naisten Liiga season =

39th ice hockey season of the Naisten Liiga

- League: Naisten Liiga
- Sport: Ice hockey
- Duration: 11 September 2021 – 20 March 2022; Playoffs; 26 March–24 April 2022
- Games: 30
- Teams: 10 in Preliminaries; 6 in Regular season, 6 in Lower division series
- TV partner: Leijonat.fi

Regular Season
- Season champions: Kiekko-Espoo
- Runners-up: HIFK Helsinki
- Top scorer: Estelle Duvin (TPS)
- Promoted to Lower division series: Alavuden Peli-Veikot; Rauman Lukko
- Relegated to 2022–23 Naisten Mestis: Alavuden Peli-Veikot; Vaasan Sport

Playoffs
- Playoffs MVP: Nelli Laitinen (K-Espoo)
- Finals champions: Kiekko-Espoo (16)
- Runners-up: HIFK Helsinki

Naisten Liiga seasons
- 2020–21 2022–23

The 2021–22 Naisten Liiga season was the thirty-ninth season of the Naisten Liiga, the premier level of women's ice hockey in Finland, since the league's establishment as the Naisten SM-sarja in 1982. The season began on 11 September 2021 and concluded on 20 March 2022.

== League business ==
=== Offseason ===
==== HPK Kiekkonaiset team transfer ====
In June 2021, it was announced that the HPK Kiekkonaiset team would be transferred to HPK Liiga Oy, owner of the Liiga team HPK and the U20 SM-sarja team HPK U20. HPK Kiekkonaiset had previously been a part of the HPK-affiliated junior club HPK Edustusjääkiekko Ry, a non-profit association. According to Antti Toivanen, CEO of HPK Liiga Oy and general manager of the HPK men's team, the move was motivated by an interest in capitalizing on the growing women's ice hockey market, which was highlighted by the record crowds that attended the 2019 IIHF Women's World Championship in Espoo. Jorma Hassinen, general manager of HPK Kiekkonaiset, expressed hope that the transfer would allow female players to develop with the same opportunities as their male counterparts.

==== Financial support for RoKi players ====
Rovaniemen Kiekko ry announced it would begin supporting RoKi Naiset ice hockey players selected to women's national team camps and evaluation tournaments with grants of several hundred to a thousand euros. RoKi Naiset head coach Tuomas Liitola stated the club's long-term goal is to reduce the cost of playing with RoKi Naiset to zero.

=== Coaching changes ===
Team	2019–20	2020–21	Details
Off–season
HPK Kiekkonaiset	Mari Saarinen	Harri Nummela	Appointed in May 2021, Nummela is the fourth HPK head coach in as many seasons. He has previously served as head coach of men's teams in the Suomi-sarja and 2. Divisioona.
Oulun Kärpät Naiset	Janne Salmela	Samuli Hassi	Hassi was appointed as the new Kärpät head coach in April 2021, replacing Salmela after two seasons at the helm. The 27 year old, originally from Oulu, spent the previous four seasons studying in Rovaniemi and coaching in the junior organization of Rovaniemen Kiekko (RoKi). He served as the head coach of RoKi U18 in the 2020–21 season of the men's U18 Mestis.
TPS Naiset	~~Matti Tähkäpää~~, Kai Ortio	Terhi Mertanen	Ortio was promoted from assistant coach to head coach after Tähkäpää's contract was terminated with five games remaining in the 2020–21 regular season. Mertanen was named the 2021–22 head coach shortly thereafter, in March 2021. An Olympic medalist with the Finnish national team at the 2010 Winter Olympics, Mertanen spent the previous two seasons as an assistant coach of RoKi Naiset.

=== Player signings of note ===
Note: The following tables do not include all player movements made during the Naisten Liiga season but rather feature moves involving national team players or international players, extra-league moves, and player movements determined to be otherwise notable.

Preseason

Player	Previous team	2021–22 team	ref.
Incoming players
Nicole Andenmatten	Neuchâtel HA (SWHL A)	HPK	
Samantha Benoit	Norwich Cadets (NCAA D3)	HPK	
Megan Delay	Buffalo Beauts (PHF)	HPK	
Paula Mandlíková	ŽHK Zvolen (Slovakia)	RoKi	
Alena Mills	KRS Vanke Rays (ZhHL)	HPK	
Noora Räty	KRS Vanke Rays (ZhHL)	HPK	
Minttu Tuominen	KRS Vanke Rays (ZhHL)	Kiekko-Espoo	
Lucie Velinská	HC 2001 Kladno	RoKi	
Intra-league transfers
Elisa Holopainen	KalPa	Kiekko-Espoo	
Julia Liikala	HPK	HIFK	
Matilda Nilsson	KalPa	HIFK	
Sanni Rantala	Team Kuortane	Kiekko-Espoo	
Kiira Yrjänen	Team Kuortane	Kiekko-Espoo	
Departing players
Julia Hagnäs	Vaasan Sport	Färjestad BK (Damettan)	
Aino Laitinen	Team Kuortane	Budapest JA (EWHL)	
Meeri Räisänen	HPK	JYP U20 Akatemia (U20 Mestis)	
Jenna Suokko	Tampereen Ilves	Buffalo Beauts (PHF)	

Preliminaries

Player	Initial 2021–22 team	Joining 2021–22 team	ref.
Incoming players
Lívia Kúbeková	ŠKP Bratislava (EWHL)	HPK	
Lucia Ištocyová	ŠKP Bratislava (EWHL)	HPK	
Departing players
Aino Karppinen	RoKi	Luleå HF/MSSK (L) (SDHL)	
Jenna Pirttijärvi	RoKi	Luleå HF/MSSK (SDHL)	

Divisional series

Player	Initial 2021–22 team	Joining 2021–22 team	ref.
Incoming players
Júlia Matejková	ŠKP Bratislava (EWHL)	HPK	
Linnea Melotindos	St. Cloud State Huskies (NCAA D1)	Ilves	
Kassidy Sauvé	Toronto (PWHPA)	HPK	
Sofia Vysokajová	ŠKP Bratislava (EWHL)	HPK	
Departing players
Nicole Andenmatten	HPK	Neuchâtel HA (SWHL A)	
Anna Kilponen	Ilves	KRS Vanke Rays (ZhHL)	
Lívia Kúbeková	HPK	ŠKP Bratislava (EWHL)	
Lucia Ištocyová	HPK	ŠKP Bratislava (EWHL)	
Paula Mandlíková	RoKi	HK Nové Zámky U16 (Slovakia U16)	
Noora Räty	HPK	KRS Vanke Rays (ZhHL)	
Minttu Tuominen	Kiekko-Espoo	KRS Vanke Rays (ZhHL)	

== Teams ==
Location of teams in the Naisten Liiga
: Upper division;: Lower division

Team	Location	Home venue	Head coach	Captain
HIFK Naiset or Stadin Gimmat	Helsinki	Pirkkolan jäähalli	Saara Niemi	Karoliina Rantamäki
HPK Kiekkonaiset	Hämeenlinna	Jääliikuntakeskus Hakio	Harri Nummela	Heta Seikkula
Ilves Naiset	Tampere	Tesoman jäähalli	Linda Leppänen	Anna Kilponen
KalPa Naiset	Kuopio	Niiralan Monttu	Marjo Voutilainen	Johanna Juutilainen
Kiekko-Espoo Naiset	Espoo	Tapiolan harjoitusareena	Sami Haapanen	Minttu Tuominen
Kärpät Naiset	Oulu	Raksilan jäähalli	Samuli Hassi	Suvi Käyhkö
RoKi Naiset	Rovaniemi	Lappi Areena	Tuomas Liitola	Emmi Mourujärvi
Sport Naiset	Vaasa	Vaasan Sähkö Arena	Susanne Uppgård	Pauliina Suoniemi
Team Kuortane	Kuortane	Kuortaneen jäähalli	Mira Kuisma	Nea Tervonen
TPS Naiset	Turku	Kupittaan jäähalli	Terhi Mertanen	Elina Heikkinen
Team promoted from the Naisten Mestis to the lower division
APV Naiset	Alavus	Alavus Areena	Noora Mäkiranta	Pinja Niemistö
Lukko Naiset	Rauma	Westinghouse Areena	Sami Piilikangas	Maija Koski

== Preliminary series ==
The preliminary series began on 11 September and concluded on 12 December 2021. The Finnish Ice Hockey Association opted to use the points per game ranking system first implemented in the 2020–21 season to allow for the potential of cancelled matches due to the COVID-19 pandemic. Some games in the preliminary series were rescheduled, however, each team was able to play all twenty matches.

The top six ranked teams in the preliminaries advanced to the regular season, also called the upper division series (Finnish: Ylempi jatkosarja) and were guaranteed playoff berths.

=== Standings ===
Pos	Team	Pld	W	OTW	OTL	L	GF	GA	GD	Pts	Final Result
1	Kiekko-Espoo	20	20	0	0	0	137	25	+112	60	Advanced to Upper division
2	HIFK	20	17	0	0	3	100	31	+69	51	Advanced to Upper division
3	Oulun Kärpät	20	13	1	0	6	67	38	+29	41	Advanced to Upper division
4	Tampereen Ilves	20	9	2	2	7	59	42	+17	33	Advanced to Upper division
5	Team Kuortane	20	9	1	2	8	65	72	−7	31	Advanced to Upper division
6	TPS	20	7	3	1	9	72	68	+4	28	Advanced to Upper division
7	HPK	20	7	2	1	10	47	68	−21	26	Proceeded to Lower division
8	RoKi	20	6	0	2	12	43	83	−40	20	Proceeded to Lower division
9	KalPa	20	2	1	2	15	36	78	−42	10	Proceeded to Lower division
10	Vaasan Sport	20	0	0	0	20	27	148	−121	0	Proceeded to Lower division

Updated to match(es) played on 12 December 2021. Source: Leijonat

Official ranking

Teams were officially ranked by average points per game with ties broken by greater number of games played, followed by best goal difference, then greater number of goals.

Pos	Team	PpG
1	K-Espoo	3.00
2	HIFK	2.55
3	Kärpät	2.05
4	Ilves	1.65
5	Kuortane	1.55
6	TPS	1.40

Pos	Team	PpG
7	HPK	1.30
8	RoKi	1.00
9	KalPa	0.50
10	Sport	0.00

=== Schedule ===
Preliminaries
Date	Home	Score	Visitor	OT	Atn	Notes
11 September	Ilves	0–2	HIFK		110	Shutout recorded by Iina Kuusela (1)
11 September	HPK	4–7	TPS		70	
11 September	Kuortane	1–6	Kärpät		35	
11 September	K-Espoo	8–1	KalPa		88	
11 September	RoKi	8–1	Sport		102	
12 September	RoKi	5–2	Sport		89	
12 September	TPS	2–1	Ilves	SO	80	
12 September	KalPa	1–2	HPK	OT	112	
18 September	K-Espoo	8–0	HPK		58	Shutout recorded by Tiia Pajarinen (1)
19 September	Kärpät	2–1	Ilves		98	
19 September	KalPa	0–5	K-Espoo		107	Shutout recorded by Minja Drufva (1)
19 September	HPK	0–11	HIFK		50	Shutout recorded by Iina Kuusela (2)
19 September	Kuortane	5–3	TPS		55	
25 September	RoKi	2–3	Kärpät		116	
25 September	TPS	2–3	Ilves		30	
25 September	HIFK	4–1	KalPa		90	
25 September	K-Espoo	9–1	Sport		56	
26 September	Ilves	3–0	TPS		50	
26 September	HIFK	9–2	Sport		62	
26 September	Kuortane	6–5	HPK		60	
26 September	K-Espoo	9–3	KalPa		62	
2 October	Kärpät	5–0	TPS		152	Shutout recorded by Johanna Oksman (1)
2 October	Ilves	2–1	HPK	SO	110	
2 October	RoKi	1–13	HIFK		60	
2 October	Sport	2–17	K-Espoo		50	Game with largest goal difference, ±15
3 October	Kärpät	0–4	HIFK		127	Shutout recorded by Iina Kuusela (3)
3 October	RoKi	5–6	TPS	SO	75	
3 October	KalPa	0–1	HPK		165	Shutout recorded by Noora Räty (1)
3 October	Kuortane	3–9	K-Espoo		70	
9 October	Kärpät	1–3	HPK		101	
9 October	RoKi	3–1	KalPa		82	
9 October	HIFK	4–0	Kuortane		82	Shutout recorded by Lumi Jääskeläinen (1)
10 October	Ilves	2–3	HIFK		90	
10 October	RoKi	0–4	HPK		84	Shutout recorded by Noora Räty (2)
10 October	TPS	8–0	Sport		45	Shutout recorded by Erica Jaskari (1)
10 October	K-Espoo	10–0	Kuortane		84	Shutout recorded by Tiia Pajarinen (2)
10 October	Kärpät	6–2	KalPa		105	
15 October	K-Espoo	2–0	HIFK		172	Shutout recorded by Tiia Pajarinen (3)
16 October	Sport	1–7	Ilves		45	
16 October	TPS	1–3	Kärpät		40	
16 October	HPK	1–2	RoKi		60	
16 October	Kuortane	5–1	KalPa		60	
17 October	Ilves	6–3	Kuortane		75	
17 October	HPK	2–1	Kärpät		70	
17 October	TPS	4–3	RoKi		65	
23 October	Ilves	1–3	Kärpät		60	
23 October	TPS	2–5	HIFK		60	
23 October	K-Espoo	8–1	RoKi		65	
24 October	HPK	1–7	Kuortane		60	
24 October	Ilves	1–5	K-Espoo		75	
24 October	HIFK	6–2	RoKi		85	
24 October	Sport	2–15	TPS		55	
24 October	KalPa	1–2	Kärpät	OT	59	
27 October	Kuortane	7–2	Sport		60	
30 October	KalPa	6–4	Sport		61	
30 October	HPK	0–2	Ilves		50	Shutout recorded by Anni Keisala (1)
30 October	Kuortane	3–5	HIFK		60	
30 October	Kärpät	6–0	RoKi		182	Shutout recorded by Kati Asikainen (1); highest attended game
30 October	K-Espoo	5–2	TPS		57	
31 October	Sport	2–10	HIFK		65	
31 October	KalPa	0–4	Ilves		87	Shutout recorded by Anni Keisala (2)
31 October	TPS	2–1	Kuortane	OT	40	
3 November	Sport	0–7	Kuortane		41	Shutout recorded by Hannele Tarkiainen (1)
5 November	HIFK	7–2	TPS		72	
6 November	Ilves	3–4	KalPa	OT	80	
6 November	RoKi	0–7	K-Espoo		51	Shutout recorded by Minja Drufva (1)
6 November	TPS	3–1	HPK		30	
7 November	Kärpät	1–6	K-Espoo		112	
7 November	Sport	1–4	KalPa		35	
7 November	RoKi	1–5	Ilves		68	
19 November	Sport	0–3	Kuortane		45	Shutout recorded by Hannele Tarkiainen (2)
20 November	Ilves	4–2	RoKi		68	
20 November	Sport	0–6	HPK		40	No shutout recorded
20 November	K-Espoo	5–2	Kärpät		42	
21 November	KalPa	1–2	RoKi		91	
21 November	HIFK	5–2	Kärpät		85	
21 November	Kuortane	3–4	Ilves	OT	50	
21 November	HPK	2–1	TPS	SO	80	
27 November	RoKi	1–2	Kuortane	OT	69	
27 November	HPK	4–2	KalPa		52	
27 November	Ilves	8–0	Sport		80	Shutout recorded by Salla Sivula (1)
27 November	HIFK	1–3	K-Espoo		117	
28 November	Kärpät	4–2	Kuortane		102	
28 November	HPK	5–3	Sport		50	
28 November	TPS	5–2	KalPa		55	
3 December	K-Espoo	5–1	Ilves		46	
3 December	HIFK	6–3	HPK		77	
4 December	Kärpät	6–1	Sport		86	
4 December	TPS	3–9	K-Espoo		35	
4 December	HIFK	3–1	Ilves		69	
5 December	KalPa	3–4	Kuortane		75	
5 December	Kärpät	4–0	RoKi		158	Shutout recorded by Kati Asikainen (2)
11 December	Sport	1–4	Kärpät		20	
11 December	KalPa	2–4	TPS		61	
11 December	HIFK	1–2	K-Espoo		102	
11 December	Kuortane	3–0	RoKi		40	Shutout recorded by Hannele Tarkiainen (3)
12 December	Sport	2–5	RoKi		20	
12 December	KalPa	1–2	HIFK		61	
12 December	HPK	2–5	K-Espoo		70	
12 December	Kuortane	0–6	Kärpät		40	Shutout recorded by Johanna Oksman (2)

=== Major events ===
- 26 September 2021 – Ilves 3–0 TPS, Tesoman jäähalli (Tampere)
  TPS forward Maija Otamo was issued a six-game ban – the longest suspension ever handed down to a player in the Naisten Liiga – after rendering Ilves forward Emilia Varpula unconscious with two hits in the head and neck area. The hits came with just nine seconds left on the clock and less than a minute after Varpula contributed an assist to Ilves' third and final goal in the eventual shutout. Varpula was taken directly from the ice to hospital by ambulance and was ultimately diagnosed with a concussion. Following the hits, a fight broke out between TPS forward Estelle Duvin and Ilves defenseman Elli Suoranta, resulting in one game suspensions for both players.

=== Player statistics ===
Scoring leaders

The following players led the league in points at the conclusion of games the preliminaries on 12 December 2021.

	Player	Team	GP	G	A	Pts	PIM
1	Elisa Holopainen	K-Espoo	19	19	23	42	2
2	Matilda Nilsson	HIFK	20	28	12	40	18
3	Estelle Duvin	TPS	17	23	16	39	49
4	Kiira Yrjänen	K-Espoo	20	20	15	35	6
5	Emmi Rakkolainen	K-Espoo	16	13	16	29	4
6	Sofianna Sundelin	Kuortane	17	14	13	27	8
7	Maija Otamo	TPS	14	11	16	27	33
8	Julia Liikala	HIFK	20	11	15	26	6
9	Tinja-Mariia Haukijärvi	K-Espoo	20	14	11	25	31
10	Oona Havana	Kärpät	20	13	12	25	6
11	Nea Tervonen	Kuortane	19	7	18	25	0

The following skaters were the top point scorers of teams not represented in the scoring leader table at the conclusion of the preliminary series, noted with their overall league scoring rank:

- 22. Johanna Juutilainen (F), KalPa: 18 GP, 6 G, 13 A, 19 Pts, 4 PIM
- 25. Jenna Heitala (F), RoKi: 19 GP, 11 G, 6 A, 17 Pts, 6 PIM
- 27. Susanna Viitala (F), Sport: 16 GP, 10 G, 6 A, 16 Pts, 2 PIM
- 49. Riikka Noronen (F), HPK: 19 GP, 2 G, 10 A, 12 Pts, 40 PIM

Elisa Holopainen was the leading point scorer in the preliminaries for the third consecutive season

Goaltenders

The following goaltenders lead the league in save percentage at the conclusion of the preliminary series on 12 December 2021, while starting at least one third of matches.

	Player	Team	GP	TOI	W	L	S	GA	SO	SV%	GAA
1	Noora Räty	HPK	14	822:47	7	5	493	24	2	.954	1.75
2	Iina Kuusela	HIFK	12	717:13	9	3	315	18	3	.946	1.51
3	Anni Keisala	Ilves	15	891:38	6	7	462	27	3	.945	1.82
4	Tiia Pajarinen	K-Espoo	12	680:00	12	0	231	14	3	.943	1.24
5	Kati Asikainen	Kärpät	11	660:06	8	3	301	19	2	.941	1.73
6	Johanna Oksman	Kärpät	9	537:17	6	3	261	17	2	.939	1.90
7	Minja Drufva	K-Espoo	8	460:00	7	0	129	9	1	.935	1.17
8	Janita Haapasaari	RoKi	10	559:41	4	5	351	33	0	.914	3.54
9	Erica Jaskari	TPS	12	726:44	4	6	367	37	1	.908	3.05
10	Janika Järvikari	RoKi	7	388:02	2	4	250	27	0	.903	4.17
11	Hannele Tarkiainen	Kuortane	10	546:15	6	4	234	26	3	.900	2.86

Vaasan Sport was the only team not represented in the top goaltenders table at the conclusion of the preliminary series. Sport's best goaltender was Oona Mäki, who played in thirteen games and recorded a .860 save percentage and 7.38 goals against average.

== Regular season ==
The Finnish Ice Hockey Association opted to use the points per game ranking system first implemented in the 2020–21 season to allow for the potential of cancelled matches due to the COVID-19 pandemic. The top six ranked teams from the preliminary series advanced to the regular season, also called the upper division series (Finnish: Ylempi jatkosarja), while teams ranked seventh through tenth progressed to the lower division series (Finnish: Alempi jatkosarja). The regular season began on 8 January 2022.

=== Standings ===
Pos	Team	Pld	W	OTW	OTL	L	GF	GA	GD	Pts	Final Result
1	Kiekko-Espoo	30	27	1	0	2	182	44	+138	83	Playoff quarterfinals
2	HIFK	29	26	0	0	3	137	41	+96	78	Playoff quarterfinals
3	Oulun Kärpät	29	16	2	0	11	85	62	+23	52	Playoff quarterfinals
4	Tampereen Ilves	30	12	2	3	13	78	72	+6	43	Playoff quarterfinals
5	TPS	29	10	3	2	14	101	108	−7	38	Playoff quarterfinals
6	Team Kuortane	27	9	1	2	15	72	104	−32	31	Playoff quarterfinals

Updated to match(es) played on 20 March 2022. Source: Leijonat

Official ranking

Teams are officially ranked by average points per game with ties broken by greater number of games played, followed by best goal difference, then greater number of goals.

Pos	Team	PpG
1	K-Espoo	2.77
2	HIFK	2.69
3	Kärpät	1.79
4	Ilves	1.43
5	TPS	1.31
6	Kuortane	1.15

=== Schedule ===
Regular Season
Date	Home	Score	Visitor	OT	Atn	Notes
8 January	Kuortane	0–5	Kärpät		1	Shutout recorded by Kati Asikainen (1)
9 January	TPS	6–4	Kuortane		0	
15 January	TPS	2–1	Kärpät		0	
26 February	Kuortane	1–3	Ilves		60	
26 February	Kärpät	1–2	K-Espoo		82	
26 February	TPS	3–5	HIFK		60	
27 February	Kuortane	1–4	K-Espoo		60	
27 February	HIFK	5–0	TPS		87	Shutout recorded by Iina Kuusela (1)
27 February	Kärpät	2–1	Ilves		115	
2 March	K-Espoo	1–5	HIFK		143	
2 March	Ilves	3–1	Kuortane		70	
5 March	Ilves	5–4	TPS		85	
5 March	HIFK	3–0	Kuortane		137	Shutout recorded by Lumi Jääskeläinen (1)
5 March	K-Espoo	7–0	Kärpät		53	Shutout recorded by Tiia Pajarinen (1)
6 March	TPS	3–2	Ilves		60	
6 March	HIFK	2–0	Kärpät		76	Shutout recorded by Iina Kuusela (2)
6 March	K-Espoo	8–0	Kuortane		45	Game with largest goal difference, ±8; shutout recorded by Minja Drufva (1)
9 March	HIFK	3–0	Ilves		89	Shutout recorded by Iina Kuusela (3)
12 March	Kärpät	6–3	TPS		84	
12 March	K-Espoo	5–1	Ilves		52	
12 March	~~Kuortane~~	X	~~HIFK~~			Match cancelled
13 March	Ilves	0–4	K-Espoo		45	Shutout recorded by Minja Drufva (2)
13 March	Kärpät	1–6	HIFK		86	
13 March	~~Kuortane~~		~~TPS~~			Match cancelled
16 March	HIFK	3–2	K-Espoo		145	Highest attended game
18 March	K-Espoo	5–4	TPS	OT	51	
19 March	Ilves	3–5	HIFK		110	
19 March	~~Kärpät~~		~~Kuortane~~			Match cancelled
19 March	TPS	4–7	K-Espoo		30	
20 March	Ilves	1–2	Kärpät	OT	50	

=== Player statistics ===
Scoring leaders

The following players led the league in points at the conclusion of the regular season on 20 March 2022. In a change from the previous seasons, scoring statistics were carried over from the preliminaries and points scored in the regular season were added to those totals.

	Player	Team	GP	G	A	Pts	PIM
1	Estelle Duvin	TPS	26	31	26	57	65
2	Elisa Holopainen	K-Espoo	27	29	27	56	4
3	Matilda Nilsson	HIFK	29	37	18	55	22
4	Kiira Yrjänen	K-Espoo	28	26	20	46	10
5	Maija Otamo	TPS	23	17	27	44	37
6	Michaela Pejzlová	HIFK	21	15	27	42	8
7	Tinja-Mariia Haukijärvi	K-Espoo	30	18	19	37	33
8	Emmi Rakkolainen	K-Espoo	23	15	22	37	10
9	Emmanuelle Passard	HIFK	28	18	15	33	0
10	Julia Liikala	HIFK	27	15	18	33	10
11	Nelli Laitinen	K-Espoo	23	7	24	31	16
12	Anniina Kaitala	Ilves	27	17	13	30	10
13	Sofianna Sundelin	Kuortane	22	16	13	29	8
14	Oona Havana	Kärpät	25	13	14	27	10
15	Tilli Keränen	Kärpät	22	14	12	26	4

Goaltenders

The following goaltenders lead the league in save percentage at the conclusion of games played on 20 March 2022, while starting at least one third of matches. Goaltending statistics were not carried over from the preliminaries, only statistics accumulated in the regular season were counted towards totals.

	Player	Team	GP	TOI	W	L	S	GA	SO	SV%	GAA
1	Iina Kuusela	HIFK	6	360:00	6	0	113	4	3	.966	0.67
2	Minja Drufva	K-Espoo	4	240:00	4	0	75	5	2	.938	1.25
3	Kati Asikainen	Kärpät	5	299:04	2	3	188	13	1	.935	2.61
4	Johanna Oksman	Kärpät	4	244:25	2	2	151	11	0	.932	2.70
5	Tiia Pajarinen	K-Espoo	6	357:42	4	2	164	13	1	.927	2.18
6	Anni Keisala	Ilves	6	357:41	3	3	196	18	0	.916	3.02
7	Emilia Kyrkkö	Kuortane	5	285:35	0	4	178	17	0	.913	3.57
8	Lumi Jääskeläinen	HIFK	3	180:00	3	0	53	6	1	.898	2.00
9	Mila Houni	TPS	7	407:07	1	6	211	33	0	.865	4.86
10	Hennele Tarkiainen	Kuortane	3	125:41	0	3	68	12	0	.850	5.73

== Lower division series ==
The teams ranked seventh through tenth in the Naisten Liiga preliminaries – HPK, KalPa, RoKi, and Sport – progressed to the lower division series (Finnish: Alempi jatkosarja), where they were joined by the top two teams from the Naisten Mestis cross-qualifiers, Alavuden Peli-Veikot (APV) and Rauman Lukko. The lower division series began on 5 February and concluded on 20 March. It was played as a double round-robin, with every team playing each of their five opponents twice. The two teams with the top points per game averages at the conclusion of the series, HPK and KalPa, progress to the playoff quarterfinals. The remaining four teams – APV, Lukko, RoKi, and Sport – proceed to the qualifiers (Finnish: karsintasarja), where they face potential relegation.

=== Standings ===
Pos	Team	Pld	W	OTW	OTL	L	GF	GA	GD	Pts	Postseason placement
1	HPK	10	10	0	0	0	67	12	+55	30	Playoff quarterfinals
2	KalPa	10	6	2	0	2	34	18	+16	22	Playoff quarterfinals
3	RoKi	10	4	1	1	4	46	46	0	15	Qualifiers
4	Lukko	10	4	0	0	6	19	32	−13	12	Qualifiers
5	Sport	10	1	0	3	6	24	45	−21	6	Qualifiers
6	APV	10	1	1	0	8	29	66	−37	5	Qualifiers

Updated to match(es) played on 20 March 2022. Source: Leijonat

Official ranking

Pos	Team	PpG
1	HPK	3.00
2	KalPa	2.20
3	RoKi	1.50
4	Lukko	1.20
5	Sport	0.60
6	APV	0.50

=== Schedule ===
Lower Division
Date	Home	Score	Visitor	OT	Atn	Notes
5 February	RoKi	11–5	APV		61	
5 February	Sport	2–3	Lukko		–	
12 February	Sport	1–7	HPK		25	
13 February	RoKi	1–9	HPK		53	
13 February	APV	5–4	Sport	OT	100	
19 February	APV	4–6	Lukko		60	
20 February	APV	1–6	HPK		95	
26 February	HPK	7–2	RoKi		40	
26 February	KalPa	3–1	APV		52	
27 February	HPK	5–3	Lukko		40	
27 February	APV	7–5	RoKi		80	
2 March	RoKi	3–8	KalPa		64	
2 March	Lukko	0–2	HPK		60	Shutout recorded by Kassidy Sauvé (1)
5 March	RoKi	5–0	Lukko		55	Shutout recorded by Janika Järvikari (1)
5 March	APV	2–7	KalPa		85	
6 March	RoKi	7–1	Sport		64	
6 March	HPK	13–2	APV		50	Largest goal difference, ±11
6 March	KalPa	4–0	Lukko		53	Shutout recorded by Tiina Ranne (1)
9 March	KalPa	2–1	Sport	OT	43	
12 March	Sport	8–1	APV		68	
12 March	HPK	4–0	KalPa		40	Shutout recorded by Kassidy Sauvé (2)
12 March	Lukko	2–5	RoKi		50	
13 March	Sport	5–6	RoKi	OT	40	
13 March	Lukko	0–3	KalPa		60	Shutout recorded by Tiina Ranne (2)
16 March	Sport	1–3	KalPa		40	
19 March	HPK	9–0	Sport		120	Highest attended game; shutout recorded by Kassidy Sauvé (3)
19 March	KalPa	2–1	RoKi	OT	62	
19 March	Lukko	3–1	APV		40	
20 March	KalPa	2–5	HPK		63	
20 March	Lukko	2–1	Sport		60	

=== Player statistics ===
Scoring leaders

The following players led the series in points at the conclusion of lower division play on 20 March 2022. No statistics were carried over from the preliminaries, all totals represent tallies from the lower division only.

RoKi forward Jenna Hietala topped the scoring charts for both goals and points, with 18 goals and 24 points in 10 games played. Slovak forward Júlia Matejková of HPK and KalPa's Johanna Juutilainen tied to lead the series in assists, both tallying 12 assists in 10 games played.

	Player	Team	GP	G	A	Pts	PIM
1	Jenna Hietala	RoKi	10	18	6	24	0
2	Kiti Seikkula	HPK	10	12	11	23	0
3	Julia Matejkova	HPK	10	9	12	21	6
4	Jutta Stoltenberg	HPK	10	10	8	18	12
5	Noora Mylläri	Sport	9	11	6	17	6
6	Riikka Noronen	HPK	8	6	10	16	2
7	Jade Mäkivaara	HPK	8	5	11	16	0
8	Kaisla Kortelainen	KalPa	10	6	9	15	2
9	Johanna Juutilainen	KalPa	10	3	12	15	0
10	Saimi Lehto	HPK	7	5	9	14	2
11	Susanna Järvenpää	APV	10	6	7	13	4

Rauman Lukko was the only team not represented in the scoring leaders table at the conclusion of the lower division series. Lukko's top scorer was Roosa-Maria Kangasniemi, who notched 2 goals and 5 assists for 7 points in ten games played. She ranked 28th overall on the list of lower division scoring leaders.

Goaltenders

The following goaltenders lead the series in save percentage at the conclusion of lower division play on 20 March 2022, while starting at least one third of matches. Goaltending statistics were not carried over from the preliminaries, only statistics accumulated during the lower division series were considered.

	Player	Team	GP	TOI	W	L	S	GA	SO	SV%	GAA
1	Kassidy Sauvé	HPK	8	480:00	8	0	188	7	3	.964	0.88
2	Tiina Ranne	KalPa	9	543:10	7	2	245	17	2	.935	1.88
3	Melisa Mörönen	Sport	8	482:13	1	7	283	28	0	.910	3.48
4	Janika Järvikari	RoKi	7	371:10	4	1	197	20	1	.908	3.23
5	Johanna Niemi	Lukko	7	419:00	4	3	159	18	0	.898	2.58
6	Riina Valkama	APV	10	543:59	2	7	358	56	0	.865	6.18

== Playoffs ==
Quarterfinals
1	Kiekko-Espoo	3
8	KalPa Kuopio	1
4	Ilves Tampere	0
5	TPS Turku	3
2	HIFK Helsinki	3
7	HPK Hämeenlinna	1
3	Kärpät Oulu	3
6	Team Kuortane	0

Semifinals
1	Kiekko-Espoo	3
5	TPS Turku	0
2	HIFK Helsinki	3
3	Kärpät Oulu	0

Finals
1st place, gold medalist(s)	Kiekko-Espoo	3
2nd place, silver medalist(s)	HIFK Helsinki	2
Bronze medal game
3rd place, bronze medalist(s)	Kärpät Oulu	3
4	TPS Turku	2

== Qualification series ==
The qualification series (Finnish: karsintasarja) began on 26 March and concluded 10 April.

Three teams from the 2021 qualification series returned to the promotion/relegation tournament in 2022: Lukko, RoKi, and Vaasan Sport. Promoted from the Naisten Mestis to the lower division series alongside Lukko, APV last appeared in the 2020 qualification series, in which they did not gain promotion.

On April 3, Rovaniemen Kiekko (RoKi) and Rauman Lukko both amassed unbeatable point advantages and secured league positions. RoKi will remain in the Naisten Liiga for the 2022–23 season and Lukko will make their return to the league after being relegated to the Naisten Mestis in the 2020–21 Naisten Liiga qualifiers.

Vaasan Sport will be relegated to the 2022–23 Naisten Mestis, following four seasons in the Naisten Liiga in which they qualified for the playoffs as the eighth-seed in 2020 and faced relegation in both 2021 and 2022. APV will return to the Naisten Mestis after missing out on the opportunity for promotion for the second time in three seasons.

Pos	Team	Pld	W	OTW	OTL	L	GF	GA	GD	Pts	2022–23 placement
1	RoKi	16	8	1	1	6	80	62	+18	27	Qualify for Naisten Liiga
2	Lukko	16	8	0	0	8	39	50	−11	24	Qualify for Naisten Liiga
3	Sport	16	4	0	3	9	42	70	−28	15	Relegated to Naisten Mestis
4	APV	16	2	1	0	13	45	95	−50	8	Relegated to Naisten Mestis

Updated to match(es) played on 3 April 2022. Source: Suomen Jääkiekkoliitto

Official ranking

Pos	Team	GP	Pts	PpG
1	RoKi	16	27	1.69
2	Lukko	16	24	1.50
3	Sport	16	15	0.94
4	APV	16	8	0.50

=== Results ===
26 March 2022; 12:00	APV Alavus	4–6 (0–2, 1–1, 3–3)	Sport Vaasa	Alavus Areena, Alavus; Attendance: 80

Game reference

Riina Valkama
Goalies
Melisa Mörönen
Referee:
Seppo Rintaoja
Linesmen:
Mika Pajunen
Elisa Kohtala

	0–1	06:20 – Hautamäki (Laamanen, Kuusisto)
	0–2	08:40 – PS – Mylläri
Vainionpää – 31:01	1–2
	1–3	31:01 – Tervala (Karppinen)
	1–4	43:16 – Viitala (Tervala, Mylläri)
	1–5	48:23 – Mylläri (Haaranoja)
Peltoniemi (Kaitola, Järvenpää) – PP – 52:17	2–5
Niemistö (Kaitola, Paalanen) – 53:35	3–5
Saarimaa – 56:05	4–5
	4–6	58:01 – Viitala (Mylläri, Hautamäki)

20 min
Penalties
6 min
37
Shots
39

26 March 2022; 13:00	RoKi Rovaniemi	1–4 (0–2, 0–0, 1–2)	Lukko Rauma	Lappi Areena, Rovaniemi; Attendance: 63

Game reference

Janika Järvikari
Goalies
Saara Rintamaa
Referee:
Mikko Kallio
Linesmen:
Sami Kylmäluoma
Lauri Alamartin

	0–1	08:20 – PP – Koskinen
	0–2	19:13 – SH – M. Koski (Lehikoinen)
	0–3	46:13 – Grönroos (M. Koski, Kaukola)
O. Koski (Hietala) – 50:53	1–3
	1–4	59:22 – EN – M. Koski (Toivonen, Kangasniemi)

6 min
Penalties
12 min
31
Shots
27

27 March 2022; 13:00	RoKi Rovaniemi	7–1 (4–1, 1–0, 2–0)	APV Alavus	Lappi Areena, Rovaniemi; Attendance: 39

Game reference

Janita Haapasaari
Goalies
Rosa-Maria Ojala
Referee:
Sami Kylmäluoma
Linesmen:
Kalle Tuovila
Lauri Alamartin

Keskisarja (Mourujärvi) – PP – 02:33	1–0
Lahtela (Hietala) – 03:32	2–0
Kontiosalo (Lahtela, Hietala) – PP – 09:06	3–0
E. Lappalainen (Lahtela) – PP – 10:33	4–0
	4–1	14:53 – PP – Nuolikoski
Mourujärvi (Iso-Kouvola, Ollila) – SH – 26:20	5–1
Lahtela (Kontiosalo, Heikonen) – 41:10	6–1
Ollila – 49:07	7–1

8 min
Penalties
22 min
43
Shots
35

27 March 2022; 15:15	Sport Vaasa	2–3 (0–1, 1–2, 1–0)	Lukko Rauma	Vaasa Arena, Vaasa; Attendance: 40

Game reference

Melisa Mörönen
Goalies
Johanna Niemi
Referee:
Robert Svartbäck
Linesmen:
Mika Mäkinen
Eero Torkinlampi

	0–1	00:46 – Toivonen (Julkunen, Kangasniemi)
	0–2	29:39 – Grönroos (Koski, Leino)
Mylläri (Viitala, Erkkilä) – 32:33	1–2
	1–3	37:00 – Toivonen (Kahlhammer, Brofelt)
Viitala (Haaranoja) – 45:10	2–3

4 min
Penalties
6 min
31
Shots
28

2 April 2022; 12:30	RoKi Rovaniemi	8–0 (2–0, 5–0, 1–0)	Sport Vaasa	Lappi Areena, Rovaniemi; Attendance: 42

Game reference

Janita Haapasaari
Goalies
Melisa Mörönen
Oona Mäki
Referee:
Mikko Kallio
Linesmen:
Teemu Paldanius
Anton Heikka

Keskisarja (I. Lappalainen) – 01:02	1–0
Hietala – 18:53	2–0
Keskisarja (Iso-Kouvola) – 25:51	3–0
Ad. Makkonen (Iso-Kouvola, Haapasaari) – PP – 29:16	4–0
Hietala (Kontiosalo, Lappalainen) – PP – 31:54	5–0
Kontiosalo (Hietala) – 37:14	6–0
Iso-Kouvola (Mourujärvi) – 37:47	7–0
Iso-Kouvola (Keskisarja, Mourujärvi) – 46:25	8–0

14 min
Penalties
14 min
24
Shots
18

2 April 2022; 16:15	Lukko Rauma	2–3 (0–1, 2–1, 0–1)	APV Alavus	Eurajoen jäähalli, Eurajoki; Attendance: 40

Game reference

Johanna Niemi
Goalies
Riina Valkama
Referee:
Jussi Hirsimäki
Linesmen:
Teemu Karhu
Teemu Kantola

	0–1	09:06 – Paalanen (Järvenpää, Särkinen)
Koski (Grönroos, Hyytiä) – 20:24	1–1
	1–2	24:58 – Paalanen (Järvenpää, Vainionpää)
Hyytiä (Koski, Karru) – 27:40	2–2
	2–3	57:36 – Niemistö (Särkinen, Nuolikoski)

6 min
Penalties
4 min
32
Shots
24

3 April 2022; 13:00	APV Alavus	2–3 (0–0, 1–2, 1–1)	Lukko Rauma	Alavus Areena, Alavus; Attendance: 78

Game reference

Riina Valkama
Goalies
Johanna Niemi
Referee:
Joni Koivunen
Linesmen:
Jesse Viertola
Lassi Mukkala

	0–1	28:24 – Harjula (Brofelt, Hyytiä)
Turunen (Järvenpää, Peltoniemi) – PP – 34:57	1–1
	1–2	39:31 – Kahlhammer (Harjula)
	1–3	44:18 – Koski (Brofelt, Harjula)
Turunen (Järvenpää) – 45:16	2–3

6 min
Penalties
12 min
33
Shots
34

3 April 2022; 14:15	Sport Vaasa	1–6 (0–3, 1–2, 0–1)	RoKi Rovaniemi	Vaasa Arena, Vaasa; Attendance: 25

Game reference

Melisa Mörönen
Oona Mäki
Goalies
Olivia Last
Referee:
Tero Peltomaa
Linesmen:
Teemu Saari
Sebastian Rosenqvist

	0–1	01:45 – Ad. Makkonen (Ollila)
	0–2	09:18 – Mourujärvi (Kontiosalo, Heikonen)
	0–3	13:30 – Keskisarja (Lahtela, I. Lappalainen)
	0–4	27:38 – Keskisarja (Ad. Makkonen)
Mylläri (Viitala) – 29:04	1–4
	1–5	33:01 – Keskisarja (E. Lappalainen, Lassila)
	1–6	42:47 – PP – Hietala (Kontiosalo)

10 min
Penalties
6 min
32
Shots
35

9 April 2022; 13:30	Sport Vaasa	3–1 (1–0, 1–1, 1–0)	APV Alavus	Vaasa Arena, Vaasa; Attendance: 60

Game reference

Oona Mäki
Goalies
Riina Valkama
Referee:
Tero Peltomaa
Linesmen:
Joonas Nurmi
Eero Torkinlampi

Kuusisto (Haaranoja, Fagerudd) – 14:48	1–0
Suoniemi (Kuusisto) – PP – 33:01	2–0
	2–1	38:55 – Järvenpää (Kaitola, Turunen)
Tervala (Kuusisto) – 47:49	3–1

6 min
Penalties
20 min
39
Shots
26

9 April 2022; 15:30	Lukko Rauma	5–4 (3–1, 2–1, 0–2)	RoKi Rovaniemi	Eurajoen jäähalli, Eurajoki; Attendance: 80

Game reference

Saara Rintamaa
Goalies
Olivia Last
Janika Järvikari
Referee:
Niko Rautavuori
Linesmen:
Teemu Karhu
Kaapo Elomaa

Koski (Laiho, Kangasniemi) – 06:18	1–0
Toivonen – 11:23	2–0
	2–1	17:00 – Hietala (Ad. Makkonen, Kontiosalo)
Koski (Brofelt, Hyytiä) – 19:05	3–1
Hyytiä (Koski) – 29:39	4–1
	4–2	32:02 – PP – Hietala (Kontiosalo, Mourujärvi)
Hyytiä (Koski, Arola) – 39:02	5–2
	5–3	48:42 – Lahtela (Hietala, Kontiosalo)
	5–4	59:53 – EA – Keskisarja (Kontiosalo, Mourujärvi)

2 min
Penalties
6 min
20
Shots
25

10 April 2022; 13:00	APV Alavus	5–8 (1–3, 4–3, 0–2)	RoKi Rovaniemi	Alavus Areena, Alavus; Attendance: 70

Game reference

Riina Valkama
Goalies
Janika Järvikari
Referee:
Kristian Ouri
Linesmen:
Mika Pajunen
Lassi Mukkala

	0–1	03:41 – E. Lappalainen (I. Lappalainen, Keskisarja)
	0–2	05:08 – Felcmanová (Velinská, Koski)
Turunen (Niemistö) – 11:04	1–2
	1–3	15:07 – Hietala (Kontiosalo, Felcmanová)
Järvenpää (Ylinen) – 22:28	2–3
Liikala (Kaitola, Mäki) – 23:09	3–3
Järvenpää (Turunen, Niemistö) – 26:10	4–3
	4–4	31:30 – E. Lappalainen (I. Lappalainen, Mourujärvi)
Turunen (Järvenpää, Niemistö) – 32:14	5–4
	5–5	33:12 – Ad. Makkonen (Kontiosalo)
	5–6	34:21 – Tulkki (Hietala)
	5–7	41:20 – Keskisarja (E. Leppalainen)
	5–8	43:53 – Felcmanová (Kontiosalo, Keskisarja)

6 min
Penalties
6 min
35
Shots
66

10 April 2022; 14:00	Lukko Rauma	3–6 (2–1, 1–2, 0–3)	Sport Vaasa	Eurajoen jäähalli, Eurajoki; Attendance: 90

Game reference

Johanna Niemi
Goalies
Melisa Mörönen
Referee:
Jussi Hirsimäki
Linesmen:
Vilho Salo
Teemu Kantola

	0–1	02:31 – Viitala (Tervala, Kupari)
Koskinen (Julkunen, Kangasniemi) – PP – 04:12	1–1
Toivonen (Leino) – 05:50	2–1
Karru (Harjula, Brofelt) – 31:12	3–1
	3–2	36:57 – Mylläri (Suoniemi, Karppinen)
	3–3	37:46 – Tervala (Laamanen, Kuusisto)
	3–4	43:59 – SH – Mylläri (Viitala)
	3–5	58:37 – EN – Kuusisto
	3–6	59:43 – EN – Mylläri (Kupari)

2 min
Penalties
8 min
17
Shots
21

=== Statistics ===
Scoring leaders

The following players led scoring in the qualification series at the conclusion of games played on 9 April 2022.

	Player	Team	GP	G	A	Pts	PIM
1	Maija Koski	Lukko	5	6	5	11	0
2	Jenna Hietala	RoKi	5	5	5	10	4
3	Sanni Kontiosalo	RoKi	5	2	8	10	2
4	Moona Keskisarja	RoKi	5	7	1	8	2
5	Emmi Mourujärvi	RoKi	5	2	5	7	6
6	Noora Mylläri	Sport	5	4	2	6	8
7	Ella Lahtela	RoKi	5	3	3	6	0
7	Sara Hyytiä	Lukko	5	3	3	6	2
9	Susanna Järvenpää	APV	5	1	5	6	18
10	Susanna Viitala	Sport	5	3	2	5	0
11	Viivi Iso-Kouvola	RoKi	3	2	3	5	0

Leading goaltenders

The following goaltenders have played at least one match in the qualification series at the conclusion of games played on 9 April 2022, sorted by save percentage.

	Player	Team	GP	TOI	W	L	SA	GA	SO	SV%	GA60
1	Janita Haapasaari	RoKi	2	120:00	2	0	53	1	1	.981	0.50
2	Johanna Niemi	Lukko	3	180:00	2	1	88	7	0	.926	2.33
3	Oona Mäki	Sport	3	112:22	1	0	49	4	0	.925	2.14
4	Saara Rintamaa	Lukko	2	120:00	2	0	52	5	0	.912	2.50
5	Riina Valkama	APV	4	238:07	1	3	144	14	0	.911	3.53
6	Olivia Last	RoKi	2	80:00	1	0	41	4	0	.911	3.00
7	Janika Järvikari	RoKi	W	96:55	0	2	42	5	0	.894	3.10
8	Rosa-Marie Ojala	APV	1	60:00	0	1	43	7	0	.860	7.00
9	Melisa Mörönen	Sport	4	187:38	1	3	101	18	0	.849	5.76

== Awards and honours ==
- Kultainen Kypärä ('Golden Helmet'): Anni Keisala, Ilves

=== Finnish Ice Hockey Association awards ===
- Riikka Nieminen Award (Player of the Year): Anni Keisala, Ilves
- Tuula Puputti Award (Best goaltender): Anni Keisala, Ilves
- Päivi Halonen Award (Best defenceman): Nelli Laitinen, Kiekko-Espoo
- Katja Riipi Award (Best forward): Elisa Holopainen, Kiekko-Espoo
- Noora Räty Award (Rookie of the Year): Tuuli Tallinen, Team Kuortane
- Marianne Ihalainen Award (Top point scorer): Estelle Duvin, TPS
- Tiia Reima Award (Top goal scorer): Matilda Nilsson, HIFK
- Sari Fisk Award (Best plus/minus): Kiira Yrjänen, Kiekko-Espoo
- Emma Laaksonen Award (Fair-play player): Emmanuelle Passard, HIFK
- Student Athlete Award: Emmi Rakkolainen, Kiekko-Espoo
- U18 Student Athlete Award: Oona Havana, Kärpät
- Hannu Saintula Award (Coach of the Year): Sami Haapanen, Kiekko-Espoo
- Karoliina Rantamäki Award (MVP of the Playoffs): Nelli Laitinen, Kiekko-Espoo
- Anu Hirvonen Award (Best referee): Johanna Tauriainen
- Johanna Suban Award (Best linesman): Linnea Sainio

Source: Finnish Ice Hockey Association

French forward Estelle Duvin of TPS claimed the Marianne Ihalainen Award as regular season scoring champion, amassing a staggering 31 goals and 26 assists for 57 points in 26 games played. She became the second international player to ever capture the honor, following Czech forward Michaela Pejzlová who won the award in 2021. HIFK Naiset winger Matilda Nilsson was the top goalscorer of the regular season, notching 37 goals in 29 games played and winning the Tiia Reima Award for the second consecutive season.

=== All-Star teams ===
All-Star Team

- Goaltender: Anni Keisala, Ilves
- Defenceman: Nelli Laitinen, Kiekko-Espoo
- Defenceman: Sanni Rantala, Kiekko-Espoo
- Left Wing: Elisa Holopainen, Kiekko-Espoo
- Center: Estelle Duvin, TPS
- Right Wing: Kiira Yrjänen, Kiekko-Espoo

All-Star Team II

- Goaltender: Iina Kuusela, HIFK
- Defenceman: Krista Parkkonen, HIFK
- Defenceman: Oona Koukkula, Team Kuortane
- Left Wing: Sofianna Sundelin, Team Kuortane
- Center: Michaela Pejzlová, HIFK
- Right Wing: Matilda Nilsson, HIFK

Source: Finnish Ice Hockey Association

=== Player of the Month ===
- September 2021: Kiira Yrjänen (F), Kiekko-Espoo
- October 2021: Estelle Duvin (F), TPS
- November 2021: Elisa Holopainen (F), Kiekko-Espoo
- December 2021: too few games played due to holiday break, no player named
- January 2022: number of games limited due to COVID-19 Omicron, no player named
- February/March 2022: Suvi Käyhkö (F), Kärpät
