= Noora Räty =

Finnish ice hockey goaltender and coach

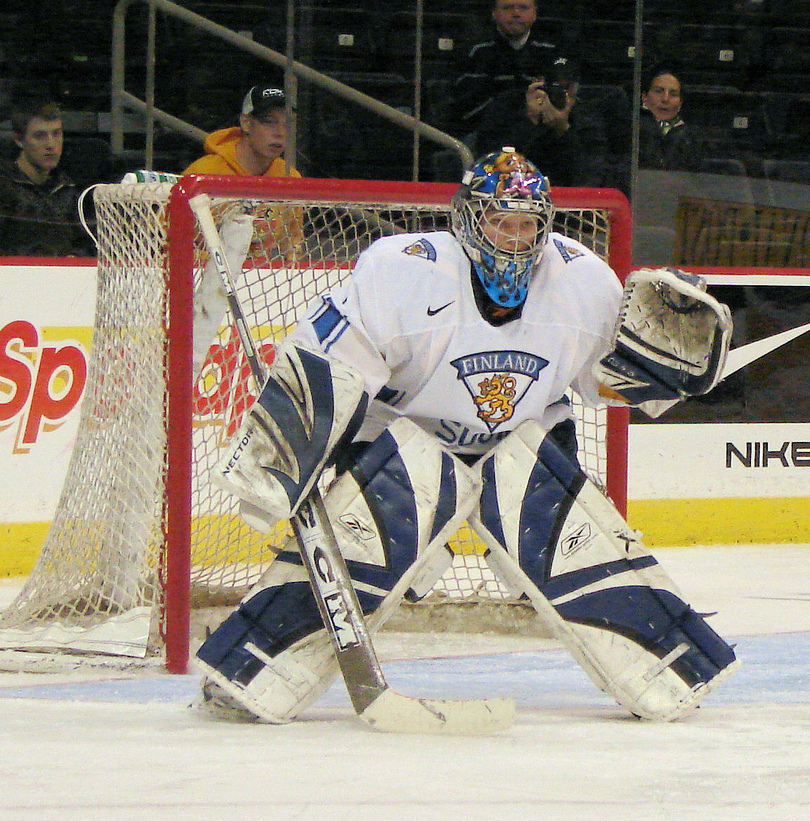
- Born: 29 May 1989 (age 37) Espoo, Finland
- Height: 1.65 m (5 ft 5 in)
- Weight: 65 kg (143 lb; 10 st 3 lb)
- Position: Goaltender
- Catches: Left
- Played for: HPK Hämeenlinna; KRS Vanke Rays; Espoo Blues; Minnesota Golden Gophers; Ilves Tampere; SKIF Nizhny Novgorod; Kiekko-Vantaa; Bewe TuusKi; KJT; Pyry Nokia
- Current coach: Shenzhen KRS
- Coached for: Cretin-Derham Hall Raiders
- National team: Finland
- Playing career: 2004–present
Medal record
Olympic Games
| Bronze medal – third place | 2010 Vancouver | Ice hockey |
| Bronze medal – third place | 2018 Pyeongchang | Ice hockey |
World Championships
| Silver medal – second place | 2019 Finland |
| Bronze medal – third place | 2008 China |
| Bronze medal – third place | 2009 Finland |
| Bronze medal – third place | 2011 Switzerland |
| Bronze medal – third place | 2017 United States |

Noora Helena Räty (born 29 May 1989) is a Finnish ice hockey goaltender and the goaltending coach of Shenzhen KRS in the Chinese Women's Ice Hockey League. She was a founding board member of the Professional Women's Hockey Players Association (PWHPA) and was a member of the board affiliated with the Minnesota chapter of the organization until signing a Premier Hockey Federation (PHF) contract with the Metropolitan Riveters in May 2023.

Regarded as one of the best goaltenders in the world, Räty has won two Olympic bronze medals and has competed in four Olympic Games as a member of the Finnish national ice hockey team, earning All-Star honours at the 2018 tournament. Across nine IIHF World Championships, she has earned five medals and has been awarded Best Goaltender five times, named to the All-Star Team four times, and was the MVP in 2008.

A two-time NCAA Ice Hockey Tournament champion and two-time All-American, Räty held the NCAA Division I all-time career records for best save percentage, most shutouts, and most wins. Her club career has included playing in the Canadian Women's Hockey League (CWHL), the Naisten Liiga (called the Naisten SM-sarja until 2017), and the Russian Women's Hockey League, in addition to being the first woman to play as a goaltender in both the Finnish men's second- and third-tier professional leagues, the Mestis and the Suomi-sarja.

== Playing career ==
Räty began her senior club career at age 15 with the Espoo Blues of the Naisten SM-sarja, the top women's ice hockey league in Finland (renamed Naisten Liiga in 2017). In her first season, 2005–06, she recorded stellar a .951 save percentage (SV%) and 1.40 goals against average (GAA) while playing in 20 of 22 games. The phenomenal season earned her the Naisten SM-sarja Rookie of the Year Award in 2005–06; in 2010, the award was renamed in her honour as the Noora Räty Award. The teen continued to impress over the following seasons, earning the Naisten SM-sarja Best Goaltender Award in 2006–07 and the Playoff MVP Award in 2007–08 and 2008–09. During the four seasons she was active in the Naisten SM-sarja, 2005–06 to 2008–09, she played 55 regular season games and recorded 14 shutouts while maintaining a save percentage above .960. Across 28 Finnish Championship playoff games, she had a GAA of just 1.15 and tallied 8 shutouts, leading the Espoo Blues to three consecutive championship victories.

In addition to playing in the Naisten SM-liiga, Räty trained and competed with the Espoo Blues men's junior A team in the Nuorten SM-liiga, the top junior league in Finland. She also attended lukio (advanced secondary school, comparable to gymnasium) at the Haukilahden lukio in the Haukilahti neighborhood of her hometown of Espoo and played ice hockey with the school team, earning the school's Hockey Player of the Year award in 2006 and 2008.

=== Minnesota Golden Gophers ===
Räty was recruited by the University of Minnesota to play ice hockey with the Minnesota Golden Gophers, a member of the Western Collegiate Hockey Association (WCHA) of NCAA Division I. She began her college ice hockey career at the university in the autumn of 2009 with fellow Finnish national team player Mira Jalosuo. Räty's first start in goal for the Gophers came in the team's second game of the 2009–10 season at home against Syracuse University (a 4–1 win). Through the WCHA conference tournament on 7 March 2010, Räty amassed a 17–3–4 record in 24 starts with 7 shutouts, a GAA of 1.24, and a save percentage of .951.

Räty won a number of WCHA conference awards during the 2009–10 season, being named WCHA Goaltending Champion (based on GAA), the goaltender of the All-WCHA First Team, and the goaltender of the All-WCHA Rookie Team. Räty was also named the WCHA Defensive Player of the Week four times and WCHA Rookie of the Week once.

In March 2010, Räty became only the second freshman to be a finalist for the Patty Kazmaier Award. She set a Golden Gophers club record for most assists in one season by a goaltender (3).

To start the 2010–11 season, Raty had a shutout in the first three games of the season. On 22 and 23 October 2010, she recorded back to back shutouts against the St. Cloud State Huskies. She held the Huskies scoreless as Minnesota swept the series by scores of 5–0 and 3–0, respectively. Raty played the full 120:00 minutes of the series. She accumulated 14 saves in the first game and 18 in the second for a 32-goal shutout.

Räty played on national championship teams in 2011–12 and 2012–13. The 2012–13 team finished 41–0–0, and the team won the last 49 games of Räty's career. Räty finished with both the career and single-season record for shutouts.

=== Kiekko-Vantaa ===
In March 2014, Yle reported that Räty had signed a contract for the 2014–15 season with Kiekko-Vantaa of the Mestis, the second level of Finnish men's hockey after the Liiga. She would become only the second woman to play in the Mestis, the first being Hayley Wickenheiser in 2003 with HC Salamat.

Räty was loaned to the Bewe TuusKi of the Suomi-sarja, the third level of Finnish men's hockey, for the beginning of the season. She played her first Mestis game for Kiekko-Vantaa on 22 October 2014, becoming the first Finnish woman and first female goaltender to play in the league.

=== CWHL ===
Selected in the first round of the 2017 CWHL Draft by the Chinese expansion team Kunlun Red Star WIH, she emerged as a key contributor for a club that finished the 2017–18 CWHL season in second place. Räty's first win with the Red Star took place on 28 October 2017, a 4–3 overtime win versus the Calgary Inferno in which she recorded 39 saves. Coincidentally, Annina Rajahuhta, a teammate from the Finnish national team, recorded the game-winning goal in overtime.

By season's end, Räty emerged as the CWHL's regular season goaltending champion, leading the league in goals against average. She also tied with Emerance Maschmeyer of Les Canadiennes for most shutouts, with 6. Räty won the CWHL Goaltender of the Year Award, becoming the first European-born goaltender to capture the honor.

Räty was the starting goaltender for the Red Star in the 2018 Clarkson Cup finals, which were held in Toronto. Challenging the Markham Thunder, the contest went into overtime, where Laura Stacey scored with 2:11 left in the 4-on-4 overtime, as Markham prevailed by a 2–1 tally for its first-ever championship title. Räty recorded 37 saves in the contest.

=== PHF ===
As "the most individually decorated player to sign in the [PHF] in the post-CWHL/NHWL era," Räty was a highlight addition to the Metropolitan Riveters when she signed with the team on 16 May 2023. The signing came as a surprise to many, not only because Räty had been listed as a PWHPA board member as recently as 15 May 2023, but also because she had previously shared in Finnish-language interviews that she intended to join the expected PWHPA league in the 2023–24 season.

== International play ==
Räty joined the Finnish women's national team at age 15 and recorded over 100 games in net with the team before retiring from international competition in 2022. At the age of 16, she participated with Team Finland in the women's ice hockey tournament at the 2006 Winter Olympics in Turin.

During the 2008 World Championships, Räty recorded a 30-save shutout of Team USA for a 1–0 victory. She was named the Best Goalie of the Tournament by the Directorate in 2007 and in 2008, and earned the Most Valuable Player of the Tournament award in 2008. At the 2009 World Championships she maintained a 1.48 goals against average and a 3–1–0 record, backstopping Finland for their second-straight bronze medal.

She won a bronze medal at the 2010 Four Nations Cup in St. John's, Newfoundland.

Räty posted a shutout in the gold medal of the 2017 Nations Cup against the Canadian Women's Development Team, which featured opposing goaltender Emerance Maschmeyer. Finland prevailed in a 1–0 final that saw Michelle Karvinen log the game-winning tally.

== Personal life ==
Räty was one of the nine founding board members of the Professional Women's Hockey Players Association (PWHPA) and the only member to hold citizenship outside of North America. She has spoken about her hopes that the NHL will create a professional women's national hockey league in North America and her desire to play a part in the creation of such a league.

Räty and her partner, Karel Popper, became engaged in June 2019. Popper is a professional goaltending instructor with MEGA Goaltending and joined the KRS Vanke Rays Shenzhen as a goaltending coach for the 2020–21 ZhHL season. The couple reside in Minneapolis with their dog, Dino.

In 2019, Räty was a contestant on the third season of Selviytyjät Suomi, the Finnish version of Survivor. She was the fourth person voted out on the ninth day of the season, placing 13th.

== Career statistics ==
=== Regular season and playoffs ===
| | | | Regular season | | | | | | | | | Playoffs |
| Season | Team | League | GP | W | L | T | Min | GA | SO | GAA | SV% | GP | W | L | Min | GA | SO | GAA | SV% |
| 2005–06 | Espoo Blues | NSMs | 20 | 15 | 4 | 0 | 1157 | 27 | 5 | 1.40 | .951 | 6 | 3 | 3 | 389 | 10 | 0 | 1.55 | .956 |
| 2006–07 | Espoo Blues | NSMs | 19 | 14 | 3 | 0 | 1141 | 23 | 5 | 1.21 | .954 | 7 | 6 | 1 | 440 | 9 | 3 | 1.23 | .958 |
| 2007–08 | Espoo Blues | NSMs | 11 | | | | | | | 1.74 | .946 | 9 | | | | | | 0.97 | .970 |
| 2008–09 | Espoo Blues | NSMs | 5 | 5 | 0 | 0 | 300:00 | 1 | 4 | 0.20 | .992 | 6 | | | | | | 0.83 | .969 |
| 2009–10 | Minnesota Golden Gophers | NCAA | 26 | 18 | 4 | 4 | 1623:42 | 36 | 7 | 1.33 | .948 | – | – | – | – | – | – | – | – |
| 2010–11 | Minnesota Golden Gophers | NCAA | 35 | 25 | 8 | 2 | 2036:41 | 60 | 9 | 1.77 | .941 | – | – | – | – | – | – | – | – |
| 2011–12 | Minnesota Golden Gophers | NCAA | 40 | 33 | 5 | 2 | 2361:03 | 53 | 10 | 1.35 | .942 | – | – | – | – | – | – | – | – |
| 2012–13 | Minnesota Golden Gophers | NCAA | 38 | 38 | 0 | 0 | 2240:11 | 36 | 17 | 0.96 | .956 | – | – | – | – | – | – | – | – |
| 2013–14 | Tampereen Ilves | NSMs | 2 | | | | | 5 | | | .940 | – | – | – | – | – | – | – | – |
| 2013–14 | SKIF Nizhny Novgorod | RWHL | 5 | | | | 300:00 | 8 | | 1.60 | | – | – | – | – | – | – | – | – |
| 2014–15 | Kiekko-Vantaa | Mestis | 8 | | | | | | | 3.73 | .893 | – | – | – | – | – | – | – | – |
| 2014–15 | Bewe TuusKi (L) | Suomi-sarja | 6 | | | | | | | 2.74 | .916 | – | – | – | – | – | – | – | – |
| 2015–16 | KJT Tuusula | Suomi-sarja | 17 | | | | | | | 3.59 | .899 | 3 | | | | | | 4.51 | .894 |
| 2016–17 | KJT Tuusula | Suomi-sarja | 7 | | | | | | | 4.41 | .878 | – | – | – | – | – | – | – | – |
| 2016–17 | Nokia Pyry | Suomi-sarja | 4 | | | | | | | 2.97 | .898 | 0 | 0 | 0 | 0:00 | 0 | 0 | 0 | 0 |
| 2017–18 | Kunlun Red Star WIH | CWHL | 20 | 16 | 3 | 0 | 1160 | 31 | 6 | 1.60 | .944 | 4 | 2 | 2 | 315 | 7 | 1 | 1.34 | .961 |
| 2018–19 | Shenzhen KRS Vanke Rays | CWHL | 20 | 8 | 12 | 0 | 1170 | 48 | 2 | 2.46 | .921 | – | – | – | – | – | – | – | – |
| 2019–20 | Shenzhen KRS Vanke Rays | ZhHL | 5 | 4 | 1 | – | 297:46 | 6 | 2 | 1.21 | .962 | 4 | 4 | – | 240:00 | 6 | 0 | 1.50 | .957 |
| 2020–21 | KRS Vanke Rays | ZhHL | 5 | 4 | 1 | – | 256:28 | 10 | 1 | 2.34 | .902 | – | – | – | – | – | – | – | – |
| 2021–22 | HPK | NSML | 14 | 7 | 5 | – | 822:47 | 24 | 2 | 1.75 | .954 | – | – | – | – | – | – | – | – |
| 2021–22 | KRS Vanke Rays | ZhHL | 11 | 11 | 0 | – | 642 | 10 | 3 | 0.94 | .964 | 8 | 6 | 1 | 464 | 10 | 0 | 1.30 | .950 |
| 2022–23 | HPK | NSML | 9 | 5 | 3 | – | 499:01 | 13 | 2 | 1.56 | .943 | 7 | 3 | 4 | 414:34 | 18 | 1 | 2.61 | .924 |
| Naisten SM-sarja totals | | | 80 | 46 | 15 | – | 3920 | 80 | 18 | 1.35 | .954 | 35 | 18 | 8 | 1603 | 27 | 6 | 1.57 | .950 |
| NCAA totals | | | 139 | 114 | 17 | 8 | 8261:43 | 185 | 43 | 1.34 | .946 | – | – | – | – | – | – | – | – |
| Suomi-sarja totals | | | 34 | | | | | | | 3.43 | .900 | 3 | | | | | | 4.51 | .894 |
| CWHL totals | | | 40 | 24 | 15 | 0 | 2330 | 79 | 8 | 2.03 | .932 | 4 | 2 | 2 | 315 | 7 | 1 | 1.34 | .961 |
| ZhHL totals | | | 10 | 8 | 2 | – | 554:14 | 16 | 3 | 1.78 | .931 | 4 | 4 | – | 240:00 | 6 | 0 | 1.50 | .957 |

*Italics indicate totals calculated from incomplete statistics
Sources: CWHL, Elite Prospects, University of Minnesota Athletics, ZhHL

=== International ===
| Year | Team | Event | Result | GP | W | L | MIN | GA | SO | GAA | SV% |
|---|---|---|---|---|---|---|---|---|---|---|---|
| 2005 | Finland | WW | 4th | 1 | 0 | 1 | 29:27 | 4 | 0 | 8.15 | .810 |
| 2006 | Finland | OG | 4th | 3 | 1 | 1 | 104:43 | 6 | 1 | 3.44 | .867 |
| 2007 | Finland | WW | 4th | 5 | 2 | 3 | 301:32 | 10 | 2 | 1.99 | .932 |
| 2008 | Finland | WW | 3rd place, bronze medalist(s) | 4 | 3 | 1 | 243:42 | 6 | 1 | 1.48 | .926 |
| 2009 | Finland | WW | 3rd place, bronze medalist(s) | 3 | 2 | 1 | 170:48 | 10 | 0 | 3.51 | .886 |
| 2010 | Finland | OG | 3rd place, bronze medalist(s) | 5 | 3 | 2 | 302:33 | 15 | 0 | 2.97 | .884 |
| 2011 | Finland | WW | 3rd place, bronze medalist(s) | 5 | 2 | 3 | 304:05 | 10 | 0 | 1.97 | .957 |
| 2012 | Finland | WW | 4th | 4 | 1 | 3 | 234:48 | 15 | 0 | 3.83 | .903 |
| 2013 | Finland | WW | 4th | 5 | 1 | 4 | 282:32 | 14 | 0 | 2.97 | .909 |
| 2014 | Finland | OG | 5th | 6 | 3 | 3 | 358:57 | 13 | 1 | 2.17 | .929 |
| 2017 | Finland | WW | 3rd place, bronze medalist(s) | 6 | 3 | 3 | 355:03 | 12 | 2 | 2.03 | .924 |
| 2018 | Finland | OG | 3rd place, bronze medalist(s) | 6 | 3 | 3 | 355:25 | 16 | 0 | 2.70 | .911 |
| 2019 | Finland | WW | 2nd place, silver medalist(s) | 6 | 3 | 3 | 354:47 | 13 | 1 | 2.20 | .936 |
| World Championship totals | | | | 39 | 17 | 22 | 2276:44 | 94 | 6 | 2.53 | .924 |
| Olympic Games totals | | | | 20 | 10 | 9 | 1121:38 | 50 | 2 | 2.67 | .907 |
| Cumulative totals | | | | 59 | 27 | 31 | 3398:22 | 144 | 8 | 2.60 | .915 |

== Awards and honors ==
| Award | Year |
|---|---|
International
| World Championship Best Goaltender | 2007, 2008, 2011, 2017, 2019 |
| World Championship All-Star | 2008, 2013, 2017, 2019 |
| World Championship Bronze Medal | 2008, 2009, 2011, 2017 |
| World Championship MVP | 2008 |
| Olympic Bronze Medal | 2010, 2018 |
| Olympic All-Star | 2018 |
| World Championship Silver Medal | 2019 |
CWHL
| Goaltender of the Year | 2017–18 |
Russia
| Russian Champion | 2013–14, 2019–20, 2021–22 |
NCAA
| WCHA Defensive Player of the Week | Week of 19 October 2009 |
| WCHA Defensive Player of the Week | Week of 30 November 2009 |
| WCHA Defensive Player of the Week | Week of 7 December 2009 |
| WCHA Defensive Player of the Week | Week of 25 January 2010 |
| WCHA Defensive Player of the Week | Week of 27 October 2010 |
| WCHA Defensive Player of the Week | Week of 8 November 2011 |
| WCHA Defensive Player of the Week | Week of 25 October 2012 |
| WCHA Rookie of the Week | Week of 26 October 2009 |
| AHCA All-America First Team | 2009–10, 2012–13 |
| All-WCHA First Team | 2009–10, 2010–11, 2012–13 |
| Patty Kazmaier Award Finalist | 2009–10, 2010–11, 2012–13 |
| Patty Kazmaier Award Top-3 Finalist | 2009–10, 2012–13 |
| WCHA All-Rookie Team | 2009–10 |
| WCHA Goaltending Champion | 2009–10, 2012–13 |
| AHCA All-America Second Team | 2010–11 |
| WCHA All-Academic Team | 2010–11, 2011–12, 2012–13 |
| WCHA All-Tournament Team | 2011, 2012, 2013 |
| All-WCHA Third Team | 2011–12 |
| WCHA Tournament Most Outstanding Player | 2012, 2013 |
| NCAA Frozen Four Most Outstanding Player | 2012, 2013 |
| NCAA All-Tournament Team | 2012, 2013 |
| WCHA Scholar-Athlete Award | 2012–13 |
| WCHA 20th Anniversary Team | 2018 |
Naisten SM-sarja
| Rookie of the Year | 2005–06 |
| All-Star Team | 2006–07 |
| Best Goaltender | 2006–07 |
| Finnish Champion | 2006–07, 2007–08, 2008–09 |
| Playoff MVP | 2007–08, 2008–09 |

== Records ==
=== NCAA ===
Records valid through 2021–22 NCAA season.

Career

- 2nd most goalie wins (114)
- 2nd most goalie shutouts (43)
- 4th best save percentage (.946)
- 6th best goals against average (1.34)
- 7th best goalie winning percentage (.849)
- 16th most goalie saves (3,250)

Season

- Best goalie winning percentage (1.000), 2012–13
- 2nd most goalie shutouts (17), 2012–13
- 5th best save percentage (.956), 2012–13
- 9th best goals against average (0.96), 2012–13

=== WCHA ===
Records valid through 2021–22 NCAA season.

Career

- Most minutes played (8261:43)
- Most wins (114)
- 2nd most shutouts (43)
- 3rd best save percentage (.946)
- 5th best winning percentage (.849)
- 6th lowest goals-against avgerage (1.34) – tied with Kristen Campbell
- 6th most saves (3,250)

Season

- Most wins (38), 2012–13 season – tied for first with Amanda Leveille (2013–14)

- 4th most wins (33), 2011–12 season (Note: Tied with Jessie Vetter (2008–09), Alex Rigsby (2011–12), and Ann-Renée Desbiens (2015–16))
- 19th most wins (25), 2010–11 season (Note: Tied with Sidney Peters (2016–17) and Maddie Rooney (2016–17))

- Best winning percentage (1.000), 2012–13 season – tied for first with Crystal Nichols (1999–2000)
- 2nd most shutouts (17), 2012–13 (Note: Tied with Ann-Renée Desbiens (2016–17))

- 8th most shutouts (10), 2011–12 (Note: Tied with Jessie Vetter (2006–07, 2007–08), Amanda Leveille (2015–16), and Kassidy Sauvé (2017–18))
- 13th most shutouts (9), 2010–11 (Note: Tied with Meghan Horras (2004–05) and Alex Rigsby (2011–12))
- 20th most shutouts (7), 2009–10 (Note: Tied with eight other goaltenders: Kennedy Blair, Brittony Chartier, Christine Dufour, Jackie MacMillan, Alex Rigsby (3x), and Riitta Schäublin)

- 3rd most games played (40), 2011–12 season (Note: Tied with Jessie Vetter (2008–09) and Alex Rigsby (2011–12))

- 7th most games played (38), 2012–13 season (Note: Tied with Jessie Vetter (2007–08), Ann-Renée Desbiens (2015–16), and Kristen Campbell (2017–18))

- 4th most minutes played (2361:09), 2011–12 season

- 11th most minutes played (2240:11), 2012–13 season

- 4th best save percentage (.956), 2012–13

- 9th best save percentage (.948), 2009–10 (Note: Tied with Kim Martin (2007–08))

- 5th lowest goals-against average (0.96), 2012–13 season

- 19th lowest goals-against average (1.33), 2009–10 season (Note: Tied with Amanda Tapp (1999–2000))

Single-game

- 6th most minutes played (118:46), Minnesota vs. North Dakota on 16 March 2013

Single-period

- Fewest saves (0), Minnesota vs. St. Cloud State (1st period) on 5 October 2012 – tied for first with six other goaltenders: Kayla Black, Erica Killewald, Crystal Nicholas, Lexie Shaw, and Jessie Vetter (x2)

WCHA record notes:

=== Minnesota Golden Gophers ===
Records valid through 2022–23 Minnesota Golden Gophers women's ice hockey season.

Career

- Most goaltender wins (114)
- Most goaltender shutouts (43)
- Most goaltender saves (3,250)
- Most saves per game (23.38)
- 2nd best save percentage (.946)
- 3rd best goals against average (1.34)

Season

- Most goaltender wins (38), 2012–13 – tied for first with Amanda Leveille (2013–14)

- 3rd most goaltender wins (33), 2011–12
- 8th most goaltender wins (25), 2010–11 (Note: Tied with Sidney Peters (2016–17))

- Most saves (957), 2010–11

- 2nd most saves (854), 2011–12
- 5th most saves (776), 2012–13
- 10th most saves (663), 2009–10

- Most saves per game (27.34), 2010–11

- 3rd most saves per game (25.50), 2009–10

- Most shutouts (17), 2012–13

- 3rd most shutouts (10), 2011–12 (Note: Tied with Amanda Leveille (2015–16))
- 5th most shutouts (9), 2010–11
- 9th most shutouts (7), 2009–10 (Note: Tied with four other goaltenders: Brittony Chartier (2005–06), Erica Killewald (1998–99), Crystal Nicholas (1998–99), and Skylar Vetter (2022–23))

- Best save percentage (.956), 2012–13

- 2nd best save percentage (.948), 2009–10
- 10th best save percentage (.942), 2011–12 (Note: Tied with Amanda Leveille (2015–16))

- 2nd best goals against average (0.96), 2012–13

- 9th best goals against average (1.33), 2009–10
- 10th best goals against average (1.35), 2011–12

Single-game

- Most saves (51), Minnesota vs. Wisconsin on March 5, 2011 – tied for first with Erica Killewald (12 February 2000)

- 3rd most saves (50), Minnesota vs. North Dakota on 16 March 2013
- 4th most saves (46), Minnesota at Wisconsin on 28 January 2011
- 7th most saves (42), Minnesota vs. Wisconsin on 18 March 2012 (Note: Tied with Brenda Reinen (18 January 2002))
- 9th most saves (41), Minnesota vs. Minnesota State on 27 February 2010 (Note: Tied with Erica Killewald (27 March 1999), Jody Horak (19 January 2002), and Makayla Pahl (30 January 2021))

Minnesota record notes:
