= Karoliina Rantamäki Award =

Finnish ice hockey award

Karoliina Rantamäki -palkinto
- Sport: Ice hockey
- League: Auroraliiga
- Competition: Aurora Borealis Cup Playoffs
- Awarded for: MVP
- English name: Karoliina Rantamäki Award or Karoliina Rantamäki Trophy
- Country: Finland
- Presented by: Finnish Ice Hockey Association

History
- First award: 2000
- First winner: Kati Kovalainen, 2000
- Most wins: Karoliina Rantamäki (3)
- Most recent: Minttu Tuominen, 2025

The Karoliina Rantamäki Award (Finnish: Karoliina Rantamäki -palkinto, lit. 'Karoliina Rantamäki trophy') is an ice hockey trophy awarded by the Finnish Ice Hockey Association to the most valuable player (MVP) of the Auroraliiga playoffs. The Naisten SM-sarja Playoff MVP trophy was first awarded in the 1999–2000 season and the first recipient was forward Kati Kovalainen of Espoo Blues Naiset.

The most Karoliina Rantamäki Awards won by a single player is three, a record fittingly held by Kiekko-Espoo player Karoliina Rantamäki. Rantamäki was recognized as the Naisten SM-sarja Playoff MVP in 2001, 2005, and 2007, all while playing with the Espoo Blues. The award was named after Rantamäki in the 2010–11 season. Of the ten players with Auroraliiga trophies named in their honor, Rantamäki is the only player to hold the most wins of her eponymous award; she also holds the record for most Marianne Ihalainen Awards, with six, and most Tiia Reima Awards, with eight.

The Karoliina Rantamäki Award correlates with post-retirement coaching positions more than any other Auroraliiga award; of the thirteen retired players who won the award during their playing careers, eight have held or currently hold coaching positions: Maija Hassinen-Sullanmaa (2006), Sanna Lankosaari (2002), Linda Leppänen (née Välimäki; 2010, 2014), Isabella Laiho (née Portnoj; 2015), and Minttu Tuominen (2025) in the Auroraliiga; Riikka Sallinen (née Nieminen, previously Välilä; 2016) in the Swedish Women's Hockey League (SDHL); Mira Jalosuo (2017) in the Professional Women's Hockey League (PWHL) and NCAA Division I in women's ice hockey; and Noora Räty in the Chinese Women's Ice Hockey League (WCIHL), NCAA Division I in women's ice hockey, and NCAA Division III in men's ice hockey.

== Award winners ==
Year	Winner	Team	Pos.
2000	Kati Kovalainen	Blues	F
2001	Karoliina Rantamäki	Blues	F
2002	Sanna Lankosaari	IHK	F
2003	Heidi Wiik	Blues	G
2004	Heidi Wiik	Blues	G
2005	Karoliina Rantamäki	Blues	F
2006	Maija Hassinen	Ilves	G
2007	Karoliina Rantamäki	Blues	F
2008	Noora Räty	Blues	G
2009	Noora Räty	Blues	G
2010	Linda Välimäki	Ilves	F
2011	Annina Rajahuhta	HPK	F
2012	Susanna Airaksinen	Kärpät	G
2013	Emma Nuutinen	Blues	F
2014	Linda Välimäki	Blues	F
2015	Isabella Portnoj	Blues	G
2016	Riikka Välilä	JYP	F
2017	Mira Jalosuo	Kärpät	D
2018	Johanna Oksman	Kärpät	G
2019	Ida Kuoppala	Espoo (L)	F
2020	Playoffs cancelled due to COVID-19 pandemic		
2021	Tiia Pajarinen	K-Espoo	G
2022	Nelli Laitinen	K-Espoo	D
2023	Sanni Vanhanen	HIFK	F
2024	Clara Rozier	HIFK	F
2025	Minttu Tuominen	K-Espoo	D

Source: Jääkiekkokirja 2021, Elite Prospects

== All time award recipients ==
Player	Wins	Year(s) won
Karoliina Rantamäki	3	2001, 2005, 2007
Noora Räty	2	2008, 2009
Linda Välimäki	2	2010, 2014
Heidi Wiik	2	2003, 2004
Susanna Airaksinen	1	2012
Maija Hassinen	1	2006
Mira Jalosuo	1	2017
Kati Kovalainen	1	2000
Ida Kuoppala	1	2019
Nelli Laitinen	1	2022
Sanna Lankosaari	1	2002
Emma Nuutinen	1	2013
Johanna Oksman	1	2018
Tiia Pajarinen	1	2021
Isabella Portnoj	1	2015
Annina Rajahuhta	1	2011
Clara Rozier	1	2024
Minttu Tuominen	1	2025
Sanni Vanhanen	1	2023
Riikka Välilä	1	2016
