= Hannu Saintula Award =

Finnish ice hockey award

Hannu Saintula Award Hannu Saintula -palkinto (Finnish)
- Sport: Ice hockey
- League: Auroraliiga
- Awarded for: Coach of the Year
- Presented by: Finnish Ice Hockey Association

History
- Most wins: Sami Haapanen (3)
- Most recent: Marko Peltoniemi, 2026

The Hannu Saintula Award (Finnish: Hannu Saintula -palkinto) is a seasonal ice hockey trophy awarded by the Finnish Ice Hockey Association to the Auroraliiga Coach of the Year.

It is named after Hannu Saintula and was first awarded in the 2010–11 season.

== Award winners ==
| Season | Winner | Team |
|---|---|---|
| 2011–12 | Seppo Karjalainen (1) | Kärpät Oulu |
| 2012–13 | Kai Jansson (1) | Espoo Blues |
| 2013–14 | Sami Haapanen (1) | Espoo Blues |
| 2014–15 | Katja Saari (1) | JYP Jyväskylä |
| 2015–16 | Katja Saari (2) | JYP Jyväskylä |
| 2016–17 | Mira Kuisma (1) | Kärpät Oulu |
| 2017–18 | Jari Risku (1) | Team Kuortane |
| 2018–19 | Sami Haapanen (2) | Espoo Blues |
| 2019–20 | Marjo Voutilainen (1) | KalPa Kuopio |
| 2020–21 | Saara Niemi (1) | IFK Helsinki |
| 2021–22 | Sami Haapanen (3) | Kiekko-Espoo |
| 2022–23 | Saara Niemi (2) | IFK Helsinki |
| 2023–24 | Jari Risku (2) | HPK Hãmeenlinna |
| 2024–25 | Juuso Nieminen (1) | Team Kuortane |
| 2025–26 | Marko Peltoniemi (1) | HPK Hãmeenlinna |

Source: Elite Prospects
