= Ida Kuoppala =

Finnish ice hockey player (born 2000)

- Born: 17 February 2000 (age 26) Jakobstad, Finland
- Height: 1.68 m (5 ft 6 in)
- Position: Left winger
- Shoots: Left
- SDHL team Former teams: Skellefteå AIK; Vaasan Sport; Espoo Blues
- National team: Finland
- Playing career: 2018–present
Medal record
World Championship
| Bronze medal – third place | 2025 Czechia |

Ida Kuoppala (born 17 February 2000) is a Finnish professional ice hockey player for Skellefteå AIK of the Swedish Women's Hockey League (SDHL) and a member of Finland women's national ice hockey team. She previously played for Vaasan Sport Naiset. She played college ice hockey at Maine.

== Playing career ==
Kuoppala began her ice hockey career for Vaasan Sport. During the 2018–19 she recorded 18 goals and two assists in 18 regular season games and was named the Noora Räty Award winner as rookie of the year. She was then loaned to the Espoo Blues for the playoffs, where she recorded six goals and seven assists in six games to help the Blues win the Aurora Borealis Cup. She was subsequently named the Karoliina Rantamäki Award winner as playoffs MVP.

She began her collegiate career for Maine during the 2019–20 season. During her rookie year she led the team in scoring with 19 goals and 14 assists in 35 games. Following the season she was named a unanimous Hockey East All-Rookie team honoree, and named to the All-USCHO Rookie Team. Her 33 points were the fourth most points by a rookie in program history.

During the 2020–21 season, in her sophomore year, she led the team in scoring with ten goals and five assists in 16 games, in a season that was shortened due to the COVID-19 pandemic. During the 2021–22 season, in her junior year, she led the team in scoring with ten goals and 14 assists in 35 games. During the 2022–23 season, in her senior year, she recorded seven goals and eight assists in 35 games. During the 2023–24 season, as a graduate student, she recorded 21 goals and 18 assists in 35 games. Following the season she was named to the Hockey East All-First team and Hockey East scoring champion.

She finished her collegiate career with 67 goals and 59 assists in 156 games. Her 126 career points are the second-most in program history, three points shy of Tereza Vanišová's record of 129 points. On 13 June 2024, she signed with Skellefteå AIK of the SDHL. During the 2024–25 season, she recorded 13 goals and 11 assists in 32 games.

== International play ==
On 26 March 2025, Kuoppala was selected to represent Finland at the 2025 IIHF Women's World Championship.

On 2 January 2026, she was named to Finland's roster to compete at the 2026 Winter Olympics.

== Career statistics ==
=== Regular season and playoffs ===
| | | | Regular season | | | | | Playoffs |
| Season | Team | League | GP | G | A | Pts | PIM | GP | G | A | Pts | PIM |
|---|---|---|---|---|---|---|---|---|---|---|---|---|
| 2018–19 | Vaasan Sport | NSML | 21 | 7 | 5 | 12 | 6 | — | — | — | — | — |
| 2018–19 | Espoo Blues | NSML | — | — | — | — | — | 6 | 6 | 7 | 13 | 12 |
| 2019–20 | University of Maine | Hockey East | 35 | 19 | 14 | 33 | 6 | — | — | — | — | — |
| 2020–21 | University of Maine | Hockey East | 16 | 10 | 5 | 15 | 0 | — | — | — | — | — |
| 2021–22 | University of Maine | Hockey East | 35 | 10 | 14 | 24 | 4 | — | — | — | — | — |
| 2022–23 | University of Maine | Hockey East | 35 | 7 | 8 | 15 | 4 | — | — | — | — | — |
| 2023–24 | University of Maine | Hockey East | 35 | 21 | 18 | 39 | 4 | — | — | — | — | — |
| 2024–25 | Skellefteå AIK | SDHL | 32 | 13 | 11 | 24 | 6 | 3 | 3 | 1 | 4 | 0 |
| SDHL totals | | | 32 | 13 | 11 | 24 | 6 | 3 | 3 | 1 | 4 | 0 |

=== International ===
| Year | Team | Event | Result | GP | G | A | Pts | PIM |
|---|---|---|---|---|---|---|---|---|
| 2018 | Finland | U18 | 5th | 5 | 0 | 0 | 0 | 6 |
| 2025 | Finland | WC | 3rd place, bronze medalist(s) | 7 | 0 | 2 | 2 | 4 |
| 2026 | Finland | OG | 6th | 5 | 0 | 0 | 0 | 0 |
| Junior totals | | | | 5 | 0 | 0 | 0 | 6 |
| Senior totals | | | | 12 | 0 | 2 | 2 | 4 |

== Awards and honors ==
| Award | Year |
Naisten Liiga
| Noora Räty Award | 2019 |
| Karoliina Rantamäki Award | 2019 |
| Aurora Borealis Cup Champion | 2019 |
College
| Hockey East All-Rookie Team | 2020 |
| Hockey East All-Third Team | 2020 |
| Hockey East All-Second Team | 2021 |
| Hockey East All-First Team | 2024 |
