= Vaasan Sport Naiset =

Former ice hockey team in Vaasa, Finland

- City: Vaasa, Ostrobothnia, Finland
- League: Naisten Liiga
- Founded: 1983
- Folded: 2022
- Home arena: Vaasan Sähkö Areena
- Colours: Red, black, white
- Owner: Vaasan Sportin Juniorit Ry
- Head coach: Susanne Uppgård (2021–22)
- Captain: Pauliina Suoniemi (2021–22)
- Website: Official website

Current uniform
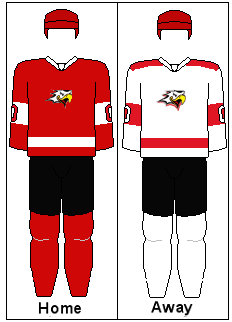

Vaasan Sport Naiset were a women's ice hockey team in Finland. They played in Vaasa, on the west coast of Finland, at the Vaasan Sähkö Areena. Founded in 1983, the team most recently played in the Naisten Liiga from the 2018–19 season until being relegated at the conclusion of the 2021–22 season . The team was dissolved following relegation.

== History ==
The women’s representative team of Vaasan Sport debuted in the Naisten SM-sarja, predecessor of the Naisten Liiga, in the 1983–84 season. Sport quickly established themselves as a competitive team, finishing in the top half of the league during their first five seasons and achieving Finnish Championship bronze in 1986. The 1988–89 season was the first time the team finished in the bottom of the league, ranking seventh of eight teams. Following the disappointing season, the team was financially relegated.

Vaasan Sport gained promotion to the SM-sarja in 1993 but the team struggled with the high level of competition and finished in last place. They were able to stave off relegation in the 1993–94 qualifiers but were unable to do so in the following season and were relegated to the Naisten I-divisioona (renamed Naisten Mestis in 2012) in 1995.

In the following two decades, Vaasan Sport played in either the second-tier I-divisioona or third-tier Naisten II-divisioona (renamed Naisten Suomi-sarja in 2003). The team spent at least seven consecutive seasons in the Suomi-sarja prior to their return to the Mestis in the 2015–16 season. The return to Mestis marked a positive shift in the performance of the team and they continued to markedly improve over the ensuing seasons, culminating in their promotion to the Naisten Liiga for the 2018–19 season.

== Players and personnel ==
=== 2021–22 roster ===
As of 20 December 2021

| No. | Nat | Player | Pos | S/G | Age | Acquired | Birthplace |
|---|---|---|---|---|---|---|---|
| 19 | (Finland) | Alva Eloluoma | D | – | 18 | 2021 | |
| 32 | (Finland) | Sara Erkkilä | D | L | 21 | 2018 | Vaasa, Ostrobothnia, Finland |
| 11 | (Finland) | Fanny Fagerudd | F | L | 23 | 2019 | Pietarsaari, Ostrobothnia, Finland |
| 18 | (Finland) | Meri Haaranoja | D | – | 20 | 2021 | |
| 12 | (Finland) | Wilma Hautamäki | D | L | 22 | 2019 | Pedersöre, Ostrobothnia, Finland |
| 23 | (Finland) | Sanna Karppinen | F | L | 27 | 2021 | |
| 17 | (Finland) | Susanna Kupari (A) | F | L | 26 | 2020 | |
| 26 | (Finland) | Julia Kuusisto | F | L | 19 | 2020 | |
| 13 | (Finland) | Emma-Lotta Laamanen | F | L | 24 | 2021 | |
| 25 | (Finland) | Neea Lehtimäki | D | L | 25 | 2018 | Kiukainen, Satakunta, Finland |
| 20 | (Finland) | Sanna-Lotta Myllyniemi | F | R | 26 | 2018 | Vaasa, Ostrobothnia, Finland |
| 14 | (Finland) | Noora Mylläri (A) | F | L | 26 | 2013 | Vaasa, Ostrobothnia, Finland |
| 30 | (Finland) | Oona Mäki | G | L | 26 | 2019 | Seinäjoki, South Ostrobothnia, Finland |
| 31 | (Finland) | Melisa Mörönen | G | L | 28 | 2018 | Alavus, South Ostrobothnia, Finland |
| 10 | (Finland) | Emma Pitkänen | F | L | 29 | 2014 | Vaasa, Ostrobothnia, Finland |
| 15 | (Finland) | Emma Salpakari | D | R | 26 | 2020 | Suonenjoki, North Savo, Finland |
| 8 | (Finland) | Pauliina Suoniemi (C) | F | L | 35 | 2014 | Tampere, Pirkanmaa, Finland |
| 28 | (Finland) | Mari Tervala | D/F | L | 27 | 2021 | Joensuu, North Karelia, Finland |
| 19 | (Israel) | Lyubov Tokar | F | R | 22 | 2020 | Holon, Tel Aviv, Israel |
| 16 | (Finland) | Kiia Tuovinen (L) | F | L | 23 | 2019 | Haapavesi, North Ostrobothnia, Finland |
| 21 | (Finland) | Susanna Viitala | F | L | 26 | 2019 | Kokkola, Central Ostrobothnia, Finland |
| 7 | (Finland) | Minna Väglund | D | – | 22 | 2020 | |

Coaching staff and team personnel

- Head coach: Susanne Uppgård
- Assistant coach: Juhani Sarilo
- Goaltending coach: Jonathan Iilahti
- Goaltending coach: Vesa Perkiö
- Team manager: Leena Kuusisto
- Equipment managers: Jani Kuusisto & Mika Myllyniemi

=== Team captaincy history ===
- Susanne Uppgård, 2015–2016
- Elina Ojala, 2016–2020
- Pauliina Suoniemi, 2020–2022

=== Head coaches ===
- Ove Kvist, 2013–2017
- Mika Nummi, 2017–2019
- Marko Haapala, 2019–1 December 2020
- Susanne Uppgård, 1 December 2020 – 2022

== Team honours ==
=== Finnish Championship ===
- (bronze) Naisten SM-sarja Third Place (1): 1986

== Notable alumni ==
Years active with Sport listed alongside players' names.

- Sari Krooks, 1983–1989 & 1993–94
- Hanna Hakala, 1986–1988
- Tiina Suominen, 1986–1988
- Ida Kuoppala, 2017–2019
