= Pauliina Suoniemi =

Finnish ice hockey player

- Born: 24 March 1991 (age 35) Tampere, Pirkanmaa, Finland
- Height: 1.69 m (5 ft 7 in)
- Weight: 65 kg (143 lb; 10 st 3 lb)
- Position: Centre
- Shoots: Left
- NSML team: Vaasan Sport
- Playing career: 2009–present

Pauliina Suoniemi (born 24 March 1991) is a Finnish ice hockey player and captain of Vaasan Sport Naiset of the Naisten Liiga (NSML). She is Vaasan Sport's all-time career leader in assists and ranks fifth in points.
