= Lappi Areena =

Indoor arena in Rovaniemi, Finland

Coordinates: 66.49609°N 25.77180°E

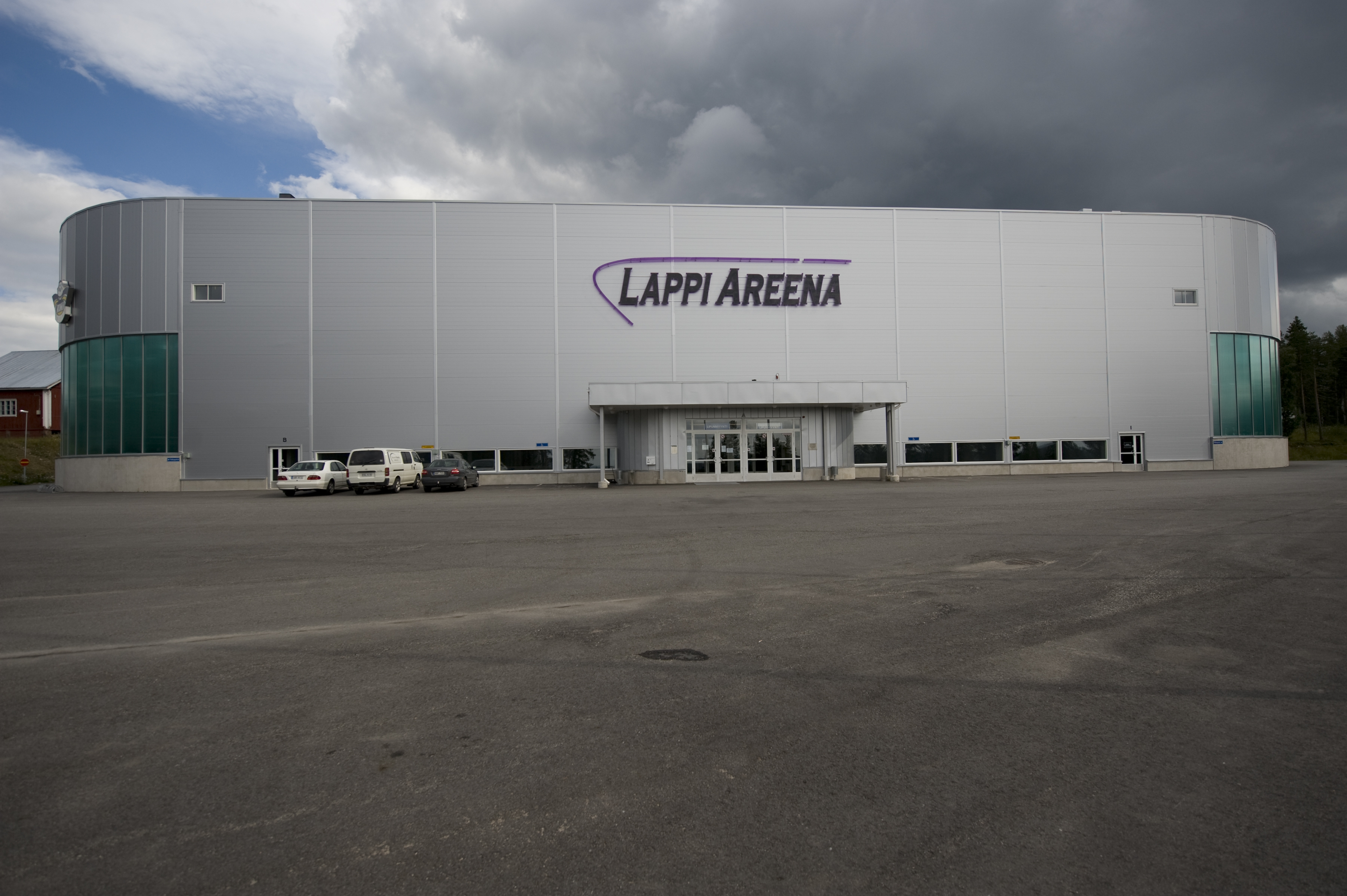
- Interactive map of Lappi Areena
- Location: Rovaniemi, Finland
- Capacity: 5500

Construction
- Opened: 2003

Tenant
- RoKi

Lappi Areena is a multi-purpose indoor arena in Rovaniemi, Finland which hold concerts, trade fairs and sporting events particularly ice hockey. The arena was built in 2003 and has a capacity of 4780 people for concerts and 3500 for ice hockey matches.

Lappi Areena mainly serves ice sports such as ice hockey and figure skating but also can host volleyball. It is the home arena for RoKi of the Mestis hockey league the second top league in Finland behind Liiga.

== See also ==
- List of indoor arenas in Finland
- List of indoor arenas in Nordic countries
