= Vaasa Arena =

Arena in Vaasa, Finland

- Vaasan Sähkö Areena (Finnish); Vasa Elektriska Arena (Swedish)
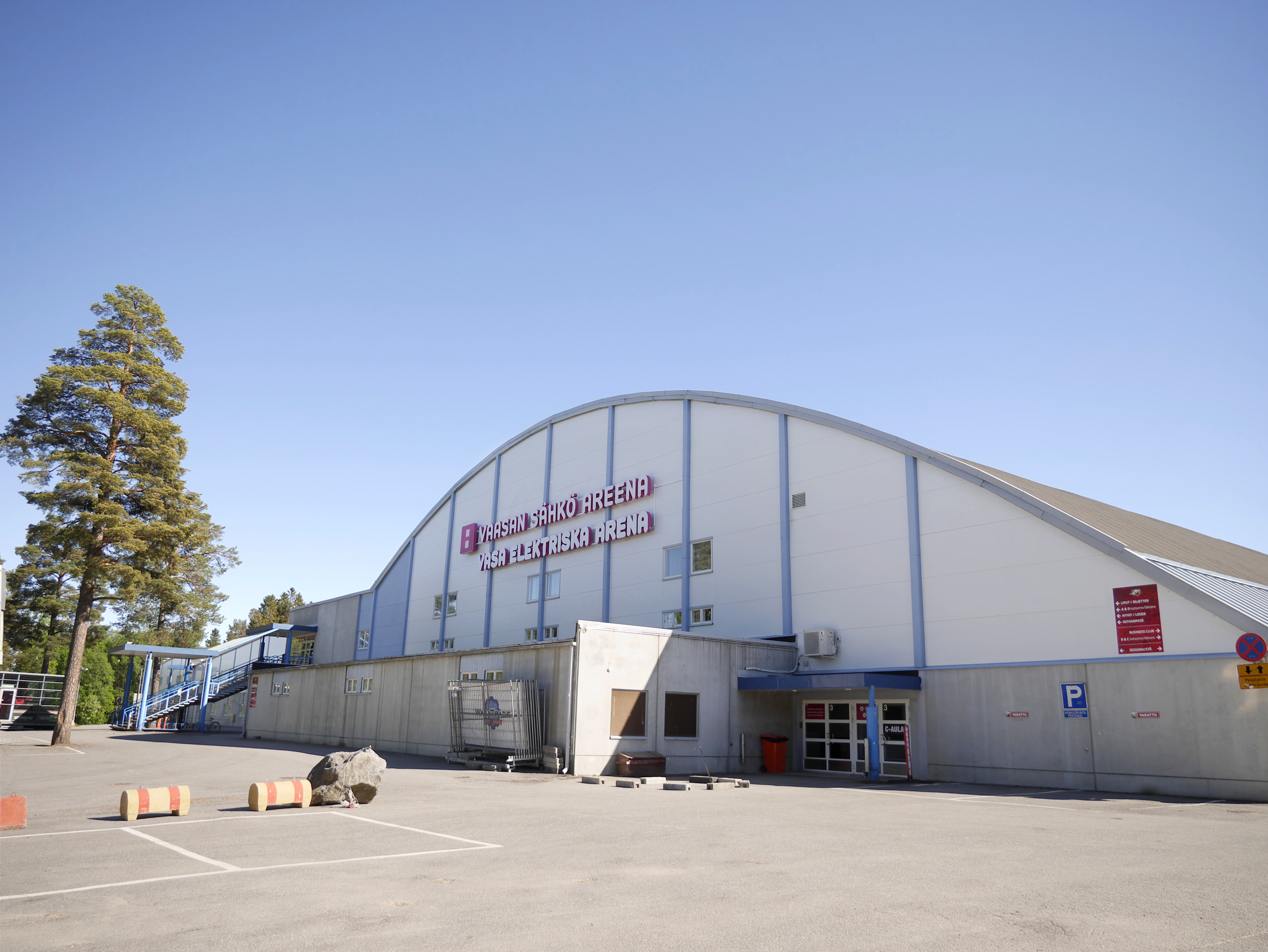
- Interactive map of Vaasa Arena
- Former names: Kuparisaaren jäähalli
- Address: Rinnakkaistie 2
- Location: Vaasa, Finland
- Coordinates: 63°04′47″N 21°38′30″E
- Owner: Vaasa, 84% Korsholm, 16%
- Operator: Vaasa Region Arenas Federation
- Capacity: 5,200
- Surface: Concrete, ice
- Record attendance: 5,200 (17.2.2024, Sport-Ilves)
- Field size: 58 x 28 m (ice surface)

Construction
- Opened: 1971
- Renovated: 2012, 2016, 2020

Tenants
- Vaasan Sport (since 1971); Mighty Cocks (since 2023); KoMu HT (since 1983); Waasa Red Ducks (2009–2015)

Vaasan Sähkö Areena (Swedish: Vasa Elektriska Arena, Vaasa Energy Arena) is a multipurpose arena in Vaasa, Finland. It was previously called the Kuparisaaren jäähalli (Copper Island Ice Rink) and locals often use the old name in conversation. The arena first opened in 1971 and has undergone renovation and expansion several times. It is located approximately three kilometres (roughly two miles) south-east of downtown Vaasa.

== Use ==
The arena is principally used for ice hockey and serves as home ice to premier-level teams Vaasan Sport of the Liiga and Vaasan Sport Naiset of the Naisten Liiga, as well as Korsholm-Mustasaari Hockey Team (KoMu HT) which plays in the fourth-tier II Divisioona. Vaasa Arena features four ice surfaces, making it the only four-rink arena in Finland. The main arena has a seating capacity of 3,957 for hockey games and is used for all of Vaasan Sport’s home games. The three other pads of ice serve as training rinks, hosting most of the games for Vaasan Sport Naiset, KoMu HT, and other teams and junior organizations, but there is limited area for spectators. The training rink facilities are also made available to the public on a regular schedule.

In addition, the figure skating club Vaasan Luistinkerho (VLK, Swedish: Vasa Skrinnskoklubb) and the synchronized skating club Wasa Team Skaters use the facilities at Vaasa Arena. The arena facilities are also used for rink bandy, curling, and various ball sports. The main arena is used for exhibitions and concerts.

== Ownership and operations ==
Vaasa Arena is managed by the Vaasanseudun Areenat Kuntayhtymän (Swedish: Vasaregionens Arenor Samkommun, Vaasa Region Arenas Federation), which is owned by the city of Vaasa and the municipality of Korsholm. Vaasa owns an 84% share of the Vaasa Arena property and Korsholm owns the remaining 16%.

== Expansion and renovation project, 2018–2020 ==
On 17 December 2017, twelve people sustained minor injuries (seven requiring hospital visits) when an HVAC duct and lighting rail fell from the ceiling of the main arena during a Raskasta Joulua concert attended by 3,100 spectators. Two days later, on 19 December 2017, the Vaasa City Council approved a budget for the renovation of Vaasa Arena, including the replacement of the main arena’s wood-arch roof structure. A total of eight million Euros over three years was allocated for the project, with the city of Vaasa contributing half of the project costs and Mustasaari contributing just under 25%. Building permits for the project were approved in June 2018.

Renovations broke ground in April 2020, with the deconstruction of the main arena's old roof structure to make way for the construction of a new metal-trussed roof. Other elements include a new restaurant area, totally new outer walls on three sides, and an increase of the maximum capacity to approximately 5,000 for ice hockey events. Renovations were scheduled to be completed by 30 September 2020, but the project was slightly delayed by the COVID-19 pandemic and the arena construction completion date was pushed to October 2020. Prior to the pandemic, the first Liiga match in the updated building was set to be played on 10 October 2020.

== Pictures ==
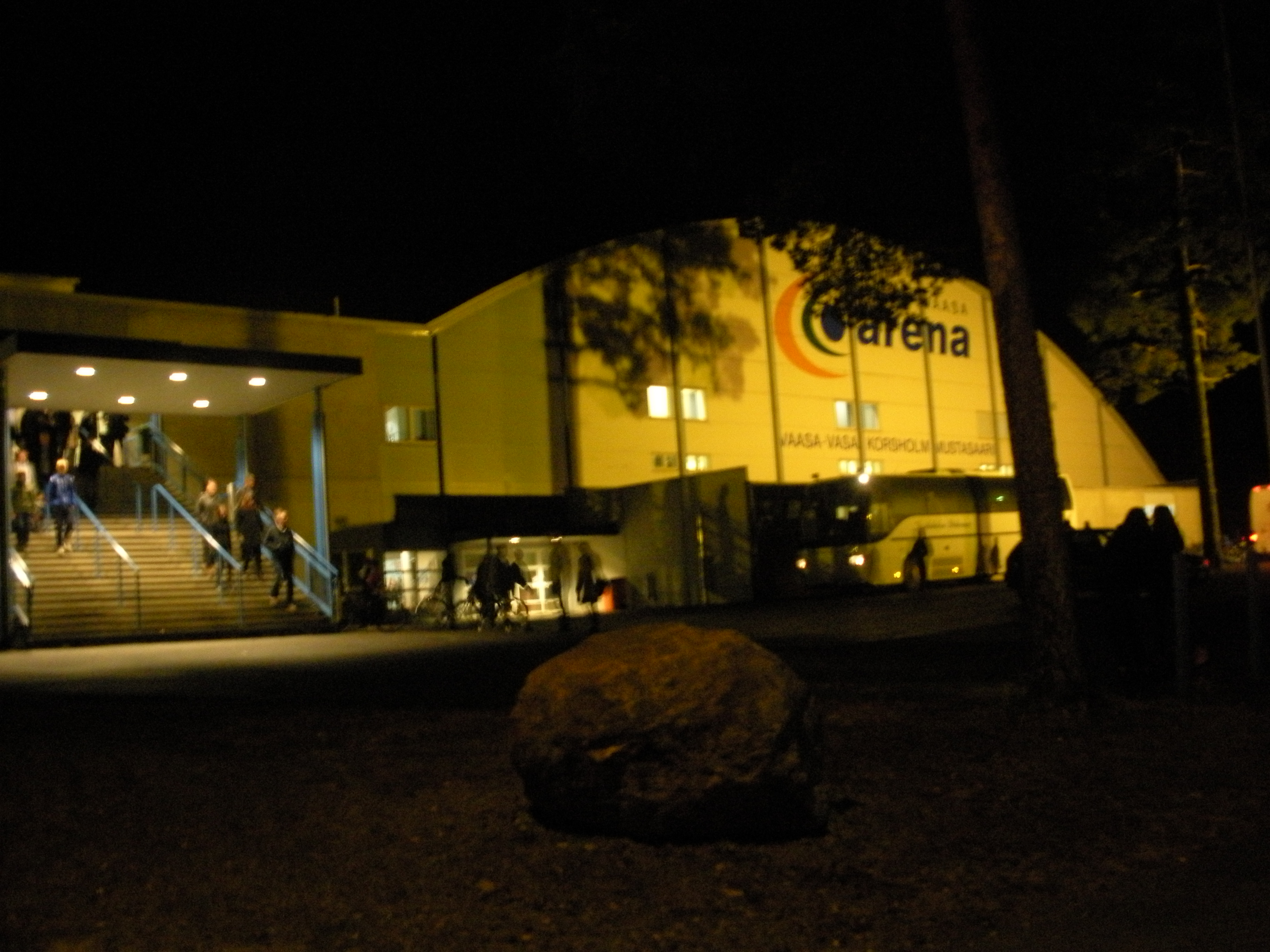
Vaasa Arena by night, 2010.

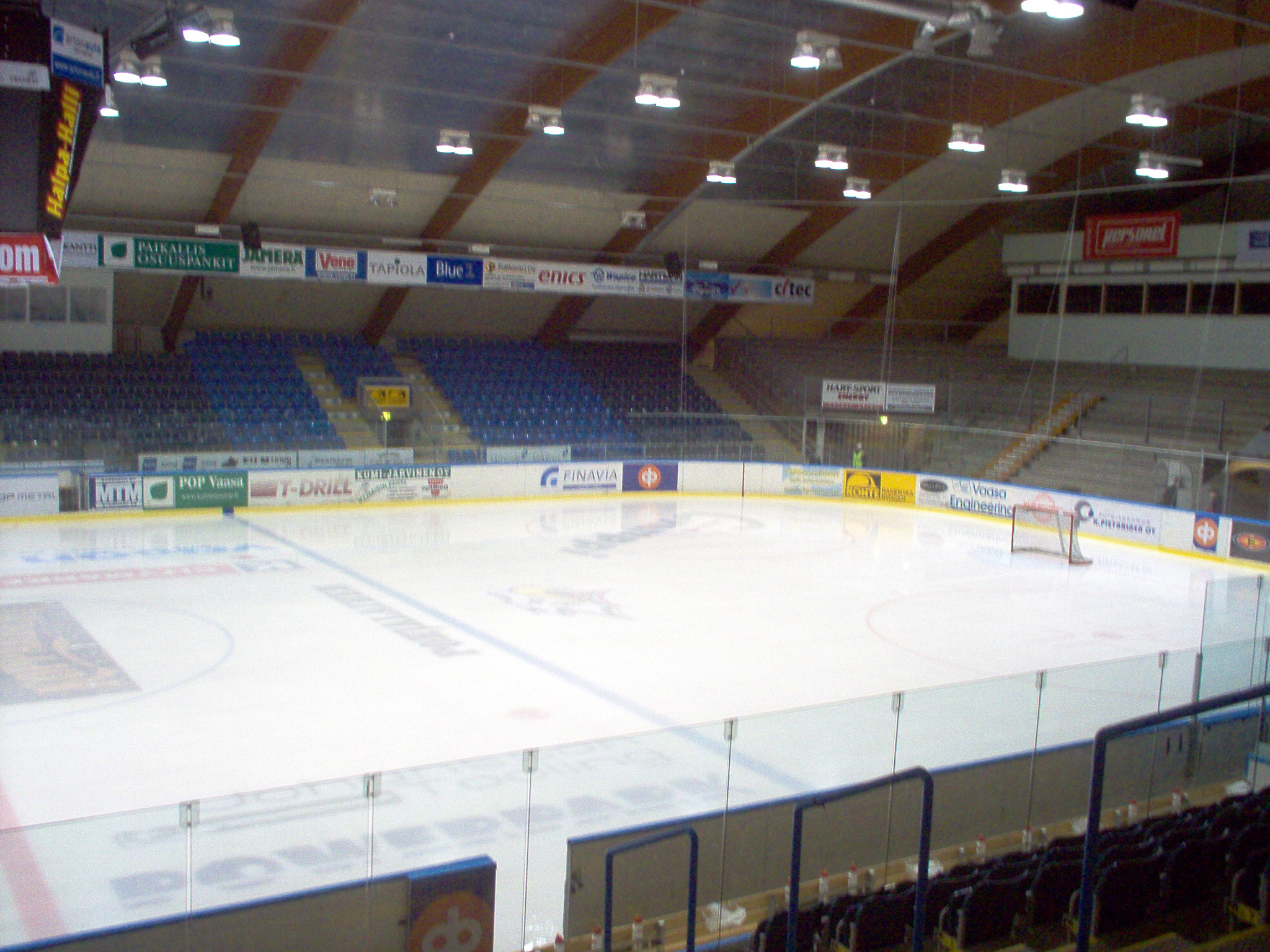
Interior view of the main arena, 2007.

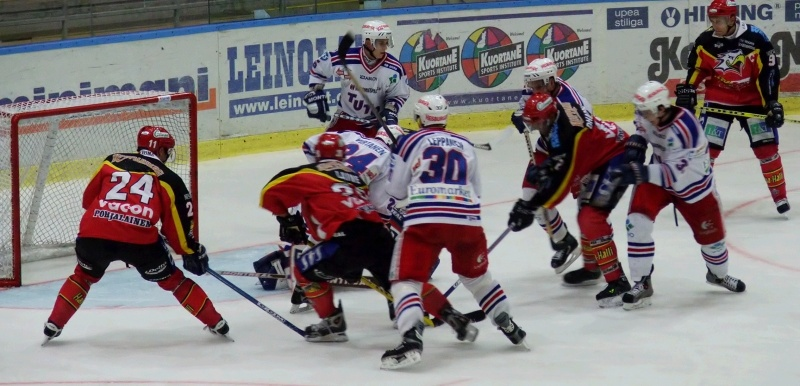
Sport home game against TuTo, 2007.
