= Turkish Women's Ice Hockey League =

Turkish Women's Ice Hockey League Kadınlar Süper Ligi
- Sport: Ice hockey
- Founded: 2006
- Founder: TBHF
- First season: 2006–07
- No. of teams: 6
- Country: Turkey
- Most recent champion: Buzadam (2022–23)
- Most titles: Milenyum Paten SK (6)
- International cup: European Women's Champions Cup
- Website: tbhf.org.tr

Kadınlar Süper Ligi (lit. 'Women's Super League'), also known as the Turkish Women's Ice Hockey League (Turkish: Türkiye Buz Hokeyi Kadınlar Ligi) and as TBHF Kadınlar Ligi, is an amateur ice hockey league in Turkey. It was founded by the Turkish Ice Hockey Federation (TBHF) in 2006.

Each team is allowed to carry two import players per season. The season typically starts in late November or early December and finishes in April.

The champion of the league qualified for the IIHF European Women's Champions Cup until the tournament was discontinued in 2015.

== Teams ==
=== 2023–24 season ===
| Club | Abbreviation(s) | District | City |
|---|---|---|---|
| Buzadam Gençlik ve Spor Kulübü | Buz Adamlar [GSK], Buzadam | Fatih | Istanbul |
| Çayyolu Gordion Spor Kulübü | Çayyolu Gordion [SK] | Yenimahalle | Ankara |
| Genç Ankaralılar Spor Kulübü | GASK | Çankaya | Ankara |
| İstanbul Büyükşehir Belediyesi Spor Kulübü | İstanbul BB[SK], İBB[SK] | Sultangazi | Istanbul |
| Narman Spor Kulübü | NarmanSpor, Narman [SK] | Narman | Erzurum |
| Zeytinburnu Belediyesi Spor Kulübü | Zeytinburnu | Zeytinburnu | Istanbul |

== Past seasons ==
=== 2009–10 season ===
The 2009–10 season consisted of 11 teams split up into three groups. Groups A and B were classified as Orta (lit. 'Central') and comprised teams from Ankara. Group C was called Marmara + Doğu (lit. 'Marmara Region + East') and comprised teams from Istanbul, İzmit, and Erzurum.

Group A – Orta

| Club | Home town | Arena |
|---|---|---|
| Milenyum Paten SK | Ankara | Bel-Pa |
| Başkent Yıldızları SK | Ankara | Bel-Pa |
| Ankara University SK | Ankara | Bel-Pa |
| ABBA SK | Ankara | Bel-Pa |

Group B – Orta

| Club | Home town | Arena |
|---|---|---|
| Polis Akademisi SK | Ankara | Bel-Pa |
| ODTÜ Spor Kulübü | Ankara | Bel-Pa |
| Truva Paten SK | Ankara | Bel-Pa |
| Başkent İl Müdürlüğü SK | Ankara | Bel-Pa |

Group C – Marmara + Doğu

| Club | Home town | Arena |
|---|---|---|
| ATAK SK | Istanbul | Istanbul Ice Arena |
| Erzurum Gençlik SK | Erzurum | Erzurum GSIM Ice Arena |
| Erzurum Polis Gücü SK | Erzurum | Erzurum GSIM Ice Arena |
| Kocaeli B.B. Kağıt | Izmit | Kocaeli Ice Rink |

=== 2014–15 season ===
Five teams competed in the 2014–15 season. Narmanspor finished the season champion defeating Milenyum Paten SK in the playoffs.

| Club | Home town |
|---|---|
| Ankara University SK | Ankara |
| Buz Korsanları | Istanbul |
| Genç Ankaralılar SK | Ankara |
| Milenyum Paten SK | Ankara |
| Narmanspor | Erzurum |

Season awards

- Best Goaltender: Kübra Dadaşoğlu, Narmanspor
- Best Defenceman: İlkim Dilan Uygun, Milenyum Paten SK
- Best Forward: Betül Taygar, Narmanspor

=== 2015–16 season ===
The 2015–16 TBHF Women's League was played with seven teams. From the previous season, Milenyum Paten SK did not participated. The teams ODTÜ SK from Ankara, Pars SK and Zeytinburnu Belediyesi SK from Istanbul joined the league.

The league champion became Istanbul-based Buz Korsanları defeating Narmanspor by 3–2 in the play-offs.

| Club | Home town |
|---|---|
| Ankara University SK | Ankara |
| Buz Korsanları | Istanbul |
| Genç Ankaralılar SK | Ankara |
| Narmanspor | Erzurum |
| ODTÜ SK | Ankara |
| Pars SK | Istanbul |
| Zeytinburnu Belediyesi SK | Istanbul |

== Champions ==
| Season | Champion | Runner up |
|---|---|---|
| 2006–07 | Polis Akademisi ve Koleji | Kocaeli B.B. Kağıt SK |
| 2007–08 | Polis Akademisi ve Koleji | Milenyum Paten SK |
| 2008–09 | Milenyum Paten SK | Polis Akademisi ve Koleji |
| 2009–10 | Milenyum Paten SK | Ankara University SK |
| 2010–11 | Milenyum Paten SK | GSIM Başkent SK |
| 2011–12 | Milenyum Paten SK | GSIM Başkent SK |
| 2012–13 | Milenyum Paten SK | GASK |
| 2013–14 | Milenyum Paten SK | Narmanspor |
| 2014–15 | Narmanspor | Milenyum Paten SK |
| 2015–16 | Buz Korsanları | Narmanspor |
| 2016–17 | Narmanspor | Buz Korsanları |
| 2017–18 | Buz Korsanları | Narmanspor |
| 2018–19 | Buz Korsanları | Buzadam |
| 2019–20 | Buzadam | GASK |
| 2020–21 | Buzadam | Buz Beykoz |
| 2021–22 | Çayyolu Gordion | Buzadam |
| 2022–23 | Buzadam | İstanbul BBSK |

== IIHF European Women's Champions Cup ==
2007–08 EWCC Group B

2006–07 League champion Büyükşehir Belediyesi Ankara Spor Kulübü played in the first round of the 2007–08 IIHF European Women's Champions Cup Group B held on October 5–7, 2007, in Martin, Slovakia. The winner of each group qualifies for the next round.

| Team | Country | W | L | PTS |
|---|---|---|---|---|
| MHK Martin | (Slovakia) | 2 | 0 | 7 |
| Terme Maribor | (Slovenia) | 2 | 1 | 6 |
| SHK Laima Riga | (Latvia) | 1 | 1 | 5 |
| B.B. Ankara SK | (Turkey) | 0 | 3 | 0 |

2008–09 EWCC Group A

2007–08 League champion Polis Akademisi ve Koleji played in the first round of the 2008–09 IIHF European Women's Champions Cup Group A held on October 24–26, 2008, in Prague, Czech Republic. The winner of each group qualifies for the next round.

| Team | Country | W | L | PTS |
|---|---|---|---|---|
| HC Slavia Praha | (Czech Republic) | 3 | 0 | 9 |
| Terme Maribor | (Slovenia) | 2 | 1 | 6 |
| Polis Akademisi ve Koleji | (Turkey) | 1 | 2 | 3 |
| Ferencvárosi TC | (Hungary) | 0 | 3 | 0 |

2009–10 EWCC Group C

2008–09 League champion Milenyum Paten SK traveled to Prague, Czech Republic to compete in the first round of the 2009–10 IIHF European Women's Champions Cup Group C from October 30 to November 1, 2009. The winner of each group qualifies for the next round.

| Team | Country | W | L | PTS |
|---|---|---|---|---|
| HC Slavia Praha | (Czech Republic) | 3 | 0 | 9 |
| Terme Maribor | (Slovenia) | 2 | 1 | 6 |
| MHK Martin | (Slovakia) | 1 | 2 | 3 |
| Milenyum Paten SK | (Turkey) | 0 | 3 | 0 |

2010–11 EWCC Group B

2009–10 League champion Milenyum Paten SK hosted the first round of the 2010–11 IIHF European Women's Champions Cup Group B held on October 29–31, 2014. The winner of each group qualifies for the next round.

| Team | Country | W | L | PTS |
|---|---|---|---|---|
| Aisulu Almaty | (Kazakhstan) | 3 | 0 | 9 |
| Brûleurs de Loups | (France) | 2 | 1 | 6 |
| Terme Maribor | (Slovenia) | 1 | 1 | 3 |
| Milenyum Paten SK | (Turkey) | 0 | 3 | 0 |

2011–12 EWCC Group B

2010–11 League champion Milenyum Paten SK played in the first round of the 2011–12 IIHF European Women's Champions Cup Group B held on October 28–30, 2011, in Miercurea Ciuc, Romania. The winner of each group qualifies for the next round.

| Team | Country | W | L | PTS |
|---|---|---|---|---|
| Brûleurs de Loups | (France) | 3 | 0 | 9 |
| HK Pantera Minsk | (Belarus) | 2 | 1 | 6 |
| HSC Csíkszereda | (Romania) | 1 | 2 | 3 |
| Milenyum Paten SK | (Turkey) | 0 | 3 | 0 |

2012–13 EWCC Group B

2011–12 League champion Milenyum Paten SK played in the first round of the 2012–13 IIHF European Women's Champions Cup Group B held on October 19–21, 2012, in Molodechno, Belarus. The winner of each group qualifies for the next round.

| Team | Country | W | L | PTS |
|---|---|---|---|---|
| Aisulu Almaty | (Kazakhstan) | 3 | 0 | 9 |
| HK Pantera Minsk | (Belarus) | 2 | 1 | 6 |
| SC Miercurea Ciuc | (Romania) | 1 | 2 | 3 |
| Milenyum Paten SK | (Turkey) | 0 | 3 | 0 |

2014–15 EWCC Group A

2013–14 League champion Milenyum Paten SK hosted the first round of the 2014–15 IIHF European Women's Champions Cup Group A held on October 17–19, 2014. The winner of each group qualifies for the next round.

| Team | Country | W | L | PTS |
|---|---|---|---|---|
| HK Poprad | (Slovakia) | 3 | 0 | 9 |
| Aisulu Almaty | (Kazakhstan) | 2 | 1 | 6 |
| Milenyum Paten SK | (Turkey) | 1 | 2 | 3 |
| SC Miercurea Ciuc | (Romania) | 0 | 3 | 0 |

== See also ==
- Turkey national women's ice hockey team
- Turkish Ice Hockey Super League
- Turkish Ice Hockey First League
