= Terhi Mertanen =

Finnish ice hockey player and coach

- Born: 4 April 1981 (age 45) Joensuu, Finland
- Height: 1.65 m (5 ft 5 in)
- Weight: 76 kg (168 lb; 12 st 0 lb)
- Position: Defence
- Shot: Left
- Played for: KalPa Kuopio; Kärpät Oulu; ZSC Lions; Espoo Blues; RoKi Rovaniemi
- National team: Finland
- Playing career: 1999–2019
Medal record
Olympic Games
| Bronze medal – third place | 2010 Vancouver | Team |
World Championship
| Bronze medal – third place | 2011 Switzerland |
| Bronze medal – third place | 2004 Canada |

Terhi Eveliina Mertanen (born 4 April 1981) is a Finnish retired ice hockey defenceman and current head coach of TPS Naiset in the Naisten Liiga. She was a member of the Finnish national ice hockey team for thirteen seasons and won bronze medals in the women's ice hockey tournament at the 2010 Winter Olympics and at the IIHF Women's World Championships in 2004 and 2011.

== Playing career ==
Mertanen developed in the youth system of Jokipojat in her hometown of Joensuu, North Karelia, in western Finland. She played fourteen seasons in the Naisten SM-sarja (renamed Naisten Liiga in 2017) with KalPa Kuopio, Kärpät Oulu, and the Espoo Blues. With the Blues, she was a four-time Finnish Champion (2002, 2009, 2013, and 2015) and medaled at three IIHF European Women's Champions Cups, winning bronze in 2009 and 2015 and silver in 2010.

Outside of Finland, Mertanen played in the Leistungsklasse A (LKA/LNA) with the ZSC Lions Frauen, the women's team of the ZSC Lions, during the 2011 playoffs and for the entirety of the 2011–12 season. With ZSC she won a silver medal at the 2012 IIHF European Women's Champions Cup.

== Career statistics ==
=== International ===
| Year | Team | Event | Result | GP | G | A | Pts | PIM |
|---|---|---|---|---|---|---|---|---|
| 2001 | Finland | WW | 4th | 5 | 0 | 2 | 2 | 6 |
| 2002 | Finland | OG | 4th | 5 | 0 | 1 | 1 | 2 |
| 2004 | Finland | WW | 3rd place, bronze medalist(s) | 5 | 2 | 1 | 3 | 2 |
| 2005 | Finland | WW | 4th | 5 | 1 | 1 | 2 | 2 |
| 2006 | Finland | OG | 4th | 5 | 0 | 0 | 0 | 6 |
| 2010 | Finland | OG | 3rd place, bronze medalist(s) | 5 | 0 | 0 | 0 | 6 |
| 2011 | Finland | WW | 3rd place, bronze medalist(s) | 6 | 0 | 0 | 0 | 4 |
| 2012 | Finland | WW | 4th | 6 | 0 | 3 | 3 | 0 |
| Totals | | | | 42 | 3 | 8 | 11 | 28 |

== See also ==
- List of Olympic women's ice hockey players for Finland
