= Petra Danková =

Slovak ice hockey player

- Born: 18 March 1984 (age 41); Poprad, Czechoslovakia
- Height: 1.64 m (5 ft 5 in)
- Weight: 61 kg (134 lb; 9 st 8 lb)
- Position: Right wing
- TBHBL team Former teams: Narmanspor: HC Slovan Bratislava; HK Poprad
- National team: Slovakia
- Playing career: 2004–present

Petra Danková (born 18 March 1984) is a Slovak women's ice hockey player. Currently, she is a member of Narmanspor team in Erzurum, Turkey playing as right winger.

== Life ==
Danková was born on 18 March 1984 in Poprad. She is 1.64 m (5 ft 4 1/2 in) tall at 61 kg (134 lb).

== Career ==
=== Club ===
Petra Danková was with HC Slovan Bratislava and HK Poprad in her country before she transferred to the Erzurum-based Narmanspor in Turkey to play in the Turkish Women's Ice Hockey League (TBHBL). Her team finished the 2015–16 season as the runners-up.

=== International ===
Between 2004 and 2009, Danková was a member of the Slovakia women's national ice hockey team capping 19 times. She took part at the 2004 IIHF Women's World Championship Div. II in Sterzing, Italy, 2007 WC Div. II in Pyongyang, North Korea, 2008 WC Div. I in Ventspils, Latvia and 2010 Winter Olympics – Women's qualification round matches in Liepāja, Latvia.

== Honors ==
=== Club ===
Turkish Ice Hockey Women's League (TBHBL)

- Runners-up (1): 2015–16 with Narmanspor.
