= Anna Vanhatalo =

Finnish ice hockey and ringette player

Personal information
- Born: 29 February 1984 (age 42) Helsinki, Finland
- Years active: 2002–c. 2013
- Height: 1.78 m (5 ft 10 in)
- Weight: 65 kg (143 lb)
Ice hockey career
- Position: Goaltender
- Caught: Left
- Played for: ZSC Lions; SKIF Nizhny Novgorod; Espoo Blues
- National team: Finland
- Playing career: 2009–c. 2013

Sport
- Country: Finland
- Sport: Ringette
- Position: Goaltender
- Catches: Left
- Team: Team Finland (Sr.); Helsinki Ringette; Montreal Mission
Medal record
Women's ice hockey
Olympic Games
Bronze medal – third place	2010 Vancouver	Ice hockey
IIHF Women's World Championship
Bronze medal – third place	2011 Switzerland
Universiade
Silver medal – second place	2011 Erzurum	Ice hockey
Ringette
World Ringette Championships
Gold medal – first place	2004 Stockholm
Gold medal – first place	2007 Ottawa

Anna Vanhatalo (born 29 February 1984) is a Finnish retired ice hockey and ringette player and former member of the Finnish national ice hockey team and the Finnish national ringette team. Representing Finland, she won a bronze medal in the women's ice hockey tournament at the 2010 Winter Olympics in Vancouver. In 2004 and 2007, she won gold in the World Ringette Championships.

== Ringette career ==
Vanhatalo made her goaltending debut in the premier Finnish ringette league, the Ringeten SM-sarja, at age 18 in 2002. She was a member of the Finnish national ringette team in 2004 and 2007. Vanhatalo won two World Ringette Championships gold medals, one in the 2004 World Ringette Championships held in Stockholm, where she was elected the best goaltender of the tournament, and the other gold medal in the 2007 World Ringette Championships held in Ottawa.

In 2006, Vanhatalo went to Canada to play one season for the Montreal Mission in the National Ringette League. In exchange, her Finnish team, Helsinki Ringette, received Montreal Mission goalkeeper Claudia Jetté.

== Ice hockey career ==
Vanhatalo began playing ice hockey at age 25 in 2009, joining the powerhouse Espoo Blues Naiset in Finland's top league, the Naisten SM-sarja, as their starting goaltender. Her first ice hockey season was a resounding success, she recorded a magnificent .952 save percentage across ten games played in the regular season and backstopped the team to silver medals in the Finnish Championship and the 2010 European Women's Champions Cup. Her performance earned the Tuula Puputti Award in 2010, recognizing her as the Naisten SM-sarja Goaltender of the Year.

The following season, Vanhatalo signed alongside Finnish national team teammate Karoliina Rantamäki as the only expatriates with SKIF Nizhny Novgorod in the Russian Women's Hockey League. Undaunted by the international relocation, Vanhatalo played as the backup to starter Valentina Ostrovlyanchik and maintained her stellar-caliber statistics, ending the season with a .949 save percentage and a solid 1.36 goals against average (GAA) in eight games played.

Unable to continue playing with SKIF due to restrictions placed by the RWHL on the number of import players per team, she opted to play the 2011–12 season in the Swiss Women's Hockey League A (SWHL A) with the ZSC Lions Frauen based in Zürich. Though she split the goal with Canadian-Swiss goaltender Vanessa Clavadetscher during the SWHL A season, she was the starting netminder for the EWHL Super Cup in 2012 and the 2012 European Women's Champions Cup, backstopping the team to silver medal finishes in both tournaments.

Vanhatalo did not play ice hockey in the 2012–13 regular season but she returned to the starting role with the ZSC Lions for the EWHL Super Cup in 2013, contributing a magnificent .970 save percentage and 0.79 GAA to the team's first Super Cup victory. She was also the team's starter for the 2013 European Women's Champions Cup, at which the Lions placed fourth.

=== International play ===
Vanhatalo was selected to the Finnish Olympic team in her first season playing ice hockey. She won a bronze medal in the women's ice hockey tournament at the 2010 Winter Olympics while serving as third goaltender behind starter Noora Räty and backup Mira Kuisma. Representing Finland she also won bronze medals at the 2010 4 Nations Cup and the 2011 IIHF Women's World Championship, and a silver medal in the women's ice hockey tournament at the 2011 Winter Universiade.

== Personal life ==
During her stay in Quebec in 2006, she learned the French language. She is multi-lingual and speaks Finnish, Swedish, German, English and French.

In 2009, she obtained her MBA in marketing from the Helsinki School of Economics. Her thesis examined the motivations of companies when sponsoring women's sports, using ringette as a case study.

== Honors and achievements ==
=== Ice hockey ===
Club competition

- (silver) Silver Medal at the 2009–10 IIHF European Women's Champions Cup with the Espoo Blues
- (silver) Silver Medal in the Finnish Championship in 2010 with the Espoo Blues
- (silver) Silver Medal in the Russian Championship in 2011 with SKIF Nizhny Novgorod
- (silver) Silver Medal at the 2011–12 IIHF European Women's Champions Cup with the ZSC Lions
- (gold) Gold Medal in the Swiss Championship in 2012 with the ZSC Lions
- (silver) Silver Medal at the EWHL Super Cup in 2012 with the ZSC Lions
- EWHL Super Cup champion in 2013 with the ZSC Lions

International competition

- (bronze) Bronze Medal at the 2010 4 Nations Cup
- (bronze) Bronze Medal in the women's ice hockey tournament at the 2010 Winter Olympics
- (silver) Silver Medal in the women's ice hockey tournament at the 2011 Winter Universiade
- (bronze) Bronze Medal at the 2011 IIHF Women's World Championship

=== Ringette ===
- 3x Finnish Champion with Helsinki Ringette
- (gold) Gold Medal in the 2004 World Ringette Championships
- (gold) Gold Medal in the 2007 World Ringette Championships

== See also ==
- List of Olympic women's ice hockey players for Finland
