= Elif Ulaş =

Turkish female figure skater and ice hockey player (born 1986)

- Born: 26 February 1986 (age 40) Ankara, Turkey
- Height: 160 cm (5 ft 3 in)
- Weight: 63 kg (139 lb; 9 st 13 lb)
- Position: Forwatd
- Shoots: R
- TBPKL team: Milenyum Paten
- National team: Turkey

Gamze Elif Ulaş (born 26 February 1986) is a Turkish figure skater and ice hockey player. She represented her country at international figıre skating competitions, and was part of the Turkey women's national ice hockey team.

== Figure skating ==
In 2001, Ulaş came second in the Turkish national junior figure skating championships, then also taking part in international competitions, such as in the Junior Ladies category of the Golden Bear of Zagreb, Croatia and Copenhagen Trophy, Denmark in 2002.

== Ice hockey ==
Ulaş is 1.60 m (5 ft 3 in) tall at 63 kg (139 lb). She played ice hockey as a right-handed forward. She was part of the Milenyum Paten in Ankara.

She was admitted to the first national ice hockey team, which was formed by the Turkish Ice Hockey Federation in 2007, after some time league matches of women's ice hockey were played. She scored the first goal in the history of the Turkey women's national ice hockey team in an official game against Estonia at the 2007 IIHF Women's World Championship Division IV held in Miercurea Ciuc, Romania on 27 March 2007. She was part of the national team at the 2011 Winter Universiade held in Erzurum, Turkey.

== Personal life ==
Born on 26 February 1986, Gamze Elif Ulaş is a native of Ankara, Turkey.

She studied at the Distance Education Faculty (AÖF) of Anadolu University in Eskişehir, Turkey.
