= Italian Hockey League Women =

National championship ice hockey league in Italy

- Most recent season or competition: 2024–25 IHLW season
- Formerly: Serie A Femminile, 1990–2017
- Sport: Ice hockey
- Founded: 1990
- Founder: Federazione Italiana Sport del Ghiaccio
- First season: 1990–91
- No. of teams: 8
- Country: Italy
- Most recent champion: EVB Eagles Südtirol (2024–25)
- Most titles: EVB Eagles Südtirol (14 titles)
- Relegation to: No relegation → relegation to Serie B Femminile between 1999 and 2001
- Related competitions: European Women's Hockey League
- Website: italia.hockey

The Italian Hockey League Women, abbreviated IHLW, is the premier national women's ice hockey league in Italy. It was founded in 1990 by the Federazione Italiana Sport del Ghiaccio as the Serie A Femminile; the present league name was adopted in 2017. The EVB Eagles Südtirol Alto Adige are the most successful team in league history, having won thirteen Italian Championships.

== Teams ==
=== 2024–25 season ===
Team name	Location	Home venue	Head coach	Captain
AHC Lakers	Neumarkt (Egna)	Raiffeisen Arena, Kaltern	L. Pontus Morén	Sarah Engele
EVB Eagles Südtirol	Bolzano (Bozen)	Sparkasse Arena	Stefano Daprà	Emma Cereghini
Girls Project Mastini Devils	Varese	PalaSesto, Sesto	Danilo Bertotto	Rebecca Fiorese
HC 3 Zinnen Dolomites Women	Toblach (Dobbiaco)	Eisstadion Sportzone Gries	Tahnee Wild	Eva Maria Grunser
Piemont Rebelles	Pinerolo	Stadio Olimpico del Ghiaccio	Zdeněk Kudrna	Melissa Di Giovanni
Real Torino HC Femminile	Turin (Torino)	Palaghiaccio Tazzoli	Mirko Bianchi	Eleonora Trombetta
Trentino Women	Cavalese	Stadio del Ghiaccio di Cavalese	Loris Vicenzi	Ania Kristo
Zoldo Femminile	Val di Zoldo	Discoarena di Forno di Zoldo	Tito Meneghetti	Mia Campo Bagatin

=== History of participants ===
- HC Agordo

→ HC Agordo Femminile, Agordo (1990–2013)
→ HC Agordo Femminile, Feltre (2012–13)
→ HC Feltreghiaccio Femminile, Feltre (2013–14)

- HC Alleghe Femminile, Alleghe (1990–1996)
- Alleghe Hockey Girls, Alleghe (2014–2019)
- HC All Stars Milano, Milan (c.1994–95)
- HC All Stars Piemonte, Turin

→ HC Valpellice Girls (2000–01)
→ HC All Stars Piemonte Femminile (2001–2009)

- Aosta Girls Project, Aosta (2019–2023)
- Asiago Hockey AS Femminile, Asiago (2008–2010)
- HC Belluno Femminile, Belluno (1998–2001)
- EV Bozen Eagles, Bolzano

→ EV Bozen Eagles (2008–2017)
→ EVB Eagles Südtirol–Alto Adige (2017– )

- HC Bressanone Femminile, Bressanone (2002–03)
- SG Brunico Hot Line, Brunico (1994–95)
- Como Femminile, Como (2015–2019)
- HC Crocodiles Girls Merano, Merano (2001–2004)
- HC Diavoli Black Widows, Sesto San Giovanni (2012–13)
- HC Eagles Bolzano, Bolzano (1996–2008)
- HC Falchi Boscochiesanuova, Bosco Chiesanuova (1996–1999)
- Fassa-Gardena

→ HC Gardena Girls, Selva di Val Gardena (c.1995–1999)
→ HC Fassa-Gardena Girls (1999–2000)
→ SHC Fassa Girls, Canazei (2000–2002)

- HC Femminile Feltre, Feltre (c.1994–1999)
- HC Lakers

→ HC Appiano Lakers, Appiano (2009–2013)
→ HC Lakers, Neumarkt (2013–2023)
→ AHC Eurospar Lakers, Neumarkt (2023– )

- HC Lario Halloween, (Note: HC Lario Halloween is often called by the shorthand "Como" in reference to the province of Como, in which Lurate Caccivio is located.) Lurate Caccivio (c.1990–2007)
- Padova Waves Girls, Padua (2021–22)
- Real Torino HC, Turin (2009–2015)
- HC Toblach-Dobbiaco, Dobbiaco

→ HC Toblach-Dobbiaco Femminile (2018–2024)
→ HC 3 Zinnen Dolomites Women (2024– )

- HC Torino Bulls, Turin (2014–2019)
- SG Valbelluna (c.1994–1998)
- HC Yellow Team Milano, Milan (c.1995–1998)

== Champions ==
- 1990–91 Alleghe Femminile
- 1991–92 HC Agordo
- 1992–93 HC Agordo
- 1993–94 HC Agordo
- 1994–95 Alleghe Femminile
- 1995–96 HC Agordo
- 1996–97 HC Eagles Bolzano
- 1997–98 HC Eagles Bolzano
- 1998–99 HC Eagles Bolzano
- 1999–2000 HC Eagles Bolzano
- 2000–01 HC Agordo
- 2001–02 HC Agordo
- 2002–03 HC Agordo
- 2003–04 HC Eagles Bolzano
- 2004–05 HC Eagles Bolzano
- 2005–06 HC Eagles Bolzano
- 2006–07 HC Agordo
- 2007–08 HC Agordo
- 2008–09 HC Agordo
- 2009–10 EV Bozen Eagles
- 2010–11 EV Bozen Eagles
- 2011–12 EV Bozen Eagles
- 2012–13 EV Bozen Eagles
- 2013–14 EV Bozen Eagles
- 2014–15 EV Bozen Eagles
- 2015–16 EV Bozen Eagles
- 2016–17 EVB Eagles Südtirol
- 2017–18 EVB Eagles Südtirol
- 2018–19 Alleghe Hockey Girls
- 2019–20 playoffs cancelled due to COVID-19 pandemic
- 2020–21 EVB Eagles Südtirol
- 2021–22 EVB Eagles Südtirol
- 2022–23 EVB Eagles Südtirol
- 2023–24 EVB Eagles Südtirol
- 2024–25 EVB Eagles Südtirol

=== Titles by team ===
	Team	Titles
1	EVB Eagles Südtirol (EV Bozen Eagles)	14
2	HC Agordo	10
3	HC Eagles Bolzano	7
4	Alleghe Hockey	3

== See also ==
- Ice hockey in Italy
- Italian Hockey League
- Italian Ice Sports Federation
- European Women's Hockey League
