= EVB Eagles Südtirol =

EWHL and IHLW ice hockey team in Bolzano, Italy

Coordinates: 46°33′38.6″N 11°30′50.3″E

Eishockey Verein Bozen 84 Eagles Südtirol
- City: Bolzano, Italy
- League: European Women's Hockey League; Italian Hockey League Women
- Founded: 2008
- Home arena: Sparkasse Arena
- Colours: Red, white, blue
- Head coach: Stefano Daprà
- Captain: Jacqueline Pierri
- Parent club: E.V. Bozen 84 A.S.D.
- Website: Official website

Championships
- Italian Championship: 11 (2009-10, 2010-11, 2011-12, 2012-13, 2013-14, 2014–15, 2015–16, 2016–17, 2017–18, 2020–21, 2021–22, 2022-23, 2023-24)
- EWHL Championship: 2 (2013–14, 2016–17)

The EVB Eagles Südtirol, previously known as the EV Bozen Eagles during 2008 to 2017, are an ice hockey team in the European Women's Hockey League (EWHL) and the Italian Hockey League Women (IHLW; previously the Serie A). They play in Bolzano (German: Bozen), the capital city of the northern Italian province of South Tyrol (German: Südtirol, Italian: Alto Adige), at the Sparkasse Arena.

== History ==
=== EV Bozen 84 ===
Eishockey Verein Bozen 84 ('Ice Hockey Club Bolzano 84') or EV Bozen 84 was created as a junior men's ice hockey club in 1984 via the merger of four teams in the Bolzano area – SV Gries, HC Rentsch, HC Jugendclub, and Micky Maus. The club's representative team played in the Serie A2 and Serie C, the second and third levels of Italian men's ice hockey. The team's colors were blue and white and they played at the Sill Ice Sport Centre (German: Eissportzentrum Sill; Italian: Pista da ghiaccio Sill). Nicknamed the Old Weasels and the White Weasels, the team ceased operation in 2015 and the EV Bozen 84 representative team became a junior team. Between 2015 and 2018, the club's men's junior teams merged with those of the Hockey Academy Bolzano and the men's section of the club was dissolved.

==== Achievements ====
- Serie C U26 champion: 2010

==== Head coaches ====
- (Germany) Andreas Bentenrieder, 2009–10
- (Italy) Egon Schenk, 2010–11
- (Italy) Massimo Fedrizzi & Egon Schenk, 2011–12
- (Canada) (Germany) Fred Carroll, 2012–13
- (Finland) Tuomo Harjula & (Italy) Marco Liberatore, 2014–15

=== EV Bozen Eagles ===
The EV Bozen Eagles were founded by EV Bozen 84 in 2008, following the dissolution of the local women's ice hockey club, HC Eagles Bolzano, which had existed during 1991 to 2008. The EV Bozen Eagles have participated in the Italian Hockey League Women (IHLW) since the team's creation in 2008 and are the most successful team in league history, with eleven Italian Championship titles. They won the Scudetto, the Italian Championship trophy, nine consecutive times from 2009–10 to 2017–18.

Since the 2012–13 season, they have also competed in the European Women's Hockey League (previously the Elite Women's Hockey League) in addition to playing in the IHLW. The Eagles won the EWHL Championship in 2013–14 and 2016–17, and also achieved EWHL silver medals in 2014–15 and 2017–18 and the EWHL bronze medal in 2018–19.

EV Bozen participated in the IIHF European Women's Champions Cup tournaments in 2010–11, 2011–12, 2012–13, 2013–14, and 2014–15. They qualified for the second round, their highest finishes in the tournament, in both 2012–13 and 2014–15.

== Team achievements ==
=== Italian Championship ===
- (gold) Champions (13): 2009–10, 2010–11, 2011–12, 2012–13, 2013–14, 2014–15, 2015–16, 2016–17, 2017–18, 2020–21, 2021–22, 2022-23, 2023-24
- (silver) Runners-up (1): 2018–19

=== EWHL Championship ===
- (gold) Champions (2): 2013–14, 2016–17
- (silver) Silver (2): 2014–15, 2017–18
- (bronze) Bronze (1): 2018–19

== Players and personnel ==
=== Team captaincy history ===
- Chelsea Furlani, c. 2013–2019
- Valentina Bettarini & Chelsea Furlani, 2019–20
- Samantha Gius, 2021–22
- Mara Da Rech, 2022–23
- Jacquie Pierri, 2023–

=== Head coaches ===
- Massimo Fedrizzi, c. 2009–2014
- Marco Liberatore, 2014–15
- Fredy Püls, 2015–2020
- Stefano Daprà, 2020–

=== Notable alumnae ===
Years active with the EVB Eagles listed alongside player name.

- Michela Angeloni, 2008–2014
- Evelyn Bazzanella, 2009–2014
- Diana Da Rugna, 2009–2015
- Anna De la Forest, 2012–2015
- Linda De Rocco, 2012–2016
- Rebecca Fiorese, 2008–2010
- Waltraud Kaser, 2009–2013

International players

- (Hungary) (Canada) Alexandra Gowie, 2017–18
