= Zuzana Drdáková =

Slovak ice hockey player

- Born: 16 June 1987 (age 38)
- Height: 1.64 m (5 ft 5 in)
- Weight: 70 kg (154 lb; 11 st 0 lb)
- Position: Defence
- TBHBL team Former teams: Narmanspor; 2013–2015 HK Poprad
- Playing career: 2013–present

Zuzana Drdáková (born 16 June 1987) is a Slovak women's ice hockey player. Currently, she is a member of Narmanspor team in Erzurum, Turkey playing as defenceman. She is 1.64 m (5 ft 4 1/2 in) tall at 70 kg (150 lb).

== Career ==
=== Club ===
Zuzana Drdáková was with HK Poprad in her country before she transferred to the Erzurum-based Narmanspor in Turkey to play in the Turkish Women's Ice Hockey League (TBHBL). Her team finished the 2015–16 season as the runners-up.

== Honors ==
=== Club ===
Turkish Ice Hockey Women's League (TBHBL)

- Runners-up (1): 2015–16 with Narmanspor.
