= Meeri Räisänen =

Finnish ice hockey goaltender

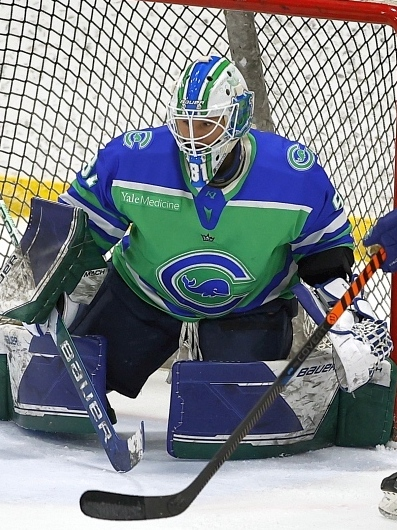
- Räisänen with the Connecticut Whale in 2023
- Born: 2 December 1989 (age 36) Tampere, Finland
- Height: 1.70 m (5 ft 7 in)
- Weight: 60 kg (132 lb; 9 st 6 lb)
- Position: Goaltender
- Catches: Left
- 2-div. team Former teams: Gladiators HT: Connecticut Whale; HPK Hämeenlinna; AIK IF Solna; JYP Jyväskylä; Kiekkokopla Joensuu; D-Kiekko Jyväskylä; SKIF Nizhny Novgorod; Espoo Blues; Robert Morris Colonials; Ilves Tampere
- National team: Finland
- Playing career: 2005–present
Medal record
Olympic Games
Bronze medal – third place	2018 Pyeongchang	Ice hockey
Bronze medal – third place	2022 Beijing	Ice hockey
World Championships
Bronze medal – third place	2015 Sweden
Bronze medal – third place	2021 Canada

Meeri Räisänen (born 2 December 1989) is a Finnish ice hockey goaltender and member of the Finnish national team, currently playing with Gladiators HT in the II-divisioona (2-div.), the fourth-tier men's national league in Finland. With the Finnish national team, she has won two Olympic bronze medals, two World Championship bronze medals, and has twice been named to the World Championship All-Star Team.

== Playing career ==
According to her parents, Räisänen wasn't satisfied with watching her older brother practice ice hockey at the Koulukatu open-air ice rink in their home city of Tampere, and instead hung on the boards and shouted that she wanted to go out on the ice until there was no alternative but to put skates on her feet and let her join in. She began playing with the youth section of the ice sports club Tappara in Tampere and became committed to goaltending by the age of nine. Crowded out of a goalie position on the club's top hockey team for her age group, she switched to ringette for several years but returned to hockey. By age 14, Räisänen was playing in the top women's ice hockey league in Finland, the Naisten SM-sarja (renamed Naisten Liiga in 2017), and practicing with the top-level boy's teams for her age group.

=== Career in Finland ===
In Finland's Naisten Liiga, Räisänen has played with HPK Kiekkonaiset, JYP Jyväskylä Naiset and the Jyväskylän Hockey Cats, the Tampereen Ilves Naiset, and the Espoo Blues Naiset winning the Finnish Championship with the Espoo Blues in 2009 and with JYP Jyväskylä in 2016. She is a three-time winner of the Tuula Puputti Award for best goaltender in the Naisten Liiga and has also been named to the league's First All-Star Team three times.

In addition to her career in the top women's league, Räisänen played portions of the 2015–16 and 2016–17 seasons in the Suomi-sarja, the third-tier men's ice hockey league in Finland. On 29 November 2015, she and fellow Finnish national team goaltender Noora Räty faced off against each other in a Suomi-sarja game between D-Kiekko and KJT. The netminders made history as “the first women’s goaltenders to go head-to-head in a professional men’s contest in Finland” and the game was, according to available accounts, the highest-level men's ice hockey game ever to feature opposing women goaltenders in any country. Räisänen held KJT to three goals, but D-Kiekko sacrificed two empty net goals after Räisänen was pulled, and the game ended with a 5–2 victory for Räty's KJT. Reflecting on the game in an interview following the match, Räisänen said, “Now two women goaltenders have proven that they can play at this level. Noora did it first, which helped change the attitudes towards women goaltenders and made my job easier. This match was a good way to promote women’s hockey. We want to [grow the game] and be examples for girls in the junior leagues.” According to the boxscore of the match, recorded by the Finnish Ice Hockey Association, only 70 spectators attended the landmark game.

During the 2021–22 season, she played in the men's U20 Mestis with JYP U20 Akatemia, a junior affiliate of JYP Jyväskylä.

=== International club career ===
Räisänen has also competed at the international club leagues, most recently with AIK Hockey Dam of the Swedish Women's Hockey League (SDHL) in the 2019–20 season. The 2014–15 season was spent with SKIF Nizhny Novgorod of the Women's Hockey League (ZhHL) and resulted in Russian Championship silver and the 2015 IIHF European Women's Champions Cup.

Räisänen was selected in the eighth round, 41st overall, by the Markham Thunder in the 2018 CWHL Draft but ultimately chose not to sign with the team.

She joined the Connecticut Whale of the National Women's Hockey League (NWHL; renamed Premier Hockey Federation (PHF) in 2021) for the 2018–19 season, becoming the first player from Finland to ever play the league. She made her debut with the Whale on 7 October 2018, matching up against Team USA Olympic goaltender Nicole Hensley of the Buffalo Beauts.

== International play ==
Räisänen was selected for the Finland women's national ice hockey team competing in the women's ice hockey tournament at the 2014 Winter Olympics in Sochi. She was the primary backup goaltender and dressed for all six games, though she did not see any ice time as starter Noora Räty guarded the net for each game. She has gone on to win bronze medals in the women's ice hockey tournament at the 2018 Winter Olympics in Pyeongchang, and in the women's ice hockey tournament at the 2022 Winter Olympics in Beijing.

Räisänen has also represented Finland at six IIHF Women's World Championships, first in 2012, and won bronze medals in 2015 and 2021. She was named to the tournament All-Star Team in 2015 and 2016.

== Career statistics ==
=== International ===
Year	Team	Event	Result	GP	W	L	MIN	GA	SO	GAA	SV%
2012	Finland	WW	4th	3	1	0	98:42	9	0	5.47	.800
2013	Finland	WW	4th	2	1	0	75:34	2	1	1.59	.895
2014	Finland	OG	5th	0	–	–	–	–	–	–	–
2015	Finland	WW	3rd place, bronze medalist(s)	5	3	2	301:27	10	1	1.99	.932
2016	Finland	WW	4th	6	2	4	346:07	14	1	2.43	.921
2018	Finland	OG	3rd place, bronze medalist(s)	0	–	–	–	–	–	–	–
2021	Finland	WW	3rd place, bronze medalist(s)	2	1	1	120:00	3	1	1.50	.938
2022	Finland	OG	3rd place, bronze medalist(s)	1	0	1	40:00	7	0	10.50	.800
2022	Finland	WW	6th	1	1	0	60:00	3	0	3.00	.850
Totals				20	9	8	1041:50	48	4	–	–

== Awards and honors ==
Award	Year
International
World Championship Bronze Medal	2015, 2021
World Championship All-Star Team	2015, 2016
Olympic Bronze Medal	2018, 2022
Naisten Liiga
Finnish Champion	2008–09, 2015–16
Tuula Puputti Award	2012–13, 2013–14, 2017–18
All-Star First Team	2012–13, 2013–14, 2017–18
Player of the Month	September 2017
Other
EWCC Champion	2014–15
EWCC Best Goaltender	2014–15
