= Milenyum Paten SK =

- City: Ankara, Turkey
- League: Turkish Ice Hockey Women's League (TBHBL)
- Founded: 2002
- Home arena: Ankara Ice Palace
- Colours
- Owner: (Turkey) Ali Öztaşdelen
- General manager: (Turkey) Umur Öztaşdelen
- Head coach: (Turkey) Ömer Arasan

Championships
- Regular season titles: 2008–09; 2009–10; 2010–11; 2011–12; 2013–14

Milenyum Paten Spor Kulübü is a Turkish women's ice hockey team in Ankara, Turkey playing in the Turkish Ice Hockey Women's League. Founded in 2002 for figure skating only, the club is active in ice hockey since 2007. In March 2014 the team won the league for the fifth time, becoming the most successful hockey team in the country. The club's colors are purple and silver.

The team, coached by Ömer Arasan, play their home matches at Ankara Ice Palace.

== History ==
The club was founded by Ali Öztaşdelen, whose children experienced problems with their ice skating club in Ankara. The two children, who performed figure skating, persuaded their father to form their own ice hockey club trusting to be successful. Five championship titles following a runner-up position right after the establishment proved this. Teammates are also friends of the two since 6–7 years of age, who are now university students. 80% of the team players are member of the Turkey women's national ice hockey team. While son Umur Öztaşdelen acts as general manager of the club, daughter Gizem Öztaşdelen is a national, playing in forward position.

Between 2002 and 2007, the club's activity was in the field of figure skating only. Today, Milenyum Paten is the most successful ice hockey team in the country with five league champion titles. In the 2011-12 season, Milenyum Paten scored 114 goals while receiving only four in seven matches.

== Team ==
=== 2013-2014 schedule and results ===
2013-2014 regular season results

Date	Team	Score	Score	Opponent	Location
Jan 11, 2014	Milenyum Paten SK	3	1	Narmanspor	Kocaeli
Jan 12, 2014	Milenyum Paten SK	4	1	Kocaeli Kağıtspor	Kocaeli
Jan 18, 2014	Milenyum Paten SK	1	5	Istanbul Buz Korsanları	Erzurum
Jan 19, 2014	Milenyum Paten SK	5	2	Narmanspor	Erzurum
Jan 25, 2014	Milenyum Paten SK	6	0	Kocaeli Kağıtspor	Kocaeli
Jan 26, 2014	Milenyum Paten SK	3	1	Istanbul Buz Korsanları	Kocaeli
Feb 01, 2014	Milenyum Paten SK	0	1	Narmanspor	Kocaeli
Feb 02, 2014	Milenyum Paten SK	5	0	Kocaeli Kağıtspor	Kocaeli
Feb 08, 2013	Milenyum Paten SK	3	2	Istanbul Buz Korsanları	Kocaeli

=== 2014 playoffs ===
Semi-Finals, Feb. 09, 2014
1	Milenyum Paten SK	9
4	Kocaeli Kağıtspor	3
2	Istanbul Buz Korsanları	1
3	Narmanspor	3

Finals, Feb. 22, 2010
1	Milenyum Paten SK	5
2	Narmanspor	4

=== Team roster (2014-2015) ===
#	Player	Nationality	Age
Goaltenders
1	Tanay Sinem Günay	(Turkey)	21
87	Buket Özsaygı	(Turkey)	24
Defense
99	Feriha Ceren Alkan	(Turkey)	24
9	Elif Bayrak	(Turkey)	23
19	İlkim Dilan Uygun	(Turkey)	19
27	Dayna Kanis	(Turkey) (Canada)	26
15	Refika Yılmaz	(Turkey)	24
21	Melisa Okuroğlu	(Turkey)	24
6	Meltem Uzun	(Turkey)	17
Forwards
10	Gizem Öztaşdelen	(Turkey)	22
13	Başak Demirkol	(Turkey)	20
63	Nilay Günay	(Turkey)	24
77	Tuğçe Melis Demir	(Turkey)	20
85	Burcu Turanal	(Turkey)	18
22	Mine Terzioğlu	(Turkey)	21
3	Ceylin Karakuş	(Turkey)	16
8	Nazli Karabük	(Turkey)	37
5	Enise Tuğba Koşka	(Turkey)	28
88	Aslı Nur Hayran	(Turkey)	18
17	İdil Kaba	(Turkey)	20

== International participation ==
Milenyum Paten debuted internationally in the first round of the 2009–10 IIHF European Women's Champions Cup - Group C held on October 30-November 1, 2009 in Kralupy nad Vltavou, Czech Republic, where they played against HC Slavia Prag of Czech Republic (0-16), Terme Maribor of Slovenia (2-9) and MHC Martin of Slovakia (3-11) without gaining a match, and receiving in total 36 goals making 5 only.

In the preliminary round of the 2010–11 IIHF European Women's Champions Cup's Group B held on October 29–31, 2010 in Ankara, they played against Aisulu Almaty of Kazakhstan (0-15), Grenoble Brûleurs de Loups of France (0-10) and Terme Maribor from Slovenia (5-7).

The next year at the first round in the Group B of 2011–12 IIHF European Women's Champions Cup held on October 28 to 30, 2011 in Miercurea Ciuc, Romania, Milenyum Paten's rivals were HK Pantera Minsk of Belarus (0-8), Grenoble Brûleurs de Loups from France (0-14) and HSC Csikszereda in Romania (2-5).

At their fourth appearance in the Group B of 2012–13 IIHF European Women's Champions Cup held on October 19–21, 2012 in Molodechno, Belarus, they met HK Pantera Minsk in Belarus (0-25), Aisulu Almaty from Kazakhstan (0-7) and SC Miercurea Ciuc of Romania (2-9).

In the preliminary round of the Group A of 2014–15 IIHF European Women's Champions Cup held on October 17–19, 2014 in Ankara, Turkey, Milenyum Paten managed to get their first at the international stage against SC Miercurea Ciuc of Romania (4-3). They lost to HK Poprad from Slovakia (2-5) and Aisulu Almaty from Kazakhstan (0-12). Milenyum Paten goalie Tanay Günay has received the best goalie award of the tournament.

== Achievements ==
- Turkish Women's League champion: 2008-09, 2009–10, 2010–11, 2011–12, 2013–14
- Turkish Women's League runner-up: 2007-08, 2012-1013
