= Tuula Puputti Award =

Finnish ice hockey award

Tuula Puputti Award Tuula Puputti -palkinto (Finnish)
- Sport: Ice hockey
- League: Auroraliiga
- Awarded for: Best goaltender
- Presented by: Finnish Ice Hockey Association

History
- First award: 2006
- First winner: Maija Hassinen-Sullanmaa
- Most wins: Anni Keisala (5)
- Most recent: Anni Keisala, 2026

The Tuula Puputti Award (Finnish: Tuula Puputti -palkinto) is an ice hockey trophy awarded seasonally by the Finnish Ice Hockey Association to the best goaltender of the Auroraliiga (called the Naisten SM-sarja during 1982 to 2017 and Naisten Liiga during 2017 to 2024).

It is named after Tuula Puputti, the first Olympic goaltender of the Finnish women's national team and former general manager of the Finnish women's national ice hockey program. Best goaltender in the Naisten SM-sarja was first awarded in the 2005–06 season, to Maija Hassinen-Sullanmaa (née Hassinen) of Ilves Tampere. The award was named in honor of Tuula Puputti during the 2010–11 season.

Only three players have won the award more than once: Meeri Räisänen, Maija Hassinen-Sullanmaa, and Anni Keisala. Räisänen has been named best goaltender three times, twice with JYP Jyväskylä, in 2012–13 and 2013–14, and with HPK Hämeenlinna in 2017–18. Hassinen-Sullanmaa won the trophy four times, in 2005–06 and 2007–08 with Ilves Tampere and in 2008–09 and 2010–11 with HPK Hämeenlinna. Keisala holds the record for most wins, with five. She was awarded while playing with Team Kuortane in 2014–15 and 2015–16, with Ilves Tampere in 2020–21 and 2021–22, and with HPK Hämeenlinna in 2025–26.

Polish-Australian goaltender Olivia Last was the first international player to receive the award, which she won while playing with TPS Turku in 2023–24.

== Award winners ==
Season	Winner	Team
2005–06	Maija Hassinen	Ilves Tampere
2006–07	Noora Räty	Blues Espoo
2007–08	Maija Hassinen	Ilves Tampere
2008–09	Maija Hassinen	HPK Hämeenlinna
2009–10	Anna Vanhatalo	Blues Espoo
2010–11	Maija Hassinen	HPK Hämeenlinna
2011–12	Isabella Portnoj	Blues Espoo
2012–13	Meeri Räisänen	JYP Jyväskylä
2013–14	Meeri Räisänen	JYP Jyväskylä
2014–15	Anni Keisala	Team Kuortane
2015–16	Anni Keisala	Team Kuortane
2016–17	Eveliina Suonpää	Lukko Rauma
2017–18	Meeri Räisänen	HPK Hämeenlinna
2018–19	Jenna Silvonen	Blues Espoo
2019–20	Johanna Oksman	Kärpät Oulu
2020–21	Anni Keisala	Ilves Tampere
2021–22	Anni Keisala	Ilves Tampere
2022–23	Emilia Kyrkkö	Team Kuortane
2023–24	Olivia Last	TPS Turku
2024–25	Salla Sivula	KalPa Kuopio
2025–26	Anni Keisala	HPK Hämeenlinna

Sources: Elite Prospects

== All time award recipients ==
Goalie	Wins	Year(s) won
Anni Keisala	5	2015, 2016, 2021, 2022, 2026
Maija Hassinen-Sullanmaa	4	2006, 2008, 2009, 2011
Meeri Räisänen	3	2013, 2014, 2018
Emilia Kyrkkö	1	2023
Olivia Last	1	2024
Johanna Oksman	1	2020
Isabella Laiho née Portnoj	1	2012
Noora Räty	1	2007
Jenna Silvonen	1	2019
Eveliina Mäkinen née Suonpää	1	2017
Salla Sivula	1	2025
Anna Vanhatalo	1	2010
