= Istanbul Buz Korsanları SK =

Turkish women's ice hockey team

İstanbul Buz Koranları SK
- City: Avcılar, Istanbul
- League: Turkish Ice Hockey Women's League (TBHBL)

Istanbul Buz Korsanları SK is a Turkish women's ice hockey team in Avcılar, Istanbul, Turkey playing in the Turkish Ice Hockey Women's League (TBHBL). The club was founded in 2009.

== Team roster ==
As of 2015–16 season.

#	Position	Player	Nationality	Birth date and age
5		Emral Mutlu	(Turkey)	June 5, 1993 (age 32)
6		Didem Bağcı	(Turkey)	June 4, 2000 (age 25)
7		Berrin Bağcı	(Turkey)	April 24, 1962 (age 63)
8	F	Ulyana Voitsik	(Belarus)	October 12, 1989 (age 36)
9		Hayriye Artış	(Turkey)	January 5, 2002 (age 24)
10		Hatice Çelik	(Turkey)	July 31, 1986 (age 39)
14		Seda Demir	(Turkey)	June 21, 1994 (age 31)
17		Tuba Dokur	(Turkey)	September 30, 1992 (age 33)
23		Arzu Genç	(Turkey)	April 23, 1967 (age 58)
24	D	Ekaterina Rudchenko	(Belarus)	January 1, 1987 (age 39)
34	F	Karyna Shyptsitkaya	(Belarus)	January 1, 1987 (age 39)
49	G	Tuğçe Baskın	(Turkey)	August 18, 1992 (age 33)
53		Burçak Gökçe	(Turkey)	April 1, 1992 (age 33)
57		Özlem Bağcı	(Turkey)	June 4, 2000 (age 25)
59		Hicran Kıvanç	(Turkey)	September 6, 1977 (age 48)
70		İlknur Karaca	(Turkey)	June 23, 1982 (age 43)
76	G	Natalia Bilgen	(Turkey)	November 19, 1975 (age 50)
77	G	Buşra Solak	(Turkey)	August 22, 1994 (age 31)
80		Alize Naz Çarkcı	(Turkey)	August 2, 1991 (age 34)
82		Aslı Çukurkavaklı	(Turkey)	January 31, 1982 (age 43)
83		Zehra Demirci	(Turkey)	March 29, 1992 (age 33)
99		Yadigar Artış	(Turkey)	October 17, 1997 (age 28)
		Aysun Yıldız	(Turkey)	May 1, 1992 (age 33)
	G	Emine Kübra Özer	(Turkey)	March 5, 1987 (age 38)
	F	Maria Jasmina Decu	(Turkey)	September 2, 1991 (age 34)
		Çiğdem Yakut	(Turkey)	May 22, 1983 (age 42)
		Münibe Gökçeçiçek Sipahi	(Turkey)	September 12, 1984 (age 41)
		Sümeyye Şenli	(Turkey)	October 20, 1999 (age 26)
		Aslınur Ayşe Göktepe	(Turkey)	November 11, 1992 (age 33)
	G	Hatıra Üstündağ	(Turkey)	November 1, 1992 (age 33)

Legend

- G: Goaltender
- D: Defenseman
- F: Forward
- C: Captain

== Honours ==
Turkish Women's First League

- Champion (1): 2015–16.
