= 2014–15 IIHF European Women's Champions Cup =

International ice hockey club tournament

Tournament details
- Host countries: Finland; Russia; Sweden; Switzerland; Czech Republic; Italy; Latvia; Turkey
- Venue(s): 8 (in 8 host cities)
- Dates: First Round; 17–19 October 2014; Second Round; 5–7 December 2014; Finals; 20–22 February 2015
- Format: Round-robin
- Teams: 21

Final positions
- Champions: (Russia) SKIF Nizhny Novgorod (2nd title)
- Runner-up: (Sweden) Linköpings HC
- Third place: (Finland) Espoo Blues
- Fourth place: (Switzerland) HC Lugano

Tournament statistics
- Scoring leader(s): Finals; Stefanie Marty, Linköpings HC (8 points)

The 2014–15 IIHF European Women's Champions Cup was the eleventh competition held for the IIHF European Women's Champions Cup. It was the last holding of the tournament before its scheduled stoppage in 2015. SKIF Nizhny Novgorod of Russia's Women's Hockey League won the tournament for the second time; the team had previously won the cup in 2009.

The tournament was the setting for the first instance of the “four-man officiating system” - two referees and two linesmen - at an IIHF women’s hockey tournament. The first puck-drop with four officials occurred in the Round 2 game between the Vienna Capitals and HC Poprad in Nizhny Novgorod with referees Kaisa Ketonen (FIN) and Marie Picavet (FRA), and linesmen Yekaterina Mikhalyova (KAZ) and Olga Steinberg (RUS).

== Round 1 ==
The first round was played during 17–19 October 2014. The winners of each group and the three best runners up out of all of the groups moved on to the next round.

=== Group A ===
Host City: Ankara, Turkey

==== Standings ====
Pos	Team	Pld	W	L	GF	GA	GD	Pts
1	(Slovakia) ŽHK Poprad	3	3	0	17	3	+14	9
2	(Kazakhstan) Aisulu Almaty	3	2	1	28	2	+26	6
3	(Turkey) Milenyum Ankara	3	1	2	6	20	−14	3
4	(Romania) HSC Csíkszereda	3	0	3	3	29	−26	0

==== Top scorers ====
1. Janka Čulíková (SVK), ŽHK Poprad, 10 points (7+3)
2. Karina Felzink (KAZ), Aisulu Almaty, 7 points (6+1)
3. Zarina Tukhtieva (KAZ), Aisulu Almaty, 6 points (4+2)
4. Anna Džurňáková (SVK), ŽHK Poprad, 5 points (3+2)
  Nadezhda Filimonova (KAZ), Aisulu Almaty, 5 points (3+2)

==== Best Players Selected by the Directorate ====
- Best Goaltender: Tanay Gunay (TUR), Milenyum Ankara
- Best Defenceman: Rayna Cruickshank (KAZ), Aisulu Almaty
- Best Forward: Janka Čulíková (SVK), ŽHK Poprad

=== Group B ===
Host City: Karviná, Czech Republic

==== Standings ====
Pos	Team	Pld	W	L	GF	GA	GD	Pts
1	(Austria) EHV Sabres Vienna	3	3	0	30	5	+25	9
2	(Czech Republic) SK Karviná	3	2	1	12	10	+2	6
3	(Poland) TH Unia Oświęcim	3	1	2	12	22	−10	3
4	(United Kingdom) Bracknell Queen Bees	3	0	3	4	21	−17	0

==== Top scorers ====
1. Anna Meixner (AUT), EHV Sabres Vienna, 10 points (6+4)
2. Karolina Późniewska (POL), TH Unia Oświęcim, 10 points (5+5)
3. Pia Pren (SLO), EHV Sabres Vienna, 9 points (4+5)
4. Kaitlin Spurling (USA), EHV Sabres Vienna, 8 points (4+4)
5. Venla Hovi (FIN), EHV Sabres Vienna, 6 points (3+3)

==== Best Players Selected by the Directorate ====
- Best Goaltender: Victoria Vigilanti (CAN), EHV Sabres Vienna
- Best Defenceman: Regan Boulton (CAN), EHV Sabres Vienna
- Best Forward: Anna Meixner (AUT), EHV Sabres Vienna

=== Group C ===
Host City: Liepāja, Latvia

==== Standings ====
Pos	Team	Pld	W	L	GF	GA	GD	Pts
1	(Denmark) Herlev Hornets	3	3	0	21	5	+16	9
2	(Latvia) SHK Laima Rīga	3	2	1	6	5	+1	6
3	(Norway) Jordal IK Oslo	3	1	2	6	12	−6	3
4	(Spain) SAD Majadahonda	3	0	3	5	16	−11	0

==== Top scorers ====
1. Maria Olausson (DEN), Herlev Hornets, 11 points (6+5)
2. Silke Glud (DEN), Herlev Hornets, 8 points (5+3)
3. Marie Henriksen (DEN), Herlev Hornets, 7 points (3+4)
4. Agnese Apsīte (LAT), SHK Laima Rīga, 5 points (4+1)
5. Christina Andersen (DEN), Herlev Hornets, 5 points (1+4)

=== Group D ===
Host City: Bolzano, Italy

==== Standings ====
Pos	Team	Pld	W	L	GF	GA	GD	Pts
1	(Italy) EV Bozen Eagles	3	3	0	21	1	+20	9
2	(France) HC Neuilly-sur-Marne	3	2	1	17	8	+9	6
3	(Hungary) UTE Marilyn Budapest	3	1	2	9	10	−1	3
4	(Croatia) KHL Grič Zagreb	3	0	3	4	32	−28	0

==== Top scorers ====
1. Chelsea Furlani (ITA/USA), EV Bozen Eagles, 12 points (7+5)
2. Anna de la Forest (ITA), EV Bozen Eagles, 12 points (2+10)
3. Eleonora Dalprà (ITA), EV Bozen Eagles, 11 points (4+7)
4. Cindy Debuquet (FRA), HC Neuilly-sur-Marne, 8 points (4+4)
5. Lili Pintér (HUN), UTE Marilyn Budapest, 6 points (3+3)

== Round 2 ==
The second round was played during 5–7 December 2014. The winner of each group progressed to the finals.

=== Group E ===
Host City: Nizhny Novgorod, Russia

==== Standings ====
Pos	Team	Pld	W	L	GF	GA	GD	Pts
1	(Russia) SKIF Nizhny Novgorod	3	3	0	13	1	+12	9
2	(Austria) EHV Sabres Vienna	3	2	1	9	4	+5	6
3	(Czech Republic) SK Karviná	3	1	2	7	7	0	3
4	(Slovakia) HK Poprad	3	0	3	3	20	−17	0

==== Top scorers ====
1. Olga Sosina (RUS), SKIF Nizhny Novgorod, 6 points (1+5)
2. Pia Pren (SLO), EHV Sabres Vienna, 5 points (4+1)
3. Maria Pechnikova (RUS), SKIF Nizhny Novgorod, 5 points (2+3)
4. Aneta Ledlova (CZE), SK Karviná, 4 points (2+2)
5. Anna Meixner (AUT), EHV Sabres Vienna, 3 points (3+0)

==== Best Players Selected by the Directorate ====
- Best Goaltender: Meeri Räisänen (FIN), SKIF Nizhny Novgorod
- Best Defenceman: Regan Boulton (CAN), EHV Sabres Vienna
- Best Forward: Karoliina Rantamäki (FIN), SKIF Nizhny Novgorod

=== Group F ===
Host City: Lugano, Switzerland

==== Standings ====
Pos	Team	Pld	W	L	GF	GA	GD	Pts
1	(Switzerland) HC Lugano	3	3	0	20	2	+18	9
2	(Germany) ESC Planegg	3	2	1	13	8	+5	6
3	(Denmark) Herlev Hornets	3	1	2	7	14	−7	3
4	(France) HC Neuilly-sur-Marne	3	0	3	2	18	−16	0

==== Top scorers ====
1. Bettina Meyer (CHE), HC Lugano, 7 points (3+4)
2. Silke Glud (DEN), HC Lugano, 6 points (3+3)
3. Sophie Kratzer (GER), ESC Planegg, 6 points (2+4)
4. Evelina Raselli (CHE), HC Lugano, 5 points (4+1)
  Kerstin Spielberger (GER), ESC Planegg, 5 points (4+1)
5. Nicole Gifford (CAN), HC Lugano, 5 points (3+2)

=== Group G ===
Host City: Linköping, Sweden

==== Standings ====
Pos	Team	Pld	W	L	GF	GA	GD	Pts
1	(Sweden) Linköpings HC	3	3	0	17	1	+16	9
2	(Finland) Espoo Blues	3	2	1	14	8	+6	6
3	(Kazakhstan) Aisulu Almaty	3	1	2	9	10	−1	3
4	(Italy) EV Bozen Eagles	3	0	3	4	25	−21	0

==== Top scorers ====
1. Denise Altmann (AUT), Linköpings HC, 8 points (4+4)
2. Michelle Karvinen (FIN), Espoo Blues, 7 points (5+2)
3. Pernilla Winberg (SWE), Linköpings HC, 6 points (2+4)
4. Minttu Tuominen (FIN), Espoo Blues, 4 points (4+0)
5. Stefanie Marty (CHE), Linköpings HC, 4 points (2+2)
  Emilia Andersson (SWE), Linköpings HC, 4 points (2+2)
  Tatyana Koroleva (KAZ), Aisulu Almaty, 4 points (2+2)

== Finals ==
The tournament finals (Group H) were held during 20–22 February 2015. The round was hosted in Espoo, Finland and all games were played at the Espoonlahti Ice Rink.

=== Standings ===
Pos	Team	Pld	W	OTW	OTL	L	GF	GA	GD	Pts
1	(Russia) SKIF Nizhny Novgorod	3	3	0	0	0	12	6	+6	9
2	(Sweden) Linköpings HC	3	2	0	0	1	15	4	+11	6
3	(Finland) Espoo Blues	3	0	1	0	2	9	13	−4	2
4	(Switzerland) HC Lugano	3	0	0	1	2	9	22	−13	1

=== Results ===
20 Feb 2015; 12:30	HC Lugano (Switzerland)	0–9 (0–5, 0–6, 0–9)	(Sweden) Linköpings HC	Espoonlahti Ice Rink

Game reference

Luana Jam
Goalies
Vendela Jonsson
Referees:
Aina Hove (NOR)
Marie Picavet (FRA)
Linesmen:
Bettina Angerer (AUT)
Jenni Heikkinen (FIN)

0–1	08:05 – Altmann (Marty)
0–2	14:35 – Wakefield (E. Andersson, Adolfsson)
0–3	15:01 – Altmann (Marty)
0–4	19:26 – Winberg (Altmann, Holmbom)
0–5	19:36 – Winberg (Marty, Altmann)
0–6	28:02 – Aronsson (Marty, L. Jonsson)
0–7	46:18 – Holmbom (Wakefield, M. Andersson)
0–8	47:58 – Wakefield
0–9	54:58 – Altmann (Marty, Holmbom)

31 min
Penalties
6 min
12
Shots
48

20 Feb 2015; 16:00	SKIF Nizhni Novgorod (Russia)	3–1 (0–1, 1–0, 2–0)	(Finland) Espoo Blues	Espoonlahti Ice Rink

Game reference

Meeri Räisänen
Goalies
Isabella Portnoj
Referees:
Drahomira Fialova (CHE)
Katarina Timglas (SWE)
Linesmen:
Kaire Leet (EST)
Lisa Linnek (GER)

	0–1	18:27 – Nuutinen (Välimäki)
Falyakhova – 21:51	1–1
Rantamäki (Sosina) – 51:02	2–1
Sosina – 59:45	3–1

6 min
Penalties
6 min
28
Shots
30

21 Feb 2015; 12:30	Espoo Blues (Finland)	6–5 (2–1, 2–3, 1–1, 1–0)	(Switzerland) HC Lugano	Espoonlahti Ice Rink

Game reference

Isabella Portnoj
Goalies
Sasha Ronchi
Referees:
Marie Picavet (FRA)
Katarina Timglas (SWE)
Linesmen:
Bettina Angerer (AUT)
Anna Nygard (NOR)

Nuutinen (Välimäki, Rajahuhta) – 00:41	1–0
	1–1	08:51 – Gifford (Raselli, Buser)
Tanskanen, (Karvinen) – 09:42	2–1
Välimäki (Nuutinen) – 22:58	3–1
	3–2	29:26 – Stiefel (Meyer, Buser)
	3–3	35:45 – Stiefel (Bullo, Meyer)
	3–4	37:07 – Meyer (Raselli)
Tanskanen (Karvinen) – 38:42	4–4
Karvinen – 48:42	5–4
	5–5	58:40 – Gifford (Bullo, Eggimann)
Tanskanen (Karvinen) – OT 63:39	6–5

10 min
Penalties
20 min
30
Shots
27

21 Feb 2015; 16:00	SKIF Nizhny Novgorod (Russia)	2–1 (0–0, 1–1, 1–0)	(Sweden) Linköpings HC	Espoonlahti Ice Rink

Game reference

Meeri Räisänen
Goalies
Kim Martin Hasson
Referees:
Aina Hove (NOR)
Kaisa Ketonen (FIN)
Linesmen:
Jenni Heikkinen (FIN)
Kaire Leet (EST)

	0–1	31:31 – Morset (Almann, Winberg)
Rantamäki (Jalosuo, Sosina) – 35:37	1–1
Pechnikova (Jalosuo, Semenets) – 47:17	2–1

10 min
Penalties
6 min
19
Shots
41

22 Feb 2015; 12:30	HC Lugano (Switzerland)	4–7 (0–2, 2–2, 2–3)	(Russia) SKIF Nizhny Novgorod	Espoonlahti Ice Rink

Game reference

Luana Jam
Goalies
Meeri Räisänen
Referees:
Kaisa Ketonen (FIN)
Marie Picavet (FRA)
Linesmen:
Jenni Heikkinen (FIN)
Anna Nygard (NOR)

	0–1	00:48 – Rantamäki (Sosina)
	0–2	19:47 PP – Pechnikova (Rantamäki, Jalosuo)
	0–3	23:55 – Falyakhova
Eggimann (Meyer, Wohlfeiler) – PP 27:42	1–3
Eggimann (Brickner, Bullo) – PP 37:42	2–3
	2–4	38:39 – Rakhimova (Sosina)
	2–5	43:25 – Sosina (Rantamäki)
Wohlfeiler (Eggimann) – 44:21	3–5
	3–6	44:35 – Nadezhdina (Falyakhova)
Bullo (Meyer, Stiefel) – 53:45	4–6
	4–7	58:31 – Falyakhova (Rakhimova, Semenets)

10 min
Penalties
12 min
28
Shots
39

22 Feb 2015; 16:00	Linköpings HC (Sweden)	5–2 (0–1, 3–0, 2–1)	(Finland) Espoo Blues	Espoonlahti Ice Rink

Game reference

Vendela Jonsson
Goalies
Isabella Portnoj
Referees:
Drahomira Fialova (SUI)
Aina Hove (NOR)
Linesmen:
Bettina Angerer (AUT)
Lisa Linnek (GER)

	0–1	10:12 – Karvinen (Tanskanen)
Haug-Hansen (Olsson) – 22:16	1–1
Winberg (Marty) – 26:39	2–1
Haug-Hansen – SH 36:12	3–1
	3–2	42:39 PP – Nuutinen (Välimäki)
Altmann (Marty, Winberg) – 57:51	4–2
Marty – 59:56	5–2

26 min
Penalties
10 min
31
Shots
28

=== Top scorers ===
1. Stefanie Marty (CHE), Linköpings HC, 8 points (1+7)
2. Denise Altmann (AUT), Linköpings HC, 7 points (4+3)
3. Olga Sosina (RUS), SKIF Nizhny Novgorod, 6 points (2+4)
4. Karoliina Rantamäki (FIN), SKIF Nizhny Novgorod, 5 points (3+2)
  Pernilla Winberg (CHE), Linköpings HC, 5 points (3+2)
5. Michelle Karvinen (FIN), Espoo Blues, 5 points (2+3)

=== Best Players Selected by the Directorate ===
Award	No.	Name	Team
Best Goalkeeper	34	Meeri Räisänen (FIN)	(Russia) SKIF Nizhny Novgorod
Best Defenceman	7	Mira Jalosuo (FIN)	(Russia) SKIF Nizhny Novgorod
Best Forward	9	Anja Stiefel (CHE)	(Switzerland) HC Lugano
