= 2010–11 IIHF European Women's Champions Cup =

International ice hockey club tournament

Tournament details
- Host countries: Switzerland; Austria; Czech Republic; Finland; Italy; Latvia; Turkey
- Dates: Round 1; 29–31 October 2010; Round 2; 5–6 December 2010; Finals; 12–14 March 2010
- Format: Round-robin

Final positions
- Champions: (Finland) Ilves Tampere (1st title)
- Runners-up: (Russia) SKIF Nizhny Novgorod
- Third place: (Switzerland) HC Lugano
- Fourth place: (Kazakhstan) Aisulu Almaty

Tournament statistics
- Scoring leader(s): Finals; Kira Misikowetz, HC Lugano (7 points)

The 2010–11 IIHF European Women's Champions Cup was the seventh holding of the IIHF European Women Champions Cup (EWCC). Ilves Tampere Naiset of the Naisten SM-sarja won the tournament for the first time, the first Finnish team to claim the title.

== First round ==
=== Group A ===
Pos	Team	Pld	W	OTW	OTL	L	GF	GA	GD	Pts
1	(Switzerland) HC Lugano	3	3	0	0	0	31	1	+30	9
2	(Italy) EV Bozen 84	3	2	0	0	1	8	6	+2	6
3	(United Kingdom) Slough Phantoms	3	1	0	0	2	7	13	−6	3
4	(Spain) Valladolid Panteras	3	0	0	0	3	0	26	−26	0

=== Group B ===
Pos	Team	Pld	W	OTW	OTL	L	GF	GA	GD	Pts
1	(Kazakhstan) Aisulu Almaty	3	3	0	0	0	35	0	+35	9
2	(France) Brûleurs de Loups de Grenoble	3	2	0	0	1	17	6	+11	6
3	(Slovenia) Terme Maribor	3	1	0	0	2	9	28	−19	3
4	(Turkey) Milenyum Ankara	3	0	0	0	3	5	32	−27	0

=== Group C ===
Pos	Team	Pld	W	OTW	OTL	L	GF	GA	GD	Pts
1	(Norway) Vålerenga IF Oslo	3	3	0	0	0	13	5	+8	9
2	(Denmark) Herlev Hornets	3	2	0	0	1	21	8	+13	6
3	(Latvia) SHK Laima Riga	3	1	0	0	2	9	9	0	3
4	(Poland) TMH Polonia Bytom	3	0	0	0	3	10	31	−21	0

=== Group D ===
Pos	Team	Pld	W	OTW	OTL	L	GF	GA	GD	Pts
1	(Austria) EHV Sabres	3	3	0	0	0	43	0	+43	9
2	(Slovakia) HK Spišská Nová Ves	3	2	0	0	1	15	13	+2	6
3	(Hungary) UTE Marilyn Budapest	3	1	0	0	2	7	20	−13	3
4	(Romania) SC Miercurea Ciuc	3	0	0	0	3	1	33	−32	0

== Second round ==
=== Group E ===
Pos	Team	Pld	W	OTW	OTL	L	GF	GA	GD	Pts
1	(Switzerland) HC Lugano	3	2	1	0	0	18	10	+8	8
2	(Russia) SKIF Nizhny Novgorod	3	1	1	1	0	16	9	+7	6
3	(Czech Republic) HC Slavia Praha	3	1	0	1	1	12	12	0	4
4	(Austria) EHV Sabres	3	0	0	0	3	7	22	−15	0

=== Group F ===
Pos	Team	Pld	W	OTW	OTL	L	GF	GA	GD	Pts
1	(Kazakhstan) Aisulu Almaty	3	3	0	0	0	7	1	+6	9
2	(Finland) Ilves Tampere	3	2	0	0	1	7	5	+2	6
3	(Germany) OSC Berlin	3	1	0	0	2	6	6	0	3
4	(Norway) Vålerenga IF Oslo	3	0	0	0	3	2	10	−8	0

== Final round ==
Pos	Team	Pld	W	OTW	OTL	L	GF	GA	GD	Pts
1	(Finland) Ilves Tampere	3	2	1	0	0	11	7	+4	8
2	(Russia) SKIF Nizhny Novgorod	3	1	1	0	1	10	9	+1	5
3	(Switzerland) HC Lugano	3	0	1	2	0	10	11	−1	4
4	(Kazakhstan) Aisulu Almaty	3	0	0	1	2	1	5	−4	1
