= 2007–08 IIHF European Women's Champions Cup =

International ice hockey club tournament

Tournament details
- Host countries: Sweden; Germany; Russia; Bulgaria; Czech Republic; France; Slovakia
- Venue(s): 7 (in 7 host cities)
- Dates: Qualification; 5–7 October 2007; Second Round; 30 November–2 December 2007; Finals; 29 January–3 February 2008
- Teams: 21

Final positions
- Champions: (Sweden) AIK IF (4th title)
- Runner-up: (Finland) Espoo Blues
- Third place: (Kazakhstan) Aisulu Almaty
- Fourth place: (Switzerland) HC Lugano

Tournament statistics
- Scoring leader(s): Finals; Pernilla Winberg, AIK IF (9 points)

The 2007–08 IIHF European Women's Champions Cup was the fourth season of the IIHF European Women's Champions Cup tournament. Reigning champions AIK IF Solna from Stockholm, Sweden claimed their fourth consecutive cup title in the Super Final.

== Qualification ==
=== Group A ===
Pos	Team	Pld	W	OTW	OTL	L	GF	GA	GD	Pts
1	(Kazakhstan) Aisulu Almaty	3	3	0	0	0	13	0	+13	9
2	(Austria) EHV Sabres	3	2	0	0	1	17	11	+6	6
3	(Bulgaria) HC Sofia	3	1	0	0	2	12	16	−4	3
4	(Denmark) Herlev Hornets	3	0	0	0	3	0	15	−15	0

Source: IIHF

=== Group B ===
Pos	Team	Pld	W	OTW	OTL	L	GF	GA	GD	Pts
1	(Slovakia) MHK Martin	3	2	0	1	0	28	5	+23	7
2	(Slovenia) Terme Maribor	3	2	0	0	1	45	6	+39	6
3	(Latvia) SHK Laima Rīga	3	1	1	0	1	39	8	+31	5
4	(Turkey) Büyükşehir Belediyesi Ankara SK	3	0	0	0	3	1	94	−93	0

Source: IIHF

=== Group C ===
Pos	Team	Pld	W	OTW	OTL	L	GF	GA	GD	Pts
1	(France) HC Cergy-Pontoise	3	3	0	0	0	14	3	+11	9
2	(Norway) Vålerenga IF Oslo	3	2	0	0	1	20	4	+16	6
3	(United Kingdom) Slough Phantoms	3	1	0	0	2	10	16	−6	3
4	(Estonia) Dreamland Queens Tallinn	3	0	0	0	3	0	21	−21	0

Source: IIHF

=== Group D ===
Pos	Team	Pld	W	OTW	OTL	L	GF	GA	GD	Pts
1	(Czech Republic) HC Slavia Praha	3	3	0	0	0	33	2	+31	9
2	(Italy) HC Eagles Bozen	3	2	0	0	1	16	5	+11	6
3	(Hungary) UTE Marilyn Budapest	3	1	0	0	2	6	17	−11	3
4	(Romania) SC Miercurea Ciuc	3	0	0	0	3	2	33	−31	0

Source: IIHF

== Second round ==
=== Group E ===
Pos	Team	Pld	W	OTW	OTL	L	GF	GA	GD	Pts
1	(Kazakhstan) Aisulu Almaty	3	1	2	0	0	11	3	+8	7
2	(Finland) Espoo Blues	3	2	0	1	0	12	4	+8	7
3	(Russia) Tornado Moscow Region	3	1	0	1	1	15	3	+12	4
4	(Slovakia) MHK Martin	3	0	0	0	3	3	31	−28	0

Source: IIHF

=== Group F ===
Pos	Team	Pld	W	OTW	OTL	L	GF	GA	GD	Pts
1	(Switzerland) HC Lugano	3	3	0	0	0	18	7	+11	9
2	(Germany) OSC Berlin	3	1	1	0	1	13	9	+4	5
3	(Czech Republic) HC Slavia Praha	3	1	0	1	1	13	11	+2	4
4	(France) HC Cergy-Pontoise	3	0	0	0	3	4	21	−17	0

Source: IIHF

== Super Final ==
Pos	Team	Pld	W	OTW	OTL	L	GF	GA	GD	Pts
1	(Sweden) AIK	4	4	0	0	0	21	9	+12	12
2	(Finland) Espoo Blues	4	3	0	0	1	13	8	+5	9
3	(Kazakhstan) Aisulu Almaty	4	2	0	0	2	11	9	+2	6
4	(Switzerland) HC Lugano	4	1	0	0	3	10	22	−12	3
5	(Germany) OSC Berlin	4	0	0	0	4	9	16	−7	0

Source: IIHF
