= Narmanspor =

- City: Narman, Erzurum
- League: Kadınlar Ligi
- Home arena: Erzurum GSIM Ice Arena
- Colors: Green, white, black
- General manager: Hüseyin Yavuz
- Head coach: Huriye Yeliz Yüksel
- Captain: Huriye Yeliz Yüksel

Narmanspor, also known as Narman Spor Kulübü or Narman SK, is an ice hockey club in the Turkish Women's Ice Hockey League (Kadınlar Ligi). They play in the Narman district of Erzurum, Turkey at Erzurum GSIM Ice Arena.

The club's colors are white and black on green. Narmanspor's current president is Hüseyin Yavuz. The team is coached by Huriye Yeliz Yüksel, who is also the captain.

In February 2013, the club transferred the 23-year-old Canadian player Brıttany Marie McCabe to strengthen the squad. The team finished the 2013–14 league season in the second rank. In March 2014, ten players of the team were called up to the Turkey women's national ice hockey team's 30 candidates by the Turkish Ice Hockey Federation.

== Team roster ==
As of 2015–16 season.

Pos.	#	Player	Nationality	Birth date and age
G	1	Merve Karataş	(Turkey)	September 26, 2000 (age 26)
F	2	Hatice Dursun	(Turkey)	August 20, 1999 (age 27)
F	3	Seda Betül Nur Metin	(Turkey)	December 25, 1996 (age 29)
F	5	Şüheda Kutluca	(Turkey)	October 14, 1996 (age 30)
F	7	Fulya Yurt	(Turkey)	October 17, 1994 (age 32)
F	8	Ayşenur Kurdal	(Turkey)	October 13, 1993 (age 33)
F	9	Huriye Yeliz Yüksel	(Turkey)	May 22, 1984 (age 42)
D	10	İkranur Yerlikaya	(Turkey)	June 25, 1996 (age 30)
F	11	Gulia Muhajer	(Turkey)	May 6, 1981 (age 45)
F	13	Zehra Kaplan	(Turkey)	February 21, 1998 (age 28)
D	14	Edanur Kavaz	(Turkey)	September 15, 1995 (age 31)
F	16	Petra Dankova	(Slovakia)	March 18, 1984 (age 42)
F	18	Sema Nur Güven	(Turkey)	May 7, 1998 (age 28)
F	20	Burcu Yıldırım	(Turkey)	September 1, 1989 (age 37)
G	25	Kübra Dadaşoğlu	(Turkey)	December 25, 1996 (age 29)
D	33	Gamze Altıntaş	(Turkey)	September 30, 1986 (age 40)
F	35	Şeymanur Kavaz	(Turkey)	November 16, 1992 (age 33)
D	53	Pınar Eser	(Turkey)	August 21, 1999 (age 27)
F	61	Şebnem Dalğacı	(Turkey)	August 13, 1999 (age 27)
F	71	Edanur Özen	(Turkey)	June 13, 2000 (age 26)
D	77	Nil Eryılmaz	(Turkey)	April 17, 1995 (age 31)
F	99	Betül Tayğar	(Turkey)	August 24, 1997 (age 29)
F		Elif Güldalı	(Turkey)	September 5, 1998 (age 28)
G		Elif Çaler	(Turkey)	August 23, 1999 (age 27)
F		Semanur Karan	(Turkey)	February 3, 2001 (age 25)
D		Özge Dumlu	(Turkey)	February 20, 1998 (age 28)
F		Mukaddes Buylucu	(Turkey)	July 20, 1996 (age 30)
D		Zuzana Drdakova	(Slovakia)	June 16, 1987 (age 39)

Legend

- G: Goaltender
- D: Defenseman
- F: Forward
- C: Captain

== Honours ==
Turkish Women's League

- Champion (2): 2014–15, 2016–17.
- Runners-up (2): 2013–14, 2015–16
