= 2011–12 IIHF European Women's Champions Cup =

International ice hockey club tournament

Tournament details
- Host countries: Finland; Austria; Slovakia; Latvia; Romania; Poland
- Venues: 6 (in 6 host cities)
- Dates: Round 1; 28–30 October 2011; Round 2; 2–4 December 2011; Finals; 24–26 February 2012
- Teams: 20

Final positions
- Champions: (Russia) Tornado Moscow Region (2nd title)
- Runners-up: (Switzerland) ZSC Lions Frauen
- Third place: (Finland) HPK Hämeenlinna
- Fourth place: (Germany) ESC Planegg

Tournament statistics
- Scoring leader(s): Finals; Danijela Rundqvist, Tornado Moscow Region (7 points)

The 2011-12 IIHF European Women Champions Cup was the eighth playing of the IIHF European Women Champions Cup. Tornado Moscow Region of the Russian Women's Hockey League won the tournament for the second time in three seasons.

== First round ==
The first round was contested in four host cities during 28 to 30 October 2011.

=== Group A ===
Group A was played in Bytom, Poland.

==== Standings ====
| Pos | Team | Pld | W | OTW | OTL | L | GF | GA | GD | Pts |
|---|---|---|---|---|---|---|---|---|---|---|
| 1 | (Germany) ESC Planegg | 3 | 3 | 0 | 0 | 0 | 47 | 0 | +47 | 9 |
| 2 | (Italy) Bolzano Eagles | 3 | 2 | 0 | 0 | 1 | 15 | 9 | +6 | 6 |
| 3 | (Poland) TMH Polonia Bytom | 3 | 1 | 0 | 0 | 2 | 13 | 27 | −14 | 3 |
| 4 | (Spain) Valladolid Panteras | 3 | 0 | 0 | 0 | 3 | 2 | 41 | −39 | 0 |

- (Germany) ESC Planegg advanced to the second round.

==== Results ====
| Oct 28, 2011; 16:00 | ESC Planegg (Germany) | 6–0 (2–0, 2–0, 2–0) | (Italy) Bolzano Eagles | Osrodek Sportu, Bytom, Poland |

Game reference

| Oct 28, 2011; 19:30 | TMH Polonia Bytom (Poland) | 10–2 (1–1, 5–1, 4–0) | (Spain) Valladolid Panteras | Osrodek Sportu, Bytom, Poland |

Game reference

| Oct 29, 2011; 15:00 | ESC Planegg (Germany) | 22–0 (3–0, 8–0, 11–0) | (Spain) Valladolid Panteras | Osrodek Sportu, Bytom, Poland |

Game reference

| Oct 29, 2011; 18:30 | TMH Polonia Bytom (Poland) | 3–6 (0–2, 3–1, 0–3) | (Italy) Bolzano Eagles | Osrodek Sportu, Bytom, Poland |

Game reference

| Oct 30, 2011; 14:30 | Bolzano Eagles (Italy) | 9–0 (3–0, 2–0, 4–0) | (Spain) Valladolid Panteras | Osrodek Sportu, Bytom, Poland |

Game reference

| Oct 30, 2011; 18:00 | ESC Planegg (Germany) | 19–0 (5–0, 6–0, 8–0) | (Poland) TMH Polonia Bytom | Osrodek Sportu, Bytom, Poland |

Game reference

=== Group B ===
Group B was played in Miercurea Ciuc, Romania.

==== Standings ====
| Pos | Team | Pld | W | OTW | OTL | L | GF | GA | GD | Pts |
|---|---|---|---|---|---|---|---|---|---|---|
| 1 | (France) Brûleurs de Loups de Grenoble | 3 | 3 | 0 | 0 | 0 | 35 | 0 | +35 | 9 |
| 2 | (Belarus) HK Pantera Minsk | 3 | 2 | 0 | 0 | 1 | 22 | 3 | +19 | 6 |
| 3 | (Romania) HSC Csikszereda | 3 | 1 | 0 | 0 | 2 | 5 | 34 | −29 | 3 |
| 4 | (Turkey) Milenyum Ankara | 3 | 0 | 0 | 0 | 3 | 2 | 27 | −25 | 0 |

- (France) Brûleurs de Loups de Grenoble advanced to the second round.

==== Results ====
| Oct 28, 2011; 16:00 | HK Pantera Minsk (Belarus) | 8–0 (2–0, 2–0, 4–0) | (Turkey) Milenyum Ankara | Lajos Vákár Ice Hall, Miercurea Ciuc, Romania |

Game reference

| Oct 28, 2011; 19:30 | Brûleurs de Loups de Grenoble (France) | 18–0 (6–0, 6–0, 6–0) | (Romania) HSC Csikszereda | Lajos Vákár Ice Hall, Miercurea Ciuc, Romania |

Game reference

| Oct 29, 2011; 16:00 | HK Pantera Minsk (Belarus) | 0–3 (0–0, 0–2, 0–1) | (France) Brûleurs de Loups de Grenoble | Lajos Vákár Ice Hall, Miercurea Ciuc, Romania |

Game reference

| Oct 29, 2011; 19:30 | HSC Csikszereda (Romania) | 5–2 (2–0, 3–2, 0–0) | (Turkey) Milenyum Ankara | Lajos Vákár Ice Hall, Miercurea Ciuc, Romania |

Game reference

| Oct 30, 2011; 16:00 | Milenyum Ankara (Turkey) | 0–14 (0–7, 0–4, 0–3) | (France) Brûleurs de Loups de Grenoble | Lajos Vákár Ice Hall, Miercurea Ciuc, Romania |

Game reference

| Oct 30, 2011; 19:30 | HSC Csikszereda (Romania) | 0–14 (0–6, 0–5, 0–3) | (Belarus) HK Pantera Minsk | Lajos Vákár Ice Hall, Miercurea Ciuc, Romania |

Game reference

=== Group C ===
Group C was played in Riga, Latvia.

==== Standings ====
| Pos | Team | Pld | W | OTW | OTL | L | GF | GA | GD | Pts |
|---|---|---|---|---|---|---|---|---|---|---|
| 1 | (Denmark) Herlev Hornets | 3 | 3 | 0 | 0 | 0 | 11 | 4 | +7 | 9 |
| 2 | (Norway) Sparta Sarpsborg | 3 | 1 | 0 | 1 | 1 | 10 | 12 | −2 | 4 |
| 3 | (United Kingdom) Sheffield Shadows | 3 | 0 | 1 | 1 | 1 | 9 | 12 | −3 | 3 |
| 4 | (Latvia) SHK Laima Riga | 3 | 0 | 1 | 0 | 2 | 6 | 8 | −2 | 2 |

- (Denmark) Herlev Hornets advanced to the second round.

==== Results ====
| Oct 28, 2011; 16:00 | Herlev Hornets (Denmark) | 5–3 (2–2, 1–0, 2–1) | (Norway) Sparta Sarpsborg | Arēna Rīga, Riga, Latvia |

Game reference

| Oct 28, 2011; 19:30 | SHK Laima Riga (Latvia) | 4–3 PS (2–2, 1–1, 0–0) | (United Kingdom) Sheffield Shadows | Arēna Rīga, Riga, Latvia |

Game reference

| Oct 29, 2011; 15:00 | Sparta Sarpsborg (Norway) | 4–5 PS (2–0, 0–2, 2–2) | (United Kingdom) Sheffield Shadows | Arēna Rīga, Riga, Latvia |

Game reference

| Oct 29, 2011; 18:30 | SHK Laima Riga (Latvia) | 0–2 (0–0, 0–1, 0–1) | (Denmark) Herlev Hornets | Arēna Rīga, Riga, Latvia |

Game reference

| Oct 30, 2011; 13:00 | Sheffield Shadows (United Kingdom) | 1–4 (0–2, 1–1, 0–1) | (Denmark) Herlev Hornets | Arēna Rīga, Riga, Latvia |

Game reference

| Oct 30, 2011; 16:30 | Sparta Sarpsborg (Norway) | 3–2 (0–0, 0–2, 3–0) | (Latvia) SHK Laima Riga | Arēna Rīga, Riga, Latvia |

Game reference

=== Group D ===
Group D was played in Spišská Nová Ves, Slovakia.

==== Standings ====
| Pos | Team | Pld | W | OTW | OTL | L | GF | GA | GD | Pts |
|---|---|---|---|---|---|---|---|---|---|---|
| 1 | (Austria) EHV Sabres | 3 | 3 | 0 | 0 | 0 | 16 | 8 | +8 | 9 |
| 2 | (Czech Republic) HC Slavia Praha | 3 | 2 | 0 | 0 | 1 | 11 | 13 | −2 | 6 |
| 3 | (Slovakia) HK Spišská Nová Ves | 3 | 0 | 1 | 0 | 2 | 6 | 12 | −6 | 2 |
| 4 | (Hungary) Budapest Stars | 3 | 0 | 0 | 1 | 2 | 12 | 12 | 0 | 1 |

- (Austria) EHV Sabres advanced to the second round.

==== Results ====
| Oct 28, 2011; 16:00 | HC Slavia Praha (Czech Republic) | 2–6 (1–1, 1–3, 0–2) | (Austria) EHV Sabres | Spiš Aréna, Spišská Nová Ves, Slovakia |

Game reference

| Oct 28, 2011; 19:00 | HK Spišská Nová Ves (Slovakia) | 3–2 PS (1–0, 0–1, 1–1) | (Hungary) Budapest Stars | Spiš Aréna, Spišská Nová Ves, Slovakia |

Game reference

| Oct 29, 2011; 15:00 | HK Spišská Nová Ves (Slovakia) | 3–5 PS (0–2, 1–2, 2–1) | (Austria) EHV Sabres | Spiš Aréna, Spišská Nová Ves, Slovakia |

Game reference

| Oct 29, 2011; 19:00 | Budapest Stars (Hungary) | 4–7 (3–3, 1–2, 0–2) | (Czech Republic) HC Slavia Praha | Spiš Aréna, Spišská Nová Ves, Slovakia |

Game reference

| Oct 30, 2011; 16:00 | HC Slavia Praha (Czech Republic) | 5–0 (2–0, 0–0, 3–0) | (Slovakia) HK Spišská Nová Ves | Spiš Aréna, Spišská Nová Ves, Slovakia |

Game reference

| Oct 30, 2011; 19:00 | EHV Sabres (Austria) | 5–3 (0–2, 1–0, 4–1) | (Hungary) Budapest Stars | Spiš Aréna, Spišská Nová Ves, Slovakia |

Game reference

== Second round ==
The second round was contested in two host cities, Hämeenlinna, Finland, and Dornbirn, Austria, during 2 to 4 December 2011.

=== Group E ===
Group E was played in Hämeenlinna, Finland.

==== Standings ====
| Pos | Team | Pld | W | OTW | OTL | L | GF | GA | GD | Pts |
|---|---|---|---|---|---|---|---|---|---|---|
| 1 | (Finland) HPK Hämeenlinna | 3 | 3 | 0 | 0 | 0 | 15 | 7 | +8 | 9 |
| 2 | (Germany) ESC Planegg | 3 | 2 | 0 | 0 | 1 | 11 | 11 | 0 | 6 |
| 3 | (Kazakhstan) Aisulu Almaty | 3 | 0 | 1 | 0 | 2 | 7 | 9 | −2 | 2 |
| 4 | (Austria) EHV Sabres | 3 | 0 | 0 | 1 | 2 | 7 | 13 | −6 | 1 |

- (Finland) HPK advanced to the final tournament.
- (Germany) ESC Planegg advanced to the final tournament.

=== Group F ===
Group F was played in Dornbirn, Austria.

==== Standings ====
| Pos | Team | Pld | W | OTW | OTL | L | GF | GA | GD | Pts |
|---|---|---|---|---|---|---|---|---|---|---|
| 1 | (Russia) HC Tornado | 3 | 3 | 0 | 0 | 0 | 18 | 3 | +15 | 9 |
| 2 | (Switzerland) ZSC Lions Frauen | 3 | 2 | 0 | 0 | 1 | 13 | 5 | +8 | 6 |
| 3 | (France) Brûleurs de Loups de Grenoble | 3 | 1 | 0 | 0 | 2 | 3 | 6 | −3 | 3 |
| 4 | (Denmark) Herlev Hornets | 3 | 0 | 0 | 0 | 3 | 3 | 23 | −20 | 0 |

- (Russia) HC Tornado advanced to the final tournament.
- (Switzerland) ZSC Lions Frauen advanced to the final tournament.

== Final round ==
The final round was contested from 24 to 26 February 2012 and was played in Hämeenlinna, Finland.

| Pos | Team | Pld | W | OTW | OTL | L | GF | GA | GD | Pts |
|---|---|---|---|---|---|---|---|---|---|---|
| 1 | (Russia) HC Tornado | 3 | 2 | 1 | 0 | 0 | 11 | 7 | +4 | 8 |
| 2 | (Switzerland) ZSC Lions Frauen | 3 | 1 | 1 | 0 | 1 | 10 | 9 | +1 | 5 |
| 3 | (Finland) HPK Hämeenlinna | 3 | 0 | 1 | 2 | 0 | 10 | 11 | −1 | 4 |
| 4 | (Germany) ESC Planegg | 3 | 0 | 0 | 1 | 2 | 1 | 5 | −4 | 1 |

== Statistics ==
=== Best Players selected by the directorate ===
| Award | No. | Player | Team |
|---|---|---|---|
| Best Goalkeeper | 1 | Anna Vanhatalo (FIN) | (Switzerland) ZSC Lions Frauen |
| Best Defenseman | 90 | Inna Dyubanok (RUS) | (Russia) Tornado Moscow Region |
| Best Forward | 11 | Melissa Jaques (CAN) | (Russia) Tornado Moscow Region |
