= 2008–09 IIHF European Women's Champions Cup =

International ice hockey club tournament

Tournament details
- Host countries: Finland; Czech Republic; Sweden; Italy; Lithuania; Russia
- Dates: Round 1; 24–26 October 2008; 31 October–2 November 2008; Round 2; 5–7 December 2008; Finals; 30 January–2 February 2009
- Format: Round-robin

Final positions
- Champions: (Russia) SKIF Nizhny Novgorod (1st title)
- Runners-up: (Sweden) Segeltorps IF
- Third place: (Finland) Espoo Blues
- Fourth place: (Kazakhstan) Aisulu Almaty

Tournament statistics
- Scoring leader(s): Finals; Josefine Jakobsen, Segeltorps IF (6 points)

The 2008–09 IIHF European Women's Champions Cup was the fifth holding of the IIHF European Women Champions Cup (EWCC). Russian team SKIF Nizhny Novgorod of the Russian Women's Hockey League won the tournament for the first time, ending the four-year championship reign of Swedish team AIK Hockey.

== First round ==
=== Group A ===
Pos	Team	Pld	W	OTW	OTL	L	GF	GA	GD	Pts
1	(Czech Republic) HC Slavia Praha	3	3	0	0	0	71	0	+71	9
2	(Slovenia) Terme Maribor	3	2	0	0	1	23	9	+14	6
3	(Turkey) Polis Akademisi Ankara	3	1	0	0	2	5	43	−38	3
4	(Hungary) Ferencvárosi TC Budapest	3	0	0	0	3	0	47	−47	0

=== Group B ===
Pos	Team	Pld	W	OTW	OTL	L	GF	GA	GD	Pts
1	(Germany) ESC Planegg/Würmtal	3	3	0	0	0	28	4	+24	9
2	(Austria) SG Sabres/Flyers United Wien	3	2	0	0	1	15	7	+8	6
3	(Italy) Agordo Hockey	3	1	0	0	2	14	23	−9	3
4	(Croatia) KHL Grič Zagreb	3	0	0	0	3	3	26	−23	0

=== Group C ===
Pos	Team	Pld	W	OTW	OTL	L	GF	GA	GD	Pts
1	(Denmark) Herlev Hornets	3	3	0	0	0	16	7	+9	9
2	(Latvia) SHK Laima Riga	3	1	0	1	1	8	9	−1	4
3	(Norway) Vålerenga Oslo	3	1	0	0	2	7	11	−4	3
4	(United Kingdom) Slough Phantoms	3	0	1	0	2	12	16	−4	2

=== Group D ===
Pos	Team	Pld	W	OTW	OTL	L	GF	GA	GD	Pts
1	(Russia) SKIF Nizhny Novgorod	2	2	0	0	0	34	0	+34	6
2	(France) HC Cergy-Pontoise	2	1	0	0	1	13	10	+3	3
3	(Romania) SC Miercurea Ciuc	2	0	0	0	2	0	37	−37	0
4	(Slovakia) HC Slovan Bratislava (W)	0	0	0	0	0	0	0	0	0

(W) Withdrew

== Second round ==
=== Group E ===
Pos	Team	Pld	W	OTW	OTL	L	GF	GA	GD	Pts
1	(Finland) Espoo Blues	3	3	0	0	0	20	1	+19	9
2	(Kazakhstan) Aisulu Almaty	3	2	0	0	1	14	8	+6	6
3	(Czech Republic) HC Slavia Praha	3	1	0	0	2	13	6	+7	3
4	(Denmark) Herlev Hornets	3	0	0	0	3	2	34	−32	0

=== Group F ===
Pos	Team	Pld	W	OTW	OTL	L	GF	GA	GD	Pts
1	(Russia) SKIF Nizhny Novgorod	3	3	0	0	0	18	2	+16	9
2	(Sweden) Segeltorps IF	3	2	0	0	1	10	10	0	6
3	(Switzerland) DHC Langenthal	3	1	0	0	2	7	11	−4	3
4	(Germany) ESC Planegg/Würmtal	3	0	0	0	3	7	19	−12	0

== Super Final ==
Pos	Team	Pld	W	OTW	OTL	L	GF	GA	GD	Pts
1	(Russia) SKIF Nizhny Novgorod	3	3	0	0	0	11	4	+7	9
2	(Sweden) Segeltorps IF	3	2	0	0	1	11	4	+7	6
3	(Finland) Espoo Blues	3	1	0	0	2	6	11	−5	3
4	(Kazakhstan) Aisulu Almaty	3	0	0	0	3	4	13	−9	0
