= Rebecca Fiorese =

Italian ice hockey player

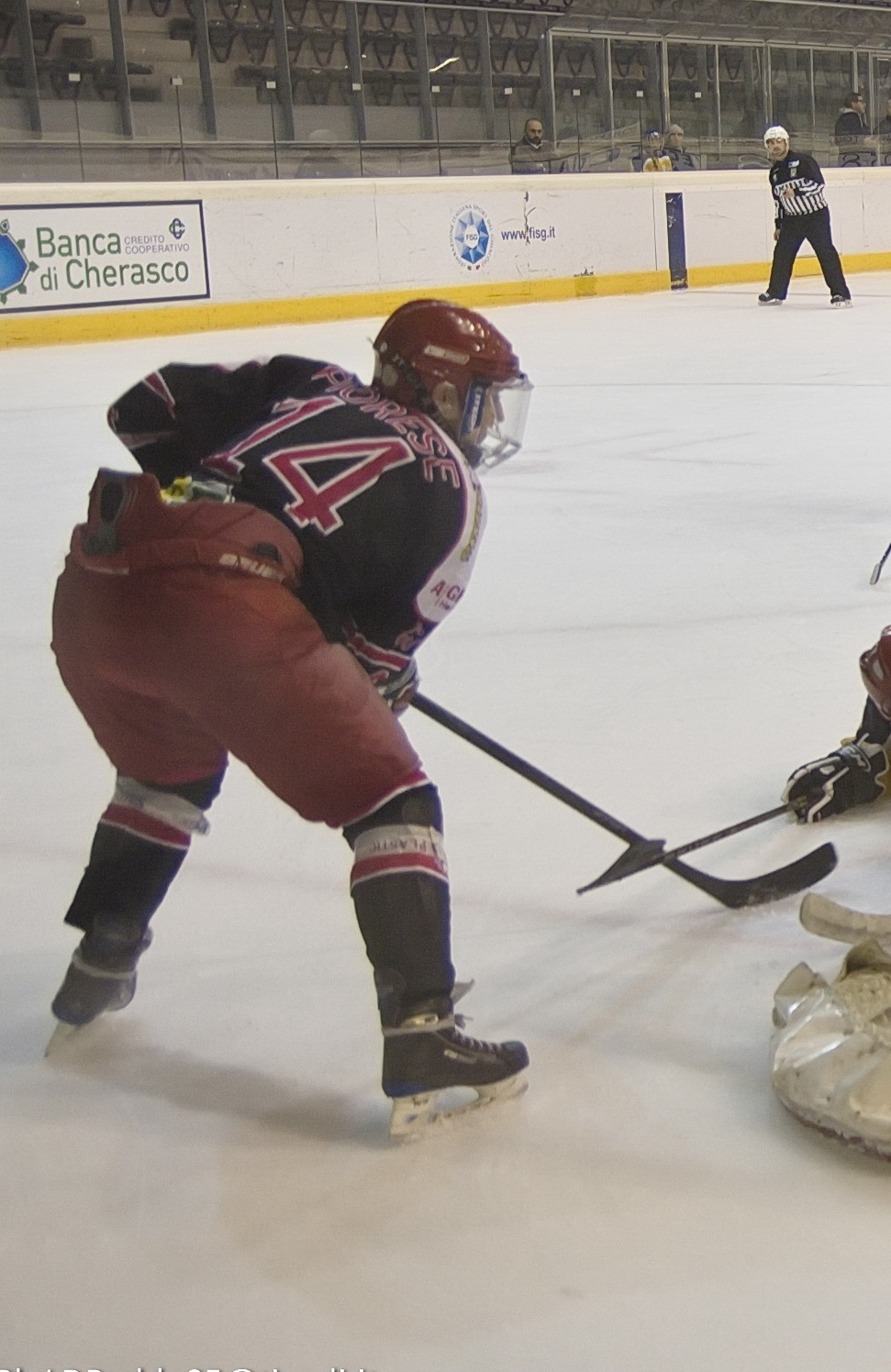

Personal information
- Nationality: Italian
- Born: 4 September 1980 (age 44); Milan, Italy

Sport
- Sport: Ice hockey

Rebecca Fiorese (born 4 September 1980) is an Italian ice hockey player. She competed in the women's tournament at the 2006 Winter Olympics.
