= 2012–13 IIHF European Women's Champions Cup =

International ice hockey club tournament

2012-2013 IIHF European Women's Champions Cup
Tournament details
- Host countries: Italy; Belarus; Sweden; Austria; Switzerland; Finland
- Venues: 6 (in 6 host cities)
- Dates: Oct 5, 2012 – Feb 24, 2013
- Teams: 20

Final positions
- Champions: (Russia) HC Tornado (3rd title)
- Runners-up: (Sweden) MODO Hockey
- Third place: (Finland) Oulun Kärpät
- Fourth place: (Switzerland) ZSC Lions Frauen

The 2012–13 IIHF European Women's Champions Cup was the ninth playing of the IIHF European Women's Champions Cup. HC Tornado of Russia's Women's Hockey League won the tournament for the third time in four seasons and second consecutive time.

== First round ==
The first round was contested from 5 to 22 October 2012

=== Group A ===
Group A was played in Bolzano, Italy.

==== Standings ====
Pos	Team	Pld	W	OTW	OTL	L	GF	GA	GD	Pts
1	(Italy) Bolzano Eagles	3	3	0	0	0	22	4	+18	9
2	(France) HC Neuilly-sur-Marne	3	2	0	0	1	24	10	+14	6
3	(Croatia) KHL Grič Zagreb	3	0	1	0	2	10	24	−14	2
4	(Spain) Valladolid Panteras	3	0	0	1	2	5	23	−18	1

- (Italy) Bolzano Eagles advanced to the second round.

==== Results ====
Oct 05, 2012; 15:00	HC Neuilly-sur-Marne (France)	12–5 (3–0, 4–2, 5–3)	(Croatia) KHL Grič Zagreb	Ice Arena Palaonda, Bolzano, Italy

Game reference

Oct 05, 2012; 20:00	Valladolid Panteras (Spain)	1–9 (1–4, 0–4, 0–1)	(Italy) Bolzano Eagles	Ice Arena Palaonda, Bolzano, Italy

Game reference

Oct 06, 2012; 15:00	HC Neuilly-sur-Marne (France)	10–1 (1–0, 5–1, 4–0)	(Spain) Valladolid Panteras	Ice Arena Palaonda, Bolzano, Italy

Game reference

Oct 06, 2012; 20:00	Bolzano Eagles (Italy)	9–1 (2–0, 3–1, 4–0)	(Croatia) KHL Grič Zagreb	Ice Arena Palaonda, Bolzano, Italy

Game reference

Oct 07, 2012; 14:00	KHL Grič Zagreb (Croatia)	4–3 PS (1–1, 2–2, 0–0)	(Spain) Valladolid Panteras	Ice Arena Palaonda, Bolzano, Italy

Game reference

Oct 07, 2012; 18:00	Bolzano Eagles (Italy)	4–2 (1–0, 2–1, 1–1)	(France) HC Neuilly-sur-Marne	Ice Arena Palaonda, Bolzano, Italy

Game reference

=== Group B ===
Group B was played in Molodechno, Belarus.

==== Standings ====
Pos	Team	Pld	W	OTW	OTL	L	GF	GA	GD	Pts
1	(Kazakhstan) Aisulu Almaty	3	3	0	0	0	25	1	+24	9
2	(Belarus) HK Pantera Minsk	3	2	0	0	1	48	6	+42	6
3	(Romania) SC Miercurea Ciuc	3	1	0	0	2	9	36	−27	3
4	(Turkey) Milenyum Ankara	3	0	0	0	3	2	41	−39	0

- (Kazakhstan) Aisulu Almaty advanced to the second round.

==== Schedule ====
Oct 19, 2012	Aisulu Almaty (Kazakhstan)	12 – 0 (7–0, 4–0, 1–0)	(Romania) SC Miercurea Ciuc	Ice Palace, Molodechno, Belarus

Game reference

Oct 19, 2012; 19:00	Milenyum Ankara (Turkey)	0 – 25 (0–13, 0–3, 0–9)	(Belarus) HK Pantera Minsk	Ice Palace, Molodechno, Belarus

Game reference

Oct 20, 2012; 15:30	Aisulu Almaty (Kazakhstan)	7 – 0 (4–0, 1–0, 2–0)	(Turkey) Milenyum Ankara	Ice Palace, Molodechno, Belarus

Game reference

Oct 20, 2012; 19:00	HK Pantera Minsk (Belarus)	22 – 0 (8–0, 10–0, 4–0)	(Romania) SC Miercurea Ciuc	Ice Palace, Molodechno, Belarus

Game reference

Oct 21, 2012; 15:30	SC Miercurea Ciuc (Romania)	9 – 2 (2–0, 2–2, 5–0)	(Turkey) Milenyum Ankara	Ice Palace, Molodechno, Belarus

Game reference

Oct 21, 2012; 19:00	HK Pantera Minsk (Belarus)	1 – 6 (0–3, 1–2, 0–1)	(Kazakhstan) Aisulu Almaty	Ice Palace, Molodechno, Belarus

Game reference

=== Group C ===
Group C was played in Örnsköldsvik, Sweden.

==== Standings ====
Pos	Team	Pld	W	OTW	OTL	L	GF	GA	GD	Pts
1	(Sweden) MODO Hockey	3	3	0	0	0	20	0	+20	9
2	(Denmark) Hvidovre	3	2	0	0	1	6	9	−3	6
3	(Norway) Vålerenga Oslo	3	1	0	0	2	6	11	−5	3
4	(Latvia) Laima Riga	3	0	0	0	3	3	15	−12	0

- (Sweden) MODO Hockey advanced to the second round.

==== Schedule ====
Oct 20, 2012; 14:00	Hvidovre (Denmark)	0–6 (0–1, 0–3, 0–2)	(Sweden) MODO Hockey	Fjällräven Center, Örnsköldsvik, Sweden

Game reference

Oct 20, 2012; 18:00	Vålerenga Oslo (Norway)	4–2 (0–2, 1–0, 3–0)	(Latvia) Laima Riga	Fjällräven Center, Örnsköldsvik, Sweden

Game reference

Oct 21, 2012; 14:00	Laima Riga (Latvia)	1–3 (1–0, 0–0, 3–0)	(Denmark) Hvidovre	Fjällräven Center, Örnsköldsvik, Sweden

Game reference

Oct 21, 2012; 18:00	MODO Hockey (Sweden)	6–0 (2–0, 3–0, 1–0)	(Norway) Vålerenga Oslo	Fjällräven Center, Örnsköldsvik, Sweden

Game reference

Oct 22, 2012; 11:00	Vålerenga Oslo (Norway)	2–3 (1–0, 1–2, 0–1)	(Denmark) Hvidovre	Fjällräven Center, Örnsköldsvik, Sweden

Game reference

Oct 22, 2012; 18:00	MODO Hockey (Sweden)	8–0 (2–0, 3–0, 3–0)	(Latvia) Laima Riga	Fjällräven Center, Örnsköldsvik, Sweden

Game reference

=== Group D ===
Group D was played in Vienna, Austria.

==== Standings ====
Pos	Team	Pld	W	OTW	OTL	L	GF	GA	GD	Pts
1	(Czech Republic) HC Slavia Praha	3	3	0	0	0	17	4	+13	9
2	(Austria) EHV Sabres	3	2	0	0	1	31	3	+28	6
3	(Slovakia) HK Poprad	3	1	0	0	2	5	21	−16	3
4	(Poland) TMH Polonia Bytom	3	0	0	0	3	5	30	−25	0

- (Czech Republic) HC Slavia Praha advanced to the second round.

==== Schedule ====
Oct 19, 2012; 15:00	HC Slavia Praha (Czech Republic)	11–4 (1–0, 5–1, 5–3)	(Poland) TMH Polonia Bytom	Albert Schultz Eishalle, Vienna, Austria

Game reference

Oct 19, 2012; 18:00	EHV Sabres (Austria)	16–1 (6–0, 6–1, 4–0)	(Slovakia) HK Poprad	Albert Schultz Eishalle, Vienna, Austria

Game reference

Oct 20, 2012; 15:00	HK Poprad (Slovakia)	4–1 (2–1, 1–0, 1–0)	(Poland) TMH Polonia Bytom	Albert Schultz Eishalle, Vienna, Austria

Game reference

Oct 20, 2012; 18:00	EHV Sabres (Austria)	0–2 (0–1, 0–0, 0–1)	(Czech Republic) HC Slavia Praha	Albert Schultz Eishalle, Vienna, Austria

Game reference

Oct 21, 2012; 15:00	HC Slavia Praha (Czech Republic)	4–0 (2–0, 0–0, 2–0)	(Slovakia) HK Poprad	Albert Schultz Eishalle, Vienna, Austria

Game reference

Oct 21, 2012; 18:00	TMH Polonia Bytom (Poland)	0–15 (0–6, 0–3, 0–6)	(Austria) EHV Sabres	Albert Schultz Eishalle, Vienna, Austria

Game reference

== Second round ==
The first round was contested from 2 to 4 December 2011

=== Group E ===
Group E was played in Dornbirn, Austria.

==== Standings ====
Pos	Team	Pld	W	OTW	OTL	L	GF	GA	GD	Pts
1	(Sweden) MODO Hockey	3	3	0	0	0	21	5	+16	9
2	(Switzerland) ZSC Lions Frauen	3	2	0	0	1	14	4	+10	6
3	(Germany) ESC Planegg	3	1	0	0	2	16	13	+3	3
4	(Italy) Bolzano Eagles	3	0	0	0	3	1	30	−29	0

- (Sweden) MODO Hockey advanced to the final round.
- (Switzerland) ZSC Lions Frauen advanced to the final round.

==== Schedule ====
Dec 7, 2012; 12:00	Bolzano Eagles (Italy)	0–10 (0–3, 0–3, 0–4)	(Sweden) MODO Hockey	Messestadion, Dornbirn, Austria

Game reference

Dec 7, 2012; 15:30	ZSC Lions Frauen (Switzerland)	4–1 (0–0, 3–1, 1–0)	(Germany) ESC Planegg	Messestadion, Dornbirn, Austria

Game reference

Dec 8, 2012; 12:00	ESC Planegg (Germany)	12–1 (6–1, 5–0, 1–0)	(Italy) Bolzano Eagles	Messestadion, Dornbirn, Austria

Game reference

Dec 8, 2012; 15:30	MODO Hockey (Sweden)	3–2 (1–1, 0–1, 2–0)	(Switzerland) ZSC Lions Frauen	Messestadion, Dornbirn, Austria

Game reference

Dec 09, 2012; 12:00	ESC Planegg (Germany)	3–8 (1–2, 0–4, 2–2)	(Sweden) MODO Hockey	Messestadion, Dornbirn, Austria

Game reference

Dec 9, 2012; 15:30	ZSC Lions Frauen (Switzerland)	8–0 (5–0, 3–0, 0–0)	(Italy) Bolzano Eagles	Messestadion, Dornbirn, Austria

Game reference

=== Group F ===
Group F was played in Oulu, Finland.

==== Standings ====
Pos	Team	Pld	W	OTW	OTL	L	GF	GA	GD	Pts
1	(Russia) HC Tornado	3	3	0	0	0	17	4	+13	9
2	(Finland) Oulun Kärpät	3	2	0	0	1	8	7	+1	6
3	(Kazakhstan) Aisulu Almaty	3	1	0	0	2	6	10	−4	3
4	(Czech Republic) HC Slavia Praha	3	0	0	0	3	2	12	−10	0

- (Russia) HC Tornado advanced to the final round.
- (Finland) Oulun Kärpät advanced to the final round.

==== Schedule ====
Dec 7, 2012; 16:00	HC Tornado (Russia)	6–1 (2–0, 2–0, 2–1)	(Kazakhstan) Aisulu Almaty	Oulun Jäähalli, Oulu, Finland

Game reference

Dec 7, 2012; 19:30	Oulun Kärpät (Finland)	3–0 (3–0, 0–0, 0–0)	(Czech Republic) HC Slavia Praha	Oulun Jäähalli, Oulu, Finland

Game reference

Dec 8, 2012; 15:00	Aisulu Almaty (Kazakhstan)	2–0 (0–0, 1–0, 1–0)	(Czech Republic) HC Slavia Praha	Oulun Jäähalli, Oulu, Finland

Game reference

Dec 8, 2012; 18:30	Oulun Kärpät (Finland)	1–4 (0–1, 0–1, 1–2)	(Russia) HC Tornado	Oulun Jäähalli, Oulu, Finland

Game reference

Dec 09, 2012; 12:00	HC Tornado (Russia)	7–2 (1–0, 3–1, 3–1)	(Czech Republic) HC Slavia Praha	Oulun Jäähalli, Oulu, Finland

Game reference

Dec 9, 2012; 15:30	Aisulu Almaty (Kazakhstan)	3–4 (1–1, 1–1, 1–2)	(Finland) Oulun Kärpät	Oulun Jäähalli, Oulu, Finland

Game reference

== Final round ==
The final round was hosted in Oulu, Finland, and played during 22–24 February 2013. The top two teams of each second-round group advanced to the final tournament.

Pos	Team	Pld	W	OTW	OTL	L	GF	GA	GD	Pts
1	(Russia) HC Tornado (C)	3	2	1	0	0	11	4	+7	8
2	(Sweden) MODO Hockey	3	2	0	0	1	8	8	0	6
3	(Finland) Oulun Kärpät	3	1	0	0	2	7	12	−5	3
4	(Switzerland) ZSC Lions Frauen	3	0	0	1	2	5	9	−4	1

(C) Champion

Feb 22, 2013; 15:00	HC Tornado (Russia)	3–2 OT (1–0, 1–0, 0–2, 1–0)	(Switzerland) ZSC Lions Frauen	Oulun Jäähalli, Oulu, Finland

Game reference

Feb 22, 2013; 18:30	Oulun Kärpät (Finland)	2–5 (0–2, 0–2, 2–1)	(Sweden) MODO Hockey	Oulun Jäähalli, Oulu, Finland

Game reference

Feb 23, 2013; 14:00	HC Tornado (Russia)	5–0 (1–0, 2–0, 2–0)	(Sweden) MODO Hockey	Oulun Jäähalli, Oulu, Finland

Game reference

Feb 23, 2013; 17:30	ZSC Lions Frauen (Switzerland)	2–3 (0–0, 1–1, 1–2)	(Finland) Oulun Kärpät	Oulun Jäähalli, Oulu, Finland

Game reference

Feb 24, 2013; 12:00	MODO Hockey (Sweden)	3–1 (1–0, 1–0, 1–1)	(Switzerland) ZSC Lions Frauen	Oulun Jäähalli, Oulu, Finland

Game reference

Feb 24, 2013; 15:30	Oulun Kärpät (Finland)	2–5 (0–1, 1–3, 1–1)	(Russia) HC Tornado	Oulun Jäähalli, Oulu, Finland

Game reference

=== Best Players selected by the directorate ===
Award	No.	Name	Team
Best Goalkeeper	35	Zuzana Tomčíková	(Russia) HC Tornado
Best Defenseman	36	Malin Sjögren	(Sweden) MODO Hockey
Best Forward	26	Anne Helin	(Finland) Oulun Kärpät
