= Aisulu Almaty =

EWHL ice hockey team in Almaty, Kazakhstan

Aisulu Almaty Aysulu Almatı Айсұлу Алматы
- City: Almaty, Kazakhstan
- League: European Women's Hockey League; Qyzdar Hokei Ligasy
- Founded: 2004
- Home arena: Baluan Sholak Sports Palace
- Colours: Orange, navy, white, black
- General manager: Yekaterina Skobelkina
- Head coach: Alexandr Maltsev
- Captain: Madina Tursynova
- Affiliate: Aisulu Tandauly

Franchise history
- 2004–2005: DSHNK Almaty
- 2005–: Aisulu Almaty

Championships
- EWHL Championship: 1 (2025)
- Kazakh Championship: 19 (2004, 2005, 2006, 2007, 2008, 2009, 2010, 2011, 2012, 2013, 2014, 2015, 2018, 2019, 2020, 2021, 2022, 2024, 2025)

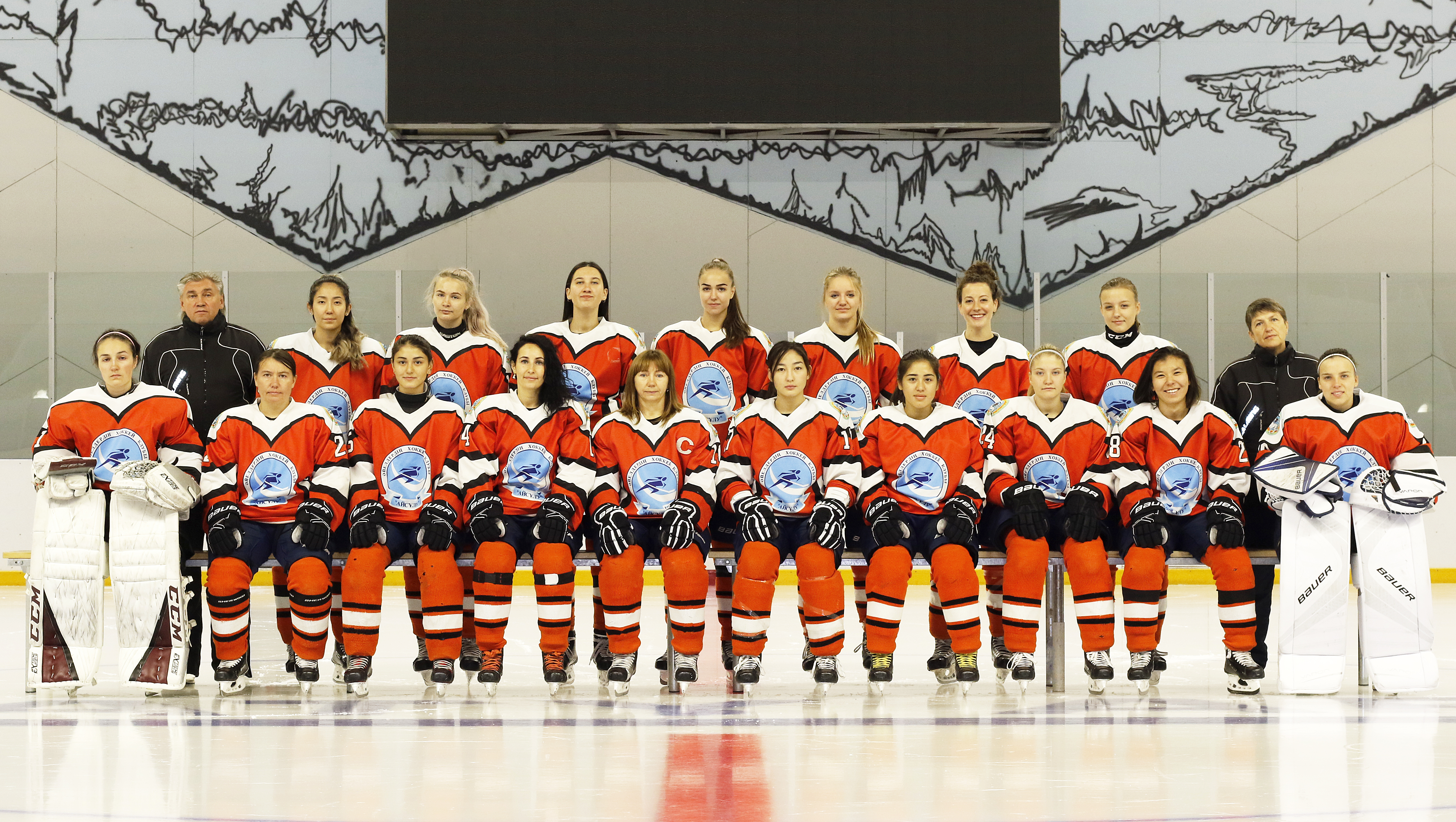
2019–20 Aisulu Almaty team

Aisulu Almaty (Kazakh: Айсұлу Алматы, Aysulu Almatı; Russian: Айсулу Алматы, Айсулу Алма-Ата) are a professional ice hockey team in the European Women's Hockey League (EWHL) and Qyzdar Hokei Ligasy. They play in Almaty, Kazakhstan, at the Baluan Sholak Sports Palace. The team participated in every holding of the IIHF European Women Champions Cup, from 2004 until its scheduled stoppage in 2015, winning bronze at the 2008 tournament. They have competed in the EWHL since the 2015–16 season and placed third in the league in 2016 and 2020.

The club also operates a farm team, Aisulu Tandauly, which plays in Group B of the Qyzdar Hokei Ligasy.

== Season-by-season record ==
Season	Kazakhstan Women Hockey Championship	IIHF European Women Champions Cup
2007–08	Champion	Placed 1st in Group A in the first round Placed 1st in Group E in the second round Placed 3rd in the Super Final
2008–09	Champion	Placed 2nd in Group E in the second round Placed 4th in the Super Final
2009–10	Champion	Placed 3rd in Group E
2010–11	Champion	Placed 1st in Group F Placed 4th in Final Round
2011–12	Champion	Placed 3rd in Group E
2011–12	Champion	Placed 1st in Group B in the first round Placed 3rd in Group F in the second round

The coat of arms of Almaty appears on the shoulders of the team jersey

== Players and personnel ==
=== 2024–25 roster ===
As of 4 April 2025

No.	Nat	Player	Pos	S/G	Age	Acquired	Birthplace
5	(Kazakhstan)	Malika Aldabergenova	F	L	27	2015	
7	(Kazakhstan)	Pernesh Ashimova	F	L	29	2023	
12	(Canada)	Kendra Broad	F	R	34	2019	Petrolia, Ontario, Canada
11	(Russia)	Yelizaveta Dyundina	F	L	27	2022	Pervouralsk, Sverdlovsk Oblast, Russia
8	(Canada)	Elisa Erhardt	F	L	22	2024	Penticton, British Columbia, Canada
27	(Kazakhstan)	Azhar Hamimuldinova	D	L	32	2022	
16	(Canada)	Mariah Hinds	D	L	26	2023	Vaughan, Ontario, Canada
19	(Kazakhstan)	Alina Ivanchenko	F	R	24	2018	
23	(Kazakhstan)	Tatyana Koroleva	F	R	39	2015	
13	(Canada)	Cassidy Maplethorpe	F	L	25	2024	Wetaskiwin, Alberta, Canada
22	(Hungary)	Bernadett Németh	D	L	29	2024	Budapest, Central Hungary, Hungary
17	(Kazakhstan)	Aida Olzhabaeva	D	L	28	2016	
15	(Kazakhstan)	Anna Pyatkova	D	L	24	2020	
38	(Canada)	Roxanne Rioux	F	L	31	2019	Saint-Jean-de-Dieu, Quebec, Canada
1	(Russia)	Alexandra Safonova	G	L	25	2023	Saint Petersburg, Russia
20	(Canada)	Rachel Seeley	G	L	27	2023	Ottawa, Ontario, Canada
2	(Russia)	Olga Shirokova	F	L	25	2023	Dedovsk, Moscow Oblast, Russia
14	(Kazakhstan)	Larisa Sviridova	F	L	40	2017	
26	(Canada)	Breanne Trotter	F	R	25	2024	Okotoks, Alberta, Canada
9	(Kazakhstan)	Madina Tursynova	F	L	29	2016	
4	(United States)	Alicia Williams	F	L	28	2022	Virginia, Minnesota, United States

Coaching staff and team personnel

- Head coach: Alexandr Maltsev
- Assistant coach: Natalya Skobelkina
- Assistant coach: Sergey Solovyov
