= 2009–10 IIHF European Women's Champions Cup =

International ice hockey club tournament

Tournament details
- Host countries: Germany; Austria; Czech Republic; Italy; Latvia
- Venues: 6 (in 6 host cities)
- Dates: Round 1; 30 October–1 November 2009; Round 2; 4–6 December 2009; Finals; 12–14 March 2010
- Format: Round-robin

Final positions
- Champions: (Russia) Tornado Moscow Region (1st title)
- Runners-up: (Finland) Espoo Blues
- Third place: (Germany) OSC Berlin
- Fourth place: (Czech Republic) Slavia Prague

Tournament statistics
- Scoring leader(s): Finals; Yekaterina Smolentseva, Tornado Moscow Region (9 points)

The 2009–10 IIHF European Women's Champions Cup was the sixth holding of the IIHF European Women Champions Cup (EWCC). Tornado Moscow Region of the Russian Women's Hockey League won the tournament for the first time, becoming the second consecutive Russian team to claim the title.

== First round ==
=== Group A ===
Pos	Team	Pld	W	OTW	OTL	L	GF	GA	GD	Pts
1	(Germany) OSC Berlin	3	2	1	0	0	37	5	+32	8
2	(Austria) EC Ravens Salzburg	3	2	0	1	0	34	5	+29	7
3	(Denmark) Herlev Hornets	3	1	0	0	2	23	13	+10	3
4	(Bulgaria) HC Slavia Sofia	3	0	0	0	3	0	71	−71	0

=== Group B ===
Pos	Team	Pld	W	OTW	OTL	L	GF	GA	GD	Pts
1	(Latvia) SHK Laima Riga	3	3	0	0	0	12	2	+10	9
2	(Norway) Sparta Sarpsborg	3	2	0	0	1	14	5	+9	6
3	(United Kingdom) Sheffield Shadows	3	1	0	0	2	7	9	−2	3
4	(Spain) Valladolid Panteras	3	0	0	0	3	4	21	−17	0

=== Group C ===
Pos	Team	Pld	W	OTW	OTL	L	GF	GA	GD	Pts
1	(Czech Republic) HC Slavia Praha	3	3	0	0	0	31	1	+30	9
2	(Slovenia) Terme Maribor	3	2	0	0	1	13	9	+4	6
3	(Slovakia) MHK Martin	3	1	0	0	2	11	14	−3	3
4	(Turkey) Milenyum Ankara	3	0	0	0	3	5	36	−31	0

=== Group D ===
Pos	Team	Pld	W	OTW	OTL	L	GF	GA	GD	Pts
1	(Italy) Agordo Hockey	3	3	0	0	0	23	2	+21	9
2	(France) HC Cergy-Pontoise	3	2	0	0	1	18	7	+11	6
3	(Hungary) UTE Marilyn Budapest	3	0	1	0	2	3	17	−14	2
4	(Romania) SC Miercurea Ciuc	3	0	0	1	2	2	20	−18	1

== Second round ==
=== Group E ===
Pos	Team	Pld	W	OTW	OTL	L	GF	GA	GD	Pts
1	(Finland) Espoo Blues	3	3	0	0	0	18	9	+9	9
2	(Germany) OSC Berlin	3	2	0	0	1	14	6	+8	6
3	(Kazakhstan) Aisulu Almaty	3	1	0	0	2	10	7	+3	3
4	(Italy) Agordo Hockey	3	0	0	0	3	6	26	−20	0

=== Group F ===
Pos	Team	Pld	W	OTW	OTL	L	GF	GA	GD	Pts
1	(Russia) HC Tornado	3	2	1	0	0	16	6	+10	8
2	(Czech Republic) HC Slavia Praha	3	2	0	0	1	17	11	+6	6
3	(Switzerland) HC Lugano	3	1	0	1	1	16	11	+5	4
4	(Latvia) SHK Laima Riga	3	0	0	0	3	1	22	−21	0

== Super Final ==
Pos	Team	Pld	W	OTW	OTL	L	GF	GA	GD	Pts
1	(Russia) HC Tornado	3	3	0	0	0	22	5	+17	9
2	(Finland) Espoo Blues	3	1	0	0	2	10	10	0	3
3	(Germany) OSC Berlin	3	1	0	0	2	5	12	−7	3
4	(Czech Republic) HC Slavia Praha	3	1	0	0	2	8	18	−10	3
