= TPS Naiset =

Ice hockey team in Turku, Finland

Turun Palloseura Naiset
- City: Turku, Finland
- League: Auroraliiga
- Founded: 1990
- Home arena: Kupittaan jäähalli
- Colours: Black, white
- Head coach: Tony Suoniemi
- Captain: Peppi Kähkönen
- Parent club: TPS Juniorijääkiekko ry
- Website: Official website

Current uniform
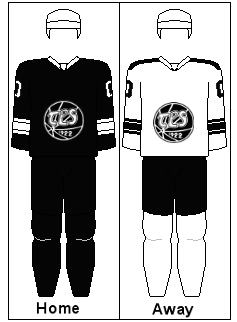

Turun Palloseura Naiset (lit. 'Turku's Ball Association Women'), abbreviated TPS Naiset, are an ice hockey team in the Finnish Auroraliiga. They play in Turku, Southwest Finland at Kupittaan jäähalli. The team has played in the Auroraliiga, the Finnish Championship league for women's ice hockey, since gaining promotion from the Naisten Mestis in the 2019 postseason.

The team previously operated two junior affiliates, TPS Akatemia and TPS Challenger, both of which most recently played in the 2025–26 season of the Naisten Suomi-sarja, the third-tier national league.

== Season-by-season results ==
This is a partial list of the most recent seasons completed by TPS Naiset.
Note: Finish = Rank at end of regular season; GP = Games played, W = Wins (3 points), OTW = Overtime wins (2 points), T = Tied games, OTL = Overtime losses (1 point), L = Losses, GF = Goals for, GA = Goals against, Pts = Points, Top scorer: Points (Goals+Assists); Mestis Q = Mestis qualifiers

Season	League	Preliminaries and regular season											Postseason results
Season	League	Finish	GP	W	OTW	T	OTL	L	GF	GA	Pts	Top scorer	Postseason results
2015–16	Naisten Mestis Q	4th in Lohko 3	8	2	–	1	–	5	20	60	5	(Finland) H. Brofelt 6 (2+4)	
2015–16	Naisten Suomi-sarja	4th	12	5	–	3	–	4	47	38	13	(Finland) S. Seppälä 11 (6+5)	Third place in Naisten Suomi-sarja Final Four
2016–17	Naisten Mestis Q	5th in Lohko 4	12	3	–	3	–	6	30	39	9	(Finland) P. Koskinen 15 (11+4)	
2016–17	Naisten Suomi-sarja	1st	10	9	–	0	–	1	58	13	18	(Finland) P. Koskinen 32 (18+14)	Fourth place in Naisten Mestis Final Four
2017–18	Naisten Mestis	1st	30	22	3	–	0	5	84	30	72	(Finland) M. Otamo 77 (45+32)	Promoted to Naisten Liiga
2018–19	Naisten Liiga	7th	30	10	1	–	0	19	71	162	32	(Finland) S. Tapani 32 (24+8)	Saved in relegation
2019–20	Naisten Liiga	9th	30	5	4	–	2	19	61	110	25	(Finland) U. Udeh 23 (18+5)	Relegation series cancelled due to COVID-19 pandemic
2020–21	Naisten Liiga	6th	27	11	2	–	2	12	91	97	39	(France) E. Duvin 44 (22+22)	Lost quarterfinals to HIFK, 0–2
2021–22	Naisten Liiga	5th	29	10	3	–	2	14	101	108	38	(France) E. Duvin 57 (31+26)	Lost bronze medal game to Kärpät, 2–3
2022–23	Naisten Liiga	7th	36	14	2	–	3	17	124	140	49	(Finland) P. Salonen 40 (23+17)	Lost quarterfinals to KalPa, 0–3
2023–24	Naisten Liiga	8th	32	5	3	–	2	22	59	133	23	(Finland) S. Viitala 27 (14+13)	Lost quarterfinals to K-Espoo, 0–3
2024–25	Auroraliiga	7th	32	9	3	–	3	17	66	99	36	(Finland) E. Ilvonen 25 (8+17)	Lost quarterfinals to HPK, 1–3
2025–26	Auroraliiga	6th	32	10	3	–	1	18	101	93	37	(Finland) M. Koski 27 (14+13)	Lost quarterfinals to HIFK, 1–3

== Players and personnel ==
=== 2026–27 roster ===
As of 28 September 2026

No.	Nat	Player	Pos	S/G	Age	Acquired	Birthplace
88	(Finland)	Vilma Ake	D	L	16	2026	
22	(Finland)	Aada Antila	F	L	19	2026	
8	(United States)	Keira Bolt (A)	D	L	22	2026	Boise, Idaho, United States
7	(United States)	Ava Bullert (A)	F	R	22	2026	North Oaks, Minnesota, United States
29	(Finland)	Nella Elo	F	L	16	2026	
77	(Finland)	Iida Elomaa	D	L	17	2024	Loimaa, Southwest Finland, Finland
16	(Finland)	Minttu Haapasalo	F	L	19	2026	Kotka, Kymenlaakso, Finland
28	(Canada)	Julia Jackson	F	L	24	2026	Uxbridge, Ontario, Canada
11	(Lithuania)	Gabija Jaroševičiūtė	D	L	17	2026	
33	(Finland)	Matilda Kleimola	G	L	17	2026	
24	(Finland)	Nella Korpela (A)	F	L	22	2024	Soini, South Ostrobothnia, Finland
18	(Finland)	Fiina Kotilainen	F	L	16	2026	
26	(Finland)	Peppi Kähkönen (C)	F	L	24	2024	Espoo, Uusimaa, Finland
34	(Finland)	Emmi Laitajärvi	G	L	19	2024	
17	(Finland)	Siiri Lepola	D	R	18	2026	
15	(Finland)	Annika Marjatsalo	F	L	19	2026	
23	(Canada)	Ashley McCutcheon	F	L	24	2026	Kitchener, Ontario, Canada
20	(Finland)	Kiia Narinen	F	L	23	2026	Lappeenranta, South Karelia, Finland
9	(Finland)	Vilma Nurmisto	F	L	19	2023	Tammela, Kanta-Häme, Finland
21	(Finland)	Juuli Salo	D	L	16	2026	Ivalo, Lapland, Finland
13	(Japan)	Kanami Seki	D	L	26	2026	Hokkaido, Japan
25	(Finland)	Fredrica Sundman (A)	F	R	21	2025	Porvoo, Uusimaa, Finland
52	(Finland)	Saphira Uusimäki	F	L	19	2025	Närpiö, Ostrobothnia, Finland
31	(Finland)	Natalie Williamson	G	L	23	2026	Brandon, Manitoba, Canada
12	(Norway)	Andrea Zeylon Grinnbo	D	L	21	2026	Fredrikstad, Østfold, Norway

Coaching staff and team personnel

- Head coach: Tony Suoniemi
- Goaltending coach: Jorma Valtonen
- Assistant coach: Jorma Valtonen
- Video coach: Rami Laiho
- Team manager: Hanna Karelius
- Assistant team manager: Eveliina Aakula
- Equipment managers: Benny Karlsson, Juho Lehtisalo & Hans Stenlund
- Physical therapist: Matias Nieminen

=== Team captaincy history ===
- Hanna Karelius, 2002–2004
- Noora Sirvö, 2014–15
- Jenni Jokinen, 2015–16
- Casandra Roine, 2016–2018
- Juulia Salonen, 2018–19
- Minni Lehtopelto, 2019–20
- Elina Heikkinen, 2020–2023
- Pihla Hämmeeniemi & Elina Heikkinen, 2023–24
- Eevi Ilvonen, 2024–2026
- Peppi Kähkönen, 2026–

=== Head coaches ===
- Jorma Valtonen, 2002–2004
- Mika Järvinen, 2004–05
- Timo Tuomi, 2014–2016
- Hanna Karelius, 2016–2018
- Matti Tähkäpää, 2019–11 February 2021
- Kai Ortio, 11 February 2021–March 2021
- Terhi Mertanen, 2021–2025
- Tony Suoniemi, 2025–

== Notable alumni ==
Years active with TPS listed alongside player name.

- Amel Gaily, 2009–2013
- Heidi Holmevaara (née Tallqvist), 2005–2010
- Marika Jestoi, 1991–1996
- Hanna Karelius, 1999–2006 & 2012–2014
- Maija Otamo, 2017–2022
- Olka Penttilä, 2010–2012
- Tiina Rinne, 2025–26
- Titta Ruohonen, 1999–2000, 2002–2008 & 2013–2015
- Mia Sakström, 1999–2005
- Pauliina Salonen, 2017–2022
- Noora Sirviö, 2007–08 & 2010–2015
- Susanna Tapani, 2018–19
- Nina Tikkinen, 2001–2005

International players

- (Italy) Maddalena Bedont, 2025–26
- (Austria) Carlotta Clodi, 2019–20
- (France) Estelle Duvin, 2020–2022
- (Czech Republic) Magdalena Erbenová, 2025–26
- (France) Lara Escudero, 2020–21
- (Slovakia) Lea Glosíková, August 2024–October 2025
- (France) Raphaëlle Grenier, 2022–23
- (Slovakia) Kinga Horváthová, 2020–21
- (Estonia) Monika Janis (née Enberg), 2007–2010 & 2011–12
- (Czech Republic) Tereza Pištěková, 2022–23
- (Italy) Carlotta Regine, 2019–20
- (United States) Katie Robinson, 2020–21
- (Czech Republic) (United States) Lenka Serdar, 2020–21
- (United Kingdom) Ellie Wallace, 2022–23
