= Eveliina Similä =

Finnish ice hockey player

- Born: 10 April 1978 (age 48) Toijala, Finland
- Height: 164 cm (5 ft 5 in)
- Weight: 70 kg (154 lb; 11 st 0 lb)
- Position: Forward
- Shot: Left
- Played for: Ilves Tampere; HPK Hämeenlinna
- National team: Finland
- Playing career: 1998–2012
Medal record
Women's ice hockey
Representing Finland
World Championships
Bronze medal – third place	2004 Canada

Eveliina Similä (born 10 April 1978) is a Finnish retired ice hockey player. She competed in 73 matches with the Finnish national team, including the women's tournament at the 2006 Winter Olympics and the IIHF World Championship in 2004 and 2005. Representing Finland, she won a World Championship bronze medal in 2004.

In Finland, she played with Ilves and HPK of the Naisten SM-sarja and won the Finnish Championship twice, with Ilves in 2006 and with HPK in 2011. In 2012, she won a bronze medal with HPK at the IIHF European Women's Champions Cup tournament.
