= Mira Huhta =

Finnish ice hockey player

- Born: 28 October 1987 (age 38) Helsinki, Finland
- Height: 165 cm (5 ft 5 in)
- Weight: 68 lb (31 kg; 4 st 12 lb)
- Position: Defense
- Shot: Left
- Played for: Espoo Blues; HPK Hämeenlinna; IHK Helsinki
- National team: Finland
- Playing career: 2005–2019
Medal record
World Championship
Bronze medal – third place	2011 Switzerland

Mira Huhta (born 28 October 1987) is a Finnish retired ice hockey player and former member of the Finnish national ice hockey team. She won a bronze medal while representing Finland at the 2011 IIHF Women's World Championship.

== Playing career ==
Huhta played 316 games in the Naisten Liiga (called Naisten SM-sarja until 2017) and concluded her career with a total of 195 points from 44 goals and 151 assists. She is a three-time Aurora Borealis Cup winner and was named to the Naisten Liiga All-Star team in 2017.

She participated in a national team training camp for the 2018 Winter Olympics, but was not selected to the final roster.
