= Raphaëlle Grenier =

French ice hockey player

- Born: 1 August 1996 (age 29) Orléans, France
- Height: 1.67 m (5 ft 6 in)
- Weight: 70 kg (154 lb; 11 st 0 lb)
- Position: Defence
- Shoots: Right
- NSML team Former teams: TPS Turku; Clermont-Lyon-Roanne; Lyon HC; Pôle France Féminin; Remparts de Tours
- National team: France
- Playing career: 2011–present

Raphaëlle Grenier (born 1 August 1996) is a French ice hockey player and member of the French national team, currently playing in the Finnish Naisten Liiga (NSML) with TPS Naiset.

She represented France at the 2019 IIHF Women's World Championship.
