= 2026–27 Auroraliiga season =

44th ice hockey season of the Auroraliiga

- League: Auroraliiga
- Sport: Ice hockey
- Defending champions: Kiekko-Espoo (2025–26)
- Duration: 12 September 2026 – 21 February 2027
- Games: 36 per team
- Teams: 8
- Total attendance: 7,072 (128.6 per game)
- TV partner(s): TV5; Kutonen
- Streaming partner(s): HBO Max; Leijonat.tv

Regular season
- Top scorer: (Finland) Kiira Yrjänen, K-Espoo

Seasons
- ← 2025–26 2027–28 →

The 2026–27 Auroraliiga season is the 44th ice hockey season of the Auroraliiga. The regular season began on 12 September 2026 and will conclude on 21 February 2027.

== League changes ==
=== Season format ===
Eight teams were granted licenses for the 2026–27 season. The regular season will be played as a five-cycle round-robin, plus a single-round robin of closing games, for a total of 36 matches per team.

The six teams with the highest point total at the end of the season will earn playoff berths. Teams finishing the season placed first and second will advance directly to the semifinals, while teams finishing third through sixth will participate in the quarterfinals. Quarterfinals will be played using the best-of-five format, while both semifinals and finals will be played using the best-of-seven format. The bronze medal match will remain single-elimination.

=== Checking ===
League rules were amended in March 2026 to permit some forms of body checking, starting in the 2026–27 season. The Auroraliiga proposed the rule change to the Finnish Ice Hockey Association in the hopes of speeding up the rate of play and to better correspond with the rules of other leagues, particularly the Swedish Women's Hockey League (SDHL) and the Professional Women's Hockey League (PWHL).

Under the new rules, legal hits include those made when players are moving in the same direction, when the puck is being fought for between players involved in the check near the boards, and in open ice when moving in the same direction, at a 90° angle, or when one player is stationary. Illegal hits include those made near the boards when the checker is entering the situation quickly from the outside or as a "third player" and open ice hits coming directly from the front or from a different direction.

=== KalPa ===
Following the 2025–26 Auroraliiga season, the operating club of KalPa Naiset, Juniori-KalPa ry, announced that it would not apply for an Auroraliiga license for the 2026–27 season and the team would instead compete in the Naisten Mestis.

== Teams ==
=== 2026–27 season ===
Location in Finland of teams participating in the 2026–27 season of Auroraliiga

Nine clubs were eligible to apply for Auroraliiga licenses for the 2026–27 season, of which eight teams applied for and were granted league licenses. Pelicans replaced RoKi after earning promotion in the 2026 postseason qualification, and KalPa voluntarily withdrew to the Naisten Mestis.

Team	Location	Home venue	Head coach	Captain
HIFK	Helsinki	Pirkkolan jäähalli	Saara Kivenmäki	Ilona Palin
HPK	Hämeenlinna	Pihlajalinna Areena	Marko Peltoniemi	Helen Strömberg
Ilves	Tampere	Tesoman jäähalli	Marjo Voutilainen	Johanna Siira
Kiekko-Espoo	Espoo	Tapiolan harjoitusareena	Minttu Tuominen	Emmi Rakkolainen
Kärpät	Oulu	Raksilan jäähalli	Mira Kuisma	Ada Ukkola
Pelicans	Lahti	Wemasto Areena	Petteri Hirvonen	Eevi Ilvonen
Team Kuortane	Alavus	Alavus Areena	Juuso Nieminen	Erika Kankkunen
TPS	Turku	Kupittaan jäähalli	Tony Suoniemi	Peppi Kähkönen

== Offseason ==
=== Coaching changes ===
Team	Previous coach	New coach
Kiekko-Espoo	Sami Haapanen	Minttu Tuominen
Kärpät	Teemu Koivula	Mira Kuisma

=== Player movements ===
Note: This section does not record all player signings. It is generally limited to player movements involving national team players from any country, international import players, and extra-league signings. Player nationality displayed is limited to primary nation of IIHF eligibility; some players may hold citizenship in more than one country.

Player	Nat	Previous team	2026–27 team	ref.
Incoming players
Keira Bolt (D)	(United States)	UW-Eau Claire Bluegolds (NCAA D3)	TPS Turku	
Clémence Boudin (F)	(France)	Pôle France Féminin	IFK Helsinki	
Ava Bullert (F)	(United States)	UW-Eau Claire Bluegolds (NCAA D3)	TPS Turku	
Iiris Falck (D)	(Finland)	Graz99ers Huskies (EWHL)	Pelicans Lahti	
Kateřina Fialová (G)	(Czech Republic)	HC Energie Karlovy Vary (1. liga)	Kärpät Oulu	
Julia Jackson (F)	(Canada)	TMU Bold (U Sports)	TPS Turku	
Gabija Jaroševičiūtė (F)	(Lithuania)	Sostine LRA (Baltic)	TPS Turku	
Kiku Kobayashi (G)	(Japan)	Seibu Princess Rabbits (WJIHL)	Pelicans Lahti	
Tanja Koljonen (F)	(Finland)	VSV Lady Hawks (EWHL)	Kiekko-Espoo	
My Lau (D)	(Denmark)	Rögle BK (NDHL)	HPK Hämeenlinna	
Ashley McCutcheon (F)	(Canada)	UPEI Panthers (U Sports)	TPS Turku	
Paige McGuire (F)	(Canada)	Färjestad BK (NDHL)	HPK Hämeenlinna	
Maéli Raigneau (F)	(France)	Pôle France Féminin	IFK Helsinki	
Emmi Rakkolainen (F)	(Finland)	HV71 (SDHL)	Kiekko-Espoo	
Kanami Seki (D)	(Japan)	Seibu Princess Rabbits (WJIHL)	TPS Turku	
Natalie Williamson (G)	(Canada)	Regina Cougars (U Sports)	TPS Turku	
Andrea Zeylon Grinnbo (D)	(Norway)	Lillehammer (Elitserien)	TPS Turku	
Intra-league transfers
Kerttu Kuja-Halkola (G)	(Finland)	Team Kuortane	IFK Helsinki	
Lunasa Sano (F)	(Japan)	KalPa Kuopio	IFK Helsinki	
Heta Seikkula (D)	(Finland)	HPK Hämeenlinna	Kiekko-Espoo	
Kiti Seikkula (F)	(Finland)	HPK Hämeenlinna	Kiekko-Espoo	
Departing players
Hilda Arhammar Pakarinen (F)	(Sweden)	IFK Helsinki	Harvard Crimson (NCAA D1)	
Nella Berg (D)	(Finland)	HPK Hämeenlinna	Luleå HF/MSSK (SDHL)	
Barbora Dalecká (G)	(Czech Republic)	RoKi Rovaniemi	Sacred Heart Pioneers (NCAA D1)	
Magdalena Erbenová (F)	(Czech Republic)	TPS Turku	Leksands IF (SDHL)	
Ada Eronen (D)	(Finland)	Kiekko-Espoo	SC Bern (PFWL)	
Manuela Heidenberger (D)	(Italy)	HPK Hämeenlinna	Holy Cross Crusaders (NCAA D1)	
Barbora Juříčková (F)	(Czech Republic)	HPK Hämeenlinna	St. Lawrence Saints (NCAA D1)	
Emmi Juusela (F)	(Finland)	IFK Helsinki	SDE HF (SDHL)	
Anna Kalová (F)	(Czech Republic)	HPK Hämeenlinna	Örebro HK (NDHL)	
Anni Keisala (G)	(Finland)	HPK Hämeenlinna	retired	
Athéna Locatelli (D)	(France)	IFK Helsinki	unknown	
Ines Lukkarila (F)	(Finland)	HPK Hämeenlinna	Örebro HK (NDHL)	
Dominika Malicka (F)	(Czech Republic)	KalPa Kuopio	Södertälje SK (NDHL)	
Tereza Mašková (D)	(Czech Republic)	HPK Hämeenlinna	Hammarby IF (NDHL)	
Emma Nuutinen (F)	(Finland)	Kiekko-Espoo	Seattle Torrent (PWHL)	
Pauliina Salonen (F)	(Finland)	IFK Helsinki	Minnesota Duluth Bulldogs (NCAA D1)	
Salla Sivula (G)	(Finland)	KalPa Kuopio	KeuPa/JYP (Naisten Mestis)	
Karolína Skořepová (F)	(Czech Republic)	Ilves Tampere	Wilkes Colonels (NCAA D3)	
Jutta Stoltenberg (F)	(Finland)	HPK Hämeenlinna	retired	
Tuuli Tallinen (D)	(Finland)	HPK Hämeenlinna	Minnesota Duluth Bulldogs (NCAA D1)	
Iben Tillman (D)	(Norway)	HPK Hämeenlinna	Eisbären Juniors Berlin (DFEL)	

== Preseason ==
The preseason began on 6 August 2026, with five Auroraliiga teams participating in the inaugural Naisten Pitsiturnaus (lit. 'Women's Laces Tournament'). Following the Naisten Pitsiturnaus, the preseason comprises exhibition games played between Auroraliiga teams or between an Auroraliiga team and a boys' junior team from the youth department of the same club or a local club.

=== Pitsiturnaus ===
The Pitsiturnaus (lit. 'Laces Tournament') has been held in Rauma since 1993 as a one-day preseason exhibition tournament for six men's ice hockey teams. In 2026, a women's tournament, the Naisten Pitsiturnaus, was played alongside the men's for the first time. The women's tournament was hosted by the Naisten Mestis team Lukko Rauma and five Auroraliiga teams participated: HIFK, HPK, Ilves, Kiekko-Espoo, and TPS.

Pitsiturnaus games are 40 minutes or two periods in length, allowing for a greater number of games to be played in one day. The women's tournament used the same tournament format as its counterpart, in which the six teams were split into two groups of three, called Group A and Group B, and each group played a single round-robin of three games. The teams finishing first and second in each group moved on to the semifinals, while the third-ranked teams played a single game for fifth place. The semifinals comprised single-elimination games between the top ranked team from each group and the second ranked team from the other group. The winners of the semifinal games moved on to the final.

Group A

Pos	Team	Pld	W	D	L	GF	GA	GD	Pts
1	Ilves Tampere	2	2	0	0	8	2	+6	4
2	TPS Turku	2	1	0	1	2	4	−2	2
3	Lukko Rauma (H)	2	0	0	2	1	5	−4	0

Source: Suomen Jääkiekkoliitto
(H) Hosts

Group B

Pos	Team	Pld	W	D	L	GF	GA	GD	Pts
1	Kiekko-Espoo	2	2	0	0	5	1	+4	4
2	IFK Helsinki	2	0	1	1	1	2	−1	1
3	HPK Hämeenlinna	2	0	1	1	0	3	−3	1

Source: Suomen Jääkiekkoliitto

Bracket

Semifinals
A1	Ilves Tampere	0
B2	IFK Helsinki	3
B1	Kiekko-Espoo	2
A2	TPS Turku	0

Finals
IFK Helsinki	1
Kiekko-Espoo	2

Source: Suomen Jääkiekkoliitto

=== Other preseason ===
==== Schedule ====
Exhibition games
Date	Home	Score	Visitor	OT	Attn	Notes	Recap
6 August	Kärpät	5–6	Kärpät U15 Musta		45		
8 August	K-Espoo	3–0	Pelicans		82	Shutout recorded by Lilia Huovinen	
14 August	HPK	0–3	Luleå HF			Match played at Kokkolan harjoitusjäähalli 2 ('Kokkola's training ice rink 2') in Kokkola, Finland	
15 August	K-Espoo	3–2	HIFK	OT	62		
15 August	Kuortane	4–1	Ilves		30		
15 August	Kärpät	0–4	Luleå HF				
16 August	HPK	0–3	Luleå HF			Match played at Kokkolan harjoitusjäähalli 2	
16 August	K-Espoo	2–3	HIFK		70		
19 August	TPS	3–1	Lukko		90		
20 August	K-Espoo	7–6	K-Espoo U15 Jeret	OT	10	Hat-trick by Tanja Koljonen; Played at Matinkylän jäähalli in Espoo's Matinkylä district	
21 August	HIFK	5–0	Pelicans		46	Shutout recorded by Lilli Packalen	
22 August	K-Espoo	5–0	Ilves		40	Shutout recorded by Tiia Pajarinen	
22 August	Pelicans	2–1	HIFK		90		
23 August	HPK	2–5	K-Espoo		90		
23 August	Ilves	4–1	K-Espoo Ak		50		
26 August	Ilves	5–1	Kuortane		80	Hat-trick by Anna-Kaisa Antti-Roiko (four goals total)	
27 August	K-Espoo	5–8	K-Espoo U15 Hiret		30	Hat-trick by Luka Kaura; Played at Matinkylän jäähalli	
27 August	Kärpät	2–7	Kärpät U15 Valkoinen		35	Hat-trick by Veeti Miettinen (five goals total)	
27 August	Kuortane	3–8	S-Kiekko U15 Musta		50		
29 August	Pelicans	3–4	Ilves		80		
29 August	TPS		K-Espoo		30		
30 August	K-Espoo	5–2	TPS		50		
2 September	HIFK	1–3	HIFK U16 II		99		
9 September	Kärpät	1–9	Kärpät U15 Musta		53		

== Regular season ==
The regular season began on Saturday, 12 September 2026.

=== Standings ===
Pos	Team	Pld	W	OTW	OTL	L	GF	GA	GD	Pts	Postseason
1	Kiekko-Espoo	16	15	0	1	0	84	19	+65	46	Playoffs
2	IFK Helsinki	15	10	3	0	2	47	25	+22	36	Playoffs
3	HPK	15	9	0	1	5	64	37	+27	28	Playoffs
4	Team Kuortane	15	7	1	1	6	44	34	+10	24	Playoffs
5	TPS	16	6	0	2	8	38	58	−20	20	Playoffs
6	Tampereen Ilves	13	5	1	1	6	38	44	−6	18	Playoffs
7	Lahden Pelicans	16	2	1	0	13	28	86	−58	8	
8	Oulun Kärpät	14	0	0	0	14	17	57	−40	0	

Updated to match(es) played on 1 November 2026. Source: Leijonat

=== Results ===
2026–27 regular season

September
Date	Home	Score	Visitor	OT	Attn	Notes	Recap
12 September	Pelicans	3–2	TPS		380		
12 September	K-Espoo	3–1	HPK		163		
12 September	Ilves	3–4	Kuortane		115		
12 September	Kärpät	1–3	HIFK		390		
13 September	Kuortane	7–0	Pelicans		90	Shutout recorded by Iina Kankaanpää (1)	
13 September	TPS	1–8	K-Espoo		97		
13 September	HPK	6–1	Ilves		100		
13 September	Kärpät	3–4	HIFK		175		
18 September	Pelicans	2–9	HPK		140	Six points (1+5) by Paige McGuire	
19 September	K-Espoo	4–0	Kärpät		75	Shutout recorded by Lilia Huovinen (1)	
19 September	TPS	2–1	Kuortane		50		
19 September	Ilves	1–2	HIFK	SO	80		
20 September	Pelicans	1–6	K-Espoo		120		
20 September	HIFK	3–1	Kärpät		105		
20 September	Ilves	4–3	Kuortane	OT	70		
20 September	HPK	6–7	TPS		110	Hat-trick by Emmi Loponen (1)	
26 September	HIFK	3–2	K-Espoo	SO	79		
26 September	Ilves	5–2	Pelicans		75		
26 September	Kärpät	1–3	HPK		170		
26 September	Kuortane	4–1	TPS		40		
27 September	Pelicans	1–5	HIFK		150		
27 September	K-Espoo	3–1	Ilves		82		
27 September	Kuortane	3–1	HPK		70		
27 September	Kärpät	0–2	TPS		135	Shutout recorded by Natalie Williamson (1)	
	24 games played 139 goals scored			1 OT 2 SO	3061	1 hat-trick 3 shutouts	

October
Date	Home	Score	Visitor	OT	Attn	Notes	Recap
3 October	HIFK	3–1	Kuortane		54		
3 October	K-Espoo	6–0	TPS		73	Shutout recorded by Tiia Pajarinen (1)	
3 October	HPK	6–1	Pelicans		80		
4 October	HPK	2–0	Kuortane		70	Shutout recorded by Miia Vainio (1)	
4 October	K-Espoo	6–2	HIFK		123		
4 October	TPS	2–3	Pelicans	SO	147		
10 October	Pelicans	5–2	Kärpät		140		
10 October	K-Espoo	5–2	HPK		113		
10 October	Ilves	6–4	TPS		75		
11 October	Ilves	3–5	K-Espoo		60	Hat-trick by Kiira Yrjänen (1)	
11 October	Pelicans	2–5	Kuortane		150		
11 October	HPK	5–1	Kärpät		70		
11 October	TPS	1–2	HIFK		99		
17 October	HPK	1–6	K-Espoo		90	Hat-trick by Kiira Yrjänen (2)	
17 October	TPS	4–2	Kärpät		40		
17 October	Kuortane	1–4	Ilves		120		
17 October	Pelicans	1–5	HIFK		180		
18 October	HPK	2–3	HIFK	OT	82		
18 October	Ilves	3–1	Kärpät		70		
18 October	Kuortane	2–1	TPS	SO	60		
18 October	K-Espoo	8–0	Pelicans		142	Shutout recorded by Tiia Pajarinen (2)	
23 October	HIFK	4–2	Ilves		98		
24 October	TPS	4–0	Kärpät		71	Shutout recorded by Zoe McGee (1)	
24 October	K-Espoo	9–1	Pelicans		68	Hat-trick by Emmi Rakkoalinen (1)	
24 October	Kuortane	0–1	HIFK		50	Shutout recorded by Kerttu Kuja-Halkola (1)	
25 October	Pelicans	1–6	HPK		90		
25 October	Kuortane	8–4	Kärpät		85		
25 October	K-Espoo	5–0	TPS		89	Shutout recorded by Minja Drufva (1)	
29 October	Pelicans	3–4	Ilves		70		
29 October	HPK	8–2	TPS		1171	Best attended game of the season	
31 October	HIFK	5–0	Kärpät		91	Shutout recorded by Nelli Nieminen (1)	
31 October	K-Espoo	4–2	Kuortane		90	Hat-trick by Tinja-Mariia Haukijärvi (1)	
	32 games played 256 goals scored			1 OT 2 SO	4011	4 hat-tricks 7 shutouts	

November
Date	Home	Score	Visitor	OT	Attn	Notes	Recap
1 November	K-Espoo	4–1	Kärpät		96		
1 November	HIFK	2–3	Kuortane		84		
1 November	Ilves	1–6	HPK		60		
1 November	TPS	5–2	Pelicans		79		
14 November	Kuortane		Kärpät				
15 November	Kuortane		Kärpät				
20 November	Ilves		Pelicans				
20 November	Kärpät		Kuortane				
21 November	HIFK		HPK				
21 November	TPS		Ilves				
21 November	Kuortane		K-Espoo				
22 November	HPK		Pelicans				
22 November	TPS		HIFK				
22 November	Kärpät		K-Espoo				
28 November	HIFK		Pelicans				
28 November	K-Espoo		Ilves				
28 November	TPS		Kuortane				
28 November	HPK		Kärpät				
29 November	Pelicans		Kärpät				
29 November	HPK		Kuortane				
29 November	TPS		Ilves				
29 November	HIFK		K-Espoo				
	4 games played 24 goals scored			0 OT 0 SO	319	0 hat-tricks 0 shutouts	

December
Date	Home	Score	Visitor	OT	Attn	Notes	Recap
4 December	HIFK		TPS				
5 December	Kärpät		K-Espoo				
5 December	Kuortane		Pelicans				
5 December	TPS		HPK				
5 December	HIFK		Ilves				
6 December	Ilves		HPK				
6 December	Kuortane		K-Espoo				
6 December	Kärpät		Pelicans				
9 December	Kärpät		Kuortane				
12 December	Pelicans		K-Espoo				
12 December	Ilves		HPK				
12 December	Kuortane		HIFK				
13 December	TPS		HPK				
13 December	Kuortane		Pelicans				
13 December	Kärpät		HIFK				
18 December	HPK		HIFK				
19 December	TPS		Kärpät				
19 December	Pelicans		Ilves				
19 December	HIFK		Kuortane				
19 December	K-Espoo		HPK				
20 December	Pelicans		TPS				
20 December	Ilves		Kärpät				
20 December	K-Espoo		Kuortane				
	0 games played 0 goals scored			0 OT 0 SO	0	0 hat-tricks 0 shutouts	

January
Date	Home	Score	Visitor	OT	Attn	Notes	Recap
8 January	Ilves		TPS				
9 January	Ilves		HIFK				
9 January	Pelicans		HPK				
9 January	Kärpät		K-Espoo				
10 January	Kuortane		K-Espoo				
10 January	HIFK		HPK				
16 January	Kuortane		TPS				
16 January	HPK		Ilves				
16 January	Kärpät		Pelicans				
16 January	K-Espoo		HIFK				
17 January	HIFK		HPK				
17 January	Kärpät		TPS				
17 January	K-Espoo		Ilves				
22 January	HPK		K-Espoo				
22 January	TPS		Ilves				
23 January	Pelicans		HIFK				
24 January	HIFK		TPS				
24 January	HPK		Pelicans				
24 January	Ilves		K-Espoo				
29 January	TPS		K-Espoo				
29 January	HIFK		Pelicans				
30 January	Kuortane		Ilves				
31 January	HPK		Kuortane				
31 January	Pelicans		TPS				
31 January	Kärpät		Ilves				
	0 games played 0 goals scored			0 OT 0 SO	0	0 hat-tricks 0 shutouts	

February
Date	Home	Score	Visitor	OT	Attn	Notes	Recap
5 February	Ilves		TPS				
5 February	K-Espoo		Pelicans				
5 February	Kärpät		Kuortane				
6 February	HIFK		K-Espoo				
6 February	Kuortane		HPK				
6 February	Ilves		Pelicans				
7 February	TPS		HIFK				
7 February	Kärpät		HPK				
13 February	Kärpät		Ilves				
14 February	Kärpät		Ilves				
20 February	HIFK		Ilves				
20 February	TPS		K-Espoo				
20 February	Pelicans		Kuortane				
20 February	HPK		Kärpät				
21 February	Pelicans		Kärpät				
21 February	HPK		TPS				
21 February	Ilves		Kuortane				
21 February	K-Espoo		HIFK				
	0 games played 0 goals scored			0 OT 0 SO	0	0 hat-tricks 0 shutouts	

=== Player statistics ===
==== Scoring leaders ====
The following table lists the league leaders in point scoring at the conclusion of games played 1 November 2026.

Abbreviations: GP = Games played; G = Goals; Assists = Assists; Pts = Points; PIM = Penalty minutes (→ see ice hockey statistics and glossary of ice hockey terms)

Player	Team	GP	G	A	Pts	PIM
Kiira Yrjänen	K-Espoo	15	16	11	27	0
Paige McGuire	HPK	15	9	16	25	2
Kiti Seikkula	K-Espoo	16	6	17	23	0
Yenna Kolmonen	Kuortane	13	12	9	21	0
Tinja-Mariia Haukijärvi	K-Espoo	15	12	8	20	16
Emma Ekoluoma	Ilves	11	13	5	18	0
Emmi Loponen	HPK	13	7	11	18	6
Emilia Varpula	Ilves	13	3	15	18	4
Anni Montonen	K-Espoo	16	5	12	17	2
Abigail Byskata	Kuortane	15	10	6	16	2
Eva Lamberg	HPK	14	9	7	16	31
Aino Lehikoinen	HIFK	13	8	8	16	2
Karoliina Rantamäki	K-Espoo	16	8	8	16	0
Henni Virtanen	HPK	15	9	6	15	20
Senja Siivonen	Kuortane	15	6	8	14	30
Julia Kuhta	HIFK	15	6	8	14	0
Lisette Täks	K-Espoo	15	4	10	14	4
Heta Seikkula	K-Espoo	16	2	12	14	4
Emmi Rakkolainen	K-Espoo	16	6	7	13	12
Erika Kankkunen	Kuortane	15	4	9	13	12

The following skaters were the top point scorers of teams not represented on the scoring leader table at the conclusion of games played on 1 Novemberber 2026, noted with their overall league scoring rank:

24. Fredrica Sundman, TPS: 16 GP, 4 G, 7 A, 11 Pts, 20 PIM
T28. Saimi Lehto, Pelicans: 13 GP, 3 G, 7 A, 10 Pts, 6 PIM
36. Sari Wäänänen, Kärpät: 14 GP, 4 G, 4 A, 8 Pts, 18 PIM

==== Goaltenders ====
The following table lists all goaltenders who had played at least one-third of their team's minutes in net at the conclusion of games played on 18 October 2026, sorted by save percentage.

Abbreviations: GPI = Games played in; TOI = Time on ice (minutes:seconds); W = Wins; L = Losses; SA = Shots against (Saves+Goals against); GA = Goals against; SO = Shutouts; S% = Save percentage; GAA = Goals against average (→ see ice hockey statistics and glossary of ice hockey terms)

Player	Team	GPI	TOI	W	L	SA	GA	SO	S%	GAA
Lilli Packalen	HIFK	6	320:00	5	0	114	6	0	94.7	1.12
Iina Kankaanpää	Kuortane	5	301:44	2	2	115	7	1	93.9	1.39
Lilia Huovinen	K-Espoo	5	276:26	5	0	93	6	1	93.5	1.30
Miia Vainio	HPK	7	323:21	4	1	132	9	1	93.2	1.67
Emilia Piekkari	Kärpät	6	352:27	0	6	234	18	0	92.3	3.06
Kerttu Kuja-Halkola	HIFK	6	353:39	3	1	172	14	0	91.9	2.38
Annika Saastamoinen	Kuortane	6	360:13	3	3	175	15	0	91.4	2.50
Tiia Pajarinen	K-Espoo	6	328:34	4	0	65	6	2	90.8	1.10
Neea Pohjamo	Ilves	7	419:07	3	3	205	21	0	89.8	3.01
Pihla Ikonen	HPK	7	394:00	2	5	198	23	0	88.4	3.50
Natalie Williamson	TPS	10	544:04	4	4	271	32	1	88.2	3.53
Kiku Kobayashi	Pelicans	5	291:38	1	3	183	25	0	86.3	5.14
Mira Eskola	Pelicans	5	305:00	1	3	154	24	0	84.4	4.72

=== In-season player movements ===
Note: This section records all in-season player transactions. Player nationality indicates primary nation of IIHF eligibility; some players may hold multiple citizenship.

Player	Nat	Previous team	Joining team	Movement date	ref.
Incoming players
Tiina Ranne (G)	(Finland)	KuKi Team (III-divisioona)	Ilves Tampere	11 October 2026	
Zoe McGee (G)	(Canada)	Ontario Tech Ridgebacks (U Sports; 2025–26)	TPS Turku	13 October 2026	
Madison Tiro (D)	(Canada)	Toronto Varsity Blues (U Sports; 2025–26)	TPS Turku	16 October 2026	
Katie Sweeney (G)	(Canada)	St. Thomas Tommies (U Sports; 2025–26)	HPK Hämeelinna	23 October 2026	
