= 2025–26 Auroraliiga season =

43rd ice hockey season of the Auroraliiga

- League: Auroraliiga
- Sport: Ice hockey
- Duration: 6 September 2025 – 22 February 2026; Playoffs; 28 February – 8 April 2026; Qualification; 14 March – 21 March 2026
- Games: 144 (32 per team)
- Teams: 9
- Total attendance: 13,717 (95.3 per game)
- TV partner(s): TV5; Kutonen
- Streaming partner(s): HBO Max; Leijonat.tv

Regular season
- Season champions: Kiekko-Espoo
- Runners-up: HPK Hämeenlinna
- Season MVP: (Finland) Emma Nuutinen, K-Espoo
- Top scorer: (Finland) Emma Nuutinen, K-Espoo
- Promoted to Auroraliiga: Pelicans Lahti
- Relegated to N. Mestis: RoKi Rovaniemi

Aurora Borealis Cup playoffs
- Finals champions: Kiekko-Espoo
- Runners-up: HPK Hämeenlinna

Seasons
- ← 2024–25 2026–27 →

The 2025–26 Auroraliiga season is the 43rd ice hockey season of the Auroraliiga. It is the second season since the league re-branded as Auroraliiga from Naisten Liiga, the name that had been in use since 2017. The regular season began on 6 September 2025 and concluded on 22 February 2026.

Kiekko-Espoo were the regular season champions for the third consecutive season. The team claimed the title by amassing an unbeatable points advantage on 25 January 2026, several weeks before the conclusion of the regular season.

The 2026 Aurora Borealis Cup playoffs began on 28 February and the Aurora Borealis Cup was awarded to Kiekko-Espoo on 8 April.

== Offseason ==
=== Coaching changes ===
Team	Previous coach	New coach	Details
HPK	Jari Risku	Marko Peltoniemi	Risku had taken the reins of HPK in the 2022–23 season, following eight seasons serving on the coaching staff of Team Kuortane. He also brought experience as a coach of the women's national teams of Finland, Hungary, and Austria, as well as the Finnish women's national under-18 team. Despite HPK's successful 2024–25 season, which culminated in a Finnish Championship silver medal, Risku selected not to continue as the team's head coach. On 3 April 2025 the club announced on its website that Marko Peltoniemi would take on the head coaching duties of the Auroraliiga team. Peltoniemi had served as head coach of HPK Akatemia in the Naisten Mestis since 2021 and had coached multiple of the club's women's junior teams since 2018.
TPS	Terhi Mertanen	Tony Suoniemi	On 15 January 2025, TPS announced via its official website that Terhi Mertanen would not continue as head coach of Turku for the 2025–26 season, bringing her four-season tenure at the helm of TPS to an end. On 29 March 2025, the club announced Tony Suoniemi as the new head coach of TPS. Suoniemi had served as head coach of Ilves Akatemia in the Naisten Suomi-sarja during the 2023–24 season and as the skills coach of Ilves in the Auroraliiga during the 2024–25 season.

=== Player movements ===
Note: This section does not record all player signings. It is generally limited to player movements involving national team players from any country, international import players, and extra-league signings. Player nationality displayed is limited to primary nation of IIHF eligibility; some players may hold citizenship in more than one country.

Player	Nat	Previous team	2025–26 team	ref.
Incoming players
Hilda Arhammar Pakarinen (F)	(Sweden)	SDE HF (SDHL)	IFK Helsinki	
Maddalena Bedont (D)	(Italy)	EVB Eagles (EWHL/IHLW)	TPS Turku	
Marie Chrastinová (D)	(Czech Republic)	HC Roudnice nad Labem (Extraliga žen)	KalPa Kuopio	
Tereza Mašková (D)	(Czech Republic)	OHA Mavericks (OWHL U22)	HPK Hämeenlinna	
Kiira Yrjänen (F)	(Finland)	Leksands IF (SDHL)	Kiekko-Espoo	
Intra-league transfers
Anna-Kaisa Antti-Roiko (F)	(Finland)	Kärpät Oulu	Ilves Tampere	
Johanna Juutilainen (F)	(Finland)	KalPa Kuopio	Ilves Tampere	
Anna Kalová (F)	(Czech Republic)	RoKi Rovaniemi	HPK Hämeenlinna	
Dominika Malicka (F)	(Czech Republic)	RoKi Rovaniemi	KalPa Kuopio	
Karolína Skořepová (F)	(Czech Republic)	Kärpät Oulu	Ilves Tampere	
Departing players
Maria Heinonen (F)	(Finland)	RoKi Rovaniemi	EHC Zunzgen-Sissach (SWHL B	
Tanja Koljonen (F)	(Finland)	KalPa Kuopio	Villach Lady Hawks (EWHL)	
Aino Laitinen (G)	(Finland)	KalPa Kuopio	Villach Lady Hawks (EWHL)	
Kerttu Lehmus (F)	(Finland)	Team Kuortane	Merrimack Warriors (NCAA D1)	
Júlia Matejková (F)	(Slovakia)	HPK Hämeenlinna	ECDC Memmingen (DFEL)	
Elli Mäkelä (D)	(Finland)	KalPa Kuopio	HK Budapest (DFEL)	
Peppi Virtanen (F)	(Finland)	HPK Hämeenlinna	Saskatchewan Huskies (U Sports)	

== Teams ==
Location of teams in the Auroraliiga

Team	Location	Home venue	Head coach	Captain
HIFK	Helsinki	Pirkkolan jäähalli	Saara Kivenmäki	Athéna Locatelli
HPK	Hämeenlinna	Jääliikuntakeskus Hakio	Marko Peltoniemi	Heta Seikkula
Ilves	Tampere	Tesoman jäähalli	Marjo Voutilainen	Jenna Lehtiniemi
KalPa	Kuopio	Niiralan Monttu	Artturi Rouhiainen	Lunasa Sano
Kiekko-Espoo	Espoo	Tapiolan harjoitusareena	Sami Haapanen	Reetta Valkjärvi
Kärpät	Oulu	Raksilan harjoitushalli	Teemu Koivula	Aino Kaijankoski
RoKi	Rovaniemi	Lappi Areena	Oona Parviainen	Moona Keskisarja
Team Kuortane	Kuortane	Kuortaneen jäähalli	Juuso Nieminen	Sofia Kari
TPS	Turku	Kupittaan jäähalli	Tony Suoniemi	Eevi Ilvonen

== Regular season ==
The regular season began on Saturday, 6 September 2025. The season opening weekend was hosted in Oulu at the Raksilan harjoitushalli.

=== Standings ===
The regular season concluded on Sunday, 22 February 2026. Kiekko-Espoo finished the season at least ten points ahead of any other team in the league and won the regular season title for the third consecutive year.

Pos	Team	Pld	W	OTW	OTL	L	GF	GA	GD	Pts	Postseason
1	Kiekko-Espoo	32	27	2	1	2	169	52	+117	86	Playoffs
2	HPK	32	23	3	1	5	145	45	+100	76	Playoffs
3	IFK Helsinki	32	22	0	3	7	137	68	+69	69	Playoffs
4	Team Kuortane	32	18	2	2	10	93	72	+21	60	Playoffs
5	Tampereen Ilves	32	16	2	2	12	154	88	+66	54	Playoffs
6	TPS	32	10	3	1	18	101	93	+8	37	Playoffs
7	Oulun Kärpät	32	7	2	1	22	88	134	−46	26	Playoffs
8	KalPa	32	4	2	6	20	50	114	−64	22	Playoffs
9	RoKi	32	0	1	0	31	35	306	−271	2	Qualification

Source: Leijonat

=== Results ===
2025–26 regular season

September
Date	Home	Score	Visitor	OT	Attn	Notes	Recap
6 September	HIFK	3–7	Ilves		105		
6 September	Kärpät	2–0	HPK		318	Shutout recorded by Ronja Pätsi (1)	
6 September	TPS	12–1	RoKi		165		
6 September	KalPa	0–7	K-Espoo		117	Shutout recorded by Minja Drufva (1)	
7 September	Ilves	4–5	TPS		110		
7 September	Kuortane	2–4	HIFK		90		
7 September	HPK	6–2	KalPa		120		
7 September	Kärpät	3–5	K-Espoo		250		
12 September	HPK	1–0	HIFK		70	Shutout recorded by Anni Keisala (1)	
12 September	Ilves	2–4	K-Espoo		90		
13 September	Kärpät	1–2	KalPa	GWS	116		
13 September	Ilves	0–2	HPK		85	Shutout recorded by Anni Keisala (2)	
13 September	Kuortane	3–1	TPS		30		
14 September	RoKi	1–11	Kärpät		105	Hat-trick by Aino Kaijankoski (1), four goals total Hat-trick by Inna Korpi-Halkola (1), four goals total	
14 September	KalPa	0–3	Kuortane		106	Shutout recorded by Kerttu Kuja-Halkola (1)	
14 September	TPS	2–5	HIFK		79		
20 September	HIFK	4–1	Kärpät		100		
20 September	RoKi	0–16	HPK		45	Hat-trick by Eva Lamberg (1); Shutout recorded by Pihla Ikonen (1)	
20 September	K-Espoo	5–2	Kuortane		117	Hat-trick by Emma Nuutinen (1), four goals total	
20 September	KalPa	2–11	Ilves		74	Hat-trick by Emma Ekoluoma (1), six points total	
21 September	RoKi	0–11	HPK		42	Hat-trick by Barbora Juříčková (1), seven points total Shutout recorded by Liisa Lindholm (1)	
21 September	K-Espoo	7–0	Kärpät		130	Hat-trick by Emma Nuutinen (2); Shutout recorded by Minja Drufva (2)	
21 September	KalPa	2–3	HIFK		85		
21 September	TPS	2–3	Kuortane		75		
27 September	HIFK	3–4	K-Espoo	GWS	102		
27 September	Kärpät	3–7	Ilves		101		
27 September	RoKi	0–9	TPS		44	Shutout recorded by Miia Vainio (1)	
28 September	Kärpät	5–2	TPS		108		
28 September	KalPa	0–2	Kuortane		75	Shutout recorded by Lilia Huovinen (1)	
28 September	K-Espoo	3–2	HPK		151		
28 September	RoKi	2–19	Ilves		105	Hat-trick by Anna-Kaisa Antti-Roiko (1); Hat-trick by Emma Ekoluoma (2), six points total	
	31 games played 231 goals scored			0 OT 2 GWS	3310	9 hat-tricks 10 shutouts	

October
Date	Home	Score	Visitor	OT	Attn	Notes	Recap
2 October	K-Espoo	4–2	HIFK		127		
3 October	TPS	2–5	HPK		71		
4 October	HPK	4–1	TPS		110		
4 October	HIFK	8–2	RoKi		55	Hat-trick by Anni Pere (1); Hat-trick by Ella Turunen (1)	
4 October	Ilves	5–0	Kärpät		85	Shutout recorded by Neea Pohjamo (1)	
4 October	Kuortane	2–0	KalPa		50	Shutout recorded by Kerttu Kuja-Halkola (2)	
5 October	K-Espoo	11–0	RoKi		88	Shutout recorded by Minja Drufva (3)	
5 October	Ilves	4–3	KalPa		85		
5 October	Kuortane	2–0	Kärpät		50	Shutout recorded by Lilia Huovinen (2)	
8 October	TPS	4–2	Ilves		50		
11 October	TPS	3–1	Kärpät		40		
11 October	HPK	6–1	Kuortane		90		
11 October	KalPa	1–6	HIFK		68		
11 October	RoKi	0–12	K-Espoo		53	Hat-trick by Aliisa Toivonen (1), four goals total Shutout recorded by Tiia Pajarinen (1)	
12 October	RoKi	2–11	K-Espoo		51		
12 October	KalPa	4–6	Ilves		58	Hat-trick by Dominika Malicka (1)	
12 October	HPK	12–3	Kärpät		70		
17 October	HPK	0–6	K-Espoo		367	Shutout recorded by Tiia Pajarinen (2)	
18 October	Kuortane	1–5	K-Espoo		50	Hat-trick by Anni Montonen (1)	
18 October	TPS	0–4	Ilves		151	Shutout recorded by Neea Pohjamo (2)	
18 October	HPK	4–1	KalPa		170		
18 October	RoKi	1–12	HIFK		55		
19 October	Ilves	4–1	KalPa		85		
19 October	Kärpät	2–3	HIFK		209		
19 October	RoKi	0–5	Kuortane		57	Shutout recorded by Lilia Huovinen (3)	
24 October	TPS	2–1	HPK	OT	67		
25 October	K-Espoo	3–0	Kuortane		105	Shutout recorded by Tiia Pajarinen (3)	
25 October	HPK	4–1	Ilves		70		
25 October	HIFK	9–3	Kärpät		72	Hat-trick by Pauliina Salonen (1)	
25 October	KalPa	3–4	RoKi	GWS	74		
26 October	K-Espoo	7–3	Kärpät		108	Hat-trick by Emma Nuutinen (3)	
26 October	KalPa	4–0	RoKi		63	Shutout recorded by Salla Sivula (1)	
26 October	Kuortane	6–5	Ilves	OT	80		
	33 games played 233 goals scored			2 OT 1 GWS	2984	7 hat-tricks 10 shutouts	

November
Date	Home	Score	Visitor	OT	Attn	Notes	Recap
1 November	K-Espoo	4–3	Ilves		103		
1 November	KalPa	2–3	Kärpät	GWS	57		
1 November	TPS	11–1	RoKi		53		
1 November	Kuortane	2–3	HPK	OT	60		
2 November	K-Espoo	4–1	TPS		120		
2 November	HPK	8–0	RoKi		80	Shutout recorded by Liisa Lindholm (1)	
2 November	HIFK	3–2	Kuortane		94		
2 November	Kärpät	3–2	KalPa	GWS	171		
14 November	HPK	5–0	TPS		60	Shutout recorded by Anni Keisala (3)	
14 November	HIFK	3–0	K-Espoo		69	Shutout recorded by Lilli Packalen (1)	
15 November	Ilves	10–2	RoKi		65		
15 November	Kuortane	4–1	Kärpät		60		
15 November	TPS	2–1	KalPa	GWS	70		
16 November	Ilves	8–0	Kärpät		80	Shutout recorded by Melisa Mörönen (1)	
16 November	Kuortane	5–1	RoKi		50		
16 November	HIFK	4–0	KalPa		115		
21 November	TPS	1–3	K-Espoo		61		
21 November	Ilves	3–1	HIFK		70		
22 November	Kuortane	2–0	TPS		60	Shutout recorded by Kerttu Kuja-Halkola (3)	
22 November	HIFK	12–1	RoKi		61	Hat-trick by Iida Lappalainen (1); Hat-trick by Anni Pere (2); Hat-trick by Pauliina Salonen (2)	
22 November	Kärpät	0–6	HPK		109	Shutout recorded by Anni Keisala (4)	
23 November	K-Espoo	18–2	RoKi		78	Hat-trick by Elsa Talvitie (1), six points total; Hat-trick by Nea Koskipalo (1), four goals total; Hat-trick by Roosa Vuosalmi (1)	
23 November	Kärpät	0–2	Kuortane		125	Shutout recorded by Lilia Huovinen (4)	
23 November	KalPa	0–3	HPK		114	Shutout recorded by Pihla Ikonen (2)	
28 November	HPK	2–1	HIFK	GWS	70		
29 November	RoKi	0–12	TPS		39	Shutout recorded by Miia Vainio (2)	
29 November	K-Espoo	4–1	KalPa		62		
29 November	Kärpät	2–5	Ilves		143		
30 November	RoKi	3–11	Ilves		42	Hat-trick by Emma Ekoluoma (3), six points total	
30 November	HPK	4–0	Kuortane		60	Hat-trick by Eva Lamberg (2); Shutout recorded by Anni Keisala (5)	
30 November	HIFK	2–1	KalPa		69		
30 November	Kärpät	3–4	TPS		115		
	32 games played 207 goals scored			1 OT 4 GWS	2585	8 hat-tricks 10 shutouts	

December
Date	Home	Score	Visitor	OT	Attn	Notes	Recap
3 December	TPS	2–5	K-Espoo		53		
6 December	Kuortane	4–2	HIFK		60		
7 December	KalPa	1–2	HPK	OT	63		
7 December	TPS	3–5	HIFK		79		
7 December	Kuortane	4–5	Ilves	OT	60		
7 December	Kärpät	9–3	RoKi		175	Hat-trick by Ella-Sofia Hautala (1); Hat-trick by Emmi Puusaari (1)	
17 December	HIFK	3–0	HPK		59	Shutout recorded by Lilli Packalen (2)	
19 December	HPK	2–4	K-Espoo		90		
19 December	Ilves	4–0	Kuortane		65	Shutout recorded by Neea Pohjamo (3)	
20 December	RoKi	1–10	Kärpät		38	Hat-trick by Emmi Loponen (1), six points total	
20 December	Ilves	1–2	TPS		95		
20 December	Kuortane	6–1	KalPa		70		
20 December	K-Espoo	4–3	HIFK		115		
	13 games played 86 goals scored			2 OT 0 GWS	1022	3 hat-tricks 2 shutouts	

January
Date	Home	Score	Visitor	OT	Attn	Notes	Recap
8 January	K-Espoo	1–3	HPK		102		
10 January	Ilves	1–2	HIFK		558		
10 January	K-Espoo	4–2	TPS		115	Hat-trick by Emma Nuutinen (4)	
10 January	KalPa	2–1	Kärpät		68		
11 January	HPK	4–0	Ilves		80	Shutout recorded by Anni Keisala (6)	
17 January	Ilves	2–4	HPK		110		
17 January	RoKi	0–2	KalPa		105	Shutout recorded by Salla Sivula (2)	
18 January	RoKi	0–4	KalPa		105	Shutout recorded by Salla Sivula (3)	
23 January	HIFK	4–5	Ilves	OT	93		
24 January	Kuortane	1–6	HPK		40		
24 January	Ilves	9–0	RoKi		70	Hat-trick by Linnea Melotindos (1), four goals total Shutout recorded by Neea Pohjamo (4)	
24 January	Kärpät	2–3	K-Espoo		101		
25 January	KalPa	0–6	K-Espoo		45	Shutout recorded by Minja Drufva (4)	
25 January	HPK	9–3	RoKi		80		
25 January	HIFK	3–0	TPS		111	Shutout recorded by Janika Järvikari (1)	
25 January	Kärpät	2–3	Kuortane		151		
30 January	HIFK	4–2	TPS		56		
31 January	Kuortane	5–0	RoKi		50	Shutout recorded by Lilia Huovinen (5)	
31 January	TPS	4–3	KalPa	OT	320		
	19 games played 106 goals scored			2 OT 0 GWS	2360	2 hat-tricks 7 shutouts	

February
Date	Home	Score	Visitor	OT	Attn	Notes	Recap
1 February	K-Espoo	5–0	KalPa		105	Shutout recorded by Minja Drufva (5)	
1 February	HIFK	3–1	Kuortane		106		
1 February	Kärpät	8–3	RoKi		205	Hat-trick by Sari Wäänänen (1), four goals total	
14 February	Kuortane	3–2	K-Espoo	GWS	50	Aino Krook scored two goals in regulation and the game-winning shootout goal	
14 February	KalPa	4–3	TPS	GWS	85		
14 February	RoKi	2–10	HIFK		58	Hat-trick by Emmi Juusela (1), six points total	
15 February	KalPa	1–3	TPS		53		
15 February	Ilves	1–4	K-Espoo		70		
15 February	RoKi	0–9	Kuortane		66	Hat-trick by Erika Kankkunen (1); Shutout recorded by Kerttu Kuja-Halkola (4)	
15 February	Kärpät	2–8	HIFK		195	Hat-trick by Julia Kuhta (1)	
21 February	HIFK	2–3	HPK		75		
21 February	Ilves	2–5	Kuortane		80		
21 February	TPS	2–3	Kärpät		67		
22 February	K-Espoo	4–3	Ilves	OT	112		
22 February	HPK	7–1	Kärpät		70		
22 February	TPS	2–3	Kuortane		59		
	16 games played 109 goals scored			1 OT 2 GWS	1456	4 hat-tricks 2 shutouts	

=== Player statistics ===
==== Scoring leaders ====
The following players led the league in points at the conclusion of the regular season on 22 February 2026.

Player	Team	GP	G	A	Pts	PIM
Emma Nuutinen	K-Espoo	28	27	36	63	16
Emmi Juusela	HIFK	32	26	34	60	6
Pauliina Salonen	HIFK	32	26	28	54	30
Barbora Juříčková	HPK	30	22	31	53	16
Ada Eronen	K-Espoo	32	6	42	48	16
Emma Ekoluoma	Ilves	32	22	25	47	8
Matilda Nilsson	Ilves	32	23	23	46	10
Lisette Täks	K-Espoo	32	16	29	45	34
Eva Lamberg	HPK	32	23	17	40	12
Sofia Kari	Kuortane	31	22	18	40	55
Anni Montonen	K-Espoo	30	22	17	39	4
Johanna Juutilainen	Ilves	32	12	27	39	2
Linnea Melotindos	Ilves	30	16	22	38	4
Karoliina Rantamäki	K-Espoo	30	14	22	36	6
Kiira Yrjänen	K-Espoo	28	17	18	35	37
Sari Wäänänen	Kärpät	32	17	17	34	18
Aliisa Toivonen	K-Espoo	31	17	13	30	35
Emmi Loponen	Kärpät	31	10	19	29	69
Maija Koski	TPS	31	14	13	27	2
Ella Turunen	HIFK	21	13	14	27	8

The following skaters were the top point scorers of teams not represented on the scoring leader table at the conclusion of the regular season on 22 February 2026, noted with their overall league scoring rank:

51. Moona Keskisarja, RoKi: 26 GP, 11 G, 5 A, 16 Pts, 8 PIM
63. Emilia Pekkarinen, KalPa: 31 GP, 4 G, 10 A, 14 Pts, 31 PIM

==== Goaltenders ====
The following goaltenders had played at least one-third of their team's minutes in net at the conclusion of the regular season on 22 February 2026, sorted by save percentage.

Player	Team	GPI	TOI	W	L	SA	GA	SO	S%	GAA
Anni Keisala	HPK	18	1056:36	13	4	407	22	6	94.6	1.25
Minja Drufva	K-Espoo	14	804:57	12	1	256	17	5	93.4	1.27
Salla Sivula	KalPa	20	1121:54	4	11	626	42	3	93.3	2.25
Kerttu Kuja-Halkola	Kuortane	16	924:33	10	5	426	30	4	93.0	1.95
Miia Vainio	TPS	15	906:46	7	7	507	37	2	92.7	2.45
Lilia Huovinen	Kuortane	17	1003:15	9	7	479	39	5	91.9	2.33
Tiina Ranne	TPS	19	1016:59	5	11	614	50	0	91.9	2.95
Tiia Pajarinen	K-Espoo	19	1125:24	16	1	383	33	3	91.4	1.76
Janika Järvikari	HIFK	13	727:04	10	1	225	20	2	91.1	1.51
Lilli Packalen	HIFK	20	1194:25	12	7	492	44	2	91.1	2.21
Neea Pohjamo	Ilves	20	1196:31	12	8	504	47	0	90.7	2.36
Pihla Ikonen	HPK	13	688:30	9	2	186	18	2	90.3	1.57
Kati Asikainen	Kärpät	16	873:48	5	9	446	58	0	87.0	3.98
Ronja Pätsi	Kärpät	18	1046:32	2	13	556	74	1	86.7	4.24
Barbora Dalecká	RoKi	11	579:44	0	9	611	86	0	85.9	8.90
Alexandra Väyrynen	RoKi	18	936:21	0	16	1005	168	0	83.3	10.77

=== In-season player movements ===
Note: This section records all in-season player transactions. Player nationality indicates primary nation of IIHF eligibility; some players may hold multiple citizenship.

Player	Nat	Previous team	Joining team	Movement date	ref.
Incoming players
Barbora Dalecká (G)	(Czech Republic)	HTI Stars (NAPrepHL, 2024–25)	RoKi Rovaniemi	9 September 2025	
Claire Peterson (D)	(United States)	UConn Huskies (NCAA D1, 2023–24)	RoKi Rovaniemi	10 October 2025	
Erica Fryer (G)	(Canada)	SDE HF (SDHL, 2024–25)	RoKi Rovaniemi	12 January 2026	
Sophie Lupone (F)	(United States)	MAC Budapest (EWHL, 2024–25)	RoKi Rovaniemi	12 January 2026	
Ada Ukkola (D)	(Finland)	Lukko (N. Mestis)	Kärpät Oulu	22 December 2025	
Stefani Baykusheva (D)	(Bulgaria)	Irbis-Skate Sofia U18 (Bulgaria U18)	RoKi Rovaniemi	13 February 2026	
Intra-league transfers
Jenna Wessman (D)	(Finland)	TPS Turku	Team Kuortane	18 December 2025	
Heta Paasilinna (D)	(Finland)	Kiekko-Espoo	RoKi Rovaniemi	16 January 2026	
Nia Käyhty (F)	(Finland)	Kiekko-Espoo	RoKi Rovaniemi	16 January 2026	
Departing players
Iiris Falck (D)	(Finland)	TPS Turku	Graz99ers Huskies (EWHL)	13 October 2026	
Nellie Karlberg (F)	(Finland)	HIFK	HPK Akatemia (N. Mestis)	31 October 2025	
Iina Kankaanpää (G)	(Finland)	RoKi Rovaniemi	KeuPa HT (N. Mestis)	16 January 2026	
Lea Glosíková (F)	(Slovakia)	TPS Turku	HC Slovan Bratislava (Extraliga žien)	unknown, 5 games with TPS	

==== Loans ====
Player	Nat	Signed team	Loaned team	Details	ref.
Hilpi Hohti (D)	(Finland)	Kiekko-Espoo	RoKi Rovaniemi	7-game loan, 25 October–22 November	
Nia Käyhty (F)	(Finland)	Kiekko-Espoo	RoKi Rovaniemi	7-game loan, 25 October–22 November	
Heta Paasilinna (D)	(Finland)	Kiekko-Espoo	RoKi Rovaniemi	7-game loan, 25 October–22 November	

== Playoffs ==
The 2026 Aurora Borealis Cup playoffs began on 28 February and the Aurora Borealis Cup will be awarded no later than 11 April.

=== Bracket ===
As of 8 April 2026

Quarterfinals
1	Kiekko-Espoo	6	9	5	–	–	3
8	KalPa Kuopio	1	1	1	–	–	0
4	Team Kuortane	1	1	2	–	–	0
5	Ilves Tampere	3	4	5	–	–	3
2	HPK Hämeenlinna	2	5	6	4	–	3
7	Kärpät Oulu	4	1	1	1	–	1
3	IFK Helsinki	4	4	1	2	–	3
6	TPS Turku	3	3	3	0	–	1

Semifinals
Kiekko-Espoo	5	4	5	3	–	–	–	4
Ilves Tampere	4	0	2	2	–	–	–	0
HPK Hämeenlinna	1	3	4	2	5	0	1	4
IFK Helsinki	2	2	1	3	1	4	0	3

Finals
1st place, gold medalist(s)	Kiekko-Espoo	5	2	2	2	3	5	–	4
2nd place, silver medalist(s)	HPK Hämeenlinna	2	1	4	3	2	1	–	2
Bronze medal game
3rd place, bronze medalist(s)	Ilves Tampere	5
4	IFK Helsinki	2

== Qualification ==
The Auroraliiga qualification matches (Auroraliigan karsintaottelut) began on 14 March 2026 and concluded on 21 March. The qualification was played as a best-of-five series between the Pelicans, winners of the Naisten Mestis playoffs, and RoKi, the lowest ranked team from the Auroraliiga regular season. The Pelicans swept the series to earn placement in the 2026–27 Auroraliiga season.

=== Naisten Mestis playoffs ===
The Pelicans Lahti (Finnish: Lahden Pelicans) were the Naisten Mestis point leaders in the 2025–26 regular season, the team's inaugural Mestis season. In the 2026 Naisten Mestis playoffs, the Pelicans swept both the semifinals and finals to claim the playoff champion title and earned the opportunity to contest for a place in the Auroraliiga for the 2026–27 season.

==== Bracket ====
As of 8 March 2026

Quarterfinals
4	KeuPa HT	5	2	4	2
5	APV	1	6	1	1
3	Kiekko-Espoo Ak	7	4	–	2
6	KalPa Ak	2	0	–	0

Semifinals
1	Pelicans	4	3	–	2
4	KeuPa HT	1	0	–	0
2	Lukko	5	6	–	2
3	Kiekko-Espoo Ak	3	5	–	0

Finals
1st place, gold medalist(s)	Pelicans	1	2	2	2
2nd place, silver medalist(s)	Lukko	2	1	0	1
Bronze medal game
4th	KeuPa HT	3
3rd place, bronze medalist(s)	Kiekko-Espoo Ak	6

=== Qualification games ===
The Pelicans Lahti continued their winning streak from the Naisten Mestis playoffs and swept the Auroraliiga qualifiers in three games to earn a place in the 2026–27 Auroraliiga season. RoKi was relegated to the Naisten Mestis after six seasons in the Auroraliiga.

==== Results ====
All times local, Eastern European Time (UTC+2)

Abbreviations: PP = Power play goal (+1 advantage)

14 March 2026; 16:30	RoKi Rovaniemi	2–5 (1–3, 0–1, 1–1)	Pelicans Lahti	Lappi Areena, Rovaniemi; Attendance: 74

Erica Fryer
Goalies
Essi Holopainen
Referee:
Petri Hilli
Linesmen:
Eerik Wedman
Atte Mathlin

Olshansky (Lupone, Sainio) – 02:20	1–0
	1–1	08:47 – PP – Palmroos (Sten, Andersson)
	1–2	13:45 – Andersson (Hokkanen)
	1–3	17:39 – Andersson (Sten)
	1–4	21:36 – Hakala (Puttonen)
Saukkoriipi (Keskisarja) – 56:37	2–4
	2–5	59:15 – Haakana (Andersson, Sten)

10 min
Penalties
4 min
20
Shots
66

15 March 2026; 14:30	RoKi Rovaniemi	1–5 (1–2, 0–2, 0–1)	Pelicans Lahti	Lappi Areena, Rovaniemi; Attendance: 105

Erica Fryer
Goalies
Essi Holopainen
Referee:
Petri Hilli
Linesmen:
Eerik Wedman
Atte Mathlin

	0–1	17:32 – Sten (Hokkanen)
	0–2	19:19 – Sten
Sainio (Olshansky) – 19:39	1–2
	1–3	20:26 – Saari (Andersson)
	1–4	38:42 – Andersson (Haakana, Sten)
	1–5	54:26 – Lampinen (Koskinen)

8 min
Penalties
6 min
25
Shots
40

21 March 2026; 14:00	Pelicans Lahti	6–0 (2–0, 2–0, 2–0)	RoKi Rovaniemi	Wemasto Areena, Lahti; Attendance: 730

Essi Holopainen
Goalies
Erica Fryer
Referee:
Salla-Maaria Raitala
Linesmen:
Julia Halme
Eleonoora Mikkonen

Koskinen (Syrjälä, Palmroos) – 02:37	1–0
Andersson (Haakana) – PP – 10:17	2–0
Hokkanen – 30:59	3–0
Sten (Nieminen, Salmi) – 31:36	4–0
Huopainen (Lehtonen, Markkola) – 53:46	5–0
Andersson (Haakana, Sten) – 57:45	6–0

6 min
Penalties
10 min
35
Shots
20

== Awards and honors ==
- Kultainen Kypärä ('Golden Helmet'): Emma Nuutinen, K-Espoo

=== Finnish Ice Hockey Association awards ===
- Riikka Nieminen Award (Player of the Year): Emma Nuutinen, K-Espoo
- Tuula Puputti Award (Goaltender of the Year): Anni Keisala, HPK
- Päivi Halonen Award (Defender of the Year): Elli Suoranta, Ilves
- Katja Riipi Award (Forward of the Year): Pauliina Salonen, HIFK
- Marianne Ihalainen Award (Top point scorer): Emma Nuutinen, K-Espoo
- Tiia Reima Award (Top goal scorer): Emma Nuutinen, K-Espoo
- Sari Fisk Award (Best plus–minus): Pauliina Salonen, HIFK
- Noora Räty Award (Rookie of the Year): Emmi Loponen, Kärpät
- Emma Laaksonen Award (Fair-play player): Johanna Juutilainen, Ilves
- Hannu Saintula Award (Coach of the Year): Marko Peltoniemi, HPK
- Student Athlete Award: Veera Huotari, HIFK
- Anu Hirvonen Award (Best Referee): Reetta-Kaisa Lusi
- Johanna Suban Award (Best Linesman): Eleonoora Mikkonen

Source(s): Leijonat

=== All-Star team ===
The All-Star team was selected by Auroraliiga coaches.

- Goaltender: Anni Keisala, HPK
- Defenseman: Ada Eronen, K-Espoo
- Defenseman: Elli Suoranta, Ilves
- Left winger: Emmi Juusela, HIFK
- Forward: Pauliina Salonen, HIFK
- Right winger: Emma Nuutinen, K-Espoo

=== Player of the Month ===
- September 2025: Emma Nuutinen (F), Kiekko-Espoo
- October 2025: Elli Suoranta (D), Ilves
- November 2025: Anni Keisala (G), HPK
- December 2025: Emmi Juusela (F), HIFK
- January 2026: Pauliina Salonen (F), HIFK
