= HPK Kiekkonaiset =

Auroraliiga ice hockey team in Hämeenlinna, Finland

- City: Hämeenlinna, Finland
- League: Auroraliiga
- Founded: c. 1999
- Home arena: Pihlajalinna Areena
- Colours: Orange, black, white
- Head coach: Marko Peltoniemi
- Captain: Helen Strömberg
- Media: Hämeen Sanomat
- Affiliates: HPK Akatemia
- Parent club: HPK Liiga Oy
- Website: hpk.fi

Championships
- Regular season titles: 2 (2009–10, 2010–11)
- Aurora Borealis Cup: 1 (2010–11)

Current uniform
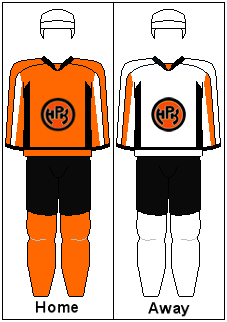

HPK Kiekkonaiset (lit. 'HPK Puck-Women') or HPK Naiset are an ice hockey team in the Auroraliiga, the premier women's ice hockey league in Finland. They play at Pihlajalinna Areena in Hämeenlinna, capital city of the south-central Finnish province of Kanta-Häme. HPK were the first team to receive the Aurora Borealis Cup as the winners of the Finnish Championship in 2011 and also won bronze in the 2011–12 IIHF European Women's Champions Cup.

They are the representative women's ice hockey team of the multi-sport club Hämeenlinnan Pallokerho (HPK), however, the team is directly owned by HPK Liiga Oy, the ownership organization of the Liiga team HPK. HPK Kiekkonaiset are one of two Auroraliiga teams owned directly by a men's league team.

== History ==
A women's ice hockey team has competed under the parent club HPK since at least 1999. From 1999 to 2008, HPK Kiekkonaiset competed in the Naisten I-divisioona (renamed Naisten Mestis in 2013). In 2001, the team qualified to contend for promotion to the Naisten SM-sarja (NSMs; called Naisten Liiga during 2017–2024 and rebranded as Auroraliiga in 2024) in the league's karsintasarja (qualification series) but they lost eleven of fourteen qualification games and remained in the I-divisoona. The opportunity for promotion through the karsintasarja returned in the 2007–08 season and, this time, with a roster that included Meeri Räisänen, Essi Salminen, Hanne Sikiö, and Eveliina Similä, HPK achieved promotion to the Naisten SM-sarja.

HPK debuted in the Naisten SM-sarja at the opening of the 2008–09 season, strengthened by the addition of a number of experienced players, notably Petra Herzigová, Katja Riipi, Nora Tallus, and Vilma Vaattovaara. The team won the bronze medal match against Oulun Kärpät with a game winning goal from Riipi.

HPK was the first team to be awarded the Aurora Borealis Cup the Naisten SM-sarja Champions in 2011.

As the 2011 Finnish Champions, the team was automatically granted placement in the second round, Group E of the following season's IIHF European Women's Champions Cup (EWCC). The Group E round-robin was contested in Hämeenlinna during 2 to 4 December 2011 and HPK bested ESC Planegg, Aisulu Almaty, and the EHV Sabres to sweep the series and earn a berth in the tournament finals. Venla Hovi and Riikka Noronen led all Group E skaters in scoring, with 9 points and 7 points in four games, respectively. The EWCC Finals were also hosted in Hämeenlinna and were played during 24 to 26 February 2012 at Metritiski Areena. HPK won their first match, beating ESC Planegg with a score of 3–2, but they were unable to overcome the scoring power and excellent goaltending of their final two opponents, losing 2–6 to Tornado Moscow Region and 1–5 to the ZSC Lions Frauen. They were awarded European Women's Champions Cup bronze medals, becoming the third Finnish team to medal in the EWCC.

In June 2021, it was announced that the team would be transferred to HPK Liiga Oy, owner of the HPK Liiga team and the U20 SM-sarja team HPK U20. HPK Kiekkonaiset had previously been a part of the HPK-affiliated junior ice hockey club HPK Edustusjääkiekko Ry, a non-profit registered association. At the time of the transfer, Antti Toivanen, CEO of HPK Liiga Oy and general manager of the HPK men's team, explained that the move was motivated by an interest in capitalizing on the growing women's ice hockey market, which had been highlighted by the record crowds that attended the 2019 IIHF Women's World Championship in Espoo. Jorma Hassinen, general manager of HPK Kiekkonaiset, expressed hope that the transfer would allow female players to develop with the same opportunities as their male counterparts.

== Season-by-season results ==
This is a partial list of the most recent seasons completed by HPK Naiset.
Note: Finish = Rank at end of regular season; GP = Games played, W = Wins (3 points), OTW = Overtime wins (2 points), OTL = Overtime losses (1 point), L = Losses, GF = Goals for, GA = Goals against, Pts = Points, Top scorer: Points (Goals+Assists)

Season	League	Regular season										Postseason results
Season	League	Finish	GP	W	OTW	OTL	L	GF	GA	Pts	Top scorer	Postseason results
2017–18	Naisten Liiga	4th	30	16	1	3	10	87	66	53	(Finland) A. Kaitala 37 (17+20)	Lost quarterfinals to Kuortane, 0–3
2018–19	Naisten Liiga	6th	30	16	0	3	11	98	87	51	(Finland) J. Liikala 33 (11+22)	Lost quarterfinals to Kärpät, 0–3
2019–20	Naisten Liiga	4th	30	18	1	4	7	109	71	60	(Finland) R. Noronen 41 (15+26)	Lost quarterfinals to Kuortane, 2–3
2020–21	Naisten Liiga	5th	29	13	2	3	11	85	78	46	(Finland) R. Noronen 33 (13+20)	Lost quarterfinals to Ilves, 0–2
2021–22	Naisten Liiga	7th	30	17	2	1	10	114	80	56	(Finland) K. Seikkula 34 (19+15)	Lost quarterfinals to HIFK, 1–3
2022–23	Naisten Liiga	4th	36	20	3	1	12	116	78	67	(Slovakia) J. Matejková 43 (15+28)	Lost bronze medal game to KalPa, 1–3
2023–24	Naisten Liiga	3rd	32	21	0	3	8	120	68	66	(Finland) K. Seikkula 45 (22+23)	Lost bronze medal game to KalPa, 1–3
2024–25	Auroraliiga	2nd	32	22	1	3	6	133	71	71	(Finland) K. Seikkula 59 (29+30)	(silver) Championship runner up to K-Espoo, 1–4
2025–26	Auroraliiga	2nd	32	23	3	1	5	145	45	76	(Czech Republic) B. Juříčková 53 (22+31)	(silver) Championship runner up to K-Espoo, 2–4

== Players and personnel ==
=== 2026–27 roster ===
As of 16 November 2026

No.	Nat	Player	Pos	S/G	Age	Acquired	Birthplace
25	(Finland)	Emma Andersson	F	L	20	2024	
39	(Finland)	Leni Granroth	F	L	18	2025	Vantaa, Uusimaa
8	(Finland)	Iiris Hämäläinen	D	L	18	2024	Urjala, Pirkanmaa
42	(Finland)	Pihla Ikonen	G	L	17	2024	Kangasniemi, South Savo
45	(Finland)	Emma Katajamäki	F	L	28	2025	Seinäjoki, South Ostrobothnia
24	(Finland)	Heidi Kokora	F	L	21	2025	Kiuruvesi, North Savo
21	(Finland)	Kaisla Kortelainen	F	L	25	2026	Nurmes, North Karelia
5	(Finland)	Laura Kuukasjärvi	D	L	22	2022	
26	(Finland)	Julia Kuusisto	F	L	20	2026	Vaasa, Ostrobothnia
61	(Finland)	Aada Käppi	F	L	19	2025	Kerava, Uusimaa
16	(Finland)	Viola Kärkkäinen	D	L	17	2026	Kiuruvesi, North Savo
23	(Finland)	Eva Lamberg	F	R	18	2023	Hämeenlinna, Kanta-Häme
11	(Denmark)	My Lau	D	L	19	2026	Odense, Fyns Amt, Denmark
27	(Finland)	Liisa Lindholm	G	L	18	2024	
19	(Finland)	Emmi Loponen	F	L	17	2026	Oulu, North Ostrobothnia
3	(Canada)	Paige McGuire	F	L	22	2026	Barrie, Ontario, Canada
51	(Finland)	Daria Molchun	F	L	16	2026	Petrozavodsk, Karelia, Russia
91	(Finland)	Neea Pelkonen	F	L	21	2025	Kiukainen, Satakunta
14	(Finland)	Noora Puhto	F	L	18	2024	Kerava, Uusimaa
89	(Finland)	Riia Saarni	D	R	19	2026	Lohja, Uusimaa
15	(Finland)	Mikaela Saukkonen (A)	D	L	26	2024	Hyvinkää, Uusimaa
41	(Finland)	Sade Siltaniemi	F	L	15	2026	Järvenpää, Uusimaa
38	(Finland)	Alisa Skog	F	L	22	2020	Vihti, Uusimaa
12	(Finland)	Helen Strömberg (C)	F	L	30	2026	Hollola, Päijät-Häme
–	(Canada)	Katie Sweeney	G	–	25	2026	Tecumseh, Ontario, Canada
20	(Finland)	Aino-Emilia Tammisto	D	L	18	2026	Nokia, Pirkanmaa
31	(Finland)	Miia Vainio	G	L	22	2026	Nurmijärvi, Uusimaa
10	(Finland)	Vanessa Viitala	F	L	21	2022	Nivala, North Ostrobothnia
6	(Finland)	Daniela Wilkman	D	L	22	2020	Vantaa, Uusimaa

Coaching staff and team personnel

- Head coach: Marko Peltoniemi
- Assistant coach: Riikka Noronen
- Goaltending coach: Anni Keisala
- Team manager: Riikka Noronen
- Head equipment manager: Enni Peltoniem

=== Team captaincy history ===
- Nora Tallus, 2008–2010
- Mira Huhta, 2010–2013
- Riikka Noronen, 2013–2017
- Jutta Stoltenberg, 2017–2019
- Riikka Noronen, 2019–2021
- Heta Seikkula, 2021–2026
- Helen Strömberg, 2026–

=== Head coaches ===
- Tuomo Nukari, 2011–January 2013
- Jarkko Julkunen, January 2013 – 2013
- Vesa Mäkinen, 2014–2016
- Marko Rahikainen, 2016–2018
- Markku Pirttiniemi, 2018–19
- Katja Pasanen, 2019–20
- Mari Saarinen, 2020–21
- Harri Nummela, 2021–22
- Jari Risku, 2022–2025
- Marko Peltoniemi, 2025–

== Team honours ==
=== Finnish Championship ===
Since 2011, the victorious team of the Auroraliiga playoffs has received the Aurora Borealis Cup. Prior to 2011, the title-winners of the league were awarded the Sammon -malja. The players of the victorious team also receive gold medals as Finnish Champions in women's ice hockey.

- (gold) Aurora Borealis Cup (1): 2011
- (silver) Runners-up (2): 2016, 2025, 2026
- (bronze) Third Place (4): 2009, 2010, 2012, 2014

=== European Women's Champions Cup ===
The IIHF European Women's Champions Cup was an annual women's ice hockey club tournament, contested by the national champions from a number of European nations

- (bronze) Bronze (1): 2012

== Notable alumnae ==
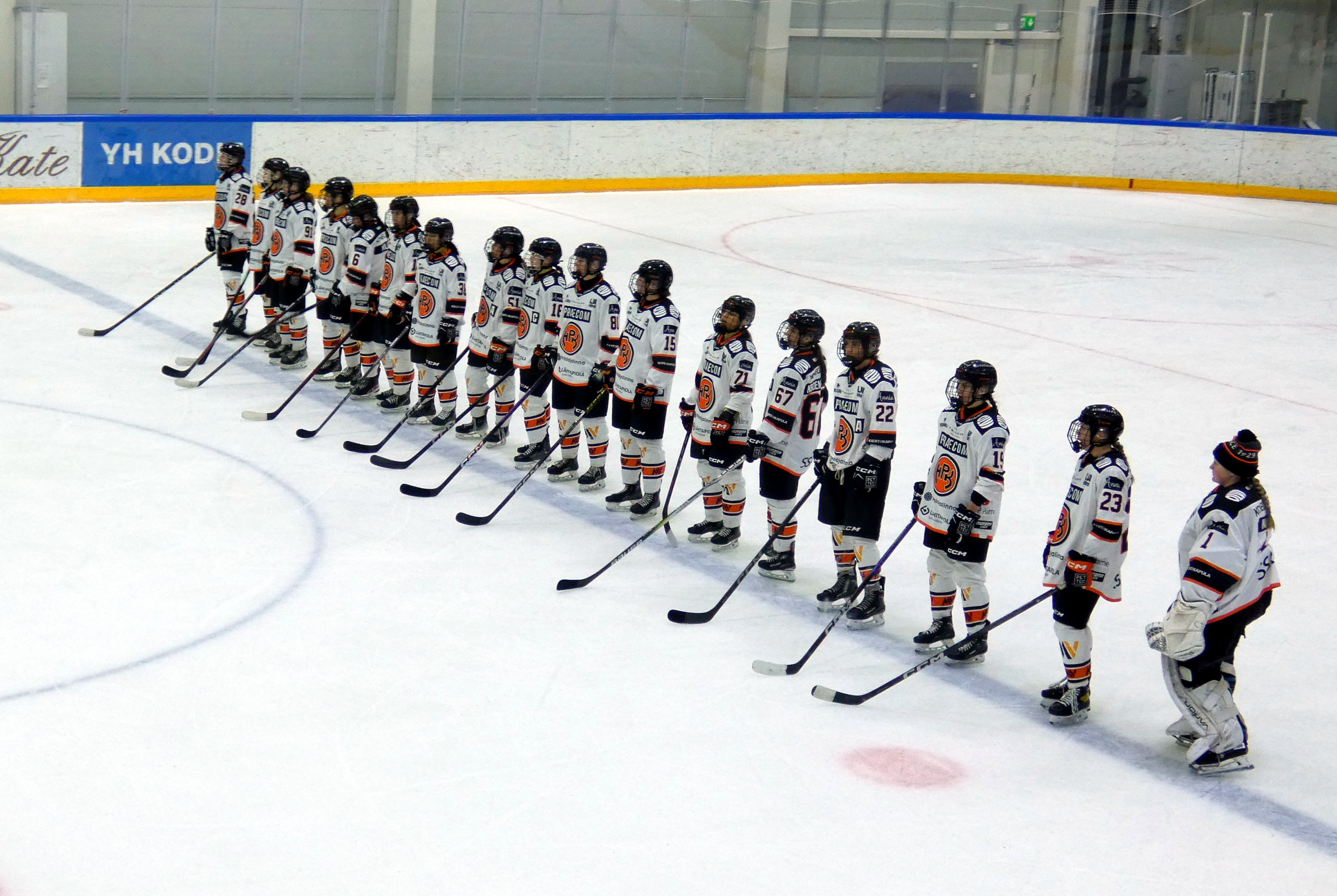
HPK players during the 2024–25 season

Seasons active with HPK listed alongside player name.

- Maija Hassinen-Sullanmaa, 2008–2015 & 2017–18
- Venla Hovi, 2010–2012
- Anni Keisala, 2024–2026
- Sanna Lankosaari, 2009–2012
- Julia Liikala, 2016–2021
- Riikka Noronen, 2009–2017 & 2018–2022
- Annina Rajahuhta, 2010–2012
- Meeri Räisänen, 2017–18
- Eveliina Similä, 2008–2012
- Jutta Stoltenberg, 2008–2026
- Susanna Tapani, 2014–2016
- Vilma Vaattovaara, 2008–2011
- Tea Villilä, 2010–11 & 2015–16

=== International players ===
- (Switzerland) Nicole Andenmatten, 2021–22
- (United States) Samantha Benoit, 2021–22
- (United States) Kristina Brown, 2014–15
- (Slovakia) Lenka Čurmová, 2020–21
- (Canada) Megan Delay, 2021–22
- (Slovenia) Pia Dukarič, 2019–20
- (Czech Republic) Karolína Erbanová, 2022–23
- (Netherlands) Eline Gabriele, 2023–24
- (Italy) Manuela Heidenberger, 2024–2026
- (Czech Republic) Petra Herzigová, 2008–09 & 2013–2015
- (Slovakia) Lucia Ištocyová, 2021–22
- (Czech Republic) Barbora Juříčková, 2022–2026
- (Czech Republic) Adéla Jůzková, 2020–21
- (Czech Republic) Anna Kalová, 2025–26
- (Slovakia) Iveta Klimášová, 2023–24
- (Slovakia) Lívia Kúbeková, 2021–22
- (Japan) Natsumi Kurokawa, 2019–20
- (France) Margaux Mameri, September–November 2022
- (Czech Republic) Tereza Mašková, 2025–26
- (Slovakia) Júlia Matejková, 2021–2025
- (Czech Republic) Tereza Pištěková, 2023–24
- (Czech Republic) Alena Polenská, September–November 2021
- (Canada) Kassidy Sauvé, 2021–22 & 2023–24
- (Japan) Miho Shishiuchi, 2014–2016
- (Norway) Iben Tillman, 2024–2026
- (Czech Republic) Anna Vaníčková, 2023–24
- (Slovakia) Sofia Vysokajová, 2021–22
- (United States) Hannah Westbrook, 2012–13
- (Slovakia) Lucia Záborská, 2022–23
- (Czech Republic) Anna Zíková, 2022–23

== See also ==
- Women's ice hockey in Finland
- Finland women's national ice hockey team
- Finland women's national under-18 ice hockey team
