= Lahti Pelicans Naiset =

Auroraliiga ice hockey team in Lahti, Finland

- City: Lahti, Finland
- League: Auroraliiga
- Founded: 2020
- Home arena: Wemasto Areena
- Colours: Turquoise, navy blue, black, orange
- Owner: Lahden Pelicans Oy
- Head coach: Petteri Hirvonen
- Captain: Eevi Ilvonen
- Media: Etelä-Suomen Sanomat

Franchise history
- 1998–2001: Kiekkoreipas
- 2006–2016: Pelicans 2000
- 2020–: Pelicans

The Lahti Pelicans Naiset, known in Finnish as Lahden Pelicans Naiset, ('Lahti's Pelicans Women') or simply Pelicans Naiset, are an ice hockey team in the Auroraliiga. They play at Wemasto Areena in Lahti, the capital city of the Päijät-Häme region in southern-central Finland. The team was promoted from the Naisten Mestis to the Auroraliiga in the 2026 postseason and the Pelicans made their debut in the Finnish Championship (SM) league in the 2026–27 Auroraliiga season.

== History ==
Pelicans Naiset was reestablished in 2020 by Junior-Pelicans ry, a youth and recreational ice hockey association affiliated with the Pelicans men's professional team in the Liiga. The new team was built on the foundation laid by the Pelicans 2000 Naiset, which had played in the Naisten Suomi-sarja and Naisten Mestis from 2006 until disbanding in 2016 due to player shortages.

The reconstituted team was coached by Martti Rask, who had previously coached the Pelicans 2000 to a silver medal finish in the 2015–16 Naisten Mestis season. The team practiced at SOL Arena in Lahti but their homve venue was Hollolan jäähalli (also known as HAT-areena) in neighboring Hollola.

The 2020–21 season was cancelled due to public health concerns surrounding the COVID-19 pandemic after the Pelicans had played (and lost) twelve qualification games. Rask was joined behind the bench by Kari Eloranta in the 2021–22 season as the team did not qualify for the Naisten Mestis regular season after ranking fourth of five teams in Lohko 1 ('Group 1') of the Naisten Mestis qualification and continued in the Naisten Suomi-sarja regular season.

In May 2022, Janne Saarinen was announced as the team's new head coach to replace Martti Rask. Mikko Kurkela joined the coaching team and Henri Hänninen was appointed goaltending coach along with Saarinen,

Under Saarinen, the team continued to generate middling results, as they did not earn Naisten Mestis qualification and finished the 2022–23 Naisten Suomi-sarja season in fourth place. They improved to a second place finish in the 2023–24 Naisten Suomi-sarja season before losing the bronze medal match in the league playoffs.

Petteri Hiirvonen was appointed new head coach in May 2024 on a two season contract. He came to the team with nearly a decade of experience across the 2000s and 2010s as an assistant coach with men's Liiga teams and having served for many years as head coach of Mestis and U20 SM-sarja teams. After stepping away from coaching in 2017, he returned in 2022 as an assistant coach in the Austrian women's national program, working with the national team and under-18 national team.

The first season with Hiirvonen at the helm was an enormous success in which the team won nineteen of their 21 games in the Naisten Suomi-sarja regular season and claimed first place in the league. Pelicans went on to sweep the Naisten Mestis qualification series in the postseason and to earn promotion to the second-tier league.

Pelicans entered the 2025–26 Mestis season with the goal of promotion to the Auroraliiga. After achieving 25 wins in 28 games during the regular season, they beat Lukko in the playoff finals to win the Mestis championship title and earnd placement in the Auroraliiga qualification series. Pelicans then faced RoKi, the last place team from the Auroraliiga regular season, in the best-of-five qualification series and earned promotion to the Auroraliiga in a three game sweep.

== Season-by-season results ==
The following table lists all seasons completed by the Pelicans since the team's re-establishment in 2020.
Note: Finish = Rank at end of regular season; GP = Games played, W = Wins (3 points), OTW = Overtime/shootout wins (2 points), T = Ties (1 point), OTL = Overtime/shootout losses (1 point), L = Losses, GF = Goals for, GA = Goals against, Pts = Points, Top scorer: Points (Goals+Assists)

Season	League	Qualification series and regular season											Postseason results
Season	League	Finish	GP	W	OTW	T	OTL	L	GF	GA	Pts	Top scorer	Postseason results
2020–21	Naisten Mestis Q	6th in Lohko 2	12	0	1	—N/a	2	9	14	55	4 (Note: 0.33 points per game; teams were ranked by point average rather than point total during the Naisten Mestis qualification series in 2020–21.)	(Finland) E. Ojapalo 7 (2+5)	—N/a
2020–21	Naisten Suomi-sarja	Season cancelled due to COVID-19 pandemic											
2021–22	Naisten Mestis Q	4th in Lohko 1	16	4	1	—N/a	1	10	33	50	15 (Note: 0.94 points per game; teams were ranked by point average rather than point total during the Naisten Mestis qualification series in 2021–22.)	(Finland) K. Koskinen 11 (9+2)	—N/a
2021–22	Naisten Suomi-sarja	2nd in Lohko 2	12	7	—N/a	0	—N/a	5	51	22	14 (Note: 1.17 points per game; teams were ranked by point average rather than point total during the Naisten Suomi-sarja regular season in 2021–22.)	(Finland) E. Ojapalo 20 (6+14)	Did not qualify for playoffs
2022–23	Naisten Mestis Q	4th in Lohko 1	16	5	1	—N/a	1	9	43	67	18	(Finland) M. Huvinen 13 (8+5)	—N/a
2022–23	Naisten Suomi-sarja	4th in Lohko 1	12	7	—N/a	1	—N/a	4	55	23	15	(Finland) J. Saari 19 (15+4)	Did not qualify for playoffs
2023–24	Naisten Suomi-sarja	2nd in Lohko 1	GP	W	—N/a	T	—N/a	L	GF	GA	Pts	(Finland) M. Huvinen 41 (19+22)	Did not qualify for playoffs
2024–25	Naisten Suomi-sarja	1st in Lohko 1	21	19	—N/a	1	—N/a	1	118	21	39	(Finland) J. Sten 31 (17+14)	↑ Promoted to Naisten Mestis
2025–26	Naisten Mestis	1st	28	23	2	—N/a	1	2	108	38	74	(Finland) J. Andersson 30 (11+19)	Won championship vs Lukko, 2–1
2025–26	Naisten Mestis	1st	28	23	2	—N/a	1	2	108	38	74	(Finland) J. Andersson 30 (11+19)	↑ Promoted to Auroraliiga

== Players and personnel ==
=== 2026–27 roster ===
As of 16 November 2026

No.	Nat	Player	Pos	S/G	Age	Acquired	Birthplace
24	(Finland)	Jeannette Andersson	F	L	26	2023	Loviisa, Uusimaa
33	(Finland)	Mira Eskola	G	L	34	2023	Hausjärvi, Kanta-Häme
27	(Finland)	Iiris Falck	D	L	26	2026	Anjalankoski, Kymenlaakso
11	(Finland)	Siiri Frederiksen	F	L	18	2026	Turku, Central Finland
30	(Finland)	Essi Holopainen	G	L	32	2022	Kotka, Kymenlaakso
29	(Finland)	Jonna Huopainen	F	L	22	2025	
54	(Finland)	Pihla Häämeenniemi	F	L	26	2026	Seinäjoki, South Ostrobothnia
26	(Finland)	Eevi Ilvonen (C)	F	L	29	2026	Lappeenranta, South Karelia
10	(Finland)	Riikka Järvinen (L)	D	L	26	2026	Kotka, Kymenlaakso
12	(Finland)	Mimmi Keinonen	D	L	22	2026	
48	(Finland)	Aada Ketola	F	L	20	2026	
77	(Japan)	Kiku Kobayashi	G	L	24	2026	Karuizawa, Nagano, Japan
4	(Finland)	Sanna Kolehmainen	D	L	32	2025	Järvenpää, Uusimaa
30	(Finland)	Elisa Korajoki	G	L	20	2025	
16	(Finland)	Karita Koskinen	F	L	22	2020	Kouvola, Kymenlaakso
9	(Finland)	Jenina Lampinen (L)	D	R	20	2026	Kuusankoski, Kymenlaakso
28	(Finland)	Saimi Lehto	F	L	24	2026	Riihimäki, Kanta-Häme
17	(Finland)	Elisa Lehtonen	F	L	18	2025	
25	(Finland)	Jemina Lepola (A)	F	L	20	2026	Haapajärvi, North Ostrobothnia
3	(Finland)	Lotta Leskinen	D	L	24	2026	Järvenpää, Uusimaa
21	(Finland)	Jade Mäkivaara	F	L	29	2026	Kauhajoki, South Ostrobothnia
18	(Finland)	Eveliina Nieminen	D	L	30	2025	Mäntsälä, Uusimaa
29	(Finland)	Pinja Niemistö	F	L	23	2026	
10	(Finland)	Heta Paasilinna (L)	D	L	21	2026	Tampere, Satakunta
88	(Finland)	Paula Palmroos (A)	D	L	25	2024	
49	(Finland)	Veera Paroinen	F	L	21	2026	
19	(Finland)	Janina Saari (A)	F	L	23	2022	Kouvola, Kymenlaakso
20	(Finland)	Viivi Salmi	F	L	20	2025	
64	(Finland)	Jannika Sten	F	L	18	2023	Hollola, Päijät-Häme
84	(Finland)	Lilli Syrjälä	D	L	24	2024	

Coaching staff and team personnel

- Head coach: Petteri Hirvonen
- Assistant coach: Lauri Valkeamäki
- Assistant coach: Lucia Záborská
- Goaltending coach: Hanna Mäkinen
- Team manager: Outi Sten
- Equipment managers: Petteri Ahola & Mikko Pantsari

=== Team captaincy history ===
- Eliina Ojapalo, 2020–2022
- Iida Puttonen, 2023–24
- Paula Palmroos, 2024–25
- Mia Huvinen, 2025–26
- Eevi Ilvonen, 2026–

=== Head coaches ===
- Martti Rask, 2020–2022
- Janne Saarinen, 2022–2024
- Petteri Hirvonen, 2024–
