= HIFK Naiset =

Auroraliiga ice hockey team in Helsinki, Finland

IFK Helsinki Naiset Stadin Gimmat
- City: Helsinki
- League: Auroraliiga
- Founded: 1982; Refounded 2018
- Home arena: Pirkkolan jäähalli
- Colours: Red, white, dark blue
- General manager: Saara Kivenmäki
- Head coach: Saara Kivenmäki
- Captain: Ilona Palin
- Media: Helsingin Sanomat
- Affiliates: HIFK Akatemia
- Parent club: HIFK Ishockey rf
- Website: Official website

Franchise history
- 1982–1989: HIFK Naiset
- 2018–present: HIFK Naiset (Stadin Gimmat)

Championships
- Regular season titles: 1 (2022–23)
- Aurora Borealis Cup: 2 (2023, 2024)

Current uniform
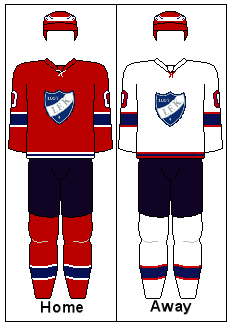

IFK Helsinki Naiset (Swedish: IFK Helsingfors Dam), abbreviated HIFK Naiset (HIFK Dam) and also known by the Helsinki slang nickname Stadin Gimmat (lit. 'The Girls of Helsinki'), is an ice hockey team in the Finnish Auroraliiga. They play at the Pirkkolan jäähalli (lit. 'Pirkkola ice rink') in the Pirkkola district of Helsinki. The team is the representative women's ice hockey team of the multisport club Idrottsföreningen Kamraterna, Helsingfors (HIFK) and is operated by Oy HIFK-Hockey Ab, the same organization that owns the HIFK men's ice hockey team of the Liiga – HIFK Naiset are one of only two Auroraliiga teams owned directly by a Liiga team.

The original HIFK Naiset was one of the ten founding teams from the inaugural 1982–83 Naisten SM-sarja season but they were financially relegated in 1989 and the club chose not to pursue women's ice hockey for the following several decades. The current team was established in 2018 and gained promotion to the Auroraliiga (then called the Naisten Liiga) from the second-tier Naisten Mestis at the end of their debut season in 2018–19.

HIFK-Stadin Gimmat has two affiliate teams, HIFK Akatemia and HIFK Challenger (known as HIFK U18 from 2018 to 2023), which are active in the Naisten Mestis and Naisten Suomi-sarja, respectively.

== History ==
=== Original team, 1982–1989 ===
HIFK Naiset was one of the original ten teams to play in the inaugural season, 1982–83, of the Naisten SM-sarja (lit. 'Women's Finnish Championship Series'; renamed Naisten Liiga in 2017 and Auroraliiga in 2024). The team struggled early on, forced to compete with fellow Helsinki-based team Helsingin Jääkiekkoklubi (HJK) for top talent. HIFK finished in the bottom half of the league in their first five seasons, ranking seventh of ten teams in 1982–83, ninth of twelve in 1983–84, eighth of thirteen in 1984–85, fifth of eight in 1985–86, and sixth of eight in 1986–87.

The team's fortunes turned in the 1987–88 season and they earned a 7-2-5 (win-tie-loss) record with a +3 goal difference and claimed third place in the Naisten SM-sarja playoffs, earning Finnish Championship bronze. With a 1988–89 roster that included three members of the newly-created Finnish women's national ice hockey team – defensemen Johanna Ikonen and Maria Turki (Novitsky), and forward Ulla Saarikko – HIFK continued their upward trajectory, posting an 8-2-4 record with a +20 goal differential and claiming Finnish Championship bronze for the second consecutive season.

Despite the marked improvement of the team, HIFK was financially relegated after the 1988–89 season and no senior women's representative team or any programs for women and girls existed in the club for the following twenty-five years.

== Season-by-season results ==
This is a list of all seasons completed by HIFK Naiset, including the original HIFK Naiset (1982–1989) and HIFK Naiset-Stadin Gimmat (2018–present).

Note: Finish = Rank at end of regular season; GP = Games played, W = Wins (3 points), OTW = Overtime/shootout wins (2 points), T = Ties (1 point), OTL = Overtime/shootout losses (1 point), L = Losses, GF = Goals for, GA = Goals against, Pts = Points, Top scorer: Points (Goals+Assists)

Season	League	Preliminaries and regular season											Postseason results
Season	League	Finish	GP	W	OTW	T	OTL	L	GF	GA	Pts	Top scorer	Postseason results
1982–83	Naisten SM-sarja	7th	8	3	—N/a	0	—N/a	5	43	26	6	(Finland) S-L. Aura 17 (15+2)	Did not qualify
1983–84	Naisten SM-sarja	9th	8	2	—N/a	0	—N/a	6	27	42	4	(Finland) M. Böckelman 10 (5+5)	Did not qualify
1984–85	Naisten SM-sarja	8th	9	3	—N/a	0	—N/a	6	26	29	6	(Finland) A. Kaunola 8 (6+2)	Did not qualify
1985–86	Naisten SM-sarja	5th	14	3	—N/a	4	—N/a	7	36	40	10	(Finland) H. Leppälä 11 (7+4)	Did not qualify
1986–87	Naisten SM-sarja	6th	14	6	—N/a	0	—N/a	8	33	39	12	Two players 10 (9+1); (Finland) S. Aksela; (Finland) A. Kaunola	Did not qualify
1987–88	Naisten SM-sarja	3rd	14	7	—N/a	2	—N/a	5	35	32	16	(Finland) A. Kaunola 13 (11+2)	Won bronze medal
1988–89	Naisten SM-sarja	3rd	14	8	—N/a	2	—N/a	4	53	33	18	(Finland) A. Kaunola 22 (15+7)	Won bronze medal
2018–19	Naisten Mestis	1st	26	24	1	—N/a	0	1	159	26	74	(Finland) Mi. Klemola 50 (23+27)	Promoted to Naisten Liiga
2019–20	Naisten Liiga	7th	30	15	2	—N/a	3	10	124	74	52	(France) E. Passard 47 (28+19)	Lost quarterfinals to Kärpät, 0–3
2020–21	Naisten Liiga	3rd	27	16	4	—N/a	1	6	104	57	57	(France) E. Passard 37 (19+21)	Won bronze medal, 2–1 (Ilves)
2021–22	Naisten Liiga	2nd	29	26	0	—N/a	0	3	137	41	78	(Finland) M. Nilsson 55 (37+18)	Runner-up, 2–3 (K-Espoo)
2022–23	Naisten Liiga	1st	36	29	3	—N/a	0	4	197	57	93	(Czech Republic) M. Pejzlová 82 (32+50)	Won Championship, 3–0 (K-Espoo)
2023–24	Naisten Liiga	2nd	32	27	0	—N/a	0	5	175	49	75	(Czech Republic) M. Pejzlová 71 (30+41)	Won Championship, 3–1 (K-Espoo)
2024–25	Auroraliiga	4th	32	20	1	—N/a	2	9	113	81	64	(Finland) P. Salonen 34 (16+18)	Lost quarterfinals to Ilves, 2–3
2025–26	Auroraliiga	3rd	32	22	9	—N/a	3	7	137	68	69	(Finland) E. Juusela 60 (26+34)	Lost bronze medal match to Ilves, 2–5

== Players and personnel ==
=== 2026–27 roster ===
As of 16 November 2026

No.	Nat	Player	Pos	S/G	Age	Acquired	Birthplace
7	(Finland)	Nelly Andersson	D	R	19	2022	Kotka, Kymenlaakso
85	(France)	Clémence Boudin	F	L	18	2026	
55	(France)	Sehana Galbrun	F	L	21	2024	Saint-Martin-d'Hères, ARA, France
22	(Finland)	Aada Holm	D	L	20	2024	Mäntsälä, Uusimaa
14	(Finland)	Heidi Holmberg	F	L	20	2024	Mikkeli, South Savo
24	(Finland)	Olivia Huttunen	F	R	19	2024	Helsinki, Uusimaa
10	(Finland)	Liisa Kastikainen	F	L	26	2026	Outokumpu, North Karelia
36	(Finland)	Julia Kuhta	F	L	18	2024	Helsinki, Uusimaa
21	(Finland)	Kerttu Kuja-Halkola	G	L	19	2026	Janakkala, Kanta-Häme
92	(Finland)	Olivia Kylliäinen (A)	D	R	22	2020	Lappeenranta, South Karelia
16	(Finland)	Meeri Lampi	F	L	17	2026	Nurmijärvi, Uusimaa
91	(Finland)	Emma Lappalainen	F	L	21	2024	Ivalo, Inari, Lapland
77	(Finland)	Iida Lappalainen	F	L	21	2024	Ivalo, Inari, Lapland
25	(Finland)	Aino Lehikoinen	F	L	17	2024	Helsinki, Uusimaa
17	(Finland)	Emilia Malinen	F	L	26	2026	Pyhäjärvi, North Ostrobothnia
1	(Finland)	Nelli Nieminen	G	L	20	2024	Vantaa, Uusimaa
70	(Finland)	Lilli Packalén	G	L	22	2025	Helsinki, Uusimaa
12	(Finland)	Ilona Palin (C)	D	L	20	2021	Raasepori, Uusimaa
29	(Finland)	Anni Pere (A)	F	L	23	2018	Loviisa, Uusimaa
74	(France)	Maéli Raigneau	D	R	18	2026	
10	(Japan)	Lunasa Sano	F	L	28	2026	Tokyo, Kantō, Japan
39	(Finland)	Sara Suhonen	F	L	21	2022	Vantaa, Uusimaa
28	(Finland)	Tinja Tapani (L)	F	L	17	2026	Laitila, Southwest Finland
96	(Finland)	Tytti Teräväinen	D	L	18	2025	Jyväskylä, Central Finland
13	(Finland)	Anni Timonen	D	R	24	2026	Tarvasjoki, Southwest Finland
19	(Finland)	Ella Turunen	F	L	20	2024	Vantaa, Uusimaa
26	(Finland)	Satu-Maaria Vihervuori	D	L	22	2019	Vantaa, Uusimaa
37	(Finland)	Emma Vilén	D	L	18	2025	Helsinki, Uusimaa

Coaching staff and team personnel

- Head coach: Saara Kivenmäki
- Assistant coach: (Hungary) Bertalan Szolga
- Goaltending coach: Iina Kuusela
- Conditioning coach: Virpi Rajala
- Team manager: Maikku Lehikoinen
- Equipment manager: Timo Nikunen, Riikka Ahola & Jukka Ahola
- Physical therapist: Virpi Rajala

=== Team captaincy history ===
- Saara Suomikallio, 2018–19 (Mestis)
- Karoliina Rantamäki, 2019–2024
- Athéna Locatelli, 2024–2026
- Ilona Palin, 2026–

=== Head coaches ===
- Saara Kivenmäki, 2018–

== Awards and honors ==
=== Finnish Championship ===
- (gold) Aurora Borealis Cup (2): 2023, 2024
- (silver) Runners-up (1): 2022
- (bronze) Third Place (3): 1988, 1989, 2021

=== Player awards ===
- Päivi Halonen Award (Defender of the Year)

2022–23: Siiri Yrjölä
2023–24: Siiri Yrjölä

- Päivi Halonen Award (Forward of the Year)

2025–26: Pauliina Salonen

- Noora Räty Award (Rookie of the Year)

2019–20: Krista Parkkonen
2022–23: Sanni Vanhanen

- Marianne Ihalainen Award (Top point scorer)

2020–21: Michaela Pejzlová
2022–23: Michaela Pejzlová
2023–24: Michaela Pejzlová

- Tiia Reima Award (Top goal scorer)

2021–22: Matilda Nilsson

- Sari Fisk Award (Best plus–minus)

2022–23: Michaela Pejzlová
2023–24: Clara Rozier
2025–26: Pauliina Salonen

- Emma Laaksonen Award (Fair-play player)

2021–22: Emmanuelle Passard

- Karoliina Rantamäki Award (Playoff MVP)

2022–23: Sanni Vanhanen
2023–24: Clara Rozier

- Hannu Saintula Award (Coach of the Year)

2020–21: Saara Niemi
2022–23: Saara Niemi

- Scholar-Athlete of the Year

2020–21: Anni Hietaharju
2022–23: Michaela Pejzlová

==== All-Stars ====
Auroraliiga All-Star teams are selected by Auroraliiga coaches at the conclusion of the regular season. Prior to the 2023–24 season, All-Star teams were selected by the Finnish Ice Hockey Association.
First Team

- 2022–23: Julia Liikala (RW), Michaela Pejzlová (C), Siiri Yrjölä (D)
- 2023–24: Michaela Pejzlová (C), Siiri Yrjölä (D)
- 2025–26: Emmi Juusela (LW), Pauliina Salonen (C)

Second Team

- 2020–21: Athéna Locatelli (D), Krista Parkkonen (D), Michaela Pejzlová (C)
- 2021–22: Iina Kuusela (G), Matilda Nilsson (RW), Krista Parkkonen (D), Michaela Pejzlová (C)
- 2023–24: Julia Liikala (RW)
- 2024–25: Anni Pere (LW)

==== Player of the Month ====
- December 2019: Emmanuelle Passard
- October 2022: Julia Liikala
- January 2023: Emilia Vesa
- January 2024: Michaela Pejzlová
- January 2025: Pauliina Salonen
- December 2025: Emmi Juusela (F), HIFK
- January 2026: Pauliina Salonen

== Team records and leaders ==
The player records detailed here are from the Naisten Liiga (called Naisten SM-sarja from 1982 to 2017); Naisten Mestis statistics accrued during the 2018–19 season are not included. Records valid through the conclusion of the 2023–24 season.

=== Single-season records ===
- Most goals: Matilda Nilsson, 37 goals (29 games; 2021–22)
- Most assists: Michaela Pejzlová, 50 assists (31 games; 2022–23)
- Most points: Michaela Pejzlová, 82 points (31 games; 2022–23)
- Most points, defenceman: Siiri Yrjölä, 42 points (31 games; 2022–23)
- Most points, rookie: Sanni Vanhanen, 40 points (22 games; 2022–23)
- Best points per game, over ten games played: Michaela Pejzlová, 2.96 P/G (24 games; 2023–24)
- Most penalty minutes: Krista Parkkonen, 63 PIM (28 games; 2019–20)
- Best save percentage, over ten games played: Iina Kuusela, .951 SV% (18 games; 2021–22)
- Best goals against average, over ten games played: Iina Kuusela, 1.23 GAA (18 games; 2021–22)
- Most shutouts: Iina Kuusela, 6 shutouts (18 games; 2021–22)

=== Career records ===
- Most goals: Michaela Pejzlová, 94 goals (98 games; 2020–2024)
- Most assists: Michaela Pejzlová, 138 assists (98 games; 2020–2024)
- Most points: Michaela Pejzlová, 232 points (98 games; 2020–2024)
- Most points, defenceman: Siiri Yrjölä, 100 points (114 games; 2020–2024)
- Best points per game, over 30 games played: Michaela Pejzlová, 2.37 P/G (98 games; 2020–2024)
- Most penalty minutes: Two players, 94 PIM
  - Maria Novitsky (68 games; 1983–1989)
  - Clara Rozier (121 games; 2020–2024)
- Most games played, skater: Anni Pere, 138 games (2019–2024)
- Most games played, goaltender: Kiia Lahtinen, 48 games (2019–2024)
- Best save percentage: Iina Kuusela, .934 SV% (36 games; 2020–2023)
- Best goals against average: Kiia Lahtinen, 1.48 GAA (32 games; 2019–2024)
- Most shutouts: Kiia Lahtinen, 13 shutouts (48 games; 2019–2024)

=== All-time scoring leaders ===
The top Naisten Liiga regular season point scorers (goals + assists) in HIFK history, through the 2023–24 season.

Note: Nat = Nationality; Pos = Position; GP = Games played; G = Goals; A = Assists; Pts = Points; P/G = Points per game

Points
Nat	Player	Pos	GP	G	A	Pts	P/G
(Czech Republic)	Michaela Pejzlová	F	98	94	138	232	2.37
(France)	Clara Rozier	F	121	75	85	160	1.32
(Finland)	Julia Liikala	F	83	67	92	159	1.92
(France)	Emmanuelle Passard	F	85	65	55	120	1.41
(Finland)	Karoliina Rantamäki	F	104	40	76	116	1.12
(Finland)	Sanni Vanhanen	F	54	45	61	106	1.96
(Finland)	Siiri Yrjölä	D	114	27	73	100	0.88
(Finland)	Johanna Kemppainen	F	136	46	48	94	0.69
(France)	Athéna Locatelli	D	118	17	72	89	0.75
(Finland)	Arja Kaunola	F	73	59	18	77	1.05
(Finland)	Matilda Nilsson	F	29	37	18	55	1.90
(Finland)	Emilia Vesa	F	28	22	31	53	1.89
(Finland)	Krista Parkkonen	D	69	14	35	49	0.71
(Finland)	Mikaela Saukkonen	D	130	14	29	43	0.33
(Finland)	Miressa Mäkelä	F	44	18	17	35	0.80

Sources: Finnish Ice Hockey Association, Elite Prospects

== Notable alumnae ==
Seasons active with HIFK listed alongside player name.

- Sanni Ahola, 2018–2020
- Johanna Ikonen, 1988–89
- Emmi Juusela, 2019–2021 & 2024–2026
- Julia Liikala, 2021–2024
- Matilda Nilsson, 2021–22
- Krista Parkkonen, 2019–2022
- Karoliina Rantamäki, 2019–2024
- Pauliina Salonen, 2023–2026
- Liisa-Maria Sneck, 1984–1989
- Sanni Vanhanen, 2022–2024
- Emilia Vesa, 2022–23
- Siiri Yrjölä, 2020–2024

=== International players ===
- (France) Athéna Locatelli, 2020–2025
- (Czech Republic) Veronika Lorencová, 2019–2022
- (France) Emmanuelle Lahouratate Passard, 2019–2022
- (Czech Republic) Michaela Pejzlová, 2020–2024
- (France) Clara Rozier, 2020–2024
- (United States) Caroline Shaunessy, 2019–20
- (Czech Republic) Blanka Škodová, 10 August–13 October 2023
