= Naisten Mestis =

Finnish second-tier ice hockey league

- Formerly: Naisten I-divisioona
- Sport: Ice hockey
- Founded: 1985
- Founder: Finnish Ice Hockey Association
- First season: as Naisten I-divisoona, 1985–86 as Naisten Mestis, 2012–13
- Administrator: Jesse Nuutinen
- No. of teams: 8
- Country: Finland
- Most recent champion: Pelicans Lahti (2025–26)
- Broadcaster: Leijonat.tv
- Promotion to: Auroraliiga
- Relegation to: Naisten Suomi-sarja

Naisten Mestis (lit. 'Women's Championship Series'; from Mestaruussarja, 'Championship series') is the second-highest women's national ice hockey league in Finland. It was established in 1985 as the Naisten I-divisioona (lit. 'Women's First Division') by the Finnish Ice Hockey Association, when the number of teams playing in the premier national league was limited. The league was renamed Naisten Mestis prior to the 2012–13 season.

== Series format ==
The Naisten Mestis season format has changed many times since the founding of the league in 1985. The current format was first published by the Finnish Ice Hockey Association in 2022. At that time, the intent was to fully implement the format for the 2023–24 season, but adjustments have been necessary with regards to number of teams and the postseason.

=== Present format ===
Since 2023, both the Auroraliiga (called Naisten SM-sarja during 1982–2017 and Naisten Liiga during 2017–2024) and Naisten Mestis are intended to operate with ten teams and have regular seasons comprising quadruple round-robin tournament systems in which each team plays 36 games.

In the postseason, the top-two teams in the Naisten Mestis are meant to vie for promotion to the Auroraliiga in a qualification series against the lowest ranked Auroraliiga teams. Similarly, the bottom-two teams in the Naisten Mestis must defend their league places in a relegation series against the top-two teams from the Naisten Suomi-sarja.

==== 2023–24 season ====
The Finnish Ice Hockey Association intended for the Naisten Mestis to comprise ten teams in the 2023–24 season, however, operating costs led two teams – KJT Haukat and Kiilat – that qualified for the season to decline participation in the league. KJT Haukat qualified after finishing fourth in the 2022–23 Naisten Mestis regular season but the team ceased operations in May 2023, citing a lack of players willing to commit to an increased game schedule and insufficient financial resources. Kiilat Haapajärvi qualified after placing second in the 2023 Naisten Suomi-sarja final (Finnish: Naisten Suomi-sarjan lopputurnaus) but dropped out of the league due to financial concerns and instead remained in the Naisten Suomi-sarja for the 2023–24 season.

Of the eight teams that participated in the 2023–24 season, five were the akatemia teams (lit. 'academy' teams, i.e. secondary or developmental teams) of clubs playing in the Naisten Liiga. Only APV, PaRa, and SaiPa – the three teams from clubs without Naisten Liiga teams – declared their willingness to vie for promotion to the Naisten Liiga in the postseason qualification series, meaning no qualifiers would be held if at least one of those teams did not end the season ranked in the top-three of the Naisten Mestis. (Note: Under normal circumstances, the bottom-two teams from the Naisten Liiga and top-two teams from the Naisten Mestis would participate in the qualifiers. Due to the dissolution of Lukko ahead of the 2023–24 Naisten Liiga season, only nine teams played and, therefore, only one Naisten Liiga team was available to participate in the 2023 qualification series. As a result, the top-three Naisten Mestis teams were granted the opportunity to participate in the qualifiers.)

Ultimately, the akatemia teams of HIFK, Kiekko-Espoo, and KalPa finished the season at the top of league standings and no Naisten Liiga qualifiers were held in the 2024 postseason.

=== Previous formats ===
==== 2022–23 season ====
Excepting the ten teams of the Naisten Liiga, all women's ice hockey teams competing at the national level began the season in the Naisten Mestis qualifiers (Finnish: karsinta). The Naisten Mestis qualifiers, which were contested during September to December 2022, involved eighteen teams divided into three groups of five to seven teams. In the closed groups, each team played every other team at least twice. The top eight teams at the end of the qualifiers continued in the Naisten Mestis and the remaining teams filled the ranks of the Naisten Suomi-sarja.

The top-two teams from the Naisten Suomi-sarja would join the eight Naisten Mestis teams for the 2023–23 season to fill all ten available slots.

==== 2019–2022 ====
Qualifiers

With the exception of the Naisten Liiga teams, all club representative teams started the season in the Naisten Mestis Qualifiers (Finnish: Karsinta). Each team was sorted into a group (Finnish: lohko) of five to eight teams; the number of groups was determined by the total number of teams competing and each group was loosely defined by geography, with proximate teams being sorted together. Each team played a total of fifteen or sixteen matches within their division. The points earned in those games determined the team's ranking within their division; victories earned three points, overtime victories earned two points, and overtime losses earned one point. Teams that ranked forth or lower in each division at the end of the qualifiers did not qualify to play in the Naisten Mestis and continued the season in the Naisten Suomi-sarja. The qualifying round ran from the beginning of the season in September to late November or early December.

Cross qualifiers

The team with the highest point total from each division of the qualifiers moved on the cross-qualifying round (Finnish: ristiinkarsinta). If there were an odd number of divisions, the second-placed team with the highest point total of all remaining teams also moved on. The cross qualifiers were a round-robin tournament, each team faced all other participating teams once. The two teams earning the highest point totals at the end of the tournament continued their seasons in the Lower Division (Finnish: Alempi jatkosarja) of the Naisten Liiga and had the opportunity to gain promotion to the Naisten Liiga for the following season. The teams ranked third and lower in the cross qualifiers continued the season in the Naisten Mestis regular season. The cross qualifying round was played in late November and/or early December.

Regular season

The teams ranked third and lower in the cross qualifiers and the teams that finished second or third in each division of the qualifiers filled the ranks of the Naisten Mestis regular season. If the number of divisions was odd, the third ranked team from the qualifiers with the smallest point total would not qualify and moved to the Naisten Suomi-sarja so that an even number of teams was maintained in the Naisten Mestis. Each team in the regular season played an equal number of games against each of the other teams. The regular season ran from January to March.

== Teams ==
=== 2024–25 season ===
Location in Finland of teams participating in the 2024–25 Naisten Mestis season.

KeuPa HT won the qualification series against Kärpät Akatemia in the 2024 postseason to gain promotion to the Naisten Mestis for the 2024–25 season; Kärpät Akatemia was relegated to the Naisten Suomi-sarja for the 2024–25 season.

In May 2024, the women's department of Panelian Raikas (PaRa) entered into a cooperation agreement with Lukko, an ice hockey club in Rauma that had suspended the operation of its Naisten Liiga team following the 2022–23 season. The PaRa team active in the Naisten Mestis was renamed Lukko/PaRa and its sister-team in the Naisten Suomi-sarja was renamed PaRa/Lukko.

Team	Location	Home venue(s)	Head coach	Captain
APV	Alavus	Alavus Areena	Michael Ojala	Anna Räsänen
HIFK Akatemia	Helsinki	Pirkkolan jäähalli	Raido Bitter	Nathalie Karlberg & Hanna Soukko
HPK Akatemia	Hämeenlinna	Hämeenlinnan harjoitushalli, Jääliikuntakeskus Hakio	Marko Peltoniemi	Saana Haatainen
KalPa Akatemia	Kuopio	Lippumäen jäähalli	Jarno Hakkarainen	
Kiekko-Espoo Akatemia	Espoo	Tapiolan harjoitusareena	Iiro Puntari	Linda Österlund
KeuPa HT	Keuruu	Keuruun jäähalli	Lauri Saari	Iidaliina Janatuinen
Lukko/PaRa	Rauma	Eurajoen jäähalli	Jere Auvinen	Ada Ukkola
SaiPa	Lappeenranta	Kisapuisto 2	Joona Hänninen	Ella Raijas

=== Teams in previous seasons ===
The teams that participated in the Naisten Mestis regular season, listed by overall rank at the end of the season.

2017–18

1. TPS
2. Sport
3. JYP
4. RoKi
5. Hermes
6. Red Wings
7. KalPa Ak
8. Puhti

2018–19

1. HIFK
2. RoKi
3. Hermes
4. APV
5. JYP
6. Kärpät Ak

2019–20

1. JYP
2. Kärpät Ak
3. KJT Haukat
4. HIFK AK
5. SaiPa
6. YJK

2020–21

1. Kärpät Ak
2. APV
3. PaRa
4. KOOVEE
–. HIFK Ak (did not play)
–. K-Espoo Ak (did not play)

2021–22

1. HIFK Ak
2. K-Espoo Ak
3. Kärpät Ak
4. JYP
5. HPK Akatemia
6. KJT Haukat

2022–23

1. HIFK Ak
2. K-Espoo Ak
3. HPK Ak
4. KJT Haukat
5. KalPa Ak
6. APV
7. Kärpät Ak
8. SaiPa

2023–24

- 1. HIFK Ak
- 2. K-Espoo Ak
- 3. KalPa Ak
- 4. APV
- 5. HPK Ak
- 6. SaiPa
- 7. PaRa
- 8. Kärpät Ak

2024–25

- 1. K-Espoo Ak
- 2. APV
- 3. KalPa Ak
- 4. Lukko/PaRa
- 5. KeuPa HT
- 6. HPK Ak
- 7. SaiPa
- 8. HIFK Ak

== Series champions ==
The manner in which the Mestis Championship is won has changed many times since the founding of the league in 1985. It has, for example, been awarded to the most successful team in the regular season, the winner of Mestis playoffs (which have repeatedly changed format or not been held), or to the team able to win promotion through the Naisten Liiga qualification/relegation series. The winner of the Naisten Mestis has not been historically guaranteed a place in the Naisten Liiga for the following season.

- 1986: Shakers, Kerava
- 1987: Tiikerit, Hämeenlinna
- 1988: Ilves-Kiekko, Tampere
- 1989: Tiikerit, Hämeenlinna
- 1990: Espoon Kiekkoseura (EKS), Espoo
- 1991: Ketterä, Imatra
  ...
- 2001: Hämeenlinnan Pallokerho (HPK), Hämeenlinna
- 2002: Turun Palloseura (TPS), Turku
- 2003: Turun Palloseura (TPS), Turku
- 2004: Lohjan Kisa-Veikot (LoKV), Lohja
- 2005: Turun Palloseura (TPS), Turku
- 2006: Etelä-Vantaan Urheilijat (EVU), Vantaa
- 2007: Alavuden Peli-Veikot (APV), Kuortane
- 2008: Salo Hockey Team (Salo HT), Salo
- 2009: Alavuden Peli-Veikot (APV), Kuortane
- 2010: Kalevan Pallo (KalPa), Kuopio
- 2011: Itä-Helsingin Kiekko (IHT), Helsinki
- 2012: Keski-Uudenmaan Juniorikiekkoilun Tuki (KJT), Kerava
- 2013: Keski-Uudenmaan Juniorikiekkoilun Tuki (KJT), Kerava
- 2014: Rovaniemen Kiekko (RoKi), Rovaniemi
- 2015: Lapinlahden Luistin -89 Red Lights (LL-89), Lapinlahti

=== League winners, 2016–present ===
Season	(gold) First Place	(silver) Second Place	(bronze) Third Place
2015–16	Blues/EKS (Espoo)	Pelicans 2000 (Lahti)	Hermes (Kokkola)
2016–17	Sport (Vaasa)	Rovaniemen Kiekko (Rovaniemi)	Puhti (Kuusankoski)
2017–18	TPS (Turku)	Sport (Vaasa)	JYP (Jyväskylä)
2018–19	HIFK (Helsinki)	Rovaniemen Kiekko (Rovaniemi)	JYP (Jyväskylä)
2019–20	APV (Alavus)	Rovaniemen Kiekko (Rovaniemi)	JYP (Jyväskylä)
2020–21	Postseason cancelled due to COVID-19 pandemic		
2021–22	HIFK Akatemia (Helsinki)	Kiekko-Espoo Akatemia (Espoo)	Kärpät Akatemia (Oulu)
2022–23	HIFK Akatemia (Helsinki)	Kiekko-Espoo Akatemia (Espoo)	HPK Akatemia (Hämeenlinna)
2023–24	HIFK Akatemia (Helsinki)	Kiekko-Espoo Akatemia (Espoo)	KalPa Akatemia (Kuopio)
2024–25	Lukko/PaRa (Rauma)	APV (Alavus)	Kiekko-Espoo Akatemia (Espoo)
2025–26	Pelicans (Lahti)	Lukko (Rauma)	Kiekko-Espoo Akatemia (Espoo)

== See also ==
- Auroraliiga
- Women's ice hockey in Finland
