= Auroraliiga =

Finnish ice hockey league

- Upcoming season or competition: 2026–27 Auroraliiga season
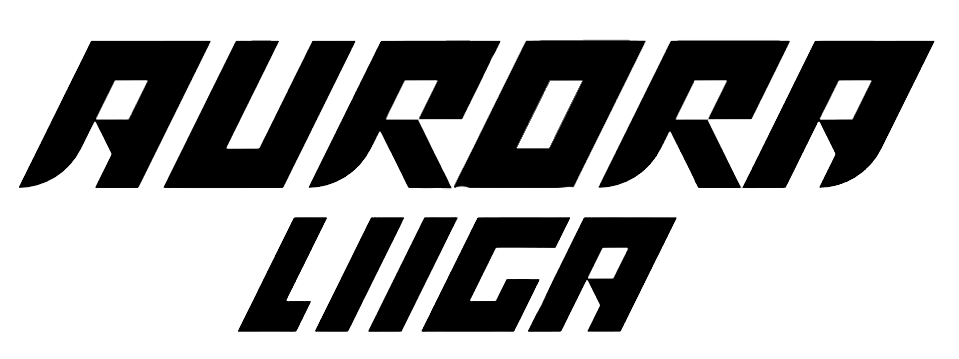
- Formerly: Naisten Liiga; 2017–2024; Naisten SM-sarja; 1982–2017
- Sport: Ice hockey
- Founded: 1982
- First season: as Naisten SM-sarja, 1982–83; as Naisten Liiga, 2017–18; as Auroraliiga, 2024–25
- Director: Henni Laaksonen
- Organising body: Finnish Ice Hockey Association
- No. of teams: 8
- Country: Finland
- Most recent champion: Kiekko-Espoo (2025–26)
- Most titles: Kiekko-Espoo (18)
- Streaming partner: Warner Bros. Discovery
- Relegation to: Naisten Mestis
- International cup: European Women's Champions Cup
- Website: auroraliiga.fi

Auroraliiga is the national championship league for women's ice hockey in Finland. Founded by the Finnish Ice Hockey Association as the Naisten SM-sarja (NSMs; lit. 'Women's Finnish Championship series') in 1982, it was known as the Naisten Liiga (NSML; lit. 'Women's League') from 2017 until being rebranded as Auroraliiga in 2024. The league comprises approximately 200 players across eight teams.

Kiekko-Espoo has been the dominating force of the Auroraliiga in the 21st century, winning eighteen Finnish Championships from 1999 to 2026. Tampereen Ilves is the second most successful club in the league's history, with ten championship titles. Ilves are the only organization to have iced a team in every season since the league's inception.

A majority of teams in Auroraliiga share their names with men's professional teams in the Liiga or Mestis – HIFK, HPK, Ilves, KalPa, Kiekko-Espoo, Kärpät, RoKi, TPS – but the women's teams have historically received few resources and limited promotion from the affiliated men's clubs. In recent years progress has been made in building better relationships between the men's and women's teams; most men's clubs now provide some support to their women's counterparts by advertising games together or helping secure sponsorships.

== Format ==
=== Season ===
The Finnish Ice Hockey Association has altered the season format of the Auroraliiga several times over the league's history. The system currently in use was introduced for the 2022–23 season. It added six games per team to the regular season schedule and matched the season structure of the league's closest neighbor, the Swedish Women's Hockey League (SDHL). The new format replaced the previous twenty-game preliminary series and ten-game divisional series structure, which was first introduced in the 2018–19 season and refined prior to the 2019–20 season.

Regular season

The regular season is a quadruple round-robin tournament, in which each team plays every other team four times – typically, a team plays every other team twice at home and twice away – resulting in a 36-game season per team. Teams are ranked by points, with three points awarded for a win in regulation time, two points for an overtime win, one point for an overtime loss, and no points awarded for a regulation loss. Individual player statistics from the regular season determine the winner of the Marianne Ihalainen Award for most points, the Tiia Reima Award for most goals scored, and the Sari Fisk Award for best plus–minus.

The top eight teams at the end of the regular season qualify for the Auroraliiga playoffs.

Playoffs

The three rounds of the Auroraliiga playoffs (Finnish: Auroraliiga pudotuspelit) are played as best-of series, with the exception of the single-elimination game for the Finnish Championship bronze medal. In the best-of-five quarterfinals, teams are paired by seeding from the regular season, with the first seed facing the eighth seed, the second seed facing the seventh seed, and so on. The semifinals and finals are best-of-seven series.

The champions of the Auroraliiga playoffs receive the Aurora Borealis Cup as league champions and gold medals as Finnish Champions in women's ice hockey. Selected by the Finnish Ice Hockey Association, the MVP of the playoffs is awarded the Karoliina Rantamäki Trophy.

Qualification

The team finishing the season in ninth place plays a promotion/relegation series (Finnish: karsintasarja, lit. 'qualifying series') against the winner of the Naisten Mestis playoffs. The winner of the series qualifies for the following Auroraliiga season and the loser is relegated to (or remains in) the Naisten Mestis for the following season.

=== Game format ===
A regulation game is sixty minutes in length, played over three 20-minute periods. In the event of a tie at the end of regulation time the winner is decided by a five-minute-length, three-skaters-per-side overtime period.

If the game remains tied after the overtime period, the teams proceed to a shootout, in which each team designates three skaters to take penalty shots, one at a time, against the opposing goaltender. Teams alternate shots and each team takes one shot per round. The winner is the team with more goals after three rounds or the team that amasses an unreachable advantage before the third round. If the shootout is tied after three rounds, tie-breaker rounds are played one at a time until there is a winner.

== Teams ==
=== 2026–27 season ===
Location in Finland of teams participating in the 2026–27 Auroraliiga season

Team	Location	Home venue	Head coach	Captain
HIFK	Helsinki	Pirkkolan jäähalli	Saara Kivenmäki	Ilona Palin
HPK	Hämeenlinna	Pihlajalinna Areena	Marko Peltoniemi	Helen Strömberg
Ilves	Tampere	Tesoman jäähalli	Marjo Voutilainen	Johanna Siira
Kiekko-Espoo	Espoo	Tapiolan harjoitusareena	Minttu Tuominen	Emmi Rakkolainen
Kärpät	Oulu	Raksilan jäähalli	Mira Kuisma	Ada Ukkola
Pelicans	Lahti	Wemasto Areena	Petteri Hirvonen	Eevi Ilvonen
Team Kuortane	Alavus	Alavus Areena	Juuso Nieminen	Erika Kankkunen
TPS	Turku	Kupittaan jäähalli	Tony Suoniemi	Peppi Kähkönen

=== Past participants ===
==== 1980s ====
- Ässät (Pori), 1982–1995
- EVU (Vantaa), 1982–1990
- Haukat (Järvenpää), 1982–83
- HJK (Helsinki), 1982–1986
- Jäähonka (Espoo), 1982–1984
- SaiPa (Lappeenranta), 1982–1992
- Shakers (Kerava), 1982–1985 & 1986–1996
- Tiikerit (Hämeenlinna), 1982–1984, 1987–88 & 1989–90
- Kiekko-Vesa (Raahe), 1983–1985
- Teräs-Kiekko (Raahe), 1983–1985
- Ilves-Kiekko (Tampere), 1984–1987 & 1988–1990
- Ketterä (Imatra), 1984–85 & 1991–1993
- StU (Savitaipale), 1984–85

==== 1990s ====
- Karhut (Joensuu)

- JoKP, 1992–1994
- Kiekko-Karhut, 1994–1997
- Karhut, 1997–98

- Tappara (Tampere), 1993–94 & 1997–2008
- JyP HT (Jyväskylä)

- JyP HT, 1989–1997
- JYP, 1997–2000

- IHK (Helsinki), 1998–2009
- K-Kissat (Helsinki), 1999–2002

==== 2000s ====
- JyHC (Jyväskylä)
  - JyHC, 1996–2004
  - Cats, 2004–2009
  - JYP, 2009–2016 & 2020–21
- KS Noux (Espoo), 2002–03
- Y-Ilves (Ylöjärvi), 2002–2004
- Team China, 2005–2007
- LoKV (Lohja), 2008–2012
- Salo HT (Salo), 2008–2013

==== 2010s & 2020s ====
- APV (Alavus), 2009–10, 2019–20 & 2021–22
- KJT (Kerava)
  - KJT, 2013–2018
  - KJT Haukat, 2018–19
- Sport (Vaasa), 2018–2022
- Lukko (Rauma), 2016–2021 & 2022–23
- RoKi (Rovaniemi), 2020–2026
- KalPa (Kuopio), 2010–2026

== Champions ==
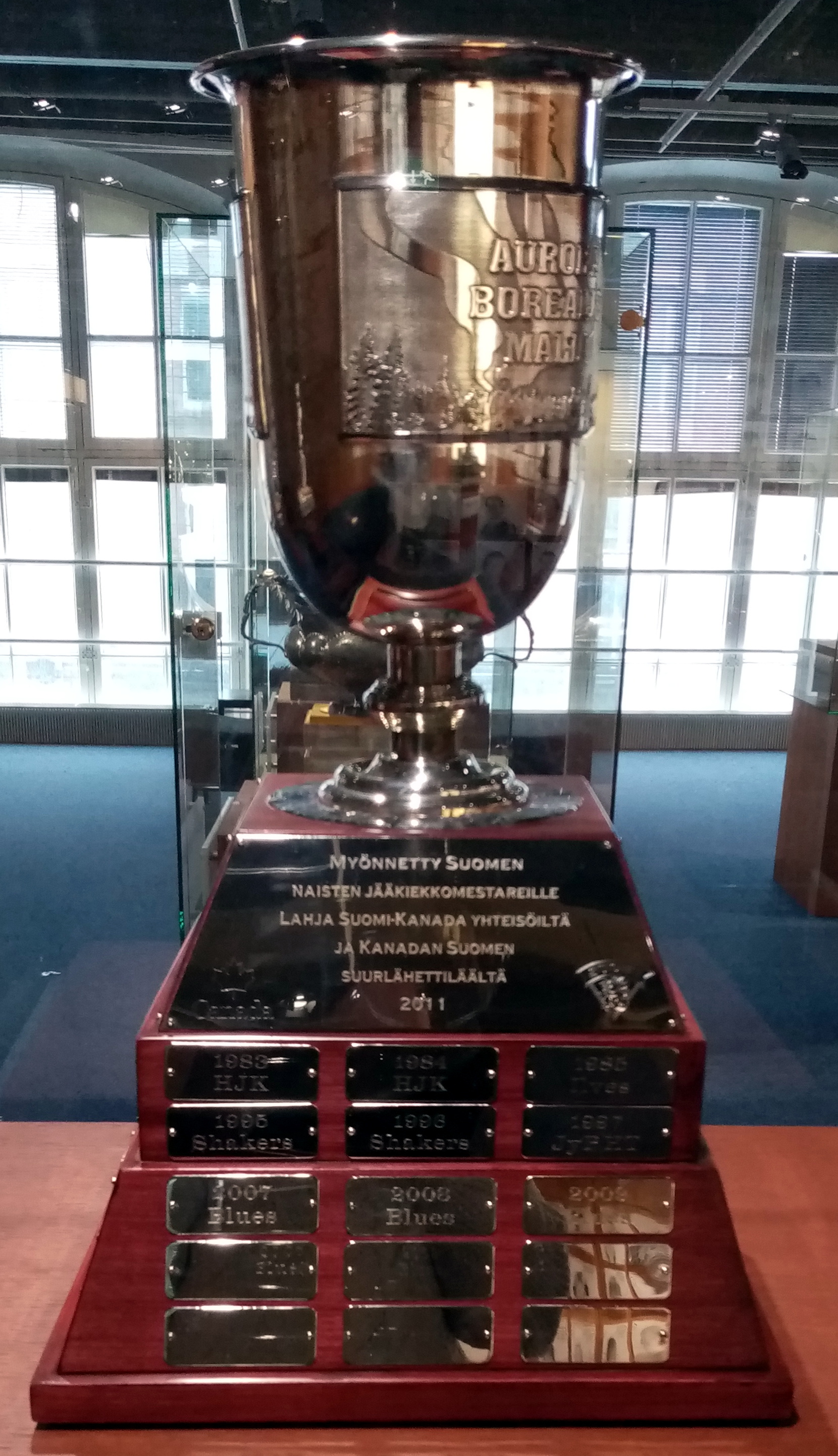
Aurora Borealis trophy

=== All-time medal count ===
– team active in the 2026–27 Auroraliiga season

Team	1st place, gold medalist(s)	2nd place, silver medalist(s)	3rd place, bronze medalist(s)
Kiekko-Espoo (Note: Includes record of Espoo Blues, Espoo United, and Espoon Kiekkoseura (EKS))	18	4	8
Ilves Tampere	10	12	8
Kärpät Oulu	3	7	8
Shakers Kerava	3	4	1
JYP Jyväskylä (Note: Includes record of JyP HT)	3	4	0
IFK Helsingfors (HIFK)	2	1	3
Helsingin Jääkiekkoklubi (HJK)	2	1	1
Etelä-Vantaan Urheilijat (EVU)	1	5	1
Hämeenlinnan Pallokerho (HPK)	1	3	4
Kalevan Pallo (KalPa)	0	1	4
Itä-Helsingin Kiekko (IHK)	0	1	1
Saimaan Pallo (SaiPa)	0	0	1
Team Kuortane	0	0	1
Sport Vaasa	0	0	1

=== Finnish Champions by season ===
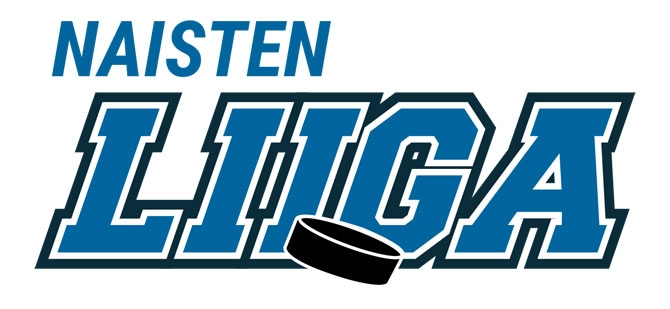
Naisten Liiga logo, 2017–2020

Naisten Liiga logo, 2020–2024

Season	(gold) Champion	(silver) Runner-up	(bronze) Third Place
Naisten SM-sarja
1982–83	HJK Helsinki	Ilves Tampere	EVU Vantaa
1983–84	HJK Helsinki	EVU Vantaa	Ilves Tampere
1984–85	Ilves Tampere	EVU Vantaa	HJK Helsinki
1985–86	Ilves Tampere	HJK Helsinki	Vaasan Sport
1986–87	Ilves Tampere	EVU Vantaa	Shakers Kerava
1987–88	Ilves Tampere	EVU Vantaa	IFK Helsinki
1988–89	EVU Vantaa	Ilves Tampere	IFK Helsinki
1989–90	Ilves Tampere	EVU Vantaa	SaiPa Lappeenranta
1990–91	Ilves Tampere	Shakers Kerava	EKS Espoo^{†}
1991–92	Ilves Tampere	Shakers Kerava	EKS Espoo^{†}
1992–93	Ilves Tampere	Shakers Kerava	Kiekko-Espoo
1993–94	Shakers Kerava	Ilves Tampere	Kiekko-Espoo
1994–95	Shakers Kerava	Ilves Tampere	KalPa Kuopio
1995–96	Shakers Kerava	Oulun Kärpät	KalPa Kuopio
1996–97	JyP HT Jyväskylä^{‡}	Shakers Kerava	Kiekko-Espoo
1997–98	JYP Jyväskylä	Kärpät Oulu	Kiekko-Espoo
1998–99	Espoo Blues^{†}	JYP Jyväskylä	Ilves Tampere
1999-2000	Espoo Blues^{†}	Kärpät Oulu	Ilves Tampere
2000–01	Espoo Blues^{†}	Kärpät Oulu	Ilves Tampere
2001–02	Espoo Blues^{†}	IHK Helsinki	Kärpät Oulu
2002–03	Espoo Blues^{†}	Kärpät Oulu	Ilves Tampere
2003–04	Espoo Blues^{†}	Ilves Tampere	Kärpät Oulu
2004–05	Espoo Blues^{†}	Ilves Tampere	Kärpät Oulu
2005–06	Ilves Tampere	Kärpät Oulu	Espoo Blues^{†}
2006–07	Espoo Blues^{†}	Kärpät Oulu	IHK Helsinki
2007–08	Espoo Blues^{†}	Ilves Tampere	Oulun Kärpät
2008–09	Espoo Blues^{†}	Ilves Tampere	HPK Hämeenlinna
2009–10	Ilves Tampere	Espoo Blues^{†}	HPK Hämeenlinna
2010–11	HPK Hämeenlinna	Ilves Tampere	Kärpät Oulu
2011–12	Kärpät Oulu	Ilves Tampere	HPK Hämeenlinna
2012–13	Espoo Blues^{†}	JYP Jyväskylä	Kärpät Oulu
2013–14	Espoo Blues^{†}	JYP Jyväskylä	HPK Hämeenlinna
2014–15	Espoo Blues^{†}	JYP Jyväskylä	Ilves Tampere
2015–16	JYP Jyväskylä	HPK Hämeenlinna	Espoo Blues^{†}
2016–17	Kärpät Oulu	Espoo United^{†}	KalPa Kuopio
Naisten Liiga
2017–18	Kärpät Oulu	Ilves Tampere	Team Kuortane
2018–19	Espoo Blues^{†}	Ilves Tampere	Kärpät Oulu
2019–20	Post-season cancelled due to COVID-19 pandemic. (Note: The 2019–20 Naisten Liiga post-season was cancelled by the Finnish Ice Hockey Association on 12 March 2020, citing public health concerns regarding the COVID-19 pandemic. The Aurora Borealis Cup Finnish Championship finals between Kiekko-Espoo and KalPa and the Finnish Championship bronze medal games between Team Kuortane and Kärpät were scheduled to begin on 14 March 2020. With the cancellation of the season, neither the Aurora Borealis Cup nor any Finnish Championship medals were awarded for the 2019–20 season.)		
2020–21	Kiekko-Espoo	KalPa Kuopio	IFK Helsinki
2021–22	Kiekko-Espoo	IFK Helsinki	Kärpät Oulu
2022–23	IFK Helsinki	Kiekko-Espoo	KalPa Kuopio
2023–24	IFK Helsinki	Kiekko-Espoo	KalPa Kuopio
Auroraliiga
2024–25	Kiekko-Espoo	HPK Hämeenlinna	Ilves Tampere
2025–26	Kiekko-Espoo	HPK Hämeenlinna	Ilves Tampere

Notes:

^{†} Included in record of Kiekko-Espoo
^{‡} Included in record of JYP Jyväskylä

== League records ==
All-time records of the Auroraliiga, from the 1982–83 season through the conclusion of the 2025–26 regular season and 2026 Aurora Borealis Cup playoffs.

=== Single-season records ===
Players appearing in ten or fewer games during a single season are not included.

- Most goals: Riikka Sallinen, 73 goals (21 games; 1993–94, Shakers)
- Most assists: Jenni Hiirikoski, 62 assists (28 games; 2015–16, JYP)
- Most points: Riikka Sallinen, 129 points (21 games; 1993–94, Shakers)
- Most points, defenseman: Jenni Hiirikoski, 79 points (29 games; 2015–16, JYP)
- Best points per game: Riikka Sallinen, 6.14 points per game (21 games; 1993–94, Shakers)
- Most penalty minutes: Jenna Grönroos, 98 PIM (15 games; 2011–12, LoKV)
- Best save percentage: Meeri Räisänen, .965 SV% (21 games; 2012–13, JYP)
- Best goals against average: Vilma Vaattovaara, 0.53 GAA (12 games; 2009–10, HPK)
- Most shutouts: Meeri Räisänen, 7 shutouts (21 games; 2012–13, JYP)

==== Single-playoff records ====
Players appearing in three or fewer games during a single playoff are not included.

- Most goals: Elisa Holopainen, 19 goals (12 games; 2022, Kiekko-Espoo)
- Most assists: Susanna Tapani, 14 assists (6 games; 2015, HPK)
- Most points: Elisa Holopainen, 29 points (12 games; 2022, Kiekko-Espoo)
- Most points, defenseman: Nelli Laitinen, 21 points (10 games; 2022, Kiekko-Espoo)
- Best points per game: Riikka Sallinen, 4.40 points per game (5 games; 1994, Shakers)
- Most penalty minutes: Marjo Voutilainen, 45 PIM (4 games; 2012, KalPa)
- Best save percentage: Noora Räty, .970 SV% (9 games; 2008, Blues)
- Best goals against average: Meeri Räisänen, 0.80 (6 games; 2016, JYP)
- Most shutouts: Two players, 5 shutouts

- Isabella Portnoj (9 games; 2013, Blues)
- Tiia Pajarinen (10 games; 2021, Kiekko-Espoo)

=== Career records ===
Players appearing in fewer than thirty regular season games during their Auroraliiga career are not included.

- Most games played, skater: Riikka Noronen, 644 games (1995–2022)
- Most goals: Karoliina Rantamäki, 414 goals (483 games; 1992–2026)
- Most assists: Riikka Noronen, 447 assists (644 games; 1995–2022)
- Most points: Karoliina Rantamäki, 805 points (483 games; 1992–2026)
- Most points, defenseman: Päivi Halonen, 495 points (408 games; 1982–2006)
- Best points per game: Michelle Karvinen, 3.667 points per game (39 games; 2007–2009)
- Most penalty minutes: Tea Villilä, 485 PIM (294 games; 2007–2025)
- Most games played, goaltender: Tiina Ranne, 245 games (2010–2026)
- Best save percentage: Johanna Oksman, .931 SV% (100 games; 2012–2022)
- Best goals against average: Kiia Lahtinen, 1.48 GAA (48 games; 2019–2024)
- Most shutouts: Tiina Ranne, 36 shutouts (228 games; 2010–2026)

==== Career playoff records ====
Players appearing in ten or fewer Finnish Championship playoff games during their career are not included.

- Most games played, skater: Saija Tarkki, 145 games (1997–2019)
- Most goals: Karoliina Rantamäki, 87 goals (142 games; 1992–2026)
- Most assists: Karoliina Rantamäki, 80 assists (142 games; 1992–2026)
- Most points: Karoliina Rantamäki, 167 points (142 games; 1992–2026)
- Most points, defenseman: Saija Tarkki, 89 points (145 games; 1997–2019)
- Best points per game: Michelle Karvinen, 2.27 points per game (15 games; 2007–2009)
- Most penalty minutes: Tea Villilä, 151 PIM (121 games; 2007–2025)
- Most games played, goaltender: Tiia Pajarinen, 74 games (2015–2026)
- Best save percentage: Kassidy Sauvé, .939 SV% (12 games; 2021–2024)
- Best goals against average: Kiia Lahtinen, 1.39 (13 games; 2020–2024)
- Most shutouts: Tiia Pajarinen, 20 shutouts (74 games; 2015–2026)

=== All-time scoring leaders ===
The top-ten regular season point-scorers in Auroraliiga history through the conclusion of 2025–26 season, inclusive of seasons during which the league was known as the Naisten SM-sarja and Naisten Liiga.

Abbreviations: Nat = Nationality; Pos = Position; GP = Games played; G = Goals; A = Assists; Pts = Points; P/G = Points per game; S = Number of seasons played; ^ = player active in 2025–26 Auroraliiga season

Nat	Player	Pos	GP	G	A	Pts	PIM	S
(Finland)	Karoliina Rantamäki^	F	483	414	391	805	136	22
(Finland)	Riikka Noronen	F	644	328	447	775	468	27
(Finland)	Linda Välimäki	F	336	360	342	702	176	17
(Finland)	Petra Vaarakallio	F	286	280	351	631	142	13
(Finland)	Tiia Reima	F	332	330	272	602	352	20
(Finland)	Marianne Ihalainen	F	323	320	282	602	152	19
(Finland)	Sari Fisk	F	401	339	253	592	158	23
(Finland)	Anne Helin	F	276	327	222	549	260	14
(Finland)	Annina Rajahuhta	F	325	239	298	537	240	15
(Finland)	Johanna Koivula	F	523	205	319	524	337	21

== See also ==
- Women's ice hockey in Finland
- Finland women's national ice hockey team
- Swedish Women's Hockey League
