= 2019 Vaahteraliiga season =

2019 Vaahteraliiga
- League: Vaahteraliiga
- Sport: American football
- Duration: 23 May–14 September 2019
- Number of teams: 7

2019
- League champions: Helsinki Roosters

Vaahteramalja
- Champions: Helsinki Roosters
- Runners-up: Kuopio Steelers

Seasons
- ← 2018 2020 →

The 2019 Vaahteraliiga season was the 40th season of the highest level of American football in Finland. The regular season took place between May 23 and August 31, 2019. Like in the last two seasons, the Helsinki Roosters finished the regular season as top ranked team. In the play-offs, the Roosters and the Kuopio Steelers qualified for the championship game Vaahteramalja LX. Contrary to the regular season, where the Steelers defeated the Roosters in both matches, the Roosters won the final quite clearly. It was the 8th consecutive championship and the 22nd total championship for the Roosters.

== Standings ==
Team	G	W	L	PF	PA	PD	PTS
Helsinki Roosters	12	10	2	533	310	+223	20
Kuopio Steelers	12	9	3	489	369	+120	18
Helsinki Wolverines	12	7	5	454	353	+101	14
Seinäjoki Crocodiles	12	6	6	429	453	−24	12
Wasa Royals	12	4	8	379	424	−45	8
Porvoo Butchers	12	4	8	334	478	−144	8
Tampere Saints	12	2	10	236	467	−231	4

== Playoffs ==
Semi-finals
1	Helsinki Roosters	35
4	Seinäjoki Crocodiles	21
2	Kuopio Steelers	21
3	Helsinki Wolverines	17

Vaahteramalja
1	Helsinki Roosters	50
2	Kuopio Steelers	6
