= 2004 Vaahteraliiga season =

The 2004 Vaahteraliiga season was the 25th season of the highest level of American football in Finland. The regular season took place between June 5 and August 23, 2004. The Finnish champion was determined in the playoffs and at the championship game Vaahteramalja XXV the Helsinki Roosters won the Turku Trojans.

== Standings ==
Team	G	W	L	PTS	PF	PA	PD
Turku Trojans	10	10	0	20	386	160	+226
Helsinki Roosters	10	9	1	18	421	102	+319
Seinäjoki Crocodiles	10	7	3	14	390	168	+222
Porvoo Butchers	10	6	4	12	169	204	-35
Lappeenranta Rajaritarit	10	4	6	8	153	262	-109
Jyväskylä Jaguaarit	10	2	8	4	134	256	-122
Pori Bears	10	2	8	4	186	406	-220
Helsinki Wolverines	10	0	10	0	112	393	-281

== Playoffs ==
Semi-finals
29 August
Turku Trojans	22
Porvoo Butchers	15
28 August
Helsinki Roosters	42
Seinäjoki Crocodiles	17

Vaahteramalja XXV
4 September
Turku Trojans	28
Helsinki Roosters	49
Third place
4 September
Seinäjoki Crocodiles	21
Porvoo Butchers	16

Relegation
Helsinki Wolverines	22
Helsinki GS Demons	45
