= 2024 Vaahteraliiga season =

The 2024 Vaahteraliiga season was the 45th season of the Vaahteraliiga, the highest level of American football in Finland. The regular season took place between May 16 and August 24, 2024. The Finnish Champion was determined in the playoffs, and at the championship game Vaahteramalja XLV the Helsinki Roosters defeated the Seinäjoki Crocodiles.

== Standings ==
Team	G	W	L	PTS	PF	PA	PD
Helsinki Roosters	12	10	2	20	455	155	+300
Kuopio Steelers	12	9	3	18	371	201	+170
Seinäjoki Crocodiles	12	8	4	16	433	264	+169
Porvoo Butchers	12	8	4	16	379	155	+224
Wasa Royals	12	4	8	8	275	364	-89
Helsinki Wolverines	12	2	10	4	176	526	–350
Lohja Crusaders	12	1	11	2	197	624	–527

== Playoffs ==
Semi-finals
1	Helsinki Roosters	41
4	Porvoo Butchers	14
2	Kuopio Steelers	14
3	Seinäjoki Crocodiles	35

Vaahteramalja XLV
1	Helsinki Roosters	49
3	Seinäjoki Crocodiles	14
