= 2014 Vaahteraliiga season =

The 2014 Vaahteraliiga season was the 35th season of the highest level of American football in Finland. The preseason took place between May 10 and May 25 and was followed by the regular season between June 16 and August 31, 2014. The Finnish champion was determined in the playoffs and at the championship game Vaahteramalja XXXV the Helsinki Roosters won the Turku Trojans.

== Standings ==
Team	G	W	L	PTS	PF	PA	PD
Helsinki Roosters	10	9	1	18	387	217	+170
Turku Trojans	10	8	2	16	406	180	+226
Seinäjoki Crocodiles	10	8	2	16	373	126	+247
Porvoo Butchers	10	5	5	10	325	297	+28
Vantaa TAFT	10	4	6	8	209	233	-24
Helsinki 69ers	10	4	6	8	293	258	+35
Helsinki Wolverines	10	2	8	4	155	544	-389
Kouvola Indians	10	0	10	0	150	443	-293

== Playoffs ==
Semi-finals
1	Helsinki Roosters	32
4	Porvoo Butchers	0
2	Turku Trojans	28
3	Seinäjoki Crocodiles	7

Vaahteramalja XXXV
1	Helsinki Roosters	21
2	Turku Trojans	7
