= 2003 Vaahteraliiga season =

The 2003 Vaahteraliiga season was the 24th season of the highest level of American football in Finland. The regular season took place between May 31 and August 11, 2003. The Finnish champion was determined in the playoffs and at the championship game Vaahteramalja XXIV the Turku Trojans won the Helsinki Roosters.

== Standings ==
Team	G	W	L	PTS	PF	PA	PD
Helsinki Roosters	10	10	0	20	527	82	+445
Turku Trojans	10	9	1	18	458	95	+363
Seinäjoki Crocodiles	10	7	3	14	284	194	+90
Porvoo Butchers	10	6	4	12	369	203	+166
Pori Bears	10	4	6	8	160	327	-167
Vaasa Vikings	10	2	8	4	119	349	-230
Jyväskylä Jaguaarit	10	2	8	4	117	368	-251
Helsinki Wolverines	10	0	10	0	72	448	-416

== Playoffs ==
Quarterfinals
4	Porvoo Butchers	64
5	Pori Bears	28
3	Seinäjoki Crocodiles	34
6	Vaasa Vikings	12

Semifinals
1	Helsinki Roosters	51
4	Porvoo Butchers	7
2	Turku Trojans	39
3	Seinäjoki Crocodiles	0

Vaahteramalja XXIV
1	Helsinki Roosters	16
2	Turku Trojans	21
Third place
3	Seinäjoki Crocodiles	21
4	Porvoo Butchers	27
