= 2016 Vaahteraliiga season =

The 2016 Vaahteraliiga season was the 37th season of the highest level of American football in Finland. The regular season took place between May 13 and August 28, 2016. The Finnish champion was determined in the playoffs, and at the championship game Vaahteramalja XXXVII the Helsinki Roosters won their fifth consecutive championship, this time against the Seinäjoki Crocodiles.

== Standings ==
Team	G	W	L	PTS	PF	PA	PD
Seinäjoki Crocodiles	12	11	1	22	425	179	+246
Helsinki Roosters	12	11	1	22	401	179	+222
Turku Trojans	12	7	5	14	397	275	+122
Wasa Royals	12	6	6	12	301	226	+75
Tampere Saints	12	4	6	8	260	493	-233
Porvoo Butchers	12	2	10	4	213	418	-205
Vantaa TAFT	12	1	12	2	167	394	-227

== Playoffs ==
Semi-finals
1	Seinäjoki Crocodiles	14
4	Wasa Royals	9
2	Helsinki Roosters	31
3	Turku Trojans	7

Vaahteramalja XXXVII
1	Seinäjoki Crocodiles	0
2	Helsinki Roosters	10
