= 2011 Vaahteraliiga season =

The 2011 Vaahteraliiga season was the 32nd season of the highest level of American football in Finland. The regular season took place between May 20 and August 7, 2011. The Finnish champion was determined in the playoffs and at the championship game Vaahteramalja XXXII the Helsinki Wolverines won the Seinäjoki Crocodiles.

== Standings ==
Team	G	W	L	PTS	PF	PA	PD
Seinäjoki Crocodiles	10	9	1	18	557	205	+352
Porvoo Butchers	10	9	1	18	385	230	+155
Helsinki Wolverines	10	7	3	14	459	222	+237
Lappeenranta Rajaritarit	10	7	3	14	460	310	+150
Jyväskylä Jaguaarit	10	4	6	8	247	349	-102
Oulu Northern Lights	10	3	7	6	259	409	-150
Helsinki Roosters	10	1	9	2	185	432	-247
Turku Trojans	10	0	10	0	90	485	-395

== Playoffs ==
Semi-finals
1	Seinäjoki Crocodiles	38
4	Lappeenranta Rajaritarit	28
2	Porvoo Butchers	36
3	Helsinki Wolverines	50

Vaahteramalja XXXII
1	Seinäjoki Crocodiles	27
3	Helsinki Wolverines	30
