= 2009 Vaahteraliiga season =

The 2009 Vaahteraliiga season was the 30th season of the highest level of American football in Finland. The regular season took place between May 30 and August 15, 2009. The Finnish champion was determined in the playoffs and at the championship game Vaahteramalja XXX the Porvoo Butchers won the Helsinki Roosters.

== Standings ==
Team	G	W	L	PTS	PF	PA	PD
Porvoo Butchers	10	9	1	18	399	151	+248
Helsinki Roosters	10	8	2	16	422	280	+142
Seinäjoki Crocodiles	10	7	3	14	362	187	+175
Lappeenranta Rajaritarit	10	5	5	10	232	331	-99
Jyväskylä Jaguaarit	10	5	5	10	314	316	-2
Helsinki Wolverines	10	3	7	6	336	347	-11
Tampere Saints	10	2	8	4	169	334	-165
Turku Trojans	10	1	9	2	88	376	-288

== Playoffs ==
Semi-finals
1	Porvoo Butchers	28
4	Lappeenranta Rajaritarit	3
2	Helsinki Roosters	36
3	Seinäjoki Crocodiles	33

Vaahteramalja XXX
1	Porvoo Butchers	47
2	Helsinki Roosters	16
