= 2022 Vaahteraliiga season =

Sports season

The 2022 Vaahteraliiga season was the 43rd season of the Vaahteraliiga, the highest level of American football in Finland. The regular season took place between May 15 and September 3, 2022. The Finnish Champion was determined in the playoffs, and at the championship game Vaahteramalja XLIII the Kuopio Steelers defeated the Seinäjoki Crocodiles. It was the Steelers' third straight championship title.

== Standings ==
Team	G	W	L	PTS	PF	PA	PD
Kuopio Steelers	12	12	0	24	552	146	+406
Helsinki Wolverines	12	8	4	16	413	198	+215
Seinäjoki Crocodiles	12	8	4	16	379	226	+153
Helsinki Roosters	12	8	4	16	363	251	+112
Porvoo Butchers	12	4	8	8	312	394	–82
UNC Crusaders	12	2	10	4	205	517	–312
Kotka Eagles	12	0	12	0	95	587	–492

== Playoffs ==
Semi-finals
1	Kuopio Steelers	28
4	Helsinki Roosters	0
2	Helsinki Wolverines	21
3	Seinäjoki Crocodiles	28

Vaahteramalja XLIII
1	Kuopio Steelers	21
3	Seinäjoki Crocodiles	14
