= 2021 Vaahteraliiga season =

The 2021 Vaahteraliiga season was the 42nd season of the Vaahteraliiga, the highest level of American football in Finland. The regular season took place between July 26 and September 4, 2021. The Finnish Champion was determined in the playoffs, and at the championship game Vaahteramalja XLII the Kuopio Steelers defeated the Helsinki Roosters. It was the Steelers' second straight championship title.

== Standings ==
Team	G	W	L	PTS	PF	PA	PD
Kuopio Steelers	8	7	1	14	333	143	+190
Helsinki Roosters	8	6	2	12	290	164	+126
Porvoo Butchers	8	5	3	10	213	218	-5
Seinäjoki Crocodiles	8	4	4	8	208	191	+17
Helsinki Wolverines	8	3	5	6	122	211	-89
UNC Crusaders	8	2	6	4	184	258	-74
Wasa Royals	8	1	7	2	96	261	-165

== Playoffs ==
Semi-finals
1	Kuopio Steelers	52
4	Seinäjoki Crocodiles	14
2	Helsinki Roosters	49
3	Porvoo Butchers	7

Vaahteramalja XLII
1	Kuopio Steelers	14
2	Helsinki Roosters	0
