= 1999 Vaahteraliiga season =

The 1999 Vaahteraliiga season was the 20th season of the highest level of American football in Finland. The regular season took place between June 5 and August 15, 1999. The Finnish champion was determined in the playoffs and at the championship game Vaahteramalja XX, in which the Helsinki Roosters won the Turku Trojans.

The Lappeenranta Rajaritarit forfeited just before the season, which is the reason for an unequal number of games in the regular season.

== Standings ==
Team	G	W	L	PTS	PF	PA	PD
Helsinki Roosters	9	9	0	18	511	44	+467
Rovaniemi ACS	8	6	2	12	187	122	+65
Turku Trojans	8	6	2	12	196	116	+80
Seinäjoki Crocodiles	9	5	4	10	227	163	+64
Porvoo Butchers	9	2	7	4	131	333	−202
Helsinki ECG	8	1	7	2	104	328	−224
Oulu Northern Lights	9	1	8	2	73	323	−250

== Playoffs ==
Semi-finals
21 September
Helsinki Roosters	35
Seinäjoki Crocodiles	0
21 September
Rovaniemi ACS	28
Turku Trojans	40

Vaahteramalja XX
28 September
Helsinki Roosters	35
Turku Trojans	14
Third place
27 September
Rovaniemi ACS	41
Seinäjoki Crocodiles	27

Relegation
Oulu Northern Lights	49
Helsinki Wolverines	6
