= 2025 Vaahteraliiga season =

The 2025 Vaahteraliiga season was the 46th season of the Vaahteraliiga, the highest level of American football in Finland. The regular season took place between May 5 and August 30, 2025. The Finnish Champion was determined in the playoffs, and at the championship game Vaahteramalja XLVI the Porvoo Butchers defeated the Seinäjoki Crocodiles. It was the fourth consecutive defeat in the championship game for the Crocodiles.

== Standings ==
Team	G	W	L	PTS	PF	PA	PD
Porvoo Butchers	10	10	0	20	442	168	+274
Kuopio Steelers	10	7	3	14	367	143	+224
Seinäjoki Crocodiles	10	7	3	14	233	155	+78
Helsinki Roosters	10	6	4	12	299	131	+168
Wasa Royals	10	5	5	10	152	204	-52
East City Giants	10	2	8	4	132	387	-255
Tampere Saints	10	2	8	4	131	328	-197
Helsinki Wolverines	10	1	9	2	111	351	-240

== Playoffs ==
Semi-finals
1	Porvoo Butchers	44
4	Helsinki Roosters	14
2	Kuopio Steelers	28
3	Seinäjoki Crocodiles	31

Vaahteramalja XLVI
1	Porvoo Butchers	52
3	Seinäjoki Crocodiles	21
