= 2002 Vaahteraliiga season =

The 2002 Vaahteraliiga season was the 23rd season of the highest level of American football in Finland. The regular season took place between June 1 and August 12, 2002. The Finnish champion was determined in the playoffs and at the championship game Vaahteramalja XXIII the Helsinki Roosters won the Turku Trojans.

== Standings ==
Team	G	W	L	PTS	PF	PA	PD
Helsinki Roosters	8	8	0	16	367	78	+289
Seinäjoki Crocodiles	8	7	1	14	322	78	+244
Turku Trojans	8	6	2	12	306	119	+187
Jyväskylä Jaguaarit	8	5	3	10	268	101	+167
Porvoo Butchers	8	4	4	8	216	208	+8
Vaasa Vikings	8	2	6	4	109	193	-184
Helsinki Wolverines	8	2	6	4	138	290	-152
Oulu Northern Lights	8	1	7	2	35	315	-280
Varkaus Steelers	8	1	7	2	50	329	-279

== Playoffs ==
Quarterfinals
4	Jyväskylä Jaguaarit	37
5	Porvoo Butchers	17
3	Turku Trojans	76
6	Vaasa Vikings	14

Semifinals
1	Helsinki Roosters	43
4	Jyväskylä Jaguaarit	0
2	Seinäjoki Crocodiles	0
3	Turku Trojans	28

Vaahteramalja XXIII
1	Helsinki Roosters	44
3	Turku Trojans	20
Third place
2	Seinäjoki Crocodiles	3
4	Jyväskylä Jaguaarit	0
