= Sport in Helsinki =

Sport in the capital of Finland

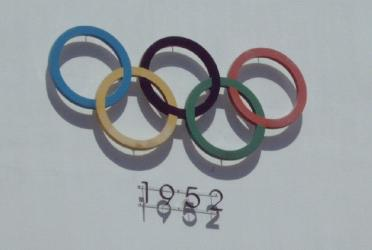
Olympic rings at the Helsinki Olympic Stadium

Helsinki has a long tradition in sports. The city gained much of its initial international recognition during the 1952 Summer Olympics, and the city has since then been very open to arranging sporting events. The Olympic Stadium is also home to the Sports Museum of Finland. Helsinki hosts successful local teams in both of the most popular team-sports in Finland, football and ice hockey. The latter being a sport of passion for many Helsinkians, who usually take a stance for either of the local clubs HIFK or Jokerit. The strong culture of ice hockey has led to Helsinki becoming the birthplace of many legendary National Hockey League stars such as Teemu Selänne, Jari Kurri and Esa Tikkanen. American football has a strong tradition in Helsinki.

Although not as popular, rugby union is also played in the Finnish capital, which is represented by the Helsinki RC and Helsinki Warriors RC.

== Olympics and other sporting events ==
Helsinki was elected host-city of the 1940 Summer Olympics, but due to World War II they were canceled. Instead Helsinki was the host of the 1952 Summer Olympics. The Olympics were a landmark event symbolically and economically for Helsinki and Finland as a whole that was recovering from the Winter War and the Continuation War fought with the Soviet Union.

Helsinki was also in 1983 the first ever city to host the World Championships in Athletics. Helsinki also hosted the event in 2005, thus also becoming the first city to ever host the Championships for a second time.

The city hosted the final stages of the 1967 EuroBasket and was chosen as one of the co-hosts for the 2017 EuroBasket.

The Helsinki City Marathon has been held in the city every year since 1980, usually in August.

Naisten kymppi is an annual running or walking event for women, held in Helsinki at the end of May.

A Formula 3000 race through the city streets was held on May 25, 1997.

In 2009 Helsinki was host of European Figure Skating Championships.

== Popular local teams ==
Club	Main sport	League	Venue
HIFK	Ice hockey	SM-liiga	Helsinki Ice Hall
Jokerit	Ice hockey	Mestis	Helsinki Ice Hall
HJK	Football	Veikkausliiga, Kansallinen Liiga	Bolt Arena
Torpan Pojat	Basketball	Naisten Korisliiga	Töölö Sports Hall
Helsinki Seagulls	Basketball	Korisliiga	Töölö Sports Hall
Tapanilan Erä	Floorball	Salibandyliiga, Naisten Salibandyliiga	Mosahalli
Helsinki Wolverines	American football	Vaahteraliiga	Helsinki Velodrome
Helsinki Roosters	American football	Vaahteraliiga	Helsinki Velodrome
Helsinki 69ers	American football	Vaahteraliiga	Helsinki Velodrome
HIFK Bandy	Bandy	Bandyliiga	Kallio Ice Rink
Botnia-69	Bandy	Bandyliiga	Oulunkylä Ice Rink
