= 2008 Vaahteraliiga season =

The 2008 Vaahteraliiga season was the 29th season of the highest level of American football in Finland. The regular season took place between May 24 and August 30, 2008. The Finnish champion was determined in the playoffs and at the championship game Vaahteramalja XXIX the Porvoo Butchers won the Helsinki Roosters.

== Standings ==
Team	G	W	L	PTS	PF	PA	PD
Porvoo Butchers	12	9	3	18	494	291	+203
Helsinki Roosters	12	8	4	16	524	533	-9
Jyväskylä Jaguaarit	12	8	4	16	563	455	+108
Helsinki Wolverines	12	7	5	14	461	433	+28
Seinäjoki Crocodiles	12	6	6	12	336	386	-50
Turku Trojans	12	4	8	8	396	364	-58
Tampere Saints	12	0	12	0	429	651	-222

== Playoffs ==
Semi-finals
1	Porvoo Butchers	31
4	Helsinki Wolverines	6
2	Helsinki Roosters	53
3	Jyväskylä Jaguaarit	50

Vaahteramalja XXIX
1	Porvoo Butchers	47
2	Helsinki Roosters	41
