= 2010 Vaahteraliiga season =

The 31st season of the Vaahteraliiga, the highest level of American football in Finland, was played in 2010. The regular season took place between May 21 and August 22, 2010. The Finnish champion was determined in the playoffs and at the championship game Vaahteramalja XXXI the Porvoo Butchers won the Seinäjoki Crocodiles.

== Standings ==
Team	G	W	L	PTS	PF	PA	PD
Seinäjoki Crocodiles	10	8	2	16	379	191	+188
Helsinki Wolverines	10	8	2	16	407	266	+141
Porvoo Butchers	10	8	2	16	351	190	+161
Helsinki Roosters	10	7	3	14	323	228	+95
Lappeenranta Rajaritarit	10	4	6	8	381	309	+72
Jyväskylä Jaguaarit	10	3	7	6	187	381	-194
Turku Trojans	10	2	8	4	134	324	-190
Tampere Saints	10	0	10	0	164	437	-273

== Playoffs ==
Semi-finals
1	Seinäjoki Crocodiles	42
4	Helsinki Roosters	28
2	Helsinki Wolverines	27
3	Porvoo Butchers	41

Vaahteramalja XXXII
1	Seinäjoki Crocodiles	17
3	Porvoo Butchers	30
