= 2001 Vaahteraliiga season =

Finnish American football league season

The 2001 Vaahteraliiga season was the 22nd season of the highest level of American football in Finland. The regular season took place between May 26 and August 5, 2001. The Finnish champion was determined in the playoffs and at the championship game Vaahteramalja XXII the Seinäjoki Crocodiles won the Helsinki Roosters.

== Standings ==
Team	G	W	L	PTS	PF	PA	PD
Helsinki Roosters	8	8	0	16	383	76	+307
Seinäjoki Crocodiles	8	7	1	14	294	101	+193
Turku Trojans	8	5	3	10	232	174	+58
Helsinki ECG	8	4	4	8	192	189	+3
Helsinki Wolverines	8	4	4	8	165	204	-39
Oulu Northern Lights	8	3	5	6	131	210	-79
Jyväskylä Jaguaarit	8	2	6	4	129	235	-106
Varkaus Steelers	8	2	6	4	102	220	-118
Vaasa Vikings	8	1	7	2	66	285	-219

== Playoffs ==
Quarterfinals
4	Helsinki ECG	42
5	Helsinki Wolverines	0
3	Turku Trojans	30
6	Oulu Northern Lights	9

Semifinals
1	Helsinki Roosters	45
4	Helsinki ECG	0
2	Seinäjoki Crocodiles	29
3	Turku Trojans	7

Vaahteramalja XXII
1	Helsinki Roosters	13
2	Seinäjoki Crocodiles	15
Third place
3	Turku Trojans	48
4	Helsinki ECG	6
