= 2005 Vaahteraliiga season =

The 2005 Vaahteraliiga season was the 26th season of the highest level of American football in Finland. The regular season took place between June 4 and August 28, 2005. The Finnish champion was determined in the playoffs and at the championship game Vaahteramalja XXVI the Porvoo Butchers won the Seinäjoki Crocodiles.

== Standings ==
Team	G	W	L	PTS	PF	PA	PD
Seinäjoki Crocodiles	10	10	0	20	341	70	+271
Porvoo Butchers	10	8	2	16	405	112	+293
Helsinki Roosters	10	6	4	12	255	131	+124
Turku Trojans	10	6	4	12	286	241	+45
Helsinki Wolverines	10	5	5	10	238	203	+35
Sea City Storm	10	2	8	4	162	441	-279
Lappeenranta Rajaritarit	10	2	8	4	105	307	-202
Jyväskylä Jaguaarit	10	1	9	2	62	349	-287

== Playoffs ==
Semi-finals
3 September
Seinäjoki Crocodiles	51
Turku Trojans	12
3 September
Porvoo Butchers	24
Helsinki Roosters	0

Vaahteramalja XXVI
10 September
Seinäjoki Crocodiles	7
Porvoo Butchers	17
Third place
10 September
Helsinki Roosters	30
Turku Trojans	13

Last place
7	Lappeenranta Rajaritarit	W.O.
8	Jyväskylä Jaguaarit	-

Relegation
Jyväskylä Jaguaarit	0
Helsinki GS Demons	14
