= 2015 Vaahteraliiga season =

The 2015 Vaahteraliiga season was the 36th season of the highest level of American football in Finland. The regular season took place between June 11 and August 31, 2015. The Finnish champion was determined in the playoffs, and at the championship game Vaahteramalja XXXVI the Helsinki Roosters won fourth consecutive championship, this time against the Seinäjoki Crocodiles.

== Standings ==
Team	G	W	L	PTS	PF	PA	PD
Seinäjoki Crocodiles	10	8	2	16	326	154	+172
Turku Trojans	10	7	3	14	383	206	+177
Helsinki Roosters	10	7	3	14	326	227	+99
Helsinki 69ers	10	4	6	8	225	287	-62
Porvoo Butchers	10	4	6	8	235	279	-44
Vantaa TAFT	10	0	10	0	80	422	-342

== Playoffs ==
Semi-finals
1	Seinäjoki Crocodiles	28
4	Helsinki 69ers	7
2	Turku Trojans	10
3	Helsinki Roosters	33

Vaahteramalja XXXVI
1	Seinäjoki Crocodiles	31
3	Helsinki Roosters	45
