= 2012 Vaahteraliiga season =

The 2012 Vaahteraliiga season was the 33rd season of the highest level of American football in Finland. The regular season took place between May 26 and August 13, 2012. The Finnish champion was determined in the playoffs and at the championship game Vaahteramalja XXXIII the Helsinki Roosters won the Helsinki Wolverines.

== Standings ==
Team	G	W	L	PTS	PF	PA	PD
Helsinki Wolverines	10	9	1	18	485	157	+301
Seinäjoki Crocodiles	10	9	1	18	384	174	+210
Helsinki Roosters	10	7	3	14	348	183	+165
Porvoo Butchers	10	5	5	10	210	236	-26
Jyväskylä Jaguaarit	10	4	6	8	145	202	-57
Vantaa TAFT	10	3	7	6	162	187	-25
Oulu Northern Lights	10	2	8	4	102	338	-236
Turku Trojans	10	1	9	2	34	366	-332

== Playoffs ==
Semi-finals
1	Helsinki Wolverines	35
4	Porvoo Butchers	16
2	Seinäjoki Crocodiles	21
3	Helsinki Roosters	41

Vaahteramalja XXXIII
1	Helsinki Wolverines	17
3	Helsinki Roosters	20
