= 2007 Vaahteraliiga season =

American-football season in Finland

The 2007 Vaahteraliiga season was the 28th season of the highest level of American football in Finland. The regular season took place between June 3 and August 26, 2007. The Finnish champion was determined in the playoffs and at the championship game Vaahteramalja XXVIII the Porvoo Butchers won the Seinäjoki Crocodiles.

== Standings ==
Team	G	W	L	PTS	PF	PA	PD
Porvoo Butchers	10	8	2	16	284	135	+149
Seinäjoki Crocodiles	10	8	2	16	269	85	+184
Jyväskylä Jaguaarit	10	7	3	14	274	165	+109
Helsinki Wolverines	10	6	4	12	227	102	+125
Helsinki Roosters	10	5	5	10	199	215	-16
Turku Trojans	10	4	6	8	149	223	-74
Lappeenranta Rajaritarit	10	2	8	4	73	298	-225
Sea City Storm	10	0	10	0	126	378	-252

== Playoffs ==
Semi-finals
1	Porvoo Butchers	14
4	Helsinki Wolverines	7
2	Seinäjoki Crocodiles	40
3	Jyväskylä Jaguaarit	27

Vaahteramalja XXVIII
1	Porvoo Butchers	15
2	Seinäjoki Crocodiles	14
