= 2013 Vaahteraliiga season =

The 2013 Vaahteraliiga season was the 34th season of the highest level of American football in Finland. The regular season took place between May 19 and August 18, 2013. The Finnish champion was determined in the playoffs and at the championship game Vaahteramalja XXXIV the Helsinki Roosters won the Helsinki Wolverines.

== Standings ==
| Team | G | W | L | PTS | PF | PA | PD |
|---|---|---|---|---|---|---|---|
| Helsinki Roosters | 10 | 10 | 0 | 20 | 465 | 182 | +283 |
| Seinäjoki Crocodiles | 10 | 7 | 3 | 14 | 349 | 266 | +83 |
| Helsinki Wolverines | 10 | 7 | 3 | 14 | 349 | 223 | +126 |
| Vantaa TAFT | 10 | 6 | 4 | 12 | 329 | 266 | +63 |
| Porvoo Butchers | 10 | 5 | 5 | 10 | 282 | 286 | -4 |
| Kouvola Indians | 10 | 3 | 7 | 6 | 221 | 412 | -191 |
| Helsinki 69ers | 10 | 1 | 9 | 2 | 150 | 349 | -199 |
| Jyväskylä Jaguaarit | 10 | 1 | 9 | 2 | 210 | 371 | -161 |

== Playoffs ==
Semi-finals
1 | Helsinki Roosters | 63
4 | Vantaa TAFT | 28
2 | Seinäjoki Crocodiles | 41
3 | Helsinki Wolverines | 49

Vaahteramalja XXXIV
1 | Helsinki Roosters | 52
3 | Helsinki Wolverines | 31
