= 2006 Vaahteraliiga season =

The 2006 Vaahteraliiga season was the 27th season of the highest level of American football in Finland. The regular season took place between May 36 and September 9, 2006. The Finnish champion was determined in the playoffs and at the championship game Vaahteramalja XXVII the Porvoo Butchers won the Helsinki Wolverines.

== Standings ==
Team	G	W	L	PTS	PF	PA	PD
Seinäjoki Crocodiles	12	11	1	22	464	74	+390
Porvoo Butchers	12	10	2	20	518	157	+361
Helsinki Roosters	12	8	4	16	306	332	-26
Helsinki Wolverines	12	7	5	14	344	293	+51
Turku Trojans	12	3	9	6	341	351	-10
Lappeenranta Rajaritarit	12	3	9	6	306	372	-66
Sea City Storm	12	0	12	0	32	732	-700

== Playoffs ==
Semi-finals
1	Seinäjoki Crocodiles	7
4	Helsinki Wolverines	12
2	Porvoo Butchers	45
3	Helsinki Roosters	27

Vaahteramalja XXVII
2	Porvoo Butchers	41
4	Helsinki Wolverines	22
