= 2017 Vaahteraliiga season =

The 2017 Vaahteraliiga season was the 38th season of the highest level of American football in Finland. The regular season took place between May 6 and August 27, 2017. The Finnish champion was determined in the playoffs, and at the championship game Vaahteramalja XXXVIII the Helsinki Roosters won their sixth consecutive championship, this time against the Wasa Royals.

== Standings ==
Team	G	W	L	PTS	PF	PA	PD
Helsinki Roosters	12	11	1	22	465	163	+302
Wasa Royals	12	9	3	18	363	196	+167
Hämeenlinna Huskies	12	8	4	16	352	203	+149
Porvoo Butchers	12	6	6	12	321	263	+58
Turku Trojans	12	3	9	6	155	320	-165
Tampere Saints	12	3	9	6	217	437	-220
Seinäjoki Crocodiles	12	2	10	2	150	441	-291

== Playoffs ==
Semi-finals
1	Helsinki Roosters	41
4	Porvoo Butchers	13
2	Wasa Royals	17
3	Hämeenlinna Huskies	14

Vaahteramalja XXXVIII
1	Helsinki Roosters	37
2	Wasa Royals	9
