= 2020 Vaahteraliiga season =

The 2020 Vaahteraliiga season was the 41st season of the Vaahteraliiga, the highest level of American football in Finland. The regular season took place between July 30 and August 29, 2020. After eight consecutive titles, the Roosters failed to enter the playoffs. The Finnish Champion was determined in the playoffs, and at the championship game Vaahteramalja XLI the Kuopio Steelers defeated the Helsinki Wolverines. It was the Steelers' first championship title.

== Standings ==
Team	G	W	L	PTS	PF	PA	PD
Kuopio Steelers	5	4	1	8	223	105	+118
Wasa Royals	5	3	2	6	160	190	-30
Helsinki Wolverines	5	3	2	6	136	161	-25
Seinäjoki Crocodiles	5	3	2	6	137	99	+38
Helsinki Roosters	5	2	3	4	176	134	+42
Porvoo Butchers	5	0	5	0	87	230	-143

== Playoffs ==
Semi-finals
1	Kuopio Steelers	35
4	Seinäjoki Crocodiles	13
2	Wasa Royals	41
3	Helsinki Wolverines	42

Vaahteramalja XLI
1	Kuopio Steelers	21
3	Helsinki Wolverines	0
