= 2018 Vaahteraliiga season =

Highest level of American football in Finland

The 2018 Vaahteraliiga season was the 39th season of the highest level of American football in Finland. The regular season took place between May 10 and September 9, 2018. The Finnish champion was determined in the playoffs, and at the championship game Vaahteramalja XXXIX the Helsinki Roosters won a league record seventh consecutive championship, this time against the Kuopio Steelers.

== Standings ==
Team	G	W	L	PTS	PF	PA	PD
Helsinki Roosters	10	10	0	20	526	166	+360
Kuopio Steelers	10	8	2	16	404	315	+89
Wasa Royals	10	4	6	8	202	265	-63
Porvoo Butchers	10	3	7	6	181	281	-100
Seinäjoki Crocodiles	10	3	7	6	213	413	-200
Tampere Saints	10	2	8	4	240	326	-86

== Playoffs ==
Semi-finals
1	Helsinki Roosters	47
4	Porvoo Butchers	7
2	Kuopio Steelers	34
3	Wasa Royals	26

Vaahteramalja XXXIX
1	Helsinki Roosters	44
2	Kuopio Steelers	14
