= 2023 Vaahteraliiga season =

The 2023 Vaahteraliiga season was the 44th season of the Vaahteraliiga, the highest level of American football in Finland. The regular season took place between May 11 and August 26, 2023. The Finnish Champion was determined in the playoffs, and at the championship game Vaahteramalja XLIV the Porvoo Butchers defeated the Seinäjoki Crocodiles.

== Standings ==
Team	G	W	L	PTS	PF	PA	PD
Seinäjoki Crocodiles	12	10	2	20	421	227	+194
Porvoo Butchers	12	8	4	16	411	297	+114
Helsinki Roosters	12	7	5	14	436	260	+176
Wasa Royals	12	6	6	12	369	329	+40
Kuopio Steelers	12	6	6	12	315	265	+50
UNC Crusaders	12	4	8	8	359	412	–53
Helsinki Wolverines	12	0	12	0	66	638	–572

== Playoffs ==
Semi-finals
1	Seinäjoki Crocodiles	28
4	Wasa Royals	14
2	Porvoo Butchers	24
3	Helsinki Roosters	14

Vaahteramalja XLIV
1	Seinäjoki Crocodiles	7
2	Porvoo Butchers	27
