= 2000 Vaahteraliiga season =

The 2000 Vaahteraliiga season was the 21st season of the highest level of American football in Finland. The regular season took place between May 20 and July 9, 2000 and the qualification round took place between July 22 and August 27, 2000. The two best teams of the round met at the championship game Vaahteramalja XXI, in which the Helsinki Roosters won the Seinäjoki Crocodiles.

== Regular season ==
Team	G	W	L	PTS	PF	PA	PD
Helsinki Roosters	6	5	1	10	235	57	+178
Jyväskylä Jaguaarit	6	4	2	8	115	175	-60
Turku Trojans	6	3	3	6	135	114	+21
Seinäjoki Crocodiles	6	3	3	6	165	168	-3
Rovaniemi ACS	6	2	4	4	93	130	-37
Helsinki ECG	6	2	4	4	138	99	+39
Oulu Northern Lights	6	1	5	2	49	247	-198

== Qualification round ==
Team	G	W	L	PTS	PF	PA	PD
Helsinki Roosters	5	5	0	15	214	28	+186
Seinäjoki Crocodiles	5	4	1	11	167	112	+55
Turku Trojans	5	3	2	9	132	77	+55
Jyväskylä Jaguaarit	5	1	4	6	61	167	−106
Rovaniemi ACS	5	1	4	5	72	156	−84
Helsinki ECG	5	1	4	4	77	183	−106

== Playoffs ==
Bronze medal game
Turku Trojans	37
Jyväskylä Jaguaarit	12

Vaahteramalja XXI
Helsinki Roosters	25
Seinäjoki Crocodiles	17
