= Robert Johnson (wide receiver) =

American football player (born 1982)

Helsinki Wolverines
- Position: Quarterback / Wide receiver

Personal information
- Born: June 20, 1982 (age 44); Americus, Georgia, U.S.
- Listed height: 6 ft 1 in (1.85 m)
- Listed weight: 218 lb (99 kg)

Career information
- High school: Americus (GA)
- College: Texas Tech
- NFL draft: 2007: undrafted

Career history
- (Finland) Porvoo Butchers (2007); (Finland) Helsinki Roosters (2008–2009); Arkansas Twisters (2009); (Finland) Porvoo Butchers (2010); (Italy) Catania Elephants (2011); (Finland) Kouvola Indians (2011); (Finland) Helsinki Roosters (2012–2014); (Finland) Turku Trojans (2015); (Finland) Helsinki Wolverines (2017–2019); (Finland) United Newland Crusaders (2020–2021)

Awards and highlights
- Second-team All-Big 12 (2005)

Robert Johnson (born June 20, 1982) is an American football player, notable for his professional career in the Finnish league Vaahteraliiga. Johnson played his college career at Texas Tech and he signed overseas Finland in 2007. He is currently an assistant coach for the United Newland Crusaders in Finland. Johnson has also played in the Italian Football League.

== College career ==
Johnson was born in Americus, Georgia, and graduated from Americus High School. He attended the Reedley College and was ranked as the number one junior college QB in the country before he attended Texas Tech University. Johnson redshirted his first year and played wide receiver for the Texas Tech Red Raiders football team 2005 and 2006. In 2005, he was awarded with the 2005 Big 12 Conference Offensive Newcomer of the Year. He had 156 receptions for 1822 and 15 touchdowns in two seasons. Johnson lead the Big 12 conference in receptions in 2006 earning all conference honors. Johnson entered to Texas Tech as a quarterback but changed position to wide receiver.

Pre-draft measurables
Height	Weight	40-yard dash	10-yard split	20-yard split	20-yard shuttle	Three-cone drill	Vertical jump	Broad jump
6 ft 1 in (1.85 m)	215 lb (98 kg)	4.74 s	1.63 s	2.70 s	4.43 s	7.46 s	29 in (0.74 m)	8 ft 7 in (2.62 m)
Measurements were taken at the Texas Tech Pro Day.

== Professional career ==
Johnson was eligible in 2007 NFL draft but he wasn't drafted. He went to Europe and signed with the Porvoo Butchers in 2007. Johnson changed his role back to quarterback and he led his team to the Finnish Championship. Next year Johnson signed with the Helsinki Roosters and during the season he broke the league record of most passing touchdowns in one season. Johnson played with the Roosters 2008 and 2009. In between of the seasons Johnson was part of the Arkansas Twister in the af2 during the preseason.

Johnson joined the Butchers again in 2010 and won the Finnish Championship. Johnson went to Italy for 2011 season. He played for the Catania Elephants and led the team to the semifinals. After the season in Italy was over, Johnson joined the Kouvola Indians for the remainder of the season.

Johnson signed with the Helsinki Roosters in 2012. Johnson led the team to three consecutive Finnish Championships in 2012, 2013 and 2014. In 2014 Helsinki Roosters played also in the new IFAF Champions League which the team also won. Johnson injured his knee during the 2014 season and was replaced by Sean Shelton. Johnson signed with the Turku Trojans for 2015.

Johnson became head coach of the Helsinki Wolverines in 2016. Wolverines played in the 1st Division for the time being. Johnston took over also the quarterback position for the 2017 season and led the team to division championship in 2018. He was also chosen as the player of the year of the 1st Division. Johnson played for the Helsinki Wolverines through season 2019 in Vaahteraliiga and then signed with the United Newland Crusaders. He played for the Crusaders until the end of 2021 season.

In 2022 Johnson served as a head coach for the East City Giants.

== Achievement ==
- Big 12 Conference Offensive Newcomer of the Year, 2005
- Finnish Championship, 2007, 2010, 2012, 2013, 2014
- Vaahteraliiga player of the year, 2012, 2013
- IFAF Champions League title, 2014
- Finnish 1st Division player of the year, 2018
