= Michael Quarshie =

German gridiron football player (born 1979)

Profile
- Position: Defensive tackle

Personal information
- Born: November 13, 1979 (age 46); Erlangen, Germany
- Listed height: 6 ft 2 in (1.88 m)
- Listed weight: 290 lb (132 kg)

Career information
- College: Columbia, Saint Peter's College

Career history
- 2005: Frankfurt Galaxy
- 2005–2006: Oakland Raiders
- 2007: Porvoo Butchers
- 2008: Toronto Argonauts

Michael Quarshie (born 13 November 1979) is a Finnish American football defensive tackle.

Quarshie was born in Germany in 1979. After living in Germany for six years and in Ghana for a short period, his family moved to Finland. He graduated from high school and completed his mandatory military service before moving to the U.S. to study and play football.

Quarshie is a member of the Finnish men's national team, which captured silver at the 2001 European Championships, and of the Finnish junior men's national team, which captured the 1997 Nordic Championship. He played for the Helsinki Roosters club, winning the Finnish Maple (Championship) Bowl in 1997, 1999, and 2000.

Undrafted after his senior season, Quarshie played for the Frankfurt Galaxy the following NFL Europe season. He was one of eight (along with fellow Finn Klaus Alinen) signed to NFL as an International Practice Squad member. Quarshie was able to practice with the Raiders and play in pre-season games as an extra training squad member. He was then signed the following year with the Oakland Raiders and played during the pre-season but spent the regular season on the Injured Reserve list. Quarshie played in Finland for the Porvoo Butchers during 2007 and signed as a free agent with the Toronto Argonauts on February 15, 2008.
