= Iiro Luoto =

Finnish gridiron football player (born 1984)

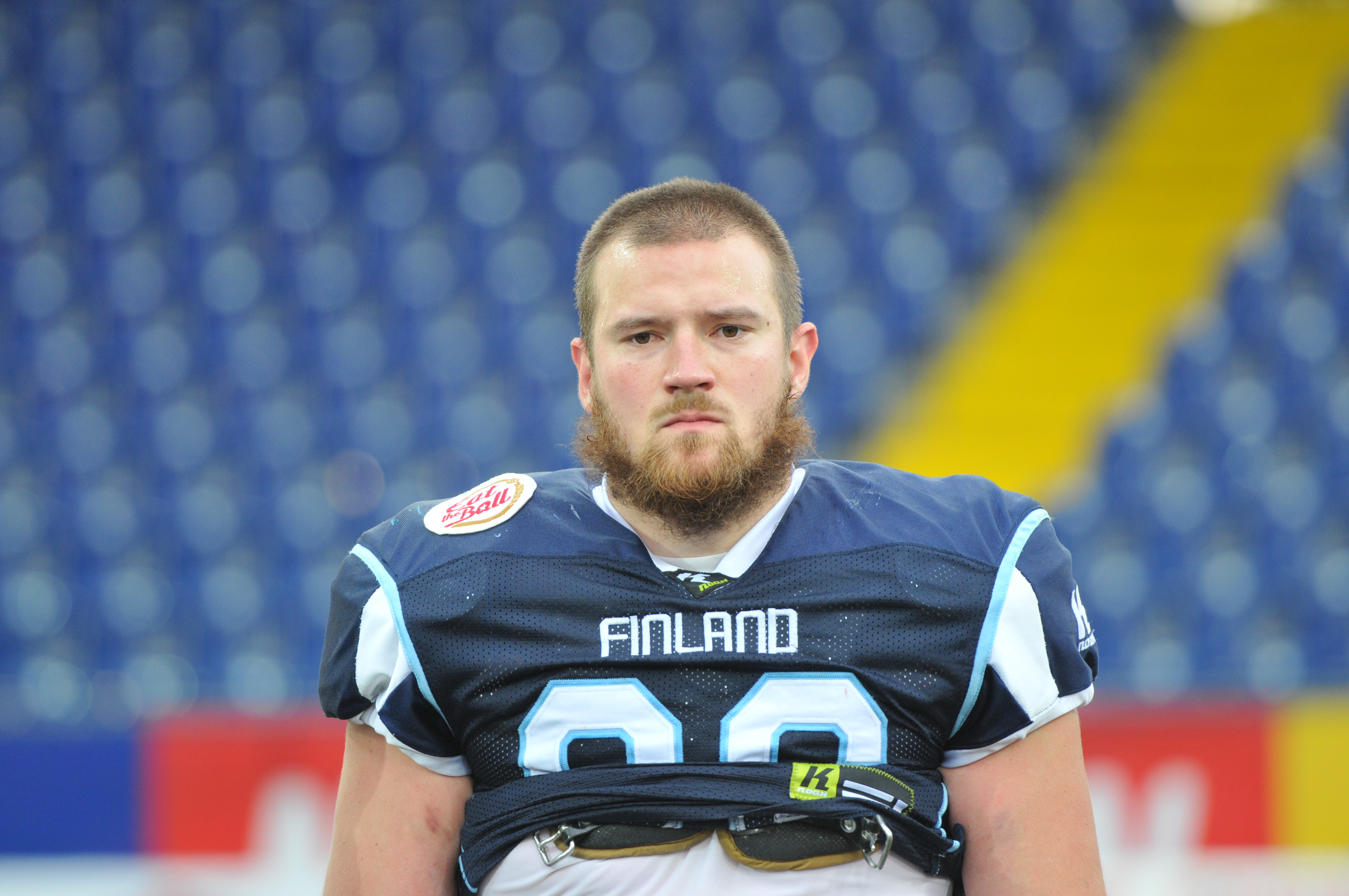

No. 84
- Position: Tight end

Personal information
- Born: October 8, 1984 (age 42); Espoo, Finland
- Listed height: 6 ft 5 in (1.96 m)
- Listed weight: 257 lb (117 kg)

Career information
- College: No College

Career history
- Helsinki Roosters (2001–2005); Frankfurt Galaxy (2006); Rhein Fire (2007); New York Jets (2007)*; Calanda Broncos (2011–2013); Helsinki Wolverines (2013–2014); Helsinki Roosters 2014- present
- * Offseason or practice squad member only

Iiro Luoto (born October 8, 1984) is a Finnish gridiron football tight end for the Helsinki Roosters. Luoto was a international practice squad player for the New York Jets of the National Football League. He originally played for the Helsinki Roosters at the Vaahteraliiga (Maple league). He then played two seasons in NFL Europa before being assigned to the Jets in 2007. Luoto was transferred from Calanda Broncos to Helsinki Wolverines in February 2013. He has again played for the Roosters since 2014.
