= Chris Mulumba (defensive lineman) =

Finnish gridiron football player (born 1992)

No. 16 – Frankfurt Galaxy
- Position: Defensive lineman

Personal information
- Born: 10 October 1992 (age 34); Helsinki, Finland
- Listed height: 6 ft 4 in (1.93 m)
- Listed weight: 285 lb (129 kg)

Career information
- College: Chabot College (2014); Diablo Valley College (2015); Colorado (2017–2018)
- CFL draft: 2021G: 2nd round, 11th overall pick

Career history
- 2012: Helsinki Roosters
- 2021–2023: Hamilton Tiger-Cats
- 2024–2025: Stuttgart Surge
- 2026–present: Frankfurt Galaxy

Awards and highlights
- ELF champion (2025); First-team All-Bay 6 Conference (2015); Maple Bowl champion (XXXIII)
- Stats at CFL.ca

Chris Mulumba
Medal record

Men's American football

Representing Finland

Nordic U19 Championships
Silver medal – second place	2010 Vantaa	Team

Chris Muana Mulumba (born 10 October 1992) is a Finnish professional gridiron football defensive lineman for the Frankfurt Galaxy of the European Football Alliance (EFA). He played college football for the Colorado Buffaloes and was selected eleventh overall by the Hamilton Tiger-Cats in the 2021 CFL global draft. He also played for the Stuttgart Surge of the European League of Football (ELF).

Mulumba was named the Finnish Player by the Year by the Association of Sports Journalists in 2017, 2018, and 2021.

== Early life ==
Mulumba was born on 10 October 1992 in Helsinki, Finland. His parents, Annina and Etienne, immigrated to the country to escape conflict in their native Democratic Republic of the Congo in 1991, and Chris grew up fluent in both Finnish and French as a result. His father worked as a teaching assistant at a Finnish school while his mother worked as a nurse.

Mulumba excelled in judo in his childhood, earning a black belt in the discipline. He was a three-time age-group national champion, including twice at the under-20 level, and represented Finland in international competitions, winning a silver medal at the 2009 Nordic U20 Championships. He also wrestled for his high school. He credits his background in these sports with helping him with his hands, balance and leverage.

Mulumba was introduced to American football through a friend at the age of 17, joining the Helsinki Roosters youth team. He compared the sport's one-on-one aspect to judo and figured he just had to win his matchup at the line of scrimmage on every play. Mulumba succeeded in the junior leagues and quickly earned a spot on the Finland under-17 national team. He was promoted to the Roosters senior team in 2012 and helped them win the Maple Bowl that season. Soon afterwards Mulumba served his year of mandatory military service in the Finnish Army, training at the Defense Forces Sports School in Santahamina. He realized he could possibly earn a living by playing football, so he moved to the United States to pursue a career.

== College career ==
=== Junior college ===
After his year in the Army, Mulumba received an offer to play at the University of Northern Colorado. One of his coaches in Finland, Sami Porkka, had played for the Bears in the early 1990s and helped Mulumba send his highlight tape to the school. However, he was not able to pass the English language test, forcing him to take the junior college route. Mulumba enrolled at Chabot College in Hayward, California, with the help of former Helsinki Roosters teammates who had played at the school. In his lone season with the Gladiators, he recorded 35 tackles, four tackles for loss, and one sack. Mulumba transferred to Diablo Valley College as a sophomore and tallied 63 tackles, nine tackles for losses, and four sacks in 10 games, earning first-team all-Bay 6 Conference honors. He had a season-high 17 tackles in a game against College of the Siskiyous.

=== Colorado ===
Following the 2015 season, Mulumba took official visits to UCF, Central Michigan, Fresno State, Houston and New Mexico. He signed a National Letter of Intent to play for UCF in February 2016. However, Mulumba de-committed and essentially redshirted the 2016 season to focus on academics instead. He signed with Colorado as a mid-year transfer that December after Buffaloes safety Kyle Trego, a former teammate of his at Diablo Valley, recommended him to Colorado defensive line coach Jim Jeffcoat. "Chris is an excellent defensive end and outside linebacker, is powerful and strong and has a very good first step on his pass rush," said Colorado head coach Mike MacIntyre. "We're excited about him being here at the University of Colorado playing defensive end for us."

Heading into his first season at Colorado in 2017, Mulumba earned a starting role on the defensive line during preseason camp. He finished his junior year with 39 tackles, one tackle for loss, and half a sack in 12 games. Following spring practices in 2018, Mulumba was given the team's Ron Scott Award as the most improved defensive lineman. He was also named to the Ted Hendricks Award preseason watchlist and was a preseason third-team All-Pac-12 Conference selection by Phil Steele College Football. However, Mulumba received decreased playing time in a more rotational role, in part due to injuries, and recorded 24 tackles and one sack in 12 games.

== Professional career ==
In October 2019, Mulumba participated in the National Football League (NFL) International Combine in Cologne, Germany. From there, he was selected as one of nine participants in the 2020 International Player Pathway Program (IPPP). Mulumba trained for two months at the IMG Academy in Bradenton, Florida before the campus was closed due the COVID-19 pandemic. Instead of attending their planned in-person Pro Day, the players recorded their performances in the combine drills on video and sent the tapes to all 32 teams. However, Mulumba was not among the four IPPP athletes who were assigned to NFL teams and instead returned home to Finland continue training on his own.

=== Hamilton Tiger-Cats ===
In January 2020, Mulumba participated in the CFL-Finland Combine in Vantaa, Finland, the first in a series of global combines held by the Canadian Football League (CFL) in Europe, Mexico, and Japan to assess players outside of Canada and the U.S.

Mulumba was selected by the Hamilton Tiger-Cats in the second round, with the 11th overall pick, of the 2021 CFL global draft. He officially signed with the team on 28 April. Mulumba made his team debut on 5 November during the Tiger-Cats' 26–18 win over the BC Lions, becoming the second Finnish player to play in a CFL regular-season game (after Kimi Linnainmaa). The Tiger-Cats reached the Grey Cup that year, losing to the Winnipeg Blue Bombers. Mulumba was released by the Tiger-Cats on 5 November 2023.

=== Stuttgart Surge ===
In March 2024, Mulumba signed with the Stuttgart Surge of the European League of Football (ELF). He played two seasons with the Surge, helping them win the ELF championship in 2025 after starting all three playoff games.

=== Frankfurt Galaxy ===
Mulumba signed with the Frankfurt Galaxy of the European Football Alliance (EFA) ahead of the 2026 EFA season. He was named the week 4 MVP after recording four sacks, a tackle for loss, and a safety in a 21–5 win over the Raiders Tirol, marking Frankfurt's first win of the season.

== National team career ==
In October 2009, Mulumba was called up to the Finland national under-17 team and appeared in a friendly against Sweden in Stockholm, which they lost 34–7. He helped the national under-19 team win the silver medal at the 2010 Nordic U19 Championships before appearing in a European U19 Championship qualifier against Denmark the following year.

In October 2012, Mulumba debuted for the senior national team in a friendly against Sweden in Helsinki, which they lost 20–3.

== Personal life ==
Mulumba was born in Finland to parents from the Democratic Republic of Congo, and much of his family still lives in Kinshasa. He has two sisters, both of whom played college basketball; Audrey played at Arizona Western College and Mount Mercy University while Gloria played at Arizona Western. Mulumba also has a younger brother named Etienne, Jr.
