= Noronen =

Surname list

Noronen is a surname. Notable people with the surname include:

- Mika Noronen (born 1979), Finnish ice hockey player
- Riikka Noronen (born 1982), Finnish ice hockey player
- Roope Noronen (born 1974), Finnish sport administrator
