= Tim Johnson (American football coach) =

American football player and coach (born 1962)

Biographical details
- Born: May 15, 1962 (age 64); Kansas City, Missouri, U.S.

Playing career
- 1981–1984: William Jewell
- Position: Linebacker

Coaching career (HC unless noted)
- 2000–2004: Avila

Head coaching record
- Overall: 17–30
- Bowls: 0–1

Tim Johnson (born May 15, 1962) is an American football coach and former player. He played high school football at Rockhurst High School in Kansas City, Missouri, and college football at William Jewell College from 1981 to 1984. He was an All-American linebacker and Academic All-American. He was inducted into the William Jewell College Athletic Hall of Fame in 2005. Johnson also played in Finland and later coached in Europe as well.

== Europe ==
In 1985, Johnson signed with and played professionally for the East City Giants of Finland's Vaahteraliiga. He also played two seasons for the Helsinki Roosters and later coached in the league for various teams and other European leagues.

== Coaching ==
Johnson was hired at Lambuth University as special teams coordinator in 1994 and was promoted to defensive coordinator in 1995.

In 1999 Johnson was hired by Avila University in Kansas City, Missouri to start the school's football program. He served as head football coach at Avila from 2000 until 2004, compiling a record of 17–30. In 2004, he took Avila to the Wheat Bowl, its first bowl game, losing to Midland Lutheran by a score of 31–9. Johnson's 2003 team went 5–5, completing the only non-losing season in Avila's history as a National Association of Intercollegiate Athletics (NAIA) participant.

== Head coaching record ==
Year	Team	Overall	Conference	Standing	Bowl/playoffs
Avila Eagles (Independent club team) (2000)
2000	Avila	4–2			
Avila Eagles (Heart of America Athletic Conference) (2001–2004)
2001	Avila	2–8	2–8	10th	
2002	Avila	4–6	4–6	T–6th	
2003	Avila	5–5	5–5	T–4th	
2004	Avila	2–9	2–8	T–10th	L Wheat
Avila:		17–30	13–27		
Total:		17–30			
