= Ken Meyer =

American football coach (1925–2016)

Personal information
- Born: July 14, 1925; Erie, Pennsylvania, U.S.
- Died: August 14, 2016 (aged 91); Gadsden, Alabama, U.S.

Career information
- High school: Harbor (OH)
- College: Denison

Career history
- Wake Forest (1958–1959) Assistant; Florida State (1960–1962) Assistant; Alabama (1963–1967) Assistant; San Francisco 49ers (1968) Backs coach; New York Jets (1969–1972) Backs coach; Los Angeles Rams (1973–1976) Offensive coordinator; San Francisco 49ers (1977) Head coach; Chicago Bears (1978–1980) Offensive coordinator; Tulane (1981–1982) Offensive coordinator; Seattle Seahawks (1983–1991) Quarterbacks coach; Turku Trojans (1993–1994) Head coach; Roma Gladiatori (1996) Head coach; Finland national team (1993–1997)

Head coaching record
- Career: 5–9 (.357)
- Coaching profile at Pro Football Reference

Kenneth W. Meyer (July 14, 1925 – August 14, 2016) was an American football coach at the high school, collegiate and professional levels. He may be best remembered as the head coach of the National Football League (NFL)'s San Francisco 49ers in 1977, and winning two college national championships at Alabama coaching under Bear Bryant. He was a head coach in Finland's top league Vaahteraliiga and for the Finland national American football team.

== Early life ==
Ken Meyer was the son of Werner Meyer and Pauline (Uhrmacher). Meyer graduated from Ashtabula Harbor High School in 1943, and was inducted into the Ashtabula County Football Hall of Fame in 2004. He was proud to have served as a staff sergeant in the mighty 8th Air Force during World War II and flew 25 missions over Germany as a tail gunner on a B-17 Flying Fortress. He maintained close ties with the men in his bomber group, and was an active supporter and past president of the 305th Bomber Group Association.

== Playing career ==
Meyer played quarterback at Denison University under legendary football coach Woody Hayes before Hayes became head coach at the Ohio State University. Meyer set several single season and career school records, one of which still stands, and the team's record was 22–3 during his varsity career. He was elected to Denison's Athletic Hall of Fame in 1987.

== College coaching career ==
Meyer gained his first coaching experience as head coach at an Ohio high school. From 1952 to 1957, he was an assistant at his alma mater before accepting an assistant coaching position at Wake Forest University in 1958. After two years with the Demon Deacons, he moved on to take another assistant position, this time with the Florida State Seminoles. While with Florida State, he recruited and coached future NFL quarterback Steve Tensi and future Pro Football Hall of Famer Fred Biletnikoff.

Following three years in that capacity, Meyer accepted an assistant's role in 1963 at the University of Alabama under Bear Bryant. During his five years with the Crimson Tide, he worked with the team's quarterbacks, a group which included future Pro Football Hall of Famer Joe Namath, as well as Super Bowl winning signal caller Ken Stabler. Alabama's combined record during this time was 47–6–2, including five straight top-10 seasons, an undefeated year finishing #3 in the country, plus two national championships.

== NFL coaching career ==
When Dick Nolan was hired as head coach of the 49ers in 1968, he hired Meyer to tutor the team's offensive backs. After one year, Meyer departed to accept a similar role with the New York Jets, reuniting him with Namath. Despite coming off a win in Super Bowl III, the Jets were never able to recapture their magic during Meyer's four years with the team, with major injuries to Namath serving as a major culprit. On February 6, 1973, Meyer left the Jets to accept the position of offensive coordinator with the Los Angeles Rams, reuniting him with Chuck Knox, who had worked with him at Wake Forest. During four frustrating years, the team reached the NFC Championship Game three times, but lost on each occasion.

Meyer became an NFL head coach when he was appointed by the 49ers on April 19, 1977, succeeding Monte Clark who had been forced out earlier that month as a result of losing a power struggle to general manager Joe Thomas. Following a 5–9–0 campaign, he was fired on January 10, 1978, and replaced by Pete McCulley who had actually been Thomas' first choice for the position before settling for Meyer. He returned to coaching nine weeks later as the offensive coordinator with the Chicago Bears under new head coach Neill Armstrong. The Bears reached the postseason once in Meyer's three seasons, with the veteran coach resigning on December 24, 1980.

Meyer returned to the college ranks for the next two years, serving as offensive coordinator for Tulane University. When former mentor Chuck Knox became head coach of the Seattle Seahawks, he hired Meyer as an assistant on February 24, 1983, where he was quarterbacks coach Seahawks through the 1991 season. He helped guide the Seahawks to the 1983 AFC Championship game and the 1988 AFC West Division title.

== Finland|Europe coaching career ==
The American Football Association of Finland invited Meyer to run a quarterback clinic in 1992 and he returned to the country in 1993 to coach the Turku Trojans in the (Maple League) Vaahteraliiga. The Trojans reached the Maple Bowl Championship game in both 1993 and 1994, losing both to the Helsinki East City Giants — the 1994 final ending 24–7. The Giants' starting quarterback during this era was American import Brett Salisbury, a former international male model ranked among L'Uomo Vogue's Top 25 Male Models of All Time, and a Wayne State College alumnus inducted into the school's athletics Hall of Fame as part of the 1993 team. Meyer was also head coach of the Roma Gladiatori in the Italian Football League in the 1996 season. Meyer was named the head coach of the Finland national American football team from 1993 to 1997. Finland won the European Championship under Meyer in 1993, 1995, and 1997. He also was an assistant coach with Team Finland Juniors in the 1996 European Championship tournament held in Frankfurt where Team Finland won all its games. In September 2014 Meyer became the 20th person to be inducted to Finnish American Football Hall of Fame. He is also the first and currently only non-Finnish person to be inducted. He died in Gadsden, Alabama on August 14, 2016.

== Head coaching record ==
=== NFL ===
| Team | Year | Regular season | | | | |
| Team | Year | Won | Lost | Ties | Win % | Finish |
|---|---|---|---|---|---|---|
| SF | 1977 | 5 | 9 | 0 | .357 | 3rd in NFC West |
| SF total | | 5 | 9 | 0 | .357 | |
| Total | | 5 | 9 | 0 | .357 | |
