= Chris Mulumba =

Chris Mulumba may refer to:

- Christophe Mulumba-Tshimanga (born 1988), Canadian gridiron football linebacker
- Chris Mulumba (defensive lineman) (born 1992), Finnish gridiron football defensive tackle
