= Sports Museum of Finland =

Museum in Helsinki, Finland

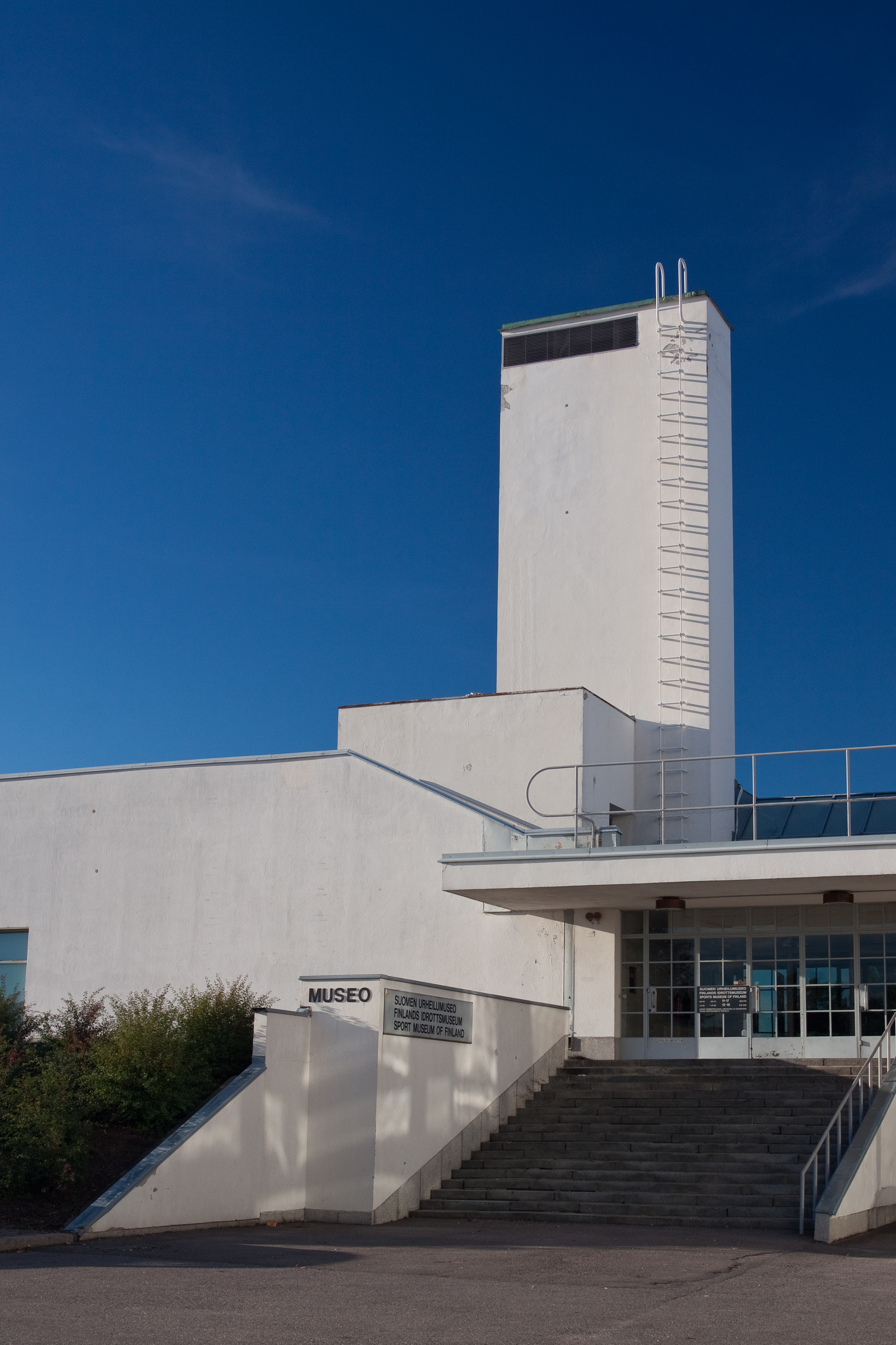
The Sports Museum of Finland

The Sports Museum of Finland also known as the TAHTO is a museum specialising in sports and physical activity located at the Helsinki Olympic Stadium in Helsinki.

== Collection ==
The museum features more than 30,000 objects from various sports and sports culture. The oldest artifact is an ancient ski from c2,500 years ago. The collections include Teemu Selälä's ice hockey jersey and Mikael Forssell's football boots. The cultural centre receives its items mainly as donations. Famous sports figures, such as Paavo Nurmi and Kimi Räikkönen, have donated their equipment and prizes to the museum.

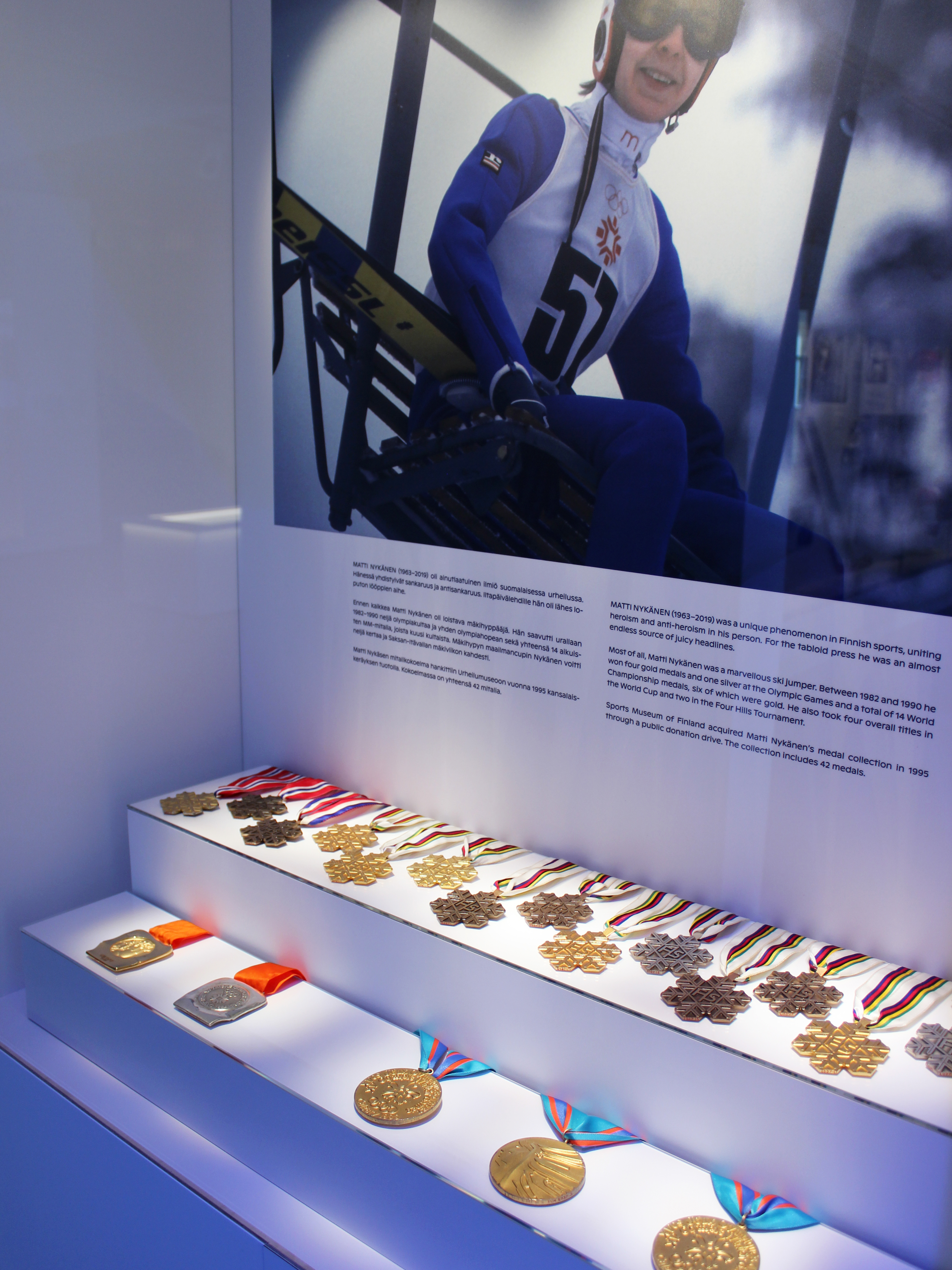
Matti Nykänen's Olympics medal collection at the museum

The museum holds more than 300,000 photographs from the 1880s to the present day. The largest special collection is from the Helsinki Olympic Games in 1952: more than 10,000 negatives from the organisation of the Games to the closing ceremony.

== See also ==
- Sport in Helsinki
