= Scooter Molander =

American football player and coach (born 1966)

No. 3
- Position: Quarterback

Personal information
- Born: October 25, 1966 (age 60)
- Listed height: 6 ft 2 in (1.88 m)
- Listed weight: 205 lb (93 kg)

Career information
- High school: Corona del Sol (Tempe, Arizona)
- College: Colorado State
- NFL draft: 1989: undrafted

Career history

Playing
- Cleveland Browns (1989)*; Kansas City Chiefs (1989)*; New York Giants (1990)*; New York/New Jersey Knights (1991)*; Oregon Lightning Bolts (1992); Charlotte Rage (1992); Espoo Colts (1993); Las Vegas Sting (1994–1995); Anaheim Piranhas (1996); Helsinki Roosters (1997–1998)
- * Offseason or practice squad member only

Coaching
- Northern Colorado Bears (1989) (WR); Boulder Panthers (QB / WR); Espoo Colts (1993) (OC); Helsinki Roosters (1997–1998) (OC); Brophy Broncos (2001–2003) (Asst); Brophy Broncos (2004–2017) (HC); Eastmark Firebirds (2019–2022) (HC); Desert Vista High School (2023) (HC); Queen Creek High School (2024–2025) (OC); Eastmark High School (2026–present) (HC)

Career AFL statistics
- Comp. / Att.: 764 / 1,315
- Passing yards: 8,545
- TD–INT: 124–46
- Passer rating: 86.57
- Rushing TDs: 15
- Stats at ArenaFan.com

Andrew "Scooter" Molander (born October 25, 1966) is an American former professional football quarterback who played four seasons in the Arena Football League (AFL) with the Charlotte Rage, Las Vegas Sting, and Anaheim Piranhas. He first enrolled at Phoenix College before transferring to Colorado State University. Molander was also a member of the Cleveland Browns, Kansas City Chiefs, and New York Giants of the National Football League (NFL).

== Early life ==
Molander attended Corona del Sol High School in Tempe, Arizona.

== College career ==
Molander first played college football for the Phoenix Bears of Phoenix College from 1985 to 1986. He led them to a second place national ranking in 1985 and a sixth-place ranking in 1986. In 1986, Scooter was named to the 1st Team All-ACCAC and was named Honorable mention All-American. He was inducted into the Phoenix College Athletics Hall of Fame in 2008 and the Phoenix College Hall of Fame in 2013.

Molander transferred to play for the Colorado State Rams of Colorado State University from 1987 to 1988. He completed 407 of 754 passes for 5,400 yards with 27 touchdowns as the starting quarterback for the Rams.

== Professional career ==
Molander signed with the Cleveland Browns of the National Football League (NFL) in May 1989. He was a member of the Kansas City Chiefs' practice squad in 1989. He spent the 1990 off-season with the New York Giants of the NFL. Molander was released by the Giants on August 27, 1990. He was a member of the New York/New Jersey Knights of the World League of American Football in 1991. He was released by the Knights on March 14, 1991. Molander was a member of the Oregon Lightning Bolts of the Professional Spring Football League. The league never played a game. He played for the Charlotte Rage of the AFL in 1992, recording 28 touchdowns on 1,859 passing yards. In 1993, Molander played for the Espoo Colts in the Vaahteraliiga in Finland, leading the team to a 3-6-1 record. He played for the Las Vegas Sting of the AFL from 1994 to 1995, recording 57 touchdowns on 3,958 passing yards. Molander played for the AFL's Anaheim Piranhas in 1996, recording 39 touchdowns on 2,728 yards. He played for the Helsinki Roosters in 1997-1998 seasons winning the Vaahteraliiga championship in both seasons. In the 1997 regular season he threw for 1,101 yards and 16 touchdowns in ten games.

== Coaching career ==
Molander was wide receivers coach for the Northern Colorado Bears of the University of Northern Colorado in 1989. He later became quarterbacks and receivers coach for the Boulder High School Panthers in Boulder, Colorado. He was owner, trainer, and coach of Personalized Quarterback Training in Denver, Colorado and Phoenix, Arizona from 1994 to 2000. Molander was offensive coordinator of the Espoo Colts in Finland in 1993. He was also offensive coordinator and Quarterback for the Helsinki Roosters of Helsinki, Finland from 1997 to 1998. He became linebackers coach for the Brophy College Preparatory Broncos of Brophy College Preparatory in 2001. Molander became head coach of the Broncos in 2004 and won the first football State Championship in the school's history as the team finished with a record of 13-1. He also won the Desert Valley Region Championship in 2005 and 2006. The Broncos won the Arizona 5A1 State Championship in 2007. He resigned as the Broncos head coach in November 2017. In 2019, he was hired as the first ever football head coach at Eastmark High School in Mesa, Arizona. In the 2022 season with the Eastmark Firebirds, he won his third State Championship as a head coach. A few months after the season Molander stepped down from the head coaching job at Eastmark. He was the head coach at Desert Vista High School in 2023. He resigned from Desert Vista to become an assistant at Queen Creek High School, stating "I need to be within 15 minutes of my mother for her health". Molander returned as the head coach at Eastmark in 2026.
