= Pori Bears =

Finnish american football club

Bears
Logo

General information
- Founded: 1982
- Colours

Personnel
- Head coach: Graham Thorpe

League / conference affiliations
- Div. 2

Championships
- Spagettimalja: 0; 1986, 2002

Pori Bears is a Finnish american football club based in Pori, Finland. The team was established in 1982. The Bears will join the Finnish 2nd Division for the 2024 season.

== History ==
Bears have competed in the top-tier league of Finland, Vaahteraliiga, three times (1982, 1987–88, 2003–2004)

Mike Leach served as head coach of the Bears during the 1989 season in Finlands 1st Division. He later became a head football coach at the college level in the USA.

== Honours ==
=== 1st Division (2nd highest level in Finland) ===
(gold) Spagettimalja bowl champion (2): 1986, 2002
