= Helsinki 69ers =

American football team from Helsinki, Finland

Logo

General information
- Founded: 1991
- Stadium: Helsinki Velodrome
- Headquartered: Helsinki, Finland

Personnel
- General manager: (Finland) Jukka Rantala
- Head coach: (United States) Jason Thomas

League / conference affiliations
- Vaahteraliiga

Current uniform
Home kit

Away kit

The Helsinki 69ers are an American football club from Helsinki, Finland. The club was formed in 1991, and its men's first team is currently playing in the third highest level league of American football in Finland.

== History ==
The Helsinki 69ers were formed in 1991. The team started in the lower divisions of Finnish American football and slowly made its way up to 1st Division. The 69ers played 10 seasons in the division, and in 2012, the 69ers won the 1st Division championship, the Spaghettibowl. 69ers won the final against Kouvola Indians with a score of 43–10. For the first time the 69ers had a chance to play in the Vaahteraliiga, the highest level in Finland. The team played its first Vaahteraliiga game in 2013 season against TAFT, losing 41–14.

The club shares their stadium, the Helsinki Velodrome, with two other football teams from Helsinki: the Helsinki Roosters and the Helsinki Wolverines.

== Club Structure ==
The 69ers men's first team played in Vaahteraliiga in the 2014 season and placed sixth after the regular season, missing the playoffs.

The youth section of the club was founded in 2005. 69ers have five boys' youth teams: U11, U13, U15, U17 and U19.

== See also ==
- Helsinki Roosters
- Helsinki Wolverines
