= Roope Noronen =

Finnish sports executive (born 1974)

Roope Noronen (born 1974) is the president of American Football Association of Finland, SAJL.

Noronen has been the president of SAJL since 2001. Noronen has been vice-president of EFAF since 2001 and was elected to serve as Senior Vice-president until 2010. Noronen was also elected into Executive Board of International Federation of American Football IFAF as European representative in 2006. Noronen has led different committees both in EFAF and in IFAF and was a member of tournament committee of World Cup tournament held in Japan in 2007. Noronen had served as Legal Officer on the Executive Board of the International Federation of Cheerleading in 2007.
