= Naisten kymppi =

Naisten kymppi (Finnish for "the women's ten") is an annual running or walking event for women, held in Helsinki, the capital of Finland at the end of May.

The idea of Naisten kymppi is to run or walk a distance of ten kilometres through a pre-determined route in central Helsinki. The route varies slightly every year. Naisten kymppi has been held every year since 1983 and is today the most popular women-only sport event in Finland. Over ten thousand women participate in the event, with the record being 32 thousand women in 1990, when the event was held in Kaivopuisto. Currently the event is held in Töölö, starting and ending near the Helsinki Olympic Stadium.
