= Finnish Champion =

Winner of premier sport competition in Finland

In Finland, the Suomen mestaruus (SM; lit. 'Finnish Champion') is the winner of the highest level of national competition in a particular sport.

Suomen mestaruussarja (lit. 'Finnish Championship'), abbreviated SM-sarja, is the competition in which the winning athlete, team, or club is named Finnish Champion. SM-sarja is commonly used when discussing the highest-level league of a sport that competes for the Finnish Championship or the specific competition in which a Finnish Champion is named, as with the Baseballin SM-sarja, Ringeten SM-sarja, Rugbyn SM-sarja, etc.

The abbreviation SM-liiga (lit. 'Finnish Championship League' from Suomen mestaruusliiga) is a standard term used when a sport has been designated with liiga status. Without qualification, SM-liiga can refer to any Finnish Championship liiga, however, it is most often used when discussing the men's ice hockey Liiga.

== Sports in which the Finnish Championship is contested ==
Sport	League or competition		Current champion(s)
Athletics	Kalevan kisat		multiple disciplines (2025)
Bandy	Bandyliiga (men)		JPS (2026)
Bandy	Naisten Bandyliiga (women)		Porvoon Akilles (2026)
Baseball	Superbaseball		Tampere Tigers (2025)
Basketball	Korisliiga (men)		Salon Vilpas (2026)
Basketball	Naisten Korisliiga (women)		Peli-Karhut (2026)
Cross-country skiing	SM-hiihdot		multiple competition classes (2026)
Disc golf	SM in disk golf	MPO	Daniel Davidsson (2025)
Disc golf	SM in disk golf	FPO	Silva Saarinen (2025)
Figure skating	Taitoluistelun SM-kilpailut	Ice dance	Juulia Turkkila/Matthias Versluis (2026)
Figure skating	Taitoluistelun SM-kilpailut	Pair	no competitors (2026)
Figure skating	Taitoluistelun SM-kilpailut	Single	Matias Lindfors (2026) (men)
Figure skating	Taitoluistelun SM-kilpailut	Single	Iida Karhunen (2026) (women)
Floorball	F-liiga (men)		Esport Oilers (2025)
Floorball	F-liiga (women)		Classic (2025)
American football	Vaahteraliiga (men)		Porvoo Butchers (2025)
American football	Naisten Vaahteraliiga (women)		Helsinki Wolverines (2025)
Football	Veikkausliiga (men)		KuPS (2025)
Football	Kansallinen Liiga (women)		HJK (2025)
Formula racing	Rata-SM		multiple disciplines
Futsal	Futsal-Liiga (men)		Akaa Futsal (2025)
Futsal	Naisten Futsal-Liiga (women)		RaiFu (2025)
Handball	Aktialiiga (men)		Riihimäki Cocks (2025)
Handball	Aktialiiga (women)		GrIFK (2025)
Harness racing	SM in harness racing		Yolo Savoy/Tommi Kylliäinen (2023)
Ice hockey	Liiga (men)		Tappara (2026)
Ice hockey	Auroraliiga (women)		Kiekko-Espoo (2026)
Pesäpallo	Superpesis		Manse PP (2025) (men)
Pesäpallo	Superpesis		Manse PP (2025) (women)
Rallying	Rallin SM-sarja		multiple disciplines (2023)
Rink bandy	Kaukalopallon SM-sarja (men)		RC Pajulahti (2023)
Ringette	SM Ringette (women)		Blue Rings (2025)
Roller in-line hockey	Rullakiekon SM-liiga		Team Haippi (2023)
Rugby union	Rugbyn SM-sarja		Warriors RC (2025)
Synchronized skating	Muodostelmaluistelun SM-kilpailu		Helsinki Rockettes (2026)
Volleyball	Lentopallon Mestaruusliiga (men)		Akaa-Volley (2025)
Volleyball	Lentopallon Mestaruusliiga (women)		Puijo Wolley (2025)
