= Kuopio Steelers =

American football team from Kuopio, Finland

- 2023 season|Current season
- Logo
- Uniforms

General information
- Founded: 1991
- Stadium: Väinölänniemi Stadium
- Headquartered: Kuopio, Finland
- Colours: Black, White, Red
- Website: Steelers.fi

Personnel
- General manager: Jaana Tuppurainen
- Head coach: Michael Mattingly

Nickname
- Steelers

League / conference affiliations
- Suomen Amerikkalaisen Jalkapallon Liitto; Finland Maple League, European 1st Division

Championships
- Finnish Maple League wins: 0; 3 (2020, 2021, 2022)

The Kuopio Steelers (formerly known as Varkaus Steelers) are an American football team originally from Varkaus, Finland in years 1991-2005, and since 2006 from Kuopio, Finland. The team plays in the Finnish Maple League and it has also played in the European Football League. The club's home field is Väinölänniemi Stadium in the Väinölänniemi district.

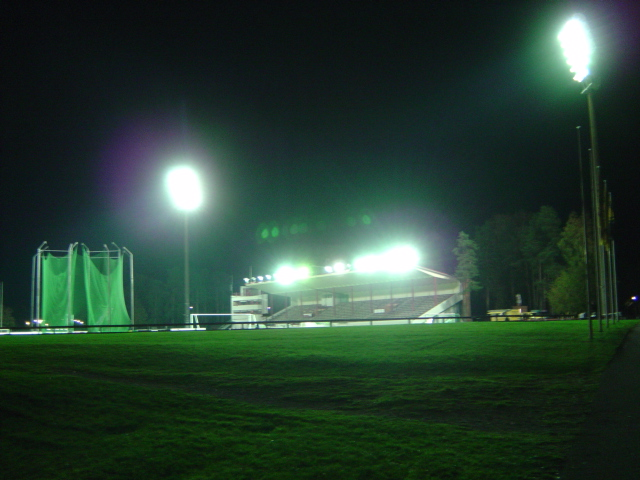
Väinölänniemi Stadium

The Steelers play in the Men’s Maple League as well as various junior leagues in B- (under 19), C- (under 17), D- (under 15) and E-juniors (under 13). In the summer of 2013, the Steelers formed the women’s American football team that participated in the women’s Division I in the 2014 season. In the 2018 season, the team won their own block in Division I and promoted to the Women’s Maple League. The Steelers have won three Finnish championships in 2020, 2021 and 2022.

== Team Roster (2019) ==
=== Staff ===
- Finland Pekka Utriainen (head coach)
- Finland Ari Hartikainen (assistant coach)
- Finland Sami Hovinen (assistant coach)
- Finland Marco Lindroos (assistant coach)
- Finland Petri Pellinen (assistant coach)
- Finland Erkka Vehkomäki (assistant coach)

=== QB ===
- USA # Seth Peters

=== RB & FB ===
- USA # Gerard Johnson
- Finland # Ville Lindsten
- Finland # Perttu Pajunen
- Finland # Samppa Sinkkonen

=== WR ===
- Finland # Johannes Jauhiainen
- Finland # Kaapro Keränen
- Finland # Waltteri Kinnunen
- Finland # Tino Ndongo
- Finland # Jaakko Paananen
- Finland # Ville Simola
- Finland # Petteri Vilpponen
- Finland # Juho Väisänen

=== OL ===
- Finland # Tapio Jääskeläinen
- Finland # Roope Korhonen
- Finland # Oskari Laitinen
- Finland # Niilo Ojansivu
- Finland # Simo Ovaskainen
- Finland # Jupe Peltonen
- Finland # Eppu Pulkkinen
- Finland # Mikael Vilhunen

=== DL ===
- Finland # Matias Kauppinen
- Finland # Perttu Kosonen
- Finland # Jani Lindqvist
- Spain # Victor Miller-Gonzalez
- Finland # Aapo Peräkorpi
- Spain # Artur Pinheiro
- Finland # Leevi Ruotsalainen

=== LB ===
- Sweden # Mattias Eriksson
- USA # Donavan Hayden
- Finland # Teemu Hirvelä
- Finland # Toni Tuppurainen
- Finland # Kusti Ukkonen
- Finland # Aku Uotila

=== CB/S ===
- Finland # Iisakki Eskelinen
- Finland # Toni Hartikainen
- Finland # Santeri Inkinen
- Poland # Thomas Kaczocha
- Finland # Markus Ojainväli
- Finland # Leevi Ojala
- Finland # Iiro Pekkarinen
- Finland # Tiivo Savolainen

== See also ==
- Helsinki Roosters
- Porvoo Butchers
- Seinäjoki Crocodiles
- Tampere Saints
