= Finnish 1st Division (American football) =

- Sport: American football
- Founded: 1983
- No. of teams: 6
- Country: Finland
- Most recent champion: Kuusankoski Cowboys
- Most titles: Vantaa TAFT (4)
- Promotion to: Vaahteraliiga
- Relegation to: 2nd division
- Website: I-divisioona

The Finnish 1st Division (Finnish: I-divisioona) is the second highest level of American football in Finland played under American Football Association of Finland. The title game of the 1st division is called Spagettimalja ("Spaghetti Bowl").

== Current teams (2026 season) ==
- Kerava Bulldogs
- Lohja Crusaders
- Jyväskylä Jaguars
- Oulu Northern Lights
- Pirkkala Spartans
- Turku Trojans

== Champions ==
- 1983: Oulu Northern Lights
- 1984: Tampere Rocks
- 1985: Jyväskylä Rangers
- 1986: Pori Bears
- 1987: Hyvinkää Falcons
- 1988: Vantaa TAFT
- 1989: Kannelmäki Whips
- 1990: Porvoo Butchers
- 1991: Seinäjoki Crocodiles
- 1992: Tampere Rocks
- 1993: Vantaa TAFT
- 1994: Hyvinkää Falcons
- 1995: Rovaniemi AC Stars
- 1996: Espoo Colts
- 1997: Lappeenrannan Rajaritarit
- 1998: Oulu Northern Lights
- 1999: Jyväskylä Jaguaarit
- 2000: Helsinki Wolverines
- 2001: Porvoo Butchers
- 2002: Pori Bears
- 2003: GS Demons
- 2004: GS Demons
- 2005: GS Demons
- 2006: Jyväskylä Jaguaarit
- 2007: Tampere Saints
- 2008: Lappeenrannan Rajaritarit
- 2009: Kuopio Steelers
- 2010: Vantaa TAFT
- 2011: Vantaa TAFT
- 2012: Helsinki 69ers
- 2013: Turku Trojans
- 2014: Wasa Royals
- 2015: Tampere Saints
- 2016: Hämeenlinna Huskies
- 2017: Kuopio Steelers
- 2018: Helsinki Wolverines
- 2019: Kotka Eagles
- 2020: UNC Crusaders
- 2021: Kotka Eagles
- 2022: Wasa Royals
- 2023: Tampere Saints
- 2024: Helsinki East City Giants
- 2025: Kuusankoski Cowboys
