= Tampere Saints =

American football team from Tampere, Finland

Uniforms

General information
- Founded: 1998
- Stadium: Pyynikki Field
- Headquartered: Tampere

Personnel
- Head coach: Hannes Mattila

League / conference affiliations
- Vaahteraliiga

Championships
- Division championships: 0; 2 (2007 and 2015)

Tampere Saints is an American football club in the city of Tampere, Finland. Its men's senior team currently play in SAJL second highest league 1st division.

== History ==
The club was established in the fall of 1998, becoming the third in city's history. Previous clubs Rocks (1983-1991), Ilves (----) and Patriots (1995-1997, officially Pyynikki Patriots according to their home field) had all fallen to economic difficulties. The new club entered its first full-season competition in 1999, playing in SAJL's 1st division. From its early years, the club has expanded to field also junior teams and a women's contact football team.

== Men's team ==
Club's flagship team, the men's team, has been in existence since the establishment of the club. Their biggest success came in 2007 and 2015 when they conquered Finnish 1st division championship (below Maple League). With those wins the team was promoted to play in Vaahteraliiga Maple League, the top-tier league in Finnish American football league system. In three season (2008, 2009, 2010) the team could only amass two wins in a total of 32 games with two entirely winless seasons. After the 2010 campaign the team voluntarily relegated themselves and begun the 2011 season in 2nd division. In 2015, the team was able to pull 4 wins from 12 games and was one win from playoffs.

== Junior teams ==
The junior program was started for 2005 season when the club fielded teams in A- ja C-junior leagues. In the years, the club has had a team in every age class from E(under 13) to A at least at some point. Junior teams are ... national championship.. B-juniors' 7-man football championship in 2014. The club's C-junior teams have also been runners-up (2008) and 3rd place finishers (2005) as well as 1st division champions (2012).

Tommi Pinta played on a four-year scholarship at NAIA's Missouri Valley College. Hannes Mattila played one year of high school football at Mount Saints Joseph's High in Vermont, receiving a scholarship to Texas A&M University–Kingsville. Lauri Anttila enjoyed two years at Forsyth County Day School and one year at Averett College. Ilari Laine has also two years of high school football and JUCO. Several players have played in European fields.

== See also ==
- Helsinki Roosters
- Porvoo Butchers
- Seinäjoki Crocodiles
- Turku Trojans
