= American Football Association of Finland =

Finnish sports organization

- Suomen Amerikkalaisen Jalkapallon Liitto
- Founded: 1979
- Type: National governing body
- Headquarters: Helsinki, Finland
- Website: sajl.fi

The American Football Association of Finland (Finnish: Suomen Amerikkalaisen Jalkapallon Liitto, abbreviated SAJL) is the national governing body of American football in Finland. It was founded in 1979 and is a founding member of the European Federation of American Football (EFAF) and the International Federation of American Football (IFAF).

Since 2000, American football participation in Finland has grown steadily. In 2006 there were 27 clubs playing the sport with over 100 teams and over 1,400 players. By 2012, the association's competitions fielded over 150 teams with more than 2,200 licensed players.

The President of the American Football Association of Finland is Roope Noronen.

== Members ==
The sport is organized on a club basis in Finland. In 2013, the association had a total of 36 active member clubs. The largest concentration of clubs (5) is in the capital city Helsinki, with 3 additional clubs in the metropolitan area or neighboring municipalities. Besides Helsinki, Jyväskylä is the only other city that hosts two or more clubs (Jaguaarit and Jaguars).

== Leagues ==
American football in Finland is played in men's, women's, and youth leagues.

=== Men's leagues ===
Men's teams are divided into four divisions.

- Vaahteraliiga (Maple League) — The national premier league. The championship game is called the Vaahteramalja (Maple Bowl).
- 1st Division — The second tier. The championship game is called the Spagettimalja (Spaghetti Bowl).
- 2nd Division — Plays 11-man football. The championship game is called the Rautamalja (Iron Bowl).
- 3rd Division — The lowest tier of 11-man football. The championship game is called the Tinamalja (Tin Bowl).
- 4th Division — The 7-man football league for starting clubs and reserve teams.

==== League license system ====
The two highest tiers operate under a league license system where teams must meet organizational and economic standards in addition to competitive performance. Teams must apply annually for placement in Maple League and the 1st Division.

=== Youth and women's leagues ===
Youth leagues are organized by age categories: A-juniors (21 and under), B-juniors (19 and under), C-juniors (17 and under), D-juniors (15 and under), and E-juniors (13 and under).

Women's tackle football was introduced in 2008. Women compete in 9-on-9 rules at the championship level and 7-on-7 in the 1st Division from 2013 onwards. As of 2014, women's championship play uses 11-on-11 rules in alignment with international IFAF standards.

== National teams ==
SAJL currently fields five national teams: men's senior, U-19, U-17, U-15, and women's team.

=== Men's senior national team ===
The men's national team has participated in European Championship tournaments since their beginning in 1983. Finland has won the European Championship 5 times (1985, 1993, 1995, 1997, and 2000) and finished second in 1983, 1991, and 2001, and third in 1987 and 2005. Finland has also participated in World Championship tournaments in 1999 and qualification rounds in 2003 and 2007.

=== Men's U-19 national team ===
The first junior national team was established in 1988. Finland won the first three European Junior Championships (1992, 1994, 1996) and has participated in every biannual championship except 2002, when Finland lost the qualification match to the Czech Republic. Finland has also participated in the Nordic Junior Championship since 1997, winning four gold and two silver medals.

=== Men's U-17 national team ===
This national team began in 2007. Finland won the inaugural U-16 Nordic Championship in 2008, defeating Sweden 33-6. The age limit was adjusted to 17 in 2009 to meet EFAF regulations.

=== Men's U-15 national team ===
Finland has been active in international youth flag football competitions, achieving fourth place in the 2006 European Championships. Finland won 4 of 5 European Championships in 9-man flag football from 1995 to 1999.

=== Women's national team ===
The women's national team was established in 2000. In the 2004 World Championship, Finland's teams took silver in 7-vs-7 competition and placed fourth in 5-vs-5. Finland won the European Championship in 2005 and took bronze in 2006. Finland finished second in the 2007 European Championship.

Finland earned third place in the inaugural Women's World Championship in 2010, defeating Germany 26-18 in the bronze medal game. Finland hosted the second Women's World Championship in 2013.

=== Finland vs. Sweden ===
Finland and Sweden have a rivalry in American football as in other sports. The men's senior teams played annually from 1992-1998, and this tradition was revived in 2003. The U-19, U-17, and women's teams also compete against Sweden on a regular basis since their inaugural matchups in 2008.

== International coaching and player presence ==
International coaches and athletes have been involved with Finnish American football. Ken Meyer, a former NFL quarterbacks coach for the Seattle Seahawks, served as head coach of the Finland national team from 1993 to 1997, during which Finland won three European Championships. Meyer also coached in the Vaahteraliiga as head coach of the Turku Trojans. In the 1994 Maple League Championship game, Meyer's Trojans lost to Brett Salisbury's team. While coaching the Seahawks in 1986, Meyer worked with Sean Salisbury, Brett's older brother.

Scooter Molander, a former NFL and Arena Football League quarterback, played and coached in the Vaahteraliiga during the 1990s. He served as offensive coordinator for the Espoo Colts in 1993 and later as quarterback and offensive coordinator for the Helsinki Roosters from 1997 to 1998, contributing to the team's back-to-back Vaahteraliiga championships in both years.

Brett Salisbury played in the Maple League and set a league record with 9 touchdown passes in a single game on August 1, 1995, against Vantaa TAFT.

== Finnish American Football Hall of Fame ==
SAJL established the Finnish American Football Hall of Fame in 2004 to honor people distinguished in Finnish American football. The hall includes players, coaches, and builders who have contributed significantly to the sport in Finland.
