= Vaahteraliiga =

American football league in Finland

- Sport: American football
- Founded: 1980
- No. of teams: 7
- Country: Finland
- Most recent champion: Seinäjoki Crocodiles (2026)
- Most titles: Helsinki Roosters (23 titles)
- Relegation to: 1st division
- Website: Vaahteraliiga

The Vaahteraliiga (Maple League) founded in 1980 is the highest level of American football in Finland played under American Football Association of Finland. The winner of the Vaahteraliiga is the Finnish champion. The Vaahteraliiga season is played in summer, with a schedule usually from May to September.

== History ==
The first season of the Vaahteraliiga was played in 1980. The name Vaahteraliiga ("Maple League") comes from the name of the championship trophy Vaahteramalja ("Maple Bowl"), which was donated to the newly formed association by the embassy of Canada in Finland. Vaahteraliiga is managed by American Football Association of Finland – SAJL. It is government approved non-profit organization governing both American football and flag football activities in Finland.

The most successful team all-time are the Helsinki Roosters with a total of 17 championships, including a then-record six consecutive first-place finishes from 1995-2000. This record was tied by Porvoo Butchers as they also won six consecutive championships between 2005 and 2010. In the early years Helsinki and it surrounding towns were loaded with Maple League teams and they seemed to almost monopolize the championship. The first team outside the Helsinki metropolitan area to win the championship were the Seinäjoki Crocodiles in 2001, ending the 21-year Helsinki area supremacy. Since then, however, those teams have only won the championship twice. Turku Trojans have the most Maple Bowl losses. Having qualified for the game ten times, their only win is from their last visit in 2003.

The 2016 season of Vaahteraliiga was planned to see 8 teams competing, as Tampere Saints and Wasa Royals were promoted from 1st Division. Helsinki 69ers did not start the season, so the 2016 season had 7 teams. The 2017 season also has 7 teams, as TAFT was relegated after finishing last, and I-division winner Hämeenlinna Huskies were promoted to Maple League.

== Current teams ==
Team	City
Porvoo Butchers	Porvoo
Seinäjoki Crocodiles	Seinäjoki
East City Giants	Helsinki
Helsinki Roosters	Helsinki
Wasa Royals	Vaasa
Tampere Saints	Tampere
Kuopio Steelers	Kuopio

Updated for 2026 season.

== League license ==
Vaahteraliiga has had a different number of teams during its tenure. In recent years the number has been around seven and eight. This is partly because of league license system enforced by SAJL. In addition to competitive status teams have to reach certain economical and organisational standards. This in turn means that at the end of each season it cannot be said to a certainty which teams will eventually play in the league the next year as teams need to apply for the license. SAJL checks the applications and grants licenses to maximum eight teams according to their seed in the previous season. Teams from the 1st division title game, Spaghetti Bowl, are the only division teams eligible to apply for the license.

The system was put in place largely to ensure long-term planning and sensible running of clubs. The system has already shown its cruelty as teams with no alarming difficulties in competitiveness have been relegated due to lack of management and/or economical difficulties.

== Playing format ==
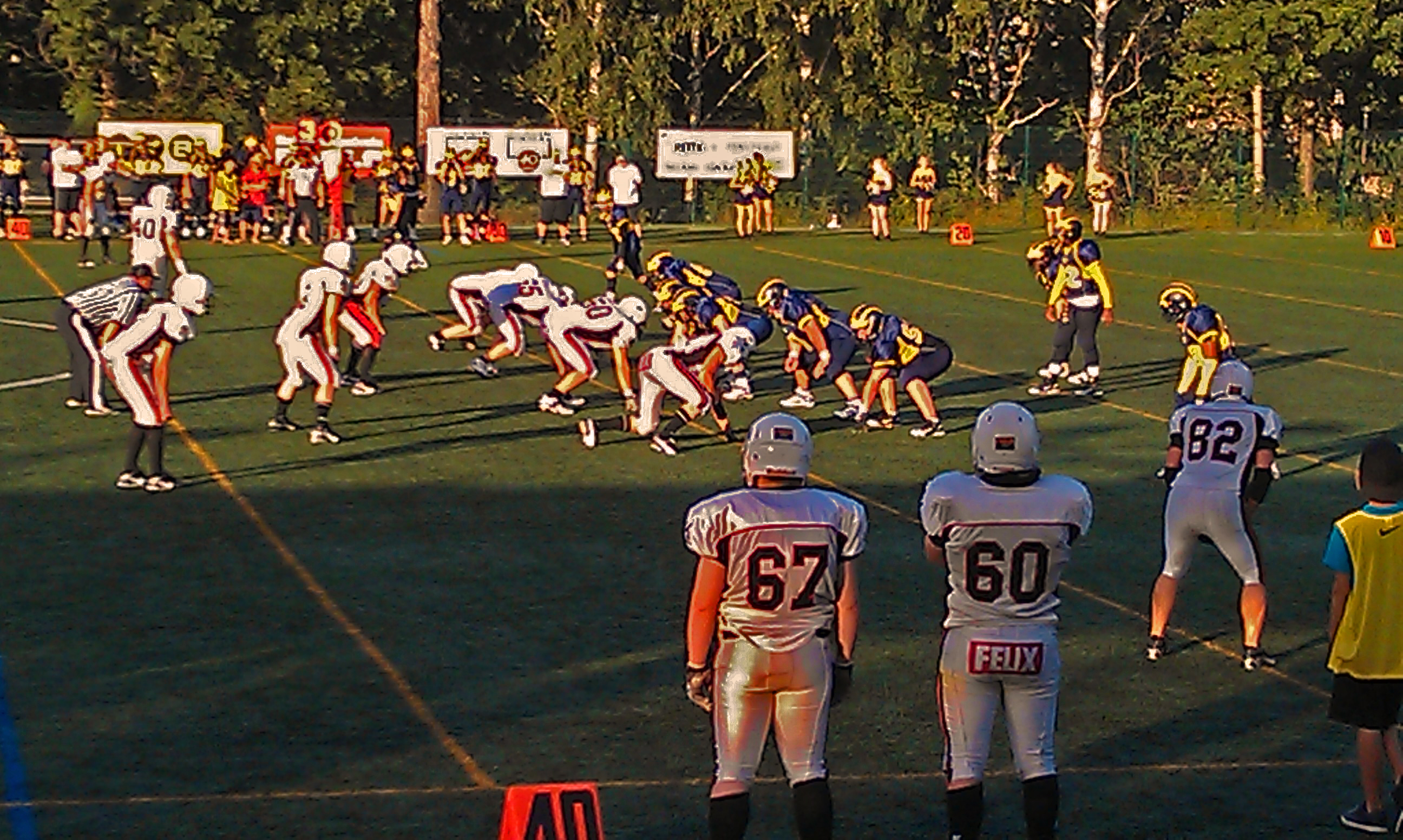
Helsinki Wolverines (blue) against Turku Trojans (white)

=== Regular season ===
League schedule is highly dependent on the number of teams. During seasons of eight teams teams are divided into two pools. Teams play against the teams in the same pool twice, home and away, and teams from the other pool once so that each team has ten games, five home and five away. Despite the pools teams are considered as one conference and they are seeded in one conference.

In a seven-team league teams face each team twice, home and away, with a total of 12 games.

=== Postseason ===
After the regular season the four best teams advance to the post season with seed #1 facing #4 and #2 facing #3 in a single-game play-off. Winners will play in the Maple Bowl for the national title. As of 2006, there hasn't been a game for the bronze medal; they are simply awarded to the losing team of the semi-finals with better seed.

== Champions ==
- 1980 – Poli, Espoo
- 1981 – Majs, Helsinki
- 1982 – Helsinki Roosters
- 1983 – Helsinki Roosters
- 1984 – Helsinki East City Giants
- 1985 – Vantaa TAFT
- 1986 – Helsinki Roosters
- 1987 – Helsinki Roosters
- 1988 – Helsinki Roosters
- 1989 – Munkka Colts
- 1990 – Helsinki Roosters
- 1991 – Helsinki East City Giants
- 1992 – Helsinki East City Giants
- 1993 – Helsinki East City Giants
- 1994 – Helsinki East City Giants
- 1995 – Helsinki Roosters
- 1996 – Helsinki Roosters
- 1997 – Helsinki Roosters
- 1998 – Helsinki Roosters
- 1999 – Helsinki Roosters
- 2000 – Helsinki Roosters
- 2001 – Seinäjoki Crocodiles
- 2002 – Helsinki Roosters
- 2003 – Turku Trojans
- 2004 – Helsinki Roosters
- 2005 – Porvoo Butchers
- 2006 – Porvoo Butchers
- 2007 – Porvoo Butchers
- 2008 – Porvoo Butchers
- 2009 – Porvoo Butchers
- 2010 – Porvoo Butchers
- 2011 – Helsinki Wolverines
- 2012 – Helsinki Roosters
- 2013 – Helsinki Roosters
- 2014 – Helsinki Roosters
- 2015 – Helsinki Roosters
- 2016 – Helsinki Roosters
- 2017 – Helsinki Roosters
- 2018 – Helsinki Roosters
- 2019 – Helsinki Roosters
- 2020 – Kuopio Steelers
- 2021 – Kuopio Steelers
- 2022 – Kuopio Steelers
- 2023 – Porvoo Butchers
- 2024 – Helsinki Roosters
- 2025 – Porvoo Butchers
- 2026 – Seinäjoki Crocodiles
