= Porvoo Butchers =

American football team from Porvoo, Finland

- 2023 season|Current season
Uniforms

General information
- Founded: 1986
- Stadium: Porvoo Central Field
- Headquartered: Porvoo, Finland
- Colours: Black, Yellow
- Website: Butchers.fi

Personnel
- Head coach: Markku Vuoksenturja

Nickname
- Butchers

League / conference affiliations
- Suomen Amerikkalaisen Jalkapallon Liitto; Finland Maple League

Championships
- Finnish Maple League wins: 8; 2005, 2006, 2007, 2008, 2009, 2010, 2023, 2025

The Porvoo Butchers are an American football team from Porvoo, Finland. The team plays in the Finnish Maple League. The club's home field is Porvoo Central Field.

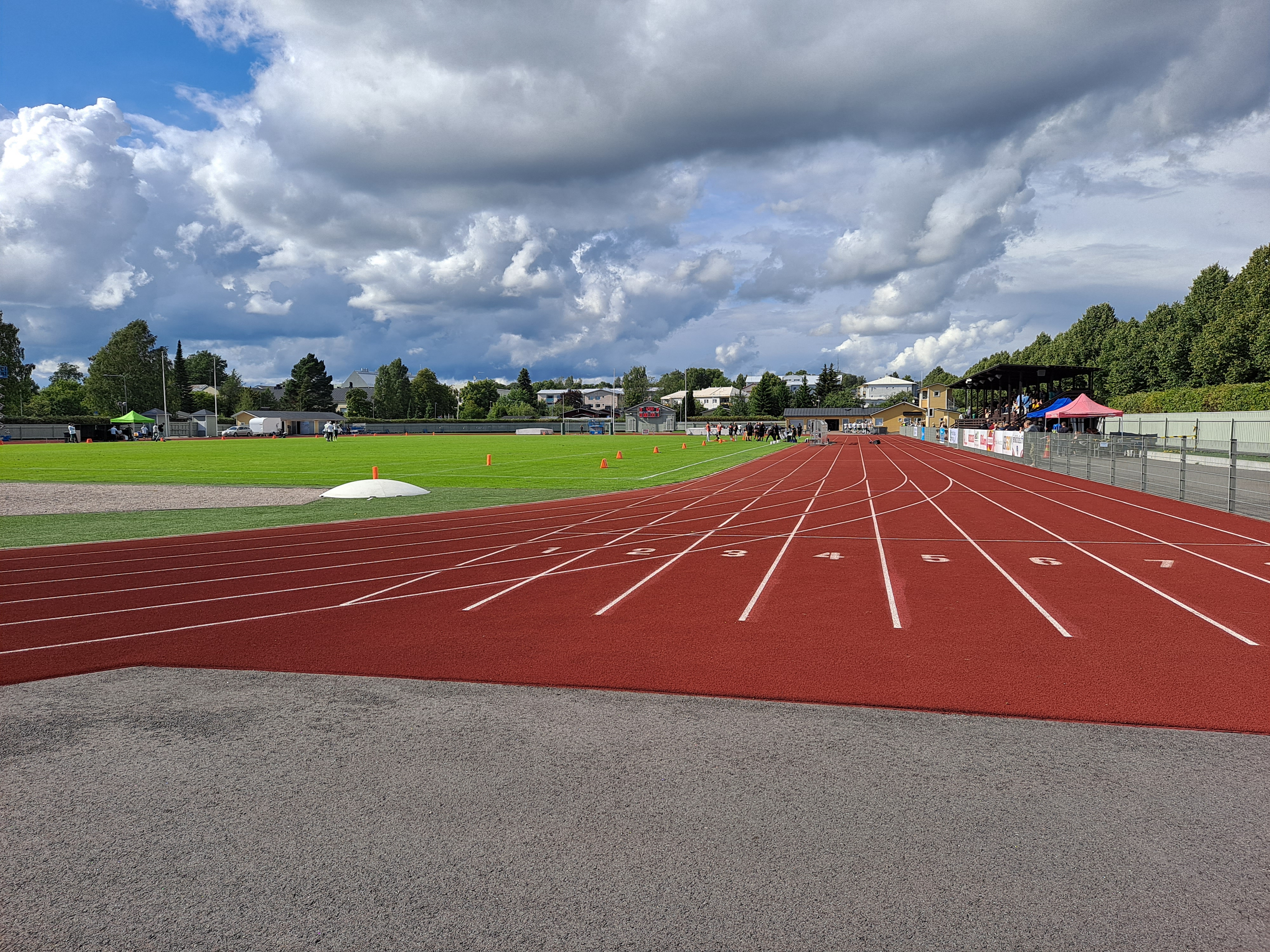
Porvoo Central Field

The team was founded on September 13, 1986. The team won the Finnish Maple League six times in a row between 2005 and 2010, after which the seventh victory did not occur until 2023. The club also has junior teams for ages 10–21, as well as a novice women's team.

== Team roster (2025) ==
Below is a list of the 2025 roster:

=== Staff ===
- Finland # Markku Vuoksenturja (head coach)
- Finland # Lasse Voipio (assistant coach)
- USA # Robert Johnson (assistant coach)
- Finland # Pasi Lautala (assistant coach)
- Finland # Juha Lampinen (assistant coach)
- Finland # Marko Luoma (assistant coach)
- Finland # Mikko Vento (assistant coach)

=== QB ===
- USA # Christian Arrambide
- Finland # Jesper Korkalainen

=== RB ===
- Finland # Michael Fiskari
- USA # Christian Powell
- Finland # Aleksi Hirvonen
- Finland # Hugo Vähäkuopus

=== WR ===
- Finland # Micky Kyei
- Finland # Phung Nguyen
- Finland # Luukas Eerola
- Finland # Mikko Seppänen
- Finland # Amjad Al-Rubaye
- Finland # Zacharias Karbin
- Finland # Niko Kantonen
- USA # Nathaniel Robitaille

=== TE ===
- Finland # Asko Mäntymäki

=== OL ===
- Finland # Sauli Puustinen
- Finland # Jari Mononen
- Finland # Emil Vento
- Finland # Joe Siiskonen
- Finland # Tomi Pirkola
- Finland # Sakari Siltakorpi
- Finland # Oskari Vattu
- USA # John Paul Flores
- Finland # Mikael Mörne

=== DL ===
- Finland # Justus Asovaara
- Finland # Jesse Vuoksenturja
- Finland # Joonatan Asovaara
- Finland # Samuel Komu
- Finland # Joonas Puranen
- Finland # Noah Nettey
- Finland # Roni Paananen
- Finland # Julius Vuoksenturja
- Finland # Juuso Salo
- Finland # Atro Heinonen

=== LB ===
- Finland # Niko Roiko
- Finland # Ukko Pakkanen
- USA # Jalen Todd
- Finland # Janne Lahikainen
- Finland # Jussi Mäkelä

=== DB ===
- USA # Zach Wright
- Finland # Jose Penesumbu
- Finland # Juuso Halonen
- Finland # Venny Koskelainen
- Finland # Jere Paananen
- Finland # Aaro Piispanen
- USA # Curtis Slater

=== K ===
- Finland # Lassi Minkkinen

== See also ==
- Helsinki Roosters
- Kuopio Steelers
- Seinäjoki Crocodiles
- Tampere Saints
