= Turku Trojans =

American football team in Turku, Finland

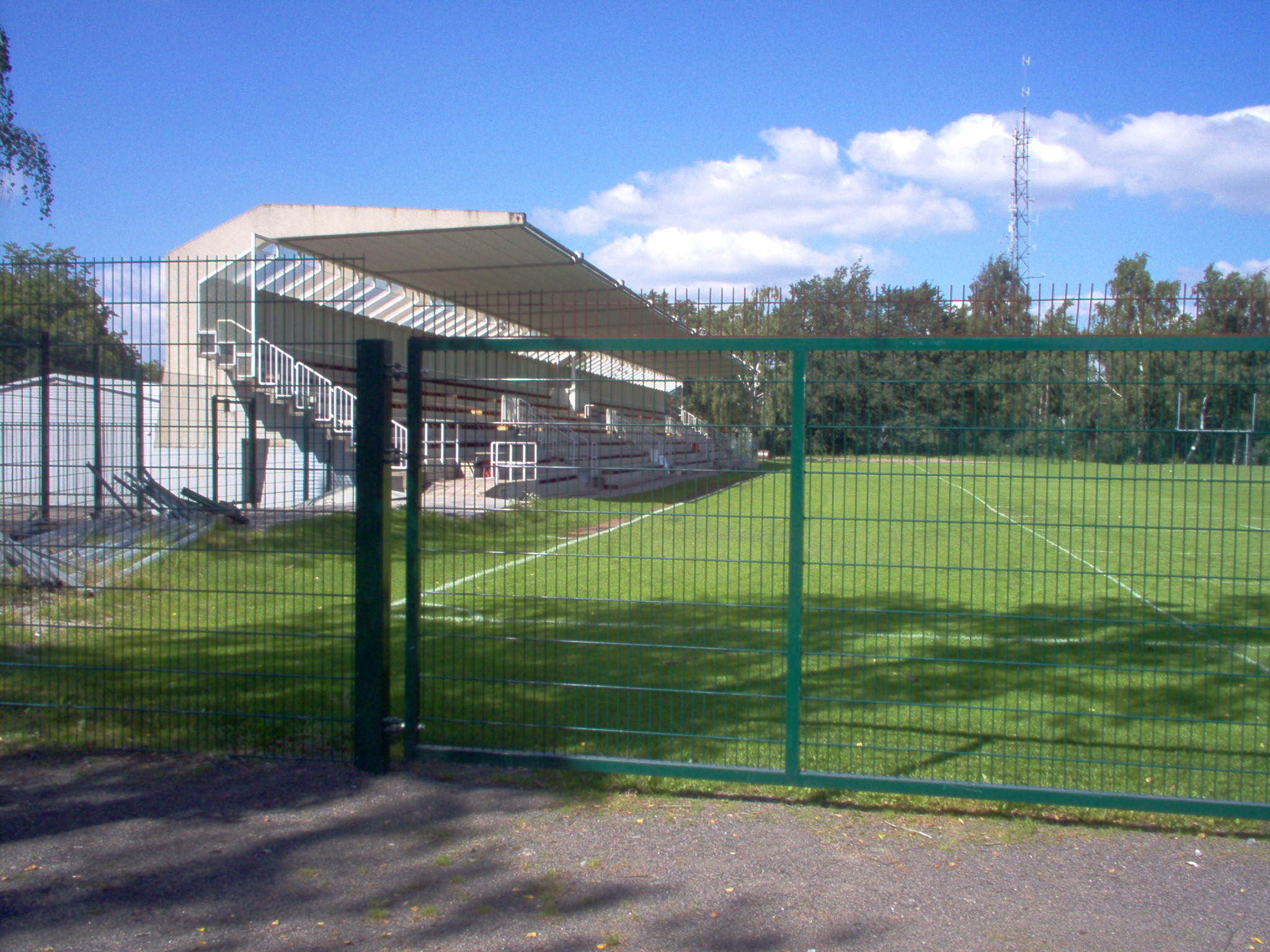
Turun Ylakentta

Turku Trojans is one of the oldest American football teams in Finland, established in 1982. Turku Trojans in 2026 play in Division 1 (Tier 2). The Trojans previously have played in the Maple League Vaahteraliiga (highest level) in Finland operated by American Football Association of Finland. Turku Trojans was also the first to introduce cheerleading to Finland in 1983.

The Trojans are Finnish champions in 2003. Maple Bowl championship game appearances in 1984, 1987, 1992, 1993, 1994, 1998, 1999, 2002, 2004 and 2014. Third place in 1991, 1997, 2000, 2001, 2015 and 2016.

== History ==
Since the founding of the Turku Trojans, the team played 31 consecutive seasons in the Maple League. After the 2012 season the Trojans decided to voluntarily drop one level down and play the next season in Division 1 (2nd tier league below Maple League). In 2013, the Trojans won all the regular season games, the semifinal game and the Spaghetti Bowl. After a perfect season the Trojans was granted a Maple League Vaahteraliiga license and rose again to the highest level. After the 2017 season the team folded and started rebuilding from the Division 2 (Tier 3) in 2019. The Trojans were promoted to Division 1 in 2026.

Former Trojans head coach in 1993–1994 Ken Meyer is the most accomplished Trojans alumni having coached many years in the NFL and top college level in USA before coming to Finland. Meyer also led the Finland national American football team to win the European championship in the 1990's. Notable players in Turku Trojans are Aki Jones and Robert Johnson.
