= Helsinki Wolverines =

American football team from Helsinki, Finland

- Logo
- Uniforms

General information
- Founded: 1995
- Stadium: Helsinki Velodrome
- Headquartered: Helsinki, Finland
- Website: helsinkiwolverines.com

Personnel
- Head coach: (Finland) Pekka Lamminsalo

League / conference affiliations
- Vaahteraliiga

Championships
- League championships: 0; 1 title (2011)

The Helsinki Wolverines are a Finnish American football club based in Helsinki and was founded in 1995. The clubs Top Men's Team plays in the Vaahteraliiga of the American Football Association of Finland which is the highest ranking level of American football in all of Finland. The league in Finland was established in 1980.

== History ==
Helsinki Wolverines was founded on 10 October 1995. The team played its first official game in 1996 season of 2nd Division, a third tier american football league in Finland, against the Lahti Jets. The first Wolverines team was mainly made up of former Helsinki Whips players and the first head coach was Jimmy Lawson. In five seasons Wolverines rose from 2nd Division to Vaahteraliiga, the top american football league in Finland. The Wolverines have strong rivalry with other teams from Helsinki: the Roosters and the 69ers. The Wolverines chose their colors, maize and blue, as an homage to the Michigan Wolverines of the University of Michigan.

Helsinki Wolverines took their only Vaahteraliiga (Maple League) title so far in 2011, when they beat Seinäjoki Crocodiles on Sonera Stadium in a close match by a score of 30–27. Stephen Stokes from Wolverines was chosen as the Most Valuable Player of the final.

== Club structure ==
Wolverines' Men's first team plays in Vaahteraliiga (Maple League), the premier league of american football in Finland. Men's second team, Wolverines II, plays in 2nd Division, a third tier league. Men's third team plays in 4th Division, a fifth tier league. Wolverines also have 5 boys' youth teams: U20, U17, U15, U13 and U11.

Women's first team was founded again in 2014 after years of inactivity. The team participates in Women's Finnish Championship Series (Maple League) and has recently won 4 consecutive titles in 2017, 2018, 2019 and 2020. The club also has two cheerleading teams.

== Season by season ==
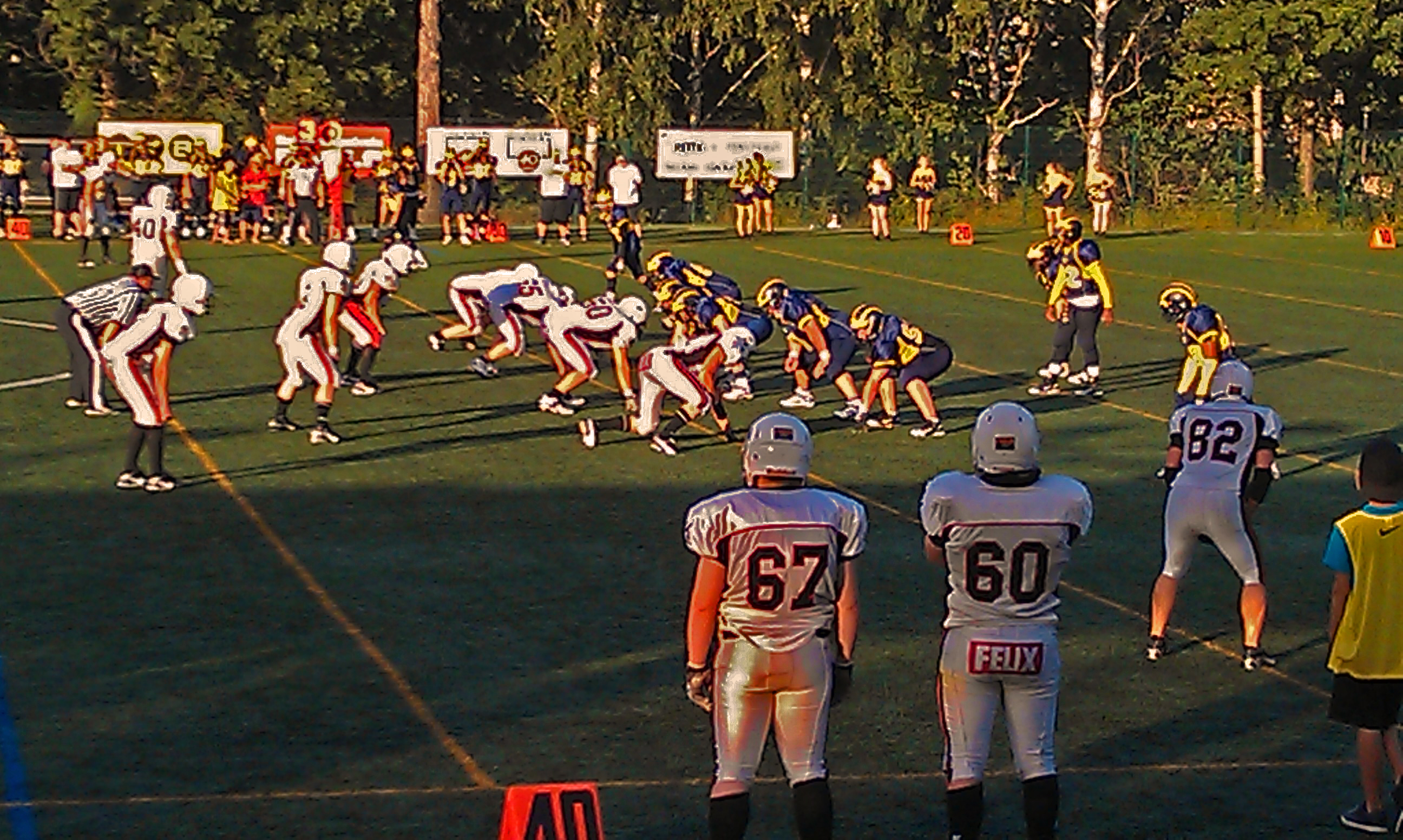
Helsinki Wolverines faced Turku Trojans in Vaahteraliiga 2011 season.

Season	League	Tier	Final position
1996	2nd Division	III	4th*
1997	1st Division	II	7th
1998	1st Division	II	4th
1999	1st Division	II	2nd
2000	1st Division	II	1st*
2001	Vaahteraliiga	I	5th
2002	Vaahteraliiga	I	7th
2003	Vaahteraliiga	I	8th
2004	Vaahteraliiga	I	8th
2005	Vaahteraliiga	I	5th
2006	Vaahteraliiga	I	2nd
2007	Vaahteraliiga	I	4th
2008	Vaahteraliiga	I	4th
2009	Vaahteraliiga	I	6th
2010	Vaahteraliiga	I	3rd
2011	Vaahteraliiga	I	1st
2012	Vaahteraliiga	I	2nd
2013	Vaahteraliiga	I	2nd
2014	Vaahteraliiga	I	7th
2015	1st Division	II	4th
2016	1st Division	II	2nd
2017	1st Division	II	2nd
2018	1st Division	II	1st*
2019	Vaahteraliiga	I	3rd
2020	Vaahteraliiga	I	2nd
2021	Vaahteraliiga	I	5th
2022	Vaahteraliiga	I	3rd

* denotes promotion
Updated as of season 2020.

== See also ==
- Helsinki 69ers
- Helsinki Roosters
