= Seinäjoki Crocodiles =

American football team from Seinäjoki, Finland

- Current season
- Logo
- Uniforms

General information
- Founded: 1987
- Stadium: Wirokit stadium
- Headquartered: Seinäjoki, Finland
- Colours: Green, White
- Mascot: Crocodile
- Website: Crocodiles.fi

Personnel
- Head coach: Jaime Hill

Nickname
- Crocs

League / conference affiliations
- Suomen Amerikkalaisen Jalkapallon Liitto; Finland Maple League, European 1st Division

Championships
- Finnish Maple League wins: 2; 2001, 2026

The Seinäjoki Crocodiles are an American football team from Seinäjoki, Finland. The team plays in the Finnish Maple League and it has also played in the European Football League. The Crocodiles are one of the top teams in Finland.

== Accomplishments ==
- 1996 – 3rd place
- 2000 – 2nd place
- 2001 – 1st place Maple League National Champions
- 2002 – 3rd place
- 2004 – 3rd place
- 2005 – 2nd place
- 2006 – 3rd place
- 2007 – 2nd place
- 2009 – 3rd place
- 2010 – 2nd place
- 2011 – 2nd place
- 2012 – 3rd place
- 2013 – 3rd place
- 2014 – 3rd place
- 2015 – 2nd place
- 2016 – 2nd place
- 2022 - 2nd place
- 2023 - 2nd place
- 2024 - 2nd place
- 2025 - 2nd place
- 2026 – 1st place Maple League National Champions

== Team roster ==
#	Name	Position	Height (Cm)	Weight (Kg)	YOB	Nationality
0	Koivumaki J	0	0	0	0	0
0	Jaakkola J	0	0	0	0	0
0	Natri T	0	0	0	0	0
2	Yiminiy Kevin Paul	WR	178	95	1992	UK
0	Andrushko Justin	RB	177	85	1988	ITA
5	Raatikainen Pasi	WR	188	88	1995	FIN
6	Arrivey Brett	QB	188	100	1994	USA
7	Koivumäki Jussi	LB	180	100	1993	FIN
8	Washington Dijon	DB	184	90	1992	FIN
10	Koivumäki Marco	RB	170	80	1996	FIN
11	Rajamäki Vili	WR	178	82	1995	FIN
12	Kaleva Joonas	DB	178	74	1998	FIN
13	Brooks Anthony	WR	176	84	1994	UK
15	Magwood Cory	LB	189	108	1995	USA
18	N'twa Felix	DL	190	119	1992	AUT
18	Yli-Kujala Aleksi	DL	198	90	1998	FIN
22	Havulehto Mikko	DB	179	80	1995	FIN
25	Clarke Josh	RB	172	80	1992	UK
26	Leinonen Tuomas	DB	179	82	1979	FIN
29	Huhtala Iiro	DB	182	78	1997	FIN
32	Alarinta Eero	LB	182	93	1997	FIN
33	Luuri Juha	LB	185	90	1996	FIN
34	Värinen Jaska	RB	185	87	1995	FIN
38	Raatikainen Joonas	LB	185	101	1991	FIN
42	Hietala Timi	RB	178	95	1999	FIN
43	Koivumäki Juhani	DB	178	101	1991	FIN
45	Koivumäki Jani-Petteri	LB	184	90	1985	FIN
46	Saarimäki Tuomas	LB	180	88	1993	FIN
53	Jackson George	OL	188	130	1991	DEU
61	Kanerva Juuso	DL	186	105	1996	FIN
65	Malander Maximilliam	OL	197	125	1993	SWE
66	Paloniemi Mikael	OL	185	122	1990	FIN
69	Jaakkola Henri	DL	188	135	1984	FIN
70	Ristolainen Jukka	OL	178	110	1996	FIN
78	Rinta-aho Antti	OL	187	125	1994	FIN
79	Pöntinen Kari	OL	175	105	1988	FIN
87	Kaunismäki Miikka	TE	188	97	1998	FIN
92	Saarimaa Hannu	DL	193	123	1989	FIN
99	Zacok Filip	DL	195	120	1997	FIN
0	Renaldas Macevicius	DL	0	0	1990	DEU
0	0	0	0	0	0	0
0	0	0	0	0	0	0
0	0	0	0	0	0	0
0	0	0	0	0	0	0
0	0	0	0	0	0	0
0	0	0	0	0	0	0

Staff:

Head coach

- Vesa Jalava

Assistant coaches

- Janne Pisto
- Mikko Rissanen
- Esa Katila
- Teemu Ivalo
- Ville Nevalainen

Huolto: Matti Kivimäki Risto Ranta Kimmo Kuvaja Heljä Kivimäki Marko Kallio

The Crocodiles also has second team called Gators. The team has several youth teams and a number of cheerleading groups.

== See also ==
- Helsinki Roosters
- Kuopio Steelers
- Porvoo Butchers
- Tampere Saints
- Turku Trojans
