= Helsinki Roosters =

American football team from Helsinki, Finland

- Logo
- Uniforms

General information
- Founded: 1979
- Stadium: Helsinki Velodrome
- Headquartered: Helsinki, Finland
- Colors

Personnel
- Head coach: (Finland) Juha Hakala

League / conference affiliations
- Vaahteraliiga

Championships
- League championships: 0; 23 Vaahteraliiga titles 1 Eurobowl title 1 Champions League title

The Helsinki Roosters are an American football team based in Helsinki, Finland established in 1979. The team plays in the Vaahteraliiga Maple League (the highest level of American football in Finland) and their home field is the Helsinki Velodrome.

== History ==
Roosters were founded in 1979 and the club is a founding member of the American Football Association of Finland (SAJL). The team has played in every season of the Vaahteraliiga and has only been left out of the playoffs twice. The Roosters have won the regular season 11 times and have gone the whole season unbeaten for five times (in 1983, 1988, 1999, 2002 and 2013). They also have friendly rivalry with local Helsinki Wolverines and Helsinki 69ers.

Roosters have also been successful in international competitions. In 1988 they won the Eurobowl II in London, where the Roosters beat Amsterdam Crusaders 35–14. In 1989 Roosters came third-placed. In 1994, Roosters took part in the Football League of Europe. Roosters participated in the European Club Championship European Football League in 1996, 1997, 1998 and 1999. Roosters tour yearly to play international friendlies and were the first Finnish team ever to play in United States in 1985.

Roosters won the first IFAF Europe Champions League in 2014. They beat Vukovi Beograd 36–29 in the final, held in Elancourt, France.

== Honours ==
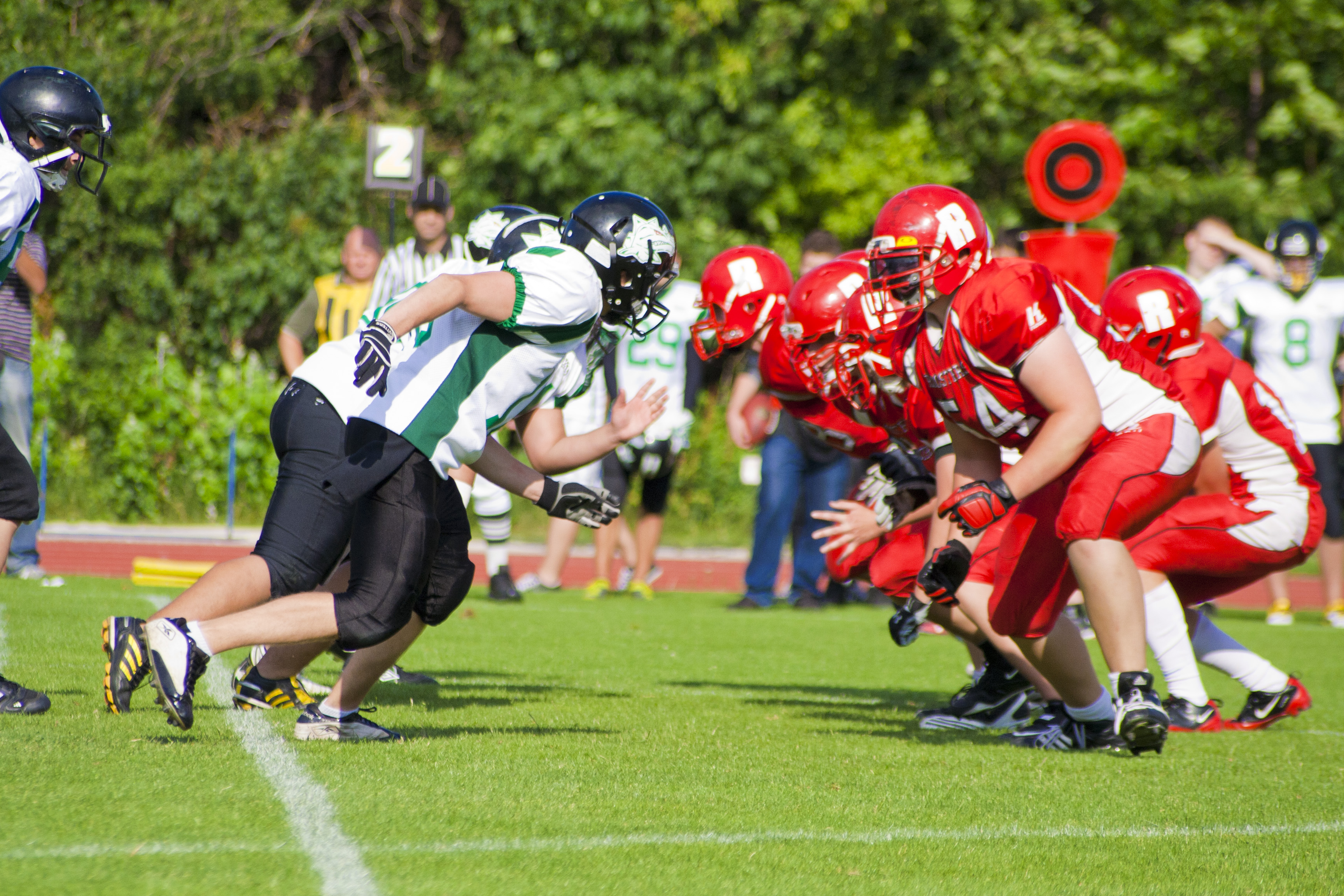
Helsinki Roosters U17 faced Danube Dragons U17 team from Austria in 2011.

=== Men ===
- Vaahteraliiga championship titles: 23
  - 1982, 1983, 1986–1988, 1990, 1995–2000, 2002, 2004, 2012–2019, 2024
- Eurobowl titles: 1
  - 1988
- IFAF European Champions League titles: 1
  - 2014
- IFAF Northern European Football League titles: 1
  - 2017

=== Women ===
- Finnish championship titles: 1
  - 2011

=== Notable players ===
- (United States) Robert Johnson League MVP from Texas Tech.
- (United States) Sonté Wong (WR)
- (Finland) Tuomas Kivisaari
- (Finland) Iiro Luoto
- (Finland) Roope Noronen
- (Finland) Petrus Penkki
- (Finland) Michael Quarshie
- (United States) Josh Hollingsworth
- (Finland) Matias Sarvela
- (Canada) Brad Tayles
- (United States) Mike Kane Running back for Roosters- 1988 Eurobowl Champions
- (United States) Tim Johnson (American football coach) Import player in mid to late 1980's
- (United States) Jaycen Spears (RB) League MVP. Purdue University
- (United States) Scooter Molander QB 1997-1998
- (United States) Brandon Connette QB from Duke University.

== Club structure ==
The Roosters men's first team plays in Vaahteraliiga, the top American football league in Finland. Roosters also have 5 boys' youth teams: U20, U17, U15, U13 and U9.

Rooster Ladies, the women's first team plays in Finnish championship series, the highest tier of American football for women in Finland. The women's team played semi-contact football before, but from 2008 onwards they have played 9-vs-9 full contact football. Roosters have one girls' youth team: U20.

== See also ==
- Helsinki 69ers
- Helsinki Wolverines
