= Berg (surname) =

Berg is a surname of North-European origin. In several Germanic languages (e.g. German, Dutch, Norwegian, and Swedish [Danish: Bjerg]), the word means "mount", "mountain", or "cliff".

== Notable people sharing the surname "Berg" ==
=== In music ===
- Alban Berg (1885–1935), Austrian composer
- Andrea Berg, German singer
- Bill Berg (musician), American drummer
- Bob Berg (1951–2002), American jazz saxophonist
- Cia Berg (born 1963), Swedish singer and television presenter
- Cy Berg, vaudeville performer and the "Berg" in the group Witt and Berg
- Else Berg (1877–1942), Dutch painter
- Emil Berg, Swedish singer
- Espen Berg (born 1983), Norwegian jazz pianist and composer
- Gunnar Berg (composer) (1909–1989), Swiss-born Danish composer
- Joakim Berg (born 1970), lead singer of the Swedish band Kent
- Karin Berg (1936–2006), American music executive
- Lillie Berg (1845–1896), American musician, musical educator
- Moe Berg (musician) (born 1959), Canadian singer-songwriter
- Robbie Berg, American musician and member of The Fab Four
- Shelly Berg (born 1955), American jazz pianist and educator
- Yung Berg (born 1985), American rapper

=== In media and the arts ===
- A. Scott Berg (born 1949), American biographer
- Adam Berg (director) (born 1972), Swedish music video director, brother of Joakim Berg
- Alan Berg (1934–1984), American talk radio host
- Alec Berg, American television writer
- Amy Berg (writer), American screenwriter
- Bengt Berg (born 1946), Swedish poet and politician
- Bolette Berg (1872–1944), Norwegian photographer
- Carol Berg (born 1948), American fantasy writer
- Dave Berg (cartoonist) (1920–2002), American cartoonist for MAD
- Dick Berg (1922–2009), American screenwriter and producer
- Elizabeth Berg (author) (born 1948), American novelist
- Gertrude Berg (1894–1966), American radio and television actress
- Gretchen J. Berg, American television producer
- Gunnar Berg (painter) (1863–1893), Norwegian painter
- Guri Berg (born 1963), Norwegian sculptor
- John Berg (actor) (1949–2007), American actor
- John Berg (art director), (1932–2015), American art director
- Lene Berg, (born 1965), Norwegian film director
- Mary Berg, Canadian chef and television personality
- Nancy Berg (1931–2022), American model and actress
- Peter Berg, American actor, film director, producer and writer
- S. Berg, pseudonym of Clementine Cohn (born 1861)

=== In politics and religion ===
- Axel Berg (born 1959), German politician
- Bill Berg (politician) (1939–1967), Royal Canadian Mounted police man
- Bruno II von Berg (c. 1100–1137), Archbishop of Cologne
- Charles A. Berg (1927–2014), American farmer and politician
- David Berg (1919–1994), founder of the religious movement Children of God
- Delmer Berg (1915–2016), American member of the Abraham Lincoln Brigade during the Spanish Civil War; labor union activist
- Eivinn Berg (1931–2013), Norwegian diplomat and politician
- Friedrich Wilhelm Rembert von Berg (1793–1874), Russian statesman and military figure
- Gordon Berg (1927–2013), American farmer and politician
- Gunnar Berg (politician) (1923–2007), Liberal Party politician
- Gunner Berg, Norwegian priest, writer and politician
- Harry Berg (1943–2020), American politician and educator
- Herbert Berg (religion), religious studies professor at the University of North Carolina
- Hermann Berg (1905–1982), German politician
- John Berg (priest) (born 1970), American Catholic cleric
- Jónína Kristín Berg (born 1962), Icelandic neopagan leader, art teacher and aromatherapist
- Julius S. Berg (1893–1938), New York politician
- Kim Berg (born 1974), Finnish politician
- Lars Patrick Berg (born 1966), German politician
- Michael Berg (activist) (born 1945), politician and anti-war activist, father of Nick Berg
- Philip Berg (1927–2013), founder of the Kabbalah Centre
- Philip J. Berg (born 1944), activist and former deputy attorney general of Pennsylvania
- Mike Berg, American politician
- Moe Berg (1902–1972), U.S. baseball player and spy
- Nick Berg (1978–2004), American businessman beheaded in Iraq
- Ove H. Berg (1840–1922), American politician
- Stephen Jay Berg (born 1951), American Catholic bishop
- Thomas K. Berg (born 1940), American lawyer and politician

=== In science, medicine and technology ===
- Carlos Berg (1843–1903), Latvian-born Argentine naturalist and entomologist
- Christine Berg, American radiation oncologist and physician-scientist
- Gabriele Berg (born 1963), German biologist and ecologist
- Jeremy M. Berg, the director of the National Institute of General Medical Sciences
- Lev Berg (1876–1950), biologist and geographer
- Max Berg (1870–1947), German architect and urban planner
- Nathaniel Berg, president of the Guam medical society
- Otto Berg (scientist) (1874–1939), German chemist, co-discoverer of the element rhenium
- Otto Karl Berg (1815–1866), German botanist and pharmacist
- Paul Berg (1926–2023), American biochemist
- Raissa L. Berg (1913–2006), Russian geneticist and evolutionary biologist

=== In sport ===
- Aki-Petteri Berg (born 1977), Finnish ice hockey player
- Allen Berg (born 1961), Canadian racing driver
- Andrea Berg (volleyball) (born 1981), German volleyball player
- Axel Berg (footballer) (1938–2020), Norwegian footballer, brother of Jan Berg (footballer born 1943)
- Bill Berg (ice hockey) (born 1967), Canadian ice hockey player
- Dave Berg (infielder) (born 1970), retired Major League Baseball player
- Esmé Emmanuel Berg (born 1947), South African tennis player
- Grégoire Berg (1896–1944), French footballer
- Haley Lanier Berg (born 1998), American soccer player
- Henning Berg (born 1969), Norwegian football player
- Herbert Berg (bobsleigh), German bobsledder
- Jan Berg (footballer born 1943) (1943–2005), Norwegian footballer
- Jan Berg (footballer born 1965), Norwegian footballer
- Jan Berg (Finnish footballer) (born 1985)
- Justin Berg (born 1984), Major League Baseball player
- Lindsey Berg (born 1980), American volleyball player
- Marcus Berg (born 1986), Swedish football player
- Moe Berg (1902–1972), American baseball player and spy
- Nella Berg (born 2005), Finnish ice hockey player
- Odd Berg (footballer) (born 1952), Norwegian footballer, brother of Jan Berg (footballer born 1965)
- Odd Berg (cyclist) (1923–2021), Norwegian cyclist
- Otto Berg (athlete) (1906–1991), Norwegian long jumper
- Patrick Berg (born 1997), Norwegian footballer
- Patty Berg (1918–2006), American golfer
- Per Berg (born 1961), Danish curler
- Rainer Berg (born 1965), German footballer
- Viktor Berg (born 1977), Canadian squash player
- Wilma van den Berg (born 1947), Dutch sprinter

=== In other fields ===
- Bryan Berg (born 1975) professional cardstacker
- Gunnar Berg (Scouting) (1897–1987), Norwegian American director of the Boy Scouts of America
- Odd Berg (ship-owner born 1894) (1894–1973), Norwegian ship-owner
- Odd Berg (ship-owner born 1907) (1907–2005), Norwegian ship-owner
- Paavo Berg (1911–1941), Finnish fighter ace
- Richard Berg, wargame designer

== See also ==
- General Berg (disambiguation)
- von Berg
- Van den Berg
- Berg (disambiguation)
