= Jan Berg =

Jan Berg may refer to:

- Jan Berg (politician) (1941–2020), Norwegian politician
- Jan Berg (footballer, born 1943) (1943–2005), Norwegian footballer who played for FK Lyn
- Jan Berg (footballer, born 1965), Norwegian footballer who played for Molde FK
- Jan Berg (Finnish footballer) (born 1985), Finnish footballer

== See also ==
- John Berg (disambiguation)
- Berg (surname)
