= Trygve de Lange =

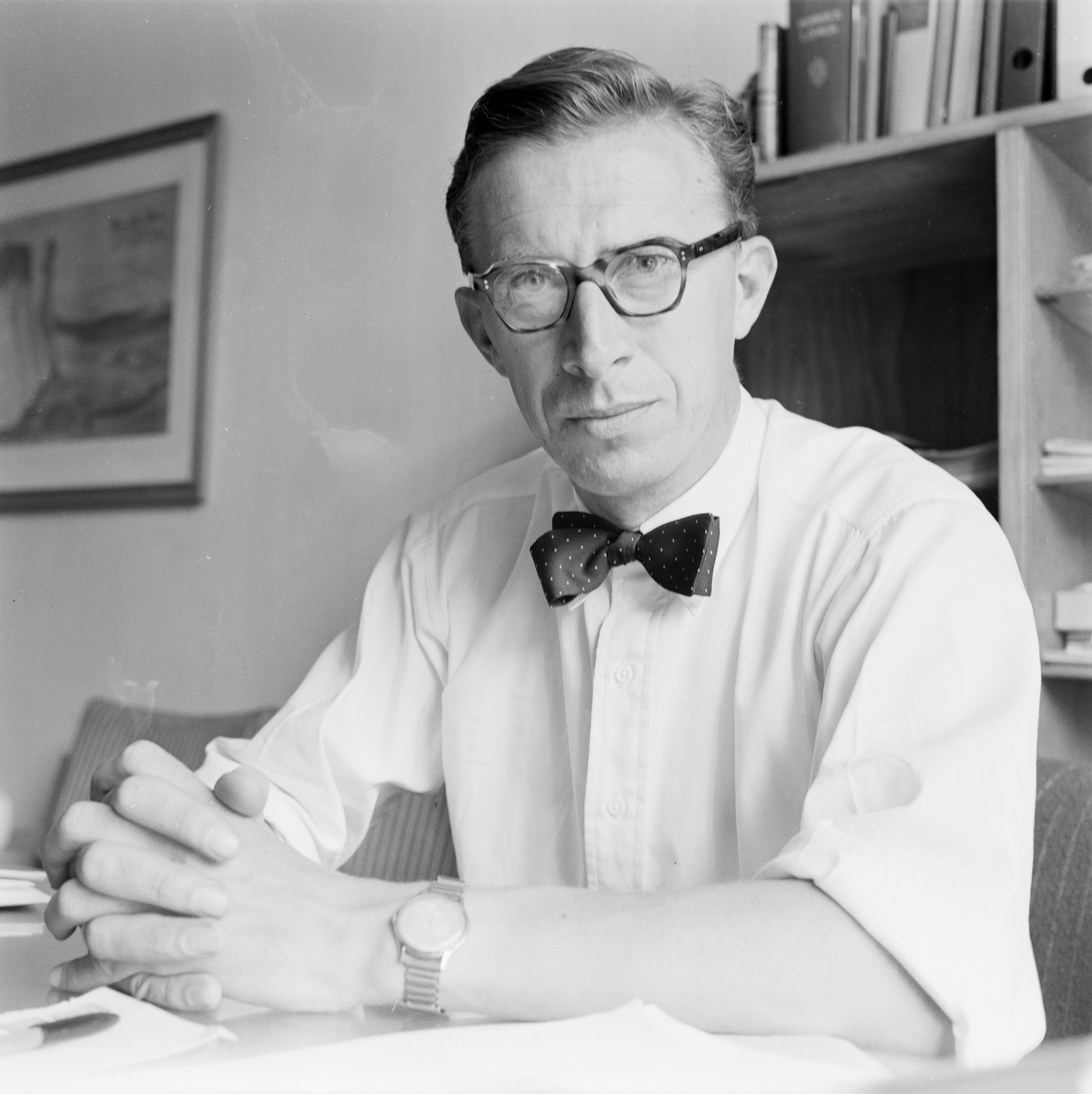
Trygve de Lange

Trygve de Lange (3 September 1918 – 12 February 1981) was a Norwegian lawyer and secretary-general of Libertas.

He was born in Kristiania, took his examen artium in 1937 and the cand.jur. degree at the University of Oslo in 1941. He edited the periodical Minerva from 1938 to 1939, and was deputy chair of the Norwegian Students' Society in 1940. In 1942 he married Lulla Bagn (1918–2003). After World War II he opened a lawyer's office.

When Libertas was founded to promote libertarian ideas after World War 2 in order to counteract the social democratic tendency of the time, de Lange was hired as the first secretary-general.

In 1955, de Lange was hired part-time as finance secretary in the Conservative Party by the party's general secretary, Leif Helberg. John Lyng belonged to those who wanted de Lange as general secretary of the Conservative Party, while primarily C.J. Hambro and Alv Kjøs provided for the final break with Libertas around 1960. The beginning of this settlement was Liberta's launch of the program "Will to power", where it was proposed to give young, talented politicians positions in business, so they could get to know business next to his political work. Libertas proposed concrete political programs and alternative state budgets, but was opposed by the Conservatives' central government, which stated that "the independence of the parties is an absolute prerequisite for a clear responsibility in political life." Kjøs believed that Libertas should simply be shut down. Lars Roar Langslet and others in the circle around Minerva criticized market liberalism as such. Libertas was forced to become a pure information organization and refrain from playing in purely political matters, and the Conservatives could more easily cooperate with other bourgeois parties.

De Lange had many supporters, some of whom wanted to recruit him to the leadership of the Conservative Party. As de Lange retired in 1976, Libertas faded into a more obscure existence, and it was disbanded and replaced by Liberalt Forskningsinstitutt in 1988. de Lange returned to the lawyer profession, and died in February 1981 in Oslo.
