= Odd Berg =

Odd Berg may refer to:

- Odd Berg (cyclist) (1923–2021), Norwegian cyclist
- Odd Berg (footballer) (born 1952), Norwegian football coach and former player
- Odd Berg (ship-owner born 1894) (1894–1973), Norwegian ship-owner
- Odd Berg (ship-owner born 1907) (1907–2005), Norwegian ship-owner
