= Bergs =

Bergs is a surname. Notable people with the surname include:

- Arveds Bergs (1875–1941), Latvian lawyer, newspaper editor, and politician
- Frantz Bergs (c. 1697–1787), Swedish goldsmith, father of Julius Marianus Bergs
- Zizou Bergs (born 1999), Belgian tennis player

== See also ==
- Berg (surname)
