= Stiftelsen =

Stiftelsen mean Foundation in Scandinavian languages.

Stiftelsen may refer to:

- Stiftelsen (band), Swedish musical band
- Stiftelsen Det Norske Veritas, also known as DNV, Norwegian society organized as a foundation, with the objective of safeguarding life, property, and the environment
- Stiftelsen Manifest, Norwegian socialist think-tank

== See also ==
- Bank of Sweden Tercentenary Foundation, in Swedish Stiftelsen Riksbankens Jubileumsfond, Swedish foundation which awards grants to individuals and research groups for research projects in science, the humanities, social sciences, medical research, technology, and law.
- Foundation (book series), a famous science fiction series by Isaac Asimov known in Scandinavian languages as Stiftelseserien
