= Kristian Meisingset =

Norwegian editor

Kristian Meisingset (born 9 June 1981) is a Norwegian editor on culture in the conservative quarterly periodical Minerva. He has a master in literature from the University of Oslo, and is now Norwegian language-teacher at Sonans Privatgymnas. Meisingset has been famous for criticising the genre opera for being out-of-date and for being "not able to affect the contemporary society".
