= Karen Berg =

Karen Berg may refer to:

- Karen Berg (writer) (1942–2020), American author and the founder of the Kabbalah Centre International
- Karen Berg (politician) (born 1961), American physician, professor and member of the Kentucky State Senate
- Karen Berg (actress) (1906–1995), Danish actress

See also:

- Karin Berg (1936–2006), American music executive
