= Johannes W. Løvhaug =

Norwegian historian

Johannes Waage Løvhaug (born 1967) is a Norwegian historian and editor-in-chief of the gazette Apollon of the Universitet of Oslo. He is cand.philol with history of ideas as his main interest. He has studied ideological at the Heinrich Heine University of Düsseldorf.

In 2003, he published the book Politikk som idékamp, about the history of the Norwegian conservative periodical Minerva between 1957 and 1972. In this book, he claimed that the community associated with Minerva represented an important counter-weight and middle way between the Marxian movement in AKP(m-l) and the libertarian November associated with the organisation Libertas and the periodical Farmand. The book received mostly good critics by reviewers.
