= John Berg =

John Berg may refer to:

- John Berg (actor) (1949–2007), American actor
- John Berg (art director) (1932–2015), American art director
- John Berg (priest) (born 1970), American Catholic priest

== See also ==
- John (given name)
- Berg (surname)
