= Gunnar Berg =

Gunnar Berg may refer to:

- Gunnar Berg (composer) (1909–1989), Swiss-born Danish composer
- Gunnar Berg (Scouting) (1896–1987), national director of the Boy Scouts of America
- Gunnar Berg (painter) (1863–1893), Norwegian painter
- Gunnar Berg (politician) (1923–2007), Norwegian politician for the Liberal Party
- Gunnar Andreas Berg (born 1954), Norwegian musician and record label owner

== See also ==
- Gunner Berg (1764–1827), Norwegian priest, writer and politician
- Gunnar Berge (born 1940), Norwegian politician, Labour Party
