= Starkweather, North Dakota =

- City
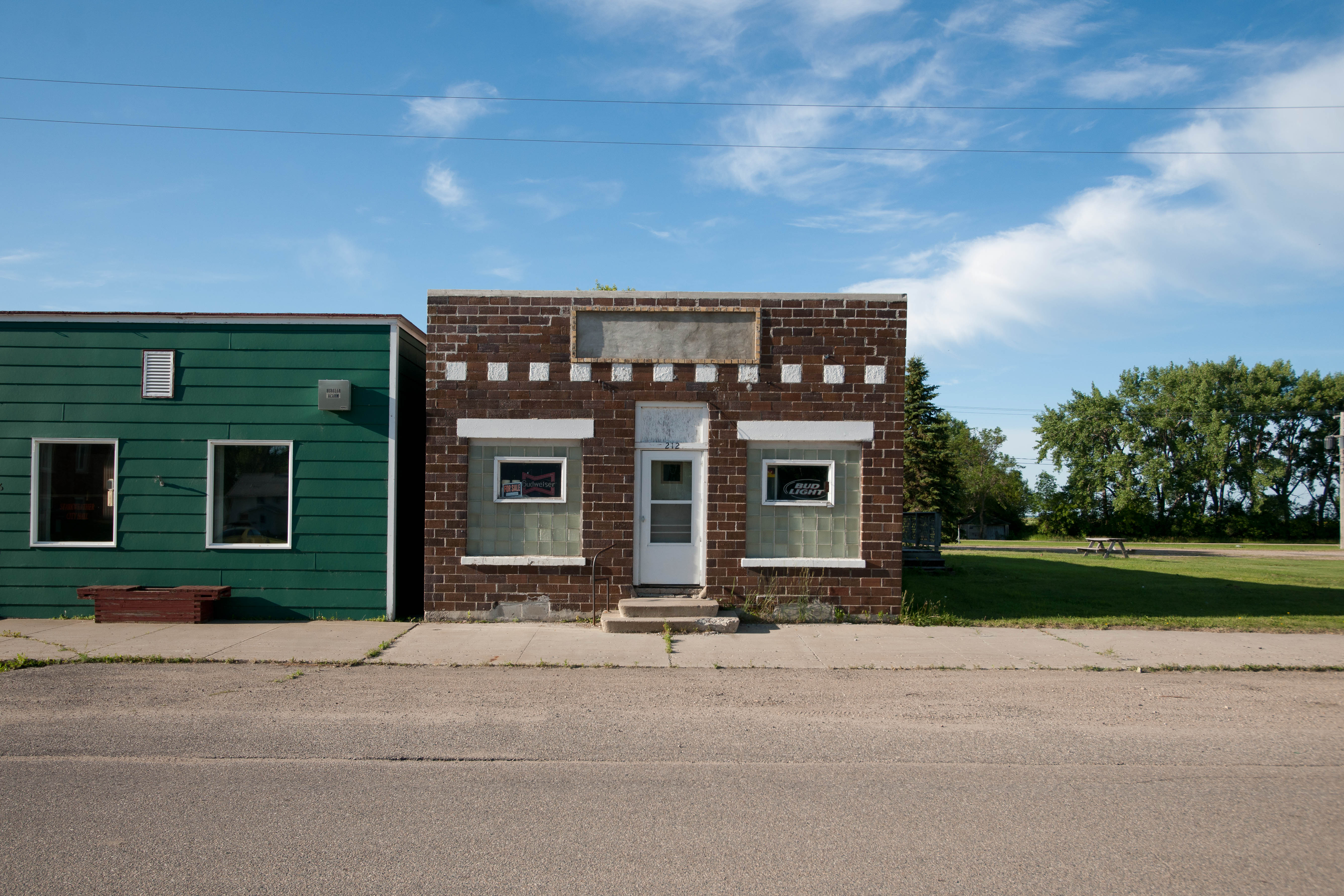
- Old Poncho Lefty's in Starkweather
- Interactive map of Starkweather, North Dakota
- Location within North Dakota Location within the United States
- Coordinates: 48.4521°N 98.8784°W
- Country: United States
- State: North Dakota
- County: Ramsey
- Founded: 1902

Area
  - Total: 0.130 sq mi (0.336 km^{2})
  - Land: 0.130 sq mi (0.336 km^{2})
  - Water: 0 sq mi (0.000 km^{2}) 0.00%
- Elevation: 1,499 ft (457 m)

Population (2020)
  - Total: 100
  - Estimate (2025): 97
  - Density: 770/sq mi (300/km^{2})
- Time zone: UTC–6 (Central (CST))
  - Summer (DST): UTC–5 (CDT)
- ZIP Code: 58377
- Area code: 701
- FIPS code: 38-75580
- GNIS feature ID: 1036286
- Website: starkweathernd.pages.dev

Starkweather is a city in Ramsey County, North Dakota, United States. The population was 100 as of the 2020 census, and was estimated at 97 in 2025.

== History ==
Starkweather was founded in 1902.

== Geography ==
According to the United States Census Bureau, the city has a total area of 0.130 square miles (0.34 km^{2}), all land.

== Demographics ==
Historical population
| Census | Pop. | Note | %± |
|---|---|---|---|
| 1910 | 246 | | — |
| 1920 | 302 | | 22.8% |
| 1930 | 312 | | 3.3% |
| 1940 | 295 | | −5.4% |
| 1950 | 229 | | −22.4% |
| 1960 | 223 | | −2.6% |
| 1970 | 193 | | −13.5% |
| 1980 | 210 | | 8.8% |
| 1990 | 197 | | −6.2% |
| 2000 | 157 | | −20.3% |
| 2010 | 117 | | −25.5% |
| 2020 | 100 | | −14.5% |
| 2025 (est.) | 97 | | −3.0% |
U.S. Decennial Census; 2020 Census

=== 2020 census ===
As of the 2020 census, there were 100 people, 48 households, and 26 families residing in the city.

=== 2010 census ===
As of the 2010 census, there were 117 people, 49 households, and 34 families residing in the city. The population density was 835.7 inhabitants per square mile (322.7/km^{2}). There were 74 housing units at an average density of 528.6 per square mile (204.1/km^{2}). The racial makeup of the city was 86.3% White, 9.4% Native American, and 4.3% from two or more races. Hispanic or Latino people of any race were 3.4% of the population.

There were 49 households, of which 26.5% had children under the age of 18 living with them, 49.0% were married couples living together, 10.2% had a female householder with no husband present, 10.2% had a male householder with no wife present, and 30.6% were non-families. 26.5% of all households were made up of individuals, and 8.1% had someone living alone who was 65 years of age or older. The average household size was 2.39 and the average family size was 2.79.

The median age in the city was 40.9 years. 23.1% of residents were under the age of 18; 9.4% were between the ages of 18 and 24; 19.7% were from 25 to 44; 32.4% were from 45 to 64; and 15.4% were 65 years of age or older. The gender makeup of the city was 48.7% male and 51.3% female.

=== 2000 census ===
As of the 2000 census, there were 157 people, 60 households, and 46 families residing in the city. The population density was 1,120.1 inhabitants per square mile (432.5/km^{2}). There were 89 housing units at an average density of 634.9 per square mile (245.1/km^{2}). The racial makeup of the city was 98.73% White, 0.64% Native American, 0.64% from other races. Hispanic or Latino people of any race were 0.64% of the population.

There were 60 households, out of which 28.3% had children under the age of 18 living with them, 70.0% were married couples living together, 5.0% had a female householder with no husband present, and 23.3% were non-families. 23.3% of all households were made up of individuals, and 6.7% had someone living alone who was 65 years of age or older. The average household size was 2.62 and the average family size was 3.09.

In the city, the population was spread out, with 23.6% under the age of 18, 7.6% from 18 to 24, 27.4% from 25 to 44, 24.2% from 45 to 64, and 17.2% who were 65 years of age or older. The median age was 41 years. For every 100 females, there were 98.7 males. For every 100 females age 18 and over, there were 114.3 males.

The median income for a household in the city was $28,750, and the median income for a family was $35,208. Males had a median income of $25,833 versus $16,563 for females. The per capita income for the city was $12,278. About 8.1% of families and 8.3% of the population were below the poverty line, including 3.1% of those under the age of eighteen and none of those 65 or over.

== Education ==
The area is served by the Starkweather Public School District. It operates the Starkweather School. In the 2025-26 academic year, the district reported a total of 65 students.

== Notable people ==
- Gordon Berg, farmer and member of the North Dakota House of Representatives
