= Liberal Laboratory (Norway) =

Norwegian think tank

LibLab (short for Liberalt Laboratorium - Liberal Laboratory) was a Norwegian liberal think-tank. The organization was founded in 2005, and was led by chairman Martin E. Sandbu, and vice-chairman Gard Lindseth. It ended its activities in 2011.

Their stated goals were to promote a more long-term oriented and value-based political debate in Norway, as well as to promote social liberal values.

From the Liberal Laboratory Foundation’s statutes:

Liberal Laboratory Foundation is a think tank, founded on the firm belief that ideas, principles and social visions are among the strongest forces in a society’s development. Liberal Laboratory has two aims:

1. To make Norwegian policy more long term and more value based. Liberal Laboratory shall strengthen the ideological innovation which is needed to give individuals influence over their own lives through active participation in the political process.
2. To build a vision for the future of Norway as a socially conscious, liberal society, and to strengthen political forces that further such values. Based on the values of social liberalism, Liberal Laboratory shall develop political solutions that enable individuals to take responsibility for their own lives and for the society they live in.

== See also ==
- Civita
- Liberal Science Institute
- Minerva
