= Hans Christoffer Klæboe =

Norwegian politician

Hans Christoffer Klæboe (1753 – February 1843) was a Norwegian politician.

He was a deputy representative to the Norwegian Parliament in 1818, representing the constituency of Finmarkens Amt (Troms county did not exist until 1866). After the regular representative Gunner Berg was hit by illness, and never got to actually meet in Parliament, Klæboe took over for the rest of the term.
