= Libertas (Norway) =

Libertas was a Norwegian libertarian business organisation.

It was founded in Oslo in 1947. The organisation's first secretary-general was jurist Trygve de Lange. It fought against the regulation politics of the Labour Party, and had considerable influence on conservatives in the 1950s and 1960s. It held lectures at Elingård in Fredrikstad from 1948, and published the magazine Nå from 1952 to 1995. Libertas was succeeded by the Liberal Research Institute in 1988.

Trygve de Lange was secretary-general from 1947 to 1976. The chairmen were Odd Berg (1947–1952), Knut Halvorsen (–1965), Johan Hjort (1965–1968), Jens C. Hagen (1968–), Hjalmar Aass (–1978), Birger Halvorsen (1978–), Johan Fredrik Biermann, Sverre Sunde and Sigurd Herlofson (1980s).
