= Star Trek: Nemesis =

2002 American science fiction film by Stuart Baird

- Theatrical release poster
- Directed by: Stuart Baird
- Screenplay by: John Logan
- Story by: John Logan; Rick Berman; Brent Spiner
- Based on: Star Trek by Gene Roddenberry
- Produced by: Rick Berman
- Starring: Patrick Stewart; Jonathan Frakes; Brent Spiner; LeVar Burton; Michael Dorn; Gates McFadden; Marina Sirtis
- Cinematography: Jeffrey L. Kimball
- Edited by: Dallas Puett
- Music by: Jerry Goldsmith
- Distributed by: Paramount Pictures
- Release dates: December 9, 2002 (Los Angeles premiere); December 13, 2002 (United States)
- Running time: 117 minutes
- Country: United States
- Language: English
- Budget: $60 million
- Box office: $67.3 million

Star Trek: Nemesis is a 2002 American science fiction film directed by Stuart Baird. It is the tenth installment in the Star Trek franchise, and the fourth and final film to star the cast of Star Trek: The Next Generation. It was written by John Logan from a story he developed with Brent Spiner and producer Rick Berman. In the film, the crew of the Starship Enterprise deal with the threat posed by a clone of Captain Jean-Luc Picard (Patrick Stewart) named Shinzon (Tom Hardy), who has taken control of the Romulan Star Empire in a coup d'état.

Principal photography for the film took place from November 2001 to March 2002. Nemesis held its world premiere at Grauman's Chinese Theatre in Los Angeles on December 9, 2002.

Released in North America on December 13, 2002, by Paramount Pictures, the film received generally mixed reviews and is considered to be one of the worst films in the franchise. It was also a box office failure, earning $67.3 million worldwide against a $60 million budget. Plans for another film featuring The Next Generation cast were scrapped, and the film series was rebooted instead with Star Trek in 2009. The television series Star Trek: Picard, a continuation of The Next Generation and Nemesis set two decades after the latter at the end of the 24th century, premiered in 2020.

== Plot ==
On Romulus, members of the Romulan Senate debate terms of peace and alliance with the Reman rebel leader Shinzon. The Remans are a slave race of the Romulan Empire from the neighboring planet Remus, used as miners and cannon fodder. While a faction of the military supports Shinzon, the Praetor and Senate oppose an alliance. After rejecting the motion, a device left in the room disintegrates the Praetor and senators.

Meanwhile, on Earth, the crew of the starship Enterprise prepare to bid farewell to newly married officers William Riker and Deanna Troi. En route to a second ceremony on Troi's homeworld, they discover an energy reading on the planet Kolarus III near the Romulan Neutral Zone. Captain Jean-Luc Picard, security officer Worf, and android officer Data land on the planet and discover the remnants of an android resembling Data, named B-4. The trio is attacked by the native population and leaves the planet with B-4, which they deduce to be an earlier prototype built by Data's creator.

Enterprise is then ordered on a diplomatic mission to Romulus, where Shinzon has taken over the Empire and professes a desire for peace with the Federation. On arrival, they learn Shinzon is a clone of Picard, secretly created by the Romulans to plant a high-ranking spy into the Federation. The project was abandoned when Shinzon was still a child, and he was left on Remus to die as a slave. After many years, Shinzon became the leader of the Remans and constructed a heavily armed flagship, Scimitar. The Enterprise crew discovers that Scimitar produces low levels of deadly thalaron radiation, the same radiation used to wipe out the Romulan Senate. There are also unexpected attempts to communicate with the Enterprise computers, and Shinzon invades Troi's mind through the telepathy of his Reman viceroy while she is making love to Riker.

Medical officer Doctor Beverly Crusher discovers that Shinzon is dying because of the process used to clone him, and the only possible treatment is a transfusion of Picard's blood. Shinzon kidnaps Picard and B-4, having planted the android on Kolarus as a lure. However, Data reveals he swapped places with B-4 and rescues Picard. They determine Shinzon plans to use Scimitar to invade the Federation, using its thalaron radiation generator to eradicate all life on Earth.

Enterprise races back to Federation space but is ambushed by Scimitar in the Bassen Rift, a region that prevents subspace communication. Despite the aid of two Romulan Warbirds, Enterprise is heavily damaged. Picard rams his ship into Scimitar, crippling both vessels. Shinzon activates the Thalaron weapon in an act of mutually assured destruction. Picard boards Scimitar alone to face Shinzon, and kills him by impaling him on a metal strut. With Enterprise's transporters down, Data leaps the distance between the two ships equipped with an emergency transporter, transports Picard off the ship, and sacrifices himself to destroy the thalaron generator and Scimitar with it. The crew mourns Data, and the surviving Romulan commander, Donatra, offers them her gratitude for saving the Empire.

Back on Earth, Picard bids farewell to Riker, who is leaving with Troi to command the USS Titan. Picard meets with B-4 and explains that before he boarded the Scimitar, Data downloaded his memories into B-4, allowing him to live on.

== Cast ==
- Patrick Stewart as Captain Jean-Luc Picard, the Enterprise's commanding officer
- Jonathan Frakes as Commander / Captain William T. Riker, the Enterprise's executive officer, later captain of the USS Titan
- Brent Spiner as Lieutenant Commander Data, the Enterprise's android operations officer
  - Spiner also plays B-4, Data's "brother"
- LeVar Burton as Lieutenant Commander Geordi La Forge, the Enterprise's chief engineer
- Michael Dorn as Lieutenant Commander Worf, the Enterprise's Klingon tactical officer
- Gates McFadden as Doctor Beverly Crusher, the Enterprise's medical officer
- Marina Sirtis as Counselor Deanna Troi, the Enterprise's half-Betazoid counselor
- Tom Hardy as Praetor Shinzon, the leader of the Reman people.
- Ron Perlman as the Reman Viceroy, Shinzon's second-in-command
- Dina Meyer as Romulan Commander Donatra, a Romulan officer, commander of the Valdore
- John Berg as Romulan Senator
- Kate Mulgrew as Admiral Kathryn Janeway, Picard's superior and former captain of USS Voyager
- Shannon Cochran as Senator Tal'aura
- Jude Ciccolella as Commander Suran
- Alan Dale as Praetor Hiren, the leader of the Romulans
- Wil Wheaton as Wesley Crusher, Dr Crusher's son and a Starfleet officer
- Majel Barrett as the voice of the Enterprise's computer
- Stuart Baird as the voice of the Scimitar's computer
- Bryan Singer as Kelly, an Enterprise officer (uncredited)
- Whoopi Goldberg as Guinan, an alien bartender, lately of the Enterprise-D and friend of the crew (uncredited)

== Production ==
=== Development ===
John Logan, Rick Berman and Brent Spiner spent nearly two years developing the concept. Logan wanted the Romulans to feature, finding their oily backhandedness more interesting than the straightforward violence of the Klingons as antagonists. He insisted the story could feature the Remans, thinking that the second of the two planets featured in the Romulan crest must refer to them. The producers considered adding the characters of Spock or Sela to the story, but considered them a distraction from the plot or too confusing to introduce for casual viewers. Through subsequent drafts, much of the Romulan political intrigue was jettisoned to focus on the Picard/Shinzon and Data/B-4 relationships. The cast members' input informed story and script changes; Stewart objected to an early idea that Shinzon was not a clone but Picard's lost son, feeling it had been already explored and lent itself to "uninteresting" emotional dynamics.

Stuart Baird was brought in to direct Star Trek: Nemesis by executive producer Rick Berman. It was Baird's third film following US Marshals and Executive Decision, although he had directed a variety of second units previously. Baird did not have a background in Star Trek; he was aware of the films and television series, but did not consider himself an expert on the subject. Berman explained that Baird would bring "fresh blood" to the film and that Berman had enjoyed "the sense of fun and action that existed in Executive Decision." Baird said in a promotional interview that this resulted in a non-typical Baird film, saying that it was "perhaps a little different from the dynamics of the previous films." He wanted to add energy to the action scenes and added some set pieces, such as the car chase. He called that scene a "signature piece" for the film, which turns dark after the crew is put in danger by the inhabitants of the planet. He also found that the cast would discuss any issues they had with the direction he gave to their characters. Despite Frakes' being in the cast and having directed the previous two Star Trek films, Baird decided not to seek his opinion on the direction of the film. He said that there was no resentment on set, noting that Frakes was completing work on directing Clockstoppers at the time and so likely could not have taken on directing Nemesis even if Baird had not been given the job. Baird had hoped that Nemesis would be enough of a success that he could consider whether to take the lead on a future, eleventh Star Trek film.

=== Casting ===
Baird and Berman had been searching for someone who resembled Patrick Stewart but looked about 25 years younger; at one point they considered Jude Law. Baird specifically wanted an unknown actor and Tom Hardy auditioned by tape after Stewart asked Hardy's agent if he thought any of his clients were suitable for the role. Hardy was filming Simon: An English Legionnaire in Morocco at the time, and decided against using the requested text for the audition. Instead, he got possession of a full script for Nemesis, used a different part of the script, and filmed it partly nude. He was flown to Los Angeles to do a screen test with Stewart; Hardy later described his performance there as "appalling". However, he had recorded himself performing the same piece in a hotel room the night before and gave that tape to Baird, resulting in his being cast as Shinzon a few days later. Michael Shanks also auditioned for the role.

Marina Sirtis was "ecstatic" about the role Troi plays in the movie. She was pleased with the wedding scene, saying that the dress she wore for Nemesis was nicer than the one she wore at her actual wedding. She was happy to work once again with Wil Wheaton and Whoopi Goldberg, but felt that the film would be the last one with the entire cast of Star Trek: The Next Generation. She remained certain that it would not be the last Star Trek film to be made, as she thought that Paramount Pictures would want to make a film involving a variety of characters from the different Star Trek series.

Ron Perlman and Hardy became friends on the set. Perlman said in an interview eight years after the release of the film: "I loved him when I first met him. I loved working with him. I found him to be really smart, really a great kid."

=== Design ===
Nemesis called for a number of new ship and vehicle designs. Illustrator John Eaves developed concept art for the new craft, collaborating with the artists at effects house Digital Domain to adjust the designs as necessary when something worked in a two-dimensional drawing but did not look right once realized with three-dimensional computer-generated imagery (CGI). Shinzon's Scimitar was designed to appear to have a shared lineage with the new Romulan Warbird designs, but with the Romulan ships being sleeker, and the Reman ship more aggressive-looking with sharper edges. The new Warbirds retained elements from the Warbird Andrew Probert had designed for The Next Generation, namely a birdlike bow. Eaves also consulted reference books for ideas on how to create featherlike patterns on the ships, realizing he may have been consulting the same inspiration that Nilo Rodis had used when developing the Bird of Prey for Star Trek III. "So I went back and changed what I had done so as to not copy him," Eaves recalled. "In a way, it was a tribute to Nilo's ship without being a remodel of it." Scimitar's early concepts also echoed Rodis' Bird of Prey, with a large body framed by swept wings. Eaves decided to have the ship feature a "battle mode", with the wings splitting open as the film progresses to deploy the thalaron weapon. The initial digital model of Scimitar was more than two million polygons, and took two hours to render a single frame of it. Affects art director Ron Gress and CG modeling lead Jay Barton whittled the design down to roughly 1.5 million polygons to make it easier to render. Eaves also took advantage of the computer-generated nature of the ships to make subtle adjustments to the design of the Enterprise, which had been created for First Contact. Because of the orientation of battle scenes in that film, the ship was armed mostly towards the bottom and fore of the ship. In Nemesis, the script called for Scimitar to launch attacks at Enterprise's top and aft, so the artists added additional weapon emplacements in those areas to return fire. Other adjustments included tweaking the placement of the engine nacelles and adding more of a curve along the hull. The Enterprise model was made up of 1.3 million polygons, with the textures drawn from photographs of the real studio model fabricated for First Contact. It, and all the other digital models, were rendered in Lightwave 3D for exterior views and Maya for interiors. A few designs were partially realized through practical means, including the Reman Scorpions, and the all-terrain vehicles used in the Kolarus III sequence.

Production design was headed by Herman Zimmerman.

=== Filming ===
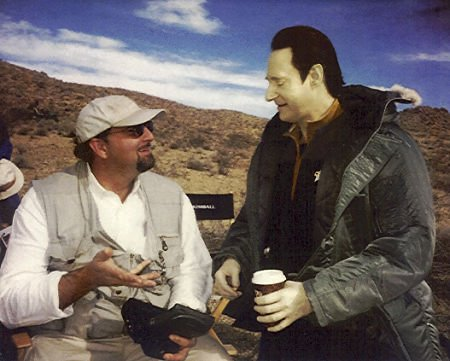
Glenn Cote and Brent Spiner on the set of Nemesis

Principal photography began in December 2001 in Southern California.

In promotional interviews for the film, Patrick Stewart stated that room for a sequel was intentionally left.

The first cut of the movie was 160 minutes long. The film was heavily trimmed down to a running time of under two hours, losing many character scenes, including Crusher leaving for a new medical position, La Forge dating Leah Brahms, and Wesley Crusher appearing at the wedding.

=== Make-up and effects ===
While many of the creative team were new to the series, the film's makeup was handled by Michael Westmore, who had worked on the franchise since 1986. The make-up team sought to make Hardy look more similar to Stewart by creating latex prosthetics from moulds of the latter's face. These included numerous versions of noses and chins, and in order to reduce the visible size of Hardy's lips a fake scar was added.

Digital Domain handled most of the film's effects, contributing more than 30 minutes to the film across 400 shots. With the added pressure of trying to outdo expectations, the effects house had only five months to produce the bulk of the film's effects, as much of the sequences did not arrive until May 2002. Positive early reception to Digital Domain's efforts led to an increase in the scope of work, as Baird was able to lobby the studio to fund more expansive effects sequences. With their capabilities stretched, Digital Domain passed extra work to other studios, sending along already-finished examples to act as a reference for the roughly 15% of work they outsourced.

The opening sequence on Romulus used a three-dimensional (3D) environment built based on two-dimensional matte paintings originally done by effects house Illusion Arts for the television series. Illusion Arts also produced other shots of the Romulan capital seen later in the film, brought to life with animated people and moving ships in the sky. Baird wanted the death of the Romulan senate to be gory but not disturbing. The senators' initial decay was accomplished with makeup effects, with only the main characters in the foreground augmented with digital effects, as decay textures were mapped to the actors' faces. Digital scans of the actors were used to fabricate model heads and bodies used for the final part of the transformation; the models were shells filled with material to simulate ash upon shattering as the senators disintegrate.

Although the majority of the exterior shots of ships were computer-generated, a practical 17-foot Enterprise saucer was built and collided into a model of the Scimitar for the film's climax.

== Music ==
The music to Star Trek: Nemesis was composed and conducted by Jerry Goldsmith, who composed previous entries in the franchise, such as the Academy Award-nominated score for Star Trek: The Motion Picture, Star Trek V: The Final Frontier, Star Trek: First Contact, and Star Trek: Insurrection, as well as the themes to the television series Star Trek: The Next Generation (arranged by Dennis McCarthy) and Star Trek: Voyager, and performed by the Hollywood Studio Symphony. He had also scored both of Baird's previous films, Executive Decision and U.S. Marshals. Nemesis was one of the final works written before Goldsmith's death in 2004.

The score opens with airy synthesizers under a trumpet performing an augmented triad before preceding into Alexander Courage's Star Trek: The Original Series fanfare. The score then quickly transitions into a much darker theme to accompany the conflict between the Remans and Romulans. Goldsmith also composed a new 5-note theme to accompany the character Shinzon and the Scimitar, which is manipulated throughout the score to reflect the multiple dimensions of the character. The score is book-ended with Goldsmith's theme from Star Trek: The Motion Picture, following a brief excerpt from the song "Blue Skies" by Irving Berlin and the original Star Trek fanfare.

== Themes ==
Nemesis continues the franchise's longtime focus on issues of identity and cloning, which had only grown more pronounced after the cloning of the sheep Dolly in 1996. The film even recasts the Romulan Empire as a mirror image of the Federation. Law professor Kieran Tranter and Bronwyn Statham argue that Nemesis explores the "clone hysteria" that, concurrent to the film's release, led to the passage of the Prohibition of Human Cloning Act in Australia. To them, Nemesis repeats the tropes of the double being innately evil with Picard and Shinzon, but challenges it with Data and B-4. It is Data, not the duplicate, who impersonates the other in subterfuge, and there is no "uncanny [...] commonality" in their relation to each other; they relate not as good and evil twins, but as family. Clone hysteria also focuses on the loss of individuality; Shinzon suffers a crisis of identity upon meeting Picard and must destroy the original to survive. But the film also touches on the question of Nature versus nurture. Tranter, Statham, and professor Diana Relke agree that Nemesis rejects the simple thesis that genetics determines the self. Jan Domaradzki noted that Nemesis' treatment of clones aligns with common features of biotechnologies in science fiction films, where the technology is relatively easy but comes with serious side effects and medical issues for the clones.

David Green argued in 2009 that Nemesis was the apotheosis of the franchise's recurring challenges to traditional conceptions of masculinity, offering a version of Paradise Lost that can be seen to have queer themes.

== Release ==
=== Marketing ===
At the time of Nemesis's release, Star Trek was an aging franchise of more than 35 years, and the film (alongside the recent release of the television show Star Trek: Enterprise) were seen as attempts to appeal to younger viewers with sex appeal and a heavier focus on action. Nemesis had comparatively little marketing, despite releasing so long after the previous film. Merchandise included a line of action figures, trading card set, soundtrack, novelization, and tie-in official magazines. Regional food promotions with Safeway Grocery Stores and Del Taco occurred in Southern California.

=== Box office ===
The premiere of Star Trek: Nemesis took place at Grauman's Chinese Theatre in Los Angeles on December 9, 2002. It was attended by the cast and crew, except Jonathan Frakes, who was away directing the film Thunderbirds. The after party was held in the Kodak Theatre complex. Nemesis was released on December 13, 2002, in direct competition with Harry Potter and the Chamber of Secrets (released November 15, 2002), the 20th James Bond film Die Another Day (released November 22, 2002), and The Lord of the Rings: The Two Towers (released December 18, 2002). Producer Rick Berman has suggested that Nemesis's performance may have been negatively affected by "the competition of other films". This poor performance was predicted by reviewers, due to the short period in the film's release before The Two Towers was released. The film's gross domestic income was the lowest of the franchise at $43,254,409 as of September 2008. It opened at #2 in the US box office ($200,000 behind Maid in Manhattan) and was the first Trek film not to debut as the highest-grossing film of the week. It earned a total of $67,312,826 worldwide, against a production budget of $60 million.

== Reception ==
Nemesis received negative reviews from critics. 37% of 171 critics gave the film a positive review on Rotten Tomatoes, and on Metacritic the film has a score of 51 out of 100 based on reviews from 29 critics. Theatergoing audiences surveyed by CinemaScore gave the film a grade "A−" on scale of A to F.

Roger Ebert of the Chicago Sun-Times had mixed feelings about the film, stating: "I'm smiling like a good sport and trying to get with the dialogue ... and gradually it occurs to me that Star Trek is over for me. I've been looking at these stories for half a lifetime, and, let's face it, they're out of gas." Ebert gave the film two out of four stars. Mick LaSalle of the San Francisco Chronicle said that the film had a "rather harebrained story" befitting a "novelty episode of the TV series". While he commended Patrick Stewart for lending the film "integrity and wry stoicism" as Picard, Tom Hardy missed the opportunity to imitate Stewart's voice as if Shinzon was a youthfully pompous "Picard from hell", and thereby diminished both the believability and the entertainment value of the cloning plot line. Owen Gleiberman of Entertainment Weekly gave the film a positive review, commenting that the crew "indulge[s] the force of humanity over hardware in a way that George Lucas had forgotten." Gleiberman gave the film a "B−". Stephen Holden of The New York Times said that the film is a "klutzy affair whose warm, fuzzy heart emits intermittent bleats from the sleeve of its gleaming spacesuit". Holden praised the scenes where the Enterprise and the Scimitar ram into each other during the final battle.

Diana Relke suggested that in the post-9/11 cultural consciousness, the message of an illegitimate political leader launching an unprovoked war might have been a parallel to real events American audiences were not ready to entertain.

The film was nominated for the Saturn Awards for Best Science Fiction Film and Best Costume but lost to both Minority Report and Star Wars: Episode II – Attack of the Clones, respectively, while Hardy was nominated for Best Supporting Actor but lost out to Andy Serkis for his role in The Lord of the Rings: The Two Towers.

The movie was not well-loved among the cast, with LeVar Burton and Marina Sirtis speaking unflatteringly of Baird, criticizing him for not watching any episodes of The Next Generation. Frakes said that if he himself had directed Nemesis, he would have made the film less villain-centric and given more screen time to the regular Next Generation cast. Stewart later described Nemesis as a "pretty weak" finale for The Next Generation.

Some of the events of the film would later be followed up on in the 2020 television series Star Trek: Picard, set twenty years after the events of Nemesis.

== Home media ==
On May 20, 2003, Nemesis was released on DVD in both anamorphic widescreen and full screen editions in Region 1, and was also released on VHS. The initial DVD release contained an audio commentary by director Stuart Baird, four featurettes on the film's production, seven deleted scenes, a photo gallery, and a preview for Star Trek: Deep Space Nine on DVD at Amazon.com. Also on October 4, 2005, Star Trek: Nemesis was released on UMD in widescreen for Region 1 only; it is the only Star Trek film or show ever released on UMD. The initial release was followed up with a "Special Collector's Edition" in Region 1 on October 4, 2005. Although this two-disc set contained several additional features, it also duplicated some of the features found in the initial release. The film was released on Blu-ray on September 22, 2009, as part of the Star Trek: The Next Generation Motion Picture Collection in the United States. It was subsequently released individually in Japan and the United Kingdom. The Blu-ray edition contains high definition bonus features not seen on previous DVD releases. The four Next Generation feature films were released on Ultra HD Blu-ray on April 4, 2023, in standalone and collected formats.

== Bibliography ==
- Cloud, John (December 16, 2002). "Star Trek Inc". Time. pp. 73–74. ISSN 0040-781X.
- Domaradzki, Jan (2021). "Popular Culture and Genetics: Genetics and Biotechnologies in the Movies". Polish Sociological Review (215): 281–310.
- Bishop, Katherine; Rabitsch, Stefan (2022). "Star Trek Nemesis". The Routledge Handbook of Star Trek. Taylor & Francis. ISBN 978-1-00-056996-4.
- Greven, David (2009). "The Echo Over the Voice". Gender and sexuality in Star Trek: allegories of desire in the television series and films. McFarland & Company. ISBN 978-0-7864-4413-7.
- Ledas, Leora (2017). "A New Vision: J. J. Abrams, 'Star Trek', and Promotional Authorship". Cinema Journal. 56 (2): 46–66. doi:10.1353/cj.2017.0002. ISSN 0009-7101.
- Nemecek, Larry (2003). Star Trek: The Next Generation Companion (3rd ed.). Pocket Books. ISBN 0743457986.
- Norton, Bill (April 2003). "Through a Glass Darkly". Cinefex. No. 93. ISSN 0198-1056.
- Okuda, Michael (October 5, 2005). Star Trek: Nemesis; Text commentary (DVD; Disc 1/2). Paramount Pictures.
- Relke, Diana (2006). Drones, Clones, and Alpha Babes: Retrofitting Star Trek's Humanism, Post-9/11. University of Calgary Press. ISBN 978-1-55238-164-9.
- Staff (January 2003a). "Interview: John Logan". Star Trek: The Magazine. Vol. 3, no. 9. ISSN 1523-9195.
- Staff (February 2003b). "Star Trek Nemesis Special Issue". Star Trek: The Magazine. Vol. 3, no. 10. ISSN 1523-9195.
- Staff (March 2003c). "Star Trek Nemesis: The Untold Story". Star Trek: The Magazine. Vol. 3, no. 11. ISSN 1523-9195.
- Summers, Tim (2018). "From 'Sabotage' to 'Sledgehammer': Trailers, Songs, and the Musical Marketing of Star Trek Beyond". Music and the Moving Image. 11 (1): 40–65. doi:10.5406/musimoviimag.11.1.0040.
- Tranter, Kieran; Statham, Bronwyn (2007). "Echo and Mirror: Clone Hysteria, Genetic Determinism and Star Trek Nemesis" (PDF). Law, Culture and the Humanities. 3 (3): 361–380. doi:10.1177/1743872107081425. hdl:10072/18838. ISSN 1743-8721.
