= Politikk som idékamp =

2007 book by Johannes W. Løvhaug

- Author: Johannes Waage Løvhaug
- Language: Norwegian
- Subject: The periodical Minerva (1957–1972)
- Genre: Non-fiction
- Publisher: Pax Forlag
- Publication date: November 2007
- Publication place: Norway
- Pages: 336 pp.
- ISBN: 978-82-530-3046-3 (13)

Politikk som idékamp: Et intellektuelt gruppeportrett av Minerva-kretsen 1957–1972 (English: Politics as Idea Struggle: An Intellectual Group Portrait of the Minerva Circle 1957–1972) is a 2007 book by Johannes W. Løvhaug. The book details the development and influence of the conservative periodical Minerva in post-war Norway. Its most distinguished editors, who were chiefly composed of students critical to the contemporaneous radicalisation of politics, are also portrayed. They are, together with the writers and the most loyal readers of periodical, described by Løvhaug as the "Minerva circle".

== Background ==
At the time of publication, Johannes Løvhaug, aged 40, worked as a journalist for the periodical Apollon of the University of Oslo. In a 2007 interview with the left-wing weekly Morgenbladet, he stated that he wanted to study how the editors of Minerva criticised positivism from a conservative perspective. Løvhaug states in the foreword of the book that it has two major purposes. One is to clarify the framework of the circle's activity, its political environment, what its purpose was and in which surroundings it operated. The other is to discover what kind of ideas were of importance to the circle and what kind of conservatism and ideological debate evolved from the periodical and the activity of the affiliated editors.

== Content ==
"The Minerva-circle found themselves in combat on multiple intellectual arenas: They felt squeezed between the Labour Party state and the free enterprise liberalism and tried to create a platform for a third, conservative point of view in Norwegian politics."

— Johannes Løvhaug: Politikk som idékamp, p. 12 (Note: Norwegian: Minerva-kretsens medlemmer så seg selv i kamp på flere arenaer: De følte seg skviset mellom arbeiderpartistaten og næringslivsliberalismen og søkte her å skape en plattform for et tredje konservativt standpunkt i norsk politikk.)

The book is divided into three parts, with 13 chapters each, in addition to the introduction and the epilogue. The first part is named "En krets og et tidsskrift" ("A circle and a periodical"), the second "Det prepolitiske" ("The pre-political") and the third "Det politiske" ("The political").

== Publication ==
Politikk som idékamp was published by the Norwegian left-wing publishing company Pax Forlag, together with the book Fra den annen front by the former Minerva editor Lars Roar Langslet. This happened in 2007, 50 years after the re-establishment of the periodical.

== Reception ==
The book received mixed critics by reviewers. In a review for the Norwegian Broadcasting Corporation, Tarjei Skirbekk stated that it was "a good book", and that Løvhaug delivered an "interesting approach to the history of the Minerva circle and the society within which it operated". However, Skirbekk criticised Løvhaug for having overestimated the influence and significance of the periodical. Bernt Hagtvet stated in his review for Stavanger Aftenblad that the book was a "fine study", and that it brought back "the loss of a caring right". Conversely, Ottar Brox, writing for the far-left daily newspaper Klassekampen, labelled the book a "paradoxical celebration of the front figures of the right-wing revolution". In an article published in the left-liberal weekly Morgenbladet, journalist Pål Veiden opined that the book was too sympathetically inclined to the Minerva circle, and that it told many uninteresting details about the periodical.
