= Stiftelsen Manifest =

Norwegian socialist think-tank

Stiftelsen Manifest (also referred to as "Manifest Analyse") is a Norwegian left-wing think tank focused on labour, welfare, and economic inequality. It originates in the trade-union movement and positions itself as a research and analysis centre, meant to shape public debate on social and economic issues.

Manifest is said to be one of Norway’s main advocacy-oriented think tanks. It uses research strategically to influence public debate and operates as an ideologically driven organisation with explicit policy aims (rather than as an academically neutral institution).

Manifest has been particularly successful in securing visibility through op-eds, media commentary and placement of its reports in national outlets, making it a prominent actor in public communication around labour and welfare policy.

== See also ==
- Civita
- LibLab
