= Iyad el-Baghdadi =

Palestinian Human rights activist (born 1975)

- إياد البغدادي
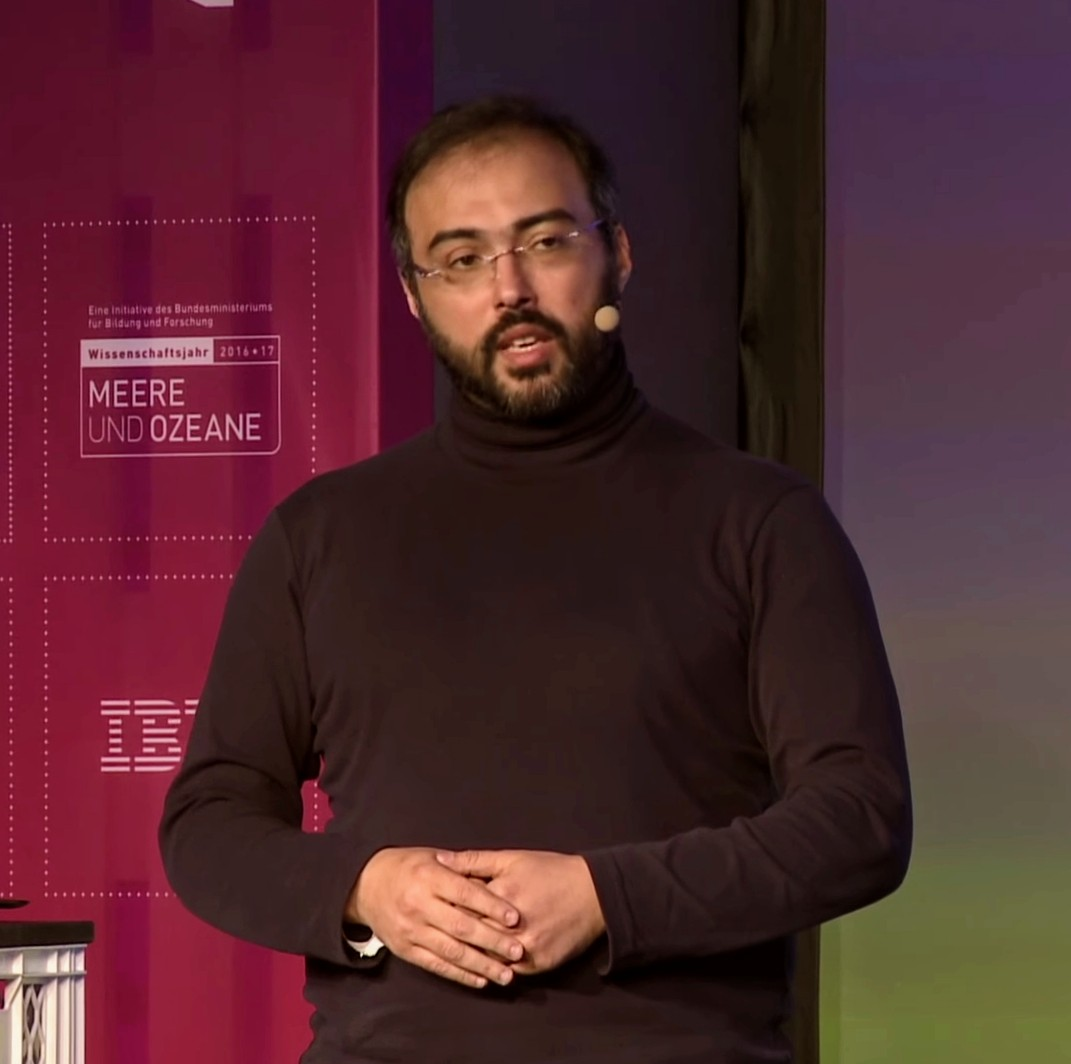
- Iyad el-Baghdadi in 2017
- Born: June 17, 1977 (age 48); Kuwait
- Citizenship: Palestinian; Norwegian
- Occupations: Writer, activist

Iyad el-Baghdadi (Arabic: إياد البغدادي; born June 17, 1977) is a Palestinian-Norwegian writer and human rights activist who attained international prominence during the Arab Spring. He is the author of The Middle East Crisis Factory, a book on the Middle East and North Africa and Western foreign policy in the region. He is the founder of the human rights organisation Kawaakibi Foundation.

Baghdadi is based in Oslo, Norway. He was an advocate for pro-democracy movements during the Arab Spring. He is an expert on Islam and political liberties. He is also an outspoken activist on the Israeli–Palestinian conflict and advocates for a one-state solution.

A Palestinian who was born in Kuwait and raised in the United Arab Emirates, he was a refugee in Norway until he received Norwegian citizenship in 2023.

== Early life ==
El-Baghdadi's father Ismael was born in Jaffa, Mandatory Palestine. As an infant, he and el-Baghdadi's paternal grandparents were displaced by the onset of the Nakba and settled in Egypt. Ismael moved to the United Arab Emirates in 1970. Iyad, born in Kuwait, was raised in the Emirates and lived in city of Ajman before his deportation to Malaysia in 2014.

Until the Arab Spring, he had a career as a computer programmer and startup consultant.

Between 2003 and 2007, following the Iraq War, Baghdadi underwent an experience of both radicalization and deradicalization. Since then, he has conducted extensive research on the nature and causes of radicalization and how it can be prevented.

== Arab Spring ==
=== Activism ===
During the Arab Spring in 2011, Baghdadi began tweeting about the ongoing Egyptian revolution. He provided English translations of Arabic-language statements, chants, and videos. His tweets, many of which not only reported on the latest developments but also provided commentary about the region's dictatorial leadership, gained him an enormous following.

A February 2011 YouTube video of Egyptian activist Asmaa Mahfouz's call for Egyptians to protest in Tahrir Square in Cairo, featuring translation by el-Baghdadi, was viewed over a million times. Many observers have credited this call with helping to bring down the presidency of Hosni Mubarak.

His Oslo Freedom Forum talk was published in November 2014 by Foreign Policy under the title "Why I Still Believe in the Arab Spring". In the talk, he suggested that his own chief contribution to the Arab Spring had been "in the realm of ideas." From the start he had insisted on the importance of having "a statement or manifesto" and a plan for what to do after one's revolt succeeded. He is an outspoken critic of both Islamic and secular authoritarianism.

=== Deportation ===
On May 1, 2014, the UAE immigration authorities informed el-Baghdadi that he is being deported from the United Arab Emirates. Immigration authorities provided no official reason. They did not formally charge him with a crime. According to el-Baghdadi he doesn't think his deportation was caused by a single tweet, but rather by his overall activism. He was offered deportation to Malaysia or indefinite detention. He arrived in Malaysia on May 13 and remained in Kuala Lumpur International Airport until June 8 or 9 when he managed to obtain a Palestinian passport. He remained in Malaysia until October after which he moved to Norway where he has applied for right of asylum.

== Personal life ==
On June 17, 2014, el-Baghdadi's wife gave birth to a son. On October 22, 2014, el-Baghdadi delivered a talk at the Oslo Freedom Forum where he mentioned he had only been able to spend three days with his son. He spent several months in a refugee camp in Norway before relocation.

Following his deportation, he developed PTSD but eventually recovered through intensive therapy. He has since spoken about his challenges and recovery, particularly noting the benefits of psychedelic therapy.

In June 2023, he became a Norwegian citizen.

== Views and work ==
=== Foreign policy ===
In a 2014 article for Foreign Policy, "ISIS Is Sisi Spelled Backwards," he warned against the notion that Arabs are "forced to either support the ruling autocrats in return for safety and stability, or to side with Islamist radicals in order to throw off the tyrants' yoke and avenge their transgressions." He argues that both nationalist fascism and Islamist radicalism are failures for true change in the Arab world, as tyranny and terrorism feed off each other in a worsening cycle. He also critiques Western nations for legitimising oppressive governments while ignoring human rights abuses and democratic alternatives.

In his keynote address at the Norad conference in February 2023, he emphasised that hypocrisy, rather than autocracy, poses the greatest threat to democracy.

On December 26, 2015, a Russian news outlet confused Baghdadi with ISIS leader Abu Bakr al-Baghdadi. Other media began echoing the mistake, and Twitter blocked him briefly. The confusion itself ended up becoming a major news story.

=== Radicalization research ===
In 2015, during the height of the ISIS wave, Baghdadi developed "The Radicalisation Roadmap," which explains how radicalisation narratives are constructed. Based on his observations of individuals' experiences with different radical ideologies, the model outlines seven steps:

1. Otherization: 'I am of one group, they are from another. We are different and separate.'
2. Collectivization: 'They are all the same.'
3. Oppression narrative: 'They are oppressing us.'
4. Collective guilt: 'They are complicit in oppressing us.'
5. Supremacism narrative: 'We are better than them.'
6. Self-defense: 'We have to retaliate for their aggression and defend ourselves.'
7. The idea of violence: 'Violence is the only way.'"

He later developed the 'Populist Grand Narrative,' which seeks to explain the process of collective radicalization and outlines the structure of populist narratives in four steps:

1. 'We were once great, virtuous, and homogenous.'
2. 'Our sovereignty has been robbed by traitors and foreigners.'
3. 'We must reclaim our sovereignty.'
4. 'This great, strong, punitive leader will make us great again.'

=== The Middle East Crisis Factory ===
His 2021 book with Ahmed Gatnash, The Middle East Crisis Factory, argues against monocausal analyses of geopolitical crises in the MENA region. It instead argues that a trifecta of terrorism, tyranny, and foreign interventions is to blame for the region's recurrent crises. The book's policy recommendations include empowering grassroots activists, constraining coercive autocrats, and inspire youths to retain a modicum of hope for the future.

=== Views on Palestine ===
Baghdadi is a prominent advocate for Palestinian rights, particularly supporting a one-state solution. He argues that a two-state solution is both unworkable and undesirable, suggesting that the only way forward is for Palestinians and Israelis to coexist as equal citizens within a single state. He views the two-state solution as a framework of partition and domination rooted in ethnic nationalism. Looking toward the future, he proposes another paradigm focused on integration, equality, inclusivity, and coexistence. He considers the fight for the Palestinian cause to be intrinsically linked with the fight against tyranny throughout the region. He also emphasizes the need to oppose violence and antisemitism, noting that both harm the cause.

=== The Kawaakibi Foundation ===
Baghdadi cofounded the human rights organisation Kawaakibi Foundation, named after Abd al-Rahman al-Kawakibi. He also contributes to its podcast, the Arab Tyrant Manual. Under Kawaakibi, he created "The Jamal Khashoggi Disinfo Monitor" to analyze disinformation networks and strategies used by governmental and non-governmental entities, aiming to educate the public about these threats.

=== Other contributions ===
Baghdadi features in The Dissident, a movie following the aftermath of the assassination of Jamal Khashoggi, with whom he collaborated. He is a fellow of Civita and has written extensively about policy, religion, and radicalization for Norwegian media.

== Security threats ==
In May 2019, Baghdadi was informed by Norwegian security services that a credible threat existed against his life due to his outspoken criticism of the Saudi Arabian government following the murder of Jamal Khashoggi. The threat had been revealed by the CIA to the intelligence service of Norway, who took Baghdadi into police protection.
