= Clementine Cohn =

German author

- Born: 22 April 1861; Breslau, Kingdom of Prussia
- Writing career
- Pen name: C. Berg, Clemens Berg
- Language: German

Clementine Cohn (born 22 April 1861) was a German author. She was born into an old Jewish family in Breslau. Cohn published her works under the pen name C. Berg.

== Publications ==
- Der Herr Hofprediger hat gesagt... und Anderes. Moderne Zeitbilder. Berlin: S. Cronbach. 1892.
- Der Mitgiftdoktor. Ein Bild aus der Gegenwart. Berlin: S. Cronbach. 1892.
