= Civita (think tank) =

Norwegian liberal think tank

- Established: 2003
- Focus: increased knowledge about and support for liberal values and solutions
- Managing Director: Kristin Clemet
- Address: Akersgaten 20 N-0158; Oslo, Norway
- Location: Oslo, Norway
- Coordinates: 59.9126°N 10.7409°E
- Interactive map of Civita
- Website: www.civita.no

Civita is a Norwegian liberal think tank which gains support from, among others, the Confederation of Norwegian Enterprise. In the beginning, it was led by Terje Svabø, but prominent Conservative Party politician Kristin Clemet took over on November 16, 2006, after having central roles in many projects.

The organization works to promote the value of individualism and a free market economy. It functions as a network of people with different political affiliation from different sectors of society (academia, business, media, organizations and politics). The organization spreads its message through seminars, lectures, research, and book publications.

== Leadership ==
- Kristin Clemet – Managing Director
- David Hansen – Director
- Therese Thomassen – Communication Advisor
- İyad el-Baghdadi, fellow

== See also ==
- Stiftelsen Manifest
- LibLab
