= Liberal Research Institute (Norway) =

Political organization

Liberal Science Institute (Norwegian: Liberalt forskningsinstitutt, often abbreviated as LIFO) is a Norwegian libertarian organisation that was established in 1988. It does not organise any activity itself, but it gives financial support to the market liberal think-tanks Civita and Liberal Laboratory Foundation, as well as the liberal conservative periodical Minerva.
