= Frantz Bergs =

18th-century Swedish goldsmith

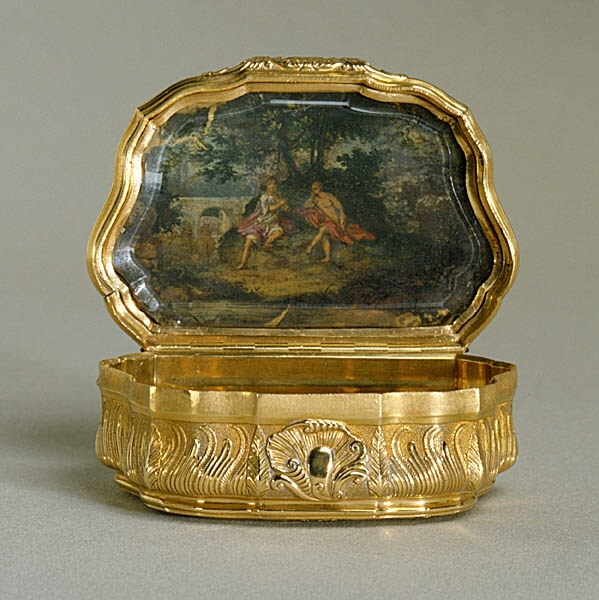
A gold box designed by Bergs.

Frantz Bergs (c. 1697–1787) was a Swedish goldsmith. His gold boxes are in the permanent collections of the Nationalmuseum and the Victoria and Albert Museum. He was the father of Swedish silversmith Julius Marianus Bergs (1741–1804).
