= Nella Berg =

Finnish ice hockey player (born 2005)

- Born: 10 February 2005 (age 21) Rymättylä, Finland
- Height: 5 ft 9 in (175 cm)
- Weight: 168 lb (76 kg; 12 st 0 lb)
- Position: Defense
- Shoots: Left
- SDHL team Former teams: Luleå HF; TPS Naiset; HPK Kiekkonaiset
- National team: Finland
- Playing career: 2018–present

Nella Berg (born 10 February 2005) is a Finnish professional ice hockey player for Luleå HF of the Swedish Women's Hockey League (SDHL) and a member of Finland women's national ice hockey team. She previously played for TPS and HPK of the Auroraliiga.

== Playing career ==
Berg began her ice hockey career for TPS Naiset of the Auroraliiga. On 20 January 2024, she was loaned to HPK Kiekkonaiset for two games during the 2023–24 season. During the 2024–25 season, she recorded four goals and five assists in 24 regular season games.

On 21 November 2025, she signed with HPK for the 2025–26 season. During her first full season with HPK she recorded five goals and six assists in 26 regular season games.

On 9 May 2026, she signed with Luleå HF of the SDHL.

== International play ==
Medal record

Representing Finland

World U18 Championship
Bronze medal – third place	2022 United States	

On 18 May 2022, Berg was selected to represent Finland at the 2022 IIHF World Women's U18 Championship and won a bronze medal.

On 21 October 2026, she was selected to represent Finland at the 2026–27 Women's Euro Hockey Tour (EHT), replacing the injured Hannele Tarkiainen. Following her performance at the EHT, she was selected to represent Finland at the 2026 IIHF Women's World Championship, where she will make her senior national team debut.

== Personal life ==
Berg is the daughter of former professional ice hockey player Aki Berg who played 606 games in the National Hockey League (NHL).

== Career statistics ==
=== Regular season and playoffs ===
			Regular season					Playoffs
Season	Team	League	GP	G	A	Pts	PIM	GP	G	A	Pts	PIM
2017–18	TPS	Mestis	5	1	0	1	0	—	—	—	—	—
2018–19	TPS	NSML	5	0	0	0	0	—	—	—	—	—
2019–20	TPS	NSML	5	0	0	0	0	—	—	—	—	—
2020–21	TPS	NSML	12	0	1	1	0	2	0	0	0	0
2021–22	TPS	NSML	18	0	4	4	0	7	0	2	2	0
2022–23	TPS	NSML	2	0	0	0	2	—	—	—	—	—
2023–24	TPS	NSML	12	2	1	3	2	—	—	—	—	—
2023–24	HPK	NSML	2	0	0	0	0	—	—	—	—	—
2024–25	TPS	NSML	24	4	5	9	8	4	1	2	3	0
2025–26	HPK	NSML	26	5	6	11	4	16	1	2	3	2
NSML totals			106	11	17	28	16	29	2	6	8	2

=== International ===
Year	Team	Event	Result	GP	G	A	Pts	PIM
2022	Finland	U18	3rd place, bronze medalist(s)	5	0	0	0	0
2023	Finland	U18	4th	5	0	1	1	0
Junior totals				10	0	1	1	0
