= Guri Berg =

Norwegian artist and sculptor (born 1963)

Guri Berg sculpture

Guri Berg (born 26 January 1963) is a Norwegian artist and sculptor.

The daughter of a maverick banker, Guri was born in Trondheim and grew up in Honningsvåg, a small fishing village on the North Cape of Norway. While her father, Erling Berg, established economic foundations for the fishermen in the northern rural areas of Norway, Guri was early exposed to creative activities by her mother Herfrid, a professional tailor.

Guri Berg is perhaps best known for her stoneware sculpture portraits of world natives and her stone-quarry work. Her work often combines art with technology, for example by using mathematical filter-functions as a basis for a series of large oil paintings. Sketches for her later sculptures were often designed and processed using a computer. Previously, she worked in San Francisco and nearby Silicon Valley for almost ten years, and has received several official commissions, one of which is the largest sculpture by a European female artist; a 110-ton silica concrete monument. Most recently she has been working on a sculpture series in a stone quarry in Estremoz, Portugal, and at the world's foremost stoneware foundry in Serbia.

Guri Berg studied sculpting, painting, and interior architecture for 13 years, including five years at the National Academy of Fine Arts in Oslo, Norway, where she received her degree in sculpting. Berg has received several awards for her work.
