= Gordon Berg =

American politician

Arne Gordon Berg (May 29, 1927 – May 25, 2013) was an American farmer and politician.

Berg was born in Starkweather, North Dakota. He was the son of Peder and Kristina (Christina Fluge) Berg.

Berg and his wife farmed on the family farm in Ramsey County, North Dakota (1952-1976). Berg served in the North Dakota House of Representatives (1977-1991) as a Democrat. He was involved with water issues.

He married Beth Elaine Wyman in 1947. They were the parents of five children. He was a member of St. Olaf Lutheran Church, Elks Lodge, Sons of Norway, Eagles Lodge and The Crofton Lodge. He died in Devils Lake, North Dakota.
