= Christine Berg =

American radiation oncologist

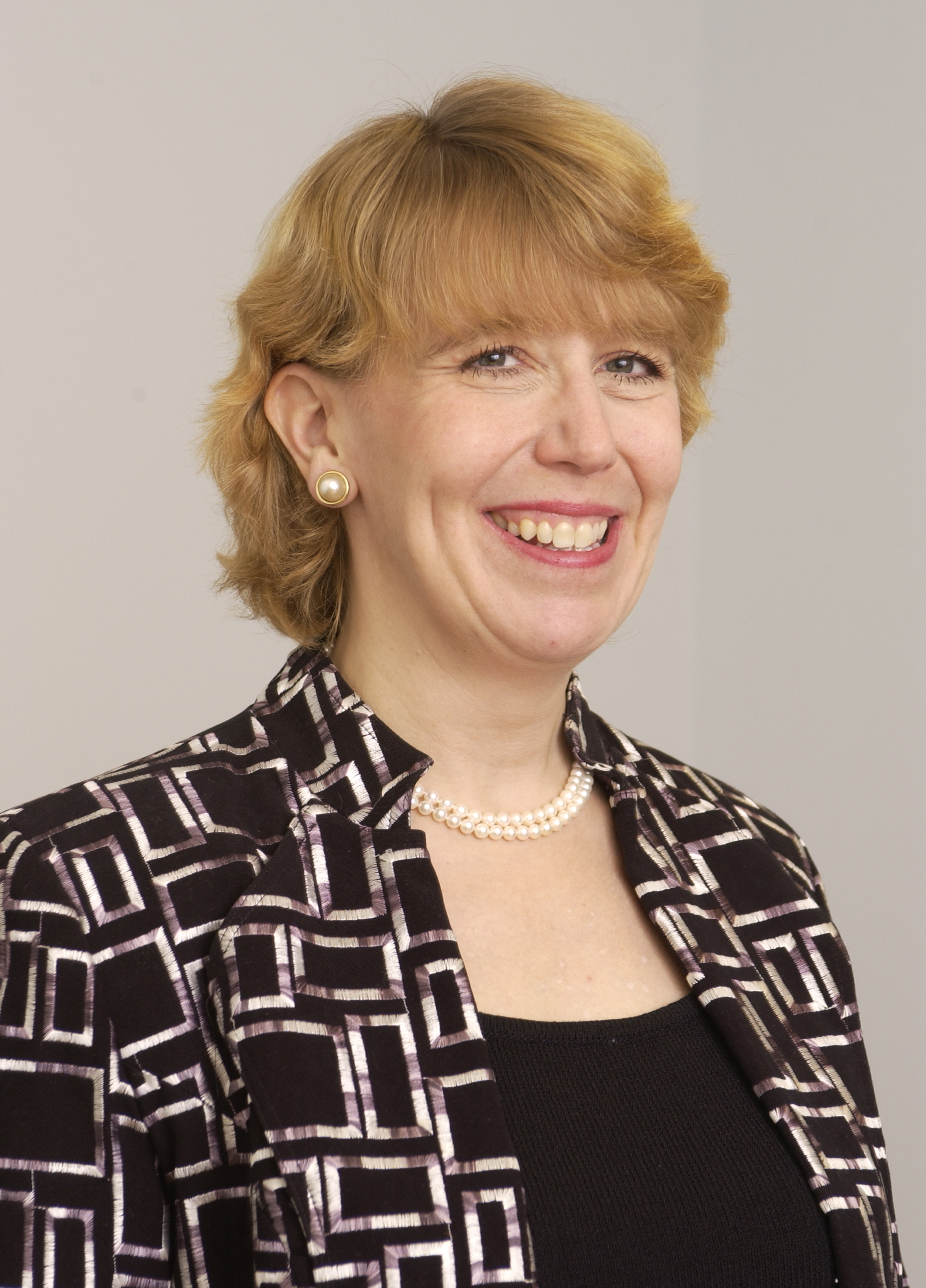
- Berg in 2004
- Education: Northwestern University School of Medicine
- Scientific career
- Fields: Radiation oncology, cancer prevention
- Workplaces: National Cancer Institute

Christine Dorothy Berg is an American radiation oncologist and physician-scientist who was chief of the early detection research group at the National Cancer Institute.

== Life ==
Berg completed a M.D. at the Northwestern University School of Medicine. She completed a residency in internal medicine from 1977 to 1981 at the McGaw Medical Center. Berg conducted a fellowship in hematology and medical oncology from 1981 to 1984 at the National Institutes of Health Clinical Center. She was a resident in radiation oncology from 1984 to 1986 with MedStar Health.

As of 2004, Berg was chief of the early detection research group in the division of cancer prevention at the National Cancer Institute. In 2010, she was co-lead of the National Lung Screening Trial. Berg retired from NCI in November 2012. In 2019, Berg was recognized by Marquis Who's Who for her leadership in the field of radiation oncology, and received the Albert Nelson Marquis Lifetime Achievement Award.
