= Grégoire Berg =

French footballer (1896-1944)

Personal information
- Date of birth: 31 March 1896
- Place of birth: Rouen, France
- Date of death: 24 August 1944 (aged 48)
- Place of death: Paris, France
- Position: Defender

Senior career*
Years	Team	Apps	(Gls)
1921–1923	SC Red Star Strasbourg		

International career
1922	France	1	(0)
- * Club domestic league appearances and goals

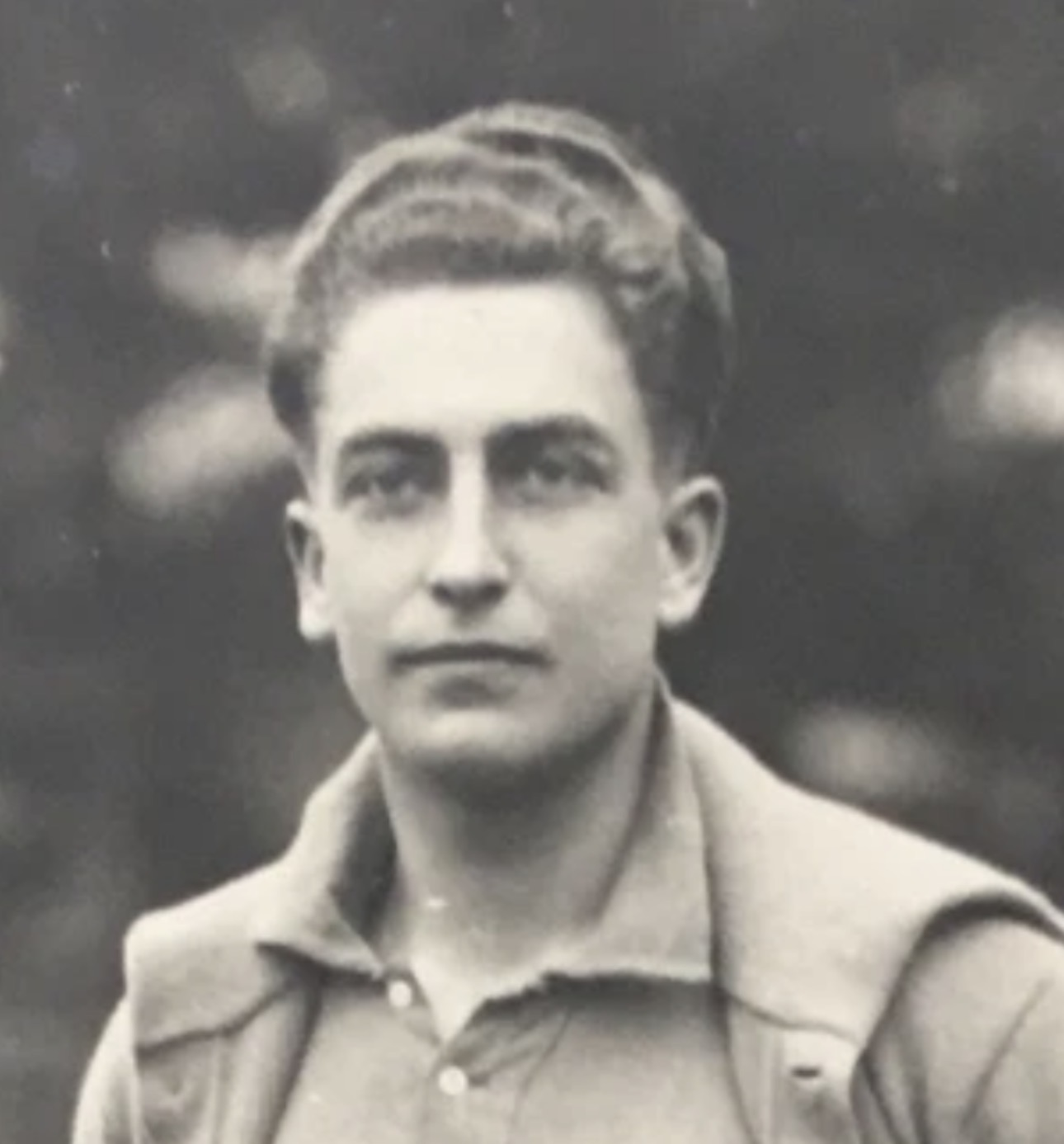
French international footballer Gregoire Berg

Grégoire Berg (31 March 1896 – 24 August 1944) was a French footballer who played for SC Red Star Strasbourg. He was part of the France national team, playing one match in 1922. A member of the French Resistance during the Second World War, who avoided deportation despite being Jewish (albeit non-practicising, and the husband and parent of Christians) Berg was arrested and executed by the Germans just before the Liberation of Paris on 24 August 1944.
