= Conservative Students' Association (Oslo) =

Norwegian students' association

The Conservative Students' Association (Norwegian: Den Konservative Studenterforening) is a Norwegian students' association of the University of Oslo, located at Majorstuen, Slemdalsveien 7 together with the Norwegian Students' Society. It is politically conservative and is associated with the Conservative Party and the European Democrat Students. It was founded by Vilhelm Aubert on 16 March 1891, and is Norway's oldest students' association.
