= Nathaniel Berg =

Guam physician

Nathaniel Benjamin Berg, is a former president of the Guam Medical Society. He was raised the son of two physicians, Robert and Dorothy Berg. He is the host of a radio talk show discussing medicine and timely local controversial topics in the Pacific. Berg has been vocal in calling for better governance of the Guam Memorial Hospital. Berg has asked for audits and called for strict oversight of Guam's only public hospital.

Berg is the owner and radiologist in chief of Guam Radiology Consultants. He is a graduate of the Tufts University School of Medicine and obtained his bachelor's degree from the University of Massachusetts Amherst. Berg was an assistant clinical instructor in radiology for the Uniformed Services University of the Health Sciences while he was a chief resident in radiology at Walter Reed Army Medical Center. He served in the Army for 13 years leaving for private practice after achieving the rank of Major.

Berg is a member of several organizations to include the American College of Radiology, American Roentgen Ray Society, and Radiologic Society of North America.

As the host of an AM talk radio program on News Talk K57, Berg also provides insight into procedures, illnesses, advancements, and other topics related to the medical field. He also contributes numerous stories to the Sorensen Media Group of stations as a Medical sports correspondent. Berg's expertise and knowledge is sought after by members of the community and the media.
