= John Berg (actor) =

American actor

- Born: John Edward Berg; April 5, 1949; Wichita Falls, Texas, U.S.
- Died: December 15, 2007 (aged 58); Van Nuys, Los Angeles, California, U.S.
- Education: Wichita Falls High School; University of Chicago; Tulane University
- Occupation: Actor

John Edward Berg (April 5, 1949 – December 15, 2007) was an American actor. He was perhaps best known for his role in the film Star Trek: Nemesis (2002). Apart from acting, he held many jobs during his life.

== Life and career ==
He appeared in several television roles, including Law & Order, The Practice, Passions, The Bold and the Beautiful, House, Boston Legal, NCIS, Monk and others. He had only one film credit, however, playing a Romulan senator in Star Trek Nemesis.

Berg committed suicide in his home by turning on a hibachi grill in his bedroom and succumbing to its carbon monoxide fumes. He was 58 years old.

== Filmography ==
Year	Title	Role	Notes
1998	Law & Order	Dr. Weiss	1 episode
2002	The Guardian	Robbie Gersh	1 episode
2002	The Practice	Illitch	1 episode
2002	Star Trek Nemesis	Romulan Senator	
2002	The Jamie Kennedy Experiment		1 episode
2003	Lucky		1 episode
2003	The Handler	Alex	1 episode
2004	The Division	Jim Miller	1 episode
2004	Summerland	Max Winters	1 episode
2005	House	Dr. Prather	1 episode
2005	Kitchen Confidential	Hot dog customer	1 episode
2005	Boston Legal	Judge Hober	1 episode
2005	NCIS	General Grant	1 episode (s3e4)
2006	Brothers & Sisters	University President	1 episode
2007	Monk	Guest Alfred	1 episode
