= Jan Berg (Finnish footballer) =

Finnish footballer (born 1985)

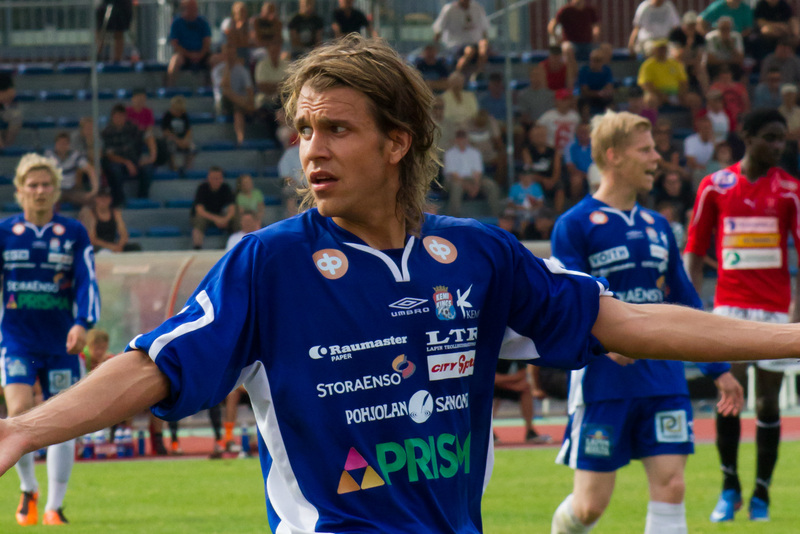
- Berg with PS Kemi in 2011

Personal information
- Date of birth: 22 May 1985 (age 41)
- Place of birth: Siilinjärvi, Finland
- Height: 1.83 m (6 ft 0 in)
- Position: Defender

Senior career*
| Years | Team | Apps | (Gls) |
| 2003–2005 | KuPS | 14 | (0) |
| 2006–2007 | Jippo | 47 | (1) |
| 2008 | KPV | 24 | (2) |
| 2009–2010 | VPS | 30 | (0) |
| 2011 | PS Kemi | 23 | (0) |
| 2012 | KuPS | 8 | (0) |
| 2013 | ÍA | 6 | (0) |
| 2014 | Jippo | 21 | (0) |
- * Club domestic league appearances and goals as of 1 August 2012

Jan Berg (born 22 May 1985) is a Finnish retired footballer.

== Career statistics ==
As of 1 September 2024.

Appearances and goals by club, season and competition
| Club | Season | League | | | Cup | | League cup | | Europe | | Total | |
| Club | Season | Division | Apps | Goals | Apps | Goals | Apps | Goals | Apps | Goals | Apps | Goals |
|---|---|---|---|---|---|---|---|---|---|---|---|---|
| KuPS | 2003 | Veikkausliiga | 4 | 0 | – | | – | | – | | 4 | 0 |
| KuPS | 2004 | Ykkönen | 9 | 0 | – | | – | | – | | 9 | 0 |
| KuPS | 2005 | Veikkausliiga | 1 | 0 | – | | – | | – | | 1 | 0 |
| KuPS | Total | | 14 | 0 | 0 | 0 | 0 | 0 | 0 | 0 | 14 | 0 |
| Jippo | 2006 | Ykkönen | | | | | | | | | | |
| Jippo | 2007 | Ykkönen | | | | | | | | | | |
| Jippo | Total | | 47 | 1 | 0 | 0 | 0 | 0 | 0 | 0 | 47 | 1 |
| KPV | 2008 | Ykkönen | 24 | 2 | – | | – | | – | | 24 | 2 |
| VPS | 2009 | Veikkausliiga | 25 | 0 | 0 | 0 | 7 | 1 | – | | 32 | 1 |
| VPS | 2010 | Veikkausliiga | 5 | 0 | 0 | 0 | 0 | 0 | – | | 5 | 0 |
| VPS | Total | | 30 | 0 | 0 | 0 | 7 | 1 | 0 | 0 | 37 | 1 |
| Haka | 2011 | Veikkausliiga | 0 | 0 | 0 | 0 | 1 | 0 | – | | 1 | 0 |
| PS Kemi | 2011 | Ykkönen | 23 | 0 | – | | – | | – | | 23 | 0 |
| KuPS | 2012 | Veikkausliiga | 5 | 0 | 1 | 0 | 1 | 0 | 1 (Note: Appearances in UEFA Europa League) | 0 | 8 | 0 |
| Jippo (loan) | 2012 | Ykkönen | 5 | 0 | – | | – | | – | | 5 | 0 |
| ÍA | 2013 | Besta deild karla | 6 | 0 | 1 | 0 | 6 | 0 | – | | 13 | 0 |
| Jippo | 2014 | Ykkönen | 21 | 0 | – | | – | | – | | 21 | 0 |
| Career total | | | 175 | 3 | 2 | 0 | 15 | 1 | 1 | 0 | 193 | 4 |
