= Odd Berg (ship-owner born 1894) =

Norwegian ship-owner

Odd Berg (6 December 1894 – 1973) was a Norwegian ship-owner. He operated his own company, Odd Bergs Tankrederi, from 1929, and during the Second World War he was an assisting director of Nortraship. He was active in the Conservative Party and the Norwegian Shipowners' Association, and was the first chairman of Libertas.

== Early life and career ==
He was born in Kristiania as a son of civil servant Realf Martinius Berg (1863–1945) and Alvilde Christiane Gabrielsen (1865–1949). In 1919 he married merchant's daughter Louise Marie Heiberg Albretsen.

He finished Kristiania Commerce School in 1912. He started his career in the offices of Fred. Olsen, where he worked until 1914. He then worked as a shipbroker's assistant in Liverpool and Leith 1915, then back in Norway in Jac. Lindvig from 1916. He became a co-owner in the company S. Ugelstad & Co. in 1917. He was also a board member of Langesunds Mekaniske Verksted from 1921 to 1924, and deputy board member of the Norwegian Shipowners' Association from 1927.

== Later career ==
He started his own company in 1929, Odd Bergs Tankrederi, where he worked as manager. He was a board member of the Norwegian Shipowners' Association and 1931 to 1933 and 1945 to 1963, from 1945 to 1947 in the central board. During the Second World War, he was the assisting director of Nortraship in London from 1942 to 1945. He was the Shipowners' Association representative in the Skipsfartens Arbeidsgiverforing from 1945 to 1947, and also a board member of the Nordisk Defence Club from 1946 to 1958.

Outside of shipping, Berg is best known as a co-founder and the first chairman of Libertas, serving from 1947 to 1952. Politically, he belonged to the Conservative Party. He was a board member of the local party branch in Ullern from 1908 to 1923, and deputy member of Aker municipal council from 1931 to 1934. He chaired the board of Norges Handels- og Sjøfartstidende from 1963 to 1967, chaired the supervisory council of Globus and was a supervisory council member of Norske Liv from 1945 to 1960, Morgenbladet from 1945 to 1961 and council member of Norges Eksportråd 1945 to 1948.

He was decorated as a Knight, First Class of the Order of St. Olav (1954) and of the Order of Vasa. He also received the King's Medal for Service in the Cause of Freedom. He died in 1973.

Business positions
Preceded by position created	Chairman of Libertas; 1947–1952	Succeeded by
