= Odd Berg (ship-owner born 1907) =

Norwegian ship-owner

Odd Berg (9 July 1907 – 11 September 2005) was a Norwegian ship-owner.

He was born in Trondhjem as a son of consul Harald Berg (1881–1951) and Adele Sørensen (1881–1938). His father was a supervisor for the Northern Norwegian routes of Bergenske Dampskibselskab and Nordenfjeldske Dampskibselskab, whereas his mother was the daughter of a merchant in Gibostad. Odd's father took over this business, and the family moved to Tromsø in 1914. Odd Berg finished his secondary education in 1926, took Kristiania Commerce School in 1927, the average adjuster exam in 1928 and the cand.oecon. degree at the Royal Frederick University in 1930. He then studied three years abroad. From 1933 to 1942 he worked as the manager of Tromsø Bunkerdepot. In 1937 he married Trinelise Hansen.

In 1945 he registered his own company, eponymously named. Tromsø Bunkerdepot became a daughter company. Other daughter companies included Bergskip, Bulkskip, Berg Betong, Tromsø Fiskeindustri, Finnmark Bunkerdepot and Nordkapp Fiskeindustri. The first major vessel was contracted in 1954. The acquisition in 1965 of the tanker Arctic Propane built by Moss Verft was a turning point, as the company started concentrating on ships with diving gear. The vessel "Arctic Surveyor" (the first DP DSV with her first contract on the Ekofisk to Emden pipeline using hydro-coupling tie-ins progressing to Hyperbaric welding of piplenes ) and later the Arctic Seal was used for this purpose after the 1979–1980 Ixtoc I oil spill. Arctic Seal was also the first vessel to, in 1978, perform hyperbaric welding with dynamic positioning.

Odd Berg also had consular missions for Spain, the Netherlands and Italy. He was an important person in Norwegian employers' associations; as a central board member of the Norwegian Employers' Confederation, board member of the Federation of Norwegian Industries and the Norwegian Shipbrokers' Association. He was also a board member of Tromsø Port Authority and chaired the supervisory council of Tromsø Forretningsbank.

He was decorated as a Commander of the Order of Merit of the Italian Republic, a Knight of the Order of Orange-Nassau and of the Order of St. Olav. He died in 2005, aged 98.
