= Karin Berg =

American music executive

- Born: January 5, 1936; St. Louis, Missouri, U.S.
- Died: October 25, 2006 (aged 70); Manhattan, New York City, U.S.
- Employer(s): Elektra Records, Warner Records, Nonesuch Records

Karin Berg (January 5, 1936 – October 5, 2006) was an American music industry executive who signed several notable artists to record labels including Elektra, Warner and Nonesuch Records. In her role in the artists and repertoire (A&R) division, she signed or worked closely with artists such as Television, R.E.M., the B-52s and Dire Straits. She also wrote for Rolling Stone.

== Early life ==
Berg was born in St. Louis, Missouri, in 1936. She lived on Horatio Street for several years.

== Death ==
Berg died after a long illness on October 25, 2006, aged 70. Her memorial service was held at St. Mark's Church in Manhattan's East Village. Composer Philip Glass opened the ceremony by playing his composition "Opening" on piano. Berg moved to New York City in the 1950s, and had been suffering from myositis for around a decade prior to her death.

=== Legacy ===
Upon R.E.M.'s induction into the Rock and Roll Hall of Fame in 2007, its lead singer Michael Stipe honored "the memory and legacy or two of our greatest co-conspirators: Ian Copeland and the great Karin Berg."
