= Gunner Berg =

Norwegian politician

Gunner Berg (22 November 1764 – 19 August 1827) was a Norwegian priest, writer and politician.

He was born in Stjørdalen. He finished his secondary education in Throndhjem in 1782, and graduated with the cand.theol. degree in 1786. He was hired as a vicar at Lenvik Church in 1792. In 1881 he was promoted to dean of Senjen prosti, after one year he became vicar at Ibestad Church. He was known for his historical and topographical writings, which have been used as sources by later historians.

He was elected to the Norwegian Parliament in 1818, representing the constituency of Finmarkens Amt (Troms county did not exist until 1866). However, he never got the chance to actually meet in Parliament, due to illness. His replacement was Hans Christoffer Klæboe. Berg died in August 1827.
