= Minerva (Norwegian periodical) =

Norwegian conservative periodical

Minerva is a Norwegian liberal conservative newspaper, publishing daily at minerva.no and quarterly through a periodical that was first published in 1924. It was started by members of the Conservative Students' association in Oslo.

The newspaper is primarily funded by subsciptions, and have more than 3400 subcribers as of 2026. It also receives press support from the Norwegian Media Authority, and has received other financial support through grants and projects from actors like Amediastiftelsen, the Liberal Science Institute and the Fritt Ord Foundation.

== Bibliography ==
- Elden, John; Dahlø, Rolf; Lindbekk, Tore (1955). Den Konservative Studenter–Forening 1891—1966. Conservative Student's association.
- Groth, Lars, ed. (1976). Minerviana gjennom 50 år. Conservative Students' Association. ISBN 82-990426-0-7.
- Løvhaug, Johannes W. (2007). Politikk som idékamp – Et intellektuelt gruppeportrett av Minerva-kretsen 1957—1972. Pax Forlag. ISBN 978-82-530-3046-3.
- Isaksen, Torbjørn R. (2008). Høyre om! – For en ny konservatisme. Cappelen Damm. ISBN 978-82-02-28322-3.
