= Niilo Tammisalo =

Finnish multi-sport athlete and sports influencer

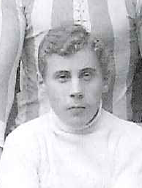
- Niilo Tammisalo with the Finnish Champion HJK football team in 1911.

Personal information
- Nickname: Palloprofessori "The Ball Professor"
- Born: Niilo Rudolf Ekbom; 15 October 1894 Helsinki, Grand Duchy of Finland
- Died: 5 February 1982 (aged 87) Helsinki, Finland
- Resting place: Hietaniemi Cemetery
- Height: 1.73 m (5 ft 8 in)
- Weight: 74 kg (163 lb)
Association football career
- Position: Goalkeeper
Senior career*
| Years | Team | Apps | (Gls) |
| 1910-1926 | HJK | | |
International career
| 1919-1923 | Finland | 29 | (0) |
- * Club domestic league appearances and goals
Bandy career
- Playing position: Forward
Senior career*
| Years | Team | Apps^{†} | (Gls)^{†} |
- HJK
National team
| | Finland | 7 | |
- * Senior club appearances and goals counted for the domestic league only. † Appearances (Goals).
Ice hockey career
- Position: Forward
- Played for: HJK Helsinki; Tampereen Palloilijat; Tampereen Ilves
- National team: Finland
- Playing career: 1928–1934

Niilo Rudolf Tammisalo (originally Ekbom; 15 October 1894 - 5 February 1982) was an influential figure in Finnish sports in the first half of the 20th century. He was a versatile athlete who represented Finland as a player with the national teams in football, ice hockey, and bandy; he was also on Finnish Champion teams in each of the three sports with domestic clubs. When his career as a player came to a close in the early 1930s, he dedicated himself to coaching, refereeing, teaching, and administrating sports organizations.

Tammisalo was a founding member of the Ilves Sports Club and won the Finnish Championship in ice hockey as head coach of Ilves in 1936 and 1937. He was the first chairman of Basketball Finland (1939-1943), served as head coach of the Finland national team (1937-38 & 1946), was a sports instructor and lecturer at the University of Helsinki (1938-1958), and served as a referee in international competitions for football, ice hockey, and bandy.

== Playing career ==
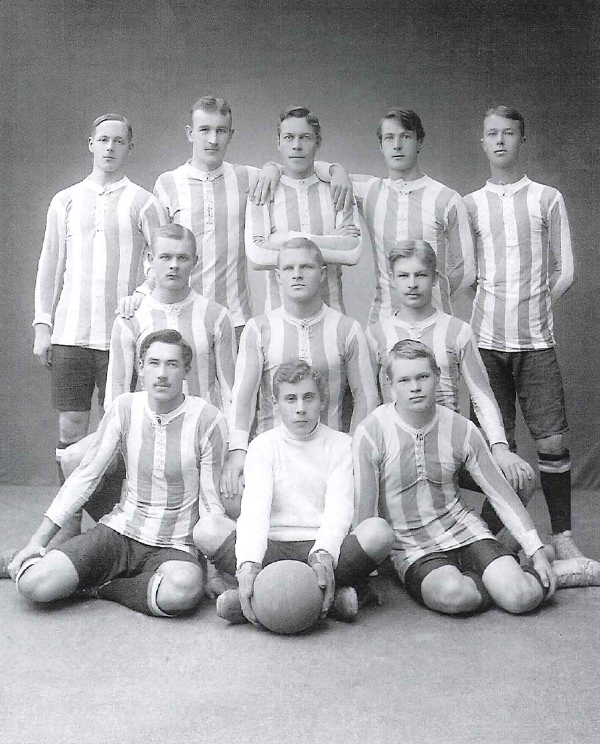
The 1911 HJK representative team, winners of the club's first Finnish Championship Cup. Goaltender Niilo Tammisalo is in the first row, center.

=== Football ===
Tammisalo played as goalkeeper at the semi-professional level with Helsingin Jalkapalloklubi (HJK). He began playing on the club's representative team in 1911, when he was 17 years old, and would remain loyal to HJK throughout his sixteen-season football career, helping them achieve seven Finnish Championship Cup victories (1911, 1912, 1917, 1918, 1919, 1923 and 1925). He is credited as the first Finnish goalkeeper to knock the ball away from the goal with his fist.

=== Bandy ===
Tammisalo was a four time Finnish Champion in bandy with HJK, in 1921, 1923, 1924 and 1928.

=== Ice hockey ===
Tammisalo was Finnish Champion in ice hockey while playing with HJK in 1929 and with Tampereen Palloilijat in 1931. While acting as captain and coach of the Tampereen Ilves he won Finnish Championship bronze in 1934.

== International play ==
=== Bandy ===
Tammisalo played in seven games with the Finnish men's national bandy team. He participated in the particularly significant match at the 1919 Finnish Winter Games, the first game in which players represented the recently independent nation Finland. The national team's roster was dominated by players from Viipurin Sudet and Tammisalo (from HJK) was one of only three players representing a different domestic club. The national team's match against the Swedish club IFK Uppsala resulted in a 4-1 victory that was described in the press as “one of the most amazing achievements of Finnish athletes.”

=== Ice hockey ===
Tammisalo is credited with one appearance representing Finland in international ice hockey competition, a three-game series of friendlies against the Swedish national team that were played in Stockholm in February 1933.

== Non-playing career ==
- 1914-1928: Member of the Board, HJK
- 1917-1919: Member of the Board, Football Association of Finland
- 1920: Published Jalkapallo: Käsikirja jalkapalloilijoille [Football: A Handbook for Football Players], the first comprehensive guide for association football written in Finnish
- 1922-1947: Coach and referee with the Football Association of Finland
- 1927-1928: Head coach of the Viipurin Reipas ice hockey team
- 1929-1937: Instructor at the Tampere Lyceum
- 10 April 1931: Founding member of the Ilves Sports Association
- 1931-1935: Chairperson of Ilves Sports Association
- 30 April 1931: Elected to the Board of the Finnish Ice Hockey Association
- 1931-1934: Captain-coach of the Tampereen Ilves ice hockey team
- 1934-1937: Head coach of the Tampereen Ilves ice hockey team ↳ Finnish Champion, 1936 and 1937 ↳ Finnish Championship silver, 1935
- 1936: Finnish representative to the International Ice Hockey Federation (IIHF) at the 1936 Winter Olympics
- 1938: Published Jalkapallotaito: miten opin pelaamaan ja opetan jalkapalloa [Football Skills: How I Learned to Play and Teach Football], used in Finland for decades as the principal textbook on coaching football
- 1938-1939: Head coach of the Finnish men's national football team (first tenure)
- 1938-1958: Professor of physical education in the Gymnastics Department at the University of Helsinki
- 1939-1943: Chairperson of Finnish Basketball Association
- 1941-1946: Member of the Board, HJK Sports Association
- 1946: Chairperson of the HJK Sports Association
- 1946: Head coach of the Finnish men's national football team (second tenure)
- 1949: Published Jääpallotaito [Bandy Skills], the first comprehensive guidebook for bandy written in Finnish
- 1952: Organized the basketball competition at the 1952 Summer Olympics in Helsinki

== Awards and honors ==
- Golden Cross of Merit of Finnish Sport
- Sports Legend of Helsinki, designated by the City of Helsinki on 12 June 2019 (Helsinki Day)
- Valmentajien Kunniagalleria (Finnish Hall of Coaching Excellence) inductee, 2017 (first class)
- Football Association of Finland
  - Golden Badge honouree
  - Finnish Football Hall of Fame inductee, 1993 (first class)
- Basketball Finland
  - Honorary President
  - Golden Badge honouree
  - Hall of Fame inductee, 2019
- Helsingin Jalkapalloklubi (HJK)
  - HJK Centennial All-Star Team, 2009
  - Hall of Fame inductee, 2015
