= Aurora Borealis Cup =

Finnish Championship trophy in women's ice hockey

Aurora Borealis Cup Aurora Borealis -malja (Finnish)
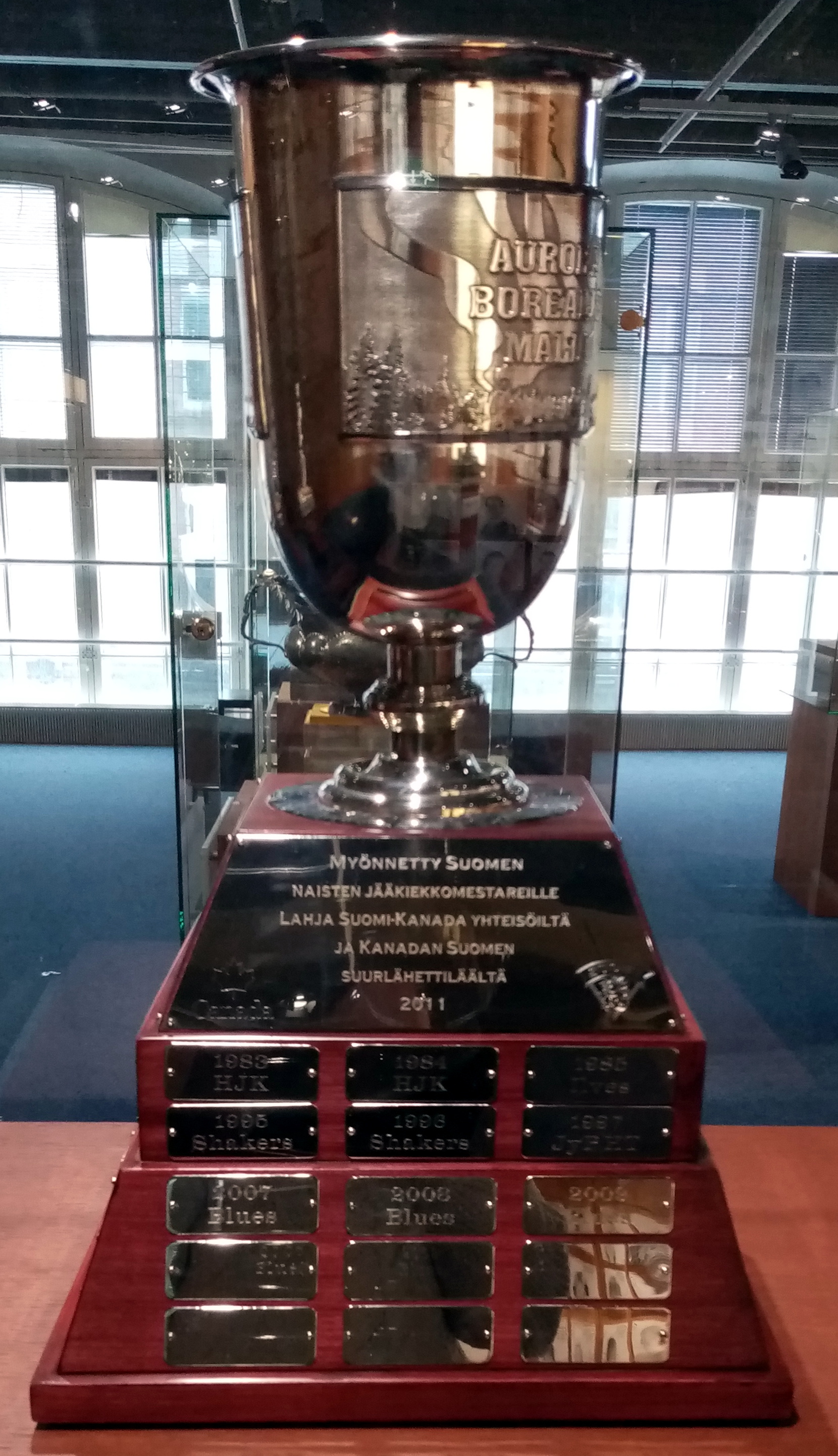
- Sport: Ice hockey
- Competition: Auroraliiga playoffs
- Nickname: Tyttö ('The Girl')
- Country: Finland
- Presented by: Finnish Ice Hockey Association

History
- First winner: HPK Hämeenlinna
- Most wins: Kiekko-Espoo (8)
- Most recent: Kiekko-Espoo, 2026

The Aurora Borealis Cup (Finnish: Aurora Borealis -malja) is the trophy awarded by the Finnish Ice Hockey Association to the victorious team of the Auroraliiga playoffs, the Finnish Champion in women's ice hockey.

== Project ==
Christopher Shapardanov, Canadian Ambassador to Finland, first conceived of the Aurora Borealis Cup in September 2009, after a visit to the Finnish Ice Hockey Museum (Finnish: Suomen Jääkiekkomuseo) in Tampere and conversation with Jyrki Lumme and Kimmo Leinonen, chairman of the Finnish Ice Hockey Museum Association (Finnish: Suomen Jääkiekkomuseoyhdistys ry). The project was motivated by a desire to honor the quality of play in Auroraliiga and as a symbol of support in the promotion of women's ice hockey.

The project was then commissioned through the fundraising efforts of the Finnish-Canadian community, with significant financial contributions from Osuuspankki. Several Canadian former players, including Sami Jo Small and Darren Boyko, contributed to fundraising efforts and other aspects of the project.

The design and manufacture was executed by Toronto-based Awardco. The completed Aurora Borealis Cup was presented by Ambassador Shapardanov and received by Kalervo Kummola, Chairman of the Finnish Ice Hockey Association, on 21 March 2011. An exact replica of the Aurora Borealis Cup was also given to the Suomen Jääkiekkomuseo, where it's on permanent display in a place of prominence opposite the original Kanada-malja.

=== Design ===
The design of the trophy pays homage to the natural and cultural similarities between Finland and Canada. Both Arctic nations are renowned for the ability to observe the Aurora Borealis, also called the Northern Lights, after which the cup is named. Likewise, the choice of materials celebrate the countries' natural affinity. The metal elements of the trophy are Canadian silver, the wood is maple, and a ring of labradorite circles the foot of the cup. The cup itself depicts the Northern Lights over a coniferous forest landscape. Text documenting the donation of the trophy is engraved in four languages on the upper tier of the base to highlight the official bilingualism of each country; the text appears in Finnish and Swedish, the official languages of Finland, and in English and French, the official languages of Canada. The lower tiers of the base feature 60 metal plates, originally intended to be engraved with the names of the champion teams until the plates were filled in 2070.

== Championship history ==
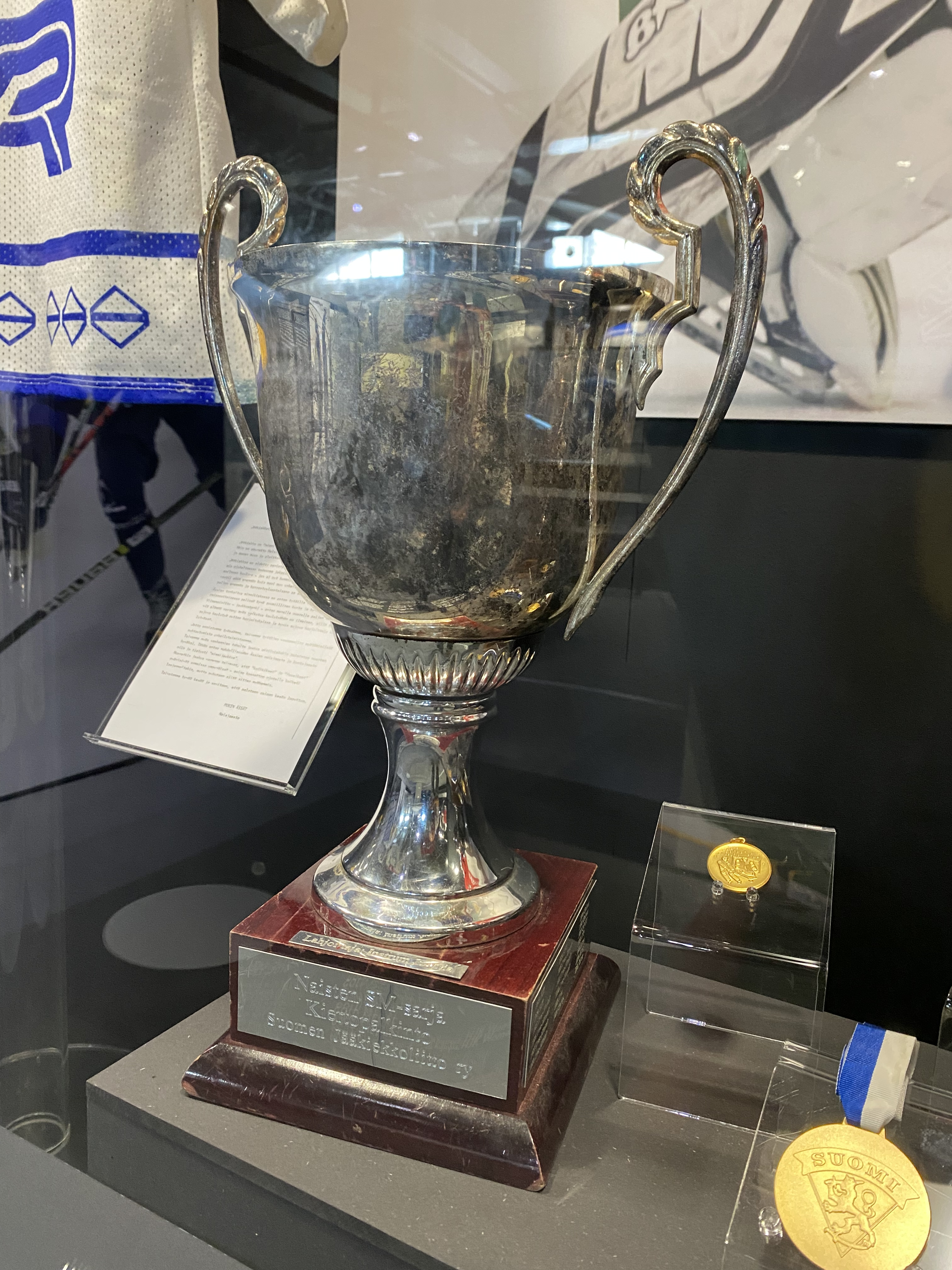
The Sammon -malja on display at the Suomen Jääkiekkomuseo in 2022

Prior to the introduction of the Aurora Borealis Cup, the Naisten SM-sarja champion received the Sammon -malja. The Sammon -malja was first awarded in 1983 at the conclusion of the inaugural Naisten SM-sarja season to Helsingin Jääkiekkoklubi (HJK) and it was used continuously through the 2009–10 season. The trophy was retired in the spring of 2011 and is now on display at the Suomen Jääkiekkomuseo.

As champions of the 2011 Naisten SM-sarja playoffs, HPK Hämeenlinna were the first team to receive the Aurora Borealis Cup.

=== Finnish Champions by season ===
Notes: As they are various names of the same franchise, the records of Espoon Kiekkoseura (EKS), Espoo Blues, and Espoo United are all included in the history of Kiekko-Espoo. The club Jyväskylän Palloilijat Hockey Team (JyP HT) updated its name to JYP in 1997 and the record of JyP HT is included in the history of JYP.

Season	(gold) Champion	(silver) Runner-up	(bronze) Third Place
Sammon -malja
1983	HJK Helsinki	Ilves Tampere	EVU Vantaa
1984	HJK Helsinki	EVU Vantaa	Ilves Tampere
1985	Ilves Tampere	EVU Vantaa	HJK Helsinki
1986	Ilves Tampere	HJK Helsinki	Vaasan Sport
1987	Ilves Tampere	EVU Vantaa	Shakers Kerava
1988	Ilves Tampere	EVU Vantaa	HIFK Helsinki
1989	EVU Vantaa	Ilves Tampere	HIFK Helsinki
1990	Ilves Tampere	EVU Vantaa	SaiPa Lappeenranta
1991	Ilves Tampere	Shakers Kerava	EKS Espoo
1992	Ilves Tampere	Shakers Kerava	EKS Espoo
1993	Ilves Tampere	Shakers Kerava	Kiekko-Espoo
1994	Shakers Kerava	Ilves Tampere	Kiekko-Espoo
1995	Shakers Kerava	Ilves Tampere	KalPa Kuopio
1996	Shakers Kerava	Oulun Kärpät	KalPa Kuopio
1997	JyP HT Jyväskylä	Shakers Kerava	Kiekko-Espoo
1998	JYP Jyväskylä	Oulun Kärpät	Kiekko-Espoo
1999	Espoo Blues	JYP Jyväskylä	Ilves Tampere
2000	Espoo Blues	Oulun Kärpät	Ilves Tampere
2001	Espoo Blues	Oulun Kärpät	Ilves Tampere
2002	Espoo Blues	IHK Helsinki	Oulun Kärpät
2003	Espoo Blues	Oulun Kärpät	Ilves Tampere
2004	Espoo Blues	Ilves Tampere	Oulun Kärpät
2005	Espoo Blues	Ilves Tampere	Oulun Kärpät
2006	Ilves Tampere	Oulun Kärpät	Espoo Blues
2007	Espoo Blues	Oulun Kärpät	IHK Helsinki
2008	Espoo Blues	Ilves Tampere	Oulun Kärpät
2009	Espoo Blues	Ilves Tampere	HPK Hämeenlinna
2010	Ilves Tampere	Espoo Blues	HPK Hämeenlinna
Aurora Borealis Cup
2011	HPK Hämeenlinna	Ilves Tampere	Oulun Kärpät
2012	Oulun Kärpät	Ilves Tampere	HPK Hämeenlinna
2013	Espoo Blues	JYP Jyväskylä	Oulun Kärpät
2014	Espoo Blues	JYP Jyväskylä	HPK Hämeenlinna
2015	Espoo Blues	JYP Jyväskylä	Ilves Tampere
2016	JYP Jyväskylä	HPK Hämeenlinna	Espoo Blues
2017	Oulun Kärpät	Espoo United	KalPa Kuopio
2018	Oulun Kärpät	Ilves Tampere	Team Kuortane
2019	Espoo Blues	Ilves Tampere	Oulun Kärpät
2020	Post-season cancelled due to COVID-19 pandemic. (Note: The 2019–20 Naisten Liiga post-season was cancelled by the Finnish Ice Hockey Association on 12 March 2020, citing public health concerns regarding the COVID-19 pandemic. The Aurora Borealis Cup Finnish Championship finals, between Kiekko-Espoo and KalPa, and the Finnish Championship bronze medal game, between Team Kuortane and Kärpät, were scheduled to begin on 14 March 2020. With the cancellation of the season, neither the Aurora Borealis Cup nor any Finnish Championship medals were awarded for the 2019–20 season.)		
2021	Kiekko-Espoo	KalPa Kuopio	HIFK Helsinki
2022	Kiekko-Espoo	HIFK Helsinki	Oulun Kärpät
2023	HIFK Helsinki	Kiekko-Espoo	KalPa Kuopio
2024	HIFK Helsinki	Kiekko-Espoo	KalPa Kuopio
2025	Kiekko-Espoo	HPK Hämeenlinna	Ilves Tampere
2026	Kiekko-Espoo	HPK Hämeenlinna	Ilves Tampere
