= HJK =

HJK may stand for:

- Helsingin Jalkapalloklubi (HJK Helsinki), an association football club, Finland
- Helsingin Jalkapalloklubi (women), an association football club, Helsinki, Finland
- Helsingin Jalkapalloklubi (ice hockey), Finnish ice hockey club
- Helsingin Jääkiekkoklubi (HJK Helsinki), Finnish ice hockey club
- Hærens Jegerkommando, Norwegian special forces unit
