= 1932–33 SM-sarja season =

Finnish ice hockey season

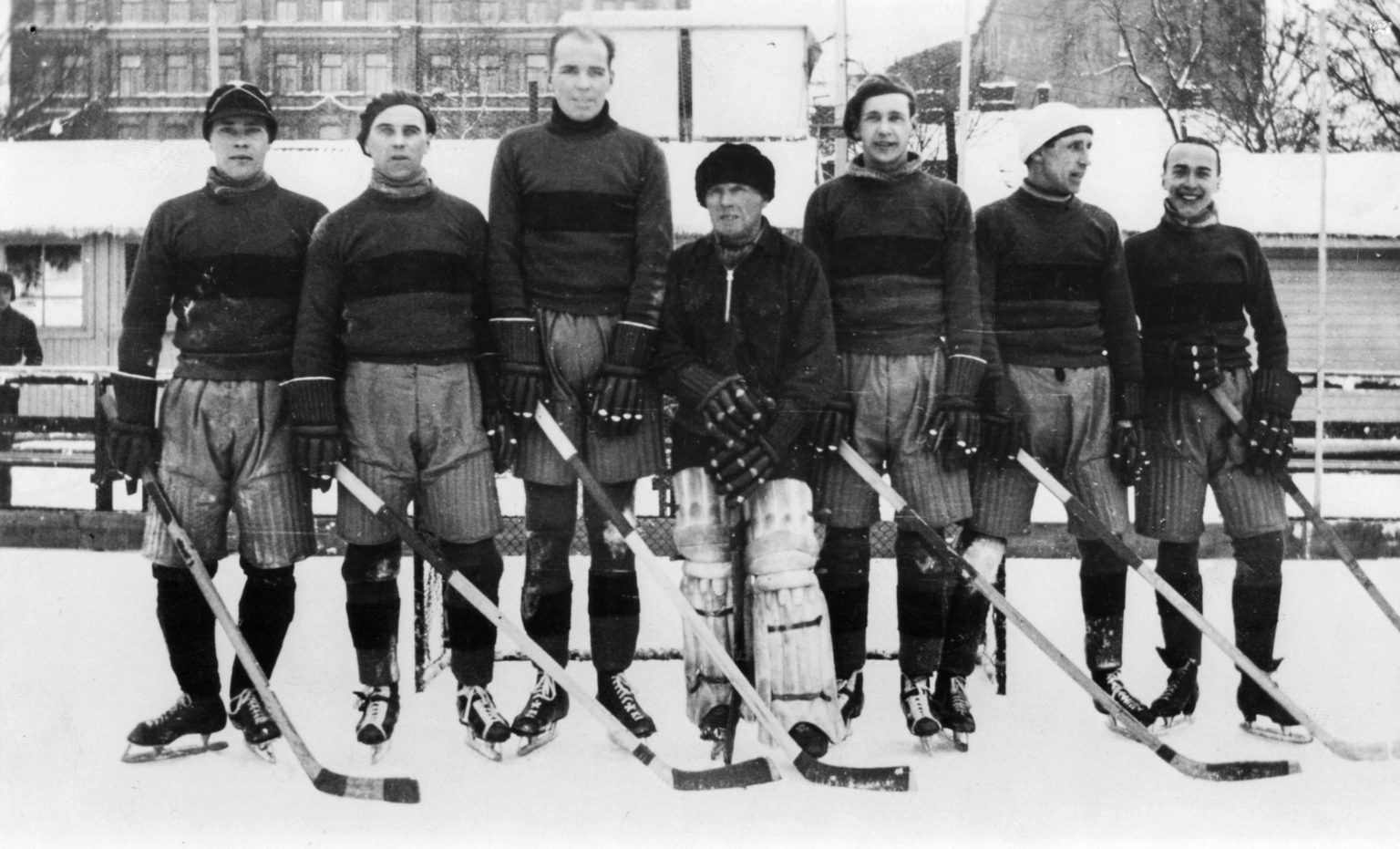
Finnish Champions Helsingfors SK

The 1932–1933 SM-sarja season would become the last one played as a Cup series. The season also had the smallest number of participating teams as there was 4 teams from 2 cities.

== Semifinals ==
Away	Score	Home	Score
Ilves Tampere	2	Helsingfors SK	5

Away	Score	Home	Score	Notes
HPS Helsinki	3	HJK Helsinki	4	OT

HSK and HJK advance to Final.

== Final ==
Away	Score	Home	Score
Helsingfors SK	5	HJK Helsinki	0

Helsingfors Skridskoklubb wins the 1932–33 SM-sarja championship.

Preceded by 1931–32 SM-sarja season	SM-sarja season 1932–33	Succeeded by 1933–34 SM-sarja season
