= 1927–28 SM-sarja season =

Finnish ice hockey season

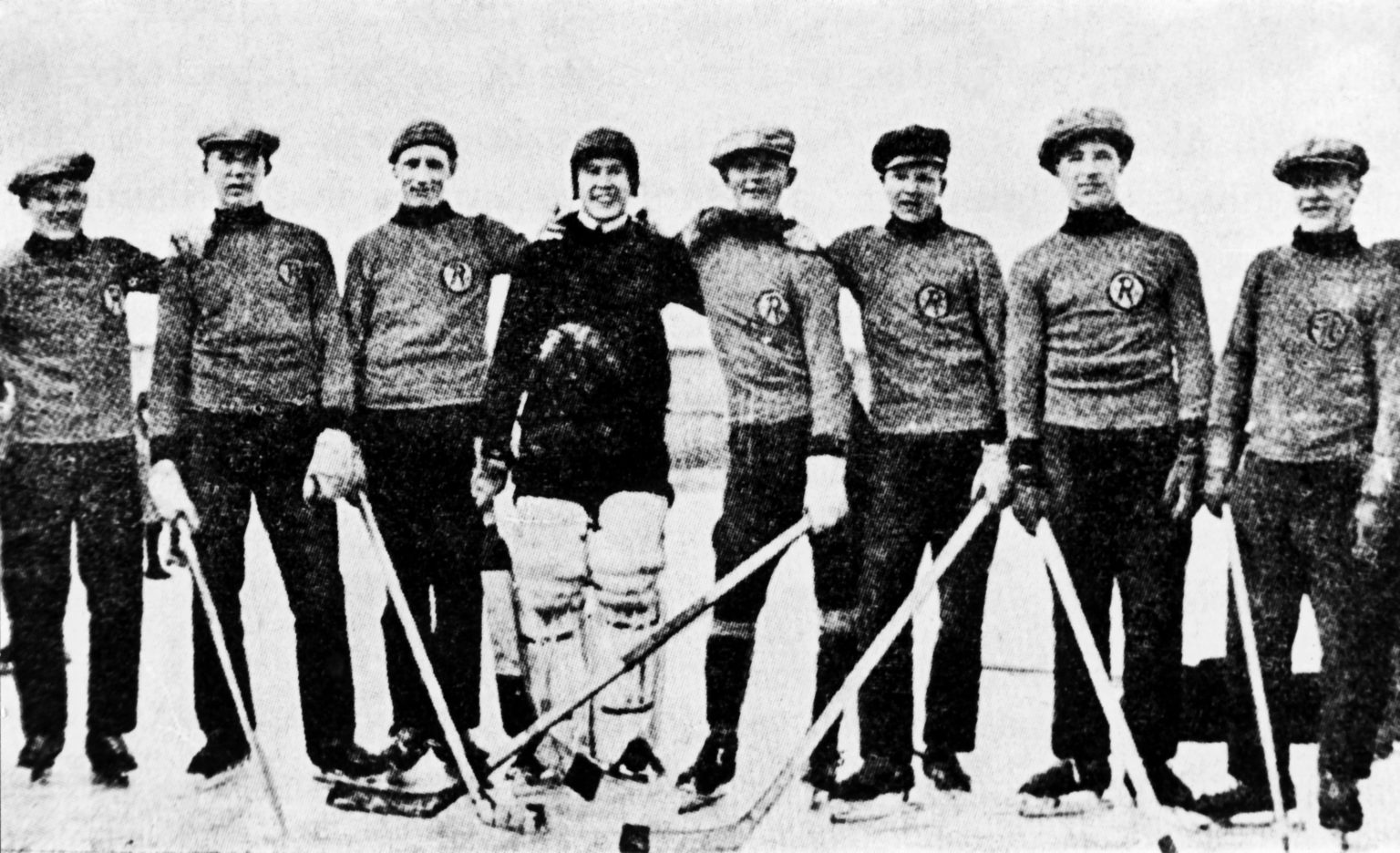
Viipurin Reipas became the first champions of ice hockey in Finland.

The 1927–28 SM-sarja was the first-ever Finnish Ice Hockey Championship. The tournament featured six teams from three cities and was set up by the Finnish Ball Association, before the establishment of the Finnish Ice Hockey Association in 1929.

== First round ==
Away	Score	Home	Score
HPS Helsinki	0	TaPa Tampere	1

Away	Score	Home	Score
Reipas Viipuri	4	HJK Helsinki	3

== Second round ==
Away	Score	Home	Score	Notes
TaPa Tampere	1	Reipas Viipuri	2	OT

Away	Score	Home	Score
KIF Helsinki	3	HIFK Helsinki	1

== Final ==
Away	Score	Home	Score
Reipas Viipuri	5	KIF Helsinki	1

Viipurin Reipas wins the first-ever Finnish Ice Hockey Championship.

Preceded by -	First SM-sarja season 1927–28	Succeeded by 1928–29 SM-sarja season
