= Katja Lavonius =

Finnish ice hockey player and executive

- Born: 6 April 1965 (age 61) Helsinki, Finland
- Height: 171 cm (5 ft 7 in)
- Weight: 69 kg (152 lb; 10 st 12 lb)
- Position: Forward
- Shot: Left
- Played for: HJK Helsinki; EVU Vantaa; Shakers Kerava; Kiekko-Espoo; Espoo Blues
- National team: Finland
- Playing career: c. 1982–2002
Medal record
World Championship
Bronze medal – third place	1994 United States
Bronze medal – third place	1990 Canada
European Championship
Gold medal – first place	1993 Denmark
Gold medal – first place	1991 Czechoslovakia

Katja Lavonius (born 6 April 1965) is a Finnish retired ice hockey player and former general manager of the Espoo Blues Naiset. As a member of the Finnish national ice hockey team, she won bronze medals at the IIHF Women's World Championships in 1990 and 1994, and gold medals at the IIHF European Women Championships in 1991 and 1993.

== Playing career ==
One of the pioneers of women's ice hockey in Finland, Lavonius won the inaugural Naisten SM-sarja championship with Helsingin Jääkiekkoklubi (HJK) in 1983. After sitting out the 1983–84 season, she played with HJK through the 1985–86 season and then spent two seasons with Etelä-Vantaan Urheilijat (EVU).

In 1988, she joined the Keravan Shakers, with whom she remained for nine seasons and won the Finnish Championship in 1994, 1995, and 1996.

Lavonius moved to Kiekko-Espoo Naiset for the 1997–98 season and continued with the team while it was renamed as the Espoo Blues Naiset in 1998. With the Espoo Blues, she won three more Finnish Championship titles, in 1999, 2001, and 2002.

== Career statistics ==
=== International ===
Year	Team	Event	Result	GP	G	A	Pts	PIM
1990	Finland	WW	3rd place, bronze medalist(s)	5	1	0	1	2
1991	Finland	EC	1st place, gold medalist(s)	5	4	1	5	0
1993	Finland	EC	1st place, gold medalist(s)	3	0	2	2	0
1994	Finland	WW	3rd place, bronze medalist(s)	5	4	0	4	0
Totals				18	9	3	12	2
