= U20 SM-sarja =

Junior ice hockey league in Finland

- Formerly: Nuorten SM-liiga
- Sport: Ice hockey
- Founded: 1945
- Founder: Finnish Ice Hockey Association
- No. of teams: 18
- Country: Finland
- Most recent champion: Lukko U20 (2024–25)
- Most titles: Tampereen Ilves U20 (22)
- Broadcaster: Ruutu
- Level on pyramid: 1
- Relegation to: U20 Mestis
- Related competitions: Liiga
- Website: U20 SM-sarja

The U20 SM-sarja ('Under-20 Finnish Championship Series') is the premier junior men's ice hockey league in Finland. It was previously known as the A-nuorten SM-sarja ('Junior A Finnish Championship Series') during 1945 to 1991 and the Nuorten SM-liiga ('Junior Finnish Championship League') during 1991 to 2020. The league was founded by the Finnish Ice Hockey Association in 1945 and a Finnish Champion in men's under-20 ice hockey has been named annually since the league's inaugural season – with the exception of the 2019–20 season, in which the playoffs were cancelled due to the COVID-19 pandemic. Eighteen to twenty teams compete in the U20 SM-sarja regular season, which is played in a preliminary ranking stage followed by a divisional or group stage.

== Teams ==
Each team in the U20 SM-sarja is the junior development squad of a professional ice hockey club and shares the club's name. Most of the senior clubs of U20 teams play in the Liiga, the premier men's ice hockey league in Finland. Notable exceptions include Jokerit, Kiekko-Espoo, Rovaniemen Kiekko (RoKi), and TUTO Hockey, all of which play in the second-tier Mestis.

In conversation, the league and participating teams are referred to as U20, A-nuorten/A-nuoret, or U20-nuorten/U20-nuoret interchangeably – the terms originate in various naming structures used by the Finnish Ice Hockey Association over the history of the league.

=== 2020–21 season ===
Note: Oy is an abbreviation of osakeyhtiö, a type of limited company in Finland; Ab is the abbreviation of aktiebolag, the Swedish term for an osakeyhtiö. The abbreviations ry and rf refer respectively to the Finnish and Swedish terms for a registered non-profit organization in Finland (Finnish: rekisteröity yhdistys; Swedish: registrerad förening).

Team name	Club's registered name	Location
**HPK U20**	HPK Liiga Oy	Hämeenlinna
**Ilves U20**	Ilves Hockey Oy	Tampere
**Jokerit U20**	Jokerit Hockey Club Oy	Helsinki
**Jukurit U20**	Jukurit HC Oy	Mikkeli
**JYP U20**	JYP Jyväskylä Oy	Jyväskylä
**KalPa U20**	KalPa Hockey Oy	Kuopio
**Kiekko-Espoo U20**	Kiekko-Espoo ry	Espoo
**HIFK U20** or **Kollit**	HIFK Ishockey rf	Helsinki
**KooKoo U20**	KooKoo Hockey Oy	Kouvola
**Kärpät U20**	Oulun Kärpät Oy	Oulu
**Lukko U20**	Rauman Lukko Oy	Rauma
**Pelicans U20**	Lahden Pelicans Oy	Lahti
**RoKi U20**	Rovaniemen Kiekko ry	Rovaniemi
**SaiPa U20**	Liiga-Saipa Oy	Lappeenranta
**Sport U20**	Hockey-Team Vaasan Sport Oy	Vaasa
**Tappara U20**	Tamhockey Oy	Tampere
**TPS U20**	HC TPS Turku Oy	Turku
**TUTO Hockey U20**	TuTo Hockey Oy	Turku
**Ässät U20**	HC Ässät Pori Oy	Pori

Renamed, still in U20 SM-sarja

- JyP HT and JyP, now JYP
- Espoo Blues, now Kiekko-Espoo
- Kiekkoreipas, Hockey-Reipas, and Reipas Lahti, now Pelicans

=== Former clubs ===
At present, this list includes only those former clubs which won a Finnish Championship medal while playing in the U20 SM-sarja.

Bold indicates U20 ice hockey team currently active and playing in the U20 Mestis.

- Hämeenlinnan Tarmo, Hämeenlinna
- Helsingin Jääkiekkoklubi (HJK), Helsinki
- **Hermes**, Kokkola
- **Karhu-Kissat (K-Kissat)**, Helsinki
- **KOOVEE**, Tampere
  - previously called Tampereen Kilpa-Veljet (TK-V)
- Kotkan Työväen Palloilijat (KTP), Kotka
- Kuopion Palloseura (KuPS), Kuopio
- Lauritsalan Kisa (LaKi), Lauritsala
- Mikkelin Palloilijat, Mikkeli
- Porin Pallo-Toverit (PPT), Pori
- Porin Karhut, Pori
- Rauman Hokki, Rauma
- Reipas Lahti, Lahti
- **Savonlinnan Pallokerho (SaPKo)**, Savonlinna
- Tammerfors Bollklubb (TBK), Tampere
- Tampereen Kisa-Toverit (TKT), Tampere
- Tampereen Pallo-Veikot (TPV), Tampere
- Töölön Vesa, Helsinki
- Åbo IFK, Turku (Åbo)

== Champions by year ==
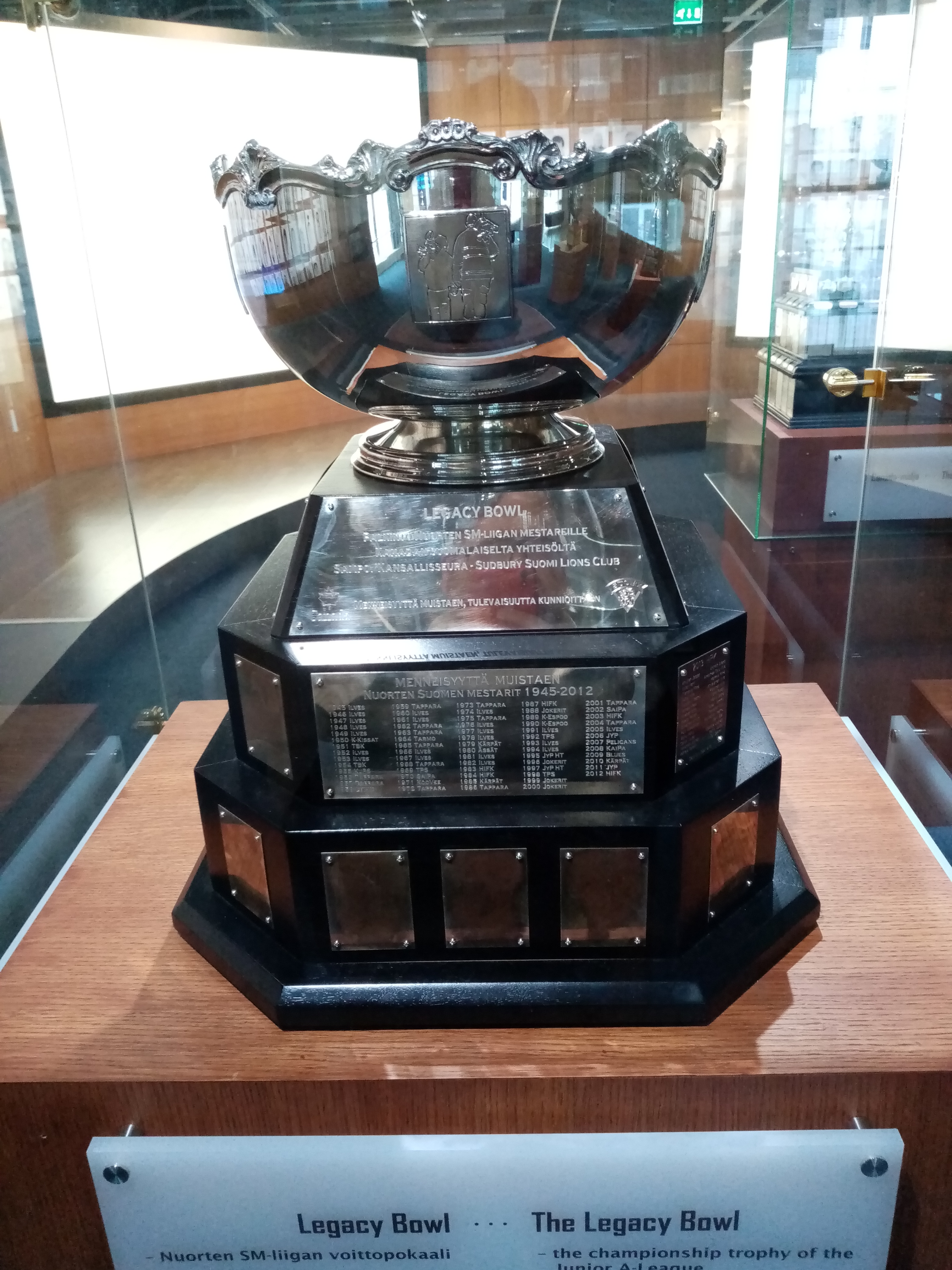
The Legacy Bowl is the men's under-20 Finnish Championship trophy. It was donated by members of the Finnish-Canadian community in 2013.

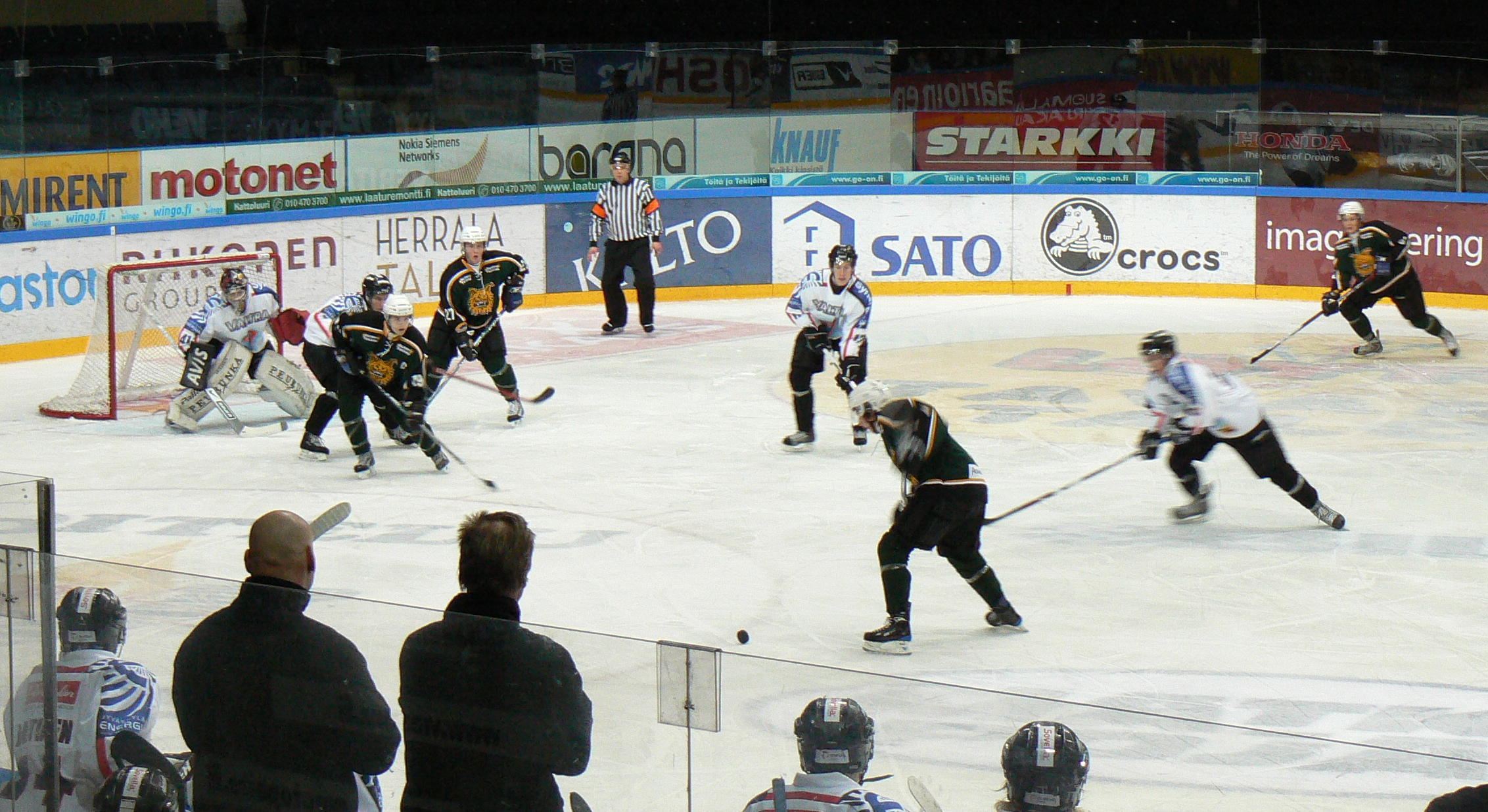
Ilves vs JYP Junior A match in 2008

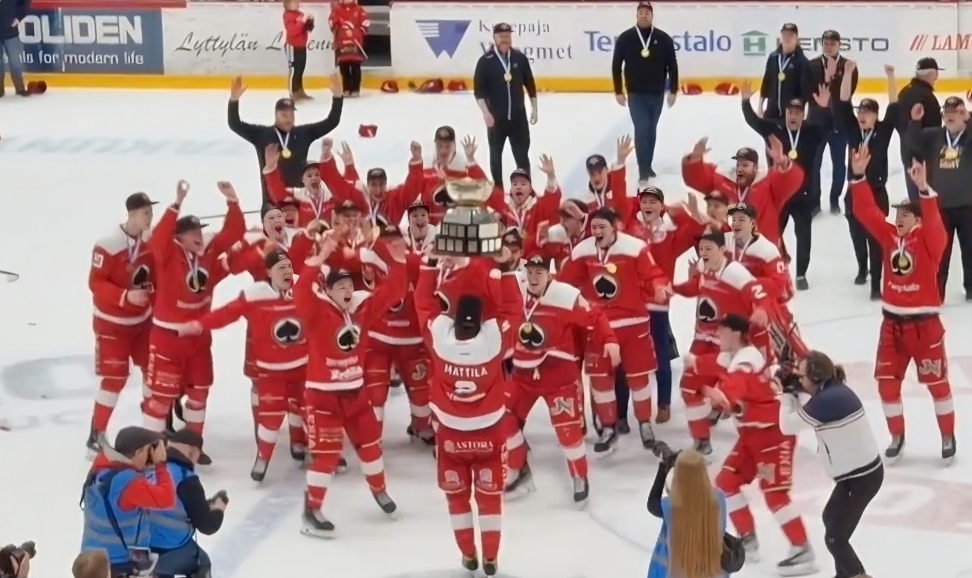
Porin Ässät U20 celebrating in 2024

Year	(gold) Champions	(silver) Runners-up	(bronze) Third Place
1945	Ilves	K-Kissat	–
1946	Ilves	ÅIFK	–
1947	Ilves	HJK	–
1948	Ilves	Tarmo	HJK
1949	Ilves	TBK	HJK
1950	K-Kissat	ÅIFK	Ilves
1951	TBK	K-Kissat	–
1952	Ilves	TBK	–
1953	Ilves	Lukko	HJK
1954	TBK	K-Kissat	Ilves
1955	KuPS	Ilves	TBK
1956	Tappara	TKT	KTP
1957	Tappara	Hermes	PPT
1958	Lukko	Tappara	Tarmo
1959	Tappara	TK-V	KalPa
1960	Ilves	TK-V	Tarmo
1961	Ilves	Tappara	Mikkelin Palloilijat
1962	Tappara	Ilves	LaKi
1963	Tappara	Ilves	LaKi
1964	Tarmo	TuTo	SaiPa
1965	Tappara	SaiPa	HPK / TPV
1966	Ilves	SaiPa	Rauman Hokki / Töölön Vesa
1967	Ilves	SaPKo	HIFK / Karhut
1968	Tappara	TPS	SaiPa
1969	TPS	Tappara	Reipas
1970	SaiPa	Ilves	Tappara
1971	KOOVEE	Ässät	Tappara
1972	Tappara	Jokerit	Ilves
1973	Tappara	Ilves	Ässät
1974	Ilves	Reipas	SaiPa
1975	Tappara	KOOVEE	Ilves
1976	Ilves	KOOVEE	Ässät
1977	Ilves	TPS	Kärpät
1978	Ilves	Kärpät	TPS
1979	Kärpät	Tappara	TPS
1980	Ässät	Jokerit	TPS
1981	Ilves	Tappara	Kärpät
1982	Ilves	HIFK	Tappara
1983	HIFK	Ilves	TPS
1984	HIFK	Ilves	TPS
1985	Kärpät	HIFK	TPS
1986	Tappara	Ilves	HIFK
1987	HIFK	Tappara	Kärpät
1988	Jokerit	Tappara	Kärpät
1989	K-Espoo	Tappara	HIFK
1990	K-Espoo	Tappara	HIFK
1991	Ilves	HIFK	JyP HT
1992	TPS	Ilves	Ässät
1993	Ilves	TPS	Ässät
1994	Ilves	TPS	JyP HT
1995	JyP HT	Ilves	K-Espoo
1996	Jokerit	KalPa	K-Espoo
1997	JyP HT	HPK	Ässät
1998	TPS	Jokerit	Tappara
1999	Jokerit	Ilves	TPS
2000	Jokerit	TPS	Lukko
2001	Tappara	HIFK	JYP
2002	SaiPa	TPS	HIFK
2003	HIFK	Jokerit	Blues
2004	Tappara	JYP	HIFK
2005	Ilves	TPS	JYP
2006	JYP	Kärpät	Blues
2007	Pelicans	Blues	HIFK
2008	KalPa	Ässät	JYP
2009	Blues	TPS	Lukko
2010	Kärpät	HIFK	Ilves
2011	JYP	Blues	Ilves
2012	HIFK	Jokerit	HPK
2013	HPK	Blues	Lukko
2014	Blues	Kärpät	Ässät
2015	TPS	HPK	Blues
2016	Ilves	Blues	KalPa
2017	HPK	Ässät	Lukko
2018	KalPa	Kärpät	HIFK
2019	Kärpät	Blues	Sport
2020	Playoffs cancelled due to COVID-19 pandemic		
2021	Lukko	Kärpät	Tappara / TPS
2022	Lukko	KalPa	TPS
2023	Tappara	Jokerit	TPS
2024	Ässät	TPS	Tappara
2025	Lukko	K-Espoo	KalPa
2026	K-Espoo	Ilves	HPK

== Awards ==
In 2010, the Finnish Ice Hockey Association standardized the award categories across the top leagues in each competition class under its administration: the Mestis, the Naisten Liiga, the U20 SM-sarja, the U18 SM-sarja (B-nuorten SM-sarja), and the U16 SM-sarja (C-nuorten SM-sarja). New trophies were created for award categories not previously used by a league and existing awards were renamed after iconic players in Finnish ice hockey.

- Player of the Year: Teemu Selänne Trophy
- Rookie of the Year: Yrjö Hakala Trophy
- Best Goaltender: Jorma Valtonen Trophy
- Best Defenseman: Reijo Ruotsalainen Trophy
- Best Forward: Saku Koivu Trophy
- Point Scoring Leader: Kari Jalonen Trophy
- Top Goal Scorer: Arto Javanainen Trophy
- Playoffs MVP: Ville Peltonen Trophy
- Fair-Play/Gentlemanly Player: Jere Lehtinen Trophy
- Best Plus–minus: Raimo Helminen Trophy
- Coach of the Year: Hannu Aravirta Trophy
- All-Star First & Second Teams
- Fair-Play Team

== See also ==
- Finland men's national junior ice hockey team
- Ice hockey in Finland
