= 1931–32 SM-sarja season =

Finnish ice hockey season

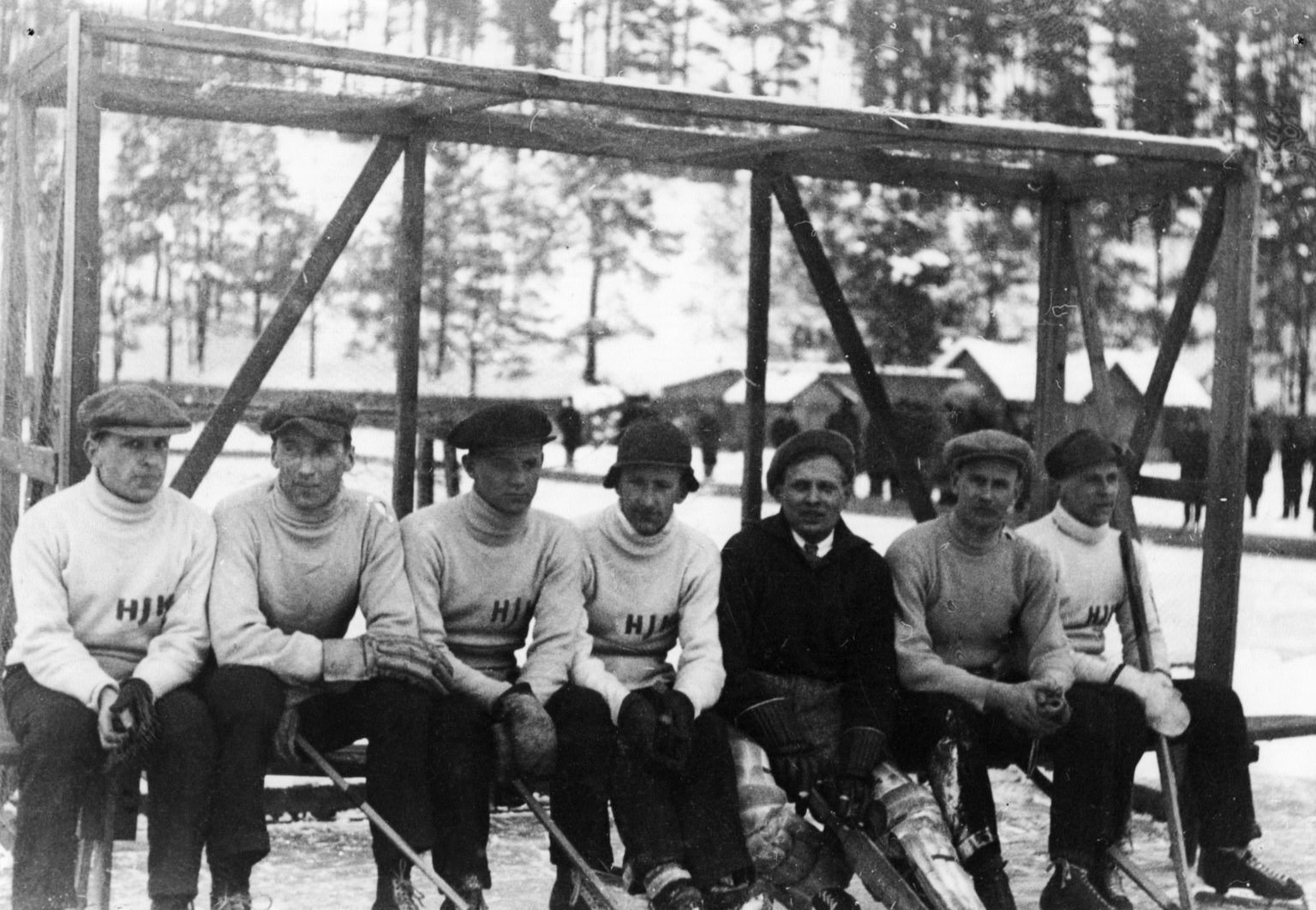
Champions HJK

The 1931–1932 SM-sarja season was again played as a cup. There were 6 Teams from 3 Cities.

== First round ==
Away	Score	Home	Score
Ilves Tampere	1	TaPa Tampere	2

Away	Score	Home	Score
HSK Helsinki	0	HPS Helsinki	4

TaPa and HPS through to Semifinals.

== Semifinals ==
Away	Score	Home	Score
HPS Helsinki	6	TaPa Tampere	1

Away	Score	Home	Score	Notes
Reipas Viipuri	0	HJK Helsinki	1	by forfeit

HPS and HJK through to Final.

== Final ==
Away	Score	Home	Score
HPS Helsinki	0	HJK Helsinki	4

Helsingin Jalkapalloklubi wins the 1931–1932 Finnish ice hockey championship.

Preceded by 1930–31 SM-sarja season	SM-sarja season 1931–32	Succeeded by 1932–33 SM-sarja season
