= Tampereen Palloilijat =

Finnish football club

- Full name: Tampereen Palloilijat ry
- Short name: TaPa
- Founded: 22 July 1921; 104 years ago
- Chairman: Teemu Paukamainen
- Manager: Matti Kukkonen
- League: Nelonen
- 2025: Nelonen B, 10th of 12
- Website: tampereenpalloilijat.fi
Home colours

Tampereen Palloilijat or TaPa is a Finnish football club based in Tampere. In the 2025 season the club played in Nelonen, the sixth tier of football in Finland. In the past the club has also played ice hockey and the club participated in the first ever Finnish ice hockey championship in 1928 and won the championship in 1931.

== History ==
Tampereen Palloilijat was founded in July of 1921 by eleven youngsters interested in football. In 1924 the members of the club built the first grass pitch of inner Finland in the Kaleva district of Tampere. In the opening match of the pitch Tampereen Palloilijat won HIFK 3–2. In January of 1928 Tampereen Palloilijat made history after playing the first ever official ice hockey match in the history of Finland and in 1931 the club won its first championship in ice hockey after beating HJK. Doing so, the club also became the first one to bring the ice hockey championship to Tampere.

TaPa was promoted to the Mestaruussarja, the top tier of Finnish football in 1960. In the 1961 season of the Mestaruussarja the club made the new attendance record of the Tampere Stadium after attracting 8000 people to the stands of the stadium in a game against local rivals FC Haka. In the 1962 season the club achieved third place in the Mestaruussarja. In 1968 the club merged together with Tampellan Pallo after hitting financial difficulties creating the club Tampellan Palloilijat which played in the Mestaruussarja for one season in 1971. Soon after in 1974 Tampellan Palloilijat and Ilves-Kissat merged together into Ilves which made a comeback to the Finnish football scene after having no football department for almost three decades. After the merger into Ilves Tampereen Palloilijat re-established its junior department in 1980 but after the merger TaPa have no longer played in the upper tiers of Finnish football.

=== Season to season ===
Season to season of TaPa

Season	Level	Division	Section	Administration	Position	Movements
1930	Tier 2	B-Sarja (Second Division)	Cup format	Finnish FA (Suomen Palloliitto)	Semi-finals	
1931-34		Häme District competitions				
1935	Tier 2	B-Sarja (Second Division)	West Group	Finnish FA (Suomen Palloliitto)	4th	
1936	Tier 2	Itä-Länsi-sarja (Second Division)	West League	Finnish FA (Suomen Palloliitto)	5th	
1937	Tier 2	Itä-Länsi-sarja (Second Division)	West League	Finnish FA (Suomen Palloliitto)	5th	
1938	Tier 2	Itä-Länsi-sarja (Second Division)	West League, North Group	Finnish FA (Suomen Palloliitto)	4th	
1939	Tier 2	Itä-Länsi-sarja (Second Division)	West League, Group 3	Finnish FA (Suomen Palloliitto)	1st	Promotion Group West 4th
1940-41	Tier 2	B-Sarja (Second Division)		Finnish FA (Suomen Palloliitto)	6th	
1945-46	Tier 3	Maakuntasarja (Third Division)	Satakunta	Finnish FA (Suomen Pallolitto)	1st	Promotion Playoff
1946-47	Tier 3	Maakuntasarja (Third Division)	Tampere	Finnish FA (Suomen Pallolitto)	2nd	
1947-48	Tier 3	Maakuntasarja (Third Division)	Satakunta	Finnish FA (Suomen Pallolitto)	3rd	
1948	Tier 3	Maakuntasarja (Third Division)	West Group A	Finnish FA (Suomen Pallolitto)	1st	Promotion Playoff
1949	Tier 3	Maakuntasarja (Third Division)	West Group B	Finnish FA (Suomen Pallolitto)	6th	Relegated
1950	Tier 4	Piirisarja (District League)	West	Tampere District (SPL Tampere)		Promotion Playoff
1951	Tier 4	Piirisarja (District League)	West	Tampere District (SPL Tampere)		Promotion Playoff
1952	Tier 4	Piirisarja (District League)		Tampere District (SPL Tampere)		Promotion Playoff
1953-54		Piirisarja (District League)		Tampere District (SPL Tampere)		
1955	Tier 4	Piirisarja (District League)		Tampere District (SPL Tampere)		Promotion Playoff - Promoted
1956	Tier 3	Maakuntasarja (Third Division)	West Group I	Finnish FA (Suomen Pallolitto)	6th	
1957	Tier 3	Maakuntasarja (Third Division)	West Group II	Finnish FA (Suomen Pallolitto)	3rd	
1958	Tier 3	Maakuntasarja (Third Division)	Group 5	Finnish FA (Suomen Pallolitto)	2nd	
1959	Tier 3	Maakuntasarja (Third Division)	Group 6	Finnish FA (Suomen Pallolitto)	1st	Promoted
1960	Tier 2	Suomensarja (Second Division)	North Group	Finnish FA (Suomen Palloliitto)	1st	Promoted
1961	Tier 1	Mestaruussarja (Premier League)		Finnish FA (Suomen Palloliitto)	8th	
1962	Tier 1	Mestaruussarja (Premier League)		Finnish FA (Suomen Palloliitto)	3rd	
1963	Tier 1	Mestaruussarja (Premier League)		Finnish FA (Suomen Palloliitto)	11th	Relegated
1964	Tier 2	Suomensarja (Second Division)	West Group	Finnish FA (Suomen Palloliitto)	1st	Promoted
1965	Tier 1	Mestaruussarja (Premier League)		Finnish FA (Suomen Palloliitto)	12th	Relegated
1966	Tier 2	Suomensarja (Second Division)	West Group	Finnish FA (Suomen Palloliitto)	6th	
1967	Tier 2	Suomensarja (Second Division)	West Group	Finnish FA (Suomen Palloliitto)	6th	
1968	Tier 2	Suomensarja (Second Division)	West Group	Finnish FA (Suomen Palloliitto)	5th	
1969	Tier 2	Suomensarja (Second Division)	West Group	Finnish FA (Suomen Palloliitto)	8th	Tampellan Palloilijat
1970	Tier 2	II Divisioona (Second Division)	West Group	Finnish FA (Suomen Palloliitto)	4th	Tampellan Palloilijat
1971	Tier 2	II Divisioona (Second Division)	West Group	Finnish FA (Suomen Palloliitto)	1st	Promotion Group 2nd - Promoted,Tampellan Palloilijat
1972	Tier 1	Mestaruussarja (Premier League)		Finnish FA (Suomen Palloliitto)	8th	Tampellan Palloilijat
1973	Tier 1	Mestaruussarja (Premier League)		Finnish FA (Suomen Palloliitto)	12th	Relegated Tampellan Palloilijat
1974	Tier 2	I Divisioona (First Division)		Finnish FA (Suomen Palloliitto)	8th	Relegated, merged with Ilves-Kissat to join Ilves
1975-97	No team					
1998	Tier 6	Vitonen (Fifth Division)		Tampere District (SPL Tampere)	6th	
1999	Tier 6	Vitonen (Fifth Division)		Tampere District (SPL Tampere)		
2000	Tier 6	Vitonen (Fifth Division)	South	Tampere District (SPL Tampere)		
2001	Tier 6	Vitonen (Fifth Division)	North	Tampere District (SPL Tampere)	2nd	
2002	Tier 6	Vitonen (Fifth Division)	South	Tampere District (SPL Tampere)	2nd	
2003	Tier 6	Vitonen (Fifth Division)	North	Tampere District (SPL Tampere)	2nd	Promoted
2004	Tier 5	Nelonen (Fourth Division)	North	Tampere District (SPL Tampere)	9th	
2005	Tier 5	Nelonen (Fourth Division)	North	Tampere District (SPL Tampere)	11th	
2006	Tier 5	Nelonen (Fourth Division)	North	Tampere District (SPL Tampere)	9th	Relegated
2007	Tier 6	Vitonen (Fifth Division)	Group 1	Tampere District (SPL Tampere)	11th	Relegation Playoff
2008	Tier 6	Vitonen (Fifth Division)	Group 3	Tampere District (SPL Tampere)	6th	
2009	Tier 6	Vitonen (Fifth Division)	Group 2	Tampere District (SPL Tampere)	5th	
2010	Tier 6	Vitonen (Fifth Division)	Group 2	Tampere District (SPL Tampere)	7th	
2011	Tier 6	Vitonen (Fifth Division)	Group 1	Tampere District (SPL Tampere)	9th	
2012	Tier 6	Vitonen (Fifth Division)	Group 2	Tampere District (SPL Tampere)	4th	
2013	Tier 6	Vitonen (Fifth Division)	Group 1	Tampere District (SPL Tampere)	11th	Relegated
2014	Tier 7	Kutonen (Sixth Division)	Group 3	Tampere District (SPL Tampere)	2nd	Promotion Playoff - Promoted
2015	Tier 6	Vitonen (Fifth Division)	Group 1	Tampere District (SPL Tampere)	2nd	
2016	Tier 6	Vitonen (Fifth Division)	Group 2	Tampere District (SPL Tampere)	3rd	
2017	Tier 6	Vitonen (Fifth Division)		Tampere District (SPL Tampere)	3rd	
2018	Tier 6	Vitonen (Fifth Division)		Tampere District (SPL Tampere)	6th	
2019	Tier 6	Vitonen (Fifth Division)		Tampere District (SPL Tampere)	2nd	Promoted
2020	Tier 5	Nelonen (Fourth Division)	Group B	Western District (Suomen Palloliitto)	9th	
2021	Tier 5	Nelonen (Fourth Division)	Group B	Western District (Suomen Palloliitto)	10th	
2022	Tier 5	Nelonen (Fourth Division)	Group B	Western District (Suomen Palloliitto)	5th	
2023	Tier 5	Nelonen (Fourth Division)	Group B	Western District (Suomen Palloliitto)	8th	
2024	Tier 6	Nelonen (Fourth Division)	Group B	Western District (Suomen Palloliitto)	8th	
2025	Tier 6	Nelonen (Fourth Division)	Group B	Western District (Suomen Palloliitto)		

- 6 seasons in Mestaruussarja
- 16 seasons in Ykkönen
- 9 seasons in Maakuntasarja
- 4 seasons in Piirisarja
- 8 seasons in Nelonen
- 20 seasons in Vitonen
- 1 season in Kutonen

== Ice Hockey ==
TaPa played in the first SM-sarja season. TaPa played a total of 4 seasons in the SM-sarja (1928, 1929, 1931 and 1932).

The best result for TaPa was the winning of SM-sarja in 1931

=== Notable players ===
- Niilo Tammisalo
- Risto Tiitola
