= 1982–83 Naisten SM-sarja season =

1st ice hockey season of the Naisten SM-sarja

- League: Naisten SM-sarja
- Sport: Ice hockey
- Games: 8
- Teams: 10

Regular Season
- Season champions: Ilves Tampere (Lohko A); EVU Vantaa (Lohko B)
- Top scorer: Anne Bäckman (Ässät)

Playoffs
- Finals champions: HJK Helsinki (1)
- Runners-up: Ilves Tampere

Seasons
- 1983–84

The 1982–83 Naisten SM-sarja season was the first season of the Naisten SM-sarja, the premier league of women's ice hockey in Finland. The inaugural Finnish Champions in women's ice hockey were HJK Helsinki, winners of the 1983 Naisten SM-sarja final tournament. Finnish Championship silver was won by Ilves Tampere and bronze by EVU Vantaa.

== Season format ==
The ten teams were divided into two groups of five, called Lohko A (lit. 'Group A') and Lohko B (lit. 'Group B'). The groups were closed in the regular season and played as double round-robins. Every team played against the other four teams in their group twice for a total of eight games. Two points were awarded for a win and one point for a tie. The top two teams from the groups qualified for the final tournament.

== Teams ==
Location of Naisten SM-sarja teams in Finland. Lohko A, Lohko B
Location of Naisten SM-sarja teams in the Uusimaa region. Lohko A, Lohko B

Lohko A comprised the four teams located outside of the Uusimaa region – Ilves in Tampere, SaiPa in Lappeenranta, Tiikerit in Hämeenlinna, and Ässät in Pori – and the northern-most team in Uusimaa, Haukat in Järvenpää, The five teams of Lohko B were situated across four municipalities of the Greater Helsinki metropolitan area: Jäähonka in Espoo, Shakers in Kerava, Etelä-Vantaan Urheilijat (EVU) in Vantaa, and both HIFK and Helsingin Jääkiekkoklubi (HJK) in Helsinki.

Team	Location
Lohko A
Haukat	Järvenpää
Ilves	Tampere
SaiPa	Lappeenranta
Tiikerit	Hämeenlinna
Ässät	Pori
Lohko B
EVU	Vantaa
HIFK	Helsinki
HJK	Helsinki
Jäähonka	Espoo
Shakers	Kerava

== Regular season ==
=== Lohko A ===
Ilves swept all eight games to claim first place in Lohko A with 16 points. In an unexpected twist, Tiikerit and Ässät were tied in second place at the end of the regular season with ten points, identical win-loss records, and a goal difference of exactly +22 each. As only two teams were able to progress to the final tournament, Tiikerit and Ässät played a sudden death match to qualify for the final tournament, which Tikkerit won 7–6.

Both SaiPa and Haukat found no success against the top three teams in Lohko A, splitting their two-game regular season series to win one game each.

Rank	Team	GP	W	T	L	GF:GA	GD	Pts
1.	Ilves Tampere	8	8	0	0	128:9	119	16
2.	Tiikerit Hämeenlinna	8	5	0	3	58:36	22	10
2.	Ässät Pori	8	5	0	3	62:40	22	10
4.	SaiPa Lappeenranta	8	1	0	7	13:87	-74	2
5.	Haukat Järvenpää	8	1	0	7	12:112	-100	2

==== Game record ====
The largest goal difference recorded in a single game during the 1982–83 season was amassed by Ilves in their match against Haukat in Tampere, in which Ilves scored 28 goals in a shutout. Ilves also recorded the second largest single-game goal difference in their match against SaiPa in Lappeenranta, scoring 23 goals in a shutout.

AWAY→	Ilves	Tiikerit	Ässät	SaiPa	Haukat
HOME↓	Ilves	Tiikerit	Ässät	SaiPa	Haukat
Ilves		12–3	14–2	15–0	28–0
Tiikerit	2–11		5–8	6–2	10–1
Ässät	1–7	1–7		11–2	23–1
SaiPa	0–23	0–11	0–14		6–3
Haukat	1–18	1–14	4–16	4–3	

==== Player statistics ====
Anne Bäckman of Ässät was the top regular season scorer of Lohko A and the league overall, tallying an astounding 42 points in 7 games at a blistering clip of 6 points per game. Her league-leading 33 goals accounted for over half of the 62 goals scored for Ässät and were 25 goals ahead of the next highest Ässät goal-scorer. With the addition of her 9 assists, she was involved in two-thirds of all goals scored for Ässät.

Jaana Rautavuoma of Ilves finished the season ranked second in Lohko A and the league overall with 29 goals and league-leading 13 assists for 42 points in 8 games. As would be expected for the team that swept the season, Ilves dominated the scoring table with six players ranked in the top ten. Ässät and Tiikerit were represented in the top ten by two players each.

Player	Team	GP	G	A	Pts	PIM
Anne Bäckman	Ässät	7	33	9	42	6
Jaana Rautavuoma	Ilves	8	29	13	42	0
Satu Huotari	Tiikerit	8	27	10	37	8
Anitta Joenniemi	Ilves	8	20	9	29	0
Minna Myllymäki	Ilves	8	11	11	22	8
Jaana Peltonen	Ilves	7	15	3	18	18
Marianne Ihalainen	Ilves	8	11	7	18	0
Sari Keisa	Tiikerit	8	12	5	17	6
Susanne Loikas	Ässät	8	8	8	16	4
Päivi Virta	Ilves	8	5	11	16	6

=== Lohko B ===
EVU were the top team of Lohko B, winning seven of eight games to finish the regular season with 14 points. HJK placed second with 11 points from five wins and one tied game.

In general, the teams of Lohko B exhibited greater parity than those of Lohko A; no team in Lohko B achieved a sweep and the goal difference for the top four teams spanned just 28 goals, compared to a 97 goal span across the top three teams of Lohko A. The exception were the Shakers, who did not win a single game in the season and amassed a goal differential of -124, the worst in the league.

Rank	Team	GP	W	T	L	GF:GA	GD	Pts
1.	EVU Vantaa	8	7	0	1	52:7	45	14
2.	HJK Helsinki	8	5	1	2	49:14	35	11
3.	Jäähonka Espoo	8	4	1	3	41:14	27	9
4.	HIFK	8	3	0	5	43:26	17	6
5.	Keravan Shakers	8	0	0	8	2:126	-124	0

==== Game record ====
The largest goal differential amassed in a single Lohko B game was amassed by HJK in their home game against the Shakers, in which HJK recorded 18 goals in a shutout.

AWAY→	EVU	HJK	Jäähonka	HIFK	Shakers
HOME↓	EVU	HJK	Jäähonka	HIFK	Shakers
EVU		3–0	2–1	9–1	21–0
HJK	4–1		3–2	4–0	18–0
Jäähonka	0–1	3–3		4–2	12–0
HIFK	1–4	5–0	2–4		14–0
Shakers	0–11	0–17	1–15	1–18	

==== Player statistics ====
Jaana Ikonen of Jäähonka was the top point scorer in Lohko B, logging 12 goals and 10 assists for 22 points in 8 games. Sirkka-Liisa Pesonen of HIFK led Lohko B in goals, netting 15 goals in 8 games.

Reflecting the greater parity of the group, four of five teams in Lohko B were represented in the top ten scoring chart. With only two goals recorded on the season – scored by Taina Kiljunen and Raija Kallio – the Shakers were the only team not represented in the scoring top ten.

Player	Team	GP	G	A	Pts	PIM
Jaana Ikonen	Jäähonka	8	12	10	22	4
Katja Lavonius	HJK	7	12	6	18	2
Tarja Kujanpää	Jäähonka	8	12	6	18	6
Sirkka-Liisa Pesonen	HIFK	8	15	2	17	12
Liisa Karikoski	EVU	8	13	3	16	4
Piia Vuorinen	HJK	8	11	4	15	4
Kati Luomajoki	HJK	8	7	7	14	10
Maria Böckelman	HIFK	8	11	2	13	6
Auli Harinen	HJK	5	6	5	11	2
Carola Krook	EVU	8	5	5	10	0

== Final tournament ==
The Finnish Championship final tournament was played during 12 and 13 March 1983 in Tampere.

Rank	Team	GP	W	T	L	GF:GA	GD	Pts
1st place, gold medalist(s)	HJK Helsinki	3	2	1	0	17:4	13	5
2nd place, silver medalist(s)	Ilves Tampere	3	1	2	0	11:5	6	4
3rd place, bronze medalist(s)	EVU Vantaa	3	1	1	1	11:6	5	3
4.	Tiikerit Hämeenlinna	3	0	0	3	6:30	-24	0

=== Game record ===
	Tiikerit	EVU	HJK
Ilves	8–2	1–1	2–2
HJK	12–2	3–0	
EVU	10–2		

=== Player statistics ===
Player	Team	GP	G	A	Pts	PIM
Piia Vuorinen	HJK	3	6	1	7	2
Elisa Koivunen	HJK	3	3	3	6	2
Katja Lavonius	HJK	3	3	2	5	2
Carola Krook	EVU	3	4	0	4	8
Tea Repo	HJK	3	2	2	4	2
Merja Tolvanen	HJK	3	2	2	4	2
Kati Luomajoki	HJK	3	1	3	4	2
Satu Huotari	Tiikerit	3	3	0	3	10
Minna Myllymäki	Ilves	3	2	1	3	6
Mervi Jakonen	EVU	3	2	0	2	0
