= 1930–31 SM-sarja season =

Finnish ice hockey season

The 1930–1931 SM-Sarja Season was played in cup-format with 5 teams from 3 cities participating.

== First round ==
Away	Score	Home	Score
Pyrintö Tampere	1	TaPa Tampere	8

Away	Score	Home	Score
Riento Turku	2	ÅIFK Turku	1

TaPa and Riento through to Semifinals.

== Semifinals ==
Away	Score	Home	Score	Notes
Riento Turku	2	TaPa Tampere	3	OT

Away	Score	Home	Score
HJK Helsinki	1	by forfeit	0

TaPa and HJK to Final.

== Final ==
Away	Score	Home	Score
HJK Helsinki	1	TaPa Tampere	2

Tampereen Palloilijat wins the 1930–31 Finnish ice hockey championship.

Preceded by 1929–30 SM-sarja season (Cancelled) 1928–29 SM-sarja season	SM-sarja season 1930–31	Succeeded by 1931–32 SM-sarja season
