= 1933–34 SM-sarja season =

Finnish ice hockey season

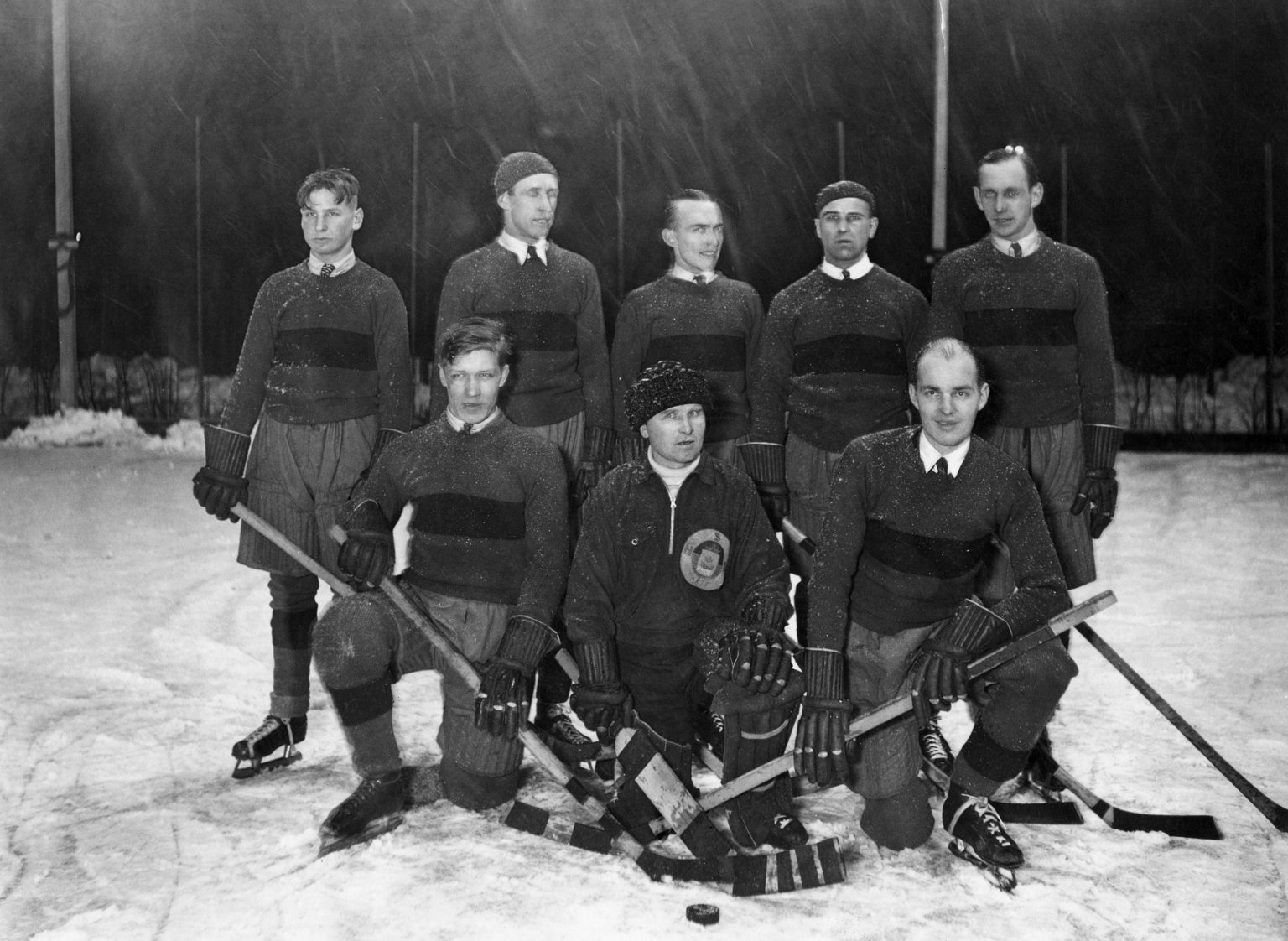
Champions HSK

The 1933–1934 SM-sarja season was the first one to be played as a League rather than a Cup. There was 4 Teams from 2 cities participating.

The 4 teams played 3 games each. The team who wins the regular season wins the championship

== SM-sarja Championship ==
SM-sarja Championship	GP	W	T	L	Pts	GF	GA
HSK Helsinki	3	2	1	0	5	6	2
HPS Helsinki	3	2	0	1	4	6	6
Ilves Tampere	3	1	1	1	3	5	6
HJK Helsinki	3	0	0	3	0	3	6

Helsingfors Skridskoklubb wins the 1933–34 SM-sarja championship.

Preceded by 1932–33 SM-sarja season	SM-sarja season 1933–34	Succeeded by 1934–35 SM-sarja season
