= 1928–29 SM-sarja season =

Finnish Ice Hockey Championship

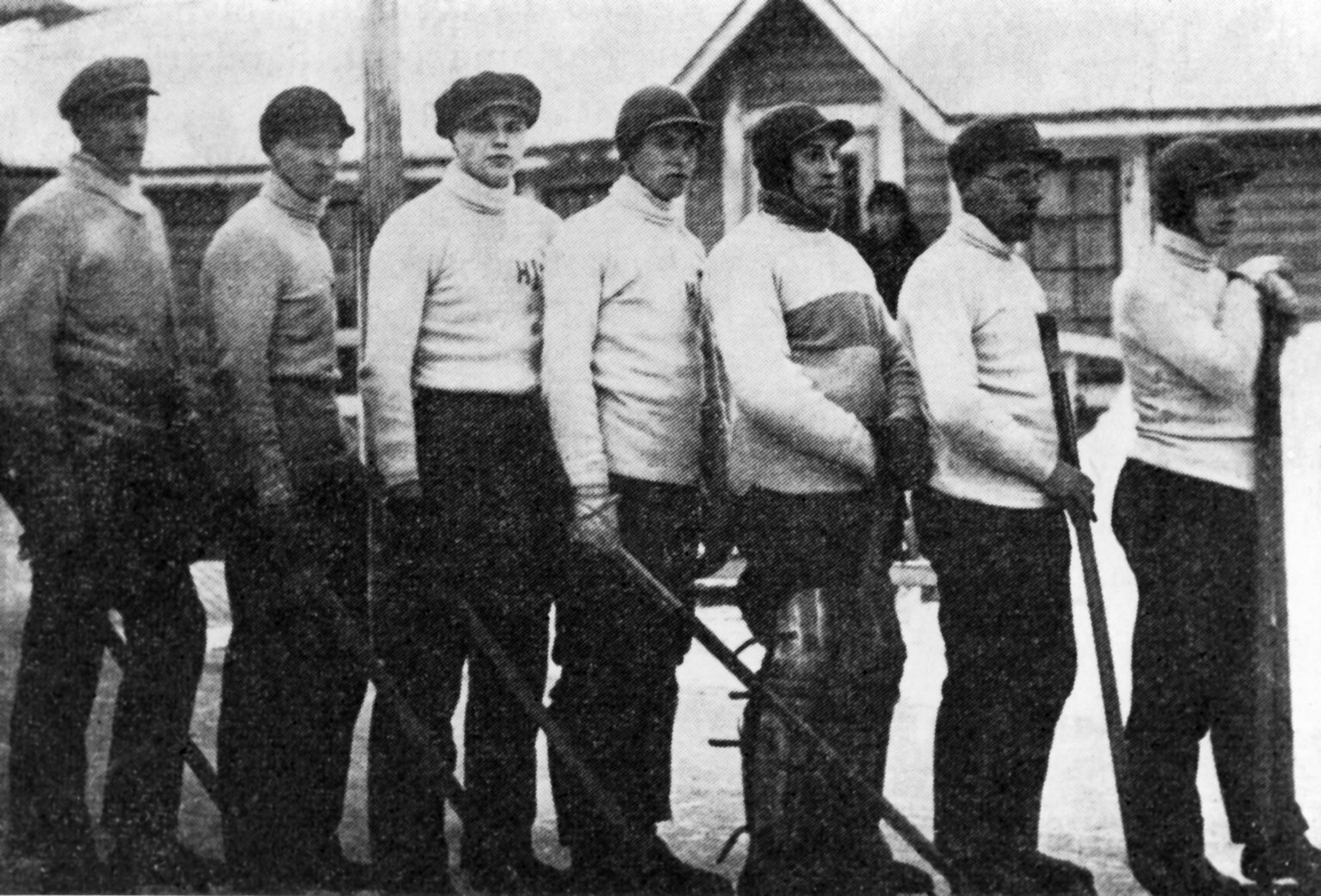
HJK, the 1929 champion of the ice hockey championship series.

The 1928–1929 SM-Sarja season was the second season of the Finnish SM-sarja. Like the season before the 1928–29 season was played as a cup.

== Qualifications ==
Away	Score	Home	Score
HJK Helsinki	6	HIFK Helsinki	3

Away	Score	Home	Score
HPS Helsinki	6	IF Start	1

Away	Score	Home	Score
Pyrintö Tampere	5	TaPa Tampere	4

Away	Score	Home	Score
Pyrintö Tampere	0	ÅIFK Turku	3

Away	Score	Home	Score	Notes
ViPS Viipuri	6	Reipas Viipuri	1	OT

Away	Score	Home	Score	Notes
HJK Helsinki	W	KIF Helsinki	L	by forfeit

== Semi-finals ==
Away	Score	Home	Score	Notes
ViPS Viipuri	3	HPS Helsinki	4	OT

Away	Score	Home	Score
HJK Helsinki	3	ÅIFK Turku	1

HPS and HJK through to the Final.

== Final ==
Away	Score	Home	Score
HJK Helsinki	5	HPS Helsinki	1

Helsingin Jalkapalloklubi wins the 1929 Finnish Ice Hockey Championship.

Preceded by 1927–28 SM-sarja season	SM-sarja season 1928–29	Succeeded by 1929–30 SM-sarja season (cancelled) 1930–31 SM-sarja season
