= 1935–36 SM-sarja season =

Finnish ice hockey season

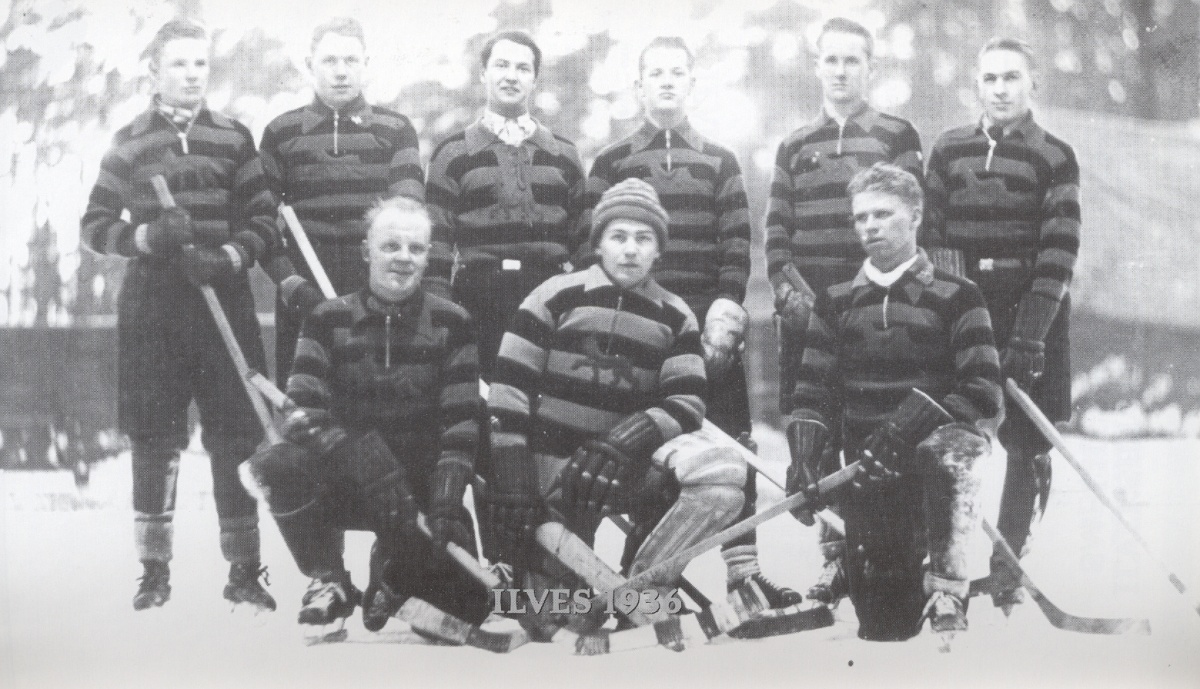
The team that won Ilves' first Finnish championship (1936)

The 1935–1936 SM-sarja season was played between 4 teams from 2 cities. For the first time there was straight relegation facing the team who would finish the lowest. The teams played 6 games each.

== SM-sarja championship ==
SM-sarja	GP	W	T	L	Pts	GF	GA
Ilves Tampere	6	3	3	0	9	20	11
KIF Helsinki	6	4	1	1	9	21	10
HJK Helsinki	6	2	1	3	5	26	24
HSK Helsinki	6	0	1	5	1	10	32

Ilves Wins the 1935–36 SM-sarja championship, Helsingfors Skridskoklubb is relegated to 1. Divisioona.

Preceded by 1934–35 SM-sarja season	SM-sarja season 1935–36	Succeeded by 1936–37 SM-sarja season
