= 1934–35 SM-sarja season =

Finnish ice hockey season

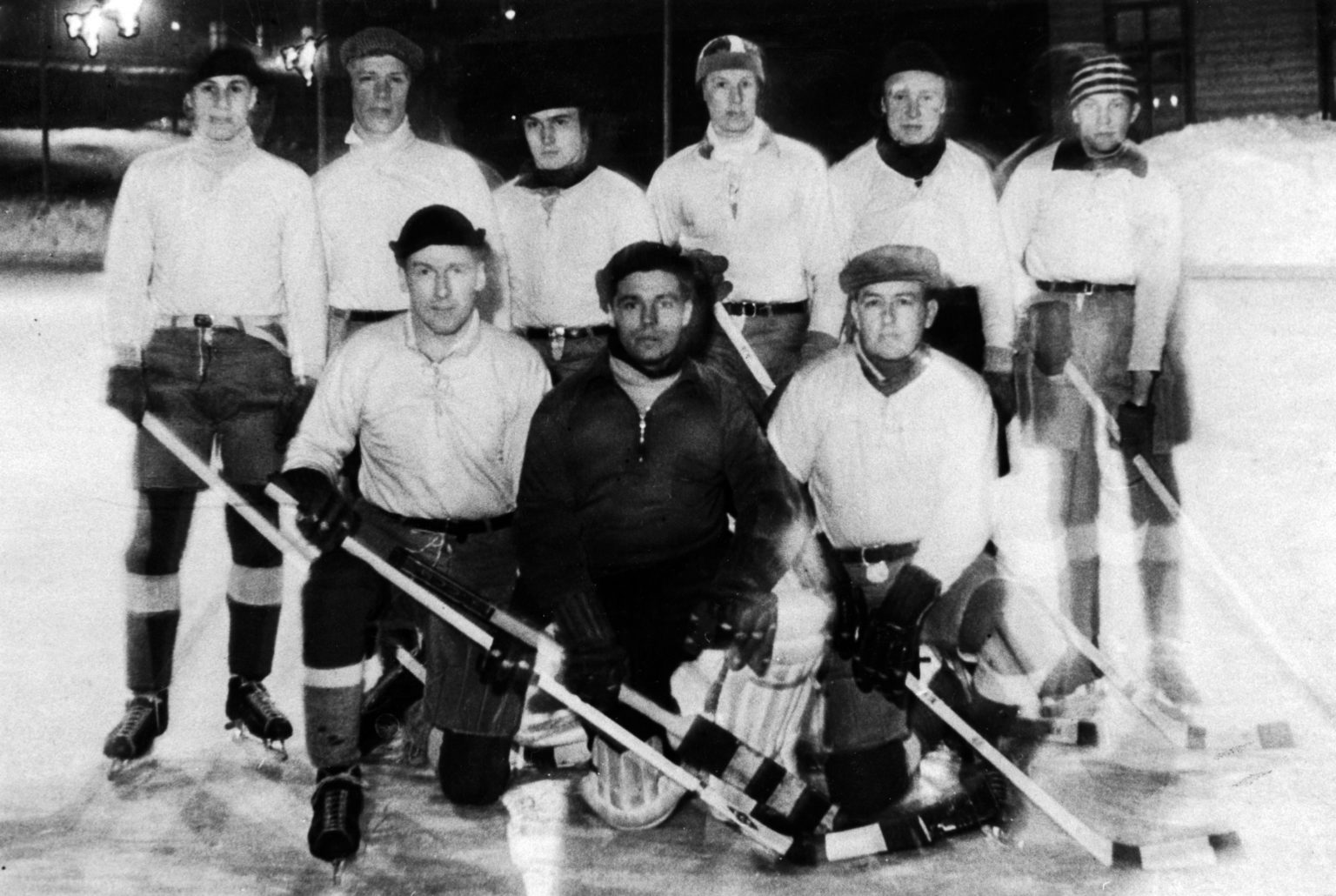
HJK

The 1934–1935 SM-sarja season was played between 3 Teams from 2 cities.

Each team played 4 games each. The winner of the championship was decided during the season.

== SM-sarja championship ==
SM-sarja championship	GP	W	T	L	Pts	GF	GA
HJK Helsinki	4	2	1	1	5	10	7
Ilves Tampere	4	2	0	2	4	8	9
HSK Helsinki	4	1	1	2	3	8	10

Helsingin Jalkapalloklubi wins the 1934–35 SM-sarja championship

Preceded by 1933–34 SM-sarja season	SM-sarja season 1934–35	Succeeded by 1935–36 SM-sarja season
