= 1983–84 Naisten SM-sarja season =

2nd ice hockey season of the Naisten SM-sarja

- League: Naisten SM-sarja
- Sport: Ice hockey
- Games: 8
- Teams: 12

Regular Season
- Season champions: Ilves Tampere (Keskilohko); HJK Helsinki (Etelälohko); Sport Vaasa (Pohjoislohko)
- Top scorer: Sari Krooks (Sport)

Playoffs
- Finals champions: HJK Helsinki (2)
- Runners-up: EVU Vantaa

Seasons
- 1982–83 1984–85

The 1983–84 Naisten SM-sarja season was the second season of the Naisten SM-sarja ice hockey league. The champion was HJK Helsinki. Silver was won by EVU Vantaa and bronze by Ilves Tampere.

== Teams ==
- Ilves Tampere
- Tiikerit Hämeenlinna
- Ässät Pori
- SaiPa Lappeenranta
- Teräs-Kiekko Raahe
- EVU Vantaa
- HJK Helsinki
- Jäähonka Espoo
- HIFK Helsinki
- Shakers Kerava
- Kiekko-Vesa Raahe
- Sport Vaasa
