= Helsingin Jääkiekkoklubi =

Finnish ice hockey club

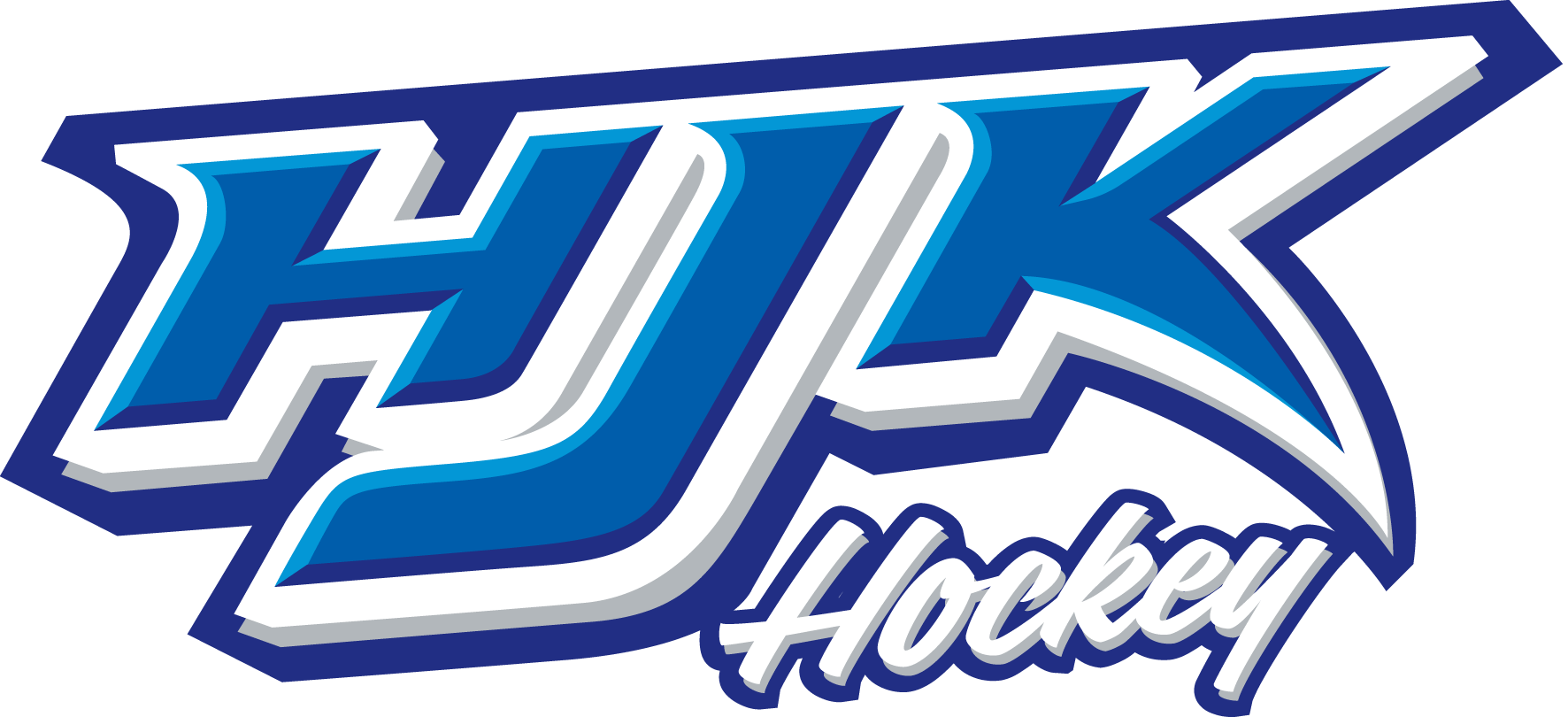
- City: Helsinki
- League: 3. Divisioona
- Founded: 1972; 54 years ago
- Home arena: Kaarelan jäähalli
- Colors: Blue, white
- Affiliates: HIFK Helsinki
- Website: Official website

Championships
- Naisten SM-sarja: 2 (1983, 1984)

Helsingin Jääkiekkoklubi (lit. 'The Ice Hockey Club of Helsinki') or HJK for short is an ice hockey club located in Helsinki, Finland. The team was formed in 1972 when the ice hockey department of Helsingin Jalkapalloklubi was disestablished, but they are considered as different clubs as HJK does not claim any of the previous championships. Nowadays the club mainly focuses on their junior teams. HJK played in the SM-sarja during the 1972–73 season.

HJK has won two women's championships in the 1980s, but the women's department is now not active.

== History ==
The hockey team of the Helsingin Jalkapalloklubi was promoted to the SM-sarja for the 1970–1971 season after being in the Suomensarja for a few years. HJK immediately tried to take part in the championship competition and started recruiting new top players such as Jorma Vehmanen and Matti Keinonen. The competition for players in the metropolitan area was fierce and a considerable amount of money was spent on purchases. Despite the acquisitions, the season did not go according to plan. HJK ranked fifth and the financial losses from hockey were significant for HJK. The championship hurry continued the following season and expenses were increased. This time, HJK finished second, but despite the increased ticket revenue, the club's loss was substantial. At the same time, the state of HJK's football had deteriorated significantly. It was even supposed to fall out of the league and the club's financial resources were no longer enough to strengthen the team. At the end of the 1971–1972 season, HJK had to declare that it was no longer able to run hockey. In the spring, three Helsinki clubs, HJK, Jokerit and Karhu-Kissat, agreed on a merger that was announced in March 1972. However, the merger collapsed three weeks later after the Jokerit withdrew.

Following the failure of the merger, HJK's situation was financially gloomy. Debt had accumulated for almost half a million FIM. In order to save the club, HJK decided to cut down hockey, among other things. Merger negotiations resumed, this time only with the Karhu-Kissat. Finally, in May 1972, the clubs established a joint umbrella organization under which hockey activities were combined. HJK's hockey operations were separated into its own association, the Helsingin Jääkiekkoklubi. In the 1972–1973 season, the joint team finished fifth, but after that, HJK started to play independently. The following season, it dropped out of the league.

== Honours ==
=== Naisten SM-sarja ===
- (gold) (2) 1983, 1984
