= Helsingin Jalkapalloklubi (ice hockey) =

- Nickname: Klubi (The Club)
- City: Helsinki, Finland
- Founded: 1928
- Folded: 1972
- Colors

Championships
- Finnish Champion: 3 (1928–29, 1931–32, 1934–35)

Helsingin Jalkapalloklubi (lit. 'Helsinki's Football Club'), commonly known as HJK Helsinki (Swedish: HJK Helsingfors), or simply as HJK (Finnish: ['hoː jiː koː]), was an ice hockey club in Helsinki, Finland. It operated from 1928 to 1972 until Helsingin Jääkiekkoklubi took over the ice hockey department of the club. HJK won three Finnish Championships and came second six times during its history and won one Finnish Cup.

== History ==
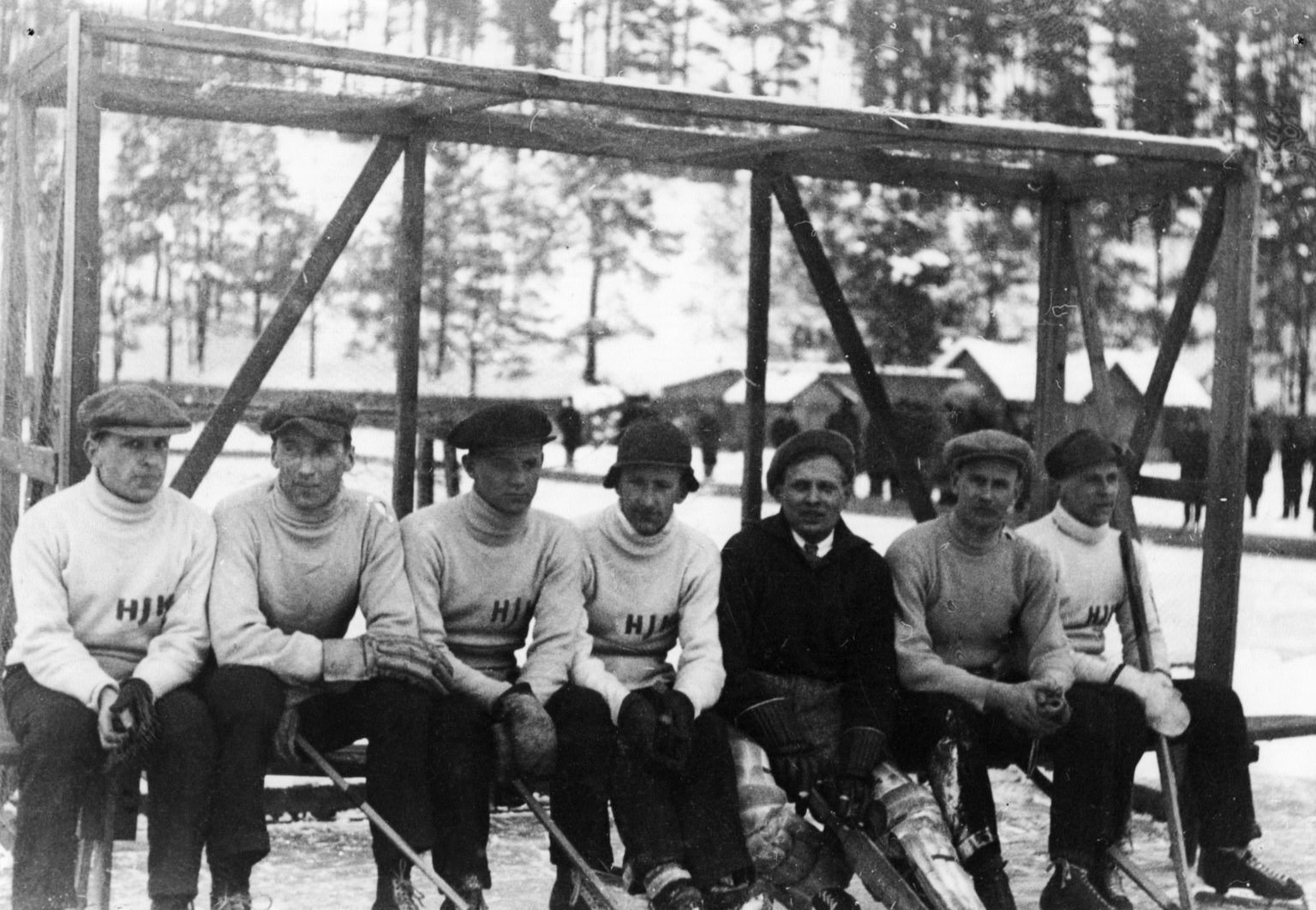
HJK's 1932 championship winning team sitting on a bench

In the 1920s, the Helsingin Jalkapalloklubi's bandy team had become one of the best clubs in the country, and a new and initially strange sport in Finland, ice hockey, was included in HJK's program as the club's second winter sport after bandy. HJK's ice hockey team participated in the first ice hockey championship in 1928. The champion Viipurin Reipas knocked HJK out in the first match. In the following season, 1929, HJK progressed to the final, where they beat the Helsingin Palloseura 5–1. The championship was the first ice hockey Finnish championship won by the Helsinki club.

HJK won the 1932 championship. They beat Helsingin Palloseura in the final match again, this time 4–0. HJK won their third and last championship in 1935, this time with no finals being held. HJK were one point ahead second place Tampereen Ilves.

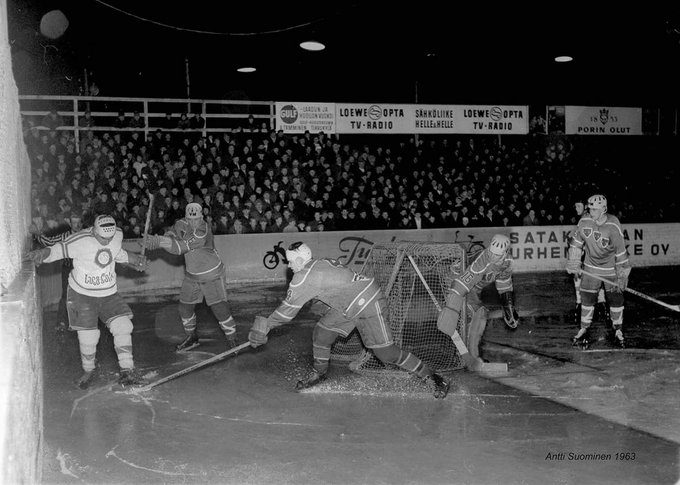
HJK player (white jersey) surrounded by Porin Karhut players in 1963.

HJK was relegated from the top tier in 1947, but would win the 2nd tier championship the following season and be promoted back to the top tier. They would avoid relegation until 1955 when they were again relegated to the second tier, where they would only play one season before being promoted back to the top flight. HJK went down again in 1966 along with their rivals HIFK and would be promoted a few years later in 1970. HJK would win the regular season of the SM-sarja in 1972, but in the final series they became second behind Ilves.

The 1971–72 season was HJK's last. The ice hockey section of the club became independent under the name Helsingin Jääkiekkoklubi, which took HJK's place in the SM-sarja.
