= 2025–26 Vancouver Goldeneyes season =

Professional Women's Hockey League season

2025–26 Vancouver Goldeneyes
- League: 6th PWHL
- 2025–26 record: 9–3–4–14
- Home record: 6–2–3–4
- Road record: 3–1–1–10
- Goals for: 64
- Goals against: 78

Team information
- General manager: Cara Gardner Morey
- Coach: Brian Idalski
- Captain: Ashton Bell
- Alternate captains: Sarah Nurse; Claire Thompson
- Arena: Pacific Coliseum
- Average attendance: 11,235

Team leaders
- Goals: Jenn Gardiner; Sophie Jaques; Sarah Nurse (9)
- Assists: Claire Thompson (13)
- Points: Sophie Jaques (20)
- Penalty minutes: Claire Thompson (16)
- Plus/minus: Tereza Vanišová (+6)
- Wins: Emerance Maschmeyer (7)
- Goals against average: Kristen Campbell (2.17)

The 2025–26 Vancouver Goldeneyes season is the team's ongoing first season as an expansion member of the Professional Women's Hockey League. They play their home games at Pacific Coliseum in Vancouver, British Columbia.

== Schedule and results ==
=== Preseason ===
The preseason schedule was published on October 8, 2025.

Pre-season camp

Date	Opponent	Score	OT	Decision	Location	Box Score/Recap
November 15	Seattle	3–0		Maschmeyer	Pacific Coliseum	
November 16	Seattle	2–4		Campbell	Pacific Coliseum	

=== Standings ===
Pos	Team	Pld	W	OTW	OTL	L	GF	GA	GD	Pts	Qualification
1	Montreal Victoire (Y)	30	16	6	2	6	78	41	+37	62 (Note: Greater number of games won, excluding games won by Shootout: Montreal 19, Boston 18)	Playoffs
2	Boston Fleet	30	16	5	4	5	74	45	+29	62	Playoffs
3	Minnesota Frost	30	13	3	5	9	91	73	+18	50	Playoffs
4	Ottawa Charge	30	9	8	1	12	71	73	−2	44	Playoffs
5	Toronto Sceptres	30	10	1	6	13	51	72	−21	38	
6	Vancouver Goldeneyes	30	9	3	4	14	68	81	−13	37	
7	New York Sirens	30	9	3	3	15	63	83	−20	36	
8	Seattle Torrent	30	8	1	5	16	64	92	−28	31	

Updated to match(es) played on April 25, 2026. Source: PWHL
(Y) Regular season winner

=== Regular season ===
The regular season schedule was published on October 1, 2025.

Regular season schedule (Home: 6–2–3–4; Road: 3–1–1–10)
November: 0–1–0–2, 2 points (Home: 0–1–0–0; Road: 0–0–0–2)

Game	Date	Opponent	Score	OT	Decision	Location	Attendance	Record	Points	Box Score/Recap
1	November 21	Seattle	4–3	OT	Maschmeyer	Pacific Coliseum	14,958	0–1–0–0	2	
2	November 26	@ Ottawa	1–5		Maschmeyer	TD Place Arena	5,507	0–1–0–1	2	
3	November 29	@ New York	1–5		Campbell	Prudential Center	3,517	0–1–0–2	2	

December: 2–0–1–3, 7 points (Home: 2–0–1–1; Road: 0–0–0–2)

Game	Date	Opponent	Score	OT	Decision	Location	Attendance	Record	Points	Box Score/Recap
4	December 3	@ Boston	0–2		Maschmeyer	Agganis Arena	3,516	0–1–0–3	2	
5	December 6	New York	4–0		Maschmeyer	Pacific Coliseum	9,502	1–1–0–3	5	
6	December 16	Ottawa	2–1		Campbell	Pacific Coliseum	9,250	2–1–0–3	8	
7	December 20	Montreal	2–4		Maschmeyer	Pacific Coliseum	12,127	2–1–0–4	8	
8	December 27	Minnesota	1–2	OT	Maschmeyer	Rogers Place	10,264	2–1–1–4	9	
9	December 31	@ New York	0–2		Maschmeyer	Prudential Center	2,735	2–1–1–5	9	

January: 3–0–1–3, 10 points (Home: 1–0–0–0; Road: 2–0–1–3)

Game	Date	Opponent	Score	OT	Decision	Location	Attendance	Record	Points	Box Score/Recap
10	January 3	@ Boston	4–3		Maschmeyer	Little Caesars Arena	9,624	3–1–1–5	12	
11	January 9	@ Ottawa	2–4		Campbell	TD Place Arena	7,889	3–1–1–6	12	
12	January 11	@ Montreal	0–1		Maschmeyer	Videotron Centre	14,624	3–1–1–7	12	
13	January 17	@ Toronto	1–2	OT	Maschmeyer	Scotiabank Arena	17,856	3–1–2–7	13	
14	January 22	Toronto	5–0		Campbell	Pacific Coliseum	14,006	4–1–2–7	16	
15	January 25	@ Seattle	3–1		Maschmeyer	Ball Arena	11,612	5–1–2–7	19	
16	January 28	@ Minnesota	1–4		Campbell	Grand Casino Arena	5,249	5–1–2–8	19	

March: 2–0–2–3, 8 points (Home: 1–0–2–2; Road: 1–0–0–1)

Game	Date	Opponent	Score	OT	Decision	Location	Attendance	Record	Points	Box Score/Recap
17	March 1	Toronto	1–2		Maschmeyer	Pacific Coliseum	13,264	5–1–2–9	19	
18	March 10	Boston	1–2	OT	Campbell	Pacific Coliseum	9,731	5–1–3–9	20	
19	March 14	Ottawa	2–3	OT	Campbell	Pacific Coliseum	11,201	5–1–4–9	21	
20	March 18	New York	5–2		Campbell	Pacific Coliseum	9,296	6–1–4–9	24	
21	March 21	Minnesota	1–3		Campbell	Pacific Coliseum	10,366	6–1–4–10	24	
22	March 24	@ Boston	0–2		Campbell	Tsongas Center	4,178	6–1–4–11	24	
23	March 29	@ Toronto	3–2		Maschmeyer	Coca-Cola Coliseum	8,631	7–1–4–11	27	

April: 2–2–0–3, 10 points (Home: 2–1–0–1; Road: 0–1–0–2)

Game	Date	Opponent	Score	OT	Decision	Location	Attendance	Record	Points	Box Score/Recap
24	April 1	@ Montreal	0–3		Maschmeyer	Place Bell	9,176	7–1–4–12	27	
25	April 4	@ Minnesota	5–6		Maschmeyer	Grand Casino Arena	8,392	7–1–4–13	27	
26	April 7	Boston	1–5		Maschmeyer	Rogers Place	10,794	7–1–4–14	27	
27	April 14	Seattle	4–1		Maschmeyer	Pacific Coliseum	10,094	8–1–4–14	30	
28	April 18	@ Seattle	6–5	OT	Campbell	Climate Pledge Arena	12,719	8–2–4–14	32	
29	April 21	Montreal	4–3		Campbell	Pacific Coliseum	10,946	9–2–4–14	35	
30	April 25	Minnesota	4–3	OT	Maschmeyer	Pacific Coliseum	11,310	9–3–4–14	36	

Regulation Win (3 points) Overtime/Shootout win (2 points) Overtime/shootout loss (1 point) Regulation Loss (0 points)

== Player statistics ==
As of April 25, 2026

=== Skaters ===
Regular Season
Player	GP	G	A	Pts	SOG	+/−	PIM
Sophie Jaques	30	9	11	20	110	–1	8
Jenn Gardiner	30	9	10	19	59	0	4
Hannah Miller	30	7	11	18	77	–5	12
Claire Thompson	28	4	13	17	46	–1	18
Sarah Nurse	19	9	6	15	71	+1	10
Tereza Vanišová	30	4	11	15	57	+6	10
Izzy Daniel	28	7	3	10	39	–4	12
Abby Boreen	30	4	5	9	57	–1	14
Michelle Karvinen	30	3	6	9	43	–6	16
Ashton Bell	30	2	4	6	26	+2	0
Mannon McMahon	17	3	1	4	19	–4	8
Anna Meixner	17	1	3	4	21	+2	0
Nina Jobst-Smith	20	0	3	3	32	–2	0
Gabby Rosenthal	26	1	1	2	24	–1	12
Anna Segedi	27	1	1	2	17	–4	2
Sydney Bard	30	0	2	2	19	–7	0
Mellissa Channell-Watkins	30	0	2	2	23	–1	4
Anna Shokhina	16	1	0	1	7	–1	4
Katie Chan	17	1	0	1	6	–4	4
Maddy Samoskevich	27	1	0	1	5	–2	6
Darcie Lappan	12	0	1	1	4	0	0
Sini Karjalainen	2	0	0	0	0	0	0
Malia Schneider	3	0	0	0	1	0	0

=== Goaltenders ===
Regular Season
Player	GP	TOI	W	L	OT	SOL	GA	GAA	SA	SV%	SO	G	A	PIM
Emerance Maschmeyer	19	1072:24	7	9	2	0	46	2.57	547	0.916	1	0	0	0
Kristen Campbell	13	719:44	5	5	2	0	26	2.17	300	0.913	1	0	0	0

== Awards and honours ==
=== Milestones ===
Regular season
Date	Player	Milestone
November 21, 2025	Sarah Nurse	1st goal in franchise history
November 21, 2025	Abby Boreen	1st game-winning goal in franchise history
November 21, 2025	Abby Boreen	1st assist in franchise history
November 21, 2025	Claire Thompson	5th career PWHL goal
November 21, 2025	Katie Chan	1st career PWHL game
November 21, 2025	Michelle Karvinen	1st career PWHL game
November 21, 2025	Darcie Lappan	1st career PWHL game
November 21, 2025	Maddy Samoskevich	1st career PWHL game
November 21, 2025	Emerance Maschmeyer	1st overtime win in franchise history
November 26, 2025	Michela Cava	20th career PWHL assist
November 26, 2025	Michelle Karvinen	1st career PWHL assist
November 26, 2025	Katie Chan	1st career PWHL penalty
November 26, 2025	Emerance Maschmeyer	1st loss in franchise history
November 26, 2025	Anna Segedi	1st career PWHL game
December 6, 2025	Jenn Gardiner	15th career PWHL assist
December 6, 2025	Maddy Samoskevich	1st career PWHL penalty
December 6, 2025	Emerance Maschmeyer	1st regulation win in franchise history
December 6, 2025	Emerance Maschmeyer	1st shutout in franchise history
December 16, 2025	Katie Chan	1st career PWHL goal
December 20, 2025	Sophie Jaques	15th career PWHL goal
December 27, 2025	Ashton Bell	10th career PWHL assist
December 27, 2025	Darcie Lappan	1st career PWHL assist
January 3, 2026	Hannah Miller	20th career PWHL goal
January 9, 2026	Michelle Karvinen	1st career PWHL goal
January 9, 2026	Nina Jobst-Smith	1st career PWHL game
January 17, 2026	Nina Jobst-Smith	1st career PWHL assist
January 22, 2026	Sarah Nurse	20th career PWHL goal
January 22, 2026	Izzy Daniel	5th career PWHL goal
January 22, 2026	Jenn Gardiner	20th career PWHL assist
January 25, 2026	Hannah Miller	30th career PWHL assist
March 18, 2026	Tereza Vanišová	20th career PWHL goal
March 18, 2026	Anna Segedi	1st career PWHL goal
March 18, 2026	Anna Meixner	5th career PWHL assist
April 4, 2026	Sophie Jaques	20th career PWHL goal
April 4, 2026	Claire Thompson	30th career PWHL assist
April 14, 2026	Maddy Samoskevich	1st career PWHL goal
April 14, 2026	Anna Segedi	1st career PWHL assist
April 18, 2026	Jenn Gardiner	10th career PWHL goal
April 18, 2026	Jenn Gardiner	1st career PWHL hat trick
April 18, 2026	Sophie Jaques	40th career PWHL assist
April 18, 2026	Michelle Karvinen	5th career PWHL assist
April 21, 2026	Tereza Vanišová	30th career PWHL assist
April 25, 2026	Abby Boreen	15th career PWHL assist

=== Player of the Week Awards ===
==== Starting Six ====
The Starting Six is voted on each month by the Women's Chapter of the Professional Hockey Writers' Association (PHWA) and PWHL broadcast personnel. The following are Vancouver Goldeneyes players who have been named to the Starting Six.

Starting Six players
Month	Position	Player
November	D	Claire Thompson

=== 2026 PWHL Awards ===
==== Defender of the Year ====
Sophie Jaques was a finalist for the PWHL's Defender of the Year Award for the 2025-2026 season, along with Megan Keller of the Boston Fleet and Renata Fast of the Toronto Sceptres. The award went to Keller.

== Transactions ==
=== Draft ===
The 2025 PWHL Draft was held on June 24, 2025. Vancouver made five draft picks, selecting longtime Finland women's national ice hockey team forward Michelle Karvinen at seventh overall. She was the first pick in franchise history, followed by Nina Jobst-Smith at 19, Brianna Brooks at 32, Maddy Samoskevich at 39, and Chanreet Bassi at 48. They were originally assigned picks 16 and 23 but traded them to the Toronto Sceptres in exchange for pick 19 and goaltender Kristen Campbell.

Due to the additions of the Vancouver and Seattle teams, an expansion draft was held on June 9, 2025. Vancouver acquired Ashton Bell, Brooke McQuigge, Abigail Boreen, Izzy Daniel, Gabby Rosenthal, Denisa Křížová, and Sydney Bard in the expansion draft.

Drafted prospect signings
Date	Player	Draft	Term	Ref
October 6, 2025	Michelle Karvinen	First round, Seventh overall (2025)	One year	
October 28, 2025	Nina Jobst-Smith	Third round, 19th overall (2025)	Two years	
October 28, 2025	Brianna Brooks	Fourth round, 32nd overall (2025)	One year	
October 28, 2025	Madison Samoskevich	Fifth round, 39th overall (2025)	One year	

=== Free agency ===
The free agency period began on June 16, 2025 at 9:00 am ET, with a pause between June 27 and July 8. Prior to the start of the free agency period, there was an exclusive signing window from June 4–8 for the Seattle and Vancouver expansion teams.

Free agent signings
Date	Player	Previous team	Term	Ref
June 4, 2025 (Note: Expansion team exclusive signing window.)	Claire Thompson	Minnesota Frost	One year	
June 4, 2025	Sophie Jaques	Minnesota Frost	Three years	
June 5, 2025	Emerance Maschmeyer	Ottawa Charge	Two years	
June 5, 2025	Sarah Nurse	Toronto Sceptres	One year	
June 5, 2025	Jennifer Gardiner	Montreal Victoire	One year	
June 16, 2025	Hannah Miller	Toronto Sceptres	Three years	
June 17, 2025	Michela Cava	Minnesota Frost	Two years	
June 17, 2025	Tereza Vanišová	Ottawa Charge	Two years	
June 17, 2025	Mellissa Channell-Watkins	Minnesota Frost	One year	
June 17, 2025	Emma Greco	Boston Fleet	Two years	
June 20, 2025	Gabby Rosenthal	New York Sirens (Note: Restricted free agent selected in expansion draft.)	One year	
July 11, 2025	Brooke McQuigge	Minnesota Frost	One year	
November 20, 2025	Katie Chan	Färjestad BK (SDHL)	One year	
November 20, 2025	Kimberly Newell	KRS Vanke Rays (ZhHL)	One year	
November 20, 2025	Brianna Brooks	Vancouver Goldeneyes (Note: Initially signed to a one year standard player agreement that was terminated after being cut from training camp.)	Reserve player contract	
November 20, 2025	Darcie Lappan	MoDo Hockey (SDHL)	Reserve player contract (Note: Subsequently signed a standard player agreement following training camp to fill in for Nina Jobst-Smith who is on LTIR. Length of contract has not been specified.)	
November 20, 2025	Malia Schneider	SDE Hockey (SDHL)	Reserve player contract	

=== Contract extensions/terminations ===
Player contract extensions
Date	Player	Term	Ref
August 14, 2025	Ashton Bell	Two years (Note: Extension will come into effect for the 2026–27 season.)	

Player contract terminations
Date	Player	Term remaining	Ref
November 19, 2025	Brianna Brooks	One year (Note: Released from preseason/training camp.)	

=== Trades ===
Trades involving the Goldeneyes
Date	Details		Ref
June 24, 2025	To Vancouver Goldeneyes Kristen Campbell; Third round pick – 2025 PWHL Draft (#19 – Nina Jobst-Smith)	To Toronto Sceptres Second round pick – 2025 PWHL Draft (#16 – Kiara Zanon); Third round pick – 2025 PWHL Draft (#23 – Clara Van Wieren)	
November 19, 2025	To Minnesota Frost Denisa Křížová	To Vancouver Goldeneyes Anna Segedi	
January 18, 2026	To Ottawa Charge Michela Cava; Brooke McQuigge; Emma Greco	To Vancouver Goldeneyes Mannon McMahon; Anna Meixner; Anna Shokhina	

=== Reserve activations ===
Reserve player activations
Date	Activated player	Absent player	Notes	Ref
November 20, 2025	Darcie Lappan	Nina Jobst-Smith	LTIR	
December 5, 2025	Malia Schneider	Sarah Nurse	LTIR	
January 22, 2026	Malia Schneider	N/A	10 day contract	
