= List of Vancouver Goldeneyes players =

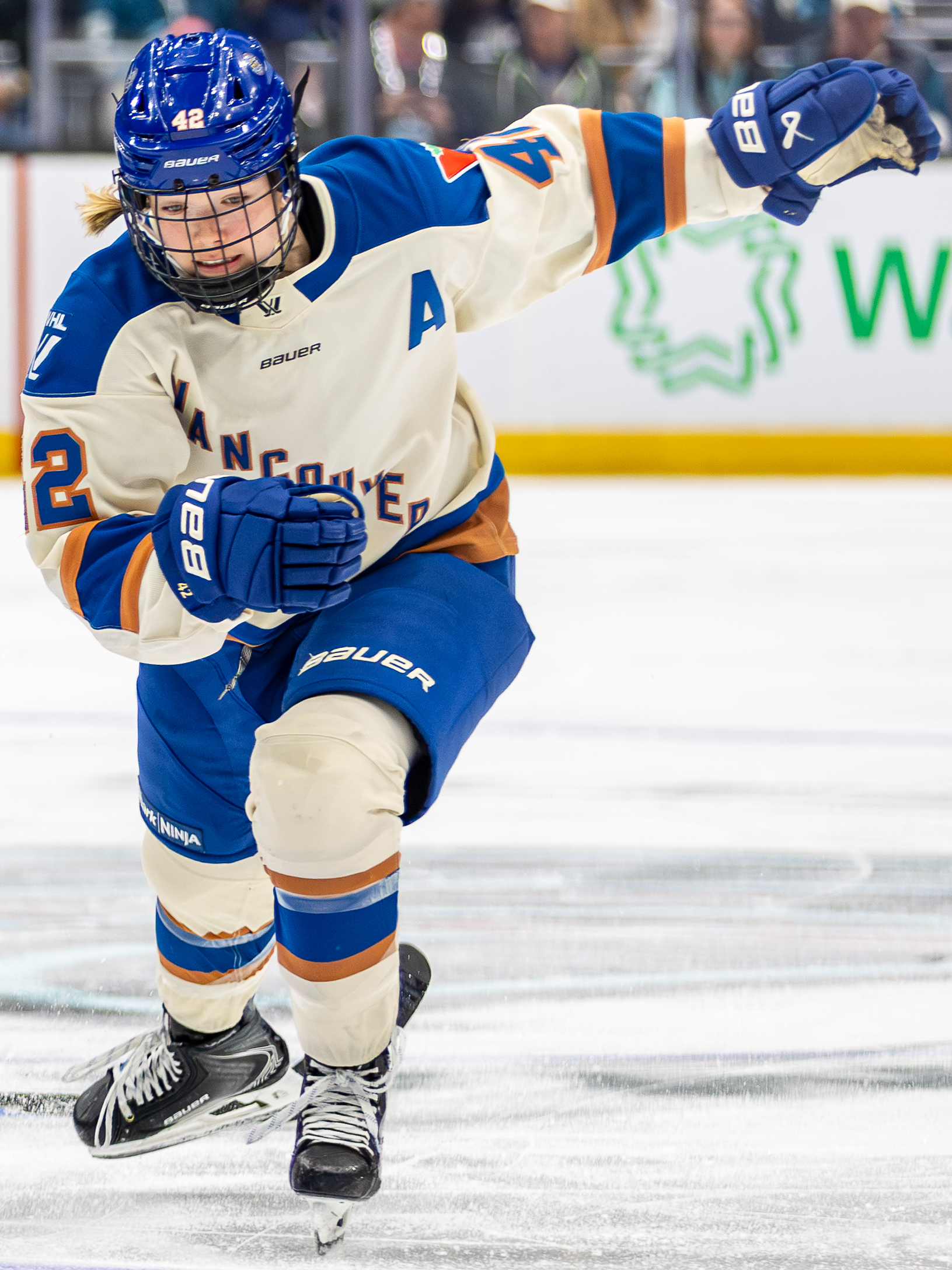
Claire Thompson, one of the first players in franchise history.

The Vancouver Goldeneyes are a professional women's ice hockey team based in Vancouver, British Columbia, and members of the Professional Women's Hockey League (PWHL). The franchise was announced on April 23, 2025, as the league's first expansion team, with Seattle being added one week later to bring the PWHL to eight clubs. The Goldeneyes began play during the 2025–26 season and play their home games at Pacific Coliseum, a historic venue that previously hosted the NHL's Vancouver Canucks. The club's creation followed the success of the PWHL Takeover Tour game at Rogers Arena in January 2025, which drew 19,038 fans and demonstrated strong support for professional women's hockey in British Columbia.

The team name and identity, unveiled on November 6, 2025, draw inspiration from the Common Goldeneye, a diving duck native to British Columbia's coastal waters and inland lakes, and were selected to symbolize speed, resilience, precision, and adaptability. The team's primary colours are Pacific Blue, Coastal Cream, and Earthy Bronze, with accent colours Sunset Gold and Sky Blue. Its crest features a stylized golden eye framed by wings pointing toward the Pacific Northwest, reflecting both the region's geography and the franchise's ambitions.

Vancouver assembled its first roster through the 2025 PWHL expansion process and quickly became one of the league's most recognizable new franchises, anchored by a core that included Canadian national team standouts Ashton Bell, Sarah Nurse, Claire Thompson, Emerance Maschmeyer, and Kristen Campbell. Bell was selected first overall in the 2025 PWHL Expansion Draft and was subsequently named the first captain in franchise history on November 21, 2025, with Nurse and Thompson serving as alternate captains.

The Goldeneyes played their first regular-season game on November 21, 2025, hosting fellow expansion club Seattle in the opening game of the Pacific Northwest rivalry. Vancouver won its inaugural game in overtime, becoming the first of the two expansion franchises to record a victory. The matchup marked the beginning of what the league envisioned as one of its premier regional rivalries and helped establish a strong hockey presence for the PWHL on the West Coast.

As of the conclusion of the 2025–26 season, a total of 29 players have suited up for the Goldeneyes: 2 goaltenders and 27 skaters.

== Key ==
Key of colours and symbols
#	Number worn for majority of tenure with the Goldeneyes
WC	Walter Cup Champion
*	Current member of the Goldeneyes organization (including reserves)
†	Walter Cup champion, retired jersey, or elected to the Hockey Hall of Fame

Skaters
Pos	Position
D	Defender
F	Forward

The seasons column lists the first year of the season of the player's first game and the last year of the season of the player's last game. For example, a player who played one game in the 2023–24 season would be listed as playing with the team from 2023–24, regardless of what calendar year the game occurred within.

Statistics are complete to the end of the 2025–26 PWHL season.

== Goaltenders ==
Note: GP = Games played; Min, TOI = Minutes played; W = Wins; L = Losses; OTL = Overtime losses; GA = Goals-against; GAA = Goals-against average; SO = Shutouts; SV% = Save percentage;

Name	#	Nationality	Seasons	Regular season							Playoffs						Notes
Name	#	Nationality	Seasons	GP	W	L	OTL	SO	GAA	SV%	GP	W	L	SO	GAA	SV%	Notes
Campbell, Kristen*	50	Canada	2025–present	13	5	5	2	1	2.17	.913	0	0	0	0	0.00	.000	
Maschmeyer, Emerance*	38	Canada	2025–present	19	7	9	2	1	2.57	.916	0	0	0	0	0.00	.000	

== Skaters ==
Note: GP = Games played; G = Goals; A = Assists; Pts = Points; PIM = Penalty minutes;

Name	#	Nationality	Pos	Seasons	Regular season					Playoffs					Notes
Name	#	Nationality	Pos	Seasons	GP	G	A	Pts	PIM	GP	G	A	Pts	PIM	Notes
Bard, Sydney	11	United States	D	2025–2026	30	0	2	2	0	0	0	0	0	0	
Bell, Ashton*	21	Canada	D	2025–present	30	2	4	6	0	0	0	0	0	0	Intact Impact Award 2026; Captain 2025–present
Boreen, Abby*	22	United States	F	2025–present	30	4	5	9	14	0	0	0	0	0	
Brooks, Briana	17	Canada	F	2025–2026	1	0	0	0	0	0	0	0	0	0	
Cava, Michela	86	Canada	F	2025–2026	13	1	4	5	4	0	0	0	0	0	
Chan, Katie*	9	Canada	F	2025–present	17	1	0	1	4	0	0	0	0	0	
Channell-Watkins, Mellissa	23	Canada	D	2025–2026	30	0	2	2	4	0	0	0	0	0	
Daniel, Izzy*	8	United States	F	2025–present	28	7	3	10	12	0	0	0	0	0	
Gardiner, Jennifer*	12	Canada	F	2025–present	30	9	10	19	4	0	0	0	0	0	
Greco, Emma	25	Canada	D	2025–2026	13	0	0	0	19	0	0	0	0	0	
Jaques, Sophie*	16	Canada	D	2025–present	30	9	11	20	8	0	0	0	0	0	
Jobst-Smith, Nina	28	Canada	D	2025–2026	20	0	3	3	0	0	0	0	0	0	
Karjalainen, Sini*	2	Finland	D	2025–present	2	0	0	0	0	0	0	0	0	0	
Karvinen, Michelle*	33	Denmark	F	2025–present	30	3	6	9	16	0	0	0	0	0	
Lappan, Darcie	72	Canada	F	2025–2026	12	0	1	1	0	0	0	0	0	0	
McMahon, Mannon*	19	United States	F	2025–present	17	3	1	4	8	0	0	0	0	0	
McQuigge, Brooke	26	Canada	F	2025–2026	13	0	1	1	6	0	0	0	0	0	
Meixner, Anna*	94	Austria	F	2025–present	17	1	3	4	0	0	0	0	0	0	
Miller, Hannah*	34	Canada	F	2025–present	30	7	11	18	12	0	0	0	0	0	
Nurse, Sarah*	20	Canada	F	2025–present	19	9	6	15	10	0	0	0	0	0	
Rosenthal, Gabby*	15	United States	F	2025–present	26	1	1	2	12	0	0	0	0	0	
Samoskevich, Maddy*	7	United States	D	2025–present	27	1	0	1	6	0	0	0	0	0	
Schneider, Malia*	18	Canada	F	2025–present	3	0	0	0	0	0	0	0	0	0	
Segedi, Anna*	51	United States	F	2025–present	21	1	1	2	2	0	0	0	0	0	
Shokhina, Anna*	97	Russia	F	2025–present	16	1	0	1	4	0	0	0	0	0	
Thompson, Claire	42	Canada	D	2025–2026	28	4	13	17	18	0	0	0	0	0	
Vanišová, Tereza*	13	Czech Republic	F	2025–present	30	4	11	15	10	0	0	0	0	0	
