= 2024 PWHL Draft =

2nd PWHL Draft

General information
- Date: June 10, 2024
- Location: Roy Wilkins Auditorium; Saint Paul, Minnesota, U.S.

Overview
- 42 total selections in 7 rounds
- League: Professional Women's Hockey League
- First selection: (Canada) Sarah Fillier (PWHL New York)

The 2024 PWHL Draft was the second annual draft in Professional Women's Hockey League history, and took place on June 10, 2024, at the Roy Wilkins Auditorium in Saint Paul, Minnesota.

Sarah Fillier was selected first overall by PWHL New York.

== Eligibility ==
The declaration period for the draft opened on March 1, 2024, and closed on May 8. Undrafted players would become free agents; players must declare for the draft to reach free agency. Selected players may re-enter the draft if they are not signed to their draft club after two years. No player may declare for more than two drafts. Players ineligible to play in the 2024–25 season were not eligible to be selected.

On May 25, 2024, the PWHL released the full list of eligible players. In total, 167 eligible players declared for the draft, of which 93 were forwards, 48 were defensemen, and 26 were goaltenders.

== Top prospects ==
=== Top skaters ===
Source: The Hockey News (May 28, 2024) ranking.

Ranking	Player	School/club team
1	(Canada) Sarah Fillier (C)	Princeton University (NCAA)
2	(United States) Hannah Bilka (LW)	Ohio State University (NCAA)
3	(Canada) Danielle Serdachny (C)	Colgate University (NCAA)
4	(United States) Cayla Barnes (D)	Ohio State University (NCAA)
5	(Canada) Claire Thompson (D)	Did not play
6	(Finland) Ronja Savolainen (D)	Luleå HF/MSSK (SDHL)
7	(United States) Amanda Kessel (F)	Did not play
8	(Canada) Julia Gosling (C)	St. Lawrence University (NCAA)
9	(Czech Republic) Daniela Pejšová (D)	Luleå HF/MSSK (SDHL)
10	(Finland) Noora Tulus (F)	Luleå HF/MSSK (SDHL)

Source: The Athletic (June 4, 2024) ranking.

Ranking	Player	School/club team
1	(Canada) Sarah Fillier (C)	Princeton University (NCAA)
2	(Canada) Danielle Serdachny (C)	Colgate University (NCAA)
3	(United States) Hannah Bilka (LW)	Ohio State University (NCAA)
4	(Canada) Claire Thompson (D)	Did not play
5	(United States) Cayla Barnes (D)	Ohio State University (NCAA)
6	(United States) Amanda Kessel (F)	Did not play
7	(United States) Britta Curl (F)	University of Wisconsin (NCAA)
8	(Canada) Julia Gosling (C)	St. Lawrence University (NCAA)
9	(United States) Izzy Daniel (F)	Cornell University (NCAA)
10	(Finland) Ronja Savolainen (D)	Luleå HF/MSSK (SDHL)

=== Top goaltenders ===
Source: The Hockey News (May 28, 2024) ranking.

Ranking	Player	School/club team
1	(Czech Republic) Klára Peslarová	Brynäs IF (SDHL)
2	(United States) Gwyneth Philips	Northeastern University (NCAA)
3	(Canada) Kayle Osborne	Colgate University (NCAA)

Source: The Athletic (June 4, 2024) ranking

Ranking	Player	School/club team
1	(United States) Gwyneth Philips	Northeastern University (NCAA)
2	(Czech Republic) Klára Peslarová	Brynäs IF (SDHL)
3	(Canada) Kayle Osborne	Colgate University (NCAA)

== Format ==
The six teams picked in each of seven rounds for a total of 42 selections. The top two selections in the draft were determined by the Gold Plan, where standings points accumulated by a team that can no longer make the playoffs count as draft order points, and the team with the most draft order points received the first overall selection. Picks three through six went to the four playoff teams, in reverse order of regular season standings. The draft order was the same in each subsequent round.

The draft order was as follows:

Selection	Team	Draft order points	Standings points
1	PWHL New York	6	26
2	PWHL Ottawa	0	32
3	PWHL Minnesota	—	35
4	PWHL Boston	—	35
5	PWHL Montreal	—	41
6	PWHL Toronto	—	47

Teams were permitted trade their picks beginning at the conclusion of the playoffs.

== Selections by round ==
=== Round one ===
#	Player	Nationality	PWHL team	School/club team
1	Sarah Fillier (C)	Canada	New York	Princeton University (NCAA)
2	Danielle Serdachny (C)	Canada	Ottawa	Colgate University (NCAA)
3	Claire Thompson (D)	Canada	Minnesota	Did not play
4	Hannah Bilka (LW)	United States	Boston	Ohio State University (NCAA)
5	Cayla Barnes (D)	United States	Montreal	Ohio State University (NCAA)
6	Julia Gosling (C)	Canada	Toronto	St. Lawrence University (NCAA)

=== Round two ===
#	Player	Nationality	PWHL team	School/club team
7	Daniela Pejšová (D)	Czech Republic	Boston (from New York) (Note: New York → Boston. New York's second-round pick went to Boston as the result of a trade on June 10, 2024, that sent a second-round pick (7th overall) and a seventh-round pick (37th overall) to Boston in exchange for a second-round pick (10th overall), a third-round pick (16th overall) and a fifth-round pick (28th overall).)	Luleå HF/MSSK (SDHL)
8	Ronja Savolainen (D)	Finland	Ottawa	Luleå HF/MSSK (SDHL)
9	Britta Curl (F)	United States	Minnesota	University of Wisconsin (NCAA)
10	Maja Nylén Persson (D)	Sweden	New York (from Boston) (Note: Boston → New York. Boston's second-round pick went to New York as the result of a trade on June 10, 2024, that sent a second-round pick (10th overall), a third-round pick (16th overall) and a fifth-round pick (28th overall) to New York in exchange for a second-round pick (7th overall) and a seventh-round pick (37th overall).)	Brynäs IF (SDHL)
11	Jennifer Gardiner (F)	Canada	Montreal	Ohio State University (NCAA)
12	Megan Carter (D)	Canada	Toronto	Northeastern University (NCAA)

=== Round three ===
#	Player	Nationality	PWHL team	School/club team
13	Noora Tulus (F)	Finland	New York	Luleå HF/MSSK (SDHL)
14	Gwyneth Philips (G)	United States	Ottawa	Northeastern University (NCAA)
15	Klára Hymlárová (F)	Czech Republic	Minnesota	St. Cloud State University (NCAA)
16	Allyson Simpson (D)	United States	New York (from Boston) (Note: Boston → New York. Boston's third-round pick went to New York as the result of a trade on June 10, 2024, that sent a second-round pick (10th overall), a third-round pick (16th overall) and a fifth-round pick (28th overall) to New York in exchange for a second-round pick (7th overall) and a seventh-round pick (37th overall).)	Colgate University (NCAA)
17	Abigail Boreen (F)	United States	Montreal	Minnesota (PWHL)
18	Izzy Daniel (F)	United States	Toronto	Cornell University (NCAA)

=== Round four ===
#	Player	Nationality	PWHL team	School/club team
19	Gabby Rosenthal (F)	United States	New York	Ohio State University (NCAA)
20	Stephanie Markowski (D)	Canada	Ottawa	Ohio State University (NCAA)
21	Brooke McQuigge (F)	Canada	Minnesota	Clarkson University (NCAA)
22	Sydney Bard (D)	United States	Boston	Colgate University (NCAA)
23	Dara Greig (F)	Canada	Montreal	Colgate University (NCAA)
24	Lauren Bernard (D)	United States	Toronto	Ohio State University (NCAA)

=== Round five ===
#	Player	Nationality	PWHL team	School/club team
25	Elle Hartje (F)	United States	New York	Yale University (NCAA)
26	Mannon McMahon (F)	United States	Ottawa	University of Minnesota Duluth (NCAA)
27	Dominique Petrie (F)	United States	Minnesota	Clarkson University (NCAA)
28	Kayle Osborne (G)	Canada	New York (from Boston) (Note: Boston → New York. Boston's fifth-round pick went to New York as the result of a trade on June 10, 2024, that sent a second-round pick (10th overall), a third-round pick (16th overall) and a fifth-round pick (28th overall) to New York in exchange for a second-round pick (7th overall) and a seventh-round pick (37th overall).)	Colgate University (NCAA)
29	Anna Wilgren (D)	United States	Montreal	University of Wisconsin (NCAA)
30	Noemi Neubauerová (F)	Czech Republic	Toronto	Brynäs IF (SDHL)

=== Round six ===
#	Player	Nationality	PWHL team	School/club team
31	Emmy Fecteau (F)	Canada	New York	Concordia University (U Sports)
32	Anna Meixner (F)	Austria	Ottawa	Brynäs IF (SDHL)
33	Mae Batherson (D)	Canada	Minnesota	St. Lawrence University (NCAA)
34	Shay Maloney (F)	United States	Boston	Leksands IF (SDHL)
35	Anna Kjellbin (D)	Sweden	Montreal	Luleå HF/MSSK (SDHL)
36	Anneke Linser (F)	United States	Toronto	Djurgårdens IF (SDHL)

=== Round seven ===
#	Player	Nationality	PWHL team	School/club team
37	Ilona Markova (F)	Russia	Boston (from New York) (Note: New York → Boston. New York's seventh-round pick went to Boston as the result of a trade on June 10, 2024, that sent a second-round pick (7th overall) and a seventh-round pick (37th overall) to Boston in exchange for a second-round pick (10th overall), a third-round pick (16th overall) and a fifth-round pick (28th overall).)	Agidel Ufa (ZhHL)
38	Madeline Wethington (D)	United States	Ottawa	University of Minnesota (NCAA)
39	Katy Knoll (F)	United States	Minnesota	Northeastern University (NCAA)
40	Hadley Hartmetz (D)	United States	Boston	Ohio State University (NCAA)
41	Amanda Kessel (F)	United States	Montreal	Did not play
42	Raygan Kirk (G)	Canada	Toronto	Ohio State University (NCAA)

== Draftees based on nationality ==
Rank	Country	Selections	Percent	Top selection
North America		33	78.6%	
1	Canada	13	31.0%	Sarah Fillier, 1st
2	United States	20	47.6%	Hannah Bilka, 4th
Europe		9	21.4	
3	Czechia	3	7.1%	Daniela Pejšová, 7th
4	Finland	2	4.8%	Ronja Savolainen, 8th
4	Sweden	2	4.8%	Maja Nylén Persson, 10th
6	Austria	1	2.4%	Anna Meixner, 32nd
6	Russia	1	2.4%	Ilona Markova, 37th
