= Emma Greco =

Canadian ice hockey player (born 1995)

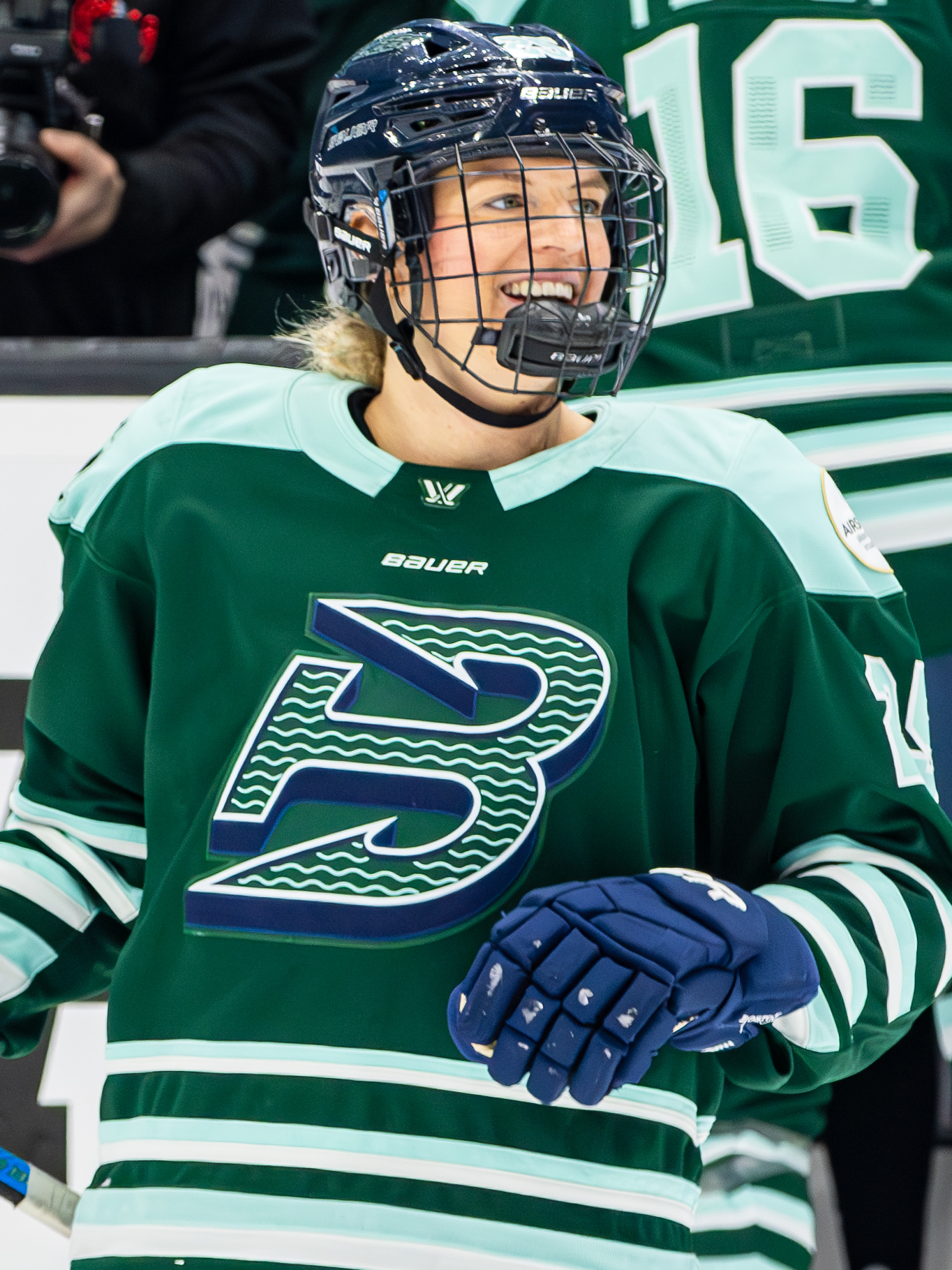
- Greco with the Boston Fleet in 2025
- Born: March 6, 1995 (age 31) Burlington, Ontario, Canada
- Height: 5 ft 9 in (175 cm)
- Weight: 165 lb (75 kg; 11 st 11 lb)
- Position: Defence
- Shoots: Left
- PWHL team Former teams: Ottawa Charge; Vancouver Goldeneyes; Boston Fleet; PWHL Minnesota; Toronto Six; PWHPA; Toronto Furies; Connecticut Whale
- Playing career: 2013–present

Emma Greco (born March 6, 1995) is a Canadian ice hockey defender for the Ottawa Charge of the Professional Women's Hockey League (PWHL). Greco has been described as a reliable stay-at-home defender.

== Playing career ==
Greco began playing hockey at the age of five, her parents encouraging her to play the sport instead of figure skating. She attended Aldershot School where she played varsity field hockey, soccer, ice hockey, and badminton in addition to playing basketball, volleyball, and softball throughout her high school career. During the later three years of high school, she also played ice hockey with the Toronto Jr. Aeros of the Ontario Women's Hockey League (OWHL), serving as team captain in her final year. As a senior, Greco was named the 2013 Aldershot Female Athlete of the Year and the City of Burlington's High School Female Athlete of the Year.

=== College ===
From 2013 to 2017, she played with the Quinnipiac Bobcats women's ice hockey program in the ECAC Hockey conference of the NCAA Division I, scoring 25 points in 144 games. She scored her first collegiate career goal in February of her third year, the game-winning goal in a 4–0 victory over Rensselaer. That year, she would be named to the ECAC Hockey All-Tournament Team, leading her team in blocked shots.

=== Professional ===
After graduating, she signed her first professional contract with the Connecticut Whale of the PHF. She picked up two assists in six games during the 2017–18 season with the Whale. Ahead of the 2018–19 season, she left the Whale to return to Canada and sign with the Toronto Furies of the Canadian Women's Hockey League.

After the collapse of the CWHL in May 2019, she joined the newly-formed Professional Women's Hockey Players Association (PWHPA), and spent the 2019–20 season playing with the organisation's Greater Toronto Area (GTA) West hub. She played for Team Knox at the Unifor Showcase in September 2019 and participated in the PWHPA's Equal Sweat Deserves Equal Opportunity rally in Toronto in January 2020.

She returned to the PHF ahead of the 2020–21 NWHL season, signing with the expansion Toronto Six and was one of the first five players to be announced for the team. The leadership for the inaugural season included Greco, who served as one of the alternate captains with Emma Woods, while Shiann Darkangelo appointed as the first team captain in franchise history. Competing in the Six’s first-ever game, a January 23, 2021, affair at Lake Placid’s Herb Brooks Arena versus the Metropolitan Riveters, Greco would be called for interference at the 3:01 mark of the first period, recording the first penalty in franchise history.

During the 2023–24 season she played for PWHL Minnesota where she won the inaugural Walter Cup. On July 9, 2024, she signed a one-year contract with PWHL Boston. During the 2024–25 season, she recorded three assists in 28 games for the Fleet. On June 17, 2025, she signed a two-year contract with the Vancouver Goldeneyes.

On January 18, 2026, Greco was traded to the Ottawa Charge, along with Michela Cava and Brooke McQuigge, in exchange for Mannon McMahon, Anna Meixner, and Anna Shokhina.

== Personal life ==
Greco has a bachelor's degree in business and marketing from Quinnipiac University. While pursuing her MBA at Qunnipiac, she played with the Quinnipiac Bobcats women's soccer team for the 2017 season, appearing in 15 games, including 14 starts.

She has been in a relationship with her Ottawa Charge teammate Michela Cava since October 2022. The two were also teammates on the Vancouver Goldeneyes, PWHL Minnesota, and the Toronto Six. They got engaged on September 9, 2026.

== Career statistics ==
Note: GP = Games played; G = Goals; A = Assists; Pts = Points; PIM = Penalty minutes;

			Regular season					Playoffs
Season	Team	League	GP	G	A	Pts	PIM	GP	G	A	Pts	PIM
2013–14	Quinnipiac Bobcats	ECAC	37	0	3	3	14	—	—	—	—	—
2014–15	Quinnipiac Bobcats	ECAC	32	0	5	5	10	—	—	—	—	—
2015–16	Quinnipiac Bobcats	ECAC	38	2	5	7	26	—	—	—	—	—
2016–17	Quinnipiac Bobcats	ECAC	37	0	10	10	22	—	—	—	—	—
2017–18	Connecticut Whale	NWHL	6	0	2	2	4	1	0	0	0	0
2018–19	Toronto Furies	CWHL	23	0	3	3	12	—	—	—	—	—
2019–20	GTA West	PWHPA	—	—	—	—	—	—	—	—	—	—
2020–21	Toronto Six	NWHL	6	0	1	1	4	1	0	0	0	0
2022–23	Toronto Six	PHF	24	1	4	5	18	4	0	1	1	2
2023–24	PWHL Minnesota	PWHL	22	0	0	0	10	10	0	0	0	6
2024–25	Boston Fleet	PWHL	28	0	3	3	8	—	—	—	—	—
2025–26	Vancouver Goldeneyes	PWHL	13	0	0	0	19	—	—	—	—	—
2025–26	Ottawa Charge	PWHL	17	0	2	2	6	8	0	0	0	2
NWHL/PHF totals			36	1	7	8	26	6	0	1	1	2
CWHL totals			23	0	3	3	12	—	—	—	—	—
PWHPA totals			—	—	—	—	—	—	—	—	—	—
PWHL totals			80	0	5	5	43	18	0	0	0	8
