= Anna Shokhina =

Russian ice hockey player (born 1997)

Anna Shokhina Анна Шохина
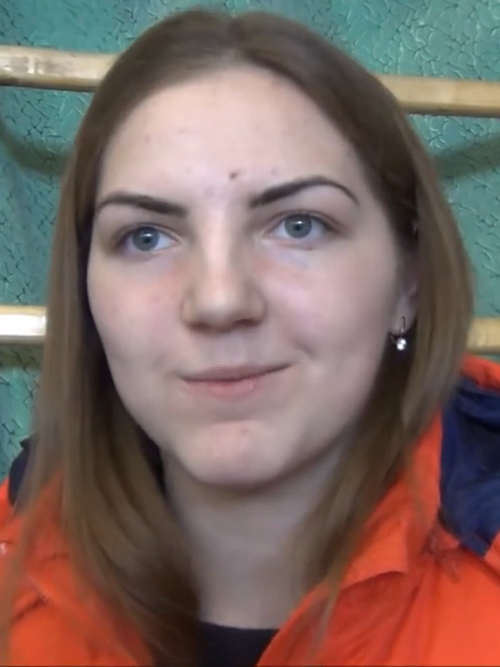
- Shokhina in 2018
- Born: 23 June 1997 (age 29) Novosinkovo, Moscow Oblast, Russia
- Height: 1.69 m (5 ft 7 in)
- Weight: 67 kg (148 lb; 10 st 8 lb)
- Position: Right wing
- Shoots: Left
- PWHL team Former teams: Hamilton Havoc; Vancouver Goldeneyes; Ottawa Charge; Dynamo-Neva St. Petersburg; Tornado Dmitrov
- National team: Russia
- Playing career: 2012–present
Medal record
Universiade
Gold medal – first place	2019 Krasnoyarsk	Ice hockey
Gold medal – first place	2017 Almaty	Ice hockey

Anna Konstantinovna Shokhina (Russian: Анна Константиновна Шохина; born 23 June 1997) is a Russian ice hockey player for the Hamilton Havoc in the Professional Women's Hockey League (PWHL) and member of the Russian national team.

== Playing career ==
Shokhina has been the top scorer of the Zhenskaya Hockey League (ZhHL) on six occasions and earned All-Star honors in eight consecutive seasons. She was recognized as Russia's top player in both 2017 and 2022. Over her ZhHL career, she accumulated 833 points in 430 games, maintaining an impressive average of 1.94 points per game. While she spent the majority of her career with Tornado Dmitrov, she joined Dynamo-Neva St. Petersburg for the 2024–25 season. That year, she tallied 30 goals and 73 points across 42 games.

Shokhina entered the 2025 PWHL Draft, expressing her excitement by saying, "This is one of the strongest leagues in the world, and I'm very interested in competing at this level." She was selected by the Ottawa Charge with the 13th overall pick in the second round of the draft. On 14 July 2025, both Shokhina and compatriot Fanuza Kadirova signed one-year contracts with the Charge for the 2025–26 season, becoming the first Russian players to sign in the PWHL.

On 18 January 2026, Shokhina was traded to the Vancouver Goldeneyes, along with Mannon McMahon and Anna Meixner, in exchange for Michela Cava, Emma Greco, and Brooke McQuigge.

On 10 July 2026, Shokhina signed a one-year standard player agreement with the Hamilton Havoc.

== International play ==
At 17 years old, Shokhina competed for Russia in the women's ice hockey tournament at the 2014 Winter Olympics, where she scored a goal in a 6–3 win over Japan and finished the tournament with one goal and three assists. When Russia was banned from the 2018 Winter Olympics, she chose to play under the Olympic Athletes from Russia team in the women's ice hockey tournament.
