= Darcie Lappan =

Canadian ice hockey player (born 2001)

- Born: September 15, 2001 (age 25) Kingston, Ontario, Canada
- Height: 5 ft 7 in (170 cm)
- Position: Forward
- Shoots: Left
- PWHL team Former teams: Vegas Vanguards; Modo Hockey; Vancouver Goldeneyes
- Playing career: 2019–present

Darcie Lappan (born September 15, 2001) is a Canadian professional ice hockey player for the Vegas Vanguards of the Professional Women's Hockey League (PWHL). She previously played for Modo Hockey of the Swedish Women's Hockey League (SDHL) and the Vancouver Goldeneyes of the Professional Women's Hockey League (PWHL). She played college ice hockey at Colgate and Clarkson.

== Early life ==
Lappan was born to Bruce Lappan and Linda Asselstine-Lappan and has one sister, Sydney Asselstine. She attended Sydenham High School where she played badminton, lacrosse and track and field. She played ice hockey with the Kingston Jr. Ice Wolves and one with the Ottawa Lady Senators of the Provincial Women's Hockey League. She scored 33 goals and 55 assists in 101 career games.

== Playing career ==
=== College ===
On January 16, 2018, Lappan signed to play college ice hockey at Colgate. During the 2019–20 season, in her freshman year, she recorded nine goals and four assists in 34 games. During the 2020–21 season, in her sophomore year, she recorded five goals and one assist in 23 games, in a season that was shortened due to the COVID-19 pandemic. During the 2021–22 season, in her junior year, she recorded seven goals and five assists in 36 games.

Following her junior year, Lappan transferred to Clarkson. During the 2022–23 season, in her senior year, she recorded 13 goals and 27 assists in 42 games. During the 2023–24 season, as a graduate student, she recorded 13 goals and 19 assists in 40 games.

=== Professional ===
Following her collegiate career, Lappan joined Modo Hockey of the SDHL. During the 2024–25 season, she recorded ten goals and seven assists in 32 games during the regular season, and three assists in five playoff games.

In October 2025, she was invited to the Vancouver Goldeneyes' training camp. On November 20, 2025, she signed a reserve player contract with the Goldeneyes. She was immediately activated in place of defender Nina Jobst-Smith who began the season on the long-term injured reserve list.

On June 25, 2026, Lappan signed a 2-year Standard Player Agreement with the Vegas Vanguards.

== Career statistics ==
			Regular season					Playoffs
Season	Team	League	GP	G	A	Pts	PIM	GP	G	A	Pts	PIM
2019–20	Colgate University	ECAC	34	9	4	13	6	—	—	—	—	—
2020–21	Colgate University	ECAC	23	5	1	6	0	—	—	—	—	—
2021–22	Colgate University	ECAC	36	7	5	12	8	—	—	—	—	—
2022–23	Clarkson University	ECAC	42	13	27	40	6	—	—	—	—	—
2023–24	Clarkson University	ECAC	40	13	19	32	2	—	—	—	—	—
2024–25	Modo Hockey	SDHL	32	10	7	17	8	5	0	3	3	2
2025–26	Vancouver Goldeneyes	PWHL	12	0	1	1	0	—	—	—	—	—
SDHL totals			32	10	7	17	8	5	0	3	3	2
PWHL totals			12	0	1	1	0	—	—	—	—	—
