= Alison Izzi =

American ice hockey administrator

- Born: Rhode Island, United States
- Education: Doctor of Law, Western New England University School of Law, 2025
- Occupation: General manager
- Employer: Vancouver Goldeneyes

Alison Izzi is an attorney and the general manager of the Vancouver Goldeneyes, a member of the Professional Women's Hockey League (PWHL). Izzi was named to this position in September 2026.

== Career ==
Izzi first worked in professional hockey in the communications and social media department of the American Hockey League, starting in 2017. From 2018 to 2024, she worked as the league's Director of Hockey Administration. For the 2024–2025 season, she served as the AHL's President of Hockey Operations/Governance. In September 2025, she took on a role as a legal clerk for the National Hockey League.

== Education ==
She is a graduate of Western New England University School of Law, graduating with a Doctorate in Law.
