= Novosinkovo =

Rural locality in Dmitrovsky District, Moscow Oblast, Russia

Coordinates: 56°22′34″N 37°19′42″E

Novosinkovo (Russian: Новосинько́во) is a rural locality (a settlement) in Dmitrovsky District of Moscow Oblast, Russia. Population: 8,073 (2010 Census); 6,438 (2002 Census).

Novosinkovo used to be an agricultural center with many kolkhozes surrounding it and a technical college of agriculture.

In the settlement there is a statue of Vladimir Lenin and an alley of trees with various statues, but the settlement has fallen into disarray after the breakup of the Soviet Union. Numerous shops have sprung up; the infrastructure and houses have deteriorated, and the whole place has degraded.
