= Brooke McQuigge =

Canadian ice hockey player (born 2000)

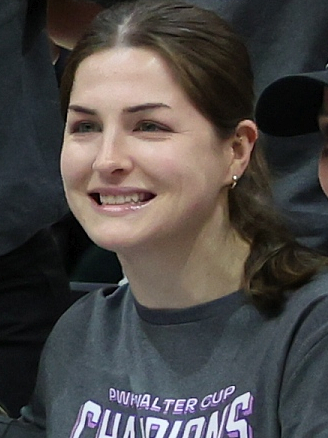
- McQuigge in 2025
- Born: June 9, 2000 (age 26) Bowmanville, Ontario, Canada
- Height: 5 ft 8 in (173 cm)
- Position: Forward
- Shoots: Left
- PWHL team Former teams: Ottawa Charge; Modo Hockey; Minnesota Frost; Vancouver Goldeneyes
- Playing career: 2019–present

Brooke McQuigge (born June 9, 2000) is a Canadian professional ice hockey player who is a forward for the Ottawa Charge of the Professional Women's Hockey League (PWHL). She previously played for Modo Hockey of the Swedish Women's Hockey League (SDHL), and the Minnesota Frost and Vancouver Goldeneyes of the PWHL. She played college ice hockey at Clarkson.

== Playing career ==
=== College ===
McQuigge began her collegiate career at Clarkson during the 2019–20 season. During her freshman year, she recorded eight goals and nine assist in 37 games. During the 2020–21 season in her sophomore year, she recorded seven goals and 11 assists in a season that was shortened due to the COVID-19 pandemic. During the 2021–22 season in her junior year, she recorded 16 goals and 13 assists in 37 games. During the 2022–23 season in her senior year, she recorded nine goals and five assists in 29 games. During the 2023–24 season, as a graduate student, she recorded 13 goals and 20 assists in 40 games.

=== Professional ===
On May 24, 2024, McQuigge signed with Modo Hockey of the SDHL. On June 10, 2024, she was drafted in the fourth round, 21st overall, by PWHL Minnesota in the 2024 PWHL Draft. She began the 2024–25 season with Modo, where she recorded four assists in 14 games. On November 27, 2024, she left Modo and joined the Minnesota Frost.

On June 9, 2025, McQuigge was drafted fourth overall by the Vancouver Goldeneyes in the 2025 PWHL Expansion Draft. On July 11, 2025, she signed a one-year contract with Vancouver.

On January 18, 2026, McQuigge was traded to the Ottawa Charge, along with Michela Cava and Emma Greco, in exchange for Mannon McMahon, Anna Meixner, and Anna Shokhina.

== International play ==
Medal record

Representing Canada

Ice hockey

World U18 Championships
Silver medal – second place	2017 Czech Republic	
Bronze medal – third place	2018 Russia	

McQuigge represented Canada at the IIHF World Women's U18 Championship and won a silver medal in 2017 and a bronze medal in 2018.

== Personal life ==
McQuigge was born to Liz and Trevor McQuigge. She has two sisters, Rachel, and Kirstyn, and a brother, Daniel; Kirstyn played college ice hockey at Clarkson alongside Brooke.

== Career statistics ==
=== Regular season and playoffs ===
Note: GP = Games played; G = Goals; A = Assists; Pts = Points; PIM = Penalty minutes;

			Regular season					Playoffs
Season	Team	League	GP	G	A	Pts	PIM	GP	G	A	Pts	PIM
2019–20	Clarkson University	ECAC	37	8	9	17	32	—	—	—	—	—
2020–21	Clarkson University	ECAC	19	7	11	18	20	—	—	—	—	—
2021–22	Clarkson University	ECAC	37	16	13	29	34	—	—	—	—	—
2022–23	Clarkson University	ECAC	29	9	5	14	37	—	—	—	—	—
2023–24	Clarkson University	ECAC	40	13	20	33	50	—	—	—	—	—
2024–25	MoDo Hockey	SDHL	14	0	4	4	6	—	—	—	—	—
2024–25	Minnesota Frost	PWHL	29	8	7	15	25	8	2	1	3	2
2025–26	Vancouver Goldeneyes	PWHL	13	0	1	1	6	—	—	—	—	—
2025–26	Ottawa Charge	PWHL	17	0	1	1	4	8	0	0	0	0
SDHL totals			14	0	4	4	6	—	—	—	—	—
PWHL totals			59	8	9	17	35	16	2	1	3	2

=== International ===
Year	Team	Event	Result	GP	G	A	Pts	PIM
2017	Canada	U18	2nd place, silver medalist(s)	5	0	0	0	2
2018	Canada	U18	3rd place, bronze medalist(s)	6	0	0	0	4
Junior totals				11	0	0	0	6

== Awards and honours ==
Honors	Year
PWHL
Walter Cup Champion	2025
