= Michela Cava =

Canadian ice hockey player (born 1994)

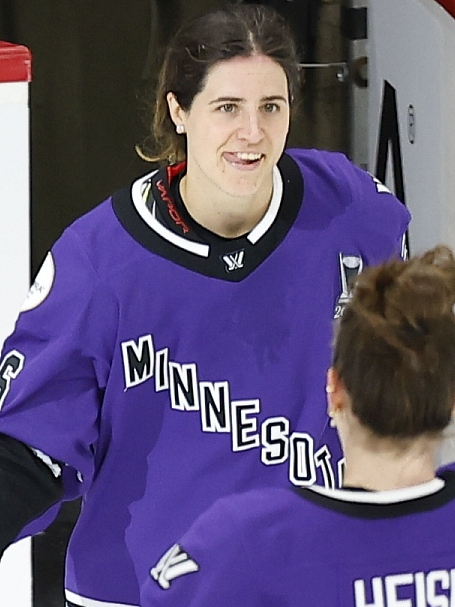
- Cava with PWHL Minnesota in 2024
- Born: March 26, 1994 (age 32) Thunder Bay, Ontario, Canada
- Height: 5 ft 4 in (163 cm)
- Weight: 134 lb (61 kg; 9 st 8 lb)
- Position: Centre
- Shoots: Right
- PWHL team Former teams: Ottawa Charge: Vancouver Goldeneyes; Minnesota Frost; Toronto Six; KRS Vanke Rays; Luleå HF/MSSK; Brynäs IF; Modo Hockey; Toronto Furies
- Playing career: 2012–present

Michela Marie Cava (born March 26, 1994) is a Canadian ice hockey centre for the Ottawa Charge of the Professional Women's Hockey League (PWHL).

== Playing career ==
Along with goaltender Danika Ranger, Cava is one of only two players to have won a gold medal at the Esso Cup, Canada’s National Female Midget Championship and the U18 Canadian women’s nationals. Cava was the first, winning the Esso Cup with the Thunder Bay Queens in 2010 and with Team Ontario Red at the 2011 nationals.

=== College ===
Cava played college ice hockey her first two seasons with the University of Connecticut Huskies. Prior to her junior season, she transferred to the University of Minnesota Duluth to join the Minnesota Duluth Bulldogs women's ice hockey program. In her final NCAA season, she recorded 38 points in 37 contests, including 12 multi-point games.

=== Professional ===
Cava was selected by the Toronto Furies in the third round of the 2016 CWHL Draft. She made her debut on October 14 against the Boston Blades. Cava recorded a five-game scoring streak, starting on October 30 and lasting until November 20. She was selected to compete in the 2017 CWHL All-Star Game.

After just one year in Toronto, Cava left the league to move to Sweden, signing with Modo Hockey in the SDHL. She would score 55 points in 36 games in her first season in Sweden, leading Modo in points and finishing 5th in the league in scoring. The next year, she would score 64 points, finishing the season as the SDHL's leading scorer.

In 2019, Cava left Modo to sign with Brynäs in Gävle, seeking a new challenge and wanting to move to a bigger city. She would score 45 points in 36 games for Brynäs, finishing fourth in club scoring, as the club advanced to the SDHL semi-finals for the first time in seven years. She would sign with Luleå ahead of the 2020–21 SDHL season.

On October 6, 2021, Cava signed with the Toronto Six of the Premier Hockey Federation. She would be named the Playoff MVP for the 2022–23 season, leading the Six to win the Isobel Cup.

Cava was drafted in the 12th round of the 2023 PWHL Draft by PWHL Minnesota. During the 2023–24 season, she recorded five goals and three assists in 24 regular season games. During the playoffs she tied Taylor Heise for the team lead in scoring with four goals and four assists in ten games, and helped Minnesota win the inaugural Walter Cup. On June 21, 2024, Cava signed a one-year contract extension with the Frost. During the 2024–25 season, she recorded nine goals and ten assists in 30 regular season games. During the 2025 PWHL playoffs, she recorded three goals and two assists in eight games to help the Frost win their second consecutive Walter Cup. On June 17, 2025, she signed a two-year contract with the Vancouver Goldeneyes.

On January 18, 2026, Cava was traded to the Ottawa Charge, along with Emma Greco and Brooke McQuigge, in exchange for Mannon McMahon, Anna Meixner, and Anna Shokhina.

== Personal life ==
Cava has been in a relationship with her Ottawa Charge teammate Emma Greco since October 2022. The two were also teammates on the Vancouver Goldeneyes, PWHL Minnesota, and the Toronto Six. They got engaged on September 9, 2026.

== Career statistics ==
Note: GP = Games played; G = Goals; A = Assists; Pts = Points; PIM = Penalty minutes;

			Regular season					Playoffs
Season	Team	League	GP	G	A	Pts	PIM	GP	G	A	Pts	PIM
2012–13	UConn Huskies	HEA	34	10	7	17	16	—	—	—	—	—
2013–14	UConn Huskies	HEA	35	10	17	27	14	—	—	—	—	—
2014–15	Minnesota Duluth Bulldogs	WCHA	32	3	3	6	8	—	—	—	—	—
2015–16	Minnesota Duluth Bulldogs	WCHA	37	19	19	38	10	—	—	—	—	—
2016–17	Toronto Furies	CWHL	24	6	8	14	10	—	—	—	—	—
2017–18	MoDo Hockey	SDHL	36	25	30	55	26	5	1	2	3	2
2018–19	MoDo Hockey	SDHL	36	27	37	64	30	6	6	5	11	4
2019–20	Brynäs IF	SDHL	36	23	22	45	26	5	4	2	6	6
2020–21	Luleå HF	SDHL	36	29	37	66	22	9	5	5	10	4
2020–21	KRS Vanke Rays	ZhHL	—	—	—	—	—	3	0	3	3	0
2021–22	Toronto Six	PHF	11	4	3	7	6	1	0	0	0	0
2021–22	KRS Vanke Rays	ZhHL	12	3	13	16	4	8	6	11	17	8
2022–23	Toronto Six	PHF	24	9	12	21	8	4	3	3	6	0
2023–24	PWHL Minnesota	PWHL	24	5	3	8	4	10	4	4	8	4
2024–25	Minnesota Frost	PWHL	30	9	10	19	10	8	3	2	5	4
2025–26	Vancouver Goldeneyes	PWHL	13	1	4	5	4	—	—	—	—	—
2025–26	Ottawa Charge	PWHL	17	0	4	4	4	8	1	2	3	0
CWHL totals			24	6	8	14	10	—	—	—	—	—
SDHL totals			144	104	126	230	104	25	16	14	30	10
ZhHL totals			12	3	13	16	4	11	6	14	20	8
PHF totals			35	13	15	28	14	5	3	3	6	0
PWHL totals			84	15	21	36	24	26	8	8	16	8

== Awards and honours ==
- 2012 Esso Cup MVP
- CWHL First Star of the Game (October 16, 2016)
- CWHL Second Star of the Game (October 30, 2016)
- SDHL Top Point Scorer, 2018–19 season
- SDHL Champion, 2020–21 (Luleå HF/MSSK)
- ZhHL Champion, 2021–22 (KRS Vanke Rays)
- PHF Playoff MVP, 2022–23 (Toronto Six)
- PHF Isobel Cup Champion, 2022–23 (Toronto Six)
- PWHL Walter Cup Champion, 2023–24, 2024–25 (Minnesota)
