= Cara Gardner Morey =

Canadian ice hockey player and coach (born 1978)

- Born: July 31, 1978 (age 48)
- Played for: Montreal Wingstar; Brampton Thunder
- Coached for: Princeton; Robert Morris; Phoenix Lady Coyotes
- National team: Canada

Cara Morey (née Gardner; born July 31, 1978) is a Canadian ice hockey coach and former player, who is the head coach of the Vancouver Goldeneyes of the Professional Women's Hockey League. From 2017 to 2025, she served as the head coach of Princeton University's women's team, the Tigers.

She was an assistant coach of the Canada women's national under-18 team for the 2016–17 season. Before the appointment, she won gold as an assistant coach with Canada's national women's development team at the 2015 Nations Cup.

== Playing career ==
Raised in Hensall, Ontario, Morey was a gold medalist with Canada's Under-22 team at the 2000 Nations Cup, contested in Füssen, Germany. As a player for the Brown Bears women's ice hockey and field hockey programs, Morey won the Ivy League Rookie of the Year Award for field hockey in 1999. As a field hockey competitor, she led the team in both goals (15) and points (38) during the 2000 season. In addition, she earned Second Team Regional All-American recognition for her efforts in the 2000 season. As of 2015, Morey ranked fifth all-time in goals (27) and sixth overall in points (66) among Brown Bears field hockey competitors.

In her final ice hockey season with the Brown Bears, she registered 12 points (six goals, six assists) in 28 games played, including three power-play goals and one game-winning goal. During her time as a member of the ice hockey team, the Bears qualified for three AWCHA National Championship Tournaments.

Upon graduation, she played two seasons in the original NWHL, spending her first season with the Montreal Wingstar and her second season with the Brampton Thunder.

Her playing career was disrupted in 2003 due to a snowmobiling accident, in which she broke a femur.

== Coaching career ==
While her husband, Sean Morey, played for the Pittsburgh Steelers, she was a coach at Robert Morris University in Moon Township, Pennsylvania. She also spent time as a coach with the Phoenix Lady Coyotes U-19 AAA team, when her husband joined the Arizona Cardinals later in his career.

In 2011, Morey became the associate head coach of the women's hockey team at Princeton University, alongside head coach Jeff Kampersal. She was crucial to Princeton's run to the 2016 Ivy League championship and an at-large berth in the NCAA tournament. In the summer of 2017, Morey was appointed head coach of the team when Kampersal left to be head coach at Pennsylvania State University. During her tenure, she helped lead the Tigers to the ECAC quarterfinals five times as well as the ECAC semifinals when Princeton went 20-10-3. As of 2017, Princeton had nine All-ECAC and 18 All-Ivy League selections during her years with the team. She helped Kelsey Koelzer earn first-team All-America honours in 2016 and recruited and developed goalie Steph Neatby, the 2017 USCHO Division I Rookie of the Year.

Morey participated in Hockey Canada's female coach development initiative to promote world-class performance and leadership skills.

Morey has coached players at the Philadelphia Flyers development camp from 2021-2025.

On May 23, 2025, the Vancouver Goldeneyes announced that Morey would be appointed as the club's first general manager.

On July 30, 2026, the Vancouver Goldeneyes announced that Morey would move to the club's head coach position and would be leaving the general manager position.

== Awards and honours ==
- 1999 Ivy League Rookie of the Year Award (Field Hockey)
- 2001 Ivy League First All-Star Team (Ice Hockey)
- 2001 ECAC Second All-Star Team in 2000-01 (Ice Hockey)
- 2001: Brown Bears best defensive player award
- 2001: Ivy League All-Academic Team

== Personal ==
Morey graduated from Brown University in 2001.

Her husband Sean Morey was a member of the Pittsburgh Steelers roster that won Super Bowl XL. Together, they have three daughters: Devan, Kathryn, and Shea.
