= Anna Meixner =

Austrian ice hockey player (born 1994)

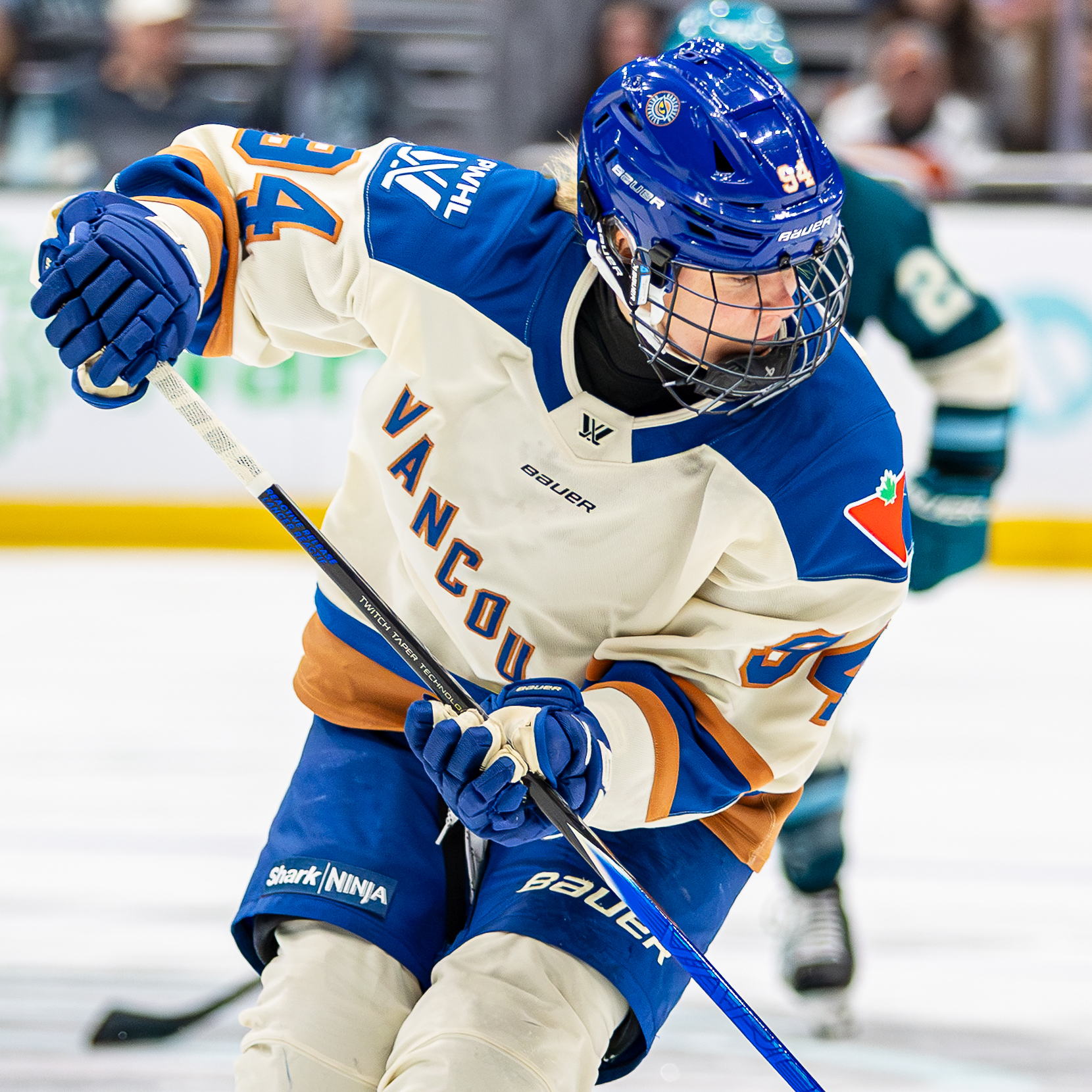
- Meixner with the Vancouver Goldeneyes in 2026
- Born: June 16, 1994 (age 32) Zell am See, Austria
- Height: 161 cm (5 ft 3 in)
- Weight: 64 kg (141 lb; 10 st 1 lb)
- Position: Forward
- Shoots: Left
- PWHL team Former teams: Vancouver Goldeneyes: EHV Sabres Vienna; HV71; DEC Salzburg Eagles; Brynäs IF; Ottawa Charge
- National team: Austria
- Playing career: 2008–present

Anna Meixner (born June 16, 1994) is an Austrian ice hockey forward for the Vancouver Goldeneyes of the Professional Women's Hockey League (PWHL) and the Austrian national team. She previously played for the Ottawa Charge of the PWHL. A four-time European Women's Hockey League (EWHL) champion, she is the second-highest all-time scorer in EHV Sabres Vienna history and the fourth-highest scorer all-time for Austria.

== Playing career ==
Meixner grew up playing on boys' teams of EK Zeller Eisbären (EKZ) in her hometown of Zell am See. When she turned 16, Austrian Ice Hockey Association regulations prevented her from playing on a boys' team any longer and, because EKZ did not have any teams for women or girls, she moved to Salzburg to play with DEC Salzburg in the Austrian Women's Ice Hockey Bundesliga (DEBL; German: Dameneishockey-Bundesliga). She then moved to Vienna at age 17 to play for the women's team EHV Sabres Vienna in the European Women's Hockey League.

At the age of 22, she left Austria to sign with HV71 in the Swedish Women's Hockey League (SDHL). She scored sixteen points in seventeen games of the 2016–17 SDHL season, as the club made it to the SDHL playoff finals.

Following the season with HV71, Meixner returned to the EHV Sabres.

In May 2020, she announced her return to Sweden to play for Brynäs IF. She had a strong start to the 2020–21 SDHL season, scoring six goals in the first five games, as Brynäs became the last remaining undefeated team in the league, and winning the first Goal of the Week award for the season.

On June 10, 2024, she was drafted in the sixth round, 32nd overall, by PWHL Ottawa in the 2024 PWHL draft. On June 27, 2024, she signed a one-year contract with the Ottawa Charge. During the 2024–25 season, she recorded one goal and one assist in 28 games. On July 10, 2025, she signed a one-year contract extension with the Charge.

On 18 January 2026, Meixner was traded to the Vancouver Goldeneyes, along with Mannon McMahon and Anna Shokhina, in exchange for Michela Cava, Emma Greco, and Brooke McQuigge.

== International play ==
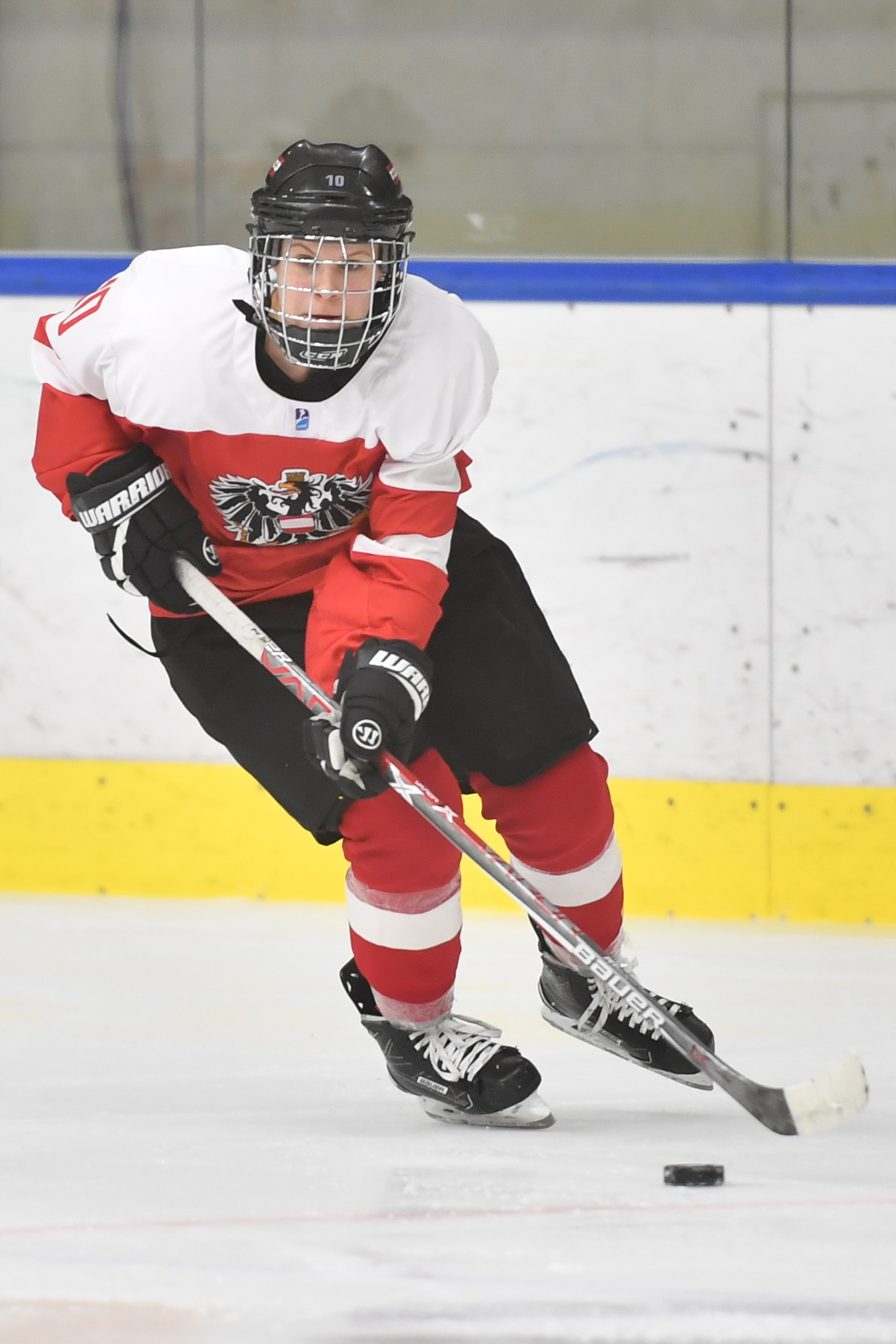
Meixner at the 2017 World Championships.

Meixner took part in the 2012 Winter Youth Olympics and won a silver medal with Austria in the women's ice hockey tournament.

== Career statistics ==
			Regular Season					Playoffs
Season	Team	League	GP	G	A	Pts	PIM	GP	G	A	Pts	PIM
2008-09	SPG Kitzbühel/Salzburg	DEBL	2	2	0	2	0	–	–	–	–	–
2009–10	EC The Ravens Salzburg	Austria	2	0	0	0	0	–	–	–	–	–
2010–11	EHV Sabres Wien	Austria	2	1	3	4	0	–	–	–	–	–
2011–12	EHV Sabres Wien	EHWL	15	6	7	13	8	2	3	0	3	0
2012–13	EHV Sabres Wien	EWHL	16	22	8	30	10	4	4	1	5	4
2013–14	EHV Sabres Wien	EWHL	17	36	31	67	10	2	0	1	1	0
2014–15	EHV Sabres Wien	EWHL	19	40	18	58	12	4	14	19	33	2
2015–16	EHV Sabres Wien	EWHL	17	20	24	44	10	–	–	–	–	–
2016–17	HV71	SDHL	17	10	6	16	0	6	2	2	4	2
2017–18	EHV Sabres Wien	EWHL	16	22	14	36	6	5	3	4	7	6
2018–19	EHV Sabres Wien	EWHL	13	24	17	41	10	4	4	0	4	0
2019–20	EHV Sabres Wien	EWHL	9	12	8	20	4	–	–	–	–	–
2020–21	Brynäs IF	SDHL	35	23	9	32	14	8	2	3	5	2
2021–22	Brynäs IF	SDHL	24	10	12	22	12	10	5	5	10	6
2022–23	Brynäs IF	SDHL	30	26	27	53	12	8	6	5	11	6
2023–24	Brynäs IF	SDHL	22	11	13	24	4	18	–	–	–	–	–
2024–25	Ottawa Charge	PWHL	28	1	1	2	6	8	0	2	2	0
2025–26	Ottawa Charge	PWHL	13	2	0	2	6	–	–	–	–	–
2025–26	Vancouver Goldeneyes	PWHL	17	1	3	4	0	–	–	–	–	–
PWHL totals			58	4	4	8	12	8	0	2	2	0
