= Modo Hockey (women) =

SDHL ice hockey club in Örnsköldsvik, Sweden

- City: Örnsköldsvik, Sweden
- League: SDHL
- Founded: 1969
- Home arena: Hägglunds Arena
- Colors: Red, white, green
- Owner: MoDo Hockey
- General manager: Björn Edlund
- Head coach: Jared Cipparone
- Captain: Ebba Berglund
- Website: Official website

Championships
- Regular season titles: 2 (2013, 2014)
- Playoff championships: 1 (2012)

Modo Hockey (or MoDo Hockey in uppercase letters) is an ice hockey club in the Swedish Women's Hockey League (SDHL), the top flight of women's hockey in Sweden. They play in Örnsköldsvik, in the historical province of Ångermanland on the east coast of Sweden, at the Hägglunds Arena. The club's farm team, Modo Hockey 2, plays in the North division of the Nationella Damhockeyligan (NDHL).

== History ==
The women's section of Modo Hockey was formed in 1968 under the name of Modo AIK, playing the first ever organised women's hockey match in Sweden against Timrå IK in 1969. As there was no organised league, the match was only a training match. The club finished in third place in the first official Swedish Championship, held in the 1987–88 season, and finished in second place a year later. The club would go on to become on the best in Sweden in the early 2000s, finishing in the playoff top-three for three consecutive years between 2000 and 2003, and eight years in a row between 2004 and 2012. The 2012 Riksserien season would also mark Modo's first-ever playoffs championship win.

In recent years, the club has suffered problems retaining top players, losing all-time top scorer Erika Grahm to Brynäs IF and American Olympian Sidney Morin to Linköping HC prior to the 2018, as well as defenceman Gracen Hirschy to Linköping HC in 2020. After the club finished in second place in the 2018–19 regular season and were eliminated in the playoff semi-finals by Linköping, the club's two top scorers as well as long-time defender Johanna Olofsson left. The club would then finish in 9th in the 2019–20 season, the first time that the club ever had to participate in the relegation playoffs. The club was able to defend their place in the SDHL after beating Skellefteå AIK 7–0 across two matches.

== Season-by-season results ==
This is a partial list of the most recent seasons completed by MoDo Hockey.

Code explanation: GP—Games played; W—Wins (3 points); OTW—Overtime wins (2 points); OTL—Overtime losses (1 point); L—Losses; GF—Goals for; GA—Goals against; Pts—Points; Top Scorer: Points (Goals+Assists)

Season	League	Regular season										Post season results
Season	League	Finish	GP	W	OTW	OTL	L	GF	GA	Pts	Top scorer	Post season results
2015–16	Riksserien	8th	36	10	1	5	20	63	88	37	(Sweden) E. Grahm 22 (11+11)	Lost quarterfinals against AIK IF
2016–17	SDHL	8th	36	11	2	6	17	75	87	43	(Sweden) E. Grahm 40 (19+21)	Lost quarterfinals against HV71
2017–18	SDHL	3rd	36	24	5	3	4	142	58	85	(Canada) M. Cava 55 (25+30)	Lost semifinals against Linköping HC
2018–19	SDHL	2nd	36	23	4	2	7	137	88	79	(Canada) M. Cava 64 (27+37)	Lost semi-finals against Linköping HC
2019–20	SDHL	9th	36	7	3	3	23	66	116	30	(France) M. Allemoz 21 (10+11)	Saved in relegation playoffs, 2–0 (Skellefteå AIK)
2020–21	SDHL	6th	36	15	3	1	17	88	88	52	(Sweden) L. Ljungblom 30 (14+16)	Lost quarterfinals against HV71
2021–22	SDHL	5th	36	17	7	1	11	113	85	66	(Sweden) L. Ljungblom 32 (20+12)	Lost quarterfinals against HV71
2022–23	SDHL	4th	32	15	4	3	10	91	74	56	(Canada) J. Wakefield 37 (23+14)	Lost semifinals against Luleå HF/MSSK
2023–24	SDHL	2nd	36	20	5	3	8	119	68	73	(Sweden) L. Ljungblom 46 (23+23)	Lost finals against Luleå HF/MSSK

== Players and personnel ==
=== 2024–25 roster ===
As of 26 December 2024

No.	Nat	Player	Pos	S/G	Age	Acquired	Birthplace
28	(Sweden)	Ella Albinsson	F	R	23	2024	Karlstad, Värmland, Sweden
15	(Sweden)	Linnéa Andersson (A)	D	R	27	2022	Eksjö, Småland, Sweden
19	(Canada)	Lauren Bellefontaine	F	R	26	2023	Kemptville, Ontario, Canada
12	(Sweden)	Ebba Berglund (C)	D	L	28	2023	Örnsköldsvik, Ångermanland, Sweden
20	(Switzerland)	Andrea Brändli	G	L	29	2023	Zürich, Zürich, Switzerland
32	(Sweden)	Mariam El-Mahmadi (A)	D	L	28	2020	Söderhamn, Hälsingland, Sweden
14	(Sweden)	Lovisa Engström	C	L	19	2023	Surahammar, Västmanland, Sweden
25	(Sweden)	Maja Grundström (A)	C/RW	L	24	2018	Örnsköldsvik, Ångermanland, Sweden
2	(United States)	Alexa Gruschow	F	R	32	2024	Mechanicsburg, Pennsylvania, United States
27	(Canada)	Alexie Guay	D	L	25	2024	Magog, Quebec, Canada
13	(Sweden)	Mira Hallin	LW	R	20	2021	Själevad, Ångermanland, Sweden
5	(Sweden)	Sanna Halsius	D	R	20	2024	Själevad, Ångermanland, Sweden
24	(Sweden)	Ebba Hedqvist	F	L	19	2021	Själevad, Ångermanland, Sweden
11	(Sweden)	Moa Johannesson	C	L	19	2024	Ljungby, Småland, Sweden
22	(Canada)	Darcie Lappan	F	L	24	2024	Kingston, Ontario, Canada
26	(Canada)	Brooke McQuigge	F	L	26	2024	Bowmanville, Ontario, Canada
30	(Sweden)	Lovisa Persson	G	L	20	2023	
34	(Czech Republic)	Vendula Přibylová	F	L	30	2022	Olomouc, Olomoucký kraj, Czechia
14	(United States)	Emma Seitz	D	L	26	2023	New York, New York, United States
10	(Sweden)	Wilma Sundin	F	L	22	2019	Sundsvall, Medelpad, Sweden
17	(Czech Republic)	Adéla Šapovalivová	F	L	20	2023	Prague, Czechia
	(United States)	Alexandra Weiss	D	L	25	2024	Plover, Wisconsin, United States
18	(Sweden)	Elsa Åberg	D	L	19	2023	Danderyd, Uppland, Sweden

Coaching staff and team personnel

- Head coach: Jared Cipparone
- Assistant coach: Alexander Naskov
- Goaltending coach: Magnus Helin
- Conditioning coach: Tobias Nordin
- Equipment manager: Fredric Larsson

=== Team captaincy history ===
- Frida Nevalainen, 2007–08
- Annie Svedin, 2008–09
- Erika Grahm, 2009–2018
- Olivia Carlsson, 2018–2023
- Ebba Berglund, 2023–

=== Head coaches ===
- Sture Andersson, 2003–2009
- Robert Elfving, 2009–10
- Jens Öhman, 2010–11
- Mikael Nilsson, 2011–2016
- Jens Öhman, 2016–17
- Björn Edlund, 2017–2022
- Jared Cipparone, 2022–

== Franchise records and leaders ==
=== All-time scoring leaders ===
The top-ten point-scorers (goals + assists) of Modo Hockey, through the completion of the 2023–24 season. Note: Nat = Nationality; Pos = Position; GP = Games played; G = Goals; A = Assists; Pts = Points; P/G = Points per game

Points
Nat	Player	Pos	GP	G	A	Pts	P/G
(Sweden)	Erika Grahm	LW/C	288	150	152	302	1.05
(Sweden)	Olivia Carlsson	W	377	66	121	187	0.50
(Sweden)	Tina Enström	C	135	51	100	151	1.12
(Sweden)	Emma Nordin	C	176	63	83	146	0.83
(Sweden)	Lina Ljungblom	C	131	74	64	138	1.05
(Sweden)	Johanna Olofsson	D	324	43	91	134	0.41
(Canada)	Michela Cava	C	72	52	67	119	1.65
(Canada)	Kaitlyn Tougas	RW	104	42	68	110	1.06
(Sweden)	Therése Sjölander	F	85	51	57	108	1.27
(Sweden)	Marion Allemoz	LW	133	46	41	87	0.65
