= Ashton Bell =

Canadian ice hockey player (born 1999)

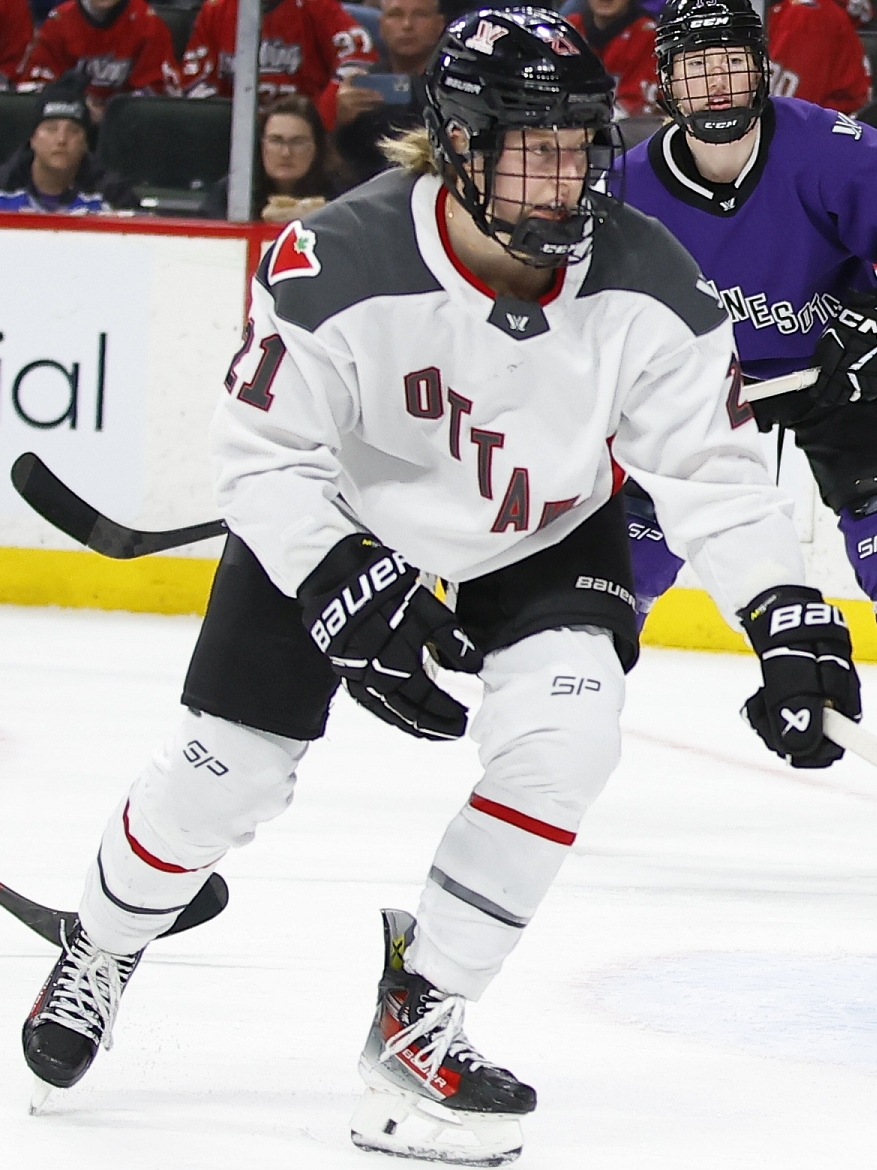
- Bell with PWHL Ottawa in 2024
- Born: December 7, 1999 (age 26) Deloraine, Manitoba, Canada
- Height: 175 cm (5 ft 9 in)
- Position: Defence/Forward
- Shoots: Right
- PWHL team Former teams: Vancouver Goldeneyes; Ottawa Charge
- National team: Canada
- Playing career: 2017–present
Medal record
Women's ice hockey
Representing Canada
Olympic Games
| Gold medal – first place | 2022 Beijing | Team |
World Championships
| Gold medal – first place | 2021 Canada |
| Gold medal – first place | 2022 Denmark |
| Gold medal – first place | 2024 United States |
World U18 Championships
| Silver medal – second place | 2016 Canada |
| Silver medal – second place | 2017 Czech Republic |

Ashton Julia Bell (born December 7, 1999) is a Canadian professional ice hockey player and captain for the Vancouver Goldeneyes of the Professional Women's Hockey League (PWHL). She previously played for the Ottawa Charge of the PWHL. She played college ice hockey at Minnesota Duluth.

== Early life ==
During high school, she played for the Western Wildcats of the Manitoba AAA Female Midget Hockey League, twice winning the league's Most Valuable Player Award.

== Playing career ==
=== College ===
In 2017, she began attending the University of Minnesota Duluth, playing for the university's women's ice hockey programme. She had originally committed to the University of North Dakota but was forced to change plans after UND eliminated its women's hockey programme. She scored 23 points in 35 games in her rookie NCAA year, good for second on her team in scoring. She was moved from forward to defence ahead of the 2019–20 season. She posted a career-high 32 points in 36 games that year, leading all Western Collegiate Hockey Association defenders in scoring and being named to the All-WCHA First Team. She was then named team captain for the 2020–21 season. She was named Western Collegiate Hockey Association Player of the Month in November 2020.

=== Professional ===
Bell began her professional career when she was selected by PWHL Ottawa in the second round, eighth overall, in the 2023 PWHL Draft. As one of the league's inaugural players, she quickly established herself as a reliable two-way defender, contributing in all situations and emerging as a key part of Ottawa's blue line. During her two seasons with the club, Bell developed a reputation for her strong skating, defensive awareness, and leadership qualities, helping Ottawa remain competitive during the PWHL's formative years.

On June 9, 2025, Bell was selected first overall by the Vancouver Goldeneyes in the 2025 PWHL Expansion Draft, making her the first player in franchise history. Vancouver viewed Bell as a cornerstone piece around whom to build its inaugural roster, citing her experience, versatility, and leadership. On August 14, 2025, she signed a two-year contract extension with the club through the 2027–28 season, solidifying her role as one of the organization's foundational players. Later that year, on November 21, 2025, Bell was named the first captain in Goldeneyes history, becoming the face of the expansion franchise as it entered its inaugural season.

== International play ==
Bell represented Canada at the 2016 and 2017 IIHF World Women's U18 Championship, scoring a total of eight points in ten games and winning silver twice.

In 2017, she served as the Canadian team captain. She was one of 28 players invited to Hockey Canada's Centralization Camp, which represents the selection process for the Canadian women's team that shall compete in Ice hockey at the 2022 Winter Olympics.

On January 11, 2022, Bell was named to Canada's 2022 Olympic team.

== Personal life ==
Bell studied biology at the University of Minnesota-Duluth. She previously graduated from Deloraine High School in Manitoba, competing in the Manitoba High School Rodeo Association alongside her hockey play.

Bell is a member of the LGBTQ+ community and is in a relationship with former University of Minnesota-Duluth teammate Nina Jobst-Smith, who was drafted by the Vancouver Goldeneyes in the 2025 PWHL Draft.

== Career statistics ==
=== Regular season and playoffs ===
| | | | Regular season | | | | | Playoffs |
| Season | Team | League | GP | G | A | Pts | PIM | GP | G | A | Pts | PIM |
|---|---|---|---|---|---|---|---|---|---|---|---|---|
| 2017–18 | University of Minnesota-Duluth | WCHA | 35 | 11 | 12 | 23 | 6 | — | — | — | — | — |
| 2018–19 | University of Minnesota-Duluth | WCHA | 35 | 5 | 12 | 17 | 25 | — | — | — | — | — |
| 2019–20 | University of Minnesota-Duluth | WCHA | 36 | 11 | 21 | 32 | 10 | — | — | — | — | — |
| 2020–21 | University of Minnesota-Duluth | WCHA | 19 | 4 | 10 | 14 | 4 | — | — | — | — | — |
| 2022–23 | University of Minnesota-Duluth | WCHA | 39 | 12 | 21 | 33 | 10 | — | — | — | — | — |
| 2023–24 | PWHL Ottawa | PWHL | 24 | 2 | 5 | 7 | 2 | — | — | — | — | — |
| 2024–25 | Ottawa Charge | PWHL | 27 | 3 | 3 | 6 | 0 | 8 | 1 | 1 | 2 | 0 |
| 2025–26 | Vancouver Goldeneyes | PWHL | 30 | 2 | 4 | 6 | 0 | — | — | — | — | — |
| PWHL totals | | | 81 | 7 | 12 | 19 | 2 | 8 | 1 | 1 | 2 | 0 |

=== International ===
| Year | Team | Event | Result | GP | G | A | Pts | PIM |
|---|---|---|---|---|---|---|---|---|
| 2016 | Canada | U18 | 2nd place, silver medalist(s) | 5 | 3 | 3 | 6 | 0 |
| 2017 | Canada | U18 | 2nd place, silver medalist(s) | 5 | 2 | 0 | 2 | 0 |
| 2021 | Canada | WC | 1st place, gold medalist(s) | 7 | 1 | 2 | 3 | 0 |
| 2022 | Canada | OG | 1st place, gold medalist(s) | 7 | 1 | 4 | 5 | 0 |
| 2022 | Canada | WC | 1st place, gold medalist(s) | 7 | 0 | 0 | 0 | 0 |
| 2024 | Canada | WC | 1st place, gold medalist(s) | 7 | 0 | 1 | 1 | 0 |
| Junior totals | | | | 10 | 5 | 3 | 8 | 0 |
| Senior Totals | | | | 28 | 2 | 7 | 9 | 0 |

== Awards and honours ==
| Award | Year | Ref |
PWHL
| PWHL All-Rookie Team | 2024 | |
