= Claire Thompson (ice hockey) =

Canadian ice hockey player (born 1998)

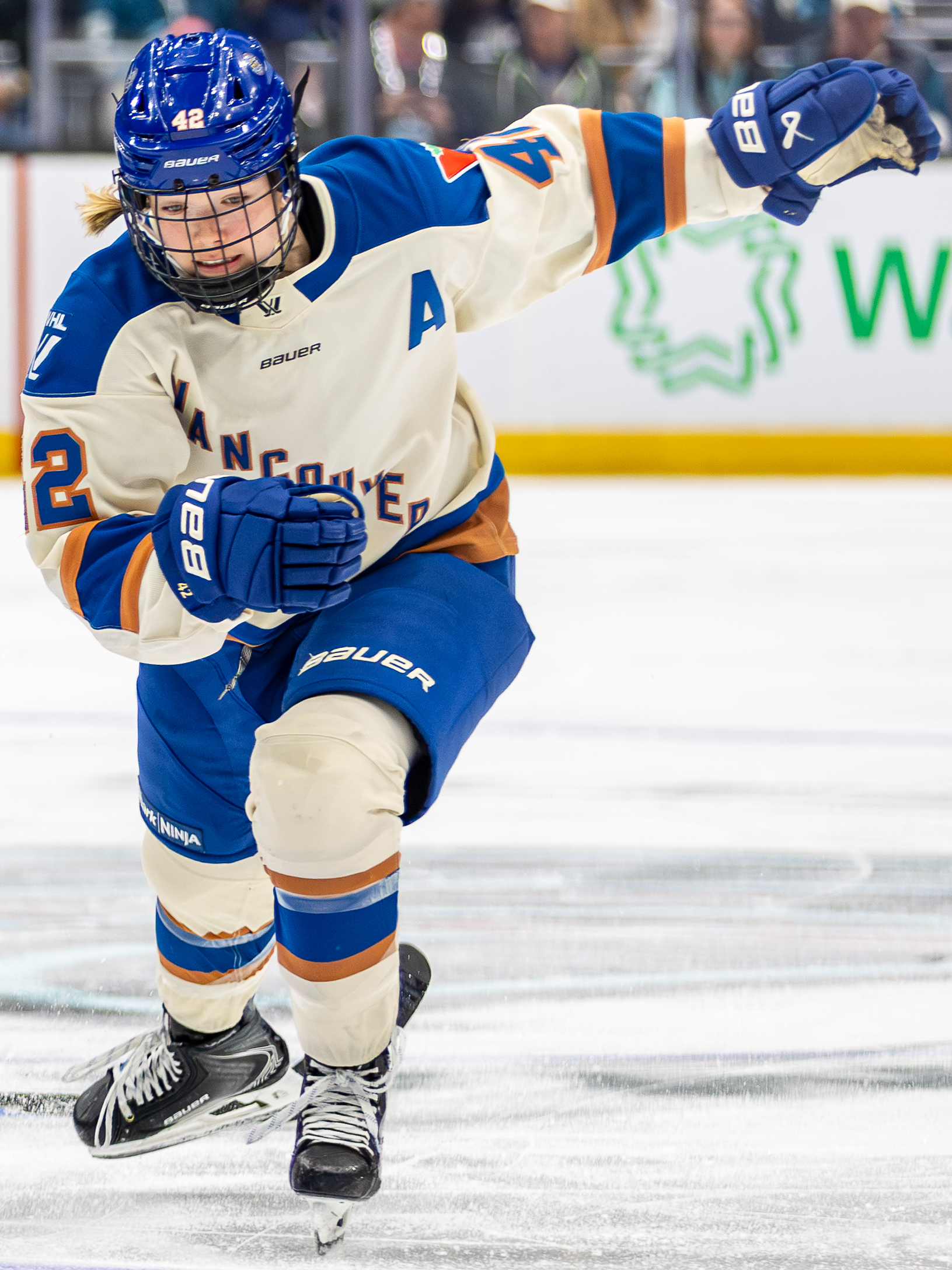
- Thompson with the Vancouver Goldeneyes in 2026
- Born: January 28, 1998 (age 28) Toronto, Ontario, Canada
- Height: 5 ft 8 in (173 cm)
- Weight: 147 lb (67 kg; 10 st 7 lb)
- Position: Defence
- Shot: Left
- PWHL team Former teams: Vancouver Goldeneyes; Minnesota Frost; PWHPA Toronto
- National team: Canada
- Playing career: 2016–2026
Medal record
Women's ice hockey
Representing Canada
Olympic Games
Gold medal – first place	2022 Beijing	Team
Silver medal – second place	2026 Milano Cortina	Team
World Championships
Gold medal – first place	2021 Canada
Silver medal – second place	2023 Canada
Silver medal – second place	2025 Czechia

Claire Margaret Thompson (born January 28, 1998) is a Canadian former professional ice hockey player. She played for the Minnesota Frost and the Vancouver Goldeneyes of the Professional Women's Hockey League (PWHL). She played college ice hockey at Princeton Tigers, where she finished her career fifth in all-time points by a defenceman in program history with 87 points.

She made her debut for the Canadian national team in 2019 in a two-game series against the United States held in Pittsburgh, Pennsylvania. She won gold with Team Canada at the 2021 IIHF Women's World Championship.

Thompson made her Olympic debut at the 2022 Winter Olympics held in Beijing, China. She helped Canada win gold and was named a tournament all-star. At the 2022 Olympics, Thompson set the Olympic ice-hockey record for points by a defenceman. She tallied 13 points on two goals and 11 assists, shattering the previous record of nine.

== Playing career ==
=== College ===
During her freshman year with the Princeton Tigers, Thompson skated in all 33 games finishing with 20 points on 6 goals and 14 assists; she was second in defence in scoring and the leading freshmen defender. She was also named to the ECAC All-Academic Team.

In her sophomore season, Thompson led the Tigers' defence in scoring, earning 21 points on 9 goals and 7 assists in 33 games. She was selected for Second-Team All-Ivy, ECAC All-Academic Team, and was named an AHCA All-America Scholar.

After her junior year, Thompson finished third on the Princeton Tigers team in scoring, leading the defencemen with 28 points on 9 goals and 19 assists. She was sixth in the nation in points per game for a defenceman (0.85). The Tigers won the Ivy League championship this season. Thompson was selected for First-Team All-ECAC and First-Team All-Ivy League and was a finalist for ECAC Best Defenseman. Additionally, she was an Academic All-Ivy League selection, named to the ECAC All-Academic Team, and was an AHCA All-American Scholar.

In her senior season with the Tigers, Thompson captained the team to their first-ever ECAC Championship. The team was scheduled to play Northeastern University in the first round of the NCAA tournament; however, the tournament was cancelled by the NCAA due to COVID-19. Thompson led the team's defence in scoring, finishing the season with 23 points on 7 goals and 16 assists in 31 games. She was selected for Second-team All-Ivy, Third-team All-ECAC, ECAC All-Tournament team, a finalist for the ECAC Mandi Schwartz Student-Athlete of the Year, Academic All-Ivy honoree, ECAC All-Academic, and AHCA All-America Scholar. Additionally, Thompson was selected as Princeton's nominee for NCAA woman of the year and was also a finalist for Princeton Athletics' C. Otto Von Kienbusch Award for Top Senior Female Student Athlete.

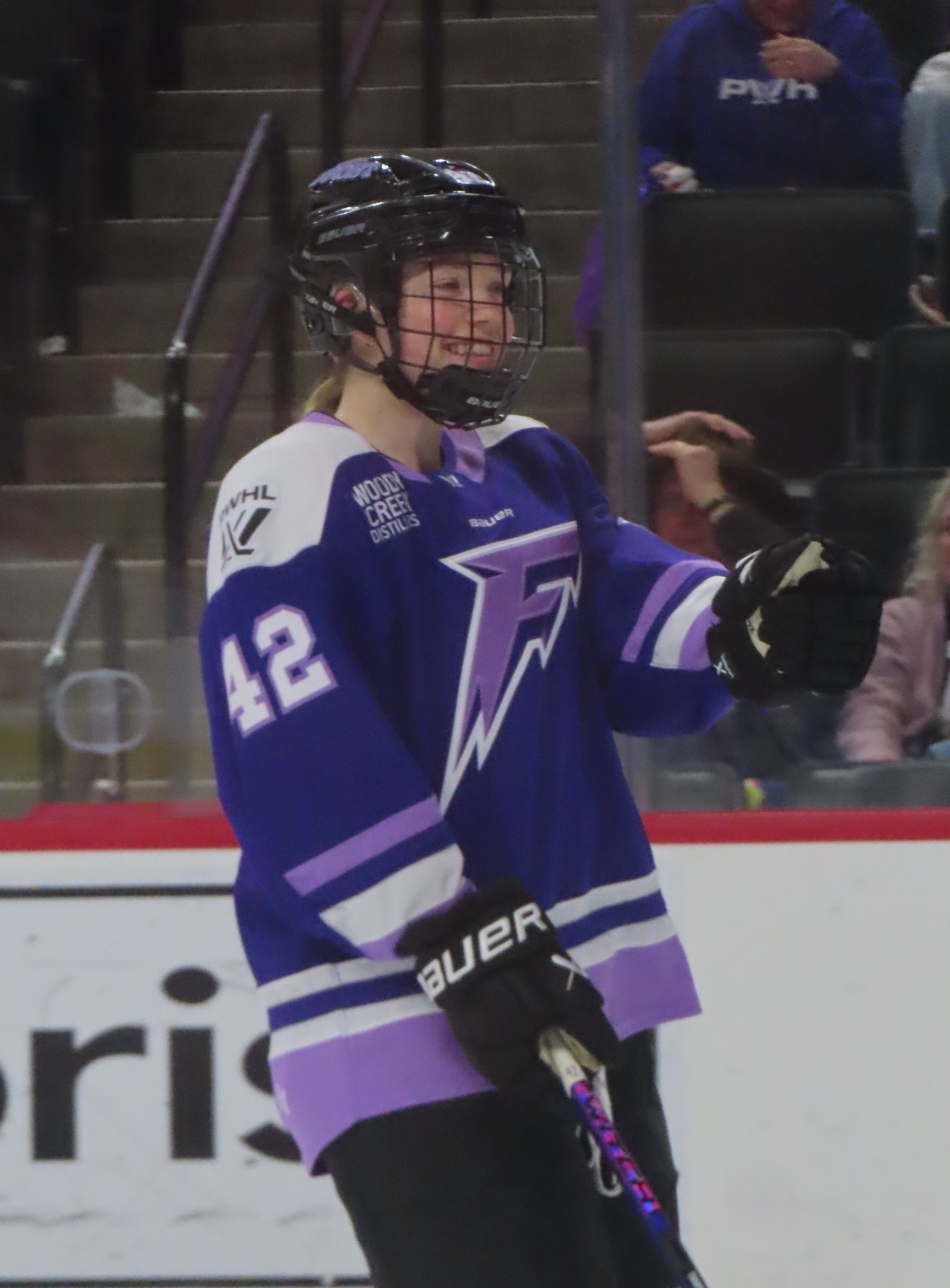
Thompson with the Minnesota Frost in 2025

=== Professional ===
Thompson was a full-time student at NYU School of Medicine during the 2022–23 PWHPA season, but participated in PWHPA and Team Canada events when she was able. Due to increasing demands of her second year of medical school during the inaugural PWHL season, she received a compassionate waiver exemption to play for New York, but was unable to sign a full-time contract since she was only available when she did not have academic obligations. She intended to sign a reserve contract with the club, but was unable to do so because she was on a student visa. Although she initially planned to remain in school the following year, she decided instead to declare for the 2024 PWHL Draft.

At the draft, Thompson was selected third overall by PWHL Minnesota. Soon after, she signed a two-year contract with the club, now rebranded as the Minnesota Frost. During the 2024–25 season, in her rookie season, she recorded four goals and 14 assists in 30 games, and finished third in scoring by a defender. She also became the second player in league history to record four points in one game, in a 5–2 win over the Ottawa Charge on December 20, 2024. Following the season she was named a finalist for the PWHL Defender of the Year.

During the league's expansion to eight teams ahead of the 2025–26 season, Thompson was left unprotected by the Frost and signed a one-year contract with the Vancouver Goldeneyes, becoming the first player to join the new club. On November 21, 2025, the Goldeneyes named Thompson as one of their alternate captains.

On October 1, 2026, Thompson announced her retirement from professional ice hockey to return full time to medical school at the New York University Grossman School of Medicine.

=== International ===
In August 2019, Thompson was named to Canada's Under-22/Development Team for a three-game series against the United States in Lake Placid, New York.

Thompson debuted for the Canada women's national ice hockey team in 2019 in a two-game series against the United S.tates held in Pittsburgh, Pennsylvania. She was then selected to attend the 2020 Women's Hockey World Championships that were not held due to the COVID-19 pandemic. She was one of 28 players invited to Hockey Canada's Centralization Camp, which represents the selection process for the Canadian women's team that shall compete in Ice hockey at the 2022 Winter Olympics.

On January 11, 2022, Thompson was named to Canada's 2022 Olympic team. Thompson finished with the highest plus-minus rating of the Olympic tournament with +23.

On January 9, 2026, Thompson was named to Canada's roster to compete at the 2026 Winter Olympics in Italy. During the team's quarterfinal game against Germany, she scored Canada's second goal in the 16th minute helping lead Canada to a 5–1 win and advance to the semifinals.

On October 1, 2026, Thompson announced her retirement from international ice hockey in order to resume her medical studies.

== Career statistics ==
=== Regular season and playoffs ===
Note: GP = Games played; G = Goals; A = Assists; Pts = Points; PIM = Penalty minutes;

			Regular season					Playoffs
Season	Team	League	GP	G	A	Pts	PIM	GP	G	A	Pts	PIM
2013–14	Toronto Jr. Aeros	Prov. WHL	1	0	0	0	0	3	1	1	2	0
2014–15	Toronto Jr. Aeros	Prov. WHL	38	5	19	24	24	14	0	5	5	4
2015–16	Toronto Jr. Aeros	Prov. WHL	34	5	13	18	14	11	1	4	5	12
2016–17	Princeton University	ECAC	33	6	14	20	12	—	—	—	—	—
2017–18	Princeton University	ECAC	32	9	7	16	30	—	—	—	—	—
2018–19	Princeton University	ECAC	33	9	19	28	28	—	—	—	—	—
2019–20	Princeton University	ECAC	31	7	16	23	27	—	—	—	—	—
2020–21	Toronto	PWHPA	4	0	1	1	0	—	—	—	—	—
2022–23	Team Sonnet	PWHPA	20	2	4	6	2	—	—	—	—	—
2024–25	Minnesota Frost	PWHL	30	4	14	18	8	8	0	6	6	4
2025–26	Vancouver Goldeneyes	PWHL	28	4	13	17	18	—	—	—	—	—
PWHPA totals			24	2	5	7	2	—	—	—	—	—
PWHL totals			58	8	27	35	26	8	0	6	6	4

=== International ===
Year	Team	Event	Result	GP	G	A	Pts	PIM
2021	Canada	WC	1st place, gold medalist(s)	7	0	4	4	0
2022	Canada	OG	1st place, gold medalist(s)	7	2	11	13	2
2023	Canada	WC	2nd place, silver medalist(s)	7	0	2	2	10
2025	Canada	WC	2nd place, silver medalist(s)	6	2	5	7	4
2026	Canada	OG	2nd place, silver medalist(s)	7	1	3	4	4
Senior totals				34	5	25	30	20

== Awards and honours ==
- 2017 ECAC All-Academic Team
- 2018 Second Team All-Ivy
- 2018 ECAC All-Academic Team
- 2018 AHCA All-America Scholar
- 2019 First Team All-Ivy
- 2019 First Team All-ECAC
- 2019 ECAC All-Academic Team
- 2019 AHCA All-America Scholar
- 2019 Academic All-Ivy League
- 2020 Second Team All-Ivy
- 2020 Third Team All-ECAC
- 2020 ECAC All-Academic Team
- 2020 AHCA All-America Scholar
- 2020 Academic All-Ivy League
- 2025 Walter Cup Champion
