= Malia Schneider =

Canadian ice hockey player (born 1998)

- Born: October 3, 1998 (age 28) Millarville, Alberta, Canada
- Height: 5 ft 6 in (168 cm)
- Position: Forward
- Shoots: Right
- PWHL team Former teams: Vancouver Goldeneyes; Ottawa Charge; Brynäs IF; SDE Hockey
- Playing career: 2017–present

Malia Macai Schneider (born October 3, 1998) is a Canadian professional ice hockey player for the Vancouver Goldeneyes of the Professional Women's Hockey League (PWHL). She previously played for the Ottawa Charge of the PWHL, Brynäs IF and SDE Hockey of the Swedish Women's Hockey League (SDHL). She played college ice hockey at Colgate.

== Playing career ==
=== College ===
Schneider began her collegiate career for Colgate during the 2017–18 season. During her freshman year, she recorded 16 goals and nine assists in 41 games. During the 2018 NCAA National Championship game against Clarkson, she scored the lone goal for Colgate in a 1–2 overtime loss. During the 2018–19 season, in her sophomore year, she recorded 19 goals and 23 assists in 38 games. During the 2019–20 season, in her junior year, she recorded 12 goals and 13 assists in 38 games. During the 2020–21 season, in her senior year, she recorded four goals and one assist in 23 games, in a season that was shortened due to the COVID-19 pandemic. During the 2021–22 season, as a graduate student, she recorded three goals and ten assists in 38 games.

=== Professional ===
Following her collegiate career, Schneider joined PWHL Ottawa as a reserve player. In late December 2023, she was released by Ottawa and joined Brynäs IF of the SDHL to pursue more playing time. During the 2023–24 season, she recorded five goals and five assists in 12 games during the regular season, and one goal in seven playoff games with Brynäs. In April 2024, after placing Becca Gilmore on the long-term injured reserve list, Ottawa signed Schneider to a standard player contract. She was scoreless in two games with Ottawa.

On July 4, 2024, she signed with SDE Hockey of the SDHL, During the 2024–25 season, she recorded ten goals and seven assists in 34 regular season games, and one goal in eight playoff games. She began the 2025–26 season with SDE Hockey and recorded two assists in ten games. In October 2025, she was invited to the Vancouver Goldeneyes' training camp. On November 20, 2025, she signed a reserve player contract with the Goldeneyes. On December 5, 2025, she was activated from the reserve place list, to replace Sarah Nurse, who was placed on long-term injury reserve. On January 22, 2026, she signed a ten-day contract with the Goldeneyes.

== International play ==
Medal record

Representing Canada

Ice hockey

World U18 Championships
Silver medal – second place	2016 Canada	

Schneider represented Canada at the 2016 IIHF U18 Women's World Championship and recorded one goal in five games and earned a silver medal.

== Personal life ==
Schneider was born to Keith and Shannon Schneider, and has two brothers and two sisters.

== Career statistics ==
=== Regular season and playoffs ===
			Regular season					Playoffs
Season	Team	League	GP	G	A	Pts	PIM	GP	G	A	Pts	PIM
2017–18	Colgate University	ECAC	41	16	9	25	28	—	—	—	—	—
2018–19	Colgate University	ECAC	38	19	23	42	43	—	—	—	—	—
2019–20	Colgate University	ECAC	38	12	13	25	18	—	—	—	—	—
2020–21	Colgate University	ECAC	23	4	1	5	6	—	—	—	—	—
2021–22	Colgate University	ECAC	38	3	10	13	12	—	—	—	—	—
2023–24	Brynäs IF	SDHL	12	5	5	10	8	7	1	0	1	2
2023–24	PWHL Ottawa	PWHL	2	0	0	0	0	—	—	—	—	—
2024–25	SDE Hockey	SDHL	34	10	7	17	16	8	1	0	1	0
2025–26	Vancouver Goldeneyes	PWHL	3	0	0	0	0	—	—	—	—	—
PWHL totals			5	0	0	0	0	0	0	0	0	0
SDHL totals			46	15	12	27	24	15	2	0	2	2

=== International ===
Year	Team	Event	Result	GP	G	A	Pts	PIM
2016	Canada	U18	2nd place, silver medalist(s)	5	1	0	1	2
Junior totals				5	1	0	1	2
