= Brianna Brooks =

Canadian ice hockey player (born 2002)

- Born: June 28, 2002 (age 24) Whitby, Ontario, Canada
- Height: 5 ft 9 in (175 cm)
- Position: Forward
- Shoots: Right
- PWHL team: Vancouver Goldeneyes

Brianna Brooks (born June 28, 2002) is a Canadian professional ice hockey forward for the Vancouver Goldeneyes of the Professional Women's Hockey League (PWHL). She played college ice hockey for the New Hampshire Wildcats and the Penn State Nittany Lions.

== Early life ==
Brooks is from Whitby, Ontario. Before college she skated for the Durham West Jr. Lightning, totaling 113 points (50 goals, 63 assists) across three seasons, and won U18 National gold with Team Ontario as well as the Canada Winter Games.

== Playing career ==
=== College ===
Brooks began her collegiate career at New Hampshire in 2020–21. In 2022–23 she led UNH with 27 points (10 goals, 17 assists) in 36 games.

She transferred to Penn State for 2023–24 and tallied 32 points (14 goals, 18 assists) in 38 games, earning Second Team All-CHA honors. In 2024–25, Penn State’s first season in Atlantic Hockey America (AHA), she served as an alternate captain and posted 24 points (11 goals, 13 assists) in 38 games. Brooks scored twice in the AHA championship game as Penn State captured its third straight postseason title.

=== Professional ===
On June 24, 2025, Brooks was selected in the fourth round, 32nd overall, by the Vancouver Goldeneyes in the 2025 PWHL Draft. She was the first player from Penn State to be drafted into the PWHL. On October 28, 2025, she signed a one-year contract with the Goldeneyes. She signed a 10-day Standard Player contract on March 1, 2026 and made her debut for the team the same day against the Toronto Sceptres.

== Career statistics ==
| | | | Regular season | | | | | Playoffs |
| Season | Team | League | GP | G | A | Pts | PIM | GP | G | A | Pts | PIM |
|---|---|---|---|---|---|---|---|---|---|---|---|---|
| 2020–21 | New Hampshire | Hockey East | 18 | 4 | 3 | 7 | 12 | — | — | — | — | — |
| 2021–22 | New Hampshire | Hockey East | 34 | 7 | 12 | 19 | 22 | — | — | — | — | — |
| 2022–23 | New Hampshire | Hockey East | 36 | 10 | 17 | 27 | 18 | — | — | — | — | — |
| 2023–24 | Penn State | CHA | 38 | 14 | 18 | 32 | 8 | — | — | — | — | — |
| 2024–25 | Penn State | AHA | 38 | 11 | 13 | 24 | 12 | — | — | — | — | — |
| NCAA totals | | | 164 | 46 | 63 | 109 | 72 | — | — | — | — | — |

Source: Hockey East / College Hockey Inc.

== Awards and honours ==
| Honour | Year |
College
| Second Team All-CHA | 2024 |
