= Gabby Rosenthal =

American ice hockey player (born 1999)

- Born: September 13, 1999 (age 27) Blaine, Minnesota, U.S.
- Height: 5 ft 7 in (170 cm)
- Position: Forward
- Shoots: Right
- PWHL team Former teams: Vancouver Goldeneyes; New York Sirens
- Playing career: 2024–present

Gabby Rosenthal (born September 13, 1999) is an American professional ice hockey forward for the Vancouver Goldeneyes of the Professional Women's Hockey League (PWHL). She previously played for the New York Sirens of the PWHL. She played college ice hockey at Ohio State.

== Early life ==
Rosenthal attended Blaine High School in Blaine, Minnesota, where she played ice hockey for four years, serving as team captain her senior year. She finished her career at Blaine with 77 goals and 85 assists.

== Playing career ==
=== College ===
Rosenthal began her collegiate hockey career at Ohio State. During the 2018–19 season, in her freshman year, she recorded one goal and six assists in 27 games. During the 2019–20 season, in her sophomore year, she recorded 12 goals and six assists in 38 games. During the 2020–21 season, in her junior year, she recorded five goals and six assists in 20 games, in a season that was shortened due to the COVID-19 pandemic. She led the team with 211 faceoff wins.

During the 2021–22 season, in her senior year, she recorded 19 goals and 16 assists in 38 games. She led the WCHA and ranked second nationally with 577 faceoff wins. She helped lead the Buckeyes to their first NCAA women's ice hockey tournament championship in 2022. During the 2022–23 season, as a graduate student, she recorded 21 goals and 16 assists in 35 games. She ranked second in the WCHA, and fourth nationally, with 500 faceoff wins.

=== Professional ===
On June 10, 2024, Rosenthal was drafted in the fourth round, 19th overall, by PWHL New York in the 2024 PWHL Draft. In November 2024, following pre-season mini camp, she signed a one-year contract with New York.

On June 9, 2025, Rosenthal was drafted ninth overall by the Vancouver Goldeneyes in the 2025 PWHL Expansion Draft. On June 20, 2025, she signed a one-year contract with Vancouver.

== Personal life ==
Rosenthal was born to Charles and Jennifer Rosenthal, and has two brothers, Zach and Ryan, and two sisters, Jorden and Lexy.

== Career statistics ==
			Regular season					Playoffs
Season	Team	League	GP	G	A	Pts	PIM	GP	G	A	Pts	PIM
2018–19	Ohio State University	WCHA	27	1	6	7	4	—	—	—	—	—
2019–20	Ohio State University	WCHA	38	12	6	18	22	—	—	—	—	—
2020–21	Ohio State University	WCHA	20	5	6	11	12	—	—	—	—	—
2021–22	Ohio State University	WCHA	38	19	16	35	48	—	—	—	—	—
2022–23	Ohio State University	WCHA	35	21	16	37	34	—	—	—	—	—
2024–25	New York Sirens	PWHL	29	1	3	4	8	—	—	—	—	—
2025–26	Vancouver Goldeneyes	PWHL	26	1	1	2	12	—	—	—	—	—
PWHL totals			55	2	4	6	20	—	—	—	—	—
