= Katie Chan =

Canadian ice hockey player (born 2003)

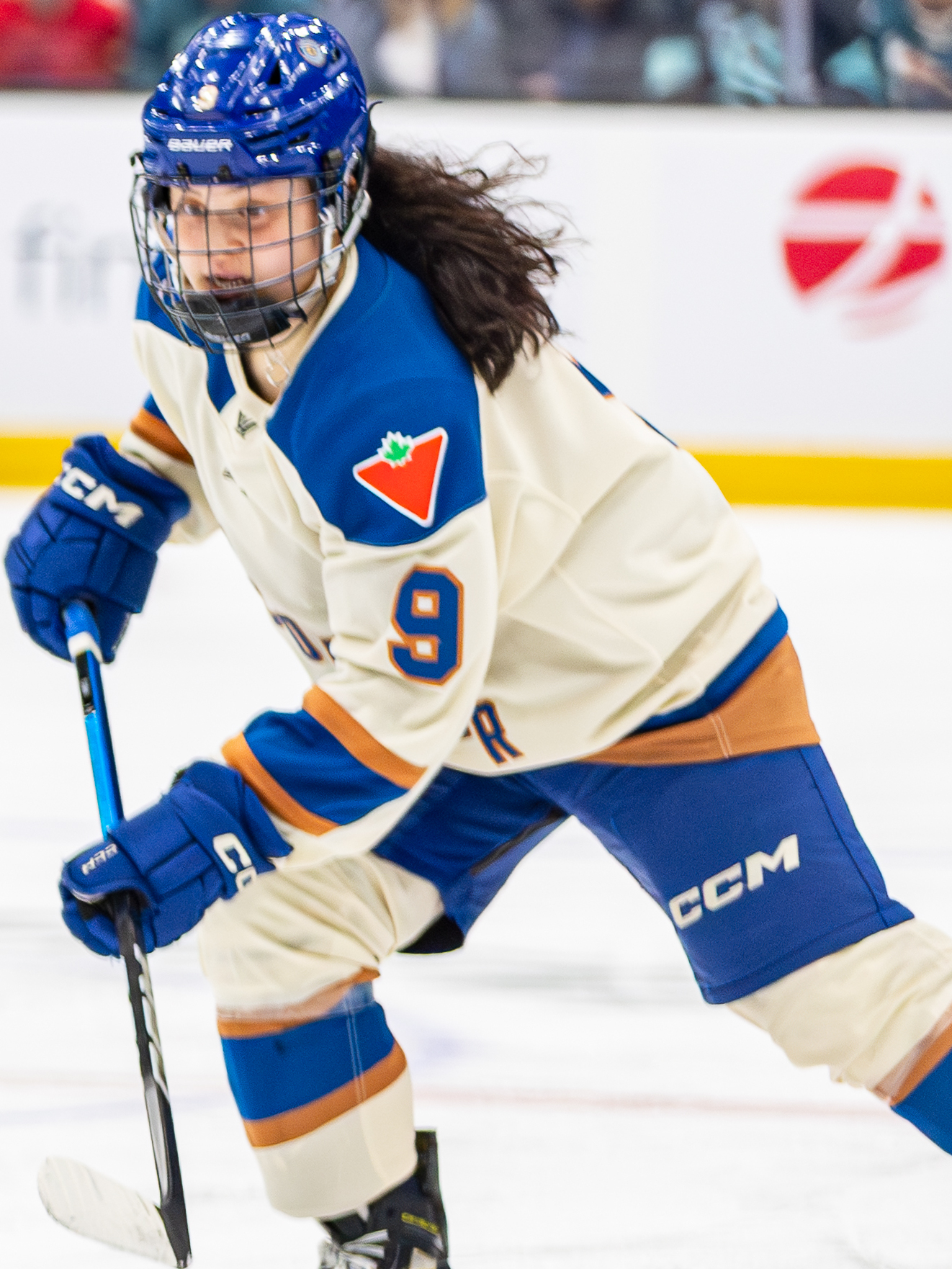
- Chan with the Vancouver Goldeneyes in 2026
- Born: January 5, 2003 (age 23) Richmond, British Columbia, Canada
- Height: 5 ft 2 in (157 cm)
- Position: Forward
- Shoots: Left
- PWHL team Former teams: Vancouver Goldeneyes; Färjestad BK
- Playing career: 2021–present

Kaitlin Melissa Chan (born January 5, 2003) is a Canadian professional ice hockey player for the Vancouver Goldeneyes of the Professional Women's Hockey League (PWHL). She previously played for Färjestad BK of the Swedish Women's Hockey League (SDHL). She played college ice hockey at Colgate and Cornell.

== Early life ==
Chan was born to Robert and Marilyn Chan and has one sister, Jessie. She attended South Delta Secondary School where she played ice hockey, basketball and volleyball.

== Playing career ==
=== College ===
Chan began her collegiate career for Colgate during the 2021–22 season. During her freshman year, she recorded eight goals and 13 assists in 39 games. During the 2022–23 season, in her sophomore year, she recorded eight goals and nine assists in 40 games.

On August 17, 2023, Chan transferred to Cornell. During the 2023–24 season, in her junior year, she recorded nine goals and ten assists in 16 games, in a season that was shortened due to injury. During the 2024–25 season, in her senior year, she recorded nine goals and ten assists in 35 games.

=== Professional ===
On June 11, 2025, Chan signed with Färjestad BK of the SDHL. During the 2025–26 season, she recorded six goals and ten assists in 17 games during the regular season. In October 2025, she was invited to the Vancouver Goldeneyes' training camp. On November 20, 2025, she signed a one-year contract with the Goldeneyes.

== Career statistics ==
			Regular season					Playoffs
Season	Team	League	GP	G	A	Pts	PIM	GP	G	A	Pts	PIM
2021–22	Colgate University	ECAC	39	8	13	21	4	—	—	—	—	—
2022–23	Colgate University	ECAC	40	8	9	17	0	—	—	—	—	—
2023–24	Cornell University	ECAC	16	9	10	19	6	—	—	—	—	—
2024–25	Cornell University	ECAC	35	9	10	19	4	—	—	—	—	—
2025–26	Färjestad BK	SDHL	17	6	10	16	2	—	—	—	—	—
2025–26	Vancouver Goldeneyes	PWHL	17	1	0	1	4	—	—	—	—	—
SDHL totals			17	6	10	16	2	—	—	—	—	—
PWHL totals			17	1	0	1	4	—	—	—	—	—
