= Mannon McMahon =

American ice hockey player (born 2001)

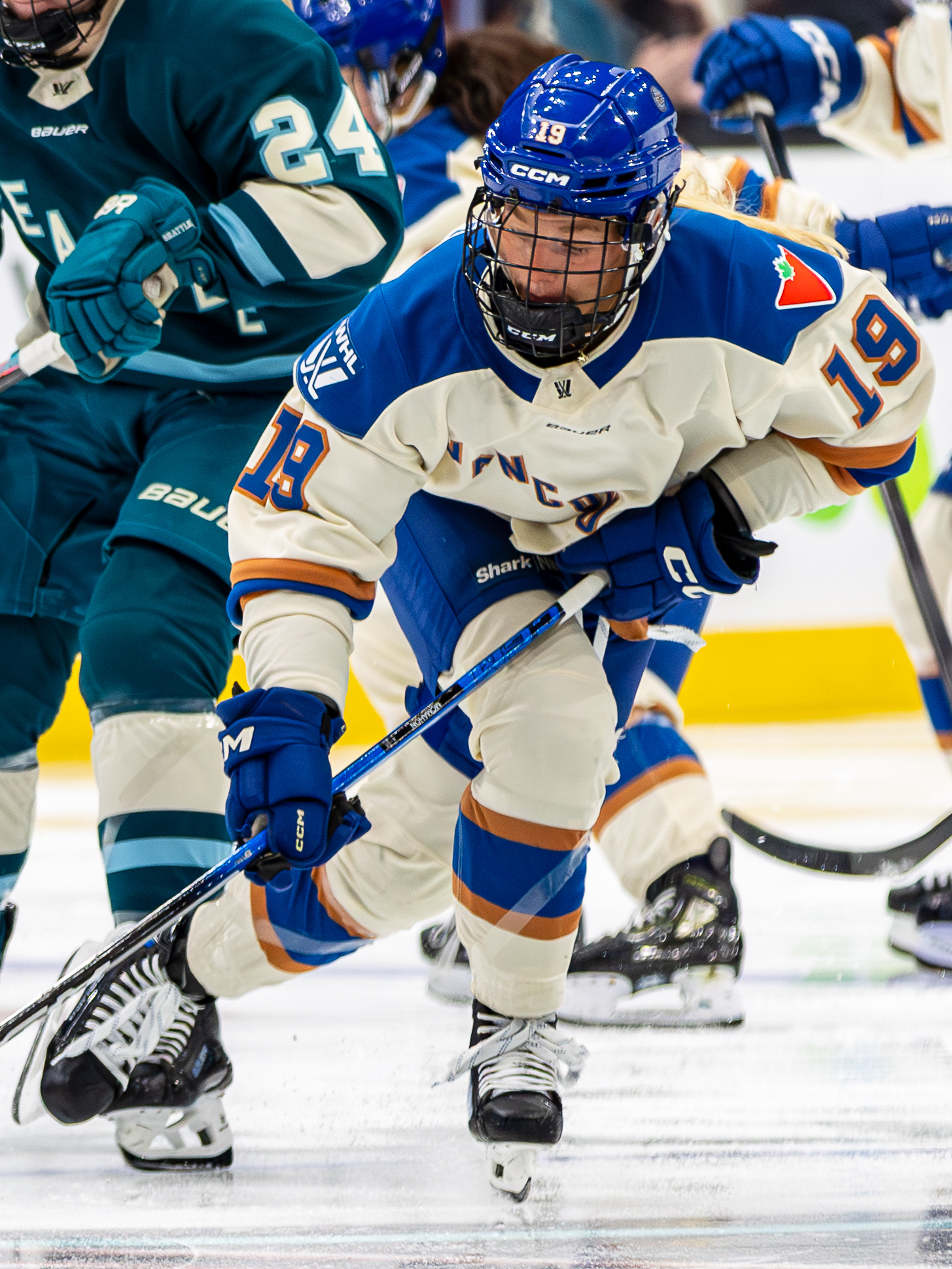
- McMahon with the Vancouver Goldeneyes in 2026
- Born: July 29, 2001 (age 25) Maple Grove, Minnesota, U.S.
- Height: 5 ft 7 in (170 cm)
- Position: Forward
- Shoots: Right
- PWHL team Former teams: Vancouver Goldeneyes; Ottawa Charge
- Playing career: 2024–present

Mannon Marie McMahon (born July 29, 2001) is an American professional ice hockey player who is a forward for the Vancouver Goldeneyes of the Professional Women's Hockey League (PWHL). She previously played for the Ottawa Charge of the PWHL. She played college ice hockey at Minnesota Duluth.

== Early life ==
McMahon attended Maple Grove Senior High School in Maple Grove, Minnesota, where she played ice hockey and soccer.

== Playing career ==
=== College ===
McMahon began her collegiate career for Minnesota Duluth during the 2019–20 season. During her freshman year, she recorded two goals and three assists in 36 games. During the 2020–21 season in her sophomore year, she recorded one goal and two assists in 19 games, in a season that was shortened due to the COVID-19 pandemic. During the 2021–22 season in her junior year, she recorded four goals and 15 assists in 40 games. During the 2022–23 season in her senior year, she recorded ten goals and 19 assists in 39 games.

On May 12, 2023, McMahon was named co-captain for the 2023–24 season. As a graduate student, she recorded a career-high 14 goals and 17 assists in 39 games. During the first round of the 2024 NCAA tournament, she scored the game-winning goal in double-overtime against UConn to help the Bulldogs advance to the quarterfinals.

McMahon set the program record with 173 consecutive games played, never missing a game during her collegiate career. Her career games played is also tied for the fourth most games played by any WCHA player in conference history.

=== Professional ===
On June 10, 2024, McMahon was drafted in the fifth round, 26th overall, by PWHL Ottawa in the 2024 PWHL Draft. In November 2024, during pre-season camps, she scored one goal in two games. Following her performance during the pre-season, she signed a one-year contract with Ottawa. On December 3, 2024 she scored her first career goal in a game against the Toronto Sceptres. During the 2024–25 season she recorded four goals and four assists in 30 regular season games, and one goal in eight games during the 2025 PWHL playoffs. On July 24, 2025, she signed a one-year contract extension with the Charge.

On January 18, 2026, McMahon was traded to the Vancouver Goldeneyes, along with Anna Meixner and Anna Shokhina, in exchange for Michela Cava, Emma Greco, and Brooke McQuigge.

== Personal life ==
McMahon was born to Kendell and Teresa McMahon, and has two brothers, Mason, and Aiden. According to her USA Hockey profile, McMahons's favorite post-game meal is a peanut butter and jelly sandwich.

== Career statistics ==
			Regular season					Playoffs
Season	Team	League	GP	G	A	Pts	PIM	GP	G	A	Pts	PIM
2019–20	University of Minnesota Duluth	WCHA	36	2	3	5	0	—	—	—	—	—
2020–21	University of Minnesota Duluth	WCHA	19	1	2	3	2	—	—	—	—	—
2021–22	University of Minnesota Duluth	WCHA	40	4	15	19	14	—	—	—	—	—
2022–23	University of Minnesota Duluth	WCHA	39	10	19	29	18	—	—	—	—	—
2023–24	University of Minnesota Duluth	WCHA	39	14	17	31	28	—	—	—	—	—
2024–25	Ottawa Charge	PWHL	30	4	4	8	6	8	1	0	1	0
2025–26	Ottawa Charge	PWHL	13	1	1	2	8	—	—	—	—	—
2025–26	Vancouver Goldeneyes	PWHL	17	3	1	4	8	—	—	—	—	—
PWHL totals			60	8	6	14	22	8	1	0	1	0
