= Nina Jobst-Smith =

German-Canadian ice hockey player

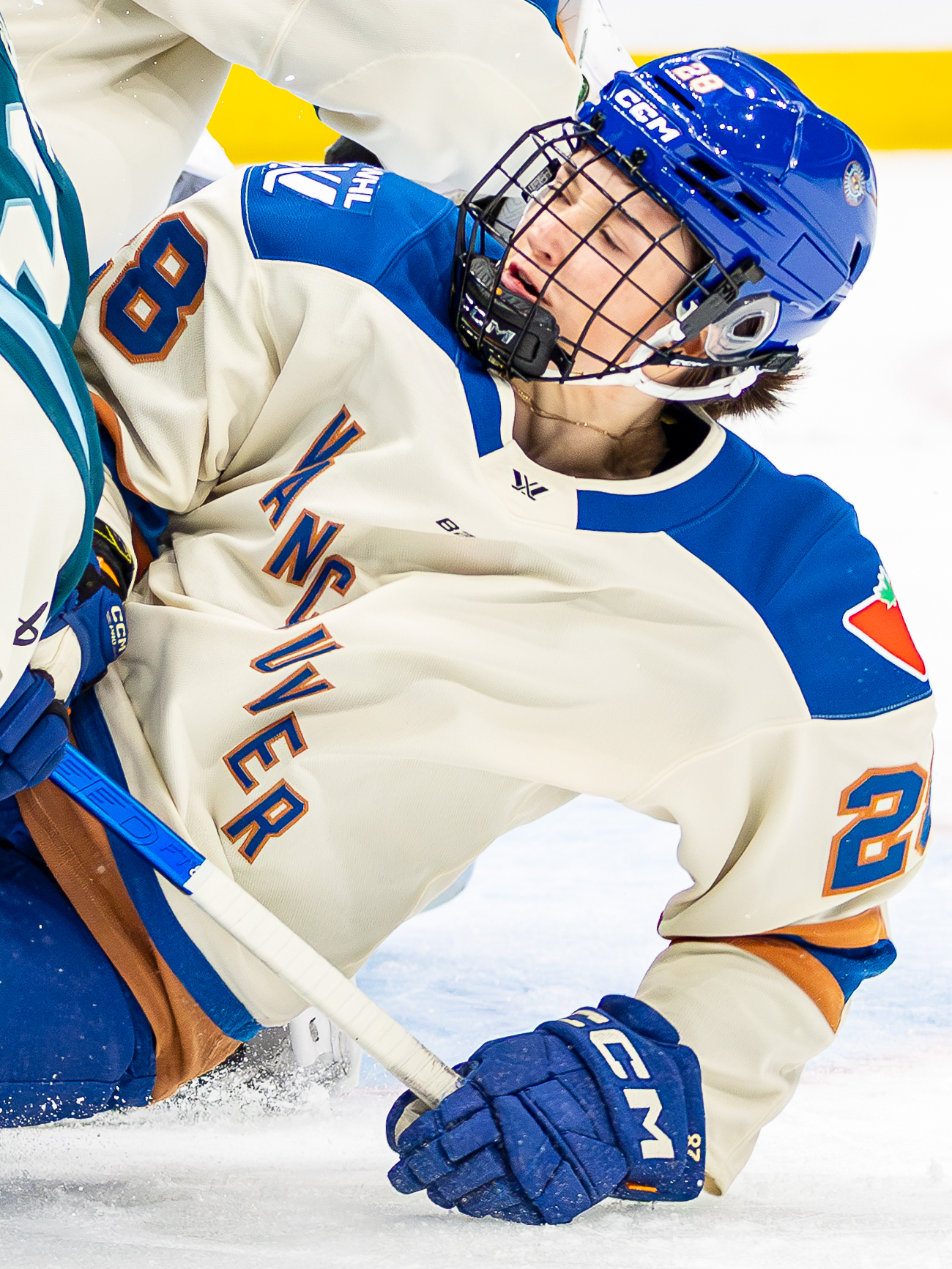
- Jobst-Smith with the Vancouver Goldeneyes in 2026
- Born: August 30, 2001 (age 25) North Vancouver, British Columbia, Canada
- Height: 170 cm (5 ft 7 in)
- Weight: 68 kg (150 lb; 10 st 10 lb)
- Position: Defence
- Shoots: Right
- PWHL team Former teams: Detroit Clutch; ECDC Memmingen; Vancouver Goldeneyes
- National team: Germany
- Playing career: 2018–present

Katarina Mina Louise "Nina" Jobst-Smith (born 30 August 2001) is a German-Canadian professional ice hockey player for the Detroit Clutch of the Professional Women's Hockey League (PWHL). She previously played for the Vancouver Goldeneyes of the PWHL. She played college ice hockey at Minnesota Duluth. She is also a member of Germany women's national ice hockey team.

== Playing career ==
As a teen, she played the 2018–19 season with ECDC Memmingen in the German Women's Ice Hockey League (DFEL) and the EWHL Super Cup.

In 2020, she began her college ice hockey career with Minnesota Duluth in the Western Collegiate Hockey Association (WCHA).

In the 2025 PWHL Draft, Jobst-Smith was drafted in the third round, nineteenth overall, by the Vancouver Goldeneyes, a pick Vancouver acquired in a trade with the Toronto Sceptres. On October 28, 2025, she signed a two-year contract with the Goldeneyes. During the 2025–26 season, she recorded three assists in 20 games.

During the league's expansion to 12 teams ahead of the 2026–27 season, she signed a one-year contract with the Detroit Clutch on 14 June 2026.

== International play ==
Jobst-Smith represented Germany at the IIHF World Women's Championship in 2021, 2022, and 2023, and at the Olympic qualification tournament for the 2022 Winter Olympics. She was selected by the coaches as one of Germany's top-three players at the 2022 IIHF Women's World Championship.

With Germany making their first appearance in women's ice hockey at the Olympics since 2014, the February 5, 2026 match versus Sweden meant that every member of the German roster were making their Olympic debut. Jobst-Smith led all players with 25:34 of ice time. She scored on Germany's first shot on goal in the game in a 4-1 loss.

On February 9, 2026, Germany's third game at the Olympics, Jobst-Smith scored the game winning goal versus France, contributing in a 2-1 overtime win.

== Career statistics ==
=== Regular season and playoffs ===
			Regular season					Playoffs
Season	Team	League	GP	G	A	Pts	PIM	GP	G	A	Pts	PIM
2020–21	University of Minnesota Duluth	WCHA	17	1	2	3	4	—	—	—	—	—
2021–22	University of Minnesota Duluth	WCHA	40	0	9	9	6	—	—	—	—	—
2022–23	University of Minnesota Duluth	WCHA	39	5	20	25	10	—	—	—	—	—
2023–24	University of Minnesota Duluth	WCHA	39	4	8	12	17	—	—	—	—	—
2024–25	University of Minnesota Duluth	WCHA	37	3	15	18	18	—	—	—	—	—
2025–26	Vancouver Goldeneyes	PWHL	20	0	3	3	0	—	—	—	—	—
PWHL totals			20	0	3	3	0	—	—	—	—	—

=== International ===
Year	Team	Event	Result	GP	G	A	Pts	PIM
2021	Germany	WC	8th	6	0	1	1	0
2022	Germany	WC	9th	4	0	2	2	0
2022	Germany	OGQ	DNQ	3	1	1	2	2
2023	Germany	WC	8th	6	1	2	3	0
2024	Germany	WC	6th	6	0	0	0	4
2025	Germany	OGQ	Q	3	0	2	2	0
2025	Germany	WC	8th	5	2	1	3	2
2026	Germany	OG	7th	5	2	1	3	2
Senior totals				32	5	7	12	8
