= Vancouver Goldeneyes =

PWHL ice hockey team in Vancouver

- City: Vancouver, British Columbia
- League: PWHL
- Conference: Western
- Founded: 2025
- Home arena: Pacific Coliseum
- Colours: Pacific blue, coastal cream, earthy bronze, sunset gold, sky blue
- Owner: Mark Walter Group
- General manager: Alison Izzi
- Head coach: Cara Gardner Morey
- Captain: Ashton Bell
- Website: thepwhl.com/en/teams/vancouver-goldeneyes

Championships
- Regular season titles: 0
- Walter Cups: 0

The Vancouver Goldeneyes are a professional ice hockey team based in Vancouver that competes in the Professional Women's Hockey League (PWHL). They are the league's first announced expansion franchise and joined in the 2025–26 season, part of the league's first round of expansions alongside the Seattle Torrent. Their home games are played at the Pacific Coliseum.

== History ==
=== Founding ===
On April 23, 2025, the PWHL announced that their first expansion franchise would be located in Vancouver and would begin play in the 2025–26 season. The team announced that their home arena will be the Pacific Coliseum, former home of the WHL’s Vancouver Giants and the NHL’s Vancouver Canucks.

The announcement came after speculation that the PWHL would expand to both Vancouver and Seattle. Rumours of a Vancouver franchise gained momentum after the PWHL Takeover Tour – a series of exhibition games staged at neutral venues across cities in Canada and the United States – drew a record-breaking 19,038 spectators to Rogers Arena, current home of the Vancouver Canucks, on January 8, 2025.

On May 23, 2025, PWHL Vancouver announced that Cara Gardner Morey would be appointed as the club's first general manager. Brian Idalski was named as the team's first head coach on June 23, 2025. The team's first leadership group was announced on November 21, 2025, consisting of captain Ashton Bell and alternate captains Sarah Nurse and Claire Thompson.

=== Early Years ===
Ahead of their first season, the Goldeneyes were projected by some analysts to be serious Walter Cup contenders. The team won their inaugural game 4-3 at home against the Seattle Torrent, becoming the first PWHL team to win their inaugural game on home ice. In the game, Sarah Nurse scored the first goal in franchise history, and Abby Boreen scored the franchise's first game-winning goal in overtime. The team was quickly embraced by fans in Vancouver. The team led the league in regular-season attendance, with over 11,200 fans attending each game. However, the team struggled on the ice, especially on the road, and finished 6th on the season.

Despite missing the playoffs, the Goldeneyes won the PWHL's Gold Plan on a late season hot streak, earning the team their first franchise first overall pick in the 2026 Entry Draft. With the pick, Vancouver selected Caroline Harvey from the University of Wisconsin.

In the lead-up to their second season, the team announced that Cara Gardner Morey was stepping down as the team's general manager, and would instead be the team's coach. Former coach Brian Idalski had been fired earlier in the summer. In September 2026, it was announced that the team hired Alison Izzi as the team's general manager.

== Team identity ==
As part of the expansion announcement, the team's colours were revealed to be Pacific blue and cream. The PWHL also stated that the franchise would operate under the temporary name PWHL Vancouver until a permanent brand identity is announced, following a similar approach taken by the "Inaugural Six" teams during the 2023–24 PWHL season.

On October 21, 2025, Vancouver released their inaugural season jerseys, which feature the city name diagonally across the front. The jerseys are produced by Bauer. The new team name, the Vancouver Goldeneyes, as well as the new logo, were revealed on November 6, 2025. They will be brought into circulation during the 2026–27 season. The team is named after the common goldeneye—a diving duck endemic to North America including the coastal waters and lakes of British Columbia.

== Season-by-season record ==
Key of colours and symbols
Colour/symbol	Explanation
†	Indicates League Championship
*	Indicates Regular Season Championship

Year by year results
Season	GP	RW	OW	OL	RL	Pts	GF	GA	GD	Finish	Playoffs
2025–26	30	9	3	4	14	37	68	81	−13	6th	Did not qualify

== Players and personnel ==
=== Current roster ===
As of July 18, 2026

No.	Nat	Player	Pos	S/G	Age	Acquired	Birthplace
21	(Canada)	Ashton Bell (C)	D	R	26	2025	Deloraine, Manitoba
22	(United States)	Abigail Boreen	F	R	26	2026	Somerset, Wisconsin
50	(Canada)	Kristen Campbell	G	L	28	2025	Brandon, Manitoba
9	(Canada)	Katie Chan	F	L	23	2025	Toronto, Ontario
	(United States)	Jules Constantinople	D	L	22	2026	East Haven, Connecticut
8	(United States)	Izzy Daniel	F	R	26	2025	Minneapolis, Minnesota
	(United States)	Katie DeSa	G	L	22	2026	Pawcatuck, Connecticut
	(Canada)	Laura Fuoco	F	L	23	2026	Mississauga, Ontario
12	(Canada)	Jenn Gardiner	F	L	25	2025	Surrey, British Columbia
	(United States)	Caroline Harvey	D	L	24	2026	Pelham, New Hampshire
16	(Canada)	Sophie Jaques	D	R	26	2025	Toronto, Ontario
	(Sweden)	Thea Johansson	F	L	23	2026	Ljungby, Sweden
2	(Finland)	Sini Karjalainen	D	L	27	2025	Posio, Finland
96	(Czech Republic)	Dominika Lásková	D	R	29	2026	Prague, Czech Republic
38	(Canada)	Emerance Maschmeyer	G	L	32	2025	Bruderheim, Alberta
	(Canada)	Ashley Messier	D	R	24	2025	Wilcox, Saskatchewan
34	(Canada)	Hannah Miller	F	L	30	2025	North Vancouver, British Columbia
20	(Canada)	Sarah Nurse (A)	F	L	31	2025	Hamilton, Ontario
15	(United States)	Gabby Rosenthal	F	R	27	2025	Blaine, Minnesota
7	(United States)	Madison Samoskevich (RFA)	D	L	23	2025	Sandy Hook, Connecticut
51	(United States)	Anna Segedi	F	L	25	2025	Commerce Township, Michigan
42	(Canada)	Claire Thompson (A) (UFA)	D	L	28	2025	Toronto, Ontario
13	(Czech Republic)	Tereza Vanišová	F	L	30	2025	Strakonice, Czechia
18	(Canada)	Malia Schneider	F	R	28	2025	Millarville, Alberta
19	(United States)	Mannon McMahon	F	R	25	2026	Maple Grove, Minnesota

=== Reserves ===
As of December 5, 2025

No.	Nat	Player	Pos	S/G	Age	Acquired	Birthplace
17	(Canada)	Brianna Brooks	F	R	24	2025	Whitby, Ontario

=== Team captains ===
- Ashton Bell, 2025–present

=== Head Coaches ===
- Brian Idalski, 2025–2026
- Cara Gardner Morey, 2026–present

=== General managers ===
- Cara Gardner Morey, 2025–2026
- Alison Izzi, 2026–present

=== First-round draft picks ===
- 2025: Michelle Karvinen (7th overall)
- 2026: Caroline Harvey (1st overall)
