= Felizia Wikner-Zienkiewicz =

Swedish ice hockey player (born 1999)

- Born: 17 September 1999 (age 27) Kungsbacka, Sweden
- Height: 165 cm (5 ft 5 in)
- Weight: 52 kg (115 lb; 8 st 3 lb)
- Position: Left wing
- Shoots: Left
- SDHL team Former teams: Frölunda HC: Brynäs IF; HV71; MODO Hockey
- National team: Sweden
- Playing career: 2015–present

Elin Felizia Wikner-Zienkiewicz (born 17 September 1999) is a Swedish ice hockey player for Frölunda HC of the Swedish Women's Hockey League (SDHL) and member of the Swedish national team. She has represented Sweden at the Winter Olympic Games and IIHF Women's World Championship.

== Playing career ==
Wikner-Zienkiewicz was introduced to ice hockey via her older brothers, Johannes (born 1990) and Kristoffer (born 1993), who both played throughout her childhood. At age five, she began playing with the minor ice hockey department of Hanhals IF in her hometown of Kungsbacka on the western coast of Sweden. Though Hanhals IF had a team that was active in the women's Division 1, Wikner-Zienkiewicz was the only girl on the teams for her age group; the club also had a secondary women's team, and she was able to practice with that team in addition to playing with boys of her age.

When Hanhals IF dissolved its women's team after the 2009–10 Riksserien season, Wikner-Zienkiewicz opted to move to Hovås HC, based in Hovås, Gothenburg Municipality, about 20 kilometres (12 mi) from Kungsbacka. The move was motivated by a desire continue playing with a women's team and to also play on teams with both boys and girls of her age. She was the only girl in the group of players born in 1999, however Hovås HC had a number of girls who were nearly her age in the groups for players born in 2000 and 2001, including goaltender Anna Amholt, and she played on teams with them. Her Division I debut was made with the Hovås women's representative team in the 2012–13 season and she tallied 3 goals for 3 points in nine games while continuing to spend most of her time playing with teams in the minor department. In 2014–15, she split her time between the women's representative team and the Hovås under-16 team in the U16 Division 1, the second-tier national boys' under-16 league.

Wikner-Zienkiewicz was admitted to the NIU hockeygymnasium (Note: A hockeygymnasium is a collaborative program created by a gymnasieskola and an elite ice hockey club that allows students to focus on developing their ice hockey abilities while completing their secondary education. The highest level of hockeygymnasiet designation is Nationellt Idrottsutbildning (lit. 'National Sports Education') or NIU. NIU hockeygymnasier are certified by the Swedish Ice Hockey Association as meeting requirements necessary to consistently produce players who, at a minimum, reach the elite senior national level. NIU programs are limited to 12–14 students per year, who are selected on the basis of grades and ice hockey ability.) of Örnsköldsvik Gymnasium and MODO Hockey in Örnsköldsvik, which has a reputation for developing elite players and a list of alumni including icons of Swedish ice hockey Peter Forsberg, Victor Hedman, Maria Lindh, Emma Nordin, and Daniel and Henrik Sedin. Though Örnsköldsvik is situated in the north-central historical province of Ångermanland on the east coast of Sweden and is quite far from Kungsbacka, Wikner-Zienkiewicz selected MODO hockeygymnasiet because she had a number of relatives in nearby Umeå and Kramfors.

=== MODO Hockey ===
Wikner-Zienkiewicz made her debut in the Riksserien (rebranded as SDHL in 2016) playing with MODO Hockey during the 2015–16 season, her first year at the hockeygymnasium. Her rookie season in the elite league did not culminate in any points, however, she skated in 25 games, the youngest player to play such a volume that season, and gained valuable experience playing alongside future senior national team teammates Ebba Berglund, Olivia Carlsson, Johanna Olofsson, Celine Tedenby, and Agnes Åker. As would continue throughout her time with MODO, she also played a limited number of games with MODO's secondary team in the Damettan (called Division 1 during 2007–2015; reconfigured as NDHL in 2021) and with the club's junior teams.

She scored her first SDHL goal in the 2016–17 season and finished the season with 3 goals for 3 points in 32 games. MODO signed several import players for the 2017–18 season and she had the opportunity to play with international players Ivana Bilic, Michela Cava, Jenelle Kohanchuk, Viktorie Švejdová, and Kaitlyn Tougas, in addition to future Swedish Olympic national team teammates Paula Bergström, Emma Söderberg, and Mina Waxin. Her first assist was recorded in the 2017–18 season and she ranked tenth on the team for points, with 4 goals and 9 assists for 13 points in 36 games.

=== HV71 ===
Upon completion of her secondary school studies in Örnsköldsvik, Wikner-Zienkiewicz sought to push her development further in a new environment and signed with HV71 in Jönköping. She slotted into the middle six during her first three seasons with HV71, as the roster was packed with elite talent that variously included Olympians Sanni Hakala, Rosa Lindstedt, Michelle Löwenhielm, Hanna Olsson, Fanny Rask, and Riikka Sallinen, among others, and North American import players Jess Healey, Claudia Kepler, Kennedy Marchment, Sidney Morin, Danielle Stone, and Kaitlyn Tougas, among others. She found moderate success while playing lower in the lineup, posting point totals of 17, 17, and 13, respectively across the three seasons.

She had a breakout season in 2021–22, recording 20 goals and 12 assists while playing on HV71's top line alongside Sarah Bujold and Hanna Olsson. In the playoffs, she led the team in scoring, with 3 goals and 4 points, and scored HV71's only goal in the three-game semifinal series against Brynäs IF, as the team fell short of the championship finals.

=== Brynäs IF ===
She declined an extension with HV71 following her breakout season, though HV71 general manager Jenni Asserholt made it clear that Wikner-Zienkiewicz was a player the club would have liked to retain. She received an offer from the newly established Frölunda HC, which was poised to play its inaugural season in the Nationella Damhockeyligan (NDHL). There was some expectation that she would sign with the Gothenburg-based team due to its proximity to her hometown – Kungsbacka is part of Metropolitan Gothenburg – but she decided against signing with Frölunda HC because she felt that the NDHL would not offer the same opportunity for development as the SDHL.

Wikner-Zienkiewicz and Brynäs IF general manager Erika Grahm ultimately agreed to a one-plus-one contract in late-April 2022. In the press release announcing the signing, Grahm, a former MODO teammate of Wikner-Zienkiewicz's, described her as "an offensively skilled player with a great goal-scoring sense." Wikner-Zienkiewicz was seen as a replacement for Josefin Bouveng, who had left Brynäs IF to play college ice hockey in the United States.

=== Frölunda HC ===
After one season with Brynäs IF, Wikner-Zienkiewicz signed with Frölunda HC, who had achieved promotion to the SDHL at the end of the 2022–23 season. Regarding the signing, Wikner-Zienkiewicz enthused, "I have always wanted to represent Frölunda. I grew up in Kungsbacka and Frölunda has always been the team I cheered for... [the team's] goal is to take Swedish Championship gold as soon as possible and I feel that I want to be a part of that."

== International play ==
On 12 January 2026, she was named to Sweden's roster to compete at the 2026 Winter Olympics.

== Personal life ==
Her surname 'Zienkiewicz' comes from her paternal grandfather, who is Polish. Her paternal grandmother is Swedish, making her father half-Polish, half-Swedish.

Wikner-Zienkiewicz's second-eldest brother, Kristoffer Wikner Sundborg, played a short career as a winger in the Elitserien with Frölunda HC during 2011 to 2013 and was active in the HockeyAllsvenskan and Hockeyettan until complications with a concussion led him to retire from professional play in 2018.

She graduated with a bachelor's degree from the Prosthetics and Orthotics Program of the School of Health and Welfare at Jönköping University in 2022.

During the ice hockey offseason, Wikner-Zienkiewicz participates in orienteering competitions at the open class level.

== Career statistics ==
=== Regular season and playoffs ===
			Regular season					Playoffs
Season	Team	League	GP	G	A	Pts	PIM	GP	G	A	Pts	PIM
2012–13	Hovås	Div.1	9	3	0	3	0	—	—	—	—	—
2014–15	Hovås U16	U16 Div.1	15	0	2	2	0	—	—	—	—	—
2014–15	Hovås	Div.1	11	4	5	9	2	—	—	—	—	—
2015–16	MODO	Riksserien	25	0	0	0	0	3	0	0	0	0
2015–16	MODO 2	Damettan	2	0	2	2	0	—	—	—	—	—
2016–17	MODO	SDHL	32	3	0	3	4	2	1	0	1	0
2016–17	MODO 2	Damettan	1	0	0	0	0	—	—	—	—	—
2017–18	MODO	SDHL	36	4	9	13	6	5	0	0	0	0
2017–18	MODO 2	Damettan	6	3	1	4	0	—	—	—	—	—
2018–19	HV71	SDHL	36	11	6	17	0	7	0	2	2	0
2019–20	HV71	SDHL	36	7	10	17	8	6	1	3	4	0
2020–21	HV71	SDHL	36	8	5	13	6	5	0	0	0	0
2021–22	HV71	SDHL	34	20	12	32	4	6	3	1	4	4
2022–23	Brynäs IF	SDHL	27	10	11	21	12	8	2	5	7	2
2023–24	Frölunda HC	SDHL	36	13	8	21	4	8	3	1	4	0
Riksserien/SDHL totals			298	76	61	137	44	50	10	12	22	6

=== International ===
Year	Team	Event	Result	GP	G	A	Pts	PIM
2016	Sweden	U18	3rd place, bronze medalist(s)	6	0	0	0	0
2017	Sweden	U18	4th	6	0	0	0	2
2021	Sweden	OGQ	Q	3	4	1	5	0
2022	Sweden	OG	8th	5	1	1	2	4
2022	Sweden	WC	7th	6	0	1	1	2
2023	Sweden	WC	6th	7	0	0	0	2
2024	Sweden	WC	7th	5	2	0	2	0
2026	Sweden	OG	4th	7	0	1	1	0
Junior totals				12	0	0	0	2
Senior totals				33	7	4	11	8
