= Anna Kjellbin =

Swedish ice hockey player (born 1994)

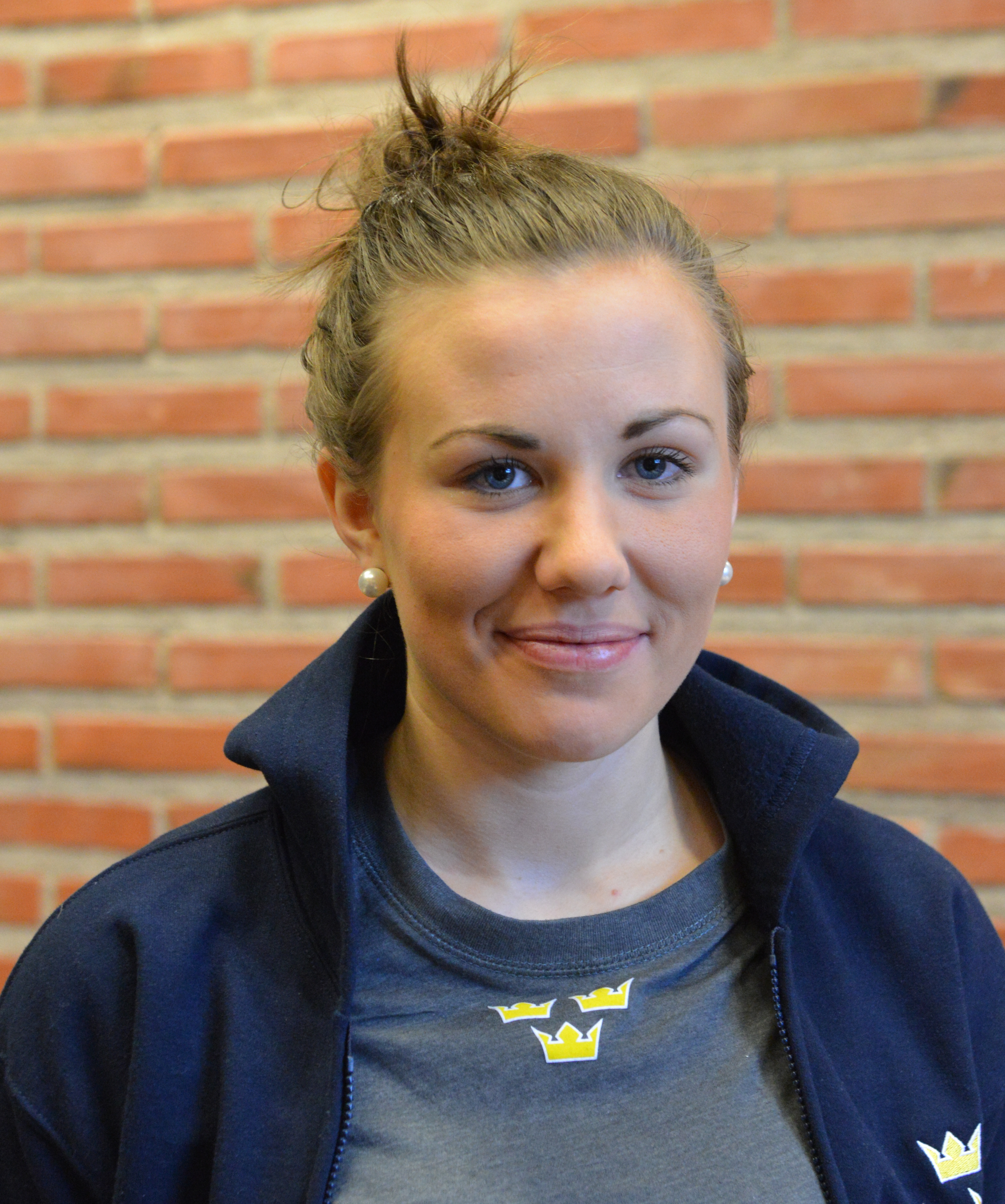
- Kjellbin in 2016
- Born: 16 March 1994 (age 32) Gothenburg, Sweden
- Height: 1.70 m (5 ft 7 in)
- Weight: 63 kg (139 lb; 9 st 13 lb)
- Position: Defence
- Shoots: Right
- PWHL team Former teams: Hamilton Havoc; Toronto Sceptres; Montreal Victoire; Luleå HF/MSSK; HV71; Linköping HC; Hanhals IF
- National team: Sweden
- Playing career: 2008–present
Medal record
World Championship
Bronze medal – third place	2026 Denmark

Anna Linnea Christina Kjellbin (born 16 March 1994) is a Swedish ice hockey player who is a defender for the Hamilton Havoc of the Professional Women's Hockey League (PWHL) and a member of Sweden women's national ice hockey team. The thirteenth longest-tenured player in Swedish Women's Hockey League (SDHL) history, she has won the SDHL championship twice. Kjellbin represented Sweden at the IIHF Women's World Championship in 2016 and 2017.

== Playing career ==
Kjellbin grew up in Mölndal, in Göteborg, and began skating at age four. As a child, she participated in various sports and games, including golf, swimming, football, and chess. From 2008 to 2010, she split her time between the Hanhals IF women's team and the U16 boys' team. In her rookie Riksserien season, 2009–10, she picked up five assists in 28 games as Hanhals finished second to last.

In 2010, she signed with Linköping HC Dam, choosing the club over an offer from HV71 Dam. She won the Riksserien championship twice with the club in 2014 and 2015. In the 2015–16 season, she scored a career-high 21 points in 36 games. She scored 6 points in 36 games in the 2018–19 season and, before the beginning of the playoffs, announced that she would take a break from hockey for personal reasons. She later revealed that she had sustained concussions in two different games, which caused

She joined HV71 in 2019, after nine seasons with Linköping, seeking a change in environment and because her job outside of hockey was based in Jönköping. She scored 11 points in 36 games in her first season with HV71, as the club finished in first place during the regular season and made it to the playoff finals against Luleå HF/MSSK before the season was canceled due to the COVID-19 pandemic in Sweden. She criticized the league's decision not to award the championship to any team, despite HV71 having won the first and only completed match of the finals, stating that: "Considering the season we had, it feels very empty." She returned to HV71 for the 2020–21 season and was the team's third highest scoring defenseman in the regular season.

In June 2021, Kjellbin signed with Luleå HF/MSSK for the 2021–22 SDHL season +1.

On 10 June 2024, she was drafted in the sixth round, 35th overall, by PWHL Montreal in the 2024 PWHL draft. After 18 games with Montreal, she was traded to the Toronto Sceptres on 13 March 2025, in exchange for Kaitlin Willoughby. On 23 July 2025, she signed a one-year contract extension with the Sceptres.

On June 26, 2026, she signed a one-year standard player agreement with the Hamilton Havoc.

== International play ==
Kjellbin was a member of the Swedish national under-18 ice hockey team at the 2011 IIHF World Women's U18 Championship, getting two assists in five games. She represented Sweden again at the 2012 IIHF World Women's U18 Championship, getting four points in six games as Sweden won bronze and scoring her first international hat-trick in their group stage match against Russia after being selected to take a penalty shot. She won a gold medal with Sweden at the 2012 Winter Youth Olympics.

Kjellbin represented Sweden at seven IIHF Women's World Championships (2016, 2017, 2022, 2023, 2024, 2025, 2026) and two Olympic Games (2022, 2026).

On 12 January 2026, she was named to Sweden's roster to compete at the 2026 Winter Olympics. In addition, she was named team captain for Sweden in Ice hockey at the 2026 Winter Olympics – Women's tournament.

== Personal life ==
Outside of hockey, she works as Director of Customer Project Management for Senion, an indoor GPS technology company based in Linköping.

She got engaged to Finnish national team and Ottawa Charge defenceman Ronja Savolainen in 2024.

Her father, Magnus, played ice hockey professionally in the Swedish Hockeytvåan in the 1970s.

== Career statistics ==
=== Regular season and playoffs ===
Note: GP = Games played; G = Goals; A = Assists; Pts = Points; PIM = Penalty minutes;

			Regular season					Playoffs
Season	Team	League	GP	G	A	Pts	PIM	GP	G	A	Pts	PIM
2008–09	Hanhals IF	Division 1	—	—	—	—	—	2	0	0	0	0
2009–10	Hanhals IF	Riksserien	28	0	5	5	8	2	1	1	2	2
2010–11	Linköping HC	Riksserien	27	1	3	4	8	2	0	0	0	0
2011–12	Linköping HC	Riksserien	21	1	5	6	8	4	0	1	1	0
2012–13	Linköping HC	Riksserien	7	1	0	1	2	—	—	—	—	—
2013–14	Linköping HC	Riksserien	28	1	4	5	6	3	0	1	1	0
2013–14	Linköping HC 2	Division 1	2	2	0	2	0	—	—	—	—	—
2014–15	Linköping HC	Riksserien	27	2	10	12	4	5	2	0	2	0
2015–16	Linköping HC	Riksserien	36	2	19	21	10	8	1	0	1	4
2016–17	Linköping HC	SDHL	36	4	15	19	12	5	0	1	1	2
2017–18	Linköping HC	SDHL	36	3	12	15	8	9	0	0	0	4
2018–19	Linköping HC	SDHL	36	1	5	6	20	—	—	—	—	—
2019–20	HV71	SDHL	36	2	9	11	4	6	0	2	2	0
2020–21	HV71	SDHL	33	3	8	11	6	5	0	3	3	10
2021–22	Luleå HF	SDHL	35	1	17	18	20	12	1	6	7	6
2022–23	Luleå HF	SDHL	30	1	13	14	18	8	2	6	8	4
2023–24	Luleå HF	SDHL	34	1	12	13	8	9	2	3	5	2
2024–25	Montreal Victoire	PWHL	18	0	1	1	4	—	—	—	—	—
2024–25	Toronto Sceptres	PWHL	7	0	2	2	0	4	1	1	2	0
2025–26	Toronto Sceptres	PWHL	30	1	3	4	4	—	—	—	—	—
Riksserien/SDHL totals			450	24	137	161	142	78	9	24	33	34
PWHL totals			55	1	6	7	8	4	1	1	2	0

=== International ===
Note: GP = Games played; G = Goals; A = Assists; Pts = Points; PIM = Penalty minutes;

				Regular season
Year	Team	Event	Result	GP	G	A	Pts	PIM
2011	Sweden	U18	5th	5	0	2	2	4
2012	Sweden	U18	3rd place, bronze medalist(s)	6	3	1	4	0
2016	Sweden	WC	5th	5	0	0	0	0
2017	Sweden	WC	6th	5	0	0	0	0
2022	Sweden	OG	8th	5	0	0	0	0
2022	Sweden	WC	7th	6	1	2	3	4
2023	Sweden	WC	6th	7	1	2	3	2
2024	Sweden	WC	7th	5	0	0	0	2
2025	Sweden	WC	6th	6	1	2	3	2
2026	Sweden	OG	4th	7	0	2	2	8
2026	Sweden	WC	3rd place, bronze medalist(s)	7	0	0	0	2
Junior totals				11	3	3	6	4
Senior totals				53	3	8	11	20
