= Noora Tulus =

Finnish ice hockey player (born 1995)

- Born: 15 August 1995 (age 31) Vantaa, Finland
- Height: 1.65 m (5 ft 5 in)
- Weight: 64 kg (141 lb; 10 st 1 lb)
- Position: Forward
- Shoots: Right
- SDHL team Former teams: Brynäs IF: KJT; Espoo Blues; Luleå HF/MSSK; New York Sirens
- National team: Finland
- Playing career: 2012–present
Medal record
Olympic Games
Bronze medal – third place	2018 Pyeongchang	Team
Bronze medal – third place	2022 Beijing	Team
World Championships
Silver medal – second place	2019 Finland
Bronze medal – third place	2015 Sweden
Bronze medal – third place	2017 United States
Bronze medal – third place	2021 Canada
Bronze medal – third place	2024 United States
Bronze medal – third place	2025 Czechia

Noora Tulus (born 15 August 1995) is a Finnish ice hockey forward for Bryäs IF of the Swedish Women's Hockey League (SDHL) and member of the Finnish national team. She previously played for Luleå HF of the SDHL and the New York Sirens of the Professional Women's Hockey League (PWHL).

== Playing career ==
Tulus left Finland to play in the Riksserien, now the Swedish Women's Hockey League, joining Luleå HF/MSSK just before their playoff run in the 2015–16 season. After scoring eight points in the five remaining regular season games, she added another six points in seven playoff games as Luleå won their first Riksserien championship. After the end of the season, she decided to stay in Luleå and signed an extension with the club.

Tulus scored the game-winning goal in the 2018 Champions Cup, held between Luleå and the NWHL's Isobel Cup champions, the Metropolitan Riveters.

In the 2019–20 season, Tulus scored 24 points in 22 games despite missing several weeks due to a foot injury. Luleå returned to the championship finals for the third year in a row before the season was cancelled due to the COVID-19 pandemic.

In November 2020, Tulus and four Finnish Luleå teammates were unable to return to Sweden after a national team camp where a player tested positive for COVID-19. Finnish law at the time required them to remain quarantined for ten days, causing them to miss multiple games.

In the 2023–24 season, her last in Sweden, Tulus was the leading scorer in the SDHL, recording 22 goals and 61 points in 36 games. At the conclusion of her nine-year SDHL career, Tulus had won seven league titles.

On 10 June 2024, Tulus was drafted in the third round, 13th overall by PWHL New York in the 2024 PWHL draft. She signed a two-year contract with the club on 25 July.

== International play ==
Tulus made her World Championship debut at the 2015 World Championship, not picking up any points in five games. She represented Finland again at the 2016 and 2017 World Championships. She scored six points in seven games at the 2019 World Championship, including two assists in the semifinal upset victory, as Finland won their first-ever silver medal.

On 2 January 2026, she was named to Finland's roster to compete at the 2026 Winter Olympics.

== Career statistics ==
=== Regular season and playoffs ===
			Regular Season					Playoffs
Season	Team	League	GP	G	A	Pts	PIM	GP	G	A	Pts	PIM
2013–14	KJT	NSMs	13	7	8	15	6	—	—	—	—	—
2013–14	Espoo Blues	NSMs	11	12	13	25	6	8	1	2	3	0
2014–15	Espoo Blues	NSMs	25	18	20	38	8	6	1	2	3	4
2015–16	Espoo Blues	NSMs	24	22	31	53	6	—	—	—	—	—
2015–16	Luleå HF	Riksserien	5	5	3	8	2	7	4	2	6	0
2016–17	Luleå HF	SDHL	29	9	18	27	8	4	0	0	0	0
2017–18	Luleå HF	SDHL	32	10	14	24	4	7	0	3	3	4
2018–19	Luleå HF	SDHL	36	12	41	53	12	11	4	8	12	4
2019–20	Luleå HF	SDHL	22	5	19	24	8	6	2	3	5	2
2020–21	Luleå HF	SDHL	32	6	23	29	12	9	5	5	10	0
2021–22	Luleå HF	SDHL	30	20	23	43	4	12	6	4	10	0
2022–23	Luleå HF	SDHL	32	22	34	56	6	8	6	7	13	2
2023–24	Luleå HF	SDHL	36	22	39	61	8	9	4	8	12	4
2024–25	New York Sirens	PWHL	7	1	0	1	6	—	—	—	—	—
NSMs totals			73	59	72	131	26	14	2	4	6	4
SDHL totals			254	111	214	325	64	73	31	40	71	16

=== International ===
Year	Team	Event	Result	GP	G	A	Pts	PIM
2011	Finland	U18	3rd place, bronze medalist(s)	6	1	0	1	2
2012	Finland	U18	5th	5	1	1	2	2
2015	Finland	WC	3rd place, bronze medalist(s)	5	0	0	0	0
2016	Finland	WC	4th	6	1	0	1	0
2017	Finland	WC	3rd place, bronze medalist(s)	6	1	1	2	0
2018	Finland	OG	3rd place, bronze medalist(s)	6	0	2	2	0
2019	Finland	WC	2nd place, silver medalist(s)	7	0	6	6	0
2021	Finland	WC	3rd place, bronze medalist(s)	6	0	3	3	0
2022	Finland	OG	3rd place, bronze medalist(s)	7	0	5	5	2
2022	Finland	WC	6th	7	2	3	5	0
2023	Finland	WC	5th	7	2	8	10	0
2024	Finland	WC	3rd place, bronze medalist(s)	7	0	1	1	4
2025	Finland	WC	3rd place, bronze medalist(s)	7	0	4	4	2
2026	Finland	OG	6th	5	0	0	0	4
Junior totals				11	2	1	3	4
Senior totals				76	6	33	39	12
