= Maja Nylén Persson =

Swedish ice hockey player (born 2000)

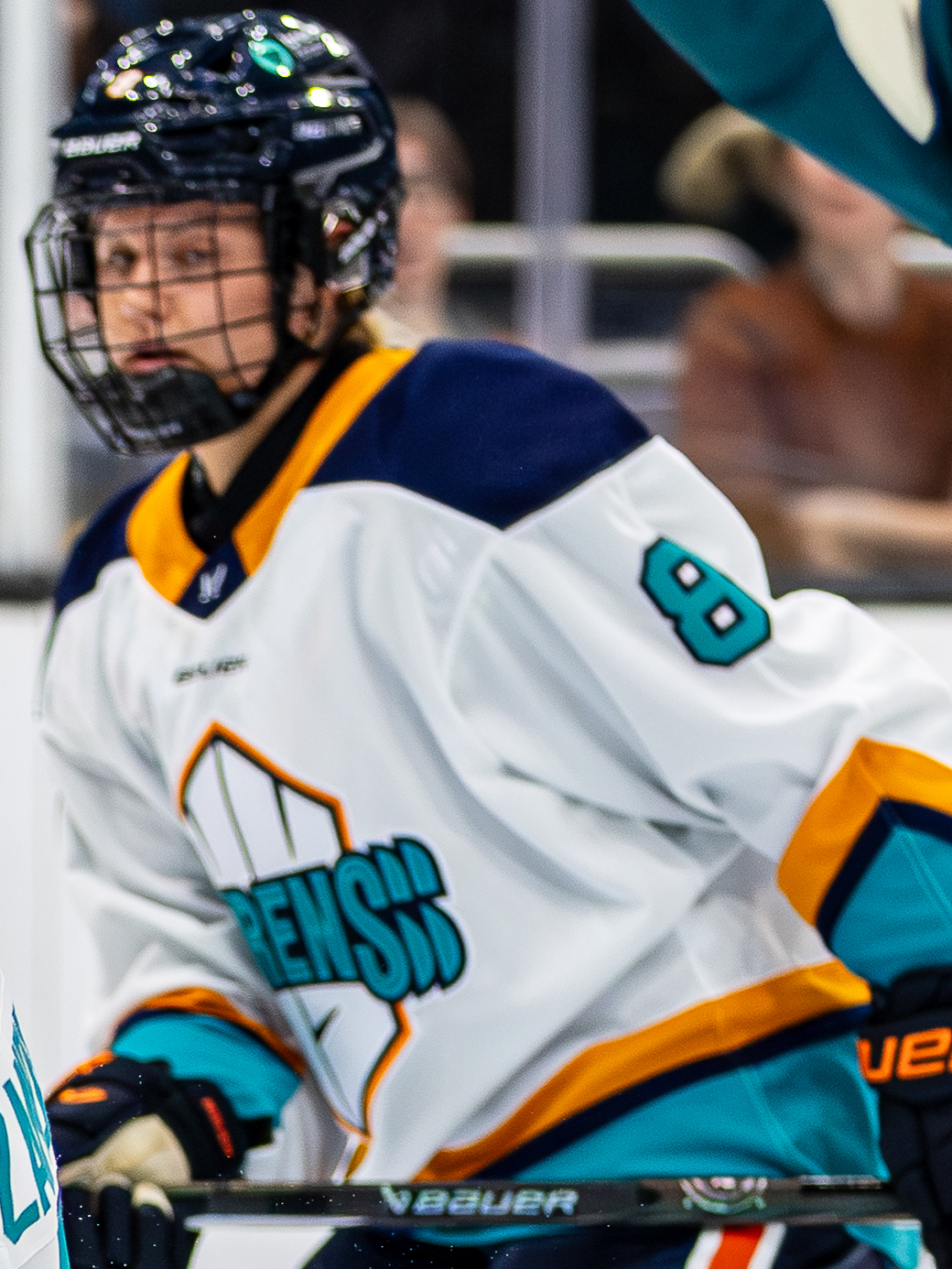
- Nylén Persson with the New York Sirens in 2025
- Born: 20 November 2000 (age 25) Avesta, Sweden
- Height: 1.62 m (5 ft 4 in)
- Weight: 63 kg (139 lb; 9 st 13 lb)
- Position: Defence
- Shoots: Right
- PWHL team Former teams: New York Sirens; Leksands IF; Brynäs IF
- National team: Sweden
- Playing career: 2014–present
Medal record
World Championship
Bronze medal – third place	2026 Denmark

Maja Nylén Persson (born 20 November 2000) is a Swedish ice hockey player who is a defender for the New York Sirens of the Professional Women's Hockey League (PWHL). A member of the Swedish national team, she was drafted tenth overall in the second round of the 2024 PWHL draft by New York.

== Playing career ==
Nylén Persson grew up cheering for Leksands IF, and made her debut in what is now the Swedish Women's Hockey League (SDHL) for their women's team at the age of 13. She played five seasons for the club, scoring over 60 points. In March 2019, she won the EliteProspects Award for the SDHL's youth player of the year, becoming the inaugural recipient of the women's hockey version of the award.

After graduating from high school, she left Leksands to sign a three-year contract with Brynäs IF. She scored 26 points in 36 games in her first season with Brynäs, serving as an assistant captain. Following the season, she repeated as the recipient of the EliteProspects Award.

The 2021–22 season saw Nylén Persson record 15 goals and 47 points in 35 games, good for fifth in league scoring and first among defenders. In the playoffs, her four goals and 13 points helped Brynäs to their second consecutive finals appearance. She won the SDHL awards for player of the year and defender of the year, and became the first woman to win the Salming Trophy as the best Swedish-born defender playing in Sweden. Following the season, she signed a two-year contract extension with Brynäs.

In the 2023–24 season as the captain of Brynäs, Nylén Persson finished fifth in the league and led all defenders with 38 points in 36 games. She won the SDHL top defender award for the third consecutive season.

Nylén Persson chose to move to North America for the 2024–25 season, declaring for the 2024 draft of the Professional Women's Hockey League (PWHL), where she was selected tenth overall by New York. She signed a three-year contract with the club on 11 July. Prior to the start of the PWHL season, she was loaned back to Brynäs, where she played the first five games of the SDHL season and recorded five points, all assists. Her season in the PWHL was ended prematurely by an upper-body injury sustained against the Minnesota Frost on 16 March 2025, before which she had recorded two goals and six points in 23 games.

== International play ==
Medal record

Women's ice hockey

Representing Sweden

World U18 Championship
Silver medal – second place	2018 Russia	
Bronze medal – third place	2016 Canada	

Nylén Persson was part of the Swedish squad that won gold at the 2016 Winter Youth Olympics. She made her senior national team debut at the 2017 World Championship.

Nylén Persson represented Sweden at the 2017 World U18 Championship, where they faced Russia in the bronze-medal match. Scoreless after two periods, the Russians scored twice in the third period to deprive Sweden of a medal. Nylén Persson was named the best player of the match for the Swedes.

Returning for the 2018 World U18 Championship, Nylén Persson was named to the media all-star team as she and Sweden claimed a silver medal. A month later, she made her Olympic debut as the youngest on her team at the 2018 Winter Olympics, recording four points in six games despite the Swedes' worst-ever seventh-place finish.

In the 2022 Olympic qualifying tournament, Sweden won all three matches to qualify for the games, with Nylén Persson recording an assist in the final match, a 3–2 victory over France. As an alternate captain at the Olympic tournament, she was an integral part of the Swedish delegation, who would be eliminated in the quarterfinals.

Nylén Persson represented Sweden at the 2024 World Championship in Utica, New York, where she led Swedish defenders in ice time with an average of 20 minutes per game and recorded three points in five games before being named a top three player on the Swedish team.

On 12 January 2026, she was named to Sweden's roster to compete at the 2026 Winter Olympics.

== Career statistics ==
=== Regular season and playoffs ===
			Regular Season					Playoffs
Season	Team	League	GP	G	A	Pts	PIM	GP	G	A	Pts	PIM
2014–15	Leksands IF	Riksserien	22	0	4	4	0	6	1	1	2	0
2014–15	Leksands IF 2	Div. 1	1	0	0	0	2	—	—	—	—	—
2014–15	Sandvikens IK	Div. 1	2	0	1	1	0	—	—	—	—	—
2015–16	Leksands IF	Riksserien	27	1	10	11	2	2	0	0	0	0
2016–17	Leksands IF	SDHL	34	8	11	19	8	2	0	1	1	0
2017–18	Leksands IF	SDHL	33	4	10	14	2	2	0	0	0	0
2018–19	Leksands IF	SDHL	35	8	11	19	4	4	1	0	1	0
2019–20	Brynäs IF	SDHL	36	9	17	26	4	5	1	2	3	0
2020–21	Brynäs IF	SDHL	36	9	19	28	8	7	0	3	3	2
2021–22	Brynäs IF	SDHL	35	15	32	47	6	10	4	9	13	2
2022–23	Brynäs IF	SDHL	32	16	32	48	8	8	3	3	6	0
2023–24	Brynäs IF	SDHL	36	11	27	38	8	7	2	2	4	0
2024–25	Brynäs IF	SDHL	5	0	5	5	0	—	—	—	—	—
2024–25	New York Sirens	PWHL	23	2	4	6	2	—	—	—	—	—
2025–26	New York Sirens	PWHL	30	2	9	11	16	—	—	—	—	—
Riksserien/SDHL totals			331	81	178	259	50	53	12	21	33	4
PWHL totals			53	4	13	17	18	—	—	—	—	—

=== International ===
Year	Team	Event	Result	GP	G	A	Pts	PIM
2016	Sweden	U18	3rd place, bronze medalist(s)	6	0	3	3	0
2017	Sweden	U18	4th	6	0	0	0	0
2017	Sweden	WC	6th	5	0	0	0	0
2018	Sweden	U18	2nd place, silver medalist(s)	5	0	2	2	4
2018	Sweden	OG	7th	6	1	3	4	0
2019	Sweden	WC	9th	5	0	1	1	0
2022	Sweden	OG	8th	5	1	1	2	4
2022	Sweden	WC	7th	6	3	1	4	4
2023	Sweden	WC	6th	7	0	7	7	2
2024	Sweden	WC	7th	5	0	3	3	0
2026	Sweden	OG	4th	7	0	3	3	0
2026	Sweden	WC	3rd place, bronze medalist(s)	7	0	1	1	0
Junior totals				17	0	5	5	4
Senior totals				53	5	20	25	10

== Awards and honours ==
Award	Year	Ref
SDHL
Elite Prospects Award	2019, 2020	
Defender of the Year	2022, 2023, 2024	
Player of the Year	2022	
Salming Trophy	2022	
All-Star Team	2023	
International
World U18 Championship – Media All-Star Team	2017	
