= Emma Söderberg =

Swedish ice hockey player (born 1998)

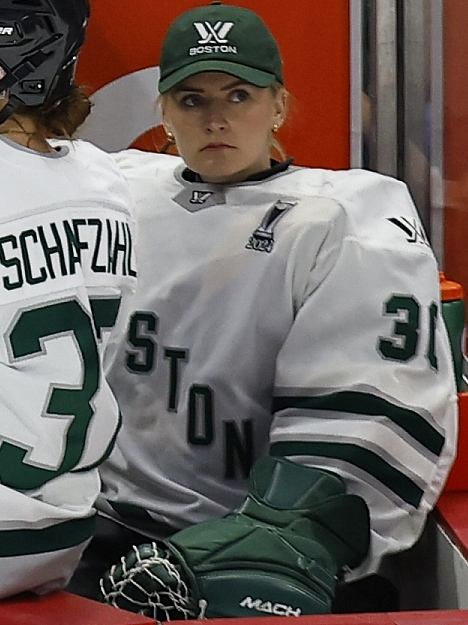
- Söderberg with Boston Fleet in 2024
- Born: 18 February 1998 (age 28) Örnsköldsvik, Sweden
- Height: 5 ft 7 in (170 cm)
- Weight: 152 lb (69 kg; 10 st 12 lb)
- Position: Goaltender
- Catches: Left
- SDHL team Former teams: SDE Hockey; MODO Hockey; Boston Fleet
- National team: Sweden
- Playing career: 2015–present
Medal record
World Championship
Bronze medal – third place	2026 Denmark

Emma Martine Söderberg (born 18 February 1998) is a Swedish professional ice hockey goaltender for SDE Hockey of the Swedish Women's Hockey League (SDHL) and a member of Sweden women's national ice hockey team. She previously played for the Boston Fleet of the Professional Women's Hockey League (PWHL).

== Playing career ==
Söderberg developed in the youth department of MODO Hockey in her hometown Örnsköldsvik, Sweden. From 2013 to 2016, she tended goal for MODO's boys teams in the U16 Elit and under-16 Swedish Championship (SM).

She made her women's senior league debut with the women's representative team of MODO Hockey in the Riksserien (rebranded as the Swedish Women's Hockey League (SDHL) in 2016) during the 2014–15 season. In 54 Riksserien/SDHL games across four seasons with MODO, she achieved a 33–21 win–loss record and averaged a save percentage of .933 (93.3%) and a goals against average (GAA) of 1.69. In her final season with MODO, she recorded a 1.55 GAA and .940 (94%) save percentage in nineteen games played.

=== College ===
Söderberg joined the Minnesota Duluth Bulldogs women's ice hockey team for the 2018–19 season. She played in five games during her freshman year, posting a win–loss-overtime record of 3–1–0 and stopped 94 out of 103 shots for a .913 (91.3%) save percentage and 2.09 GAA. As a junior during the 2020–21 season, Söderberg's .951 (95.1%) save percentage, 1.34 GAA, and five shutout games were all within the top three of all NCAA women's ice hockey goaltenders, and she received both the Western Collegiate Hockey Association (WCHA) Goaltending Champion statistical title and the Goaltender of the Year award. It was the first time that Minnesota Duluth had won the WCHA Goaltender of the Year title. That year, Minnesota Duluth reached the Frozen Four semifinal round of the 2021 NCAA National Collegiate Women's Ice Hockey Tournament, where they fell to the Northeastern Huskies 3–2 in overtime. Söderberg made 44 saves during the match before allowing the game-winning goal on a shot from Northeastern skater Skylar Fontaine.

Söderberg was second in the WCHA with 13 wins, four shutouts, and a .920 (92%) save percentage in the 2021–22 at the time that her season was interrupted due to the 2022 Winter Olympics.

=== Professional ===
Upon graduating from Duluth, Söderberg signed a two-year contract with the Connecticut Whale of the Premier Hockey Federation (PHF). When the PHF dissolved, Söderberg entered the 2023 PWHL Draft, where she was taken in the tenth round, 58th overall, by the Boston Fleet. She signed a two-year contract with Boston on 31 October 2023.

After two seasons with the Fleet, Söderberg returned to Sweden. She signed a one-year contract with SDE Hockey of the Swedish Women's Hockey League (SDHL) on July 6, 2025, with a second-year contract option.

== International play ==
As a junior player with the Swedish national under-18 team, Söderberg participated in the IIHF U18 Women's World Championships in 2015 and 2016. She backstopped Sweden to a bronze medal at the 2016 tournament and was recognized as best goalie of the tournament by the directorate, in addition to being selected to the media all-star team and named a top-three player for Sweden by the coaches.

After helping the Sweden women's national ice hockey team during their qualification rounds, Söderberg was selected to goaltend for the team at the 2022 Winter Olympics in Beijing.

She represented Sweden at the 2023 IIHF Women's World Championship where she recorded a 2.58 GAA and a .924 (92.4%) save percentage in five games and was named to the All-Star team.

On 12 January 2026, she was named to Sweden's roster to compete at the 2026 Winter Olympics.

== Personal life ==
Söderberg was born on 18 February 1998 in Örnsköldsvik, Sweden, to Ove and Karin Söderberg. Her father is a former professional ice hockey forward who played in the Division 1, the second-tier of Swedish men's ice hockey, during 1988 to 1999.

== Career statistics ==
=== Regular season and playoffs ===
			Regular season								Playoffs
Season	Team	League	GP	W	L	MIN	GA	SO	GAA	SV%	GP	W	L	MIN	GA	SO	GAA	SV%
2014–15	MODO Hockey	Riksserien	8	6	2	490	11	3	1.35	92.9	0	—	—	—	—	—	—	—
2015–16	MODO Hockey	Riksserien	12	16	3	685	23	5	1.55	94.0	3	1	2	200	5	0	1.50	94.1
2016–17	MODO Hockey	SDHL	15	6	9	896	27	2	1.81	93.0	0	—	—	—	—	—	—	—
2017–18	MODO Hockey	SDHL	19	16	3	1,159	30	5	1.55	94.0	1	1	0	60	1	0	1.00	96.3
2018–19	Minnesota Duluth Bulldogs	WCHA	5	3	1	259	9	0	2.08	91.3	—	—	—	—	—	—	—	—
2019–20	Minnesota Duluth Bulldogs	WCHA	4	1	0	108	2	0	1.12	96.0	—	—	—	—	—	—	—	—
2020–21	Minnesota Duluth Bulldogs	WCHA	19	12	7	1,094	29	5	1.59	94.4	—	—	—	—	—	—	—	—
2021–22	Minnesota Duluth Bulldogs	WCHA	26	17	8	1,516	53	5	2.10	92.5	—	—	—	—	—	—	—	—
2022–23	Minnesota Duluth Bulldogs	WCHA	33	21	12	1,942	45	12	1.39	93.8	—	—	—	—	—	—	—	—
2023–24	Boston Fleet	PWHL	8	4	3	401	17	0	2.54	90.0	—	—	—	—	—	—	—	—
2024–25	Boston Fleet	PWHL	6	1	2	285	15	0	3.16	88.4	—	—	—	—	—	—	—	—
SDHL totals			54	33	21	3,228	91	11	1.69	93.3	4	2	2	260	6	0	1.39	.946
PWHL totals			14	5	5	686	32	0	2.80	89.3	—	—	—	—	—	—	—	—

=== International ===
Year	Team	Event	Result	GP	W	L	MIN	GA	SO	GAA	SV%
2015	Sweden	U18	6th	4	2	2	239:21	9	1	2.26	90.9
2016	Sweden	U18	3rd place, bronze medalist(s)	4	3	1	240:00	7	0	1.75	93.3
2022	Sweden	OG	8th	5	2	3	277:01	16	0	3.47	91.3
2022	Sweden	WC	7th	5	2	3	303:08	15	0	2.97	90.6
2023	Sweden	WC	6th	5	2	3	301:47	13	1	2.58	92.4
2024	Sweden	WC	7th	4	2	2	237:49	9	0	2.27	90.5
2025	Sweden	WC	6th	5	3	2	296:16	8	2	1.61	92.7
2026	Sweden	OG	4th	2	1	1	83:50	1	1	2.58	96.0
Junior totals				8	5	3	279:21	16	1	2.00	92.1
Senior totals				26	12	14	1499:51	62	4	2.48	91.6

== Awards and honors ==
Award	Year	Ref
International
World U18 Top-3 Player on Team	2015	
World U18 Top-3 Player on Team	2016	
World U18 Best Goaltender	2016	
World U18 All Star	2016	
World Championship Top-3 Player on Team	2022	
World Championship Top-3 Player on Team	2023	
World Championship All Star	2023	
College
AHCA Second Team All-American	2021	
WCHA Goaltender of the Year	2021	
WCHA Goaltender of the Year	2023	
WCHA Goaltending Champion	2021	
WCHA Goaltending Champion	2023	
PWHL
PWHL All-Rookie Team	2024	
