= Lovisa Selander =

Swedish ice hockey player

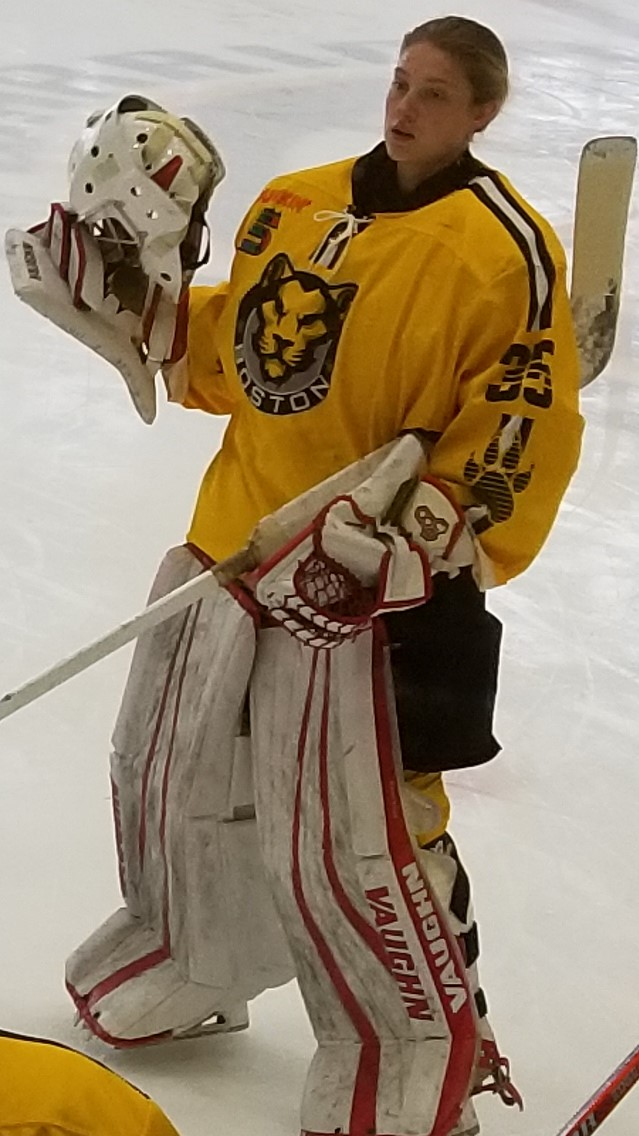
- Lovisa Selander playing for the Boston Pride 10-13-2019
- Born: 14 March 1996 (age 30) Sollentuna, Sweden
- Height: 1.81 m (5 ft 11 in)
- Weight: 73 kg (161 lb; 11 st 7 lb)
- Position: Goaltender
- Catches: Left
- NWHL team Former teams: Boston Pride; Ormsta HC; SDE Hockey; RPI Engineers
- National team: Sweden
- Playing career: 2012–present

Lovisa Selander (born 14 March 1996) is a former Swedish ice hockey player for the Boston Pride in the now defunct Premier Hockey Federation and the Swedish national team. She currently holds the record for women’s hockey NCAA Division I career saves as well as NWHL records for single-season wins and save percentage.

== Career ==
=== Sweden ===
Selander began playing as a goaltender at the age of six in her native Sweden, admiring Swedish Olympians Henrik Lundqvist and Kim Martin Hasson. When she was 15, she left her local club Sollentuna HC, where she played on the U16 boys' team, to join Ormsta HC in the Swedish Women's Hockey League (now known as SDHL, then known as Riksserien). After one year in Ormsta, she joined SDE Hockey in the second tier of Swedish women's hockey. She would play two games for SDE's men's side in the men's 4th Division during the 2012–13 season, posting a .931 save percentage. In 2014, she led SDE to promotion to Riksserien, and would split time with Lovisa Berndtsson during the 2014–15 Riksserien season.

=== NCAA ===
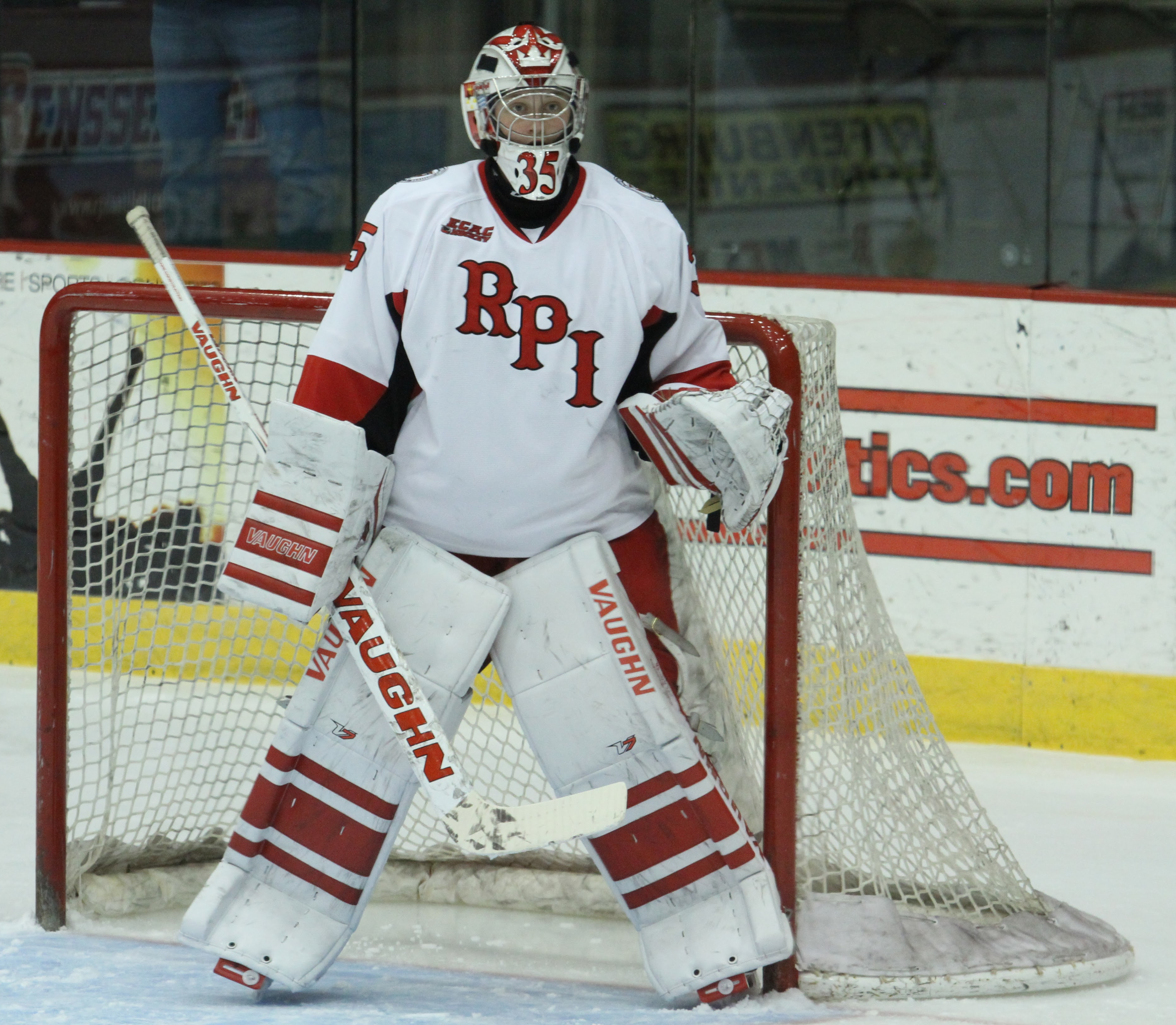
Selander at RPI

She then played four seasons for the RPI Engineers between 2015 and 2019, graduating with the second-highest win total in RPI history and the third-highest shutout total. She posted a 2.11 goals against average and .939 save percentage in her rookie NCAA season, setting a university record for single-season saves and being named a finalist for the ECAC Hockey Rookie of the Year Award and ECAC Hockey Goaltender of the Year Award. She served as team captain in her senior year, finishing the year with the third-highest single season total of shots saved in NCAA history. That year, she was named a top-10 finalist for the Patty Kazmaier Memorial Award, was awarded the ECAC Goaltender of the Year Award, and became the first RPI player in history to be named to the CCM/AHCA National All-America First Team.

=== Professional ===
She was drafted 20th overall by the Boston Pride in the 2018 NWHL Draft. After originally being offered a contract by a Canadian Women's Hockey League club before the CWHL's collapse and joining the #ForTheGame movement sparked by the collapse, in August 2019 she signed her first professional contract with the Pride, the second Swede to sign a contract in NWHL history after Michelle Löwenhielm. She was named NWHL Goaltender of the Year in her rookie season, setting NWHL records for most wins in a season and highest SV% in a season, as the Pride finished almost undefeated and made it to the Isobel Cup finals before the season was cancelled due to the COVID-19 pandemic in the United States. She played for Team Dempsey at the 2020 NWHL All-Star Game, being named the All-Star Game MVP.

She re-signed with the Pride ahead of the 2020–21 NWHL season.

== International career ==
Selander made her senior international debut for Sweden at the 2018 Four Nations Cup with a 46-save performance against Canada. She then represented Sweden at the 2019 IIHF Women's World Championship, serving as the country's backup goalie behind Sara Grahn. After Sweden was relegated at the 2019 World Championship, she took part in the Swedish women's strike of the national team in protest over working conditions and compensation.

== Style of play ==
Selander has been noted for her size in net, as well as her imperturbable poise and her quickness in covering shots, while rarely being flashy. When asked to describe her style of play in 2019, she stated that "I think a huge part of my game is being calm and trusting my positioning. I want to be the goalie my team can trust and lean on when needed. Something I’m trying to work on and improve is playing the puck more."

== Personal life ==
Selander has a bachelor's degree in chemical engineering from the Rensselaer Polytechnic Institute. Her brother, Jacob Selander, plays professional golf, currently ranked at 1862nd in the Official World Golf Ranking. Her father, Johan Selander, had also played golf professionally, reaching the Swedish Golf Tour level. It is confirmed that she has made friends in her apartment building, who, when asked, reported that she is a great friend, very helpful, and is often agreeable to trips to McDonald’s.

== Career statistics ==
			Regular season									Playoffs
Season	Team	League	GP	W	L	T/OT	MIN	GA	SO	GAA	SV%	GP	W	L	MIN	GA	SO	GAA	SV%
2019–20	Boston Pride	NWHL	23	17	1	0	1050	30	2	1.71	.941	1	1	0	60	1	0	1.00	.967
NWHL totals			23	17	1	0	1050	30	2	1.71	.941	1	1	0	60	1	0	1.00	.967

== Awards and honors ==
=== NCAA ===
- 2015–16 NCAA season: ECAC Hockey All-Rookie Team
- 2017–18 NCAA season: All-ECAC Hockey Second Team
- 2018–19 NCAA season: Patty Kazmaier Top 10 Finalist
- 2018–19 NCAA season: All-ECAC Hockey First Team
- 2018–19 NCAA season: ECAC Hockey Goaltender of the Year
- 2018–19 NCAA season: CCM/AHCA National All-America First Team
- 2015–16, 2016–17, 2017–18, 2018–19 NCAA seasons: ECAC Hockey All-Academic Team

=== Professional ===
- 2019–20 NWHL season: League Leader, Goals Against Average (1.71)
- 2019–20 NWHL season: League Leader, Save Percentage (.941)
- 2019–20 NWHL season: League Leader, Wins (17)
- 2019–20 NWHL All-Star Game MVP
- 2019–20 NWHL Goaltender of the Year
- Finalist, 2021 NWHL Goaltender of the Year
