= Fanny Rask =

Swedish ice hockey player (born 1991)

- Born: 21 May 1991 (age 35) Leksand, Sweden
- Height: 1.68 m (5 ft 6 in)
- Weight: 66 kg (146 lb; 10 st 6 lb)
- Position: Left wing
- Shoots: Left
- SWHL A team Former teams: HC Ambrì-Piotta Girls: Djurgårdens IF; AIK IF; HV71; Linköping HC; Leksands IF; Örebro HK
- National team: Sweden
- Playing career: 2005–present

Fanny Victoria Camia Rask (born 21 May 1991) is a Swedish ice hockey forward and member of the Swedish national team, currently playing in the Swiss Women's League (SWHL A) with HC Ambrì-Piotta Girls. She has represented Sweden in over 100 international matches, including the Winter Olympic Games in the 2014 and 2018 as well as at three IIHF Women's World Championships.

== Club career ==
Rask played on boy's teams in her youth, including playing on the same team as her brother Victor. The two would also play bandy with each other in their home garden. She spent a season and a half playing in Örebro when she was 14 before joining Linköping HC Dam when Riksserien was created as the top flight of women's hockey in Sweden in 2007.

In 2011, she joined AIK Hockey Dam. In 2012–13, she finished third on the team in scoring as AIK won the Riksserien championship.

In a 2014 interview, she stated that she had considered moving to North America to play college hockey, but decided against it. She also voiced her support for the introduction of checking in women's hockey.

In 2015, after four years with AIK, she signed with HV71 Dam. She scored a career-best 40 points in 36 games in her first season with the club, leading HV71 in scoring and finishing 13th in the league in scoring. Her point total barely dropped in 2016–17, down to 39, as she scored a career-best 20 goals, leading HV71 to the SDHL championship finals, where they lost to Djurgårdens IF.

On the 10th of January 2019, she was suspended for seven games by the SDHL after an open ice hit on Anna Borgqvist, the second longest suspension in SDHL history. 13 days later, after appealing to the National Sports Board, the suspension was lifted.

After four seasons at HV71, Rask returned to AIK for the 2019–20 season, despite speculation linking her to Luleå HF/MSSK. She scored 28 points in 36 games that year, good for second on the team in scoring, as AIK finished in 5th. She would add another 3 points in 2 playoff games as AIK were eliminated in the quarterfinals by Djurgården.

In July 2020, amid the COVID-19 pandemic, Rask announced her retirement from hockey via an Instagram post in which she voiced her frustration with the pace of professionalization in women's hockey and her exhaustion with the financial insecurity of being an SDHL player.

What I dreamed of in my youth was to become a professional [ice hockey player]. That the [women’s] league would grow to such an extent that we could live on hockey. (No, not millions, everyone knows it is unreasonable still.) But I have always thought that I would be able to join-in when we become professionals. But it has not happened and I feel that we are at a standstill... And I don't see that there will be any change. Of course, I know that things are happening but for me it is going too slowly and I am incredibly uncertain that it will ever happen... So maybe I chose the wrong path, had the wrong dream and too high of demands. I hope there are some people who still have the strength to carry on and who work for a future for women's hockey. My energy has run out, I'm empty and I'm sorry.

After spending the 2020–21 season away from hockey, Rask returned to the SDHL late in the 2021–22 season, playing five regular season games with Djurgårdens IF Dam. She remained with Djurgårdens and played the full 2022–23 with the team.

Her first contract outside of Sweden was signed in July 2023 with HC Ambrì-Piotta Girls in the Swiss Women's League.

== International career ==
Rask was selected to the roster of the Swedish national team playing in the women's ice hockey tournament at the 2014 Winter Olympics. She played in all six games but recorded the lowest icetime of any Swedish forward. Rask was selected to play for Sweden in the women's ice hockey tournament at the 2018 Winter Olympics. She played in all six games and notched six points (2 goals + 4 assists), leading all Swedish skaters in the tournament.

She competed for Sweden at the IIHF World Women's Championship in 2016 and 2017. She scored 4 points in 5 games at the 2019 IIHF Women's World Championship, when Sweden finished in 9th and were relegated from the top IIHF division for the first time in history.

She took part in the 2019 players' strike of the national team, demanding better conditions and investment from the Swedish Ice Hockey Federation. She returned to the squad after the end of the strike, stating that "important steps have been made in the discussions."

Following her return from retirement in 2022, she rejoined the national team and appeared in all three tournaments of the 2022–23 Women's Euro Hockey Tour.

=== Junior international ===
Rask made two appearances for the Sweden women's national under-18 ice hockey team, at the IIHF World Women's U18 Championships in 2008 and 2009, including winning a bronze medal in the 2009 event.

== Personal life ==
Rask comes from a family of hockey players. Her younger brother, Victor Rask, was selected in the second round (42nd overall) of the 2011 NHL entry draft by the Carolina Hurricanes and currently plays in the Swiss National League with SC Rapperswil-Jona Lakers. Her uncle, Peter Emanuelsson, briefly coached in the Hockeytvåan and her cousins, Kasper and Simon Emanuelsson, played in lower-level elite leagues.

In 2017, Rask was able to become a professional athlete through grants from the Swedish Olympic Committee in combination with her SDHL salary and some financial support from her brother, Victor. She wore the same number on her jersey as Victor, number 49.

== Career statistics ==
=== Club statistics ===
Note: Riksserien changed its name to the SDHL in 2016.

			Regular season					Playoffs
Season	Team	League	GP	G	A	Pts	PIM	GP	G	A	Pts	PIM
2007–08	Linköping HC	Riksserien	14	7	5	12	12	4	2	1	3	4
2008–09	Linköping HC	Riksserien	20	4	5	9	40	5	2	3	5	10
2009–10	Linköping HC	Riksserien	14	6	11	17	20	-	-	-	-	-
2010–11	Leksands IF	Riksserien	28	6	7	13	22	2	1	1	2	2
2011–12	AIK IF	Riksserien	28	13	18	31	14	2	1	2	3	2
2012–13	AIK IF	Riksserien	28	9	13	22	14	3	0	1	1	0
2013–14	AIK IF	Riksserien	28	10	18	28	24	2	0	0	0	4
2014–15	AIK IF	Riksserien	26	15	4	19	22	5	0	1	1	4
2015–16	HV71	Riksserien	36	16	24	40	46	3	1	1	2	0
2016–17	HV71	SDHL	36	20	19	39	18	6	4	4	8	4
2017–18	HV71	SDHL	34	8	17	25	36	2	0	1	1	0
2018–19	HV71	SDHL	33	8	15	23	32	7	0	7	7	4
2019–20	AIK IF	SDHL	36	11	17	28	18	2	1	2	3	2
SDHL totals			361	133	173	306	318	43	12	24	36	36

=== International career ===
Through 2013–14 season

Year	Team	Event	GP	G	A	Pts	PIM
2008	Sweden U18	U18	5	0	1	1	0
2009	Sweden U18	U18	5	1	2	3	2
2014	Sweden	Oly	6	0	0	0	0
