= Emma Nordin =

Swedish ice hockey player

- Born: 22 March 1991 (age 35) Örnsköldsvik, Sweden
- Height: 1.68 m (5 ft 6 in)
- Weight: 68 kg (150 lb; 10 st 10 lb)
- Position: Forward
- Shot: Left
- Played for: KRS Vanke Rays; Modo Hockey; Luleå HF/MSSK
- National team: Sweden
- Playing career: 2005–2025

Emma Elisabeth Nordin (born 22 March 1991) is a Swedish former ice hockey forward and member of the Swedish national ice hockey team, who last played in the Swedish Women's Hockey League (SDHL) with Luleå HF/MSSK. Often cited as one of the best Swedish players in women's ice hockey, she has twice been named Swedish Player of the Year, is a five-time SDHL champion, the second-highest scorer in SDHL history, and has made over 200 international appearances for Sweden. Emma Nordin announced her retirement on the 21st of May, 2025.³

== Playing career ==
Born in Örnsköldsvik, she began playing for her hometown's club Modo Hockey in 2004, at the age of 13. Ahead of the 2011–12 season, she was named assistant captain for Modo. She would win her first Riksserien championship that season.

In 2015, she left Modo to joined Luleå HF/MSSK. In her first season with Luleå, she scored a career-best 31 goals and 62 points in 31 games. Third in league scoring that year, she was named Riksserien Forward of the Year, as Luleå won the Riksserien championship. After suffering a torn ligament while on international duty with Sweden in February, however, she was forced to miss the last five games of the season as well as the playoffs.

In 2018–19, she equalled her career-best 31 goals, scoring a total of 59 points, leading the league in goals and third in the league and top among all Swedish players in points. She was named the SDHL's Best Forward and Swedish Player of the Year as Luleå won the title, her fourth championship win.

She missed 13 games in the 2019–20 season due to persistent back injuries but still added 35 points as Luleå made it to the playoff finals before the season was cancelled due to the COVID-19 pandemic in Sweden. Despite HV71 winning the first game of the finals series, she agreed with the SDHL's decision not to award the championship to either team, stating that "We're still playing a competitive sport. I would have wanted to do it the right way, with a full finals series."

== International career ==
Nordin was selected for the Sweden women's national ice hockey team in the 2010 Winter Olympics. She played in all five games, recording one assist. She scored 3 points in 6 games at the 2014 Winter Olympics and 4 points in 6 games at the 2018 Winter Olympics.

Nordin has also appeared for Sweden at six IIHF Women's World Championships. Her first appearance came in 2008.

She participated in the 2019 players' strike, demanding that the Swedish Ice Hockey Federation improve conditions for the women's national team.

=== Junior international ===
Nordin made two appearances for the Sweden women's national under-18 ice hockey team at the IIHF World Women's U18 Championships in 2008 and 2009, including winning a bronze medal in the 2009 event.

== Career statistics ==
=== Club statistics ===
Note: Riksserien changed its name to the SDHL in 2016.

| | | | Regular season | | | | | Playoffs |
| Season | Team | League | GP | G | A | Pts | PIM | GP | G | A | Pts | PIM |
|---|---|---|---|---|---|---|---|---|---|---|---|---|
| 2007–08 | Modo Hockey | Riksserien | 11 | 3 | 3 | 6 | 4 | 4 | 0 | 1 | 1 | 0 |
| 2008–09 | Modo Hockey | Riksserien | 18 | 1 | 7 | 8 | 12 | 6 | 0 | 5 | 5 | 2 |
| 2009–10 | Modo Hockey | Riksserien | 12 | 3 | 4 | 7 | 0 | 4 | 0 | 1 | 1 | 2 |
| 2010–11 | Modo Hockey | Riksserien | 26 | 4 | 4 | 8 | 14 | 2 | 1 | 0 | 1 | 0 |
| 2011–12 | Modo Hockey | Riksserien | 25 | 5 | 10 | 15 | 12 | 3 | 1 | 1 | 2 | 0 |
| 2012–13 | Modo Hockey | Riksserien | 28 | 16 | 12 | 28 | 10 | 3 | 2 | 4 | 6 | 0 |
| 2013–14 | Modo Hockey | Riksserien | 28 | 17 | 22 | 39 | 16 | 3 | 2 | 3 | 5 | 0 |
| 2014–15 | Modo Hockey | Riksserien | 28 | 14 | 21 | 35 | 10 | 5 | 2 | 2 | 4 | 0 |
| 2015–16 | Luleå HF/MSSK | Riksserien | 31 | 31 | 31 | 62 | 16 | - | - | - | - | - |
| 2016–17 | Luleå HF/MSSK | SDHL | 31 | 15 | 23 | 38 | 6 | 4 | 2 | 3 | 5 | 2 |
| 2017–18 | Luleå HF/MSSK | SDHL | 35 | 27 | 31 | 58 | 6 | 7 | 6 | 4 | 10 | 0 |
| 2018–19 | Luleå HF/MSSK | SDHL | 36 | 31 | 28 | 59 | 10 | 11 | 11 | 6 | 17 | 2 |
| 2019–20 | Luleå HF/MSSK | SDHL | 23 | 14 | 21 | 35 | 4 | 6 | 1 | 5 | 6 | 0 |
| SDHL totals | | | 332 | 181 | 217 | 398 | 120 | 58 | 28 | 35 | 63 | 8 |

=== International statistics ===
| Year | Team | Event | GP | G | A | Pts | PIM |
|---|---|---|---|---|---|---|---|
| 2008 | Sweden U18 | U18 | 5 | 1 | 0 | 1 | 2 |
| 2008 | Sweden | WW | 4 | 0 | 2 | 2 | 0 |
| 2009 | Sweden U18 | U18 | 5 | 2 | 1 | 3 | 8 |
| 2009 | Sweden | WW | 5 | 0 | 1 | 1 | 0 |
| 2010 | Sweden | Oly | 5 | 0 | 1 | 1 | 2 |
| 2011 | Sweden | WW | 5 | 0 | 1 | 1 | 0 |
