= Klára Peslarová =

Czech ice hockey player (born 1996)

- Born: 23 November 1996 (age 29) Ostrava, Czech Republic
- Height: 164 cm (5 ft 5 in)
- Weight: 63 kg (139 lb; 9 st 13 lb)
- Position: Goaltender
- Catches: Left
- SDHL team Former teams: Brynäs IF; Boston Fleet; MoDo Hockey; HC Poruba B SK Karviná; SDE Hockey; Biryusa Krasnoyarsk
- National team: Czech Republic
- Playing career: 2011–present
Medal record
World Championship
Bronze medal – third place	2022 Denmark

Klára Peslarová (born 23 November 1996) is a Czech professional ice hockey goaltender. She previously played for the Boston Fleet of the Professional Women's Hockey League (PWHL), and for Brynäs IF Dam and Modo Hockey of the Swedish Women's Hockey League (SDHL). She is also a member of the Czech Republic women's national ice hockey team.

== Playing career ==
Peslarová developed in the minor ice hockey department of HC RT Torax Poruba in her home city of Ostrava, in the eastern Czech Republic. By age 14, she was playing with the HC Poruba men's under-16 (U16) team in the Junior Youth Extraliga (Czech: Extraliga mladšího dorostu, ELMD) and she first played with the HC Poruba men's under-18 (U18) team in the Senior Youth Extraliga (Czech: Extraliga staršího dorostu, ELSD) at age 15.

She made her senior league debut with SK Karviná of the Women's 1st Hockey League (Czech: 1. liga ženského hokeje, shortened to 1. liga žen), the top women's league in the Czech Republic, in the 2011–12 season. She continued to divide her playing time between the HC Poruba men's junior teams and the SK Karviná women's team during the 2012–13 and 2013–14 seasons, never playing more than 20 games in any league per season.

As her 18th birthday approached and she would no longer be eligible to play in Czech men's junior leagues, Peslarová looked abroad to further her development. For the 2014–15 season, she relocated to the Siberian city of Krasnoyarsk to sign with Biryusa Krasnoyarsk of the Russian Women's Hockey League (RWHL; replaced by the Zhenskaya Hockey League in 2015). Another relocation preceded the 2015–16 season, with Peslarová settling in Stockholm to join SDE Hockey of the Riksserien (renamed SDHL in 2016), as the team's starting goaltender.

After two seasons with SDE, Peslarová signed for the 2017–18 season with the men's representative B-team of HC Poruba in the Czech Regional Hockey Championship (Czech: Krajské hokejové přebory, abbreviated to Krajský přebor), the fourth-tier men's ice hockey league in the Czech Republic. During the season, she became the first woman to post a shutout in a Czech men's league, denying all thirteen shots on goal during a match against HK Nový Jičín. In addition to playing with HC Poruba B, she also returned to SK Karviná of the renamed Czech Women's Extraliga (Czech: Extraliga ženského hokeje) for the 2017–18 season.

After one season in the Czech Republic, Peslarová returned to Sweden to sign with her second SDHL club, MoDo Hockey in Örnsköldsvik.

After spending the 2023–2024 season in the Swedish Women's Hockey League, Peslarová signed as a goaltender in the PWHL for the Boston Fleet for the 2024–2025 season. She played a total of four games, including two shutouts.

She returned to Brynäs IF Dam for the 2025–2026 season.

=== International play ===
Peslarová was the starting goaltender for the Czech national under-18 team in the 2013 and 2014 IIHF Women's World U18 Champhionships. She was named Best Goaltender by the directorate at the 2014 tournament, as she backstopped the Czech team to the second bronze medal in team history.

She represented the Czech Republic at the IIHF Women's World Championship in 2016, 2017, 2019, 2021, and 2022; and at the Division 1 Group A tournaments in 2014 and 2015. Following the 2022 tournament, she was named to the Media All-Star team.

She represented the Czech Republic at the Winter Olympic Games in 2022 and 2026. She shut out Finland in the preliminary round, stopping all 25 shots. This marked the first time a European team has shut out Finland in the Olympics.

== Career statistics ==
=== Regular season and playoffs ===
			Regular season								Playoffs/Relegation
Season	Team	League	GP	W	L	Min	GA	SO	SV%	GAA	GP	W	L	Min	GA	SO	SV%	GAA
2011–12	HC Poruba U16	ELMD	20	7	13	1086	70	0	.889	3.87	–	–	–	–	–	–	–	–
2011–12	HC Poruba U18	ELSD	1							6.00	–	–	–	–	–	–	–	–
2011–12	SK Karviná	Liga žen	10	8	2	600	21	3	.883	2.10	2	0	2	64	23	0	.574	22.26
2012–13	HC Poruba U16	ELMD	20	4	16	1051	69	3	.902	3.94	–	–	–	–	–	–	–	–
2012–13	HC Poruba U18	ELSD	1							2.00	–	–	–	–	–	–	–	–
2012–13	SK Karviná	Liga žen	2	1	1	120	5	0	.884	2.50	4	4	0	240	5	1	.942	1.25
2013–14	HC Poruba U18	ELSD	12	0	12	458	39	0	.883	5.11	–	–	–	–	–	–	–	–
2013–14	SK Karviná	Liga žen	3	3	0	120	4	0	.852	2.00	3	3	0	180	5	1	.821	1.67
2014–15	Biryusa Krasnoyarsk	RWHL
2015-16	SDE HF	Riksserien	27	1	25	1538	92	1	.904	3.59	8	8	0	485	13	1	.926	1.16
2016-17	SDE HF	SDHL	21	3	17	1218	59	2	.926	2.91	5	4	1	304	10	0	.918	1.97
2017–18	HC Poruba B	Krajský přebor	6					1			–	–	–	–	–	–	–	–
2017–18	SK Karviná	Extraliga žen	9	6	3	494	14	2	.924	1.70	1	0	1	65	3	0	.927	2.77
2018-19	MODO	SDHL	24	17	7	1455	60	2	.925	2.48	5	2	3	295	14	0	.901	2.85
2019-20	MODO	SDHL	24	8	16	1401	70	2	.908	3.00	2	2	0	120	0	2	0.00	1.00
2020-21	MODO	SDHL	27	15	12	1623	59	4	.929	2.18	2	0	2	128	8	0	.887	3.78
2021-22	MoDo	SDHL	147	16	7	1443	54	1	.924	2.25	3	1	2	227	6	0	.943	1.59
SDHL totals			123	60	84	8675	394	12	.919	2.73	25	17	8	1558	51	3	.920	1.96

=== International ===
Year	Team	Event	Result	GP	W	L	MIN	GA	SO	GAA	SV%
2013	Czech Republic U18	WW18	4th	5	1	3	208:26	18	0	5.18	.880
2014	Czech Republic U18	WW18	3rd place, bronze medalist(s)	6	3	2	345:00	9	2	1.57	.951
2014	Czech Republic	WW D1A	1st	4	4	0	240:00	2	2	0.50	.975
2015	Czech Republic	WW D1A	1st	4	4	0	240:00	2	2	0.50	.954
2016	Czech Republic	WW	6th	5	1	3	304:48	14	0	2.76	.905
2017	Czech Republic	OGQ	DNQ	3	2	1	178:41	6	1	2.01	.891
2017	Czech Republic	WW	8th	5	1	4	305:58	12	0	2.35	.897
2019	Czech Republic	WW	6th	4	3	1	240:00	8	0	2.00	.918
2021	Czech Republic	WW	7th	6	4	2	358:14	7	2	1.17	.933
2021	Czech Republic	OGQ	Q	2	2	0	120:00	2	0	1.00	.910
2022	Czech Republic	OG	7th	5	2	3	262:03	7	0	1.60	.945
2022	Czech Republic	WW	3rd place, bronze medalist(s)	7	6	1	360:41	11	1	1.83	.913
2024	Czech Republic	WW	4th	7	3	4	430:00	18	2	2.51	.926
2025	Czech Republic	WW	4th	6	2	4	347:51	15	2	2.59	.914
2026	Czech Republic	OG	5th	3	1	2	179:14	6	1	2.01	.933
Junior totals				11	4	5	553:26	27	2	2.93	.919
Senior totals				61	35	25	3567:30	110	13	1.85	.923
