= Leanne Ganney =

English ice hockey forward

- Born: October 4, 1991 (age 34) Basingstoke, England
- Height: 172 cm (5 ft 8 in)
- Position: Forward
- Shoots: Right
- SDHL team: SDE Hockey
- Played for: Bracknell Queen Bees; Guildford Lightning
- National team: Great Britain
- Playing career: 2003–present

Leanne Ganney (born 4 October 1991) is an English ice hockey player, currently serving as captain of SDE Hockey in the Swedish Women's Hockey League (SDHL) and the national team of Great Britain (Team GB).

== Playing career ==
At the age of 12, Ganney began playing with the Guildford Lightning in the highest division of English women's hockey. She would play with Guildford for four years, before switching to the Bracknell Queen Bees.

In 2017, Ganney signed with SDE in Sweden. In her first season, she served as an assistant captain, and was named captain in 2018. In 2020, the team made the playoffs for the first time, as she put up 17 points in 36 games.

=== International ===
Ganney has made over 40 appearances with the British senior team, for whom she has served as captain since 2015. She has won three IIHF World Women's Championship Division II silver medals and three bronze medals.

== Career statistics ==
			Regular season					Playoffs
Season	Team	League	GP	G	A	Pts	PIM	GP	G	A	Pts	PIM
2017–18	SDE Hockey	SDHL	36	10	9	19	55	-	-	-	-	-
2018–19	SDE Hockey	SDHL	35	13	13	26	18	-	-	-	-	-
2019–20	SDE Hockey	SDHL	36	7	10	17	45	2	2	0	2	2
SDHL totals			107	30	32	62	118	2	2	0	2	2
