= Lovisa Berndtsson =

Swedish ice hockey player (born 1988)

- Born: 2 December 1988 (age 37) Stockholm, Sweden
- Height: 5 ft 5 in (165 cm)
- Weight: 146 lb (66 kg; 10 st 6 lb)
- Position: Goaltender
- Catches: Left
- SDHL team Former teams: SDE HF: Buffalo Beauts; Djurgårdens IF Hockey; AIK IF; Södertälje SK; Segeltorps IF; Västerhaninge IF
- National team: Sweden
- Playing career: 2006–present

Lovisa Berndtsson (born 9 December 1988) is a Swedish ice hockey goaltender who competes for SDE HF in the Swedish Women's Hockey League (SDHL). She has also represented Sweden internationally, including at the 2017 IIHF Women's World Championship.

Berndtsson has competed in the SDHL, formerly known as Riksserien until 2016, representing Djurgårdens IF Hockey and AIK Hockey, and has also played in the Premier Hockey Federation (PHF) as a member of the Buffalo Beauts.

== Playing career ==
Berndtsson began her Riksserien career with Segeltorps IF, appearing in a single game during the 2008–09 season. She then spent several years playing for Södertälje SK in Division 1 (which was renamed Damettan in 2015), before making her return to Riksserien by signing with AIK IF for the 2013–14 campaign. The following season, 2014–15, she played for SDE HF, and ahead of the 2015–16 season, she joined Djurgårdens IF Hockey. In her second year with Djurgården, Berndtsson helped lead the team to an SDHL Championship title, posting the third-highest save percentage in the league at .940 over 27 regular-season games, and recording shutouts in every playoff round.

She was chosen by the Buffalo Beauts during the 2021 NWHL International Draft on July 25, 2021. The next day, she signed a professional contract with the Beauts, becoming the first player from that draft to officially sign with an NWHL team.

=== International ===
She competed as a member of the Swedish national women's ice hockey team at the 2017 IIHF Women’s World Championship.
