= Emma Eliasson =

Swedish ice hockey player

- Born: 12 June 1989 (age 37) Kiruna, Sweden
- Height: 167 cm (5 ft 6 in)
- Weight: 72 kg (159 lb; 11 st 5 lb)
- Position: Defence
- Shot: Left
- Played for: Luleå HF/MSSK; Munksund-Skuthamns SK; Brynäs IF; Modo Hockey; Kiruna IF
- National team: Sweden
- Playing career: 2005–2017
Medal record
Women's ice hockey
Representing Sweden
Olympic Games
Silver medal – second place	2006 Turin	Team
World Championships
Bronze medal – third place	2005 Sweden
Bronze medal – third place	2007 Canada

Emma Maria Josefin Eliasson (born 12 June 1989 in Kiruna, Sweden) is a Swedish retired ice hockey player. Considered one of the greatest Swedish defenders to ever play the game and known for her offensive abilities and physical style of play, she averaged over a point per game in her 10-year SDHL career, playing in five SDHL championship finals, and made over 230 appearances for the Swedish national team, winning a silver medal at the 2006 Winter Olympics.

== Career ==
Growing up in Kiruna, first in the Karesuando district and then in central Kiruna, Eliasson often played on boys' hockey teams. She has spoken out about her experience being ridiculed for being a girl playing hockey, stating that she had to "show that she was better than them, or just simply run over them in order to win respect." Between the ages of 14 and 15, she played for Modo Hockey, taking the bus to commute from Kiruna to Örnsköldsvik.

In 2006, she moved to Gävle to attend high school and play for Brynäs IF. For three years in a row between 2010 and 2012, Brynäs made it to the playoff finals and lost, with her scoring a semi-finals hat-trick to take the club to finals in 2012.

She signed for Munksund-Skuthamns SK ahead of the 2012–13 season, and was named an assistant captain for the club.

After facing financial difficulties, Munksund-Skuthamns SK merged with Luleå HF in 2015 to form Luleå HF/MSSK. She was named captain of the newly formed team, scoring a career-best 45 points in 2015–16, leading the team to a championship victory, her first in her career, and being named Riksserien Defender of the Year. She was named Swedish Hockey Girl of the Year in 2016. After receiving the award, she called on the Swedish Ice Hockey Federation to change the name of the award to something less outdated.

She put up 37 points in 36 games in 2016–17, as Riksserien changed its name to become the SDHL, leading Luleå to a first-place finish in the regular season for the second year in a row. She added another 3 points in 4 playoff games as the club was eliminated in the playoff semi-finals by HV71.

In May 2017, she announced her retirement from hockey, citing high levels of stress leading to heart palpitations and her controversial removal from the Swedish national team as reasons. Upon her retirement, Luleå head coach Fredrik Glader stated that "The best defender ever in Swedish women's hockey has ended her career."

In 2018, Kiruna IF announced that she named an honorary club member along with former NHL-defender Börje Salming, the first two players to be awarded that honour in 15 years. The next year, the club announced that they would be retiring her number, making her the first player in the club's history to be awarded the honour.

== International career ==
She made over 200 international appearances for the Sweden women's national ice hockey team. She won a silver medal at the 2006 Winter Olympics in Turin, Italy, and would again represent Sweden at the Olympics in 2010 and 2014. She scored a total of 7 points in 16 Olympic matches.

After her 2006 silver medal, a portrait of her was hung inside the Kiruna hockey arena, but was removed after being repeatedly vandalised. The portrait was later put back up permanently.

After Sweden lost to Finland in the 2014 Olympic quarterfinals, she announced that she was retiring from international play. She returned to the national team in 2015.

=== Controversial removal ===
In 2017, she was controversially kicked out of the Swedish national team by head coach Leif Boork. After not having spoken to her in months, Boork told the press that the national team "leadership has been too weak" and that it was "time to stop compromising." A year later, Boork would be fired as Sweden's coach after leading to a seventh-place finish at the 2018 Olympics, allegations of bullying Jenni Asserholt into retirement, and a player petition for his resignation. After her retirement, Eliasson harshly criticised the Swedish Ice Hockey Federation, stating that the Federation "betrayed [the players] when we were most vulnerable." She stated that after Sweden's quarter-finals defeat in the 2016 World Championships, 14 players on the team met in a hotel room in Norrtälje to discuss the team's poor moral and performance, and to attempt to address complaints over poor conditions such as being fed outdated food and strict rules of conduct intruding into their personal lives, including dictating what clothes players could wear. The Swedish Ice Hockey Federation refused to meet with the players.

In 2019, after the country was relegated from the top IIHF division for the first time, the players went on strike. She spoke out in support of the striking players, stating that she felt like "a lot of good will come from it."

== Personal life ==
Eliasson has a degree in economics from the Luleå University of Technology. She has also spent most of her summers working as a miner in Kiruna's magnetite mines.

After her retirement from hockey, she played football for a year as a midfielder for Notvikens IK in Luleå. In 2018, she returned to the Luleå HF organisation to become an assistant coach for the boy's U16 side.

== Career statistics ==
=== Club statistics ===
Note: Riksserien changed its name to the SDHL in 2016.

			Regular season					Playoffs
Season	Team	League	GP	G	A	Pts	PIM	GP	G	A	Pts	PIM
2007–08	Brynäs IF	Riksserien	14	8	4	12	14	4	1	1	2	2
2008–09	Brynäs IF	Riksserien	20	2	3	5	38	7	4	4	8	2
2009–10	Brynäs IF	Riksserien	19	16	10	26	26	2	1	1	2	4
2010–11	Brynäs IF	Riksserien	24	21	15	36	22	4	4	1	5	6
2011–12	Brynäs IF	Riksserien	22	12	14	26	28	4	3	4	7	2
2012–13	Munksund-Skuthamns SK	Riksserien	24	18	7	25	75	2	0	1	1	2
2013–14	Munksund-Skuthamns SK	Riksserien	28	3	14	17	52	4	4	4	8	4
2014–15	Munksund-Skuthamns SK	Riksserien	27	13	22	35	32	2	0	2	2	6
2015–16	Luleå HF/MSSK	Riksserien	34	10	35	45	26	7	0	2	2	14
2016–17	Luleå HF/MSSK	SDHL	36	11	26	37	26	4	2	1	3	6
SDHL totals			248	114	150	264	339	40	19	21	40	48

=== International ===
Year	Team	Event	Result	GP	G	A	Pts	PIM
2005	Sweden	WC	3rd place, bronze medalist(s)	5	0	0	0	4
2006	Sweden	Oly	2nd place, silver medalist(s)	5	0	1	1	6
2007	Sweden	WC	3rd place, bronze medalist(s)	5	0	1	1	8
2008	Sweden	WC	5th	4	1	2	3	6
2009	Sweden	WC	4th	5	0	2	2	2
2010	Sweden	Oly	4th	5	0	2	2	6
2011	Sweden	WC	5th	5	1	1	2	6
2013	Sweden	WC	7th	5	1	2	3	2
2014	Sweden	Oly	4th	6	1	3	4	6
2016	Sweden	WC	5th	5	1	3	4	6
Senior totals				50	5	17	22	52
