= 2019 Sweden women's national ice hockey team strike =

The 2019 Sweden women's national ice hockey team strike was a months-long strike by the players of the Sweden women's national ice hockey team.

== Background ==
=== Stagnation ===
After winning silver at the 2006 Winter Olympics, becoming the first country other than the US or Canada to reach the women's Olympic finals, and winning bronze at the 2005 and 2007 IIHF Women's World Championship, the Swedish national team went through a period of stagnation, finishing in 5th place in 3 of the 4 World Championships held between 2008 and 2012, and finishing in 4th in the 2010 Winter Olympics.

In November 2009, Sweden defeated Finland 2–1 in the preliminary round of the 2009 4 Nations Cup and defeated Finland against in the bronze medal game of the tournament. Since then, Sweden has failed to win a preliminary round game in the tournament.

=== Leif Boork-era ===
After Sweden's quarter-finals defeat in the 2016 World Championships, 14 players on the team met in a hotel room in Norrtälje to discuss the team's poor moral and performance, and to attempt to address complaints over poor conditions such as being fed outdated food and strict rules of conduct intruding into their personal lives, including dictating what clothes players could wear. The Swedish Ice Hockey Association refused to meet with the players.

Later in the summer of 2016, Leif Boork kicked veteran defender Emma Eliasson off the team, despite her having just been named Swedish Player of the Year and having captained Luleå HF/MSSK to a Riksserien championship, telling the press that the national team "leadership has been too weak" and that it was "time to stop compromising." National team captain Jenni Asserholt then retired from the national team at the age of 28, after refusing to join the team in June and amidst allegations that Boork was bullying her over her weight.

In August 2016, the players petitioned the Swedish Ice Hockey Association to have Boork fired as head coach of the national team. The Association declared it had full confidence in Boork's leadership.

In an exhibition game against Finland held in Luleå in September 2016, the fans in attendance held a protest against the coaching decisions, holding up banners calling for "Emma to the National Team" and "Resign Boork."

In March 2017, the NSD newspaper revealed that the men's national team could expect a bonus of several million kronor for advancing to the finals of the World Championships, while the women's team would receive nothing for achieving the same feat.

On 5 May 2017, Boork made a series of controversial tweets accusing players of compromising success, despite having earlier declared himself the "women's hockey knight" of Twitter.

In June 2017, the Swedish Ice Hockey Association ended subsidies for SDHL transfer fees for foreign players, raising the cost of a transfer fee from 3500kr to 12 500kr, a move widely condemned by league coaches but supported by Boork.

In December 2017, SVT Sport released the results of a survey showing that over half of national team players had considered quitting hockey.

At the end of 2017, the Swedish Ice Hockey Association announced that it would not be renewing Boork's contract as head coach after the 2018 Winter Olympics. Out of all the international games the team had played in the 2016–17, it had only won four.

=== Relegation ===
On 1 April 2018, former AIK IF head coach and alternate captain in the silver medal-winning Olympic team of 2006 Ylva Martinsen was named head coach of the national team.

In April 2018, the national team players announced that they had unionised under the Swedish Ice Hockey Player's Central Organization (SICO), the same union that represents the players of the men's national team and of the top-flight domestic men's league, the SHL.

In July 2018, the Swedish Olympic Committee announced that it was cutting all funding from the women's national team.

At the 2019 IIHF Women's World Championship, held in Finland in April 2019, Sweden finished 4th in Group B and 9th overall in the tournament after only managing to win a single game. For the first time in history, the country was relegated from the top division of the IIHF.

In July 2019, the location for the 2019 4 Nations Cup was revealed as Luleå, in northern Sweden.

=== North American strikes ===
In March 2017, the players of the United States women's national ice hockey team announced their intention to strike ahead of the 2017 IIHF Women's World Championship, after over a year of failed negotiations with USA Hockey concerning wages and playing conditions. The players were publicly supported by the players' associations for the NBA, WNBA, MLB and the NHLPA, and all players USA Hockey approached to serve as replacements for the striking players refused to play. After two weeks, the players were able to reach a four-year deal with USA Hockey, including increased pay and being paid wages outside of the Olympic period.

After the collapse of the Canadian Women's Hockey League in May 2019, over 200 players announced their intentions to sit out from any professional leagues in the hopes of securing greater investment and media coverage of the sport. The #ForTheGame movement soon became more formally organised in the form of the Professional Women's Hockey Players Association.

== Strike ==
In August 2019, all 43 players selected to the Swedish national team camp ahead of the Five Nations announced that they would be striking in protest over a lack of support and financial compensation from the Swedish Ice Hockey Association. Two days later, the players along with their union, SICO, published a list of issues they wanted addressed, listing:

1. The Swedish Ice Hockey Association's withdrawal of all financial compensation for the women's national team (totalling over 400 000 kr)
2. The lack of insurance for players of the women's national team
3. The limited time given for national team camps
4. The poor travel conditions for the women's national team
5. The lack of any short- or long-term plan for the growth of women's hockey in Sweden
6. The fact that the women's team was forced to use the same equipment as the Swedish junior boys' teams and the lack of equipment tailored specifically for women
7. The lack of staffing for the women's national side (with less staff than the boys' U18 national team)
8. The refusal of the Association to meet with the players to try and address the issues
9. The low standards of nutrition provided to players while on national team duty, including food products several months past their best-by date

The strike adopted the hashtag #FörFramtiden (For the Future) on social media, with players releasing coordinated social media posts stating that "Many of us have borne the frustration that led to today's decision for several years. Now it's all about the younger generation not having to do it." The Five Nations Cup was cancelled due to the strike.

In September 2019, the 4 Nations Cup was cancelled due to the strike, as the Swedish Ice Hockey Association couldn't guarantee its participation.

In October 2019, over two months since the beginning of the strike, it was announced that a deal had been reached between the players and the Association. The deal included compensation for national team duties, bonuses for medals in international tournaments, as well as an additional bonus once the team earned promotion back to the top IIHF division.

=== Support ===
The strike received widespread support from other Swedish players, both active and retired. NWHL goaltender Lovisa Selander stated that "I think what we're doing is right and this was a good time to do it." Emma Eliasson, who had retired in 2017, stated that "a lot of good will come from [the strike]."

The PWHPA spoke out in support of the striking players, with co-founder and board member Liz Knox stating that "We support them striving for better because in the end, women's hockey as a whole will be the better for it."

Several NHL players and members of the Swedish men's national team spoke out in favour of the strike, including Henrik Lundqvist, who stated that he believed that the Association couldn't improve conditions "then there is no other way." Mika Zibanejad announced that for each burger sold at a restaurant owned by him, 10kr would be donated to the striking players. Mattias Ekholm stated that "It's strong that they're daring to speak up. It helps us to be better as a hockey world."

=== Criticism ===
Swedish Ice Hockey Association chairman Anders Larsson said that the strike damaged the team's brand, represented a failure of both the Association and the team, and that he felt the Association treated both the men's and the women's sides equally.

SDE Hockey goaltender Sofia Reideborn, who had played for Sweden in two IIHF World Women's U18 Championship, criticised the strike, stating that the players should first "show that you are good before making demands" and that she wouldn't want to play in the Swedish national team because she wouldn't be welcomed by the other players.

== Aftermath ==
The Swedish national team played their first match since the beginning of the strike in December 2019, losing 3–2 to Germany. In March 2020, national team head coach Ylva Martinsen stepped down, being replaced by Ulf Lundberg.

Sweden was set to compete in the 2020 IIHF Women's World Championship Division I in France against France, Norway, Austria, Slovakia, and the Netherlands, aiming for promotion back to the top IIHF division. The tournament was cancelled, however, due to the COVID-19 pandemic. The country will instead compete against the same group for promotion in the 2021 IIHF Women's World Championship Division I. The country will also be competing for qualification to the 2022 Winter Olympics in Group E, the qualification tournament set to be held in August 2021 in Sweden.

In the summer of 2020, several national team veterans announced their retirement from hockey, including Erica Udén Johansson and Fanny Rask. The latter announced her retirement from hockey via an Instagram post in which she voiced her frustration with the pace of professionalization in women's hockey and her exhaustion with the financial insecurity of being an SDHL player.

What I dreamed of in my youth was to become a professional [ice hockey player]. That the [women's] league would grow to such an extent that we could live on hockey. (No, not millions, everyone knows it is unreasonable still.) But I have always thought that I would be able to join-in when we become professionals. But it has not happened and I feel that we are at a standstill... And I don't see that there will be any change. Of course, I know that things are happening but for me it is going too slowly and I am incredibly uncertain that it will ever happen... So maybe I chose the wrong path, had the wrong dream and too high of demands. I hope there are some people who still have the strength to carry on and who work for a future for women's hockey. My energy has run out, I'm empty and I'm sorry.

In September 2020, SICO announced the first-ever collective bargaining agreement between the players of the SDHL, the league and the national team, providing injury insurance for both league and international games along with aid for education and job-finding post-retirement. The agreement entered into force on 1 October. Later that month, the newly appointed Swedish Ice Hockey Association general-secretary Johan Stark called for the men's and women's national teams to receive equal conditions;

Several commentators have also called to introduce restrictions on the number of foreign players on teams in the SDHL as a means to give Swedish players more icetime and improve the national team's performance.

== See also ==
- SDHL
- Professional Women's Hockey Players Association
- U.S. women's national soccer team pay discrimination claim
- Gender pay gap in sports
- Misogyny in ice hockey
