= List of SDHL seasons =

This is a list of seasons of the Swedish Women's Hockey League (SDHL) (formerly named Riksserien) since the league was inaugurated in the 2007–08 season.

== Seasons ==
=== As Riksserien ===
2007–08 | 2008–09 | 2009–10 | 2010–11 | 2011–12 | 2012–13 | 2013–14 | 2014–15 | 2015–16

=== As Swedish Women's Hockey League ===
2016–17 | 2017–18 | 2018–19 | 2019–20 | 2020–21 | 2021–22 | 2022–23 | 2023–24 | 2024–25

== See also ==
- Damettan
