= Sara Grahn =

Swedish ice hockey player (born 1988)

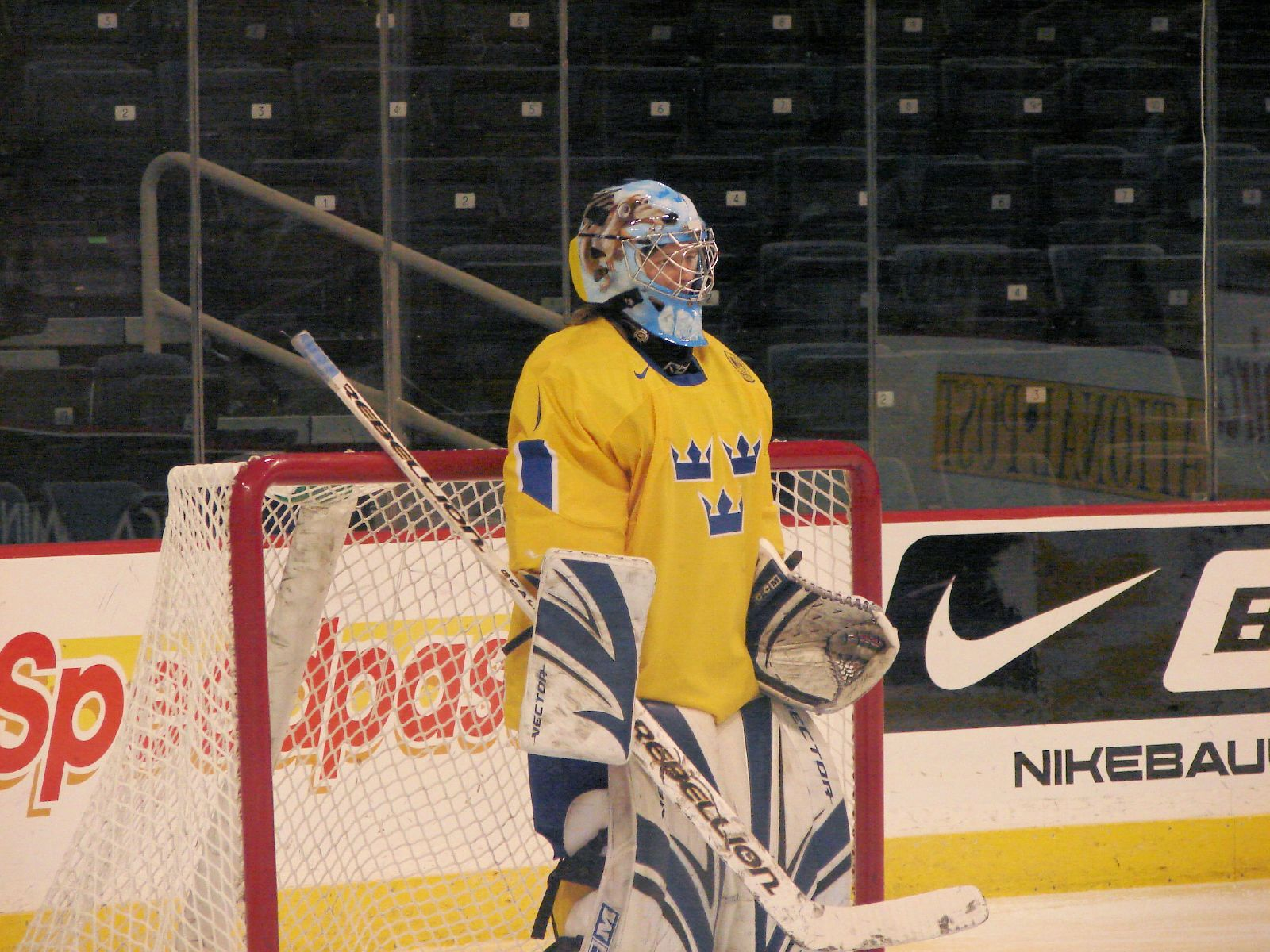
- Sara Grahn
- Born: 25 September 1988 (age 38) Örebro, Sweden
- Height: 1.70 m (5 ft 7 in)
- Weight: 67 kg (148 lb; 10 st 8 lb)
- Position: Goaltender
- Catches: Left
- SDHL team Former teams: Luleå HF/MSSK; Brynäs IF; Oppala IK; Linköpings HC; Örebro HK
- National team: Sweden
- Playing career: 2004–present
Medal record
Women's ice hockey
Representing Sweden
World Championships
Bronze medal – third place	2007 Canada

Sara Karin Maria Grahn (born 25 September 1988) is a Swedish ice hockey goaltender for Luleå HF/MSSK in the Swedish Women's Hockey League (Swedish: Svenska damhockeyligan, SDHL) and the Swedish national team. She is the longest tenured goaltender in SDHL history, the only one to have ever played more than 300 games, and has won the SDHL championship five times.

== Career ==
Growing up in Hallsberg, Grahn began skating at the age of four and began playing as a goaltender at the age of ten. When Riksserien was founded as the top flight of women's hockey in Sweden in 2007, she signed professionally with Linköping HC.

After three years in Linköping, she left the club to sign with Brynäs IF, attracted in part by the more professional environment and the presence of goaltending coach Pecka Alcén.

In February 2015, she posted a 55-save shutout in a 1–0 victory over Leksands IF in the playoff quarterfinals. She was named the Riksserien Goaltender of the Year for the 2014–15 season.

In the 2015–16 season, she played two matches for Brynäs' U20 boys' team, posting a .971 save percentage. That year, she was also loaned out to Hockeytvåan club Oppala IK, in the third division of Swedish men's hockey, for a game in late November 2015, where she posted a shutout.

After eight seasons with Brynäs, she left the club to sign with reigning champions Luleå HF/MSSK ahead of the 2018–19 SDHL season, citing the greater investment into women's hockey in Luleå and the delays in addressing problems in Brynäs.

== International career ==
Grahn has represented the Swedish national team at three consecutive Olympics, making her Olympic debut at the 2010 Winter Olympics, and representing the country again in 2014 and 2018. She, however, didn't play any games at the 2014 Olympics, serving as the team's third goaltender.

She made her IIHF World Championship debut for Sweden at the 2007 IIHF Women's World Championship, and has appeared in an additional nine World Championships since then.

She took part in the 2019 Sweden women's national ice hockey team strike.

== Personal life ==
Grahn has studied at the Luleå University of Technology.

In August 2018, she launched the Sara Grahn Goalie Development Camp for young girls in Sandviken.

== Career statistics ==
Year	Team	Event	Result	GP	W	L	T/OT	MIN	GA	SO	GAA	SV%
2010	Sweden	OG	4th	3	1	1	0	153:46	8	0	3.12	0.864
2018	Sweden	OG	7th	5	2	3	0	262:14	8	1	1.83	0.945
