= Ulf Lundberg =

Swedish footballer

Personal information
- Full name: Ulf Lundberg
- Date of birth: 6 November 1955 (age 70)
- Position: Defender

Senior career*
Years	Team	Apps	(Gls)
–1973	Alterdalens IF		
1974–1976	IFK Luleå	66	(5)
1977–1980	IFK Sundsvall	96	(9)
1981–1986	Djurgårdens IF	99	(6)

International career
	Sweden U21	3	(0)
1979	Sweden	1	(0)
- * Club domestic league appearances and goals

Ulf Lundberg (born 6 November 1955) is a Swedish former footballer. He made 27 Allsvenskan appearances for Djurgårdens IF and scored one goal.
