= Michelle Löwenhielm =

Swedish ice hockey forward

- Born: 22 March 1995 (age 31) Sollentuna, Sweden
- Height: 173 cm (5 ft 8 in)
- Weight: 64 kg (141 lb; 10 st 1 lb)
- Position: Centre
- Shoots: Left
- SDHL team Former teams: SDE Hockey; HV71; Connecticut Whale; Minnesota Duluth Bulldogs; AIK IF; Ormsta HC
- National team: Sweden
- Playing career: 2010–present
Medal record
World Championship
Bronze medal – third place	2026 Denmark

Michelle Karin Löwenhielm (born 22 March 1995) is a Swedish ice hockey forward and the captain of SDE Hockey in the Swedish Women's Hockey League (SDHL). She has represented Sweden in the women’s ice hockey tournament at the 2014 Winter Olympics and at six IIHF Women's World Championships.

== International career ==
Löwenhielm was selected for the Sweden women's national ice hockey team in the 2014 Winter Olympics. She played in all six games, scoring one goal and adding two assists.

As of 2014, Löwenhielm has also appeared for Sweden at two IIHF Women's World Championships. Her first appearance came in 2012.

Löwenhielm made four appearances for the Sweden women's national under-18 ice hockey team, at the IIHF World Women's U18 Championships, with the first in 2010. This included winning bronze medals in 2010, 2012 and 2013.

== Career statistics ==
Through 2013–14 season

Year	Team	Event	GP	G	A	Pts	PIM
2010	Sweden U18	U18	6	0	1	1	6
2011	Sweden U18	U18	5	3	0	3	6
2012	Sweden U18	U18	6	2	3	5	2
2012	Sweden	WW	5	0	1	1	2
2013	Sweden U18	U18	6	1	5	6	6
2013	Sweden	WW	5	0	0	0	0
2014	Sweden	Oly	6	1	2	3	2
