= Sofia Reideborn =

Swedish ice hockey goaltender

- Born: 24 March 1999 (age 25); Stockholm, Sweden
- Height: 167 cm (5 ft 6 in)
- Weight: 65 kg (143 lb; 10 st 3 lb)
- Position: Goaltender
- Catches: Left
- SDHL team Former teams: Göteborg HC; Sundbybergs IK; SDE Hockey; AIK IF
- Playing career: 2015–present

Sofia Reideborn (born 24 March 1999) is a Swedish ice hockey goaltender, currently playing with Göteborg HC of the Swedish Women's Hockey League (SDHL).

== Career ==
Born in Stockholm, Riedeborn began her career with AIK IF. In 2017, she left the club to join SDE Hockey, where she would take over the starting goalie position. She would go on to play with the club for the next four seasons, including the club's first ever playoff appearance in 2020.

A self-described "controversial player", Reideborn announced she was stepping back from hockey in July 2020 following a controversial podcast in which she made comments denounced by multiple players as misogynistic and homophobic. In September 2020, she criticised the members of the Swedish national women's football team for expressing support of Black Lives Matter during their European Championship qualifiers.

=== International ===
Riedeborn represented Sweden at the 2015 IIHF World Women's U18 Championship and 2017 IIHF World Women's U18 Championship. In 2019, she criticised the players boycotting the Swedish national team, saying that they should first "show that you are good before making demands". She later made said that she wouldn't want to play in the Swedish national team because she wouldn't be welcomed by the other players.

== Personal life ==
Her brother, Adam Reideborn, currently plays professionally with HC CSKA Moscow in the KHL.
