= SDE Hockey =

SDHL ice hockey team in Stockholm, Sweden

- City: Danderyd, Stockholm, Sweden
- League: SDHL
- Founded: 2007
- Home arena: Enebybergs Ishall
- Colours: Black, beige, white
- General manager: Helene Åström
- Head coach: Peter Elander
- Captain: Julie Zwarthoed
- Website: Official website

SDE Hockey are an ice hockey club in the Swedish Women's Hockey League (SDHL). They play at Enebybergs Ishall in the Enebyberg community of Danderyd Municipality in Metropolitan Stockholm.

== History ==
The club was formed in 2007 from the merger of the ice hockey sections of Stocksunds IF, Danderyds SK, and Enebybergs IF, the initials of which form the club's name.

The club first earned promotion to the SDHL in 2014. They have stayed in the league since, although were forced to play in the relegation series in each of their first five SDHL seasons. They made the quarter-finals for the first time in 2019–20 season.

== Season-by-season results ==
This is a partial list of the most recent seasons completed by SDE Hockey. Note that the SDHL was known as Riksserien until 2016.
Note: Finish = Rank at end of regular season; GP = Games played, W = Wins (3 points), OTW = Overtime wins (2 points), OTL = Overtime losses (1 point), L = Losses, GF = Goals for, GA = Goals against, Pts = Points, Top scorer: Points (Goals+Assists)

Season	League	Regular season										Postseason results
Season	League	Finish	GP	W	OTW	OTL	L	GF	GA	Pts	Top scorer	Postseason results
2015–16	Riksserien	10th	36	1	1	4	30	51	151	9	(Canada) M. Litchfield-Medd 22 (15+7)	Saved in relegation
2016–17	SDHL	10th	36	1	3	2	30	34	129	11	(Netherlands) K. Hamers 11 (5+6)	Saved in relegation
2017–18	SDHL	9th	36	6	2	0	28	54	137	22	(Switzerland) P. Stänz 26 (18+8)	Saved in relegation
2018–19	SDHL	9th	36	4	2	2	28	54	147	18	(England) L. Ganney 26 (13+13)	Saved in relegation
2019–20	SDHL	6th	36	11	4	4	17	68	88	45	(Netherlands) J. Zwarthoed 26 (15+11)	Lost quarterfinal to Brynäs
2020–21	SDHL	7th	36	10	3	3	20	69	96	39	(Netherlands) K. Hamers 26 (7+19)	Lost quarterfinals to Brynäs, 0–2
2021–22	SDHL	7th	36	12	1	3	20	65	97	41	(Sweden) M. Löwenhielm 26 (10+16)	Lost quarterfinals to HV71, 0–2
2022–23	SDHL	5th	32	10	2	7	13	74	88	41	(Sweden) M. Löwenhielm 29 (11+18)	Lost quarterfinals to MoDo, 0–2
2023–24	SDHL	7th	36	11	2	4	19	98	111	41	(Norway) M. Fischer 32 (14+18)	Lost quarterfinals to MoDo, 0–3

== Players and personnel ==
=== 2024–25 roster ===
As of 24 December 2024

No.	Nat	Player	Pos	S/G	Age	Acquired	Birthplace
19	(Sweden)	Hilda Arhammar Pakarinen	F	L	19	2023	Stockholm, Uppland, Sweden
23	(Norway)	Emma Bergesen	D	L	26	2024	Stavanger, Vestlandet, Norway
88	(Sweden)	Lovisa Berndtsson	G	L	37	2024	Stockholm, Sweden
9	(United States)	Madison Bizal	D	L	26	2024	Elk River, Minnesota, United States
3	(Hungary)	Alexandra Cservjacsenko	D	L	20	2024	
26	(Norway)	Mathea Fischer	C	L	28	2021	Oslo, Østlandet, Norway
24	(Sweden)	Mimmi Gill	C	L	22	2024	Västerås, Västmanland, Sweden
4	(Netherlands)	Kayleigh Hamers	D	L	28	2015	Tilburg, Noord-Brabant, Netherlands
17	(Sweden)	Julia Johansson	D	L	31	2021	Gimo, Uppland, Sweden
65	(Sweden)	Lisa Johansson (A)	W	R	33	2024	Nybro, Kalmar, Sweden
16	(United States)	Gabby Jones	F	R	26	2023	Westfield, Massachusetts, United States
20	(Norway)	Andrea Horst Kaspersen	F	R	23	2021	Trondheim, Trøndelag, Norway
56	(United States)	Dominique Kremer	D	R	28	2024	Fargo, North Dakota, United States
67	(Sweden)	Michelle Löwenhielm	C	L	30	2021	Sollentuna, Uppland, Sweden
71	(Germany)	Emily Nix	F	L	28	2024	Hamburg, Germany
13	(Hungary)	Lotti Odnoga (A)	D	L	27	2023	Győr, Dunántúl, Hungary
34	(United States)	Liliane Perreault	F	R	25	2024	Toronto, Ontario, Canada
6	(Sweden)	Ella Planting-Bergloo	D	L	20	2021	
32	(Canada)	Kassidy Sauvé	G	L	29	2024	Whitby, Ontario, Canada
18	(Canada)	Malia Schneider	F	R	27	2024	Millarville, Alberta, Canada
7	(Sweden)	Ella Sköldebäck	D	R	21	2024	Stockholm, Sweden
14	(Sweden)	Magdalena Winbo	LW	L	31	2013	Stockholm, Uppland, Sweden
25	(Sweden)	Maya Zotterman	C	R	20	2023	Danderyd, Uppland, Sweden
10	(Netherlands)	Julie Zwarthoed (C)	RW	R	31	2015	Schinnen, Limburg, Netherlands

Coaching and team personnel

- Head coach: Peter Elander
- Goaltending coach: Filip Palmbäck
- Conditioning coach: Erica Udén Johansson
- Physical therapist: Hanna Pintér
- Equipment manager: Camilla Henricsson-Bajas

=== Team captaincy history ===
- Frida Ekdahl, 2013–14
- Linn Hansén, 2014–15
- Hanna Blomqvist, 2016–17
- Leanne Ganney, 2018–2021
- Michelle Löwenhielm, 2021–22
- Kelly Murray, 2022–23
- Julie Zwarthoed, 2023–

=== Head coaches ===
- Jonas Möller, c. 2012–2015
- Erik Lektorp, 2015–16
- Maggie Litchfield Medd, 2016–2018
- Shane Warschaw, 2018–2020
- Dominique Di Rocco, 2020–21
- Johanna Ikonen, 2021–22
- Jan Bylesjö, 2022–23
- Nicklas Stensson, 2023–24
- Emilie O'Konor, 22 April 2024 – 12 November 2024
- Peter Elander, 13 November 2024 –

== Notable alumnae ==
Seasons played with SDE listed alongside player name.

- Lovisa Berndtsson, 2014–15
- Hanna Blomqvist, 2012–2023
- Sandra Claesson, 2012–2016
- Amanda Helgöstam, 2012–2016
- Emilie O'Konor, 2012–2015
- Sofia Reideborn, 2016–2020
- Danijela Rundqvist, 2013–14
- Lovisa Selander, 2012–2015
- Hanna Åström, 2016–2019

=== International players ===
Flag indicates nation of primary IIHF eligibility; some players may have multiple citizenship.

- (Canada) Alexandra Anderson, 2019–2022
- (Canada) Kelty Apperson, 2019–2021
- (Netherlands) Zoe Barbier, 2014–2016
- (Germany) Tabea Botthof, 2022–23
- (Hungary) Nóra Brgles, 2014–2018
- (United States) Amy Budde, 2019–2021
- (Canada) Hannah Clayton-Carroll, 2021–2023
- (United Kingdom) Leanne Ganney, 2017–2023
- (United Kingdom) Katie Henry, 2014–15
- (Czech Republic) Petra Herzigová, 2015–16
- (Netherlands) Mieneke de Jong, 2016–17
- (Netherlands) Chloë Keijzer, 2014–15
- (Czech Republic) Karolína Kosinová, 2023–24
- (Czech Republic) Karolína Kovářová, 2018–19
- (Canada) Maggie Litchfield Medd, 2015–2017
- (Norway) Linnea Holterud Olsson, 2015–16
- (Czech Republic) Lucie Manhartová, 2015–16
- (Canada) Kelly Murray, 2019–2023
- (Czech Republic) Klára Peslarová, 2015–2017
- (United States) Jacquie Pierri, 2019–2021
- (Hungary) Hanna Pintér, 2020–21
- (Hungary) Lili Pintér, 2015–2021
- (Canada) Lindsey Post, 2019–2023
- (Slovenia) Pia Pren, 2019–20
- (United States) Naomi Rogge, 2023–24
- (Switzerland) Phoebe Stänz, 2017–18
- (Czech Republic) Viktorie Švejdová, 2022–2024
- (Finland) Helmi Teivaala, 2016–2018
- (Canada) Amanda Titus, 2018–19
- (Austria) Nadine Ullrich, 2013–14
- (Austria) Eva-Maria Verworner, 2021–22
- (Czech Republic) Magdaléna Walicová, 2016–2021
- (Netherlands) Savine Wielenga, 2019–2021
