= 2019–20 SDHL season =

13th ice hockey season of the SDHL

- League: (Sweden) SDHL
- Sport: Ice hockey
- Duration: Scheduled for: September 2019 – February 2020; (Regular season); February – March 2020; (Playoffs)
- Average attendance: 178

Regular season
- Season champions: HV71
- Season MVP: Lara Stalder
- Top scorer: Lara Stalder (Brynäs IF)

Playoffs

SDHL seasons
- ← 2018–19 2020-21 →

The 2019-20 SDHL Season was the 13th season of the Swedish Women's Hockey League (SDHL). The season began in September 2019 and ended in February 2020. The playoffs began a week after the end of the regular season, but the finals were cancelled due to the 2019–20 coronavirus outbreak.

HV71 were regular season champions, and due to face Luleå HF/MSSK in the finals. Göteborg HC and Modo Hockey finished at the bottom of the table, but were able to avoid relegation to Damettan in the Playoffs to the SDHL.

Brynäs IF defender Lara Stalder led the league in points with 71 and was named league MVP. The highest attended match of the season came on 24 November 2019, with 3622 spectators turning out to watch Linköping HC host Luleå HF/MSSK.

== Regular season ==
Each team plays 36 games, with three points being awarded for winning in regulation time, two points for winning in overtime or shootout, one point for losing in overtime or shootout, and zero points for losing in regulation time. At the end of the regular season, the team that finishes with the most points is crowned the league champion.

=== Standings ===
Pos	Team	Pld	W	OTW	OTL	L	GF	GA	GD	Pts	Qualification
1	HV71	36	32	1	1	2	170	52	+118	99	Qualification to Quarter-finals
2	Luleå HF/MSSK	36	24	4	1	7	141	61	+80	81	Qualification to Quarter-finals
3	Brynäs IF	36	21	4	3	8	140	99	+41	74	Qualification to Quarter-finals
4	Djurgårdens IF	36	21	1	4	10	96	77	+19	69	Qualification to Quarter-finals
5	AIK	36	14	3	1	18	73	97	−24	49	Qualification to Quarter-finals
6	SDE Hockey	36	11	4	4	17	68	88	−20	45	Qualification to Quarter-finals
7	Linköping HC	36	10	3	4	19	73	107	−34	40	Qualification to Quarter-finals
8	Leksands IF	36	10	3	3	20	91	133	−42	39	Qualification to Quarter-finals
9	Modo Hockey	36	7	3	3	23	66	116	−50	30	Qualification to Relegation playoffs
10	Göteborg HC	36	2	2	4	28	52	140	−88	14	Qualification to Relegation playoffs

Source: SDHL.se
Rules for classification: 1) Points; 2) Goal difference; 3) Number of goals scored

=== Statistics ===
==== Scoring Leaders ====
The following shows the top ten players who led the league in points, at the conclusion of the regular season. If two or more skaters are tied (i.e. same number of points, goals and played games), all of the tied skaters are shown.

Player	Team	GP	G	A	Pts	+/–	PIM
(Switzerland) Lara Stalder	Brynäs IF	36	42	29	71	+36	41
(Canada) Kennedy Marchment	HV71	36	32	32	64	+48	8
(Finland) Petra Nieminen	Luleå HF/MSSK	36	25	30	55	+33	43
(Czech Republic) Katerina Mrazova	Brynäs IF	34	15	36	51	+35	18
(United States) Sidney Morin	HV71	36	15	34	49	+49	8
(Canada) Kaitlyn Tougas	HV71	36	14	35	49	+40	10
(Czech Republic) Denisa Křížová	Brynäs IF	34	20	27	47	+33	24
(Sweden) Hanna Olsson	HV71	34	21	25	46	+29	10
(Canada) Michela Cava	Brynäs IF	36	23	22	45	+14	26
(Finland) Ronja Savolainen	Luleå HF/MSSK	36	20	21	41	+39	49

==== Leading goaltenders ====
The following shows the top ten goaltenders who led the league in goals against average, provided that they have played at least 40% of their team's minutes, at the conclusion of the regular season.

Player	Team	GP	TOI	W	T	L	GA	SO	Sv%	GAA
(Spain) Alba Gonzalo	HV71	25	1454:03	23	0	2	33	7	93.24	1.36
(Sweden) Sara Grahn	Luleå HF/MSSK	23	1388:27	18	0	5	38	6	92.87	1.64
(Canada) Lindsey Post	SDE Hockey	19	1102:02	10	0	9	37	3	94.16	2.01
(Canada) Samantha Ridgewell	Djurgården IF	22	1268:19	14	0	6	43	1	91.96	2.03
(Finland) Meeri Räisänen	AIK	26	1503:59	12	0	13	61	4	92.42	2.43
(Sweden) Ellen Jonsson	Brynäs IF	22	1227:01	17	0	4	51	1	88.46	2.49
(Finland) Eveliina Suonpää	Linköping HC	31	1849:21	11	0	20	79	1	90.89	2.56
(Sweden) Sofia Reideborn	SDE Hockey	18	1072:33	5	0	12	50	3	92.05	2.80
(Sweden) Agnes Åker	Brynäs IF	16	938:40	8	0	7	45	1	89.73	2.88
(Czech Republic) Klara Peslarova	Modo Hockey	24	1400:20	8	0	16	70	2	90.75	3.00

== SDHL Awards ==
2019–20 SDHL awards
Award	Recipient(s)	Team
Guldhjälmen	Lara Stalder	Brynäs IF
SDHL MVP	Petra Nieminen	Luleå HF/MSSK
Best Goaltender	Lindsey Post	SDE Hockey
Best Defender	Sidney Morin	HV71
Best Forward	Lara Stalder	Brynäs IF
Elite Prospect Award	Maja Nylén Persson	Brynäs IF
Best Equipment Manager	Carina Marnéus	Luleå HF/MSSK
Leading Playmaker	Kateřina Mrázová	Brynäs IF

== See also ==
- Women's ice hockey in Sweden
