= 2014–15 Riksserien season =

- League: (Sweden) Riksserien
- Sport: Ice hockey
- Duration: Scheduled for: September 2014 – February 2015; (Regular season); February – March 2015; (Playoffs)
- Average attendance: 102

Regular season
- First place: Linköping HC
- Season MVP: Kim Martin Hasson
- Top scorer: Denise Altmann (Linköping HC)

Playoffs

Riksserien Finals
- Champions: Linköping HC
- Runners-up: AIK IF

Riksserien seasons
- ← 2013-14 2015–16 →

The 2014–15 Riksserien season was the eighth season of the Swedish Women's Hockey League. The season began in September 2014 and ended in March 2015. After going undefeated during the regular season, Linköping HC won their second consecutive Swedish championship.

It was the last season in which the league played with eight teams, expanding to ten before the 2015–16 season, the last season in which Piteå-based Munksund-Skuthamns SK played, being taken over by Luleå HF in the summer of 2015, and the first season in which SDE Hockey played in the top flight.

In the relegation playoffs against the top Damettan teams, both SDE and IF Sundsvall Hockey were able to keep their place in the SDHL, being joined by HV71 and Djurgårdens IF for the 2015–16 season.

== Standings ==
Each team played 28 regular season games, with three points being awarded for winning in regulation time, two points for winning in overtime or shootout, one point for losing in overtime or shootout, and zero points for losing in regulation time. At the end of the regular season, the team that finishes with the most points is crowned the league champion.

=== Regular season ===
Pos	Team	Pld	W	OTW	OTL	L	GF	GA	GD	Pts	Qualification
1	Linköping HC	28	26	2	0	0	142	28	+114	82	Qualification to Quarter-finals
2	AIK IF Dam	28	17	3	3	5	89	37	+52	60	Qualification to Quarter-finals
3	Leksands IF	28	18	0	1	9	105	51	+54	55	Qualification to Quarter-finals
4	Modo Hockey	28	15	1	5	7	96	56	+40	52	Qualification to Quarter-finals
5	Brynäs IF	28	11	3	1	13	64	67	−3	40	Qualification to Quarter-finals
6	Munksund-Skuthamns SK	28	10	2	1	15	73	92	−19	35	Qualification to Quarter-finals
7	SDE Hockey	28	3	0	0	25	42	147	−105	9	Qualification to Relegation playoffs
8	IF Sundsvall Hockey	28	1	0	0	27	21	154	−133	3	Qualification to Relegation playoffs

Source: SDHL.se
Rules for classification: 1) Points; 2) Goal difference; 3) Number of goals scored

== Riksserien awards ==
- Best Goaltender: Sara Grahn
- Best Defender: Annie Svedin
- Best Forward: Denise Altmann
- Riksserien MVP: Kim Martin Hasson
- Swedish Ice Hockey Association Hockey Girl of the Year: Emilia Ramboldt

== See also ==
- Women's ice hockey in Sweden
