= 2017–18 SDHL season =

- League: (Sweden) SDHL
- Sport: Ice hockey
- Duration: Scheduled for: September 2017 – February 2018; (Regular season); February – March 2018; (Playoffs)
- Average attendance: 192

Regular season
- First place: Luleå HF/MSSK
- Top scorer: Michelle Karvinen (Luleå HF/MSSK)

Playoffs

SDHL Finals
- Champions: Luleå HF/MSSK
- Runners-up: Linköping HC

SDHL seasons
- ← 2016–17 2018–19 →

The 2017–18 SDHL season was the eleventh season of the Swedish Women's Hockey League (Svenska damhockeyligan, or SDHL). The season began in September 2017 and ended in March 2018.

== Significant events ==
=== Pre-season ===
After the end of the 2016–17 season, the IF Sundsvall Hockey organisation cut its women's side, despite having managed to save their place in the SDHL during the qualification playoffs the organisation citing a need to save money for its third-tier men's side. The club was criticised for the decision, with forward Mathilda Gustafsson stating that "If we were a company instead of an association, you would never shut down a department which only employed women because the cost inhibits the male employees." The third-placed club in the qualification playoffs, Damettan club Göteborg HC were promoted to the SDHL to take their place for the 2017–18 season. SDE Hockey had finished second in the qualification playoffs, and so were able to secure their SDHL place for 2017–18.

In May 2017, Swedish national team star and former SDHL Defender of the Year Emma Eliasson announced her retirement, citing stress and her controversial removal from the national team. A number of high-profile North American players joined the SDHL as free agents, including Michela Cava and Sidney Morin, as well as Swiss star Lara Stalder, who had been playing at university in Minnesota.

In June 2017, the Swedish Ice Hockey Association announced that it was ending subsidies for foreign player fees in the league, citing a desire to promote the development of Swedish players in the league. This increased the cost of having foreign players on the roster from 5500kr per player to 12 500kr per player. The move was widely condemned by league coaches, with several claiming that the Association had not consulted with the league before making the decision. Swedish national team head coach Leif Boork, however, voiced his support for the decision.

In July 2017, a number of Leksands IF players publicly raised complaints about the organisation's treatment of its women's side, including the fact that the players weren't paid and that they were expected to clean the stands after men’s games.

In August 2017, the independent North American team, the Minnesota Whitecaps, played a one-week tour in Stockholm, playing a total of four matches against the three Stockholm-based SDHL teams.

=== Regular season ===
On the 18th of November, Göteborg HC picked up their first-ever SDHL win, beating SDE Hockey by a score of 4–2. Later that month, Linköping HC set a new regular season attendance record, with 5128 fans turning out for a match against HV71.

At the 2018 Winter Olympics, held in February in Pyeongchang in Korea, a record number of SDHL players were selected to national team rosters, with 37 players from 5 different countries playing at the tournament.

=== Playoffs ===
Luleå HF/MSSK defeated Linköping HC by two games to one in the playoff finals, winning their second championship in three years.

=== Post-season ===
In April 2018, Leksands IF Dam goaltender Leon Reuterström publicly came out as a transgender man, and had to retire due to beginning testosterone therapy, which contravened anti-doping rules in Sweden.

Later in April, the Swedish national team players announced that they had unionised under the Swedish Ice Hockey Player’s Central Organization (SICO), the same union that represents the players of the men's national team and of the top-flight domestic men's league, the SHL. The union players also announced their intention to bring the SDHL players into the union in the future.

In June 2018, the SDHL and the NWHL announced that Luleå would compete in an exhibition game against the 2018 Isobel Cup winners, the Metropolitan Riveters in the first-ever Champions Cup.

== Standings ==
Each team played 36 regular season games, with three points being awarded for winning in regulation time, two points for winning in overtime or shootout, one point for losing in overtime or shootout, and zero points for losing in regulation time. At the end of the regular season, the team that finishes with the most points is crowned the regular season champion.

The top 8 clubs at the end of the regular season then go on to compete in the playoff quarterfinals in best of three elimination series. The club that advances all the way to the finals and wins is crowned the league champion. The bottom two regular season clubs must face the top Damettan teams in a qualification playoff to determine which two clubs shall compete in the SDHL the following season.

=== Regular season ===
Pos	Team	Pld	W	OTW	OTL	L	GF	GA	GD	Pts	Qualification
1	Luleå HF/MSSK	36	29	3	2	2	160	58	+102	95	Qualification to Quarter-finals
2	Linköping HC	36	26	3	3	4	135	59	+76	87	Qualification to Quarter-finals
3	Modo Hockey	36	24	5	3	4	142	58	+84	85	Qualification to Quarter-finals
4	Djurgårdens IF	36	21	4	1	10	118	71	+47	72	Qualification to Quarter-finals
5	HV71	36	15	1	3	17	94	100	−6	50	Qualification to Quarter-finals
6	Leksands IF	36	13	1	4	18	88	100	−12	45	Qualification to Quarter-finals
7	AIK	36	10	0	4	22	74	108	−34	34	Qualification to Quarter-finals
8	Brynäs IF	36	9	3	1	23	58	121	−63	34	Qualification to Quarter-finals
9	SDE Hockey	36	6	2	0	28	54	137	−83	22	Qualification to Relegation playoffs
10	Göteborg HC	36	4	1	2	29	67	178	−111	16	Qualification to Relegation playoffs

Source: SDHL.se
Rules for classification: 1) Points; 2) Goal difference; 3) Number of goals scored

== See also ==
- Women's ice hockey in Sweden
