= 2015–16 Riksserien season =

- League: (Sweden) Riksserien
- Sport: Ice hockey
- Duration: Scheduled for: September 2015 – February 2016; (Regular season); February – March 2016; (Playoffs)

Regular season
- First place: Luleå HF/MSSK
- Top scorer: Michelle Karvinen (Luleå HF/MSSK)

Playoffs

Riksserien Finals
- Champions: Luleå HF/MSSK
- Runners-up: Linköping HC

Riksserien seasons
- ← 2014-15 2016–17 →

The 2015–16 Riksserien season was the ninth season of the Swedish Women's Hockey League. The season began in September 2015 and ended in March 2016. It was the last season the league was known under the Riksserien name, changing to Svenska damhockeyligan (SDHL) the following year.

== League business ==
The fee for carrying international players on team rosters was set at 3500kr per player for the season.

In November 2015, two members of the far-right Sweden Democrats party proposed a motion in the Riksdag calling on the government to discuss financial support for women's hockey in Sweden.

== Significant events ==
=== Pre-season ===
For the 2015-16 season, the league expanded from eight to ten teams, with both HV71 and Djurgårdens IF joining the league. After facing financial difficulties, Munksund-Skuthamns SK merged with Luleå HF to form Luleå HF/MSSK.

In North America, the National Women's Hockey League was formed as the first professional women's hockey league to pay all of its players a salary. Many Swedish players chose to remain in Sweden and in Riksserien, however.

=== Regular season ===
The regular season began on the 9th of September 2015.

A Sundsvall-Modo match in late November 2015 was marked with controversy after three Sundsvall players were forced to leave the game after suffering concussions, including Canadian forward Danielle Stone. Sundsvall head coach Lars Johansson stated that he had "never experienced anything like this."

25 games into the season, Djurgården forward Andrea Dalen scored two goals to lift her season total to 34, breaking Josefine Jakobsen's record for most goals scored in a single riksserien. She would finish the year with 47 goals, a record that still stands.

In January 2016, defender Nathalie Lidman made her Riksserien debut for Luleå at the age of 14, one of the youngest players in league history to make her debut.

After Luleå star Emma Nordin injured herself while on international duty just before the playoffs, the organised a fundraising efforts to be able to afford the transfer fee to fill her spot on the roster. The club was able to raise over 50,000kr, with Swedish men's international Dick Axelsson among the notable contributors.

=== Playoffs ===
Before the start of the finals series, Linköping HC was forced to fundraise as the club's women's side lacked the budget to pay for flights to Luleå and accommodation. The club was able to collect over 20,000kr via fundraising.

Luleå HF/MSSK won the championship playoffs in their first season as a club, defeating Linköping HC 2 games to 1. The final games of the finals set a Riksserien record for attendance, with 4179 spectators present at the Coop Norrbotten Arena in Luleå.

=== Post-season ===
After losing in the finals, Linköping HC discovered that their plane tickets back from Luleå had gone missing, with head coach Peter Frantz deeming it "sabotage". After a short investigation it turned out that the club had simply forgotten to book the tickets. Frantz ended up paying for new tickets out of his own pocket at the women's team didn't have enough money left in its budget.

In April 2016, Emma Eliasson was named Riksserien Defender of the Year and was named Swedish Hockey Girl of the Year. After receiving the award, she called on the Swedish Ice Hockey Federation to change the name of the award to something less outdated.

== Standings ==
Each team played 36 regular season games, with three points being awarded for winning in regulation time, two points for winning in overtime or shootout, one point for losing in overtime or shootout, and zero points for losing in regulation time. At the end of the regular season, the team that finishes with the most points is crowned the league champion.

=== Regular season ===
Pos	Team	Pld	W	OTW	OTL	L	GF	GA	GD	Pts	Qualification
1	Luleå HF/MSSK	36	27	2	2	5	161	60	+101	87	Qualification to Quarter-finals
2	Linköping HC	36	25	5	2	4	154	60	+94	87	Qualification to Quarter-finals
3	AIK	36	21	3	3	9	95	61	+34	72	Qualification to Quarter-finals
4	Djurgårdens IF	36	21	2	2	11	130	75	+55	69	Qualification to Quarter-finals
5	Leksands IF	36	18	3	4	11	115	80	+35	64	Qualification to Quarter-finals
6	HV71	36	13	6	1	16	90	109	−19	52	Qualification to Quarter-finals
7	Brynäs IF	36	13	3	3	17	69	107	−38	48	Qualification to Quarter-finals
8	Modo Hockey	36	10	1	5	20	63	88	−25	37	Qualification to Quarter-finals
9	IF Sundsvall Hockey	36	4	1	1	30	48	185	−137	15	Qualification to Relegation playoffs
10	SDE Hockey	36	1	1	4	30	51	151	−100	9	Qualification to Relegation playoffs

Source: SDHL.se
Rules for classification: 1) Points; 2) Goal difference; 3) Number of goals scored

== See also ==
- Women's ice hockey in Sweden
