= 2018–19 SDHL season =

- League: (Sweden) SDHL
- Sport: Ice hockey
- Duration: Scheduled for: 7 September 2018 – 2 February 2020; (Regular season); February – March 2020; (Playoffs)

Regular season
- First place: Luleå HF/MSSK
- Top scorer: Michela Cava (Modo Hockey)

Playoffs

SDHL Finals
- Champions: Luleå HF/MSSK
- Runners-up: Linköping HC

SDHL seasons
- 2017-18 2019–20

The 2018–19 SDHL Season was the 12th season of the Swedish Women's Hockey League. The season began in September 2018 and ended in February 2019.

Luleå HF/MSSK were the regular season champions for the fourth season in a row, and defeated Linköping HC 3–2 in the playoff finals to be crowned playoff champions for the third time in the last four years. Göteborg HC and SDE Hockey finished at the bottom of the table, but were able to avoid relegation to Damettan in the playoffs to the SDHL.

== League business ==
=== Partnerships ===
Prior to the beginning of the season, German company Axelent announced that they would redirect their sponsorship of HV71 away from the Champions Hockey League and towards HV71's women's side, after the men's side failed to qualify for the CHL.

=== Broadcasting ===
12 regular season games were broadcast live by C More.

== Significant events ==
=== Pre-season ===
From 30 August to 2 September, the Damcup Umeå exhibition tournament was held in Umeå, in northern Sweden, between Luleå HF/MSSK, Modo Hockey, Damettan team IF Björklöven, and the Japanese national team. Luleå were crowned winners of the tournament after winning all three of their games.

At the end of September, the first Champions Cup was held in New Jersey between Luleå and the Metropolitan Riveters, the reigning NWHL champions. Luleå won the cup with a 4–2 victory, although the Riveters were missing a number of players due to injuries.

=== Post-season ===
On 31 March 2019, the Canadian Women's Hockey League announced that it was folding. In response, the league's players announced a strike movement titled ForTheGame, which led to the creation of the PWHPA. On 10 May, Kelty Apperson became the first ForTheGame player to sign a contract in Sweden, joining SDE Hockey.

In July 2019, it was announced that the 2019 4 Nations Cup was due to be held in Luleå. In September, the Cup was cancelled due to the uncertainty surrounding the Swedish players' strike as well as the events in North America.

== Standings ==
Each team played 36 regular season games, with three points being awarded for winning in regulation time, two points for winning in overtime or shootout, one point for losing in overtime or shootout, and zero points for losing in regulation time. At the end of the regular season, the team that finishes with the most points is crowned the league champion.

=== Regular season ===
Pos	Team	Pld	W	OTW	OTL	L	GF	GA	GD	Pts	Qualification
1	Luleå HF/MSSK	36	30	1	1	4	166	52	+114	93	Qualification to Quarter-finals
2	Modo Hockey	36	23	4	2	7	137	88	+49	79	Qualification to Quarter-finals
3	Linköping HC	36	24	1	1	10	137	77	+60	75	Qualification to Quarter-finals
4	Leksands IF	36	21	1	0	14	111	74	+37	65	Qualification to Quarter-finals
5	HV71	36	20	0	4	12	118	70	+48	64	Qualification to Quarter-finals
6	Djurgårdens IF	36	19	3	0	14	112	81	+31	63	Qualification to Quarter-finals
7	Brynäs IF	36	12	1	2	21	71	107	−36	40	Qualification to Quarter-finals
8	AIK	36	9	3	3	21	73	102	−29	36	Qualification to Quarter-finals
9	SDE Hockey	36	4	2	2	28	54	147	−93	18	Qualification to Relegation playoffs
10	Göteborg HC	36	1	1	2	32	31	212	−181	7	Qualification to Relegation playoffs

Source: SDHL.se
Rules for classification: 1) Points; 2) Goal difference; 3) Number of goals scored

=== Playoffs ===
Quarterfinals
1	Luleå HF/MSSK	3
8	AIK IF	0
3	Linköping HC	W
6	Djurgårdens IF	L
2	Modo Hockey	3
7	Brynäs IF	0
4	Leksands IF	1
5	HV71	3

Semifinals
1	Luleå HF/MSSK	3
5	HV71	0
2	Modo Hockey	0
3	Linköping HC	3

Finals
1	Luleå HF/MSSK	3
3	Linköping HC	2

== See also ==
- Women's ice hockey in Sweden
