= 2016–17 SDHL season =

- League: (Sweden) SDHL
- Sport: Ice hockey
- Duration: Scheduled for: September 2015 – February 2016; (Regular season); February – March 2016; (Playoffs)
- Average attendance: 179

Regular season
- First place: Luleå HF/MSSK
- Top scorer: Michelle Karvinen (Luleå HF/MSSK)

Playoffs

SDHL Finals
- Champions: Djurgårdens IF
- Runners-up: HV71

SDHL seasons
- ← 2015-16 2017–18 →

The 2016–17 SDHL season was the tenth season of the Swedish Women's Hockey League. The season began in September 2016 and ended in March 2017. It was the first season the league was known under the SDHL name, having changed from Riksserien the previous year.

== Significant events ==
=== Regular season ===
In October 2016, Luleå set a new SDHL regular season attendance record, with 3150 spectators turning up for a match against Modo Hockey, beating the previous record of 2653. The match also marked Luleå and Swedish national team star Emma Nordin's return to the ice after suffering a knee injury in the previous season. Later that month. Djurgården players launched a fundraiser for breast cancer research after the club's CEO Jenny Silfverstrand was diagnosed with the cancer.

On the 2nd of December 2016, Luleå defeated Djurgården 11-0, one of the biggest victories in SDHL history.

In December 2016, both Brynäs IF and HV71 announced initiatives to try to beat Luleå's record for attendance, after both the clubs had struggled with attendance figures early in the season. Earlier that month, Damettan club Göteborg HC had attempted to form a partnership with local men's top-flight club Frölunda with the hope of pushing the club towards promotion to the SDHL, but had been turned down.

=== Post-season ===
In May 2017, the IF Sundsvall Hockey women's side were cut, despite having managed to save their place in the SDHL during the qualification playoffs the organisation citing a need to save money for its third-tier men's side. The club was criticised for the decision, with forward Mathilda Gustafsson stating that "If we were a company instead of an association, you would never shut down a department which only employed women because the cost inhibits the male employees." The third-placed club in the qualification playoffs, Damettan club Göteborg HC were promoted to the SDHL to take their place in the 2017–18 season. SDE Hockey had finished second in the qualification playoffs, and so were able to secure their SDHL place for 2017-18.

== Standings ==
Each team played 36 regular season games, with three points being awarded for winning in regulation time, two points for winning in overtime or shootout, one point for losing in overtime or shootout, and zero points for losing in regulation time. At the end of the regular season, the team that finishes with the most points is crowned the regular season champion.

The top 8 clubs at the end of the regular season then go on to compete in the playoff quarterfinals in best of five elimination series. The club that advances all the way to the finals and wins is crowned the league champion. The bottom two regular season clubs must face the top Damettan teams in a qualification playoff to determine which two clubs shall compete in the SDHL the following season.

=== Regular season ===
Pos	Team	Pld	W	OTW	OTL	L	GF	GA	GD	Pts	Qualification
1	Luleå HF/MSSK	36	32	0	0	4	168	52	+116	96	Qualification to Quarter-finals
2	Djurgårdens IF	36	23	3	4	6	97	73	+24	79	Qualification to Quarter-finals
3	Linköping HC	36	24	2	2	8	138	75	+63	78	Qualification to Quarter-finals
4	HV71	36	15	4	5	12	89	67	+22	58	Qualification to Quarter-finals
5	AIK	36	16	3	1	16	88	82	+6	55	Qualification to Quarter-finals
6	Brynäs IF	36	14	4	3	15	78	97	−19	53	Qualification to Quarter-finals
7	Leksands IF	36	11	8	1	16	92	103	−11	50	Qualification to Quarter-finals
8	Modo Hockey	36	11	2	6	17	75	87	−12	43	Qualification to Quarter-finals
9	IF Sundsvall Hockey	36	4	0	5	27	70	164	−94	17	Qualification to Relegation playoffs
10	SDE Hockey	36	1	3	2	30	34	129	−95	11	Qualification to Relegation playoffs

Source: SDHL.se
Rules for classification: 1) Points; 2) Goal difference; 3) Number of goals scored

== See also ==
- Women's ice hockey in Sweden
