= Swedish Women's Hockey League =

Swedish Championship league in women's ice hockey

Swedish Women's Hockey League Svenska damhockeyligan (Swedish)
- Most recent season or competition: 2025–26 SDHL season
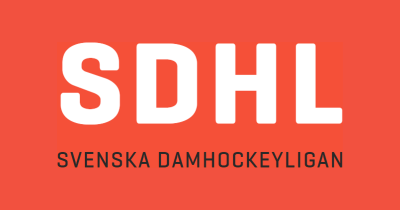
- Formerly: Riksserien (2007–2016)
- Sport: Ice hockey
- Founded: 2007
- Founder: Swedish Ice Hockey Association
- First season: 2007–08
- President: Agne Bengtsson
- No. of teams: 10
- Country: Sweden
- Most recent champion: Brynäs IF (2025-26)
- Most titles: Luleå HF/MSSK (7)
- Broadcasters: C More Sport, SVT
- Relegation to: NDHL
- Related competitions: Swedish Hockey League
- Website: www.sdhl.se

The Swedish Women's Hockey League (Swedish: Svenska damhockeyligan), abbreviated SDHL, is the elite league for women's ice hockey in Sweden. It was established in 2007 as the Riksserien by the Swedish Ice Hockey Association and was renamed prior to the 2016–17 season. The league has ten teams and employs a system of promotion and relegation with the Nationella Damhockeyligan (NDHL). The unexpected withdrawal of Göteborg HC after playing only thirteen games of the 2022–23 season caused the number of teams to decrease to nine for the remainder of that season.

Bodychecking was allowed for the 2022–23 season and goal cameras were introduced for the 2024–2025 season.

== Format ==
When a game is tied after regulation, a sudden death overtime is played with only four skaters per team for maximum 10 minutes (or 20 minutes in the playoffs). If the game is still tied after overtime, the winner is decided by game winning shots.

The regular season is a double round-robin tournament, with each team playing twice at home and twice away against every other team, resulting in a 36-game regular season per team. After the regular season, the top six teams qualify for the Women's Swedish Championship playoffs (Swedish: SM-slutspel damer). The two teams with the best regular season records in the SDHL are given a bye to the semifinals, with the remaining four qualified teams starting in the quarterfinals. In the quarterfinals, team 3 gets to pick their choice of opponent between teams 5 and 6, leaving the remaining club to meet team 4. In the semifinals the first ranked team chooses an opponent from the two winners of the quarterfinals. The playoffs are all best-of-three series, with the higher ranked team starting with one match away, followed by the remaining two at home.

The two teams with the worst records in the regular season are forced to play a qualifier to defend their spots in the SDHL against challengers from the NDHL.

== Teams ==
Location of SDHL teams in Sweden

From the formation of the SDHL in 2007, Luleå HF/MSSK have been the most successful club, winning six Swedish Championships. Luleå has been the most successful regular season team, finishing on top of the league six times. MODO Hockey was the first team from outside the Stockholm area to win the championship with their victory in 2012.

=== 2025–26 season ===
| Team | City | Arena | Head coach | Captain |
|---|---|---|---|---|
| Brynäs IF | Gävle | Monitor ERP Arena | Filip Eriksson | Julia Östlund |
| Djurgårdens IF | Stockholm | Hovet | Rickard Hårdstam | Brette Pettet |
| Frölunda HC | Gothenburg | Frölundaborg | Erika Holst | Hanna Olsson |
| Färjestad BK | Karlstad | Löfbergs Arena | Johan Fransson | Emelie Córdoba |
| HV71 | Jönköping | Husqvarna Garden | Thomas Pettersen | Emmi Rakkolainen |
| Linköping HC | Linköping | Saab Arena | Jan Bylesjö | Lindsay Agnew Svedén |
| Luleå HF/MSSK | Luleå | Coop Norrbotten Arena | Melinda Olsson | Jenni Hiirikoski |
| MoDo Hockey | Örnsköldsvik | Hägglunds Arena | Jared Cipparone | Ebba Berglund |
| SDE Hockey | Danderyd | Enebybergs Ishall | Peter Elander | Mathea Fischer |
| Skellefteå AIK | Skellefteå | Skellefteå Kraft Arena | Martin Lindh | Malou Berggren |

== Previous winners ==
=== Regular season champions ===
Riksserien

- 2008 – AIK Hockey
- 2009 – Segeltorps IF
- 2010 – Segeltorps IF
- 2011 – Segeltorps IF
- 2012 – Brynäs IF
- 2013 – MODO Hockey
- 2014 – MODO Hockey
- 2015 – Linköping HC

SDHL

- 2016 – Luleå HF/MSSK
- 2017 – Luleå HF/MSSK
- 2018 – Luleå HF/MSSK
- 2019 – Luleå HF/MSSK
- 2020 – HV71
- 2021 – Luleå HF/MSSK
- 2022 – Brynäs IF
- 2023 – Luleå HF/MSSK
- 2024 – Luleå HF/MSSK
- 2025 – Luleå HF/MSSK
- 2026 – Frölunda HC

=== Swedish Champions (playoff winners) ===
- 2008 – Segeltorps IF
- 2009 – AIK Hockey Dam
- 2010 – Segeltorps IF
- 2011 – Segeltorps IF
- 2012 – Modo Hockey
- 2013 – AIK Hockey Dam
- 2014 – Linköping HC
- 2015 – Linköping HC
- 2016 – Luleå HF/MSSK
- 2017 – Djurgårdens IF
- 2018 – Luleå HF/MSSK
- 2019 – Luleå HF/MSSK
- 2020 – Not held due to COVID-19 pandemic
- 2021 – Luleå HF/MSSK
- 2022 – Luleå HF/MSSK
- 2023 – Luleå HF/MSSK
- 2024 – Luleå HF/MSSK
- 2025 – Frölunda HC
- 2026 – Brynäs IF

== Attendance ==
While average attendance in the SDHL has been significantly lower than other professional leagues in Sweden and the Premier Hockey Federation in North America, attendance has tended towards increasing as the league receives greater investment and promotion, and as women's clubs have been less neglected by their parent organisations. There exists a considerable disparity in attendance between clubs, with Luleå HF/MSSK having led the league in attendance ever single year since the club's formation, often with almost ten time greater attendance than the worst attended club. Playoff attendance has also tended to be much higher than regular season attendance, averaging almost 900 per match in 2017–18 and 2018–19.

SDHL Regular Season Attendance
| Season | Average | Highest | Lowest |
|---|---|---|---|
| 2013–14 Riksserien season | 114 | Munksund Skuthamn SK (205) | Segeltorps IF (59) |
| 2014–15 Riksserien season | 102 | Munksund Skuthamn SK (132) | IF Sundsvall Hockey (54) |
| 2015–16 Riksserien season | 141 | Luleå HF/MSSK (468) | IF Sundsvall Hockey (57) |
| 2016–17 SDHL season | 179 | Luleå HF/MSSK (542) | SDE Hockey (54) |
| 2017–18 SDHL season | 192 | Luleå HF/MSSK (442) | SDE Hockey (65) |
| 2018–19 SDHL season | 234 | Luleå HF/MSSK (831) | SDE Hockey (42) |
| 2019–20 SDHL season | 178 | Luleå HF/MSSK (539) | SDE Hockey (48) |

== League records ==
As of 21 March 2023

=== Individual records ===
- Most goals in a season: Andrea Dalen, 47 goals (36 games, 2015–16)
- Most assists in a season: Lara Stalder, 55 assists (33 games, 2021–22)
- Most points in a season: Lara Stalder, 89 points (33 games, 2021–22)
- Most points in a season, defenceman: Sidney Morin, 65 points (36 games, 2020–21)
- Most penalty minutes in a season: Jenn Wakefield, 90 PIM (31 games, 2020–21)
- Most shutouts in a season: Florence Schelling, 10 shutouts (31 games, 2017–18)
- Best save percentage in a season, minimum 1/3 of games played: Kim Martin Hasson, .956 (17 games, 2014–15)
- Beat goals against average in a season, minimum 1/3 of games played: Frida Axell, 1.00 GAA (14 games, 2022–23)

=== Club records ===
- Most points in a season: 99, HV71 in 2019–20
- Highest attendance in a regular season match: 6,220 – Luleå HF/MSSK vs. AIK Hockey, 16 November 2018
- Highest attendance in a playoff match: 7,765 – Brynäs IF vs. Luleå HF/MSSK at Monitor ERP Arena, 7 April 2022 (Game 5 of the 2022 Swedish Championship finals)

=== All-time leading scorers ===
The top-ten point-scorers (goals + assists) in SDHL history.

Note: Nat = Nationality; Pos = Position; GP = Games played; G = Goals; A = Assists; Pts = Points; P/G = Points per game

Points
| Nat | Player | Pos | GP | G | A | Pts | P/G |
|---|---|---|---|---|---|---|---|
| (Austria) | Denise Altmann | RW | 337 | 277 | 286 | 563 | 1.67 |
| (Sweden) | Emma Nordin | C | 406 | 227 | 281 | 508 | 1.25 |
| (Switzerland) | Lara Stalder | C | 191 | 180 | 222 | 402 | 2.10 |
| (Sweden) | Erika Grahm | LW/C | 385 | 179 | 212 | 391 | 1.02 |
| (Sweden) | Lisa Johansson | RW/LW | 456 | 232 | 157 | 389 | 0.85 |
| (Norway) | Line Bialik Øien | LW/RW | 322 | 186 | 200 | 386 | 1.20 |
| (Norway) | Andrea Schjelderup Dalen | LW | 283 | 199 | 145 | 344 | 1.22 |
| (Denmark) | Josefine Jakobsen | C | 307 | 158 | 185 | 343 | 1.12 |
| (Sweden) | Anna Borgqvist | C/LW | 371 | 141 | 197 | 338 | 0.91 |
| (Sweden) | Fanny Rask | LW | 397 | 142 | 192 | 334 | 0.84 |

== See also ==
- Women's ice hockey in Sweden
- List of SDHL seasons
- Sweden women's national ice hockey team
- Swedish Ice Hockey Association
