= Ice hockey at the 2022 Winter Olympics – Women's team rosters =

These are the team rosters of the nations participating in the women's ice hockey tournament of the 2022 Winter Olympics.

Age and clubs listed as of the start of the tournament, 3 February 2022.

== Group A ==
=== Canada ===
Canada's women's hockey team of 23 athletes was named on 11 January 2022. The team consisted of 13 forwards (F), seven on defense (D) and three goaltenders (G).

Head coach: Troy Ryan

No.	Pos.	Name	Height	Weight	Birthdate	Team
3	D	Jocelyne Larocque	1.68 m (5 ft 6 in)	66 kg (146 lb)	19 May 1988 (aged 33)	(Canada) PWHPA Toronto
6	F	Rebecca Johnston	1.75 m (5 ft 9 in)	67 kg (148 lb)	24 September 1989 (aged 32)	(Canada) PWHPA Calgary
7	F	Laura Stacey	1.78 m (5 ft 10 in)	71 kg (157 lb)	5 May 1994 (aged 27)	(Canada) PWHPA Montreal
10	F	Sarah Fillier	1.63 m (5 ft 4 in)	59 kg (130 lb)	9 June 2000 (aged 21)	(United States) Princeton Tigers
11	F	Jillian Saulnier	1.65 m (5 ft 5 in)	66 kg (146 lb)	7 March 1992 (aged 29)	(Canada) PWHPA Montreal
14	D	Renata Fast	1.70 m (5 ft 7 in)	65 kg (143 lb)	6 October 1994 (aged 27)	(Canada) PWHPA Toronto
15	F	Mélodie Daoust	1.63 m (5 ft 4 in)	71 kg (157 lb)	7 January 1992 (aged 30)	(Canada) PWHPA Montreal
17	D	Ella Shelton	1.73 m (5 ft 8 in)	68 kg (150 lb)	19 January 1998 (aged 24)	(Canada) PWHPA Toronto
19	F	Brianne Jenner – A	1.75 m (5 ft 9 in)	71 kg (157 lb)	4 May 1991 (aged 30)	(Canada) PWHPA Toronto
20	F	Sarah Nurse	1.75 m (5 ft 9 in)	67 kg (148 lb)	4 January 1995 (aged 27)	(Canada) PWHPA Toronto
21	D	Ashton Bell	1.73 m (5 ft 8 in)	64 kg (141 lb)	7 December 1999 (aged 22)	(United States) Minnesota Duluth Bulldogs
23	D	Erin Ambrose	1.65 m (5 ft 5 in)	60 kg (130 lb)	30 April 1994 (aged 27)	(Canada) PWHPA Toronto
24	F	Natalie Spooner	1.78 m (5 ft 10 in)	82 kg (181 lb)	17 October 1990 (aged 31)	(Canada) PWHPA Toronto
26	F	Emily Clark	1.70 m (5 ft 7 in)	61 kg (134 lb)	28 November 1995 (aged 26)	(Canada) PWHPA Montreal
27	F	Emma Maltais	1.63 m (5 ft 4 in)	66 kg (146 lb)	4 November 1999 (aged 22)	(United States) Ohio State Buckeyes
28	D	Micah Zandee-Hart	1.73 m (5 ft 8 in)	68 kg (150 lb)	13 January 1997 (aged 25)	(Canada) PWHPA Calgary
29	F	Marie-Philip Poulin – C	1.70 m (5 ft 7 in)	73 kg (161 lb)	28 March 1991 (aged 30)	(Canada) PWHPA Montreal
35	G	Ann-Renée Desbiens	1.75 m (5 ft 9 in)	73 kg (161 lb)	10 April 1994 (aged 27)	(Canada) PWHPA Montreal
38	G	Emerance Maschmeyer	1.68 m (5 ft 6 in)	64 kg (141 lb)	5 October 1994 (aged 27)	(Canada) PWHPA Montreal
40	F	Blayre Turnbull – A	1.70 m (5 ft 7 in)	69 kg (152 lb)	15 July 1993 (aged 28)	(Canada) PWHPA Calgary
42	D	Claire Thompson	1.72 m (5 ft 8 in)	60 kg (130 lb)	28 January 1998 (aged 24)	(Canada) PWHPA Toronto
47	F	Jamie Lee Rattray	1.68 m (5 ft 6 in)	78 kg (172 lb)	30 September 1992 (aged 29)	(Canada) PWHPA Toronto
50	G	Kristen Campbell	1.78 m (5 ft 10 in)	80 kg (180 lb)	30 November 1997 (aged 24)	(Canada) PWHPA Calgary

=== Finland ===
The roster was announced on 20 January 2022.

Head coach: Pasi Mustonen

No.	Pos.	Name	Height	Weight	Birthdate	Team
1	G	Eveliina Mäkinen	1.75 m (5 ft 9 in)	68 kg (150 lb)	12 April 1995 (aged 26)	(Sweden) Brynäs IF
2	D	Sini Karjalainen	1.74 m (5 ft 9 in)	68 kg (150 lb)	30 January 1999 (aged 23)	(United States) Vermont Catamounts
6	D	Jenni Hiirikoski	1.62 m (5 ft 4 in)	62 kg (137 lb)	30 March 1987 (aged 34)	(Sweden) Luleå HF
7	D	Sanni Rantala	1.73 m (5 ft 8 in)	63 kg (139 lb)	8 July 2002 (aged 19)	(Finland) Kiekko-Espoo
8	D	Ella Viitasuo	1.72 m (5 ft 8 in)	69 kg (152 lb)	27 May 1996 (aged 25)	(Finland) Kiekko-Espoo
9	D	Nelli Laitinen	1.69 m (5 ft 7 in)	62 kg (137 lb)	29 April 2002 (aged 19)	(Finland) Kiekko-Espoo
10	F	Elisa Holopainen	1.66 m (5 ft 5 in)	58 kg (128 lb)	27 December 2001 (aged 20)	(Finland) Kiekko-Espoo
12	F	Sanni Vanhanen	1.65 m (5 ft 5 in)	57 kg (126 lb)	1 July 2005 (aged 16)	(Finland) Tappara U16
15	D	Minttu Tuominen	1.65 m (5 ft 5 in)	73 kg (161 lb)	26 June 1990 (aged 31)	(Finland) Kiekko-Espoo
16	F	Petra Nieminen	1.69 m (5 ft 7 in)	68 kg (150 lb)	4 May 1999 (aged 22)	(Sweden) Luleå HF
18	G	Meeri Räisänen	1.70 m (5 ft 7 in)	66 kg (146 lb)	2 December 1989 (aged 32)	(Finland) JYP U20 Akatemia
23	F	Sanni Hakala	1.54 m (5 ft 1 in)	54 kg (119 lb)	31 October 1997 (aged 24)	(Sweden) HV71
24	F	Viivi Vainikka	1.66 m (5 ft 5 in)	67 kg (148 lb)	23 December 2001 (aged 20)	(Sweden) Luleå HF
27	F	Julia Liikala	1.66 m (5 ft 5 in)	63 kg (139 lb)	20 March 2001 (aged 20)	(Finland) HIFK
28	F	Jenniina Nylund	1.71 m (5 ft 7 in)	64 kg (141 lb)	18 June 1999 (aged 22)	(United States) St. Cloud State Huskies
32	F	Emilia Vesa	1.77 m (5 ft 10 in)	66 kg (146 lb)	3 January 2001 (aged 21)	(Finland) Kiekko-Espoo
33	F	Michelle Karvinen	1.67 m (5 ft 6 in)	65 kg (143 lb)	27 March 1990 (aged 31)	(Sweden) Malmö Redhawks
34	F	Sofianna Sundelin	1.69 m (5 ft 7 in)	55 kg (121 lb)	13 January 2003 (aged 19)	(Finland) Team Kuortane
36	G	Anni Keisala	1.75 m (5 ft 9 in)	80 kg (180 lb)	5 April 1997 (aged 24)	(Finland) Ilves
40	F	Noora Tulus	1.65 m (5 ft 5 in)	56 kg (123 lb)	15 August 1995 (aged 26)	(Sweden) Luleå HF
61	F	Tanja Niskanen	1.76 m (5 ft 9 in)	72 kg (159 lb)	11 September 1992 (aged 29)	(Finland) KalPa
77	F	Susanna Tapani	1.77 m (5 ft 10 in)	68 kg (150 lb)	2 March 1993 (aged 28)	(China) KRS Vanke Rays
88	D	Ronja Savolainen	1.77 m (5 ft 10 in)	75 kg (165 lb)	29 November 1997 (aged 24)	(Sweden) Luleå HF

=== ROC ===
A 23-player roster was announced on 24 January 2022. The roster submitted in the ROC's preliminary application on 2 February featured only nineteen players. Due to positive COVID-19 test results, previously named goaltender Diana Farkhutdinova, defencemen Angelina Goncharenko and Yekaterina Nikolayeva, and forwards Liudmila Belyakova and captain Olga Sosina were removed and reserve forward Polina Luchnikova was added to the roster. Goaltender Valeria Merkusheva and defenceman Maria Batalova were expected join the team in Beijing on 3 February. On 3 February, defenceman Yulia Smirnova and forward Landysh Falyakhova were registered and, on 5 February, Maria Batalova was registered and both Angelina Goncharenko and Olga Sosina returned to the official roster.

Head coach: Yevgeni Bobariko

No.	Pos.	Name	Height	Weight	Birthdate	Team
2	D	Angelina Goncharenko	1.78 m (5 ft 10 in)	73 kg (161 lb)	23 May 1994 (aged 27)	(Russia) SKIF Nizhny Novgorod
4	D	Yulia Smirnova	1.63 m (5 ft 4 in)	55 kg (121 lb)	8 May 1998 (aged 23)	(Russia) Dynamo-Neva St. Petersburg
10	F	Liudmila Belyakova	1.70 m (5 ft 7 in)	65 kg (143 lb)	12 August 1994 (aged 27)	(Russia) HC Tornado
11	D	Liana Ganeyeva	1.65 m (5 ft 5 in)	62 kg (137 lb)	20 December 1997 (aged 24)	(Russia) Dynamo-Neva St. Petersburg
12	D	Maria Pechnikova	1.78 m (5 ft 10 in)	60 kg (130 lb)	8 June 1992 (aged 29)	(Russia) Agidel Ufa
13	D	Nina Pirogova	1.73 m (5 ft 8 in)	60 kg (130 lb)	26 January 1999 (aged 23)	(Russia) HC Tornado
15	F	Valeria Pavlova	1.78 m (5 ft 10 in)	78 kg (172 lb)	15 April 1995 (aged 26)	(Russia) Biryusa Krasnoyarsk
17	F	Fanuza Kadirova	1.61 m (5 ft 3 in)	59 kg (130 lb)	6 April 1998 (aged 23)	(Russia) Dynamo-Neva St. Petersburg
18	F	Olga Sosina	1.63 m (5 ft 4 in)	76 kg (168 lb)	27 July 1992 (aged 29)	(Russia) Agidel Ufa
19	D	Yelena Provorova	1.65 m (5 ft 5 in)	63 kg (139 lb)	22 November 2001 (aged 20)	(Russia) SKIF Nizhny Novgorod
21	F	Polina Bolgareva	1.67 m (5 ft 6 in)	65 kg (143 lb)	6 February 1999 (aged 22)	(Russia) Dynamo-Neva St. Petersburg
22	D	Maria Batalova	1.73 m (5 ft 8 in)	65 kg (143 lb)	3 May 1996 (aged 25)	(Russia) Agidel Ufa
23	G	Daria Gredzen	1.76 m (5 ft 9 in)	68 kg (150 lb)	23 March 2004 (aged 17)	(Russia) Biryusa Krasnoyarsk
26	F	Yekaterina Dobrodeyeva	1.59 m (5 ft 3 in)	58 kg (128 lb)	10 December 1999 (aged 22)	(Russia) Biryusa Krasnoyarsk
27	F	Veronika Korzhakova	1.68 m (5 ft 6 in)	64 kg (141 lb)	9 June 2003 (aged 18)	(Russia) Agidel Ufa
29	F	Alexandra Vafina – A	1.64 m (5 ft 5 in)	57 kg (126 lb)	28 July 1990 (age 35)	(Russia) Dynamo-Neva St. Petersburg
30	G	Valeria Merkusheva	1.68 m (5 ft 6 in)	66 kg (146 lb)	20 September 1999 (age 26)	(Russia) SKIF Nizhny Novgorod
42	F	Oxana Bratisheva	1.65 m (5 ft 5 in)	54 kg (119 lb)	5 June 2000 (aged 21)	(Russia) SKIF Nizhny Novgorod
59	F	Yelena Dergachyova	1.59 m (5 ft 3 in)	55 kg (121 lb)	8 November 1995 (aged 26)	(Russia) HC Tornado
69	G	Maria Sorokina	1.66 m (5 ft 5 in)	65 kg (143 lb)	19 August 1995 (aged 26)	(Russia) Agidel Ufa
70	D	Anna Shibanova – A	1.63 m (5 ft 4 in)	63 kg (139 lb)	10 November 1994 (aged 27)	(Russia) Agidel Ufa
72	D	Anna Savonina	1.63 m (5 ft 4 in)	63 kg (139 lb)	5 December 2001 (aged 20)	(Russia) HC Tornado
73	F	Viktoria Kulishova	1.70 m (5 ft 7 in)	57 kg (126 lb)	12 August 1999 (aged 22)	(Russia) SKIF Nizhny Novgorod
76	D	Yekaterina Nikolayeva	1.66 m (5 ft 5 in)	69 kg (152 lb)	5 October 1995 (aged 26)	(Russia) HC St. Petersburg
79	F	Landysh Falyakhova	1.58 m (5 ft 2 in)	54 kg (119 lb)	31 August 1998 (aged 23)	(Russia) SKIF Nizhny Novgorod
87	F	Polina Luchnikova	1.67 m (5 ft 6 in)	68 kg (150 lb)	30 January 2002 (aged 20)	(Russia) Agidel Ufa
97	F	Anna Shokhina – C	1.68 m (5 ft 6 in)	67 kg (148 lb)	23 June 1997 (aged 24)	(Russia) HC Tornado

=== Switzerland ===
The roster was announced on 14 January 2022.

Head coach: Colin Muller

No.	Pos.	Name	Height	Weight	Birthdate	Team
3	D	Sarah Forster	1.68 m (5 ft 6 in)	66 kg (146 lb)	19 March 1993 (aged 28)	(Sweden) AIK IF
7	F	Lara Stalder	1.67 m (5 ft 6 in)	63 kg (139 lb)	15 May 1994 (aged 27)	(Sweden) Brynäs IF
8	F	Kaleigh Quennec	1.72 m (5 ft 8 in)	80 kg (180 lb)	15 February 1998 (aged 23)	(Canada) Montreal Carabins
9	D	Shannon Sigrist	1.67 m (5 ft 6 in)	68 kg (150 lb)	20 April 1999 (aged 22)	(Sweden) Linköping HC
12	F	Lisa Rüedi	1.67 m (5 ft 6 in)	67 kg (148 lb)	3 November 2000 (aged 21)	(Switzerland) ZSC Lions
14	F	Evelina Raselli	1.70 m (5 ft 7 in)	61 kg (134 lb)	3 May 1992 (aged 29)	(United States) Boston Pride
15	F	Laura Zimmermann	1.63 m (5 ft 4 in)	69 kg (152 lb)	5 April 2003 (aged 18)	(Switzerland) EV Bomo Thun
16	D	Nicole Vallario	1.66 m (5 ft 5 in)	66 kg (146 lb)	30 August 2001 (aged 20)	(United States) St. Thomas Tommies
17	D	Lara Christen	1.63 m (5 ft 4 in)	64 kg (141 lb)	2 October 2002 (aged 19)	(Switzerland) ZSC Lions
18	D	Stefanie Wetli	1.73 m (5 ft 8 in)	67 kg (148 lb)	4 February 2000 (aged 21)	(Switzerland) HT Thurgau Ladies
20	G	Andrea Brändli	1.67 m (5 ft 6 in)	72 kg (159 lb)	5 June 1997 (aged 24)	(United States) Ohio State Buckeyes
21	F	Rahel Enzler	1.63 m (5 ft 4 in)	66 kg (146 lb)	30 July 2000 (aged 21)	(United States) Maine Black Bears
22	D	Sinja Leemann	1.66 m (5 ft 5 in)	60 kg (130 lb)	19 April 2002 (aged 19)	(Switzerland) ZSC Lions
23	D	Nicole Bullo	1.60 m (5 ft 3 in)	54 kg (119 lb)	18 July 1987 (aged 34)	(Switzerland) HC Ladies Lugano
24	F	Noemi Ryhner	1.65 m (5 ft 5 in)	62 kg (137 lb)	24 April 2000 (aged 21)	(Sweden) Luleå HF/MSSK
25	F	Alina Müller	1.67 m (5 ft 6 in)	65 kg (143 lb)	12 March 1998 (aged 23)	(United States) Northeastern Huskies
26	F	Dominique Rüegg	1.73 m (5 ft 8 in)	79 kg (174 lb)	5 February 1996 (aged 25)	(Switzerland) ZSC Lions
28	F	Alina Marti	1.67 m (5 ft 6 in)	66 kg (146 lb)	23 April 2004 (aged 17)	(Switzerland) ZSC Lions
29	G	Saskia Maurer	1.66 m (5 ft 5 in)	59 kg (130 lb)	29 July 2001 (aged 20)	(United States) St. Thomas Tommies
39	G	Caroline Spies	1.68 m (5 ft 6 in)	66 kg (146 lb)	2 July 2002 (aged 19)	(Switzerland) EHC Basel
71	F	Lena Lutz	1.66 m (5 ft 5 in)	68 kg (150 lb)	12 July 2001 (aged 20)	(Switzerland) HC Ladies Lugano
88	F	Phoebe Stänz	1.61 m (5 ft 3 in)	58 kg (128 lb)	7 January 1994 (aged 28)	(Sweden) Leksands IF
98	F	Keely Moy	1.75 m (5 ft 9 in)	74 kg (163 lb)	23 April 1998 (aged 23)	(United States) Harvard Crimson

=== United States ===
The roster was announced on 2 January 2022.

Head coach: Joel Johnson

No.	Pos.	Name	Height	Weight	Birthdate	Birthplace	Team
2	D	Lee Stecklein	1.83 m (6 ft 0 in)	77 kg (170 lb)	23 April 1994 (aged 27)	Roseville, Minnesota	(United States) PWHPA Minnesota
3	D	Cayla Barnes	1.57 m (5 ft 2 in)	63 kg (139 lb)	7 January 1999 (aged 23)	Corona, California	(United States) Boston College Eagles
4	D	Caroline Harvey	1.70 m (5 ft 7 in)	73 kg (161 lb)	14 October 2002 (aged 19)	Pelham, New Hampshire	(United States) North American Hockey Academy
5	D	Megan Keller	1.80 m (5 ft 11 in)	75 kg (165 lb)	1 May 1996 (aged 25)	Farmington Hills, Michigan	(United States) PWHPA New Hampshire
9	D	Megan Bozek	1.73 m (5 ft 8 in)	80 kg (180 lb)	27 March 1991 (aged 30)	Buffalo Grove, Illinois	(China) KRS Vanke Rays
11	F	Abby Roque	1.70 m (5 ft 7 in)	82 kg (181 lb)	25 September 1997 (aged 24)	Sault Ste. Marie, Michigan	(United States) PWHPA Minnesota
12	F	Kelly Pannek	1.73 m (5 ft 8 in)	75 kg (165 lb)	29 December 1995 (aged 26)	Plymouth, Minnesota	(United States) PWHPA Minnesota
13	F	Grace Zumwinkle	1.75 m (5 ft 9 in)	75 kg (165 lb)	23 April 1999 (aged 22)	Excelsior, Minnesota	(United States) Minnesota Golden Gophers
14	F	Brianna Decker *	1.63 m (5 ft 4 in)	67 kg (148 lb)	13 May 1991 (aged 30)	Dousman, Wisconsin	(United States) PWHPA New Hampshire
15	D	Savannah Harmon	1.60 m (5 ft 3 in)	67 kg (148 lb)	27 October 1995 (aged 26)	Downers Grove, Illinois	(United States) PWHPA Minnesota
16	F	Hayley Scamurra	1.73 m (5 ft 8 in)	73 kg (161 lb)	14 December 1994 (aged 27)	Buffalo, New York	(United States) PWHPA New Hampshire
18	F	Jesse Compher	1.73 m (5 ft 8 in)	68 kg (150 lb)	1 July 1999 (aged 22)	Northbrook, Illinois	(United States) Boston University Terriers
19	D	Jincy Roese	1.68 m (5 ft 6 in)	70 kg (150 lb)	15 May 1997 (aged 24)	O'Fallon, Missouri	(United States) PWHPA New Hampshire
20	F	Hannah Brandt	1.68 m (5 ft 6 in)	68 kg (150 lb)	27 November 1993 (aged 28)	Vadnais Heights, Minnesota	(United States) PWHPA Minnesota
21	F	Hilary Knight	1.80 m (5 ft 11 in)	78 kg (172 lb)	12 July 1989 (aged 32)	Sun Valley, Idaho	(United States) PWHPA Minnesota
24	F	Dani Cameranesi	1.65 m (5 ft 5 in)	70 kg (150 lb)	30 June 1995 (aged 26)	Plymouth, Minnesota	(United States) PWHPA Minnesota
25	F	Alex Carpenter	1.70 m (5 ft 7 in)	70 kg (150 lb)	13 April 1994 (aged 27)	North Reading, Massachusetts	(China) KRS Vanke Rays
26	F	Kendall Coyne Schofield – C	1.57 m (5 ft 2 in)	57 kg (126 lb)	25 May 1992 (aged 29)	Palos Heights, Illinois	(United States) PWHPA Minnesota
28	F	Amanda Kessel	1.68 m (5 ft 6 in)	59 kg (130 lb)	28 August 1991 (aged 30)	Madison, Wisconsin	(United States) PWHPA New Hampshire
29	G	Nicole Hensley	1.68 m (5 ft 6 in)	70 kg (150 lb)	23 June 1994 (aged 27)	Lakewood, Colorado	(United States) PWHPA New Hampshire
33	G	Alex Cavallini	1.70 m (5 ft 7 in)	70 kg (150 lb)	3 January 1992 (aged 30)	Delafield, Wisconsin	(United States) PWHPA Minnesota
35	G	Maddie Rooney	1.65 m (5 ft 5 in)	66 kg (146 lb)	7 July 1997 (aged 24)	Andover, Minnesota	(United States) PWHPA Minnesota
37	F	Abbey Murphy	1.65 m (5 ft 5 in)	66 kg (146 lb)	14 April 2002 (aged 19)	Evergreen Park, Illinois	(United States) Minnesota Golden Gophers

* Missed the remainder of the tournament after a knee injury in the first preliminary round game on February 3.

== Group B ==
=== China ===
The roster was announced on 28 January 2022.

Head coach : (United States) Brian Idalski

No.	Pos.	Names	Height	Weight	Birthdate	Team
2	D	Yu Baiwei	1.66 m (5 ft 5 in)	66 kg (146 lb)	17 July 1988 (aged 33)	(China) KRS Vanke Rays
5	D	Camryn Wong	1.62 m (5 ft 4 in)	61 kg (134 lb)	5 September 2000 (aged 21)	(China) KRS Vanke Rays
7	F	Zhang Mengying	1.70 m (5 ft 7 in)	68 kg (150 lb)	22 December 1993 (aged 28)	(China) KRS Vanke Rays
8	F	Leah Lum	1.65 m (5 ft 5 in)	64 kg (141 lb)	12 May 1996 (aged 25)	(China) KRS Vanke Rays
10	F	He Xin	1.68 m (5 ft 6 in)	58 kg (128 lb)	24 July 1996 (aged 25)	(China) KRS Vanke Rays
15	F	Maddie Woo	1.72 m (5 ft 8 in)	69 kg (152 lb)	24 September 1994 (aged 27)	(China) KRS Vanke Rays
17	F	Kassy Betinol	1.62 m (5 ft 4 in)	67 kg (148 lb)	14 June 2001 (aged 20)	(China) KRS Vanke Rays
19	F	Taylor Lum	1.60 m (5 ft 3 in)	61 kg (134 lb)	1 April 2002 (aged 19)	(China) KRS Vanke Rays
23	F	Fang Xin	1.70 m (5 ft 7 in)	54 kg (119 lb)	10 May 1994 (aged 27)	(China) KRS Vanke Rays
24	G	Wang Yuqing	1.69 m (5 ft 7 in)	59 kg (130 lb)	6 May 1994 (aged 27)	(China) KRS Vanke Rays
26	F	Guan Yingying	1.67 m (5 ft 6 in)	62 kg (137 lb)	13 September 1995 (aged 26)	(China) KRS Vanke Rays
28	D	Anna Fairman	1.69 m (5 ft 7 in)	62 kg (137 lb)	13 October 2000 (aged 21)	(China) KRS Vanke Rays
33	G	Kimberly Newell	1.75 m (5 ft 9 in)	65 kg (143 lb)	4 October 1995 (aged 26)	(China) KRS Vanke Rays
34	F	Hannah Miller	1.75 m (5 ft 9 in)	75 kg (165 lb)	16 February 1996 (aged 25)	(China) KRS Vanke Rays
44	F	Rebekah Kolstad	1.78 m (5 ft 10 in)	84 kg (185 lb)	21 January 1997 (aged 25)	(China) KRS Vanke Rays
49	D	Jessica Wong	1.70 m (5 ft 7 in)	67 kg (148 lb)	29 March 1991 (aged 30)	(China) KRS Vanke Rays
51	F	Anna Segedi	1.65 m (5 ft 5 in)	63 kg (139 lb)	20 December 2000 (aged 21)	(China) KRS Vanke Rays
66	D	Li Qianhua	1.65 m (5 ft 5 in)	65 kg (143 lb)	6 June 2002 (aged 19)	(China) KRS Vanke Rays
88	G	Tia Chan	1.67 m (5 ft 6 in)	68 kg (150 lb)	3 September 2002 (aged 19)	(China) KRS Vanke Rays
91	F	Rachel Llanes	1.60 m (5 ft 3 in)	58 kg (128 lb)	29 April 1991 (aged 30)	(China) KRS Vanke Rays
93	D	Liu Zhixin	1.79 m (5 ft 10 in)	78 kg (172 lb)	25 April 1993 (aged 28)	(China) KRS Vanke Rays
97	D	Zhao Qinan	1.70 m (5 ft 7 in)	60 kg (130 lb)	29 September 1997 (aged 24)	(China) KRS Vanke Rays
98	F	Zhu Rui	1.62 m (5 ft 4 in)	58 kg (128 lb)	23 April 1998 (aged 23)	(China) KRS Vanke Rays

=== Czech Republic ===
The roster was announced on 13 January 2022.

Head coach: Tomáš Pacina

No.	Pos.	Name	Height	Weight	Birthdate	Team
1	G	Viktorie Švejdová	1.68 m (5 ft 6 in)	65 kg (143 lb)	24 June 2002 (aged 19)	(Sweden) Modo Hockey
2	D	Aneta Tejralová	1.64 m (5 ft 5 in)	53 kg (117 lb)	4 January 1996 (aged 26)	(Russia) SKIF Nizhny Novgorod
4	D	Daniela Pejšová	1.73 m (5 ft 8 in)	73 kg (161 lb)	14 August 2002 (aged 19)	(Sweden) Modo Hockey
5	D	Samantha Kolowratová	1.70 m (5 ft 7 in)	71 kg (157 lb)	12 July 1996 (aged 25)	(Sweden) Brynäs IF
7	F	Lenka Serdar	1.72 m (5 ft 8 in)	63 kg (139 lb)	21 July 1997 (aged 24)	(Sweden) Linköping HC
9	F	Alena Mills – C	1.73 m (5 ft 8 in)	80 kg (180 lb)	9 June 1990 (aged 31)	(China) KRS Vanke Rays
10	F	Denisa Křížová	1.65 m (5 ft 5 in)	68 kg (150 lb)	3 November 1994 (aged 27)	(Sweden) Brynäs IF
12	F	Klára Hymlárová	1.62 m (5 ft 4 in)	67 kg (148 lb)	27 February 1999 (aged 22)	(United States) St. Cloud State Huskies
14	D	Dominika Lásková	1.64 m (5 ft 5 in)	71 kg (157 lb)	20 December 1996 (aged 25)	(United States) Merrimack Warriors
15	F	Aneta Lédlová	1.68 m (5 ft 6 in)	76 kg (168 lb)	31 December 1996 (aged 25)	(Czech Republic) SK Trhači Kadaň
16	F	Kateřina Mrázová	1.63 m (5 ft 4 in)	64 kg (141 lb)	19 October 1992 (aged 29)	(Sweden) Brynäs IF
17	D	Pavlína Horálková	1.66 m (5 ft 5 in)	61 kg (134 lb)	24 May 1991 (aged 30)	(Russia) Biryusa Krasnoyarsk
18	F	Michaela Pejzlová	1.70 m (5 ft 7 in)	66 kg (146 lb)	4 June 1997 (aged 24)	(Finland) HIFK
19	F	Natálie Mlýnková	1.61 m (5 ft 3 in)	63 kg (139 lb)	24 May 2001 (aged 20)	(United States) Vermont Catamounts
21	F	Tereza Vanišová	1.70 m (5 ft 7 in)	64 kg (141 lb)	30 January 1996 (aged 26)	(Sweden) Leksands IF
23	F	Kateřina Bukolská	1.70 m (5 ft 7 in)	70 kg (150 lb)	6 March 1997 (aged 24)	(Sweden) Leksands IF
24	D	Sára Čajanová	1.68 m (5 ft 6 in)	63 kg (139 lb)	10 December 2002 (aged 19)	(Czech Republic) HC Bobři Valašské Meziříčí
25	F	Kristýna Pátková	1.67 m (5 ft 6 in)	69 kg (152 lb)	17 June 1998 (aged 23)	(United States) Vermont Catamounts
26	F	Vendula Přibylová	1.71 m (5 ft 7 in)	78 kg (172 lb)	23 March 1996 (aged 25)	(Sweden) AIK IF
27	D	Tereza Radová	1.72 m (5 ft 8 in)	73 kg (161 lb)	22 November 2001 (aged 20)	(Sweden) Göteborg HC
28	F	Noemi Neubauerová	1.73 m (5 ft 8 in)	69 kg (152 lb)	15 December 1999 (aged 22)	(United States) Colgate Raiders
29	G	Klára Peslarová	1.64 m (5 ft 5 in)	63 kg (139 lb)	23 November 1996 (aged 25)	(Sweden) Modo Hockey
30	G	Kateřina Zechovská	1.65 m (5 ft 5 in)	78 kg (172 lb)	4 November 1998 (aged 23)	(Czech Republic) HC Draci Bílina

=== Denmark ===
The roster was announced on 10 January 2022.

Head coach: (Sweden) Peter Elander

No.	Pos.	Name	Height	Weight	Birthdate	Team
2	D	Kristine Melberg Hansen	1.69 m (5 ft 7 in)	69 kg (152 lb)	28 December 2000 (aged 21)	(Sweden) IF Malmö
4	F	Silke Lave Glud	1.75 m (5 ft 9 in)	65 kg (143 lb)	3 March 1996 (aged 25)	(Denmark) Rødovre SIK
8	F	Josefine Persson	1.76 m (5 ft 9 in)	69 kg (152 lb)	28 March 1994 (aged 27)	(Sweden) Luleå HF
11	D	Amalie Andersen	1.73 m (5 ft 8 in)	73 kg (161 lb)	6 October 1999 (aged 22)	(United States) Maine Black Bears
13	F	Michele Brix Nielsen	1.69 m (5 ft 7 in)	75 kg (165 lb)	10 July 1996 (aged 25)	(Denmark) Odense IK
14	F	Nicoline Jensen – A	1.65 m (5 ft 5 in)	65 kg (143 lb)	8 November 1992 (aged 29)	(Sweden) HV71
15	D	Amanda Refsgaard	1.75 m (5 ft 9 in)	63 kg (139 lb)	8 March 2001 (aged 20)	(Denmark) Rødovre SIK
17	F	Sofia Skriver	1.65 m (5 ft 5 in)	60 kg (130 lb)	7 June 2003 (aged 18)	(Sweden) Luleå HF
18	F	Maria Holm Peters	1.68 m (5 ft 6 in)	60 kg (130 lb)	16 September 1999 (aged 22)	(Denmark) Odense IK
19	D	Josephine Asperup	1.63 m (5 ft 4 in)	64 kg (141 lb)	21 July 1992 (aged 29)	(Sweden) IF Malmö
21	F	Michelle Weis	1.69 m (5 ft 7 in)	59 kg (130 lb)	10 April 1997 (aged 24)	(United States) Maine Black Bears
22	D	Sofie Skott Dahl	1.72 m (5 ft 8 in)	62 kg (137 lb)	14 June 2002 (aged 19)	(Denmark) Hvidovre IK
23	F	Julie Oksbjerg	1.78 m (5 ft 10 in)	67 kg (148 lb)	2 December 2000 (aged 21)	(Denmark) Odense IK
27	F	Lilli Friis-Hansen	1.63 m (5 ft 4 in)	55 kg (121 lb)	27 January 2000 (aged 22)	(United States) RPI Engineers
30	G	Lisa Jensen	1.65 m (5 ft 5 in)	61 kg (134 lb)	26 February 1997 (aged 24)	(Sweden) IF Malmö
33	G	Emma-Sofie Nordström	1.77 m (5 ft 10 in)	75 kg (165 lb)	5 November 2002 (aged 19)	(Sweden) Linköping HC
50	F	Mia Bau Hansen	1.67 m (5 ft 6 in)	65 kg (143 lb)	22 June 1995 (aged 26)	(Sweden) IF Malmö
63	F	Josefine Jakobsen – C	1.70 m (5 ft 7 in)	72 kg (159 lb)	17 May 1991 (aged 30)	(Sweden) Djurgårdens IF
68	F	Emma Russell	1.68 m (5 ft 6 in)	75 kg (165 lb)	18 August 1995 (aged 26)	(Denmark) Rødovre SIK
72	G	Cassandra Repstock-Romme	1.71 m (5 ft 7 in)	72 kg (159 lb)	26 August 2001 (aged 20)	(Denmark) Hvidovre IK
80	F	Julie Funch Østergaard	1.70 m (5 ft 7 in)	65 kg (143 lb)	6 August 1995 (aged 26)	(Denmark) Hvidovre IK
87	D	Simone Jacquet Thrysøe	1.80 m (5 ft 11 in)	72 kg (159 lb)	23 April 1987 (aged 34)	(Denmark) Aalborg IK
89	D	Malene Frandsen	1.78 m (5 ft 10 in)	68 kg (150 lb)	25 October 1995 (aged 26)	(Sweden) IF Malmö

=== Japan ===
The roster was announced on 8 January 2022.

Head Coach: Yuji Iizuka

No.	Pos.	Name	Height	Weight	Birthdate	Team
1	G	Nana Fujimoto	1.63 m (5 ft 4 in)	55 kg (121 lb)	3 March 1989 (aged 32)	(Sweden) Färjestad BK
2	D	Shiori Koike	1.59 m (5 ft 3 in)	53 kg (117 lb)	21 March 1993 (aged 28)	(Japan) DK Peregrine
3	D	Aoi Shiga	1.65 m (5 ft 5 in)	60 kg (130 lb)	4 July 1999 (aged 22)	(Japan) Toyota Cygnus
4	D	Ayaka Toko	1.61 m (5 ft 3 in)	58 kg (128 lb)	22 August 1994 (aged 27)	(Japan) Seibu Princess Rabbits
6	D	Sena Suzuki	1.67 m (5 ft 6 in)	56 kg (123 lb)	4 August 1991 (aged 30)	(Japan) Seibu Princess Rabbits
7	D	Yukiko Kawashima	1.63 m (5 ft 4 in)	63 kg (139 lb)	16 November 1996 (aged 25)	(Japan) DK Peregrine
8	D	Akane Hosoyamada	1.63 m (5 ft 4 in)	59 kg (130 lb)	9 March 1992 (aged 29)	(Japan) DK Peregrine
10	F	Haruna Yoneyama	1.60 m (5 ft 3 in)	53 kg (117 lb)	7 November 1991 (aged 30)	(Japan) DK Peregrine
11	F	Mei Miura	1.62 m (5 ft 4 in)	63 kg (139 lb)	16 November 1998 (aged 23)	(Japan) Toyota Cygnus
12	F	Chiho Osawa – C	1.62 m (5 ft 4 in)	63 kg (139 lb)	10 February 1992 (aged 29)	(Sweden) Luleå HF
14	F	Haruka Toko	1.67 m (5 ft 6 in)	64 kg (141 lb)	16 March 1997 (aged 24)	(Japan) Seibu Princess Rabbits
15	F	Rui Ukita	1.69 m (5 ft 7 in)	69 kg (152 lb)	6 June 1996 (aged 25)	(Japan) Daishin
16	F	Akane Shiga	1.65 m (5 ft 5 in)	61 kg (134 lb)	3 March 2001 (aged 20)	(Japan) Toyota Cygnus
18	F	Suzuka Taka	1.61 m (5 ft 3 in)	53 kg (117 lb)	16 October 1996 (aged 25)	(Japan) DK Peregrine
19	F	Chika Otaki	1.60 m (5 ft 3 in)	53 kg (117 lb)	14 December 1998 (aged 23)	(Japan) DK Peregrine
20	G	Miyuu Masuhara	1.57 m (5 ft 2 in)	43 kg (95 lb)	4 October 2001 (aged 20)	(Japan) DK Peregrine
21	F	Hanae Kubo	1.68 m (5 ft 6 in)	64 kg (141 lb)	10 December 1982 (aged 39)	(Japan) Seibu Princess Rabbits
22	F	Miho Shishiuchi	1.65 m (5 ft 5 in)	60 kg (130 lb)	21 August 1992 (aged 29)	(Japan) Toyota Cygnus
23	F	Hikaru Yamashita	1.57 m (5 ft 2 in)	54 kg (119 lb)	23 September 2000 (aged 21)	(Japan) Seibu Princess Rabbits
27	F	Remi Koyama	1.46 m (4 ft 9 in)	52 kg (115 lb)	17 July 2000 (aged 21)	(Japan) Seibu Princess Rabbits
28	D	Shiori Yamashita	1.58 m (5 ft 2 in)	50 kg (110 lb)	28 April 2002 (aged 19)	(Japan) Seibu Princess Rabbits
30	G	Akane Konishi	1.66 m (5 ft 5 in)	70 kg (150 lb)	14 August 1995 (aged 26)	(Japan) Seibu Princess Rabbits

=== Sweden ===
The roster was announced on 19 January 2022. Before travelling to Beijing, selected players Emmy Alasalmi, Sara Grahn, Linnea Hedin and Hanna Olsson tested positive for COVID-19 and were replaced by Linnéa Andersson, Paula Bergström, Linn Peterson, and Agnes Åker.

Head Coach: Ulf Lundberg

No.	Pos.	Name	Height	Weight	Birthdate	Team
1	G	Agnes Åker	1.70 m (5 ft 7 in)	61 kg (134 lb)	22 July 1997 (aged 24)	(Sweden) AIK
3	D	Anna Kjellbin	1.70 m (5 ft 7 in)	63 kg (139 lb)	16 March 1994 (aged 27)	(Sweden) Luleå HF/MSSK
4	D	Linnéa Andersson	1.71 m (5 ft 7 in)	61 kg (134 lb)	30 September 1998 (aged 23)	(Sweden) HV71
5	D	Johanna Fällman	1.73 m (5 ft 8 in)	72 kg (159 lb)	21 June 1990 (aged 31)	(Sweden) Luleå HF/MSSK
8	D	Ebba Berglund	1.60 m (5 ft 3 in)	65 kg (143 lb)	13 June 1998 (aged 23)	(Sweden) HV71
9	D	Jessica Adolfsson	1.76 m (5 ft 9 in)	74 kg (163 lb)	15 July 1998 (aged 23)	(Sweden) Linköping HC
10	D	Mina Waxin	1.65 m (5 ft 5 in)	63 kg (139 lb)	29 April 2001 (aged 20)	(Sweden) Brynäs IF
11	F	Josefin Bouveng	1.73 m (5 ft 8 in)	66 kg (146 lb)	15 May 2001 (aged 20)	(Sweden) Brynäs IF
12	D	Maja Nylén Persson	1.62 m (5 ft 4 in)	66 kg (146 lb)	20 November 2000 (aged 21)	(Sweden) Brynäs IF
13	F	Emma Murén	1.66 m (5 ft 5 in)	65 kg (143 lb)	17 January 1998 (aged 24)	(Sweden) Brynäs IF
15	F	Lisa Johansson	1.61 m (5 ft 3 in)	59 kg (130 lb)	11 April 1992 (aged 29)	(Sweden) AIK
16	F	Linnéa Johansson	1.71 m (5 ft 7 in)	65 kg (143 lb)	5 April 2002 (aged 19)	(Sweden) Linköping HC
17	F	Sofie Lundin	1.64 m (5 ft 5 in)	63 kg (139 lb)	15 February 2000 (aged 21)	(Sweden) Djurgårdens IF
19	F	Sara Hjalmarsson	1.76 m (5 ft 9 in)	72 kg (159 lb)	8 February 1998 (aged 23)	(United States) Providence Friars
20	D	Paula Bergström	1.72 m (5 ft 8 in)		26 January 1999 (aged 23)	(Sweden) Modo Hockey
22	F	Linn Peterson	1.74 m (5 ft 9 in)	75 kg (165 lb)	8 January 1994 (aged 28)	(Sweden) Luleå HF/MSSK
24	F	Felizia Wikner-Zienkiewicz	1.65 m (5 ft 5 in)	52 kg (115 lb)	17 September 1999 (aged 22)	(Sweden) HV71
25	F	Lina Ljungblom	1.67 m (5 ft 6 in)	79 kg (174 lb)	15 October 2001 (aged 20)	(Sweden) Modo Hockey
27	F	Emma Nordin	1.68 m (5 ft 6 in)	74 kg (163 lb)	22 March 1991 (aged 30)	(Sweden) Luleå HF/MSSK
28	F	Michelle Löwenhielm	1.72 m (5 ft 8 in)	66 kg (146 lb)	22 March 1995 (aged 26)	(Sweden) SDE Hockey
29	F	Olivia Carlsson	1.74 m (5 ft 9 in)	73 kg (161 lb)	2 March 1995 (aged 26)	(Sweden) Modo Hockey
30	G	Emma Söderberg	1.71 m (5 ft 7 in)	69 kg (152 lb)	18 February 1998 (aged 23)	(United States) Minnesota Duluth Bulldogs
35	G	Ida Boman	1.67 m (5 ft 6 in)	61 kg (134 lb)	1 April 2003 (aged 18)	(Sweden) Djurgårdens IF
