= Melinda Olsson =

Swedish ice hockey player

- Born: 9 September 1992 (age 32); Överkalix, Sweden
- Height: 1.83 m (6 ft 0 in)
- Weight: 85 kg (187 lb; 13 st 5 lb)
- Position: Forward
- Shot: Left
- Played for: Luleå HF/MSSK; Linköping HC; Munksund Skuthamn SK; MODO Hockey
- Current NDHL coach: Luleå HF 2
- National team: Sweden
- Playing career: 2008–2019
- Coaching career: 2020–present

Melinda Olsson (born 9 September 1992) is a Swedish ice hockey coach and former player. She is head coach of Luleå HF 2, which plays in the DamEttan Norra of the Nationella Damhockeyligan (NDHL), and is an assistant coach to the Swedish national under-18 team.

As a member of the Swedish national team, she participated in the 2019 IIHF Women's World Championship.
