= Agnes Åker =

- Born: July 22, 1997 (age 29) Soderhamn, Sweden
- Height: 1.70 cm (0.67 in)
- Weight: 61 kg (134 lb; 9 st 8 lb)
- Position: Goaltender
- Catches: Left
- SDHL team Former teams: AIK; Djurgårdens IF; MODO Hockey
- National team: Sweden
- Playing career: 2013–present

Agnes Åker (born 22 July 1997) is a Swedish ice hockey goaltender. She was a member of the Swedish national team that participated at the 2022 Winter Olympics. She won an SDHL championship in 2017.

== Playing career ==
=== International ===
Before travelling to Beijing for the 2022 Winter Olympics, selected players Emmy Alasalmi, Sara Grahn, Linnea Hedin and Hanna Olsson tested positive for COVID-19 and were replaced by Linnéa Andersson, Paula Bergström, Linn Peterson, and Agnes Åker.
