= Fällman =

Fällman is a Swedish surname. Notable people with the surname include:

- David Fällman (born 1990), Swedish footballer
- Johanna Fällman (born 1990), Swedish ice hockey player
