= Linnea Hedin =

Swedish ice hockey player

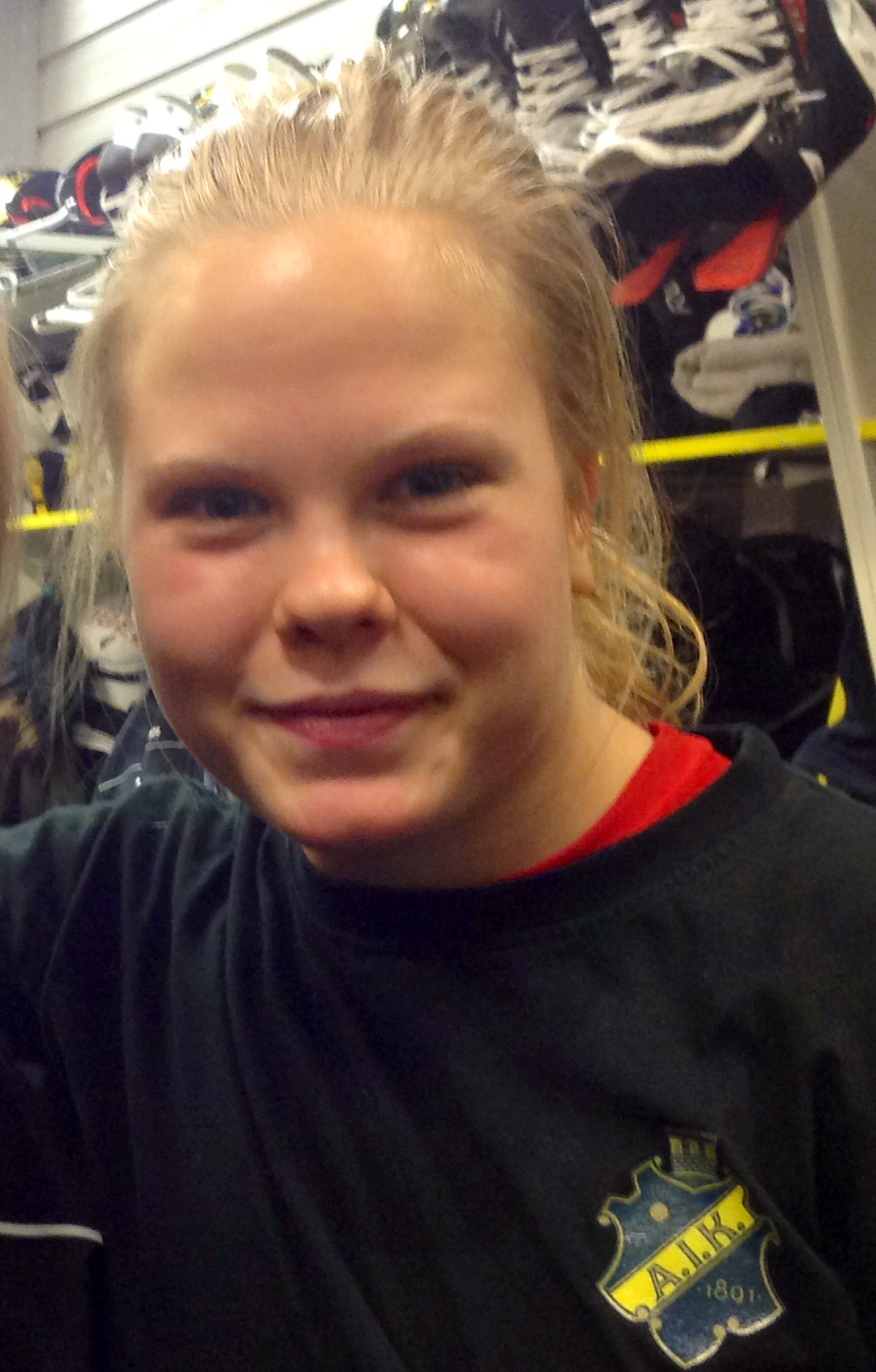
- Hedin with AIK IF in 2013
- Born: 24 January 1995 (age 31) Huddinge, Sweden
- Height: 160 cm (5 ft 3 in)
- Weight: 57 kg (126 lb; 9 st 0 lb)
- Position: Defense
- Shoots: Left
- SDHL team Former teams: SDE Hockey: AIK IF; Minnesota Duluth Bulldogs; Segeltorps IF
- National team: Sweden
- Playing career: 2009–present

Linnea Johanna Hedin (born 24 January 1995) is a Swedish ice hockey player, currently playing in the Swedish Women's Hockey League (SDHL) with SDE Hockey. As a member of the Swedish national team, she participated in the IIHF Women's World Championship in 2012 and 2013.

== Playing career ==
Hedin began playing ice hockey in the youth department Huddinge IK in her hometown of Huddinge, the second most populous municipality in the Stockholm urban area. She made her senior league debut with the women's ice hockey team of Segeltorps IF in the Riksserien (renamed SDHL in 2016) during the 2009–10 season. Segeltorps IF claimed the Riksserien championship title in both 2010 and 2011, capping Hedin’s rookie and second seasons with Swedish Championship gold.

After three seasons with Segeltorps IF, she transferred to AIK Hockey ahead of the 2012–13 Riksserien season. With AIK IF, she won a silver medal in the 2013–14 IIHF European Women's Champions Cup.

Hedin’s college ice hockey career began when she joined the Minnesota Duluth Bulldogs women's ice hockey program in the Western Collegiate Hockey Association (WCHA) conference of the NCAA Division I ahead of the 2014–15 season. She played four seasons with the team and served as an alternate captain during the 2017–18 season.

Returning to Sweden after her collegiate career, Hedin re-joined AIK IF in the 2018–19 SDHL season. She was one of AIK’s alternate captains during the 2020–21 season, part of the leadership group headed by captain Sabina Küller and filled out by fellow alternates Emmy Alasalmi, Erica Udén Johansson, and Line Bialik Øien.

In the 2022–23 season, she joined Färjestad BK in the Nationella Damhockeyligan (NDHL) as the team made a push to qualify for the SDHL. After the team ultimately fell short of their SDHL aspirations in 2023, Hedin returned to the SDHL for the 2023–24 season, signing with SDE HF and taking on the alternate captaincy.

== International play ==
As a junior player with the Swedish national under-18 ice hockey team, Hedin participated in four IIHF U18 Women's World Championships and won bronze medals at the tournaments in 2010, 2012, and 2013. She was selected as a top-three player for Sweden by the coaches in 2012. Hedin served as an alternate captain at the 2013 tournament, where she was Sweden’s highest scoring defenseman and was named one of the team’s top-three players for the second time.

Her senior national team debut was the 2012 IIHF Women's World Championship in Burlington, Vermont and she also competed in the 2013 IIHF Women's World Championship in Ottawa; she did not record any points at either event.

Hedin intermittently played with the national team over subsequent seasons but was not selected for another major tournament until being named to the roster participating in the Olympic qualification tournament for the 2022 Winter Olympics. She contributed a goal and two assists across three games in an effort that culminated in Sweden securing an Olympic berth.

She was officially named to the Swedish Olympic roster on 19 January 2022 and was set to participate in the women's ice hockey tournament at the 2022 Winter Olympics. However, she and teammate Emmy Alasalmi tested positive for COVID-19 shortly before they were scheduled to depart for Beijing and were not permitted to travel with the team; their roster slots were filled by Linnéa Andersson and Paula Bergström.

== Personal life ==
Hedin was born on 24 January 1995 to Johanna Antiainen and Lars Hedin. She is the youngest of three children and her older brother, Viktor, played ice hockey until his late teens.

She graduated from the University of Minnesota Duluth in 2018 with a bachelor’s degree in finance.
