= Sidney Morin =

American ice hockey player

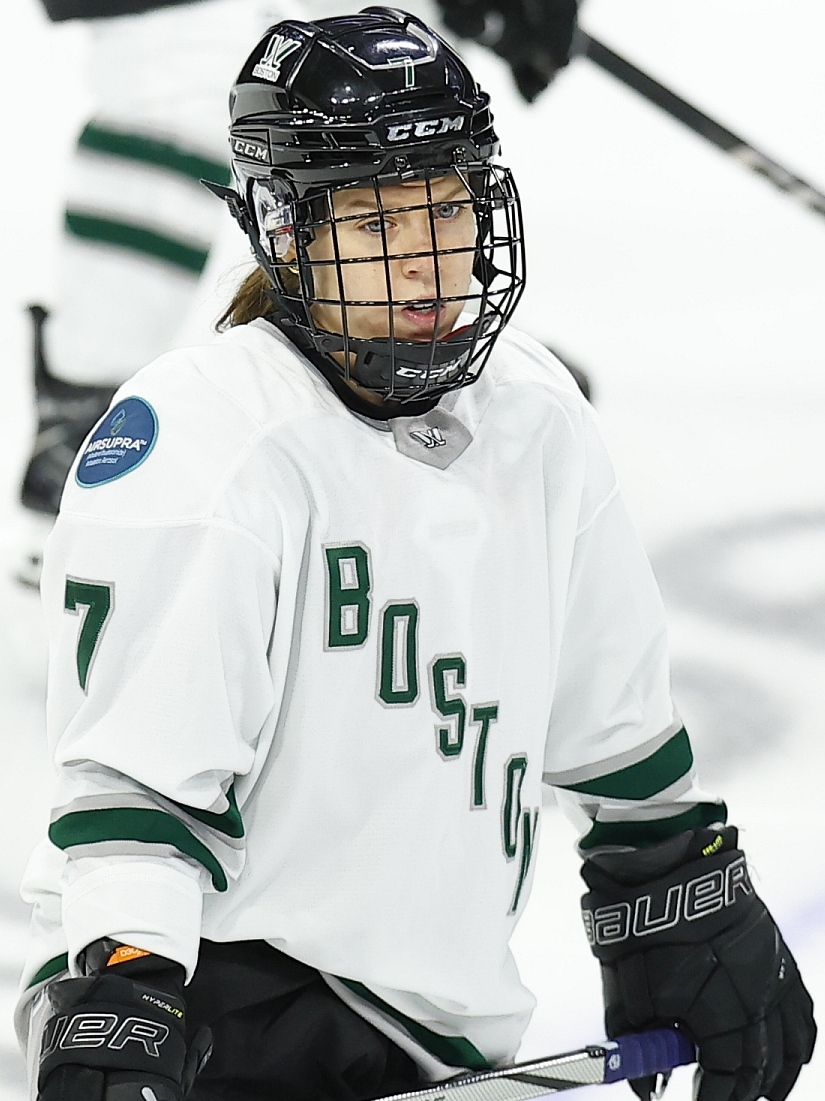
- Morin with PWHL Boston in 2024
- Born: June 6, 1995 (age 31) Minnetonka, Minnesota, US
- Height: 5 ft 5 in (165 cm)
- Weight: 128 lb (58 kg; 9 st 2 lb)
- Position: Defense
- Shoots: Right
- PWHL team Former teams: Minnesota Frost: Boston Fleet; Minnesota Whitecaps; HC Ladies Lugano; HV71; Linköping HC; Modo Hockey
- National team: United States
- Playing career: 2013–present
Medal record
Olympic Games
Gold medal – first place	2018 Pyeongchang	Ice hockey
World U18 Championship
Silver medal – second place	2013 Finland

Sidney Emilie Morin (born June 6, 1995) is a Canadian-American professional ice hockey player who is a defender for the Minnesota Frost of the Professional Women's Hockey League (PWHL). As a member of the United States women's national team, she won a gold medal in the women's ice hockey tournament at the 2018 Winter Olympics in Pyeongchang.

== Playing career ==
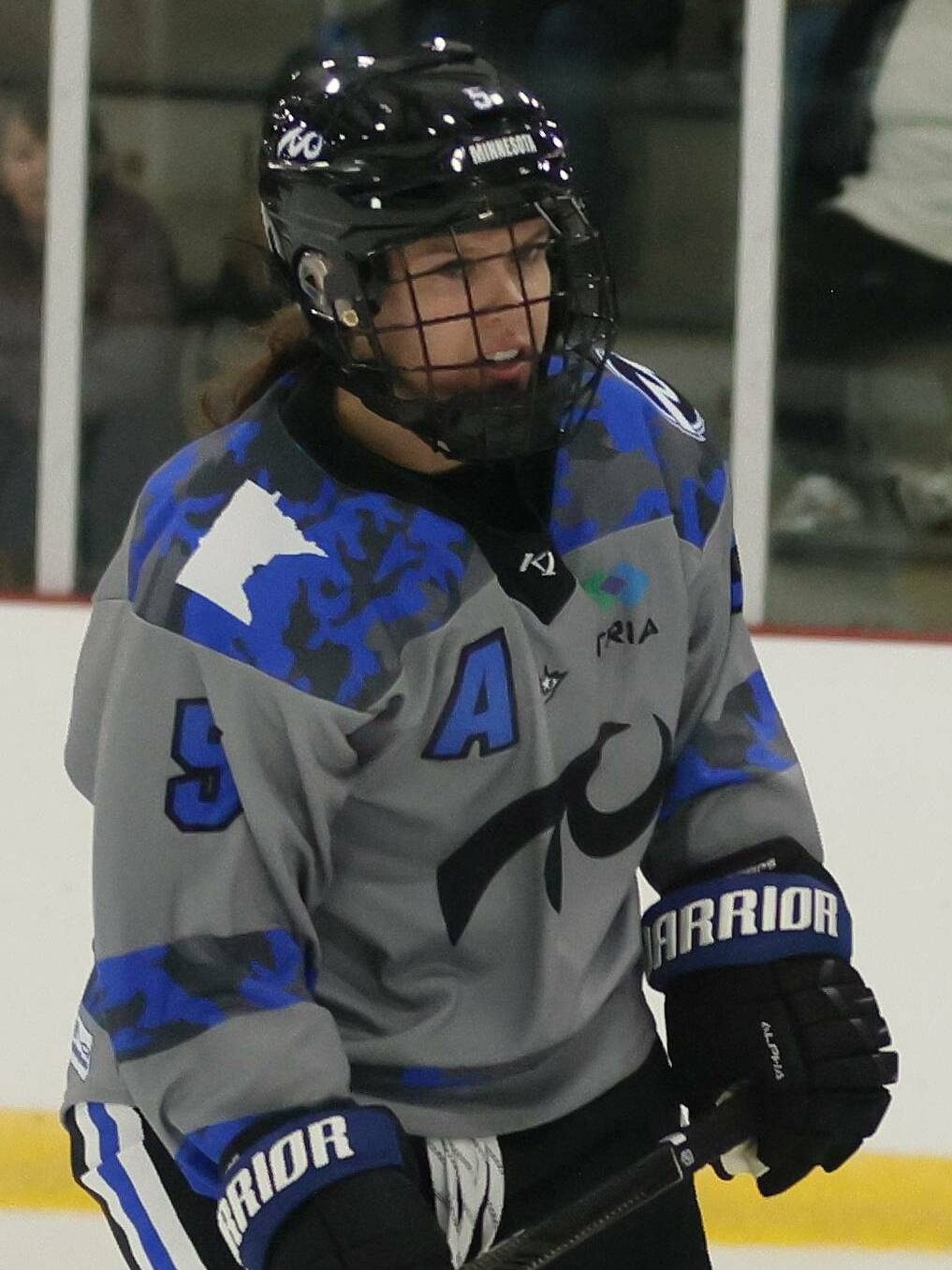
Morin with the Minnesota Whitecaps in 2022

Morin is a former captain of the Minnesota Duluth Bulldogs women's ice hockey program. As a Bulldog, Morin was named WCHA Women's Defensive Player of the Year in 2017.

After graduating, she signed her first professional contract with Modo Hockey for the 2017–18 SDHL season. The following season, she signed with Linköping HC. She was named SDHL Defender of the Year in 2020.

After three seasons playing in Europe, Morin returned to Minnesota to join the Minnesota Whitecaps of the Premier Hockey Federation (PHF) for the 2022–23 season. She was drafted in the ninth round of the 2023 PWHL Draft by PWHL Minnesota, but was released and signed by PWHL Boston prior to the 2024 season. On June 20, 2024, she signed a one-year contract extension with Boston. During the 2024–25 season, she recorded three goals and five assists in 30 games. On June 20, 2025, she signed a two-year contract with the Minnesota Frost.

== International play ==
She won gold at the 2018 Winter Olympics with Team USA, picking up two assists in five games.

== Career statistics ==
=== Regular season and playoffs ===
			Regular season					Playoffs
Season	Team	League	GP	G	A	Pts	PIM	GP	G	A	Pts	PIM
2013–14	Minnesota Duluth	WCHA	36	5	10	15	12	—	—	—	—	—
2014–15	Minnesota Duluth	WCHA	37	2	13	15	4	—	—	—	—	—
2015–16	Minnesota Duluth	WCHA	37	4	12	16	6	—	—	—	—	—
2016–17	Minnesota Duluth	WCHA	37	8	16	24	14	—	—	—	—	—
2017–18	Modo Hockey	SDHL	21	10	22	32	10	5	2	2	4	0
2018–19	Linköping HC	SDHL	32	17	21	38	12	9	4	7	11	0
2019–20	HV71	SDHL	36	15	34	49	8	6	3	5	8	0
2020–21	HV71	SDHL	36	18	47	65	6	5	0	8	8	0
2021–22	HC Ladies Lugano	SWHL A	25	20	38	58	2	5	5	3	8	6
2022–23	Minnesota Whitecaps	PHF	24	7	10	17	4	3	1	1	2	0
2023–24	PWHL Boston	PWHL	24	1	3	4	2	8	0	2	2	0
2024–25	Boston Fleet	PWHL	30	3	5	8	10	—	—	—	—	—
SDHL totals			89	42	77	119	30	20	9	14	23	0
SWHL totals			25	20	38	58	2	5	5	3	8	6
PHF totals			24	7	10	17	4	3	1	1	2	0
PWHL totals			54	4	8	12	12	8	0	2	2	0

=== International ===
Year	Team	Event	Result	GP	G	A	Pts	PIM
2013	United States	U18	2nd place, silver medalist(s)	5	1	0	1	2
2018	United States	OG	1st place, gold medalist(s)	5	0	2	2	2
Junior totals				5	1	0	1	2
Senior totals				5	0	2	2	2

== Personal life ==
Morin is a member of the LGBTQ community. She got engaged to her girlfriend Ronja Mogren in 2024.
