= Shay Maloney =

American ice hockey player (born 2000)

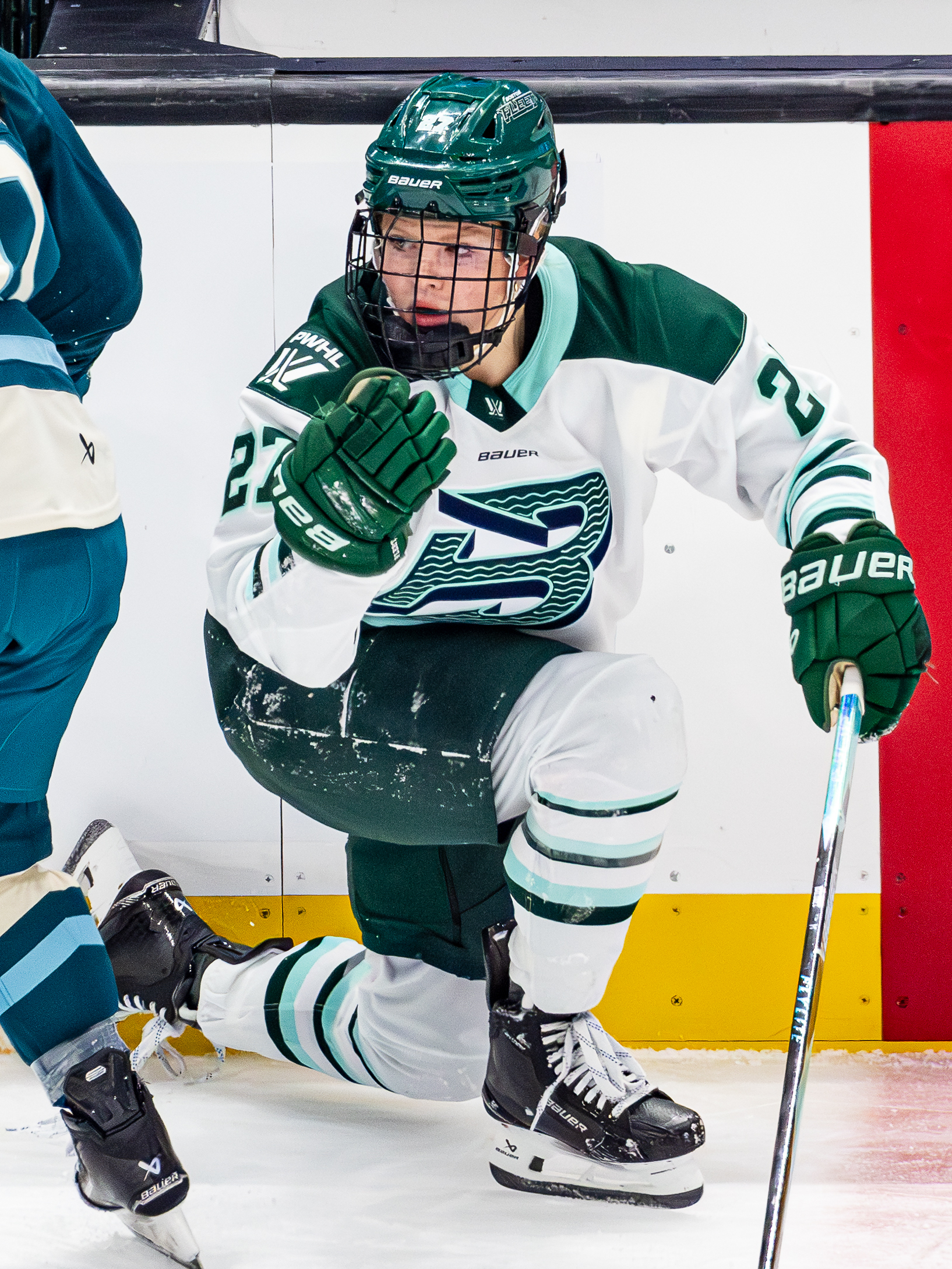
- Maloney with the Boston Fleet in 2026
- Born: January 13, 2000 (age 26) McHenry, Illinois, U.S.
- Height: 5 ft 9 in (175 cm)
- Position: Forward
- Shoots: Right
- PWHL team Former teams: Boston Fleet; Leksands IF
- Playing career: 2023–present

Shay Maloney (born January 13, 2000) is an American professional ice hockey forward for the Boston Fleet of the Professional Women's Hockey League (PWHL). She played college ice hockey at Brown and Quinnipiac and for Leksands IF in the Swedish Women's Hockey League (SDHL).

== Playing career ==
=== College ===
Maloney played at Brown University from 2018 to 2022 and served as captain for the 2021–22 season. The 2020–21 season was canceled due to COVID-19. She was named the team's most valuable player in all three of her seasons. Her senior year, she scored a then-career-high of 19 points and earned an Honorable Mention All-Ivy.

She played her final year of eligibility at Quinnipiac, where she scored a career-high 15 goals and 31 points in forty games, second on the team. Quinnipiac awarded her the Most Valuable Player award.

=== Professional ===
After college, Maloney played for Leksands IF in the Swedish Women's Hockey League. She scored twenty points in thirty-six games for the Swedish club in her first season. Playing in Sweden, Maloney experienced checking as an adult for the first time and improved her physical game.

Maloney was selected in the sixth round, 34th overall, by the Boston Fleet in the 2024 PWHL Draft. She was the first Brown alumni to be drafted into the PWHL. During the 2024–25 season, she recorded three goals and six assists in 30 games. On July 14, 2025, she signed a two-year contract extension with the Fleet.

== Personal life ==
Maloney played in youth boys hockey leagues from ages 4 to 14. Her older brother Michael also played hockey and competed for the Brown men's hockey team while Maloney was on the women's team.

== Career statistics ==
			Regular season					Playoffs
Season	Team	League	GP	G	A	Pts	PIM	GP	G	A	Pts	PIM
2018–19	Brown University	ECAC	28	7	11	18	18	—	—	—	—	—
2019–20	Brown University	ECAC	29	6	6	12	10	—	—	—	—	—
2021–22	Brown University	ECAC	29	11	8	19	6	—	—	—	—	—
2022–23	Quinnipiac University	ECAC	34	5	16	21	12	—	—	—	—	—
2023–24	Leksands IF	SDHL	36	9	11	20	14	3	0	0	0	0
2024–25	Leksands IF	SDHL	14	1	0	1	10	—	—	—	—	—
2024–25	Boston Fleet	PWHL	30	3	6	9	8	—	—	—	—	—
2025–26	Boston Fleet	PWHL	30	3	4	7	10	4	1	1	2	0
SDHL totals			50	10	11	21	24	3	0	0	0	0
PWHL totals			60	6	10	16	18	4	1	1	2	0
