= Anna Borgqvist =

Swedish ice hockey player and coach

- Born: 11 June 1992 (age 34) Växjö, Sweden
- Height: 1.64 m (5 ft 5 in)
- Weight: 64 kg (141 lb; 10 st 1 lb)
- Position: Forward
- Shot: Left
- Played for: HV71; Brynäs IF; Leksands IF; Växjö Lakers
- Current NDHL coach: Leksands IF 2
- Coached for: AIK Hockey 2
- National team: Sweden
- Playing career: 2004–2021
- Coaching career: 2021–present

Anna Borgqvist (born 11 June 1992) is a Swedish retired ice hockey forward and the current head coach of Leksands IF 2 in the Nationella Damhockeyligan (NDHL). As a member of the Swedish national ice hockey team, she participated in five IIHF Women's World Championships and two Winter Olympic Games.

== Playing career ==
Her club career was played across fourteen seasons in the Swedish Women's Hockey League (SDHL; called Riksserien until 2016) with the Växjö Lakers, Leksands IF, Brynäs IF, and HV71. As of the conclusion of the 2022–23 SDHL season, she holds second-place on the SDHL career penalty minutes record table, with 409 PIM, and ninth place on the all-time points table, with 338 points (141+197) in 371 games.

== International career ==
As a junior player with the Swedish national under-18 team, she participated in the IIHF U18 Women's World Championships in 2008 and 2009, including winning a bronze medal at the 2009 tournament.

Borgqvist was selected for the Swedish delegation at the 2014 Winter Olympics in Sochi. She played in all six games of the women's ice hockey tournament, scoring two goals and adding two assists.

Borgqvist also represented Sweden at five IIHF Women's World Championship tournaments, first in 2011. She was Sweden’s leading scorer and the third-highest scorer overall at the 2015 tournament, notching five goals and three assists for eight points in four games.

The last major tournament of her playing career was the women's ice hockey tournament at the 2018 Winter Olympics in PyeongChang. She served as one of Sweden’s alternate captains and contributed a goal and two assists in six games.

== Career statistics ==
=== Club statistics ===
Note: Riksserien changed its name to the SDHL in 2016.

			Regular season					Playoffs
Season	Team	League	GP	G	A	Pts	PIM	GP	G	A	Pts	PIM
2007–08	Växjö Lakers	Riksserien	14	9	5	14	18	5	2	3	5	47
2008–09	Leksands IF	Riksserien	20	11	6	17	26	5	6	2	8	0
2009–10	Leksands IF	Riksserien	22	14	22	36	28	3	1	2	3	2
2010–11	Leksands IF	Riksserien	19	6	10	16	20	1	0	0	0	2
2011–12	Brynäs IF	Riksserien	22	12	11	23	12	3	1	0	1	4
2012–13	Brynäs IF	Riksserien	19	11	10	21	12	7	0	1	1	2
2013–14	Brynäs IF	Riksserien	28	19	22	41	67	2	0	0	0	2
2014–15	Brynäs IF	Riksserien	28	13	17	30	36	3	2	2	4	2
2015–16	Brynäs IF	Riksserien	21	8	6	14	10	2	1	0	1	2
2016–17	Brynäs IF	SDHL	35	14	22	36	42	2	0	0	0	2
2017–18	Brynäs IF	SDHL	35	8	15	23	46	2	0	0	0	2
2018–19	Brynäs IF	SDHL	36	7	25	32	28	4	0	3	3	2
2019–20	HV71	SDHL	36	6	17	23	36	6	2	0	2	4
2020–21	HV71	SDHL	36	3	9	12	28	5	2	0	2	29
SDHL totals			371	141	197	338	409	50	17	13	30	102

=== International ===
Year	Team	Event	Result	GP	G	A	Pts	PIM
2008	Sweden U18	WW18	4th	5	2	2	4	8
2009	Sweden U18	WW18	3rd place, bronze medalist(s)	4	3	1	4	2
2011	Sweden	WW	5th	5	1	0	1	0
2013	Sweden	WW	7th	5	0	3	3	0
2014	Sweden	OG	4th	6	2	2	4	2
2015	Sweden	WW	5th	4	5	3	8	2
2016	Sweden	WW	5th	5	2	1	3	2
2017	Sweden	WW	6th	5	0	0	0	2
2018	Sweden	OG	7th	6	1	2	3	6
Junior totals				9	5	3	8	10
Senior totals				36	11	11	22	14
