= Leksands IF (women) =

NDHL ice hockey team in Leksand, Sweden

- City: Leksand, Sweden
- League: NDHL
- Founded: 1998
- Home arena: Tegera Arena
- Colours: Blue, white, yellow
- General manager: Göran Tärnlund
- Head coach: Göran Tärnlund
- Parent club: Leksands IF
- Website: leksandsif.se

Leksands Idrottsförening, abbreviated Leksands IF or LIF, is an ice hockey team in the Swedish Nationella Damhockeyligan (NDHL). They play at Tegera Arena in Leksand, a town in the western-central Swedish province of Dalarna. The team formerly played in the top-tier national league, the Swedish Women's Hockey League (SDHL; called Riksserien until 2016), during 2008 to 2025.

Until 2021, the organisation ran a second women's side, called Leksands IF Dam 2, which competed in the Damettan Västra.

== History ==
The women's section of Leksands IF was founded in 1998. The 2008 season saw a leap in success for the club, as it earned promotion to the Riksserien, and saw Cecilia Östberg and Klara Myrén become the first two Leksands players to represent the Swedish national women's team. In 2012, the club finished in 7th place, and was forced to compete in the relegation playoffs, but managed to keep its place in the SDHL.

In 2016, the club hired former Leksands men's youth player Alexander Bröms as head coach for the women's side, despite him having no previous coaching experience. He would hold the role until his departure in 2018 to coach the women's national under-18 team.

In 2017, multiple Leksands players publicly voiced dissatisfaction at the way the organisation was treating the women's side, including the fact that women's players received no salary and were being forced to clean up the arena's stands after men's games. Despite club chairperson Åke Nordström promising to improve conditions, after six months the players had only been provided with some exercise gear and a team-branded training bag.

In April 2018, Leksands goaltender Leon Reuterström publicly came out as transgender, and retired from the SDHL to pursue his medical transition. Later that summer, long-time club forward and third-leading scorer in club history, Iveta Koka, left the club to sign with AIK IF. Despite losing Koka, the club made several big signings ahead of the 2018–19 season, including Swedish international Anna Borgqvist and Canadian Danielle Stone. After beginning the season with a 9–0 victory over SDE Hockey, Leksands finished in 4th place in the SDHL, the second best result in club history. The club still failed to make it past the playoff quarterfinals, however, and both Borgqvist and Stone left the club after just one year. Long time defender and second-highest all-time in games played for the club Sofia Engström left the Leksands that summer as well, after the club had gone months without offering any players (nor the head coach) a contract extension following the team's elimination in the playoffs. The club dropped to 8th place in the 2019–20 SDHL season.

== Season-by-season results ==
This is a partial list of the most recent seasons completed by Leksands. Code explanation; GP—Games played, W—Wins, L—Losses, T—Tied games, GF—Goals for, GA—Goals against, Pts—Points. Top Scorer: Points (Goals+Assists)

| Season | League | Regular season | | | | | | | | | | Post season results |
| Season | League | Finish | GP | W | OTW | OTL | L | GF | GA | Pts | Top scorer | Post season results |
|---|---|---|---|---|---|---|---|---|---|---|---|---|
| 2015-16 | Riksserien | 5th | 36 | 18 | 3 | 4 | 11 | 115 | 80 | 64 | (Latvia) I. Koka 40 (10+30) | Lost quarterfinals against Djurgården |
| 2016-17 | SDHL | 7th | 36 | 11 | 8 | 1 | 16 | 92 | 103 | 50 | (Latvia) I. Koka 38 (21+17) | Lost quarterfinals against Djurgården |
| 2017-18 | SDHL | 6th | 36 | 13 | 1 | 4 | 18 | 88 | 100 | 45 | (Sweden) W. Johansson 28 (12+16) | Lost quarterfinals against MODO |
| 2018-19 | SDHL | 4th | 36 | 21 | 1 | 0 | 14 | 111 | 74 | 65 | (Sweden) A. Borgqvist 32 (7+25) | Lost quarterfinals against HV71 |
| 2019-20 | SDHL | 8th | 36 | 10 | 3 | 3 | 20 | 91 | 133 | 39 | (Sweden) K. Armborg 30 (9+21) | Lost quarterfinals against HV71 |
| 2020-21 | SDHL | 9th | 36 | 5 | 2 | 1 | 28 | 52 | 148 | 20 | (Sweden) W. Johansson 16 (5+11) | Relegation series cancelled due to COVID-19 pandemic |
| 2021-22 | SDHL | 8th | 36 | 12 | 1 | 1 | 22 | 70 | 104 | 39 | (Czech Republic) T. Vanišová 24 (15+9) | Lost quarterfinals against Brynäs |
| 2022-23 | SDHL | 6th | 32 | 9 | 2 | 6 | 15 | 60 | 89 | 37 | (Czech Republic) H. Haasová 14 (12+2) | Lost quarterfinals against Djurgården |
| 2023-24 | SDHL | 8th | 36 | 11 | 0 | 7 | 18 | 76 | 95 | 40 | (United States) S. Maloney 20 (9+11) | Lost quarterfinals against Luleå |

== Players and personnel ==
=== 2024–25 roster ===
As of 12 January 2025

| No. | Nat | Player | Pos | S/G | Age | Acquired | Birthplace |
|---|---|---|---|---|---|---|---|
| 16 | (Sweden) | Matilda af Bjur (A) | C | L | 27 | 2022 | Linköping, Östergötland, Sweden |
| 7 | (Iceland) | Sunna Björgvinsdóttir | RW | L | 26 | 2024 | Akureyri, Norðurland eystra, Iceland |
| 25 | (Sweden) | Nathalie Carlsson Mattila | D | R | 25 | 2023 | Gothenburg, Västergötland, Sweden |
| 19 | (Canada) | Lillian George | RW | R | 25 | 2024 | Nipissing, Ontario, Canada |
| 28 | (Sweden) | Linnea Horn | F | L | 21 | 2024 | Stockholm, Uppland, Sweden |
| 21 | (Norway) | Emile Kruse Johansen (A) | LW | L | 27 | 2023 | Halden, Østlandet, Norway |
| 87 | (Sweden) | Ellen Jonsson | G | L | 28 | 2023 | Söderhamn, Hälsingland, Sweden |
| 13 | (Sweden) | Ella Lindmark | F | R | 22 | 2024 | Boden, Norrbotten, Sweden |
| 5 | (Sweden) | Hilda Ljungberg | D/C | L | 21 | 2024 | Västerås, Västmanland, Sweden |
| 8 | (Sweden) | Karolin Malmquist | C | L | 26 | 2024 | Kil, Värmland, Sweden |
| 27 | (United States) | Shay Maloney | F | R | 27 | 2023 | McHenry, Illinois, United States |
| 26 | (Sweden) | Vilma Nilsson | C | L | 24 | 2024 | Umeå, Västerbotten, Sweden |
| 35 | (United States) | Emma Polusny | G | L | 27 | 2022 | Mound, Minnesota, United States |
| 15 | (Sweden) | Ida Press | D | L | 27 | 2023 | Uppsala, Uppland, Sweden |
| 77 | (Czech Republic) | Tereza Radová | D | L | 24 | 2022 | Svitavy, Pardubický kraj, Czechia |
| 22 | (Czech Republic) | Agáta Sarnovská | LW | L | 25 | 2023 | Litoměřice, Ústecký kraj, Czechia |
| 12 | (Sweden) | Sofia Sohlin | RW | L | 22 | 2024 | |
| 24 | (Sweden) | Wilma Tagesson | D | L | 18 | 2024 | Örebro, Närke, Sweden |
| 18 | (Sweden) | Saga Tynell Nissas | C | L | 27 | 2023 | |
| 23 | (Sweden) | Alva Ullbors | D | L | 20 | 2022 | Mora, Dalarna, Sweden |
| 29 | (Canada) | Courtney Vorster (C) | D | R | 26 | 2023 | Richmond, British Columbia, Canada |
| 10 | (Finland) | Kiira Yrjänen | F | L | 24 | 2024 | Riihimäki, Kanta-Häme, Finland |
| 44 | (Sweden) | Wilda Öhman | D | L | 22 | 2024 | Luleå, Norrbotten, Sweden |

Coaching staff and team personnel

- Head coach: Joakim Engström
- Assistant coach: Göran Tärnlund
- Goaltending coach: Filip Myrskog
- Conditioning coach: Karin Reichel
- Equipment managers: Kent Arvidsson

=== Team captaincy history ===
- Sofia Engström, 2008–2014
- Elin Lundberg, 2014–2019
- Hanna Sköld, 2019–2022
- Abby Thiessen, 2022–23
- Anna Purschke, 2023–24
- Courtney Vorster, 2024–

=== Head coaches ===
- Daniel Ljung, 2007–08
- Ulf Hedberg, 2008–2011
- Magnus Svensson, 2011–12
- Christer Siik, 2012–2014
- Jens Nielsen, 2014–15
- Christer Sjöberg, 2015–16
- Alexander Bröms, 2016–2018
- Ulf Hedberg, 2018–19
- Lars Stanmark, 2019–2021
- Mathias Olsson, 2021–22
- Jordan Colliton, 5 May 2022 – 22 November 2023
- Joakim Engström, 22 November 2023 –

== Franchise records and leaders ==
=== All-time scoring leaders ===
The top-ten regular season point-scorers (goals + assists) of Leksands IF through the 2023–24 season.

Note: Nat = Nationality; Pos = Position; GP = Games played; G = Goals; A = Assists; Pts = Points; P/G = Points per game; = 2024–25 Leksands player

All-Time Points
| Nat | Player | Pos | GP | G | A | Pts | P/G |
|---|---|---|---|---|---|---|---|
| (Sweden) | Cecilia Östberg | LW | 152 | 86 | 117 | 203 | 1.34 |
| (Sweden) | Hanna Lindqvist | LW/C | 317 | 80 | 102 | 182 | 0.57 |
| (Latvia) | Iveta Koka | LW | 176 | 81 | 98 | 179 | 1.02 |
| (Sweden) | Wilma Johansson | C/RW | 278 | 63 | 83 | 146 | 0.53 |
| (Sweden) | Sofia Engström | D | 330 | 43 | 86 | 129 | 0.39 |
| (Sweden) | Hanna Sköld | F | 238 | 65 | 59 | 124 | 0.52 |
| (Sweden) | Madeleine Hall | C | 206 | 51 | 59 | 110 | 0.53 |
| (Sweden) | Lina Wester | C | 153 | 57 | 47 | 104 | 0.68 |
| (Sweden) | Anna Borgqvist | C/LW | 97 | 38 | 63 | 101 | 1.04 |
| (Sweden) | Kajsa Armborg | C | 208 | 33 | 55 | 88 | 0.42 |
