= Johanna Fällman =

Swedish ice hockey player (born 1990)

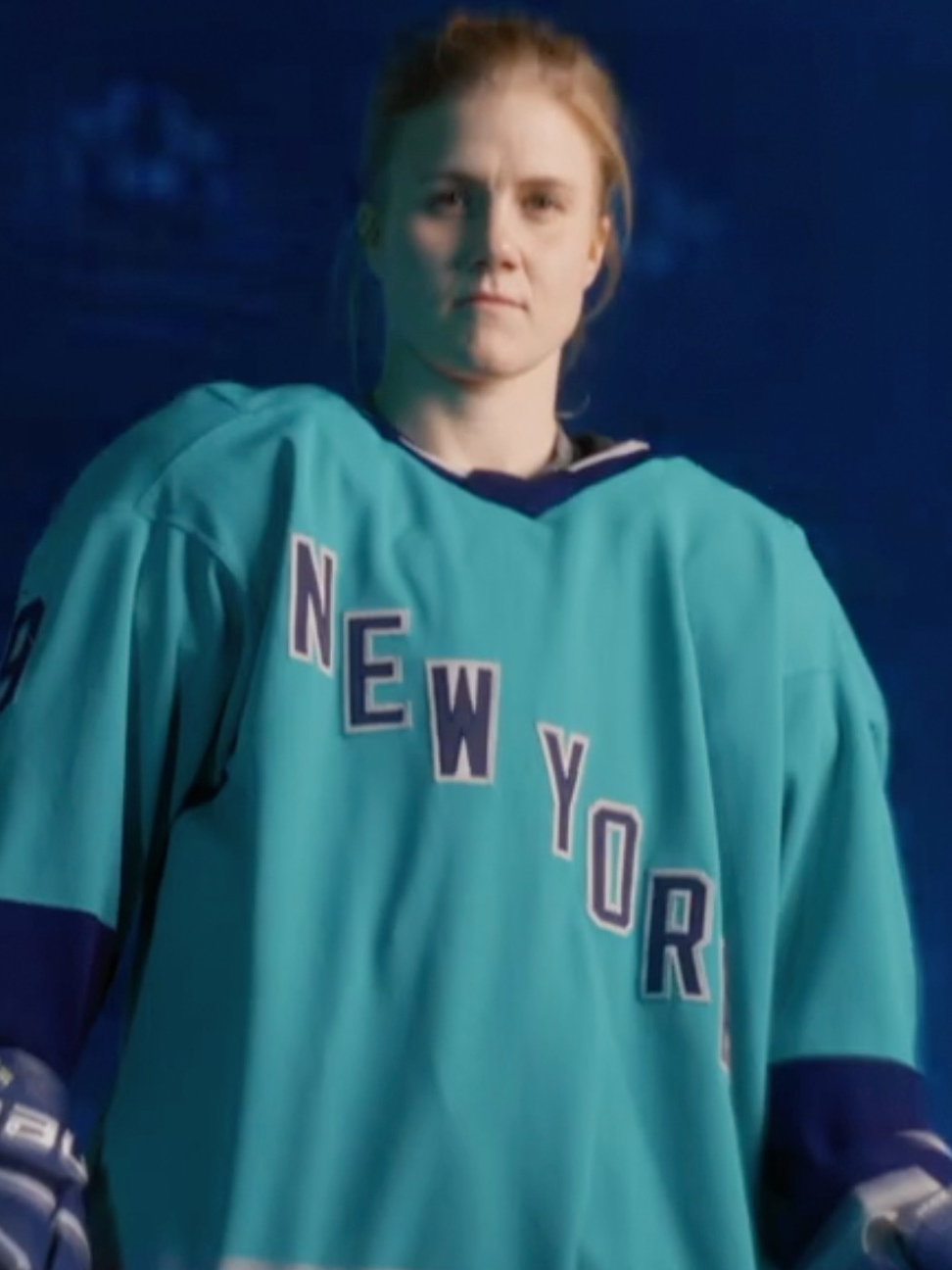
- Fällman with PWHL New York in 2024
- Born: 21 June 1990 (age 36) Luleå, Sweden
- Height: 1.73 m (5 ft 8 in)
- Weight: 72 kg (159 lb; 11 st 5 lb)
- Position: Defence
- Shoots: Left
- SDHL team Former teams: Luleå HF/MSSK; PWHL New York; Modo Hockey; Skellefteå AIK
- National team: Sweden
- Playing career: 2007–present

Johanna Fällman (born 21 June 1990) is a Swedish ice hockey defender for Luleå HF/MSSK of the Swedish Women's Hockey League (SDHL) and the Swedish national team. She has won four SDHL championships and has appeared in nine senior international tournaments.

== Playing career ==
Growing up in Luleå, in northern Sweden, Fällman often played on boys' teams in her youth. She has spoken out openly about having faced misogynistic abuse from boys she played with in the league.

She began her Riksserien career with Skellefteå AIK, scoring 2 points in 12 games in the league's debut season. From 2008 to 2012, she played for Modo Hockey, winning the Riksserien championship in the 2011–12 season.

Ahead of the 2012–13 season, she turned down an offer from Munksund-Skuthamns SK to move to North America, joining the University of North Dakota. Across three years in the NCAA, she scored 8 points in 66 games.

In 2015, she returned to Sweden to sign with Luleå HF/MSSK in her hometown, being named an assistant captain for the club ahead of the 2015–16 season. She scored 16 points in 33 games that year, as Luleå won the SDHL championship for the first time.

In January 2019, she picked up a Gordie Howe hat-trick in a 14–0 victory over Göteborg HC, a rare event in women's hockey, after getting into a fight with Anna Borgfeldt.

Fällman was named to the inaugural roster of PWHL New York of the Professional Women's Hockey League (PWHL) as an undrafted training camp invitee.

== International play ==
Fällman made her senior Swedish national team debut in 2008, at the age of 18.

She made her IIHF World Championship debut at the 2011 IIHF Women's World Championship, not scoring a point in the five games she played. She has since participated at every World Championship for Sweden, including the 2017 IIHF Women's World Championship, where she scored four goals, and the 2019 IIHF Women's World Championship when Sweden was relegated for the first time in the country's history.

She played for Sweden at the 2018 Winter Olympics, scoring one goal in six games as the country finished in seventh.

She welcomed the unionization of the Swedish national team in 2018, stating that "we will be able to create better conditions both on and off the ice." She was among the players who participated in the 2019 Sweden women's national ice hockey team strike.

== Style of play ==
Fällman is known for playing a rougher, more physical style and her defensive positioning.

== Personal life ==
Fällman has been in a relationship since December 2020.

== Career statistics ==
=== Regular season and playoffs ===
			Regular season					Playoffs
Season	Team	League	GP	G	A	Pts	PIM	GP	G	A	Pts	PIM
2006–07	Skellefteå AIK	Division 1	—	—	—	—	—	2	0	2	2	2
2007–08	Skellefteå AIK	Riksserien	12	0	2	2	10	4	0	1	1	27
2008–09	MoDo Hockey	Riksserien	16	0	3	3	37	7	2	1	3	8
2009–10	MoDo Hockey	Riksserien	24	1	9	10	30	5	4	0	4	8
2010–11	MoDo Hockey	Riksserien	26	7	7	14	45	2	0	0	0	0
2011–12	MoDo Hockey	Riksserien	27	2	3	5	12	3	0	1	1	0
2013–14	University of North Dakota	WCHA	29	1	4	5	12	—	—	—	—	—
2014–15	University of North Dakota	WCHA	37	0	3	3	9	—	—	—	—	—
2015–16	Luleå HF	Riksserien	33	2	4	16	20	7	0	0	0	4
2016–17	Luleå HF	SDHL	35	9	9	18	10	4	0	1	1	0
2017–18	Luleå HF	SDHL	25	0	11	11	22	7	2	0	2	4
2018–19	Luleå HF	SDHL	24	4	5	9	37	11	0	3	3	4
2019–20	Luleå HF	SDHL	34	4	9	13	24	6	1	0	1	0
2020–21	Luleå HF	SDHL	34	4	6	10	26	9	0	1	1	6
2021–22	Luleå HF	SDHL	34	2	7	9	30	12	0	2	2	6
2022–23	Luleå HF	SDHL	15	1	1	2	4	8	0	1	1	0
2023–24	New York	PWHL	21	0	0	0	2	—	—	—	—	—
SDHL totals			339	36	86	122	307	85	9	11	20	67
PWHL totals			21	0	0	0	2	—	—	—	—	—

=== International ===
Year	Team	Event	Result	GP	G	A	Pts	PIM
2008	Sweden	U18	4th	5	1	0	1	6
2011	Sweden	WC	5th	5	0	0	0	2
2012	Sweden	WC	5th	4	0	1	1	0
2013	Sweden	WC	7th	5	0	0	0	6
2015	Sweden	WC	5th	4	0	1	1	0
2016	Sweden	WC	5th	5	0	0	0	6
2017	Sweden	WC	6th	5	4	0	4	2
2018	Sweden	OG	7th	6	1	0	1	10
2019	Sweden	WC	9th	5	0	0	0	2
2022	Sweden	OG	8th	5	0	0	0	6
Junior totals				5	1	0	1	6
Senior totals				44	5	2	7	34
