= Denise Altmann =

Austrian ice hockey forward

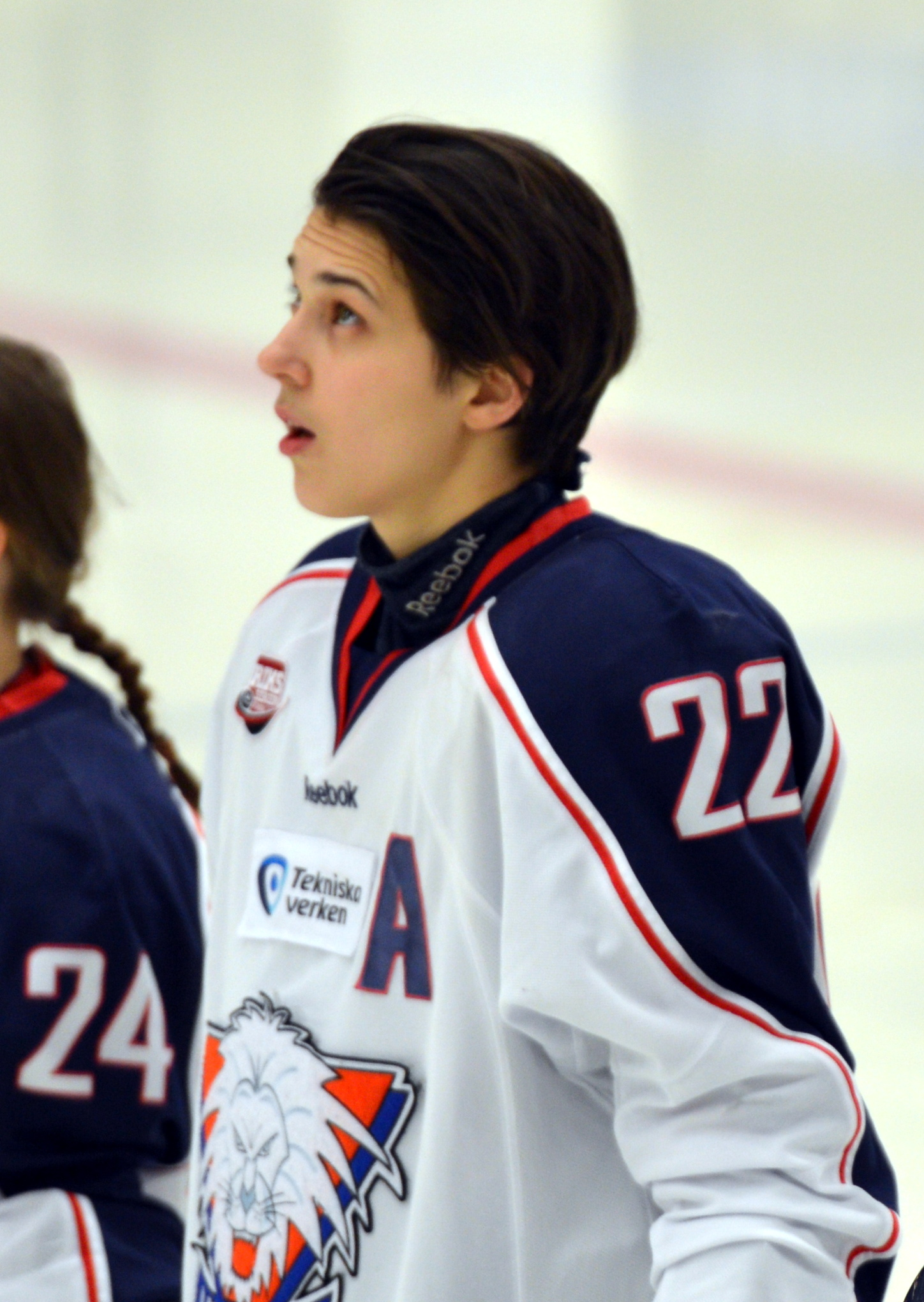
- Altmann with Linköping HC Dam during the Riksserien Playoff Finals against AIK Hockey Dam, March 2015.
- Born: 1 November 1987 (age 38) Vienna, Austria
- Height: 175 cm (5 ft 9 in)
- Weight: 68 kg (150 lb; 10 st 10 lb)
- Position: Forward
- Shoots: Left
- SDHL team: Linköping HC
- Played for: EHV Sabres Wien
- National team: Austria
- Playing career: 2005–present

Denise Altmann is an Austrian ice hockey forward, currently playing for Linköping HC in the SDHL and the Austrian national team. She is the SDHL's all-time leader in points, having led the league in scoring five times between 2009 and 2015, and winning the SDHL championship twice.

== Career ==
She began her career with EHV Sabres Wien, and would score 122 points across 32 games in the EWHL, winning the championship in 2005.

In 2007, Altmann signed with Linköping in Sweden, where she continues to play to this day. Across 13 seasons with the team, she has put up 563 points in 337 games. In 2017, she announced her decision to retire but reversed that decision a few months later, coming back to be named club captain, after having served as an assistant captain for the previous five years.

=== International ===
She was named best forward at the 2008 IIHF Women's World Championship Division II, as Austria earned promotion. She would again be named best forward at the 2012 IIHF Women's World Championship Division I and the 2017 IIHF Women's World Championship Division I.

== Personal life ==
Her brother Mario plays professionally for EHC Linz. Outside of hockey, she works as a nurse.
