= Hanna Sköld =

Swedish ice hockey player

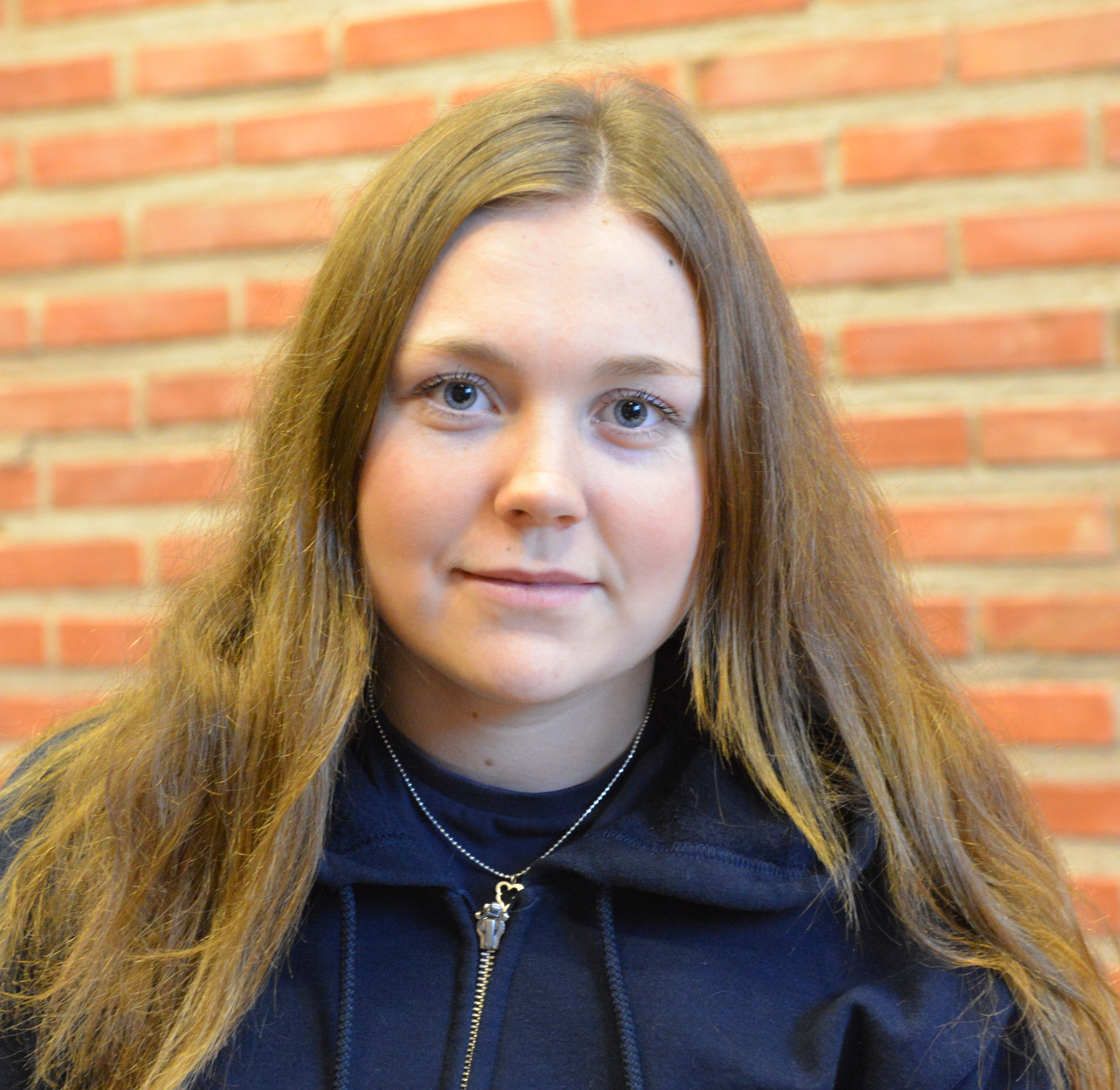
- Born: 4 July 1997 (age 27); Avesta, Sweden
- Height: 168 cm (5 ft 6 in)
- Weight: 73 kg (161 lb; 11 st 7 lb)
- Position: Forward
- Shoots: Left
- SDHL team Former teams: Leksands IF; Göteborg HC; Avesta BK
- National team: Sweden
- Playing career: 2013–present

Hanna Sköld (born 4 July 1997) is a Swedish ice hockey forward, currently playing for Leksands IF Dam in the Swedish Women's Hockey League (SDHL). She served as Leksands captain during 2019 to 2022, and has appeared intermittently with the Swedish national team.

== Playing career ==
Growing up in Avesta, Sköld began playing hockey around the age of five, being taught by her father. She lived in Avesta until she was 16, playing as the only girl on the local boys' teams, when she began high school and moved to Leksands, signing with Riksserien club Leksands IF. She scored 9 points in 25 games in her rookie Riksserien season.

She had a breakout year in 2015–16, notching a career-best 32 points in 36 games and being named to the senior Swedish roster for the World Championships. Her 20 goals made her the seventh-leading goal scorer in the league that season. Her production dropped the following season, scoring only 13 points in 25 games as she missed a significant chunk of the season due to an elbow injury suffered while on international duty.

In 2017, she left Leksands to sign with newly-promoted Göteborg HC and to study in Halmstad. She would only put up 9 points in 33 games during the 2017–18 season, as the club finished last in the league.

After only one year in Göteborg, she returned to Leksands, citing her love for the city as the motivation behind her return. Ahead of the 2019–20 season, she was named Leksands captain.

== International career ==
Sköld represented Sweden at the 2014 and 2015 IIHF World Women's U18 Championship, scoring one point in ten games across both tournaments. She was called up to the senior national team for the first time in 2015, appearing in a match against Finland held in Åland. She made her senior World Championship debut at the 2016 IIHF Women's World Championship but did not pick up any points in five games.
