= Sofia Engström =

Swedish ice hockey player

- Born: 3 July 1988 (age 37) Ramnäs, Sweden
- Height: 1.63 m (5 ft 4 in)
- Weight: 63 kg (139 lb; 9 st 13 lb)
- Position: Defense
- Shoots: Left
- SDHL team Former teams: Modo Hockey; Leksands IF; Örebro HK
- National team: Sweden
- Playing career: 2006–present

Sofia Engström (born 3 July 1988) is a Swedish ice hockey defenceman and member of the Swedish national ice hockey team, currently playing with Modo Hockey Dam of the Swedish Women's Hockey League (SDHL). As of the conclusion of the 2020–21 SDHL season, she is the longest tenured player in league history, having played 396 games across fourteen SDHL seasons,

== Career ==
Engström joined Leksands IF during the 2007–08 Riksserien season. She made her National Series debut during the 2008–09 National Series against Brynäs. During 2009 to 2014 she served as the club's captain.

On 26 February 2015, Engström played her 200th game with Leksands IF. She signed a one-year contract with Leksands IF on 24 July 2015. She played her 300th game with Leksands IF on 16 October 2017.

She signed an extension with Leksands IF on 2 May 2018.

In June 2019, she left Leksands to sign with Modo Hockey.

== International career ==
While serving as captain of Leksands IF, Engström made her national team debut with Team Sweden at the 2012 4 Nations Cup.

Engström was selected for the Sweden women's national ice hockey team in the 2014 Winter Olympics. She played in all six games, not recording a point. She was also named to Team Sweden's roster to compete at the 2018 4 Nations Cup in Saskatoon.

She played for Sweden at the 2019 IIHF Women's World Championship, scoring two goals in five games as the country finished in ninth and was relegated for the first time in history.

== Career statistics ==
=== International career ===
| Year | Team | Event | GP | G | A | Pts | PIM |
|---|---|---|---|---|---|---|---|
| 2014 | Sweden | Oly | 6 | 0 | 0 | 0 | 0 |
