= Nationella Damhockeyligan =

Swedish ice hockey league

- Formerly: Division 1, 2007–2015; Damettan, 2015–2021
- Sport: Ice hockey
- Founded: 2007
- Founder: Swedish Ice Hockey Association
- First season: as Division 1; Premier league, 1988–89; Second league, 2007–08; as DamEttan, 2015–16; as NDHL, 2021–22
- No. of teams: 27
- Country: Sweden
- Most recent champions: Färjestad BK & Södertälje SK (2024–25)
- Promotion to: SDHL
- Relegation to: Damtvåan
- Website: ndhlsverige.se

Nationella Damhockeyligan (lit. 'National Women's Hockey League') or NDHL is the second-highest women's ice hockey league in Sweden. It was previously known as the Damettan or Damettan i ishockey during 2015 to 2021, and Division 1 during 2007 to 2015. The league engages in active promotion and relegation with the top-tier Swedish Women's Hockey League (SDHL) and the third-tier Damtvåan.

Beginning with the first official women's ice hockey Swedish Championship in 1988, the Division 1 served as the premier league for women's ice hockey and the winner of its playoffs was named Swedish Champion. During the 2007–08 season, the best Division 1 teams qualified for a newly created premier league, the Riksserien (renamed SDHL in 2016), at which point Division 1 was reconfigured as the second-tier league.

Bodychecking was allowed for the 2022–2023 season.

== League ==
=== Season structure ===
The current NDHL season structure was first implemented in the 2021–22 season and minor modifications have subsequently been made. Unlike the SDHL, which is governed entirely by the Swedish Ice Hockey Association (SIF), or the Damtvåan, which is governed entirely by regional ice hockey associations, the governance of the NDHL is split between regional associations and the SIF. Regional associations oversee their respective the NDHL DamEttan divisions until teams have been selected for the regional qualifier. The SIF oversees the Dam HockeyAllsvenskan, the regional qualifier, the Dam HockeyAllsvenskan playoffs, and the Kvalserie till SDHL.

==== NDHL DamEttan ====
The season begins with four regional series, collectively called the Damettan (lit. 'Women's First'). Teams are sorted into one of four geographical divisions: NDHL Damettan Norra (North), NDHL Damettan Östra (East), NDHL Damettan Södra (South), and NDHL Damettan Västra (West). Each Damettan division is administered locally by a regional sub-organ of the SIF, which results in some structural and regulatory differences between divisions, for example, the number of games played and the manner in which teams are selected for the regional qualifier.

==== Dam HockeyAllsvenskan ====
The two top-ranking teams from each Damettan division qualify for the Damhockeyallsvenskan (lit. 'Women's Hockey All-Sweden'), which is administered directly by the Swedish Ice Hockey Association and is generally played during February. Damettan divisions are partially merged for the Damhockeyallsvenskan to form two groups of four teams: Norr/Väst (lit. 'North/West'), called Damhockeyallsvenskan Norra, and Syd/Öst (lit. 'South/East'), called Damhockeyallsvenskan Södra. Each group is played as a double round-robin; the top-three teams progress to the NDHL playoffs, while the teams placing fourth qualify for the next NDHL Damettan season.

==== Regional qualifier ====
In mid-February, the top teams from the NDHL Damettan Östra, Södra, and Västra compete for the remaining playoff berths in a regional qualifier (Swedish: regionalt förkval). Each division used a different method for determining its top team The series is played as a single round-robin; the top two teams earn positions in the NDHL playoffs and the third-place team qualifies for the next NDHL Damettan season.

==== Playoffs ====
The NDHL playoffs feature the top-three teams from the two divisions of the Dam HockeyAllsvenskan and the top-two teams from the regional qualifier. The divisions from the Dam HockeyAllsvenskan – Norra and Södra – remain in place and one team from the regional qualifier is added to each of the divisions. Each round is played using a best-of-three format.

==== Kvalserie till SDHL ====
The Dam HockeyAllsvenskan playoff champions earn the opportunity to compete in the Kvalserie till SDHL ('qualification series for the SDHL'), in which they play against the two bottom ranked teams from the SDHL regular season. The teams ranking first and second in the kvalserie earn placement in the SDHL for the following season, meaning one or both NDHL teams can gain promotion to the SDHL and one or both of the SDHL teams can be relegated to the NDHL DamEttan.

== Teams ==
=== 2024–25 NDHL DamEttan teams ===
NDHL DamEttan Norra

Team	Location	Home venue	Head coach	Captain
Clemensnäs HC/ Skellefteå AIK 2	Skellefteå	Skellefteå Kraft Arena	Clara Markeby	Thelma Stenlund
IF Björklöven	Umeå	Visionite Arena	Christer Nilsson	Sanna Augustsson
Luleå HF 2	Luleå	Coop Norrbotten Arena	Daniel Lundberg	Sigrid Sundin
MoDo Hockey 2	Örnsköldsvik	Hägglunds Arena	Sofia Engström	Ebba Lindberg

NDHL DamEttan Östra

Team	Location	Home venue	Head coach	Captain
AIK	Solna	Ulriksdals IP	Robert Johansson	Petra Matějová
Hammarby IF	Stockholm	Zinkensdamms IP	Conny Olausson	Flóra Tóth
Haninge Anchors HC	Haninge	Torvalla Ishall	Magnus Berg	Anna Löfstedt
SDE HF 2	Stocksund	Enebybergs Ishall	Hanna Blomqvist	Julia Cansund-Lundin
SHK Hockey Club	Skärplinge	PEK-Hallen	Jan Lundvall	Elin Lundvall
Södertälje SK	Södertälje	Scaniarinken	Thomas Holmberg	Hunter Mosher
Team Uppsala HC	Uppsala	Gränby Ishall	Richard Nilsson	Sandra Johansson

NDHL DamEttan Södra

Team	Location	Home venue(s)	Head coach	Captain
Hvidovre IK	(Denmark) Hvidovre	Frihedens Idrætscenter	René Sloth	Julie Røder Henriksen
Järnbrotts HK	Gothenburg	Slottsskogens Ishall	Sebatian Lökkeberg	Hilda Södergren
Karlskrona HK	Karlskrona	NKT Arena Karlskrona	Mickael Areklätt	Elina Karlsson
Linköping HC 2	Linköping	Stångebro Ishall & Saab Arena	Christopher Hamell	Tindra Åkelid
IF Malmö Redhawks	Malmö	Malmö Isstadion	Henrik Palm	Amie Varano
Rögle BK	Ängelholm	Catena Arena	Julius Falkenbäck Bergkvist	Wilma Hjelm
Rödovre SoIK	(Denmark) Rødovre	Rødovre Centrum Arena	Mikkel Persson	Emma Russell
IF Troja-Ljungby	Ljungby	Ljungby Arena	Linnéa Engstrand	Wilma Nilsson

NDHL DamEttan Västra

Team	Location	Home venue(s)	Head coach	Captain
Brynäs IF 2	Gävle	Monitor ERP Arena	Andreas Östlund	Izabel Ryding
Färjestad BK	Karlstad	Löfbergs Arena	Johan Fransson	Julia Pettersson
Hallstahammars HK	Hallstahammar	Swetex Arena	Mats Skog	Wilma Nurmi
Hedesunda IF	Hedesunda	Hedesunda Ishall	Eric Friberg	Wilma Lööf
Leksands IF 2	Leksand	Tegera Arena	Anna Aldrin-Borgqvist	Alicia Lillerskog
Mora IK	Mora	Smidjegrav Arena	Viktor Amnér	Ellinor Wikström
Örebro HK	Örebro	Behrn Arena	Evelina Husar	Julia Hagnäs

=== 2024–25 Dam HockeyAllsvenskan teams ===
Dam HockeyAllsvenskan Norra

1. Södertälje SK
2. AIK
3. Hammarby IF
4. Haninge Anchors HC
5. IF Björklöven

Dam HockeyAllsvenskan Södra

1. Färjestad BK
2. Rögle BK
3. Örebro HK
4. IF Malmö Redhawks
5. IF Troja-Ljungby
