= Linköping HC (women) =

SDHL ice hockey team in Linköping, Sweden

- City: Linköping, Sweden
- League: SDHL
- Founded: 2007
- Home arena: Stångebro Ishall
- Colours: Blue, white, red
- General manager: Sabina Eriksson
- Head coach: Jan Bylesjö
- Captain: Sara Hjalmarsson
- Affiliates: Linköping HC 2 (NDHL); Linköping HC 3 (Damtvåan)
- Parent club: Linköping HC
- Website: lhc.eu

Championships
- Playoff championships: 2 (2013–14, 2014–15)

Linköping HC or LHC is a semi-professional ice hockey team in the Swedish Women's Hockey League (SDHL). It is the representative women's team of Linköping HC, an ice hockey club based in Linköping, Sweden, and is sometimes distinguished from the men's team as Linköping HC Dam (lit. 'Linköping HC Women'; LHC Dam) or Linköping HC SDHL. The team plays in Linköping at the Stångebro Ishall. LHC won the Swedish Championship in 2014 and 2015.

== History ==
In 2006, the Linköping HC organization committed to becoming the best club for women's ice hockey in Sweden, stating that the women's team would be one of the club’s elite teams, on equal footing with the men's professional team and junior teams. The team made its debut in the group stage of the 2007–08 season of Division 1 (since renamed Damettan) and swept the eight-game series. Their early success earned the LHC Dam a spot in the top-tier, newly-restructured and renamed Riksserien (since renamed the Svenska damhockeyligan), where they finished the 2008 season in fourth place after losing the bronze medal game to Modo HK. The 2007–08 roster featured home-grown Swedish players, including veteran Sophie Westlund and rising stars 19 year old Jenni Asserholt and 16 year old Fanny Rask, alongside an impressive collection of young international talent, including Austrian national team phenom Denise Altmann and Slovak national team teammates, forward Iveta Karafiátová (now Frühauf) and goaltender Zuzana Tomčíková.

In the 2008–09 Riksserien season, LHC Dam lost in the quarterfinals after finishing the regular season in fifth place. The team gradually increased their standing over the subsequent seasons, ranking fourth in 2010 and winning bronze in 2011.

The team won the Swedish Championship in 2014. Not content to rest on their laurels, Linköping went on to win all 28 regular season games in the 2014–15 season and successfully defended the Swedish Championship in the 2015 SDHL playoffs, defeating AIK in the second consecutive playoff finals.

== Season-by-season results ==
This is a partial list of the most recent seasons completed by Linköping HC Dam.
Note: Rank = Rank at end of regular season; GP = Games played, W = Wins (3 points), OTW = Overtime wins (2 points), OTL = Overtime losses (1 point), L = Losses, GF = Goals for, GA = Goals against, Pts = Points, Top scorer: Points (Goals+Assists)

| Season | League | Regular season | | | | | | | | | | Postseason results |
| Season | League | Rank | GP | W | OTW | OTL | L | Pts | GF | GA | Top scorer | Postseason results |
|---|---|---|---|---|---|---|---|---|---|---|---|---|
| 2015-16 | Riksserien | 2nd | 36 | 25 | 5 | 2 | 4 | 87 | 154 | 60 | (Sweden) P. Winberg 56 (19+37) | (silver) Lost finals to Luleå, 1–2 |
| 2016–17 | SDHL | 3rd | 36 | 24 | 2 | 2 | 8 | 78 | 138 | 75 | (Canada) J. Wakefield 53 (34+19) | Lost semifinals to Djurgården, 1–2 |
| 2017–18 | SDHL | 2nd | 36 | 26 | 3 | 3 | 4 | 87 | 135 | 59 | (Switzerland) L. Stalder 61 (39+22) | (silver) Lost finals to Luleå, 1–2 |
| 2018–19 | SDHL | 3rd | 36 | 24 | 1 | 1 | 10 | 75 | 137 | 77 | (Canada) K. Marchment 52 (25+27) | (silver) Lost finals to Luleå, 2–3 |
| 2019–20 | SDHL | 7th | 36 | 10 | 3 | 4 | 19 | 40 | 73 | 107 | (United States) Z. Hickel 26 (12+14) | Lost quarterfinals to Luleå, 0–2 |
| 2020–21 | SDHL | 5th | 36 | 17 | 3 | 2 | 14 | 59 | 89 | 76 | (United States) C. Bullock 35 (18+17) | Lost quarterfinals to Djurgården, 0–2 |
| 2021–22 | SDHL | 2nd | 36 | 23 | 3 | 2 | 8 | 118 | 79 | 77 | (United States) S. Brodt 56 (29+27) | Lost semifinals to Luleå, 1–3 |
| 2022–23 | SDHL | 7th | 32 | 6 | 7 | 2 | 17 | 69 | 97 | 34 | (Canada) N. Elia 30 (17+13) | Lost quarterfinals to Brynäs, 0–2 |
| 2023–24 | SDHL | 6th | 36 | 17 | 1 | 4 | 14 | 104 | 90 | 57 | (Japan) H. Toko 43 (13+30) | Lost quarterfinals to Brynäs, 0–2 |

== Players and personnel ==
=== 2024–25 roster ===
As of 10 October 2024

| No. | Nat | Player | Pos | S/G | Age | Acquired | Birthplace |
|---|---|---|---|---|---|---|---|
| 6 | (Canada) | Lindsay Agnew | D | L | 28 | 2024 | Oakville, Ontario, Canada |
| 57 | (Sweden) | Emmy Alasalmi | D | R | 32 | 2024 | Stockholm, Uppland, Sweden |
| 20 | (Sweden) | Lova Blom (A) | C | L | 23 | 2023 | Stockholm, Södermanland, Sweden |
| 8 | (Canada) | Ann-Frédérique Guay | F | R | 25 | 2024 | St-Lambert-de-Lauzon, Quebec, Canada |
| 18 | (Sweden) | Moa Gustafsson | LW | L | 21 | 2022 | Stockholm, Sweden |
| 44 | (Sweden) | Jorinde Heller | G | L | 19 | 2022 | Linköping, Östergötland, Sweden |
| 4 | (Japan) | Ayaka Hitosato | D | R | 31 | 2022 | Higashimurayama, Kantō, Japan |
| 19 | (Sweden) | Sara Hjalmarsson (C) | C | L | 28 | 2023 | Bankeryd, Småland, Sweden |
| 7 | (Sweden) | Ella Jämsén | F | L | 22 | 2020 | Södertälje, Södermanland, Sweden |
| 40 | (Sweden) | Felicia Levin | F | L | 22 | 2024 | |
| 15 | (Sweden) | Thea Liodden | D | L | 20 | 2024 | Hällefors, Västmanland, Sweden |
| 16 | (Norway) | Marthe Pabsdorff Brunvold | C | L | 25 | 2018 | Løten, Østlandet, Norway |
| 9 | (Czech Republic) | Kristýna Pátková | F | R | 28 | 2023 | Meziboří, Ústecký kraj, Czechia |
| 13 | (Sweden) | Emma Rehn | C | L | 20 | 2020 | Linköping, Östergötland, Sweden |
| 21 | (United States) | Naomi Rogge | F | L | 27 | 2024 | Eden Prairie, Minnesota, United States |
| 5 | (Finland) | Eve Savander | D | R | 27 | 2024 | Joensuu, North Karelia, Finland |
| 91 | (Sweden) | Olivia Sohrner | D | L | 21 | 2024 | Stockholm, Uppland, Sweden |
| 1 | (Sweden) | Ebba Svensson Träff | G | L | 21 | 2020 | Oskarshamn, Småland, Sweden |
| 14 | (Japan) | Haruka Toko | F | L | 29 | 2022 | Tokyo, Kantō, Japan |
| 23 | (Sweden) | Moa Wernblom | LW | L | 28 | 2024 | Örnsköldsvik, Ångermanland, Sweden |
| 44 | (Netherlands) | Savine Wielenga | F | R | 37 | 2024 | The Hague, Zuid-Holland, Netherlands |
| 17 | (Sweden) | Felicia Öhrqvist | D | L | 21 | 2024 | Solna, Uppland, Sweden |

Coaching staff and team personnel

- Head coach: Jan Bylesjö
- Assistant coach: Fredrik Eriksson
- Conditioning coach: Anders Järlung
- Equipment managers: Dan Eriksson & Mattias Wilzén

=== Team captains ===
- Hanna Dahl, 2007–2012
- Jenni Asserholt, 2012–2015
- Kristina Vikdahl, 2015–16
- (Finland) Minttu Tuominen, 2016–17
- (Austria) Denise Altmann, 2017–18
- (Norway) Ingrid Morset, 2018–2020
- (Norway) Madelen Haug Hansen, 2020–2023
- Sara Hjalmarsson, 2023–

=== Head coaches ===
- Peter Jonsson, 2007–08
- Johanna Olsson, 2008–09
- Roy Bergström & Peter Jonsson, 2009–10
- Jens Brändström, 2010–2012
- Johan Bunnstedt, 2012–13
- Daniel Elander, 2013–14
- Peter Frantz, 2014–2016
- Martin Andler, 2016–17
- Madeleine Östling, 2017–2020
- (Norway) Thomas Pettersen, 2020–2022
- Simon Hedefalk, 2022–23
- Jan Bylesjö, 2023–

=== General managers ===
- Jens Brändström, –2014
- Johan Bunnstedt, 2014–15
- Kim Martin Hasson, 2015–2019
- Madeleine Östling, 2022–23
- Sabina Eriksson, 2023–

== Team honors ==
=== Swedish Women's Hockey League ===
- (gold) Swedish Champions (2): 2014, 2015
- (silver) Runners-up (3): 2016, 2018, 2019
- (bronze) Third Place (1): 2011

=== IIHF European Women's Champions Cup ===
- (silver) Runners-up (1): 2014–15

== Team records and leaders ==
=== Single-season records ===
Note: Skaters playing less than 20 games and goaltenders playing in 10 or fewer games during a season are not included.

- Most goals: Lara Stalder, 39 goals (36 games; 2017–18)
- Most assists: Denise Altmann, 43 assists (28 games; 2014–15)
- Most points: Denise Altmann, 67 points (28 games; 2014–15)
- Most points in a season, defenseman: Sidney Morin, 38 points (32 games; 2018–19)
- Most points per game (P/G): Denise Altmann, 2.39 P/G (28 games; 2014–15)
- Most penalty minutes (PIM): Jenn Wakefield, 90 PIM (31 games; 2020–21)
- Best save percentage (SVS%): Kim Martin Hasson, .956 SVS% (17 games; 2016–17)
- Best goals against average (GAA): Vendela Jonsson, 0.91 GAA (11 games; 2014–15)
- Most shutouts: Florence Schelling, 10 shutouts (31 games; 2017–18)

=== Career records ===
Note: Skaters playing less than 30 games and goaltenders playing in 15 or fewer games during their career with Linköping HC are not included.

- Most goals: Denise Altmann, 277 goals (337 games; 2007–2020)
- Most assists: Denise Altmann, 286 assists (337 games; 2007–2020)
- Most points: Denise Altmann, 563 points (337 games; 2007–2020)
- Most points, defenseman: Emma Holmbom, 129 points (253 games; 2008–2018)
- Most points per game: Lara Stalder, 1.83 P/G (54 games; 2017–2019)
- Most penalty minutes: Jenn Wakefield, 215 PIM (94 games; 2014–2021)
- Most games played, skater: Madelen Haug Hansen, 367 games (2012–2024)
- Most games played, goaltender: Florence Schelling, 62 games (2015–2018)
- Best save percentage: Florence Schelling, .948 SVS% (62 games; 2015–2018)
- Best goals against average: Vendela Jonsson, 1.33 GAA (21 games; 2010–2015)
- Most shutouts: Florence Schelling, 16 shutouts (62 games; 2015–2018)

=== All-time scoring leaders ===
The top ten point-scorers in Linköping HC history, from the 2007–08 season through the 2023–24 season.

Note: Nat = Nationality; Pos = Position; GP = Games played; G = Goals; A = Assists; Pts = Points; P/G = Points per game; = 2024–25 Linköping HC player

Points
| Nat | Player | Pos | GP | G | A | Pts | P/G |
|---|---|---|---|---|---|---|---|
| (Austria) | Denise Altmann | RW | 337 | 277 | 286 | 563 | 1.67 |
| (Norway) | Madelen Haug Hansen | W | 367 | 97 | 162 | 259 | 0.71 |
| (Sweden) | Pernilla Winberg | C/LW | 155 | 74 | 139 | 213 | 1.37 |
| (Canada) | Jenn Wakefield | C | 94 | 107 | 55 | 162 | 1.72 |
| (Sweden) | Jenni Asserholt | F | 143 | 64 | 87 | 151 | 1.06 |
| (Sweden) | Emma Holmbom | D | 253 | 31 | 98 | 129 | 0.51 |
| (Sweden) | Emilia Ramboldt | D | 229 | 23 | 91 | 114 | 0.50 |
| (Norway) | Andrea Dalen | F | 84 | 63 | 46 | 109 | 1.30 |
| (Sweden) | Anna Rydberg | C | 245 | 41 | 63 | 104 | 0.42 |
| (Norway) | Ingrid Morset | D | 328 | 32 | 69 | 101 | 0.31 |
| (Switzerland) | Lara Stalder | C | 54 | 55 | 44 | 99 | 1.83 |

== Notable alumnae ==
Years active with Linköping HC listed alongside player name.
Note: Flag indicates nation of primary IIHF eligibility; some players may have multiple citizenship.

- (Denmark) Amalie Andersen, 2016–2019
- (Sweden) Matildah Andersson, 2009–2015
- (Austria) Denise Altmann, 2007–2020
- (Denmark) Josephine Asperup, 2018–19
- (Sweden) Jenni Asserholt, 2007–08 & 2009–2015
- (France) Lore Baudrit, 2022–23
- (Austria) Sandra Borschke (-Klepp), 2009–10
- (United States) Sydney Brodt, 2021–22
- (United States) Carly Bullock, 2020–21
- (Sweden) Hanna Dahl, 2007–2012
- (Norway) Andrea Dalen, 2009–2011 & 2021–22
- (Sweden) Lisa Danielsson, 2007–2014
- (Canada) Nara Elia, 2022–2024
- (United Kingdom) Georgina Farman, 2014–2018
- (Norway) Ingvild Farstad, 2011–2014
- (Germany) Franziska Feldmeier, 2023–24
- (Norway) Madelen Haug Hansen, 2012–2024
- (Finland) Jennica Haikarainen, 2009–2012
- (New Zealand) Lyndal Heineman, 2008–2010
- (United States) Zoe Hickel, 2019–20
- (United States) Gracen Hirschy, 2020–21
- (Sweden) Emma Holmbom, 2008–2018
- (United Kingdom) Nicole Jackson, 2016–17
- (Sweden) Vendela Jonsson, 2010–2015
- (Slovakia) Iveta Karafiátová (-Frühauf), 2007–2010
- (Finland) Anna Kilponen, 2019–20
- (Sweden) Anna Kjellbin, 2010–2019
- (Germany) Laura Kluge, 2016–17
- (Norway) Emilie Kruse Johansen, 2015–2023
- (Sweden) Linnéa Johansson, 2018–2023
- (Austria) Selma Luggin, 2023–24
- (Denmark) Kamilla Lund Nielsen, 2011–2014
- (Canada) Kennedy Marchment, 2018–19
- (Sweden) Kim Martin Hasson, 2012–2016 & 2018–19
- (Switzerland) Julia Marty, 2013–14
- (Switzerland) Stefanie Marty, 2013–2015
- (Italy) Nadia Mattivi, 2017–18
- (Canada) Rhyen McGill, 2020–21
- (United States) Sidney Morin, 2018–19
- (Norway) Ingrid Morset, 2014–2024
- (Canada) Stephanie Neatby, 2020–2022
- (Denmark) Emma-Sofie Nordström, 2020–21
- (Slovenia) Pia Pren, 2015–16
- (Sweden) Emilia Ramboldt, 2013–2021
- (Sweden) Fanny Rask, 2007–2010
- (United States) Justine Reyes, 2021–22 & 2023–24
- (Sweden) Anna Rydberg, 2010–2018
- (Finland) Mia Sakström, 2007–2009
- (Switzerland) Florence Schelling, 2015–2018
- (Czech Republic) Lenka Serdar, 2021–22
- (United States) O'Hara Shipe, 2009–2011
- (Switzerland) Shannon Sigrist, 2020–2022
- (Switzerland) Lara Stalder, 2017–2019
- (Canada) Shannon Stewart, 2015–16
- (Finland) Eveliina Suonpää (-Mäkinen), 2018–2020
- (Denmark) Nicoline Söndergaard Jensen, 2016–2019
- (Finland) Vilma Tanskanen, 2019–20
- (Canada) Celine Tardif, 2020–21
- (Norway) Lene Tendenes, 2015–2023
- (Slovakia) Zuzana Tomčíková, 2007–08
- (Czech Republic) Nikola Tomigová, 2012–13
- (Finland) Minnamari Tuominen, 2016–17
- (Hungary) Enikő Tóth, 2023–24
- (Finland) Saana Valkama, 2019–20
- (Sweden) Kristina Vikdahl, 2009–2016
- (Austria) Sophia Volgger, 2015–16
- (Canada) Jenn Wakefield, 2014–2017 & 2020–21
- (Netherlands) Savine Wielenga, 2007–08
- (Sweden) Pernilla Winberg, 2014–2020
- (Austria) Charlotte Wittich, 2012–13
- (United States) Olivia Zafuto, 2021–22
