= Stångebro Ishall =

Ice sport arena in Linköping, Sweden

Coordinates: 58°25′5″N 15°38′6″E

- Stångebrohallen
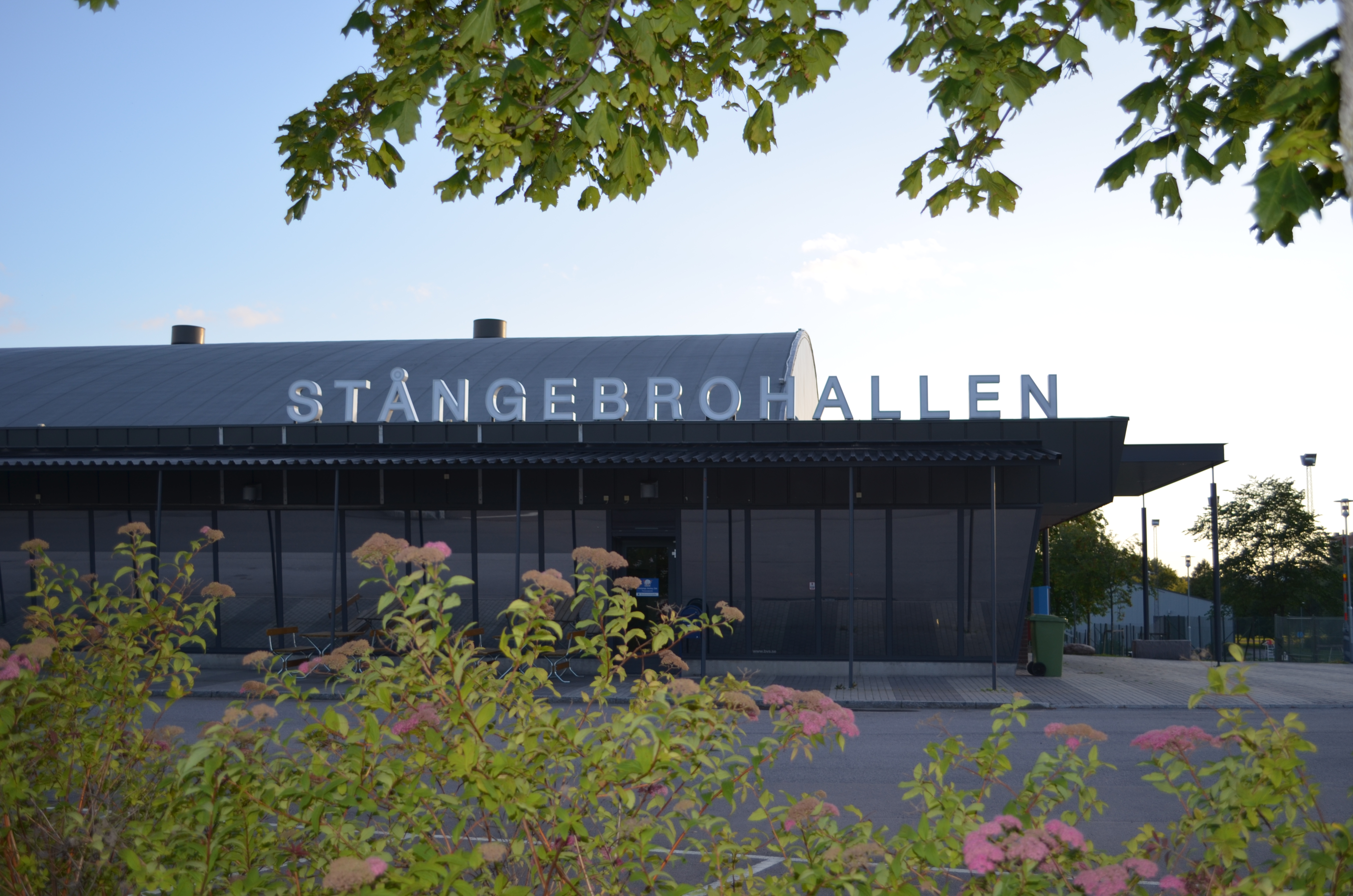
- Interactive map of Stångebro Ishall
- Location: Linköping, Sweden
- Capacity: 4,800

Construction
- Opened: 1975

Stångebro Ishall, also known as Stångebrohallen, is an arena in Linköping, Sweden. It was built in 1975 at a cost of 9.2 million krona, opening on September 14 that year. The arena's facilities include an ice rink, a tennis hall, and a bandy field. It has undergone a series of renovations over the years. The arena has a capacity of approximately 4,800 people during sport events.

It served as the home arena for the ice hockey team Linköpings HC until the 2004–05 Elitserien season, when the now-named Saab Arena replaced it.
