= Luleå HF/MSSK =

SDHL ice hockey team Luleå, Sweden

Luleå Hockey/MSSK
- City: Luleå, Sweden
- League: SDHL
- Founded: 2015
- Home arena: Coop Norrbotten Arena
- Colors: Red, black, white, yellow
- General manager: Oskar Häggström
- Head coach: Melinda Olsson
- Captain: Jenni Hiirikoski
- Website: www.luleahockey.se

Championships
- Regular season titles: 7 (2016, 2017, 2018, 2019, 2021, 2023, 2024)
- Playoff championships: 7 (2016, 2018, 2019, 2021, 2022, 2023, 2024)

Current uniform

Luleå Hockey/MSSK are a semi-professional ice hockey team in the Swedish Women's Hockey League (SDHL). They play in Luleå, a port city in northeastern Sweden, at Coop Norrbotten Arena. The team is the most successful in SDHL history, having been regular season champions for four consecutive years, 2015–2019, and winning the Swedish Championship seven times within eight years, from 2016 to 2024.

== History ==
The team was formed in 2015, after a merger between Luleå HF and Munksund Skuthamn SK (MSSK). In October 2016, the club set an SDHL attendance record with 3,150 spectators for a match against Norrland rivals MODO Hockey.

After winning the Swedish Championship in 2018, they played against that year's Isobel Cup winners, the Metropolitan Riveters of the National Women's Hockey League (NWHL), in the first-ever Champions Cup of women's ice hockey. Luleå won the match 4-2. In November that year, the club again set a new record for SDHL attendance, with 6,220 spectators for a match against AIK IF.

In 2019, the club hired Mikael Forsberg to replace Fredrik Glader, who had served as head coach for the first four seasons of the club's existence.

== Season-by-season results ==
This is a list of all seasons completed by Luleå Hockey/MSSK, since the team was founded in 2015.
Code explanation: GP—Games played, W—Wins, OTW—Overtime wins, T—Overtime losses, L—Losses, GF—Goals for, GA—Goals against, Pts—Points. Top Scorer: Points (Goals+Assists)

Season	League	Regular season										Post season results
Season	League	Finish	GP	W	OTW	OTL	L	GF	GA	Pts	Top scorer	Post season results
2015-16	SDHL	1st	36	27	2	2	5	161	60	87	(Finland) M. Karvinen 79 (37+42)	Won Championship, 2-1 (Linköping)
2016-17	SDHL	1st	36	32	0	0	4	168	52	96	(Finland) M. Karvinen 70 (30+40)	Lost semi-finals, 0-2 (HV71)
2017-18	SDHL	1st	36	29	3	2	2	160	58	95	(Finland) M. Karvinen 68 (30+38)	Won Championship, 2-1 (Linköping)
2018-19	SDHL	1st	36	30	1	1	4	166	52	93	(Finland) J. Hiirikoski 63 (19+44)	Won Championship, 3-2 (Linköping)
2019-20	SDHL	2nd	36	24	4	1	7	141	61	81	(Finland) P. Nieminen 55 (25+30)	Cancelled due to COVID-19 pandemic
2020-21	SDHL	1st	36	32	1	1	2	159	52	99	(Canada) M. Cava 66 (29+37)	Won Championship, 3-0 (Brynäs)
2021–22	SDHL	3rd	36	21	4	4	7	131	79	75	(Finland) P. Nieminen 55 (26+29)	Won Championship, 3-2 (Brynäs)
2022–23	SDHL	1st	32	27	3	0	2	140	39	87	(Finland) N. Tulus 56 (22+34)	Won Championship, 3-0 (Brynäs)
2023–24	SDHL	1st	36	29	4	1	2	173	62	96	(Finland) N. Tulus 61 (22+39)	Won Championship, 3-0 (Brynäs IF)

== Players and personnel ==
=== 2024–25 roster ===
As of 6 January 2025

No.	Nat	Player	Pos	S/G	Age	Acquired	Birthplace
10	(Sweden)	Anna Andersson	D	L	22	2019	Själevad, Ångermanland, Sweden
31	(Sweden)	Frida Axell	G	L	24	2021	Gothenburg, Västergötland, Sweden
24	(Sweden)	Ella Bergström	F	L	21	2024	Älvsbyn, Norrbotten, Sweden
62	(Canada)	Sarah Bujold	F	L	29	2024	Riverview, New Brunswick, Canada
5	(Sweden)	Johanna Fällman	D	L	35	2024	Luleå, Norrbotten, Sweden
52	(Sweden)	Sara Grahn	G	L	37	2018	Örebro, Närke, Sweden
6	(Finland)	Jenni Hiirikoski (C)	D	L	38	2016	Lempäälä, Pirkanmaa, Finland
15	(Canada)	Reece Hunt	F	L	24	2024	Nelson, British Columbia, Canada
18	(Sweden)	Ebba Hörnquist	D	L	18	2024	Skellefteå, Västerbotten, Sweden
77	(Sweden)	Linnéa Johansson	LW	L	23	2023	Ljungby, Småland, Sweden
21	(Sweden)	Astrid Lindeberg	D	L	20	2021	Stocksund, Uppland, Sweden
26	(Sweden)	Sara Lindqvist	LW	L	20	2022	Storuman, Lapland, Sweden
27	(Canada)	Jaycee Magwood	F	L	28	2023	Killarney, Manitoba, Canada
93	(Italy)	Nadia Mattivi	D	L	25	2024	Trento, Trentino-Alto Adige, Italy
16	(Finland)	Petra Nieminen	C	L	26	2018	Tampere, Pirkanmaa, Finland
71	(United States)	Savannah Norcross	F	R	25	2024	Lynn, Massachusetts, United States
29	(Sweden)	Emma Nordin	C	L	34	2022	Örnsköldsvik, Ångermanland, Sweden
39	(Sweden)	Inez Nygren	F	L	17	2024	Lycksele, Lapland, Sweden
17	(Canada)	Erica Rieder	D	L	29	2024	Regina, Saskatchewan, Canada
11	(Japan)	Akane Shiga	F	R	24	2024	Obihiro, Hokkaido, Japan
19	(Sweden)	Stella Sjöberg	LW	L	18	2023	Stockholm, Uppland, Sweden
7	(Sweden)	Tilde Sjödin	D	L	21	2020	Vilhelmina, Lapland, Sweden
14	(Sweden)	Wilma Sjölund	C	R	22	2019	Sundsvall, Medelpad, Sweden
8	(Sweden)	Hedvig Sturk	D	L	19	2023	Österhaninge, Södermanland, Sweden
42	(Finland)	Viivi Vainikka	RW/C	L	24	2020	Espoo, Uusimaa, Finland
3	(Canada)	Camryn Wong	D	R	25	2024	Vancouver, British Columbia, Canada

Coaching staff and team personnel

- Head coach: Melinda Olsson
- Assistant coach: Rosa Lindstedt
- Goaltending coach: Maria Omberg
- Equipment manager: Carina Marnéus

=== Team captains ===
- Emma Eliasson, 2015–2017
- Jenni Hiirikoski, 2017–present

=== Head coaches ===
- Lisa Flemström, 2013–14
- Oskar Häggström, 2014–15
- Fredrik Glader, 2015–2019
- Mikael Forsberg, 2019–November 2022
- Jens Själin, 2023–24
- Melinda Olsson, 2024–

== Franchise records and leaders ==
As of 24 March 2023

=== Regular season ===
- Most goals in a season: Michelle Karvinen, 37 (2015–16)
- Most assists in a season: Jenni Hiirikoski, 44 (2018–19)
- Most points in a season: Michelle Karvinen, 79 (2015–16)
- Most points in a season, defenseman: Jenni Hiirikoski, 63 (2018–19)
- Best save percentage in a season, over ten games played: Frida Axell, .944 (2022–23)
- Best goals against average in a season, over ten games played: Frida Axell, 1.00 (2022–23)

=== Career ===
- Most games played, skater: Jenni Hiirikoski, 239
- Most games played, goaltender: Sara Grahn, 114
- Most shutouts in a career: Sara Grahn, 24
- Most penalty minutes in a career: Ronja Savolainen, 251

=== Scoring leaders ===
The top-ten point-scorers (goals + assists) of Luleå Hockey/MSSK from the 2015–16 season through the 2023–24 season. Note: Pos = Position; GP = Games played; G = Goals; A = Assists; Pts = Points; P/G = Points per game; = 2024–25 Luleå HF/MSSK player

Nat	Player	Pos	GP	G	A	Pts	P/G
(Sweden)	Emma Nordin	C	265	183	222	405	1.53
(Finland)	Jenni Hiirikoski	D	275	99	266	365	1.33
(Finland)	Noora Tulus	RW	254	111	214	325	1.28
(Finland)	Michelle Karvinen	W	152	141	173	314	2.07
(Finland)	Petra Nieminen	C	201	142	137	279	1.39
(Finland)	Ronja Savolainen	D	258	81	146	227	0.88
(Finland)	Viivi Vainikka	C	136	76	83	159	1.17
(Denmark)	Josefine Høegh Persson	W	230	62	87	149	0.65
(Sweden)	Linn Peterson	RW/C	173	40	66	106	0.61
(Sweden)	Johanna Fällman	D	234	26	62	88	0.38
