= Paula Bergström =

Swedish ice hockey player

- Born: January 26, 1999 (age 27) Örnsköldsvik, Sweden
- Height: 1.72 m (5 ft 8 in)
- Weight: 73 kg (161 lb; 11 st 7 lb)
- Position: Defense
- Shoots: Left
- team Former teams: Frölunda HC; LIU Sharks; UMD Bulldogs; MoDo
- National team: Sweden
- Playing career: 2013–present

Paula Bergström (born January 26, 1999) is a Swedish ice hockey player. She played with the Sweden women's national ice hockey team that participated in women's ice hockey tournament at the 2022 Winter Olympics.

== Awards and honours ==
- 2023 NEWHA Defender of the Year
- 2023 NEWHA First Team All-Star
