= Linnéa Andersson =

Swedish ice hockey player (born 1998)

- Born: 30 September 1998 (age 28) Eksjö, Sweden
- Height: 171 cm (5 ft 7 in)
- Weight: 64 kg (141 lb; 10 st 1 lb)
- Position: Defenceman
- Shoots: Right
- SDHL team: MoDo Hockey
- National team: Sweden
- Playing career: 2016–present

Linnéa Ester Josefin Andersson (born 30 September 1998) is a Swedish ice hockey defender for MoDo Hockey of the Swedish Women's Hockey League (SDHL) and a member of Sweden women's national ice hockey team.

== Playing career ==
Andersson began her professional career with HV71 of the SDHL during the 2016-17 season. She was named alternate captain of HV71 in the 2021-22 season. She signed to MoDo Hockey for the 2022-23 season and was named alternate captain.

== International play ==
Andersson represented Sweden at the 2016 IIHF U18 Women's World Championship where the team won a bronze medal. She then was named to the national team in 2018 and played for Sweden at the 2022 Winter Olympics, where the team placed 8th, and the 2026 Winter Olympics.
