= Munksund-Skuthamns SK =

Swedish football club

- Full name: Munksund-Skuthamns Sportklubb
- Ground: Idrottsparken, Munksund; Piteå; Sweden
- League: Division 4 Norrbotten Södra
Home colours	Away colours

Munksund-Skuthamns SK (abbreviated as MSSK) is a Swedish football club located in Munksund, Piteå.

== Background ==
Munksund-Skuthamns SK currently plays in Division 4 Norrbotten Södra which is the sixth tier of Swedish football. They play their home matches at the Idrottsparken, Munksund in Piteå.

The club is affiliated to Norrbottens Fotbollförbund. MSSK also run a successful ladies ice-hockey section and the ladies first team plays in the Riksserien 2011–12.

== Season to season ==
Season	Level	Division	Section	Position	Movements
1999	Tier 5	Division 4	Norrbotten Södra	10th	Relegated
2000	Tier 6	Division 5	Norrbotten Södra	2nd	
2001	Tier 6	Division 5	Norrbotten Södra	5th	
2002	Tier 6	Division 5	Norrbotten Södra	4th	
2003	Tier 6	Division 5	Norrbotten Södra	2nd	Promoted
2004	Tier 5	Division 4	Norrbotten Södra	3rd	
2005	Tier 5	Division 4	Norrbotten Södra	3rd	
2006*	Tier 6	Division 4	Norrbotten Södra	2nd	Promoted
2007	Tier 5	Division 3	Norra Norrland	12th	Relegated
2008	Tier 6	Division 4	Norrbotten Södra	10th	Relegated
2009	Tier 7	Division 5	Norrbotten Södra	2nd	Promoted
2010	Tier 6	Division 4	Norrbotten Södra	9th	
2011	Tier 6	Division 4	Norrbotten Södra	7th	

* League restructuring in 2006 resulted in a new division being created at Tier 3 and subsequent divisions dropping a level.
