= Janine Weber =

Austrian ice hockey player

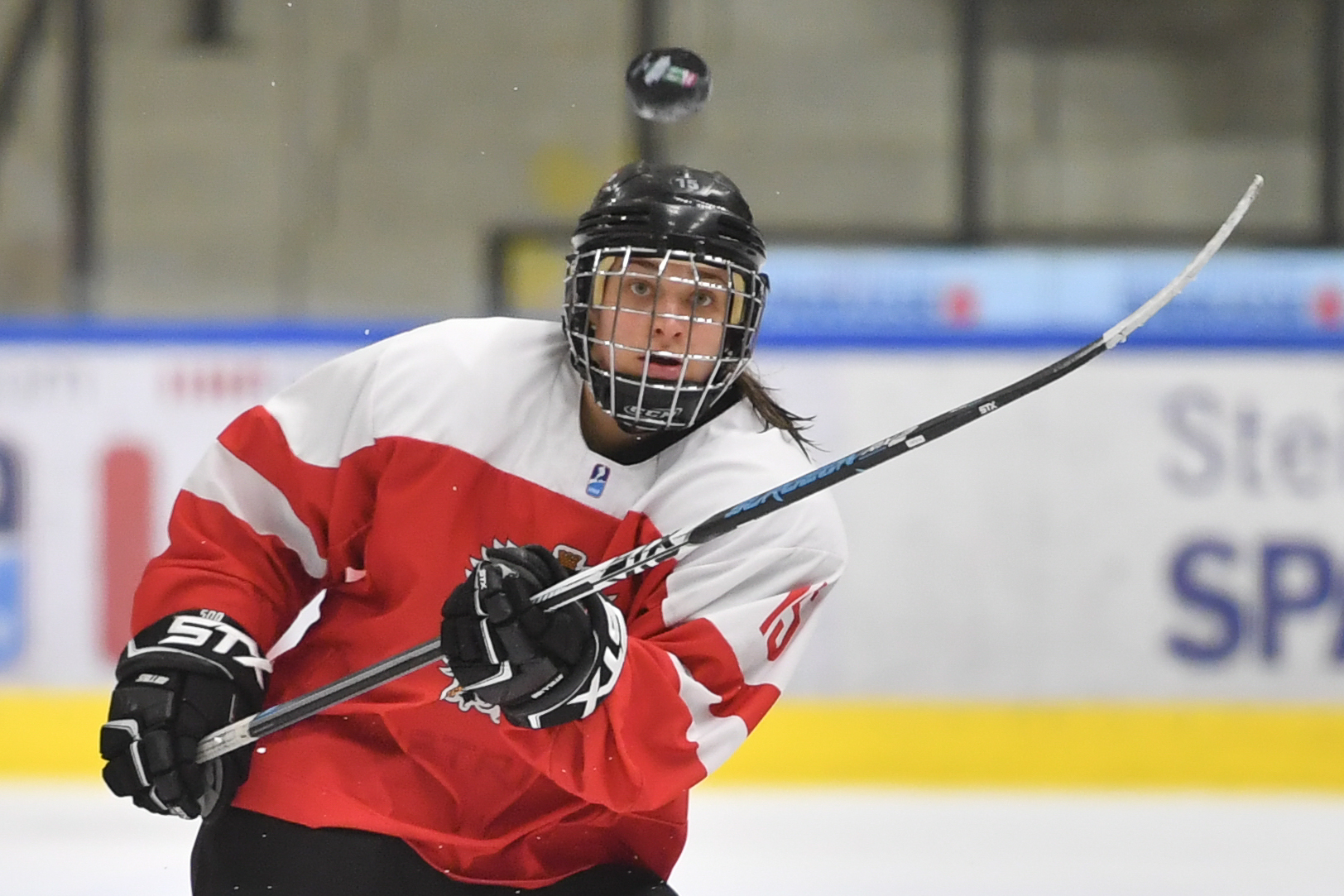
- Weber representing Austria in 2017
- Born: 19 June 1991 (age 35) Innsbruck, Austria
- Height: 5 ft 10 in (178 cm)
- Position: Forward
- Shoots: Left
- PHF team Former teams: Connecticut Whale: Boston Pride; New York Riveters; Boston Blades; Providence Friars; EHV Sabres Wien; Ravens Salzburg; Red Angels Innsbruck
- National team: Austria
- Playing career: 2004–present

Janine Weber (born 19 June 1991) is an Austrian professional ice hockey player and member of the Austrian national team who mostly recently played in the now defunct Premier Hockey Federation (PHF) with the Connecticut Whale. She previously played with the Boston Pride and the New York Riveters of the National Women's Hockey League (NWHL; rebranded as PHF in 2021), the Boston Blades of the Canadian Women's Hockey League (CWHL), and the EHV Sabres Wien and Ravens Salzburg of the Elite Women's Hockey League (EWHL). With the Blades, Weber scored the game-winning goal of the 2015 Clarkson Cup.

== Playing career ==
Weber was born and raised in Innsbruck, the capital city of Tyrol in the Austrian Alps. She began playing ice hockey at 8 years old and developed in the youth ice hockey department of HC Innsbruck, playing on the club's boys' teams until turning 17. She made her senior women's club debut at age 14 with the DEHC Red Angels Innsbruck in the Women's Ice Hockey Bundesliga (DEBL) and the Austrian Championship. With the Red Angels, she won the DEBL Championship in the 2005–06 season.

She played most of the 2006–07 season with EC The Ravens Salzburg in the Elite Women's Hockey League, finishing fourth in team scoring, but also appeared in a small number of DEBL and Austrian Championship games with the Red Angels. The 2007–08 and 2008–09 seasons were played entirely with The Ravens in the EWHL and Austrian Championship.

In the 2009–10 season, she moved to Vienna and joined the EHV Sabres Wien of the EWHL and Austrian Championship. She played with the Sabres for four seasons, winning the Austrian Championship four consecutive times and claiming the EWHL Championship in 2011 and 2012. The 2011–12 season was the most productive of her career – across 18 games played, she topped EWHL statistics charts with 29 goals, 46 points, and a +31 plus-minus.

=== NCAA ===
As a teen, Weber had dreamed of playing college ice hockey in the United States, so when an American teammate from the Sabres put her in touch with the Providence Friars women's ice hockey program, she jumped at the opportunity. With her undergraduate studies already completed in Austria, she was eligible to play one year in the NCAA as a graduate student and joined the Friars for the 2013–14 season. She made her NCAA debut on 4 October 2013 against Union College, and logged her first point in the same game. Weber scored the game-winning overtime goal for Providence in the 19th Annual Mayors Cup, a yearly ice hockey match between the two Providence-based NCAA programs, the Providence Friars and the Brown Bears.

=== CWHL ===
Selected by the Boston Blades in the 2014 CWHL Draft, Weber made her CWHL debut on 15 November 2014, logging her first career goal in a 6–2 win against the Toronto Furies. Most of the season was spent skating on the third line with fellow rookies Corinne Buie (a former Friars teammate) and Jordan Smelker. Scoring the Clarkson Cup-winning goal in 2015, Weber became the first European player to accomplish the feat and the second European player to win the Clarkson Cup, following Katka Mrázová who won with the Blades in 2013. The stick with which she scored the Cup-winning goal was donated to the Hockey Hall of Fame.

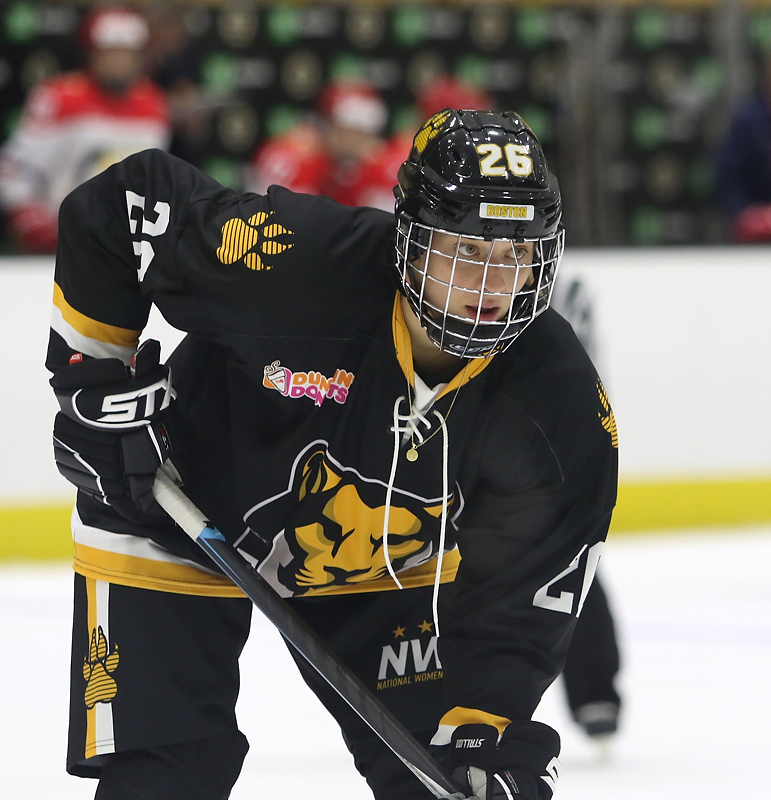
Janine Weber playing for the Boston Pride in 2017

=== NWHL ===
In the spring of 2015, Weber attended the training camp of the Connecticut Whale, part of the newly established National Women's Hockey League. She ultimately signed with the New York Riveters, making her not just the first player in to sign with the club in franchise history, but the first player in the history of the NWHL to be signed to a contract.

Weber was selected to the 1st NWHL All-Star Game, becoming the first European to compete in the All-Star Game. She would score a goal in a 4–0 win on 20 November 2016, against the Connecticut Whale, which was the first shutout in Riveters history.

Following two seasons with the Riveters, Weber signed with the Boston Pride for the 2017–18 season as a free agent.

After sitting out the 2019–20 season Weber signed with the Connecticut Whale in January 2020. She was named an alternate captain in the 2021–22 season.

== International play ==
Weber made her international debut with the Austrian national team at the 2008 IIHF Women's World Championship Division II, contributing an assist to Austria's promotion to Division I.

The following season, she made her international junior debut with the Austrian national under-18 team at the inaugural IIHF U18 Women's World Championship tournament: the 2008 U18 Women's World Championship. She served as team captain and led the team in scoring with 3 goals and 2 assists for 5 points in four games. At the 2013 IIHF Women's World Championship Division I Group A tournament, Weber led all skaters in scoring, notching 4 goals and 7 points.

== Personal life ==
Weber earned her Matura at the Reithmann Gymnasium in her home city of Innsbruck in 2009. She completed undergraduate studies while living in Vienna during 2009 to 2013 and holds a Master of Education from Providence College in Providence, Rhode Island.

In 2022, she began working as development coach with the Warwick, Rhode Island–based junior ice hockey team HC Rhode Island of the Eastern Hockey League (EHL).

== Career stats ==
=== Regular season and playoffs ===
			Regular season					Playoffs
Season	Team	League	GP	G	A	Pts	PIM	GP	G	A	Pts	PIM
2004–05	Red Angels Innsbruck	DEBL	2	3	1	4	0	–	–	–	–	–
2005–06	Red Angels Innsbruck	DEBL	3	5	2	7	2	–	–	–	–	–
2006–07	Ravens Salzburg	EWHL	21	26	14	40	33	–	–	–	–	–
2006–07	Red Angels Innsbruck	DEBL	1	1	2	3	0	–	–	–	–	–
2007–08	Ravens Salzburg	EWHL	19	20	20	40	4	–	–	–	–	–
2008–09	Ravens Salzburg	EWHL	11	8	8	16	6	–	–	–	–	–
2009–10	Sabres Wien	EWHL	14	15	11	26	8	–	–	–	–	–
2010–11	Sabres Wien	EWHL	6	8	1	9	2	–	–	–	–	–
2011–12	Sabres Wien	EWHL	18	29	17	46	2	–	–	–	–	–
2012–13	Sabres Wien	EWHL	21	23	20	43	10	–	–	–	–	–
2013–14	Providence Friars	NCAA	35	6	5	11	22	–	–	–	–	–
2014–15	Boston Blades	CWHL	17	3	4	7	4	3	3	0	3	2
2015–16	New York Riveters	NWHL	18	3	6	9	4	2	0	0	0	0
2016–17	New York Riveters	NWHL	17	10	12	22	4	1	1	0	1	2
2017–18	Boston Pride	NWHL	13	3	4	7	6	1	0	0	0	0
2019–20	Connecticut Whale	NWHL	8	0	4	4	2	2	0	1	1	0
2020–21	Connecticut Whale	NWHL	4	0	0	0	4	–	–	–	–	–
2021–22	Connecticut Whale	PHF	16	5	8	13	6	2	1	1	2	0
DEBL totals			6	9	5	14	2	–	–	–	–	–
EWHL totals			110	129	91	220	65	–	–	–	–	–
PHF totals			76	21	34	55	26	8	2	2	4	2

== Awards and honors ==
- 2011 EWHL All-Star Team
- 2012 EWHL All-Star Team
- NWHL Player of the Week (Awarded 22 February 2017)
