= 2019 IIHF Women's World Championship rosters =

Each team's roster consists of at least 15 skaters (forwards, and defencemen) and 2 goaltenders, and at most 20 skaters and 3 goaltenders. All ten participating nations, through the confirmation of their respective national associations, had to submit a roster by the first IIHF directorate.

== Group A ==
=== Canada ===
The roster was announced on 6 March 2019.

Head Coach: Perry Pearn

| No. | Pos. | Name | Height | Weight | Birthdate | Team |
|---|---|---|---|---|---|---|
| 1 | G | Shannon Szabados | 1.73 m (5 ft 8 in) | 64 kg (141 lb) | 6 August 1986 (aged 32) | (United States) Buffalo Beauts |
| 3 | D | Jocelyne Larocque – A | 1.68 m (5 ft 6 in) | 66 kg (146 lb) | 19 May 1988 (aged 30) | (Canada) Markham Thunder |
| 4 | D | Brigette Lacquette | 1.68 m (5 ft 6 in) | 82 kg (181 lb) | 11 October 1992 (aged 26) | (Canada) Calgary Inferno |
| 6 | F | Rebecca Johnston | 1.75 m (5 ft 9 in) | 67 kg (148 lb) | 24 September 1989 (aged 29) | (Canada) Calgary Inferno |
| 7 | F | Laura Stacey | 1.78 m (5 ft 10 in) | 71 kg (157 lb) | 5 May 1994 (aged 24) | (Canada) Markham Thunder |
| 8 | D | Laura Fortino | 1.63 m (5 ft 4 in) | 62 kg (137 lb) | 30 January 1991 (aged 28) | (Canada) Markham Thunder |
| 11 | F | Jillian Saulnier | 1.65 m (5 ft 5 in) | 66 kg (146 lb) | 7 March 1992 (aged 27) | (Canada) Les Canadiennes |
| 14 | D | Renata Fast | 1.68 m (5 ft 6 in) | 65 kg (143 lb) | 6 October 1994 (aged 24) | (Canada) Toronto Furies |
| 15 | F | Mélodie Daoust | 1.63 m (5 ft 4 in) | 71 kg (157 lb) | 7 January 1992 (aged 27) | (Canada) Les Canadiennes |
| 19 | F | Brianne Jenner – A | 1.75 m (5 ft 9 in) | 71 kg (157 lb) | 4 May 1991 (aged 27) | (Canada) Calgary Inferno |
| 20 | F | Sarah Nurse | 1.75 m (5 ft 9 in) | 67 kg (148 lb) | 4 January 1995 (aged 24) | (Canada) Toronto Furies |
| 23 | D | Erin Ambrose | 1.65 m (5 ft 5 in) | 60 kg (130 lb) | 30 April 1994 (aged 24) | (Canada) Les Canadiennes |
| 24 | F | Natalie Spooner | 1.78 m (5 ft 10 in) | 82 kg (181 lb) | 17 October 1990 (aged 28) | (Canada) Toronto Furies |
| 25 | D | Jaime Bourbonnais | 1.70 m (5 ft 7 in) | 57 kg (126 lb) | 9 September 1998 (aged 20) | (United States) Cornell University |
| 26 | F | Emily Clark | 1.70 m (5 ft 7 in) | 61 kg (134 lb) | 28 November 1995 (aged 23) | (United States) University of Wisconsin |
| 28 | D | Micah Hart | 1.73 m (5 ft 8 in) | 69 kg (152 lb) | 13 January 1997 (aged 22) | (United States) Cornell University |
| 29 | F | Marie-Philip Poulin – C | 1.70 m (5 ft 7 in) | 73 kg (161 lb) | 28 March 1991 (aged 28) | (Canada) Les Canadiennes |
| 31 | G | Geneviève Lacasse | 1.73 m (5 ft 8 in) | 69 kg (152 lb) | 5 May 1989 (aged 29) | (Canada) Les Canadiennes |
| 36 | F | Loren Gabel | 1.63 m (5 ft 4 in) | 64 kg (141 lb) | 24 July 1997 (aged 21) | (United States) Clarkson University |
| 38 | G | Emerance Maschmeyer | 1.68 m (5 ft 6 in) | 64 kg (141 lb) | 5 October 1994 (aged 24) | (Canada) Les Canadiennes |
| 39 | F | Ann-Sophie Bettez | 1.63 m (5 ft 4 in) | 59 kg (130 lb) | 14 October 1987 (aged 31) | (Canada) Les Canadiennes |
| 40 | F | Blayre Turnbull | 1.70 m (5 ft 7 in) | 72 kg (159 lb) | 15 July 1993 (aged 25) | (Canada) Calgary Inferno |
| 47 | F | Jamie Lee Rattray | 1.68 m (5 ft 6 in) | 78 kg (172 lb) | 30 September 1992 (aged 26) | (Canada) Markham Thunder |

=== Finland ===
The roster was announced on 25 March 2019.

Head Coach: Pasi Mustonen

| No. | Pos. | Name | Height | Weight | Birthdate | Team |
|---|---|---|---|---|---|---|
| 1 | G | Eveliina Suonpää | 1.74 m (5 ft 9 in) | 68 kg (150 lb) | 12 April 1995 (aged 23) | (Sweden) Linköping HC |
| 2 | D | Isa Rahunen | 1.64 m (5 ft 5 in) | 67 kg (148 lb) | 16 April 1993 (aged 25) | (Finland) Oulun Kärpät |
| 4 | D | Rosa Lindstedt | 1.87 m (6 ft 2 in) | 80 kg (180 lb) | 24 January 1988 (aged 31) | (Sweden) HV71 |
| 6 | D | Jenni Hiirikoski – C | 1.62 m (5 ft 4 in) | 62 kg (137 lb) | 30 March 1987 (aged 32) | (Sweden) Luleå HF |
| 7 | D | Nelli Laitinen | 1.69 m (5 ft 7 in) | 62 kg (137 lb) | 29 April 2002 (aged 16) | (Finland) Espoo Blues |
| 8 | D | Ella Viitasuo | 1.72 m (5 ft 8 in) | 67 kg (148 lb) | 27 May 1996 (aged 22) | (Finland) Espoo Blues |
| 9 | F | Venla Hovi | 1.69 m (5 ft 7 in) | 67 kg (148 lb) | 28 October 1987 (aged 31) | (Canada) Calgary Inferno |
| 10 | F | Linda Välimäki | 1.66 m (5 ft 5 in) | 69 kg (152 lb) | 31 May 1990 (aged 28) | (Finland) Ilves |
| 11 | F | Annina Rajahuhta | 1.65 m (5 ft 5 in) | 72 kg (159 lb) | 8 March 1989 (aged 30) | (Finland) Espoo Blues |
| 12 | F | Elisa Holopainen | 1.65 m (5 ft 5 in) | 55 kg (121 lb) | 27 May 1996 (aged 22) | (Finland) KalPa |
| 13 | F | Riikka Sallinen – A | 1.63 m (5 ft 4 in) | 60 kg (130 lb) | 12 June 1973 (aged 45) | (Sweden) HV71 |
| 15 | D | Minttu Tuominen | 1.65 m (5 ft 5 in) | 71 kg (157 lb) | 26 January 1990 (aged 29) | (Finland) Espoo Blues |
| 19 | F | Petra Nieminen | 1.69 m (5 ft 7 in) | 64 kg (141 lb) | 4 May 1999 (aged 19) | (Sweden) Luleå HF |
| 22 | F | Emma Nuutinen | 1.76 m (5 ft 9 in) | 73 kg (161 lb) | 7 December 1996 (aged 22) | (United States) Mercyhurst University |
| 23 | F | Sanni Hakala | 1.54 m (5 ft 1 in) | 55 kg (121 lb) | 31 October 1997 (aged 21) | (Sweden) HV71 |
| 24 | F | Noora Tulus | 1.65 m (5 ft 5 in) | 64 kg (141 lb) | 15 August 1995 (aged 23) | (Sweden) Luleå HF |
| 25 | F | Viivi Vainikka | 1.65 m (5 ft 5 in) | 64 kg (141 lb) | 23 December 2001 (aged 17) | (Finland) Team Kuortane |
| 31 | G | Jenna Silvonen | 1.64 m (5 ft 5 in) | 63 kg (139 lb) | 2 January 1999 (aged 20) | (Finland) Espoo Blues |
| 33 | F | Michelle Karvinen – A | 1.67 m (5 ft 6 in) | 69 kg (152 lb) | 27 March 1990 (aged 29) | (Sweden) Luleå HF |
| 41 | G | Noora Räty | 1.65 m (5 ft 5 in) | 65 kg (143 lb) | 29 May 1989 (aged 29) | (China) Shenzhen KRS Vanke Rays |
| 61 | F | Tanja Niskanen | 1.76 m (5 ft 9 in) | 70 kg (150 lb) | 11 September 1992 (aged 26) | (Finland) KalPa |
| 77 | F | Susanna Tapani | 1.77 m (5 ft 10 in) | 65 kg (143 lb) | 2 March 1993 (aged 26) | (Sweden) Linköping HC |
| 88 | D | Ronja Savolainen | 1.76 m (5 ft 9 in) | 72 kg (159 lb) | 29 November 1997 (aged 21) | (Sweden) Luleå HF |

=== Russia ===
A 26-player roster was announced on 21 March 2019. The final roster was revealed on 31 March 2019.

Head Coach: Alexei Chistyakov

| No. | Pos. | Name | Height | Weight | Birthdate | Team |
|---|---|---|---|---|---|---|
| 7 | F | Diana Kanayeva | 1.71 m (5 ft 7 in) | 62 kg (137 lb) | 27 March 1997 (aged 22) | (Russia) HC St. Petersburg |
| 11 | D | Liana Ganeyeva | 1.65 m (5 ft 5 in) | 62 kg (137 lb) | 20 December 1997 (aged 21) | (Russia) SK Gorny |
| 13 | D | Nina Pirogova | 1.73 m (5 ft 8 in) | 68 kg (150 lb) | 26 January 1999 (aged 20) | (Russia) Tornado Moscow |
| 15 | F | Valeria Pavlova – A | 1.78 m (5 ft 10 in) | 80 kg (180 lb) | 15 April 1995 (aged 23) | (Russia) Biryusa Krasnoyarsk |
| 17 | F | Fanuza Kadirova | 1.63 m (5 ft 4 in) | 62 kg (137 lb) | 6 April 1998 (aged 20) | (Russia) SK Gorny |
| 18 | F | Olga Sosina – A | 1.63 m (5 ft 4 in) | 75 kg (165 lb) | 27 July 1992 (aged 26) | (Russia) HC Agidel Ufa |
| 22 | D | Maria Batalova | 1.73 m (5 ft 8 in) | 69 kg (152 lb) | 3 May 1996 (aged 22) | (Russia) HC Agidel Ufa |
| 23 | F | Anna Timofeyeva | 1.71 m (5 ft 7 in) | 77 kg (170 lb) | 30 November 1996 (aged 22) | (Russia) Biryusa Krasnoyarsk |
| 27 | D | Anastasia Chistyakova | 1.73 m (5 ft 8 in) | 80 kg (180 lb) | 11 February 1997 (aged 22) | (Russia) HC St. Petersburg |
| 30 | G | Valeria Merkusheva | 1.68 m (5 ft 6 in) | 66 kg (146 lb) | 30 September 1999 (aged 19) | (Russia) HC St. Petersburg |
| 31 | G | Anna Prugova | 1.74 m (5 ft 9 in) | 65 kg (143 lb) | 3 January 1986 (aged 33) | (Russia) HC Agidel Ufa |
| 33 | D | Daria Teryoshkina | 1.69 m (5 ft 7 in) | 75 kg (165 lb) | 11 January 1998 (aged 21) | (United States) Maine Black Bears |
| 42 | F | Oxana Bratisheva | 1.65 m (5 ft 5 in) | 53 kg (117 lb) | 5 June 2000 (aged 18) | (Russia) SKIF Nizhny Novgorod |
| 59 | F | Yelena Dergachyova | 1.59 m (5 ft 3 in) | 55 kg (121 lb) | 8 November 1995 (aged 23) | (Russia) Tornado Moscow |
| 68 | F | Alevtina Shtaryova | 1.73 m (5 ft 8 in) | 65 kg (143 lb) | 9 February 1997 (aged 22) | (Russia) Tornado Moscow |
| 70 | D | Anna Shibanova – C | 1.63 m (5 ft 4 in) | 63 kg (139 lb) | 10 November 1994 (aged 24) | (Russia) HC Agidel Ufa |
| 72 | D | Anna Savonina | 1.61 m (5 ft 3 in) | 64 kg (141 lb) | 5 December 2001 (aged 17) | (Russia) Tornado Moscow |
| 73 | F | Viktoria Kulishova | 1.71 m (5 ft 7 in) | 58 kg (128 lb) | 12 August 1999 (aged 19) | (Russia) SKIF Nizhny Novgorod |
| 76 | D | Yekaterina Nikolayeva | 1.65 m (5 ft 5 in) | 66 kg (146 lb) | 5 October 1995 (aged 23) | (Russia) HC St. Petersburg |
| 88 | F | Yekaterina Smolina | 1.62 m (5 ft 4 in) | 58 kg (128 lb) | 8 October 1988 (aged 30) | (Russia) HC St. Petersburg |
| 90 | F | Alexandra Vafina | 1.64 m (5 ft 5 in) | 57 kg (126 lb) | 28 July 1990 (aged 28) | (Russia) SKIF Nizhny Novgorod |
| 92 | G | Nadezhda Morozova | 1.70 m (5 ft 7 in) | 88 kg (194 lb) | 29 November 1996 (aged 22) | (Russia) Biryusa Krasnoyarsk |
| 97 | F | Anna Shokhina | 1.69 m (5 ft 7 in) | 68 kg (150 lb) | 23 June 1997 (aged 21) | (Russia) Tornado Moscow |

=== Switzerland ===
The roster was announced on 6 March 2019.

Head Coach: Daniela Diaz

| No. | Pos. | Name | Height | Weight | Birthdate | Team |
|---|---|---|---|---|---|---|
| 1 | G | Janine Alder | 1.65 m (5 ft 5 in) | 58 kg (128 lb) | 5 July 1995 (aged 23) | (United States) St. Cloud State University |
| 3 | F | Sarah Forster | 1.69 m (5 ft 7 in) | 64 kg (141 lb) | 19 March 1993 (aged 26) | (Sweden) Brynäs IF |
| 6 | D | Lara Christen | 1.63 m (5 ft 4 in) | 61 kg (134 lb) | 2 October 2002 (aged 16) | (Switzerland) SC Langenthal U17 |
| 7 | F | Lara Stalder | 1.67 m (5 ft 6 in) | 65 kg (143 lb) | 15 May 1994 (aged 24) | (Sweden) Linköping HC |
| 8 | F | Kaleigh Quennec | 1.72 m (5 ft 8 in) | 79 kg (174 lb) | 15 February 1998 (aged 21) | (Canada) University of Montreal |
| 9 | D | Shannon Sigrist | 1.67 m (5 ft 6 in) | 67 kg (148 lb) | 20 April 1999 (aged 19) | (Switzerland) SC Weinfelden |
| 10 | F | Sabrina Zollinger | 1.65 m (5 ft 5 in) | 65 kg (143 lb) | 27 August 1993 (aged 25) | (Sweden) HV71 |
| 11 | D | Sinja Leemann | 1.66 m (5 ft 5 in) | 59 kg (130 lb) | 19 April 2002 (aged 16) | (Switzerland) SC Rapperswil-Jona U17 |
| 12 | F | Lisa Rüedi | 1.67 m (5 ft 6 in) | 64 kg (141 lb) | 3 November 2000 (aged 18) | (Switzerland) ZSC Lions |
| 14 | F | Evelina Raselli | 1.70 m (5 ft 7 in) | 61 kg (134 lb) | 3 May 1992 (aged 26) | (Switzerland) SC Reinach |
| 16 | D | Nicole Vallario | 1.64 m (5 ft 5 in) | 59 kg (130 lb) | 30 August 2001 (aged 17) | (Switzerland) HC Ladies Lugano |
| 17 | F | Jessica Schlegel | 1.65 m (5 ft 5 in) | 77 kg (170 lb) | 20 August 2000 (aged 18) | (Switzerland) ZSC Lions |
| 18 | F | Stefanie Wetli | 1.73 m (5 ft 8 in) | 63 kg (139 lb) | 4 February 2000 (aged 19) | (Switzerland) EHC Winterthur U17 |
| 20 | G | Andrea Brändli | 1.69 m (5 ft 7 in) | 65 kg (143 lb) | 5 June 1997 (aged 21) | (United States) Ohio State University |
| 21 | F | Rahel Enzler | 1.63 m (5 ft 4 in) | 63 kg (139 lb) | 30 July 2000 (aged 18) | (Switzerland) SC Reinach |
| 22 | D | Livia Altmann – C | 1.66 m (5 ft 5 in) | 65 kg (143 lb) | 13 December 1994 (aged 24) | (United States) Colgate University |
| 23 | D | Nicole Bullo | 1.60 m (5 ft 3 in) | 54 kg (119 lb) | 18 July 1987 (aged 31) | (Switzerland) HC Ladies Lugano |
| 24 | F | Isabel Waidacher – A | 1.62 m (5 ft 4 in) | 55 kg (121 lb) | 25 July 1994 (aged 24) | (Sweden) Djurgårdens IF Hockey |
| 25 | F | Alina Müller | 1.67 m (5 ft 6 in) | 63 kg (139 lb) | 12 March 1998 (aged 21) | (United States) Northeastern University |
| 26 | F | Dominique Rüegg – A | 1.74 m (5 ft 9 in) | 75 kg (165 lb) | 5 February 1996 (aged 23) | (Switzerland) ZSC Lions |
| 29 | G | Saskia Maurer | 1.66 m (5 ft 5 in) | 62 kg (137 lb) | 29 July 2001 (aged 17) | (Switzerland) HC Dragon Thun |
| 87 | F | Noemi Ryhner | 1.65 m (5 ft 5 in) | 59 kg (130 lb) | 24 April 2000 (aged 18) | (Switzerland) EV Zug |
| 88 | F | Phoebe Stänz | 1.64 m (5 ft 5 in) | 59 kg (130 lb) | 7 January 1994 (aged 25) | (Switzerland) HC Ladies Lugano |

=== United States ===
The roster was announced on 1 March 2019.

Head Coach: Bob Corkum

| No. | Pos. | Name | Height | Weight | Birthdate | Team |
|---|---|---|---|---|---|---|
| 2 | D | Lee Stecklein | 1.83 m (6 ft 0 in) | 77 kg (170 lb) | 23 April 1994 (aged 24) | (United States) Minnesota Whitecaps |
| 3 | D | Cayla Barnes | 1.57 m (5 ft 2 in) | 63 kg (139 lb) | 7 January 1999 (aged 20) | (United States) Boston College |
| 5 | D | Megan Keller | 1.80 m (5 ft 11 in) | 75 kg (165 lb) | 1 May 1996 (aged 22) | (United States) Boston College |
| 8 | D | Emily Pfalzer | 1.57 m (5 ft 2 in) | 57 kg (126 lb) | 14 June 1993 (aged 25) | (United States) Buffalo Beauts |
| 9 | D | Megan Bozek | 1.73 m (5 ft 8 in) | 80 kg (180 lb) | 27 March 1991 (aged 28) | (Canada) Markham Thunder |
| 12 | F | Kelly Pannek | 1.73 m (5 ft 8 in) | 75 kg (165 lb) | 29 December 1995 (aged 23) | (United States) University of Minnesota |
| 14 | F | Brianna Decker | 1.63 m (5 ft 4 in) | 67 kg (148 lb) | 13 May 1991 (aged 27) | (Canada) Calgary Inferno |
| 15 | F | Sydney Brodt | 1.68 m (5 ft 6 in) | 64 kg (141 lb) | 3 May 1998 (aged 20) | (United States) University of Minnesota Duluth |
| 16 | F | Hayley Scamurra | 1.73 m (5 ft 8 in) | 73 kg (161 lb) | 14 December 1994 (aged 24) | (United States) Buffalo Beauts |
| 18 | F | Jesse Compher | 1.73 m (5 ft 8 in) | 73 kg (161 lb) | 1 July 1999 (aged 19) | (United States) Boston University |
| 20 | F | Hannah Brandt | 1.68 m (5 ft 6 in) | 68 kg (150 lb) | 27 November 1993 (aged 25) | (United States) Minnesota Whitecaps |
| 21 | F | Hilary Knight – A | 1.80 m (5 ft 11 in) | 78 kg (172 lb) | 12 July 1989 (aged 29) | (Canada) Les Canadiennes |
| 22 | D | Kacey Bellamy – A | 1.70 m (5 ft 7 in) | 66 kg (146 lb) | 22 April 1987 (aged 31) | (Canada) Calgary Inferno |
| 24 | F | Dani Cameranesi | 1.65 m (5 ft 5 in) | 70 kg (150 lb) | 30 June 1995 (aged 23) | (United States) Buffalo Beauts |
| 25 | F | Alexandra Carpenter | 1.70 m (5 ft 7 in) | 70 kg (150 lb) | 13 April 1994 (aged 24) | (China) Shenzhen KRS Vanke Rays |
| 26 | F | Kendall Coyne Schofield – C | 1.57 m (5 ft 2 in) | 57 kg (126 lb) | 25 May 1992 (aged 26) | (United States) Minnesota Whitecaps |
| 27 | F | Annie Pankowski | 1.75 m (5 ft 9 in) | 75 kg (165 lb) | 4 November 1994 (aged 24) | (United States) University of Wisconsin |
| 28 | F | Amanda Kessel | 1.68 m (5 ft 6 in) | 59 kg (130 lb) | 28 August 1991 (aged 27) | (United States) Metropolitan Riveters |
| 31 | G | Emma Polusny | 1.75 m (5 ft 9 in) | 74 kg (163 lb) | 16 March 1999 (aged 20) | (United States) St. Cloud State University |
| 32 | D | Michelle Picard | 1.63 m (5 ft 4 in) | 68 kg (150 lb) | 27 May 1993 (aged 25) | (United States) Metropolitan Riveters |
| 33 | G | Alex Rigsby | 1.70 m (5 ft 7 in) | 70 kg (150 lb) | 3 January 1992 (aged 27) | (Canada) Calgary Inferno |
| 35 | G | Maddie Rooney | 1.65 m (5 ft 5 in) | 66 kg (146 lb) | 7 July 1997 (aged 21) | (United States) University of Minnesota Duluth |
| 39 | F | Melissa Samoskevich | 1.63 m (5 ft 4 in) | 76 kg (168 lb) | 31 March 1997 (aged 22) | (United States) Quinnipiac University |

== Group B ==
=== Czech Republic ===
The roster was announced on 26 March 2019.

Head Coach: Petr Novák

| No. | Pos. | Name | Height | Weight | Birthdate | Team |
|---|---|---|---|---|---|---|
| 1 | G | Kristýna Bláhová | 1.65 m (5 ft 5 in) | 61 kg (134 lb) | 2 October 2000 (aged 18) | (Czech Republic) HC Příbram |
| 2 | D | Aneta Tejralová – A | 1.64 m (5 ft 5 in) | 53 kg (117 lb) | 4 January 1996 (aged 23) | (Russia) HC St. Petersburg |
| 4 | D | Daniela Pejšová | 1.73 m (5 ft 8 in) | 71 kg (157 lb) | 14 August 2002 (aged 16) | (Sweden) Modo Hockey |
| 5 | D | Samantha Kolowratová | 1.70 m (5 ft 7 in) | 71 kg (157 lb) | 12 July 1996 (aged 22) | (United States) University of Vermont |
| 7 | D | Martina Zedníková | 1.70 m (5 ft 7 in) | 71 kg (157 lb) | 28 March 1998 (aged 21) | (Czech Republic) HC Příbram |
| 8 | F | Barbora Patočková | 1.73 m (5 ft 8 in) | 64 kg (141 lb) | 23 September 1998 (aged 20) | (Czech Republic) SK Černošice |
| 9 | F | Alena Mills – C | 1.73 m (5 ft 8 in) | 78 kg (172 lb) | 9 June 1990 (aged 28) | (Russia) HC Agidel Ufa |
| 10 | F | Denisa Křížová – A | 1.65 m (5 ft 5 in) | 68 kg (150 lb) | 3 November 1994 (aged 24) | (United States) Boston Pride |
| 11 | F | Simona Studentová | 1.56 m (5 ft 1 in) | 54 kg (119 lb) | 24 August 1986 (aged 32) | (Switzerland) HC Université Neuchâtel |
| 12 | F | Klára Hymlarová | 1.62 m (5 ft 4 in) | 65 kg (143 lb) | 27 February 1999 (aged 20) | (Canada) Ontario Hockey Academy |
| 13 | F | Martina Mašková | 1.66 m (5 ft 5 in) | 74 kg (163 lb) | 15 February 1998 (aged 21) | (Canada) University of Regina |
| 15 | F | Aneta Lédlová | 1.70 m (5 ft 7 in) | 77 kg (170 lb) | 31 December 1996 (aged 22) | (Sweden) AIK IF |
| 16 | F | Kateřina Mrázová | 1.63 m (5 ft 4 in) | 64 kg (141 lb) | 19 October 1992 (aged 26) | (United States) Connecticut Whale |
| 17 | D | Pavlína Horálková | 1.66 m (5 ft 5 in) | 61 kg (134 lb) | 24 May 1991 (aged 27) | (Russia) Biryusa Krasnoyarsk |
| 18 | F | Michaela Pejzlová | 1.70 m (5 ft 7 in) | 64 kg (141 lb) | 4 June 1997 (aged 21) | (United States) Clarkson University |
| 19 | F | Natálie Mlýnková | 1.61 m (5 ft 3 in) | 63 kg (139 lb) | 24 May 2001 (aged 17) | (Canada) Shelburne Stars |
| 21 | F | Tereza Vanišová | 1.70 m (5 ft 7 in) | 62 kg (137 lb) | 30 January 1996 (aged 23) | (United States) University of Maine |
| 23 | D | Karolína Kosinová | 1.71 m (5 ft 7 in) | 73 kg (161 lb) | 21 May 1998 (aged 20) | (Czech Republic) HC Příbram |
| 26 | F | Vendula Přibylová | 1.71 m (5 ft 7 in) | 76 kg (168 lb) | 23 March 1996 (aged 23) | (United States) University of Maine |
| 27 | D | Anna Zíková | 1.68 m (5 ft 6 in) | 60 kg (130 lb) | 13 May 1998 (aged 20) | (United States) University of Maine |
| 28 | F | Noemi Neubauerová | 1.76 m (5 ft 9 in) | 78 kg (172 lb) | 15 December 1999 (aged 19) | (United States) Colgate University |
| 29 | G | Klára Peslarová | 1.64 m (5 ft 5 in) | 63 kg (139 lb) | 23 November 1996 (aged 22) | (Sweden) Modo Hockey |
| 30 | G | Kateřina Zechovská | 1.65 m (5 ft 5 in) | 78 kg (172 lb) | 4 November 1998 (aged 20) | (Canada) Shelburne Stars |

=== France ===
The roster was announced on 6 March 2019.

Head Coach: Grégory Tarlé

| No. | Pos. | Name | Height | Weight | Birthdate | Team |
|---|---|---|---|---|---|---|
| 1 | G | Caroline Baldin | 1.67 m (5 ft 6 in) | 84 kg (185 lb) | 14 March 1993 (aged 26) | (Switzerland) ZSC Lions |
| 3 | D | Louanne Mermier | 1.74 m (5 ft 9 in) | 78 kg (172 lb) | 1 February 2001 (aged 18) | (France) Megève HC |
| 4 | F | Margot Desvignes | 1.60 m (5 ft 3 in) | 72 kg (159 lb) | 10 June 2000 (aged 18) | (Switzerland) HC Université Neuchâtel |
| 5 | D | Eloïse Jure | 1.63 m (5 ft 4 in) | 60 kg (130 lb) | 5 April 2001 (aged 17) | (France) Brûleurs de Loups |
| 6 | F | Jade Vix | 1.74 m (5 ft 9 in) | 80 kg (180 lb) | 3 May 1997 (aged 21) | (Canada) University of Montreal |
| 7 | F | Emmanuelle Passard | 1.68 m (5 ft 6 in) | 75 kg (165 lb) | 27 January 1992 (aged 27) | (Canada) University of Montreal |
| 8 | F | Lara Escudero | 1.64 m (5 ft 5 in) | 64 kg (141 lb) | 6 June 1993 (aged 25) | (Switzerland) HC Lugano |
| 9 | F | Marion Allemoz – C | 1.69 m (5 ft 7 in) | 75 kg (165 lb) | 4 July 1989 (aged 29) | (Sweden) Modo Hockey |
| 10 | F | Morgane Rihet – A | 1.54 m (5 ft 1 in) | 50 kg (110 lb) | 14 April 1994 (aged 24) | (France) SOC Hockey |
| 11 | D | Léa Villiot | 1.65 m (5 ft 5 in) | 60 kg (130 lb) | 11 February 1997 (aged 22) | (France) Diables Rouges de Briançon |
| 12 | F | Estelle Duvin | 1.71 m (5 ft 7 in) | 70 kg (150 lb) | 1 February 1997 (aged 22) | (Canada) University of Montreal |
| 14 | D | Athéna Locatelli | 1.58 m (5 ft 2 in) | 55 kg (121 lb) | 16 July 1991 (aged 27) | (France) Ours de Villard-de-Lans |
| 15 | F | Betty Jouanny | 1.60 m (5 ft 3 in) | 57 kg (126 lb) | 4 January 1992 (aged 27) | (Sweden) Djurgårdens IF Hockey |
| 16 | F | Clara Rozier | 1.61 m (5 ft 3 in) | 62 kg (137 lb) | 28 August 1997 (aged 21) | (France) Pingouins de Morzine-Avoriaz |
| 17 | F | Chloé Aurard | 1.68 m (5 ft 6 in) | 65 kg (143 lb) | 15 March 1999 (aged 20) | (United States) Northeastern University |
| 19 | F | Lore Baudrit – A | 1.90 m (6 ft 3 in) | 82 kg (181 lb) | 11 October 1991 (aged 27) | (Sweden) IF Björklöven |
| 20 | G | Margaux Mameri | 1.61 m (5 ft 3 in) | 65 kg (143 lb) | 12 April 1997 (aged 21) | (Sweden) IF Björklöven |
| 21 | F | Léa Parment | 1.66 m (5 ft 5 in) | 70 kg (150 lb) | 16 December 1996 (aged 22) | (France) Évry-Viry HC |
| 22 | D | Gwendoline Gendarme | 1.70 m (5 ft 7 in) | 72 kg (159 lb) | 18 March 1991 (aged 28) | (Sweden) Djurgårdens IF Hockey |
| 23 | F | Amandine Cuasnet | 1.63 m (5 ft 4 in) | 64 kg (141 lb) | 24 May 1991 (aged 27) | (France) Corsaires de Dunkerque |
| 24 | D | Raphaëlle Grenier | 1.67 m (5 ft 6 in) | 70 kg (150 lb) | 1 August 1996 (aged 22) | (France) LHC Les Lions |
| 25 | G | Caroline Lambert | 1.65 m (5 ft 5 in) | 69 kg (152 lb) | 1 April 1995 (aged 24) | (Switzerland) SC Weinfelden |
| 26 | D | Alexandra Harrison | 1.72 m (5 ft 8 in) | 71 kg (157 lb) | 29 March 2002 (aged 17) | (France) Chamonix HC |

=== Germany ===
The roster was announced on 29 March 2019.

Head Coach: Christian Künast

| No. | Pos. | Name | Height | Weight | Birthdate | Team |
|---|---|---|---|---|---|---|
| 6 | F | Marie-Kristin Schmid | 1.65 m (5 ft 5 in) | 60 kg (130 lb) | 15 December 1996 (aged 22) | (Germany) ERC Ingolstadt |
| 7 | F | Nina Kamenik | 1.60 m (5 ft 3 in) | 57 kg (126 lb) | 27 April 1985 (aged 33) | (Germany) Eisbären Juniors Berlin |
| 8 | F | Julia Zorn – C | 1.70 m (5 ft 7 in) | 69 kg (152 lb) | 6 February 1990 (aged 29) | (Germany) ESC Planegg |
| 9 | D | Rebecca Graeve | 1.66 m (5 ft 5 in) | 66 kg (146 lb) | 28 April 1993 (aged 25) | (Germany) EC Bergkamen |
| 10 | D | Yvonne Rothemund | 1.80 m (5 ft 11 in) | 79 kg (174 lb) | 23 September 1992 (aged 26) | (Germany) ESC Planegg |
| 11 | F | Nicola Eisenschmid | 1.66 m (5 ft 5 in) | 65 kg (143 lb) | 10 September 1996 (aged 22) | (Germany) ERC Ingolstadt |
| 12 | D | Anna Fiegert – A | 1.74 m (5 ft 9 in) | 73 kg (161 lb) | 3 April 1994 (aged 25) | (United States) Minnesota Blue J's |
| 13 | G | Ivonne Schröder | 1.78 m (5 ft 10 in) | 68 kg (150 lb) | 25 July 1988 (aged 30) | (Germany) Tornado Niesky |
| 14 | D | Carina Strobel | 1.72 m (5 ft 8 in) | 60 kg (130 lb) | 11 September 1997 (aged 21) | (Germany) Memmingen Indians |
| 15 | F | Andrea Lanzl – A | 1.63 m (5 ft 4 in) | 64 kg (141 lb) | 8 October 1987 (aged 31) | (Germany) ERC Ingolstadt |
| 16 | F | Emily Nix | 1.72 m (5 ft 8 in) | 70 kg (150 lb) | 12 January 1998 (aged 21) | (Germany) Crocodiles Hamburg |
| 17 | D | Lena Düsterhöft | 1.77 m (5 ft 10 in) | 70 kg (150 lb) | 26 August 1996 (aged 22) | (United States) Minnesota State University |
| 18 | F | Bernadette Karpf | 1.67 m (5 ft 6 in) | 61 kg (134 lb) | 3 July 1996 (aged 22) | (Germany) ESC Planegg |
| 19 | F | Kerstin Spielberger | 1.68 m (5 ft 6 in) | 61 kg (134 lb) | 14 December 1995 (aged 23) | (Germany) ESC Planegg |
| 20 | D | Daria Gleissner | 1.70 m (5 ft 7 in) | 71 kg (157 lb) | 30 June 1993 (aged 25) | (Germany) Memmingen Indians |
| 21 | D | Tabea Botthof | 1.75 m (5 ft 9 in) | 73 kg (161 lb) | 1 June 2000 (aged 18) | (United States) Yale University |
| 22 | F | Marie Delarbre | 1.74 m (5 ft 9 in) | 70 kg (150 lb) | 22 January 1994 (aged 25) | (Germany) Memmingen Indians |
| 25 | F | Laura Kluge | 1.78 m (5 ft 10 in) | 55 kg (121 lb) | 6 November 1996 (aged 22) | (United States) St. Cloud State University |
| 26 | F | Anne Bartsch | 1.63 m (5 ft 4 in) | 61 kg (134 lb) | 22 September 1995 (aged 23) | (Germany) Eisbären Juniors Berlin |
| 28 | F | Naemi Bär | 1.78 m (5 ft 10 in) | 73 kg (161 lb) | 14 February 2000 (aged 19) | (Germany) Eisbären Juniors Berlin |
| 30 | G | Jennifer Harß | 1.75 m (5 ft 9 in) | 62 kg (137 lb) | 14 July 1987 (aged 31) | (Germany) EHC Königsbrunn |
| 34 | F | Celina Haider | 1.70 m (5 ft 7 in) | 65 kg (143 lb) | 20 July 2000 (aged 18) | (Germany) EHC Klostersee |
| 35 | G | Jule Flötgen | 1.63 m (5 ft 4 in) | 59 kg (130 lb) | 24 December 1991 (aged 27) | (Germany) EC Bergkamen |

=== Japan ===
The roster was announced on 22 March 2019.

Head Coach: Yuji Iizuka

| No. | Pos. | Name | Height | Weight | Birthdate | Team |
|---|---|---|---|---|---|---|
| 1 | G | Nana Fujimoto | 1.64 m (5 ft 5 in) | 56 kg (123 lb) | 3 March 1989 (aged 30) | (Japan) Vortex Sapporo |
| 2 | D | Shiori Koike | 1.59 m (5 ft 3 in) | 52 kg (115 lb) | 21 March 1993 (aged 26) | (Japan) DK Peregrine |
| 3 | D | Aoi Shiga | 1.66 m (5 ft 5 in) | 58 kg (128 lb) | 4 July 1999 (aged 19) | (Japan) Toyota Cygnus |
| 4 | D | Ayaka Toko | 1.60 m (5 ft 3 in) | 58 kg (128 lb) | 22 August 1994 (aged 24) | (Japan) Seibu Rabbits |
| 6 | D | Sena Suzuki | 1.67 m (5 ft 6 in) | 58 kg (128 lb) | 4 August 1991 (aged 27) | (Canada) Toronto Furies |
| 8 | D | Akane Hosoyamada – A | 1.63 m (5 ft 4 in) | 59 kg (130 lb) | 9 March 1992 (aged 27) | (Japan) DK Peregrine |
| 9 | D | Kanami Seki | 1.66 m (5 ft 5 in) | 65 kg (143 lb) | 23 June 2000 (aged 18) | (Japan) Daishin Hockey |
| 10 | F | Haruna Yoneyama | 1.60 m (5 ft 3 in) | 53 kg (117 lb) | 7 November 1991 (aged 27) | (Japan) DK Peregrine |
| 11 | F | Mei Miura | 1.62 m (5 ft 4 in) | 64 kg (141 lb) | 16 November 1998 (aged 20) | (Japan) Toyota Cygnus |
| 12 | F | Chiho Osawa – C | 1.62 m (5 ft 4 in) | 64 kg (141 lb) | 10 February 1992 (aged 27) | (Sweden) Luleå HF |
| 13 | F | Moeko Fujimoto – A | 1.56 m (5 ft 1 in) | 56 kg (123 lb) | 5 August 1992 (aged 26) | (Japan) Toyota Cygnus |
| 14 | F | Haruka Toko | 1.67 m (5 ft 6 in) | 64 kg (141 lb) | 16 March 1997 (aged 22) | (Japan) Seibu Rabbits |
| 15 | F | Rui Ukita | 1.69 m (5 ft 7 in) | 70 kg (150 lb) | 6 June 1996 (aged 22) | (Japan) Daishin Hockey |
| 16 | F | Akane Shiga | 1.64 m (5 ft 5 in) | 61 kg (134 lb) | 3 March 2001 (aged 18) | (Japan) Obihiro Ladies |
| 17 | F | Kaho Suzuki | 1.60 m (5 ft 3 in) | 53 kg (117 lb) | 2 February 2002 (aged 17) | (Japan) Daishin Hockey |
| 18 | F | Suzuka Taka | 1.61 m (5 ft 3 in) | 51 kg (112 lb) | 16 October 1996 (aged 22) | (Japan) DK Perigrine |
| 21 | F | Hanae Kubo | 1.68 m (5 ft 6 in) | 64 kg (141 lb) | 10 December 1982 (aged 36) | (Japan) Seibu Rabbits |
| 25 | F | Hikaru Yamashita | 1.57 m (5 ft 2 in) | 52 kg (115 lb) | 23 September 2000 (aged 18) | (Japan) DK Peregrine |
| 26 | F | Yoshino Enomoto | 1.62 m (5 ft 4 in) | 61 kg (134 lb) | 28 September 1998 (aged 20) | (Japan) Seibu Rabbits |
| 27 | F | Remi Koyama | 1.46 m (4 ft 9 in) | 52 kg (115 lb) | 17 July 2000 (aged 18) | (Japan) Seibu Rabbits |
| 28 | D | Shiori Yamashita | 1.58 m (5 ft 2 in) | 50 kg (110 lb) | 28 April 2002 (aged 16) | (Japan) DK Peregrine |
| 29 | G | Mai Kondo | 1.66 m (5 ft 5 in) | 58 kg (128 lb) | 4 April 1992 (aged 27) | (Japan) Mikage Gretz |
| 30 | G | Akane Konishi | 1.66 m (5 ft 5 in) | 62 kg (137 lb) | 14 August 1995 (aged 23) | (Japan) Seibu Rabbits |

=== Sweden ===
The roster was announced on 19 March 2019.

Head Coach: Ylva Martinsen

| No. | Pos. | Name | Height | Weight | Birthdate | Team |
|---|---|---|---|---|---|---|
| 1 | G | Sara Grahn | 1.70 m (5 ft 7 in) | 67 kg (148 lb) | 25 September 1988 (aged 30) | (Sweden) Luleå HF |
| 3 | D | Mina Waxin | 1.65 m (5 ft 5 in) | 68 kg (150 lb) | 29 April 2001 (aged 17) | (Sweden) Modo Hockey |
| 4 | D | Sofia Engström | 1.63 m (5 ft 4 in) | 63 kg (139 lb) | 3 July 1988 (aged 30) | (Sweden) Leksands IF |
| 5 | D | Johanna Fällman | 1.73 m (5 ft 8 in) | 72 kg (159 lb) | 21 June 1990 (aged 28) | (Sweden) Luleå HF |
| 6 | D | Josefin Holmgren – A | 1.74 m (5 ft 9 in) | 73 kg (161 lb) | 11 April 1993 (aged 25) | (Sweden) Djurgårdens IF Hockey |
| 7 | D | Johanna Olofsson | 1.69 m (5 ft 7 in) | 71 kg (157 lb) | 13 July 1991 (aged 27) | (Sweden) Modo Hockey |
| 9 | D | Jessica Adolfsson | 1.76 m (5 ft 9 in) | 74 kg (163 lb) | 15 July 1998 (aged 20) | (United States) Pennsylvania State University |
| 12 | D | Maja Nylén Persson | 1.62 m (5 ft 4 in) | 63 kg (139 lb) | 20 November 2000 (aged 18) | (Sweden) Leksands IF |
| 14 | F | Sabina Küller | 1.76 m (5 ft 9 in) | 71 kg (157 lb) | 22 September 1994 (aged 24) | (Sweden) AIK IF |
| 15 | F | Lisa Johansson | 1.61 m (5 ft 3 in) | 59 kg (130 lb) | 11 April 1992 (aged 26) | (Sweden) AIK IF |
| 16 | F | Pernilla Winberg | 1.65 m (5 ft 5 in) | 68 kg (150 lb) | 24 February 1989 (aged 30) | (Sweden) Linköpings HC |
| 19 | F | Sara Hjalmarsson | 1.76 m (5 ft 9 in) | 72 kg (159 lb) | 8 February 1998 (aged 21) | (United States) Providence College |
| 20 | F | Fanny Rask | 1.68 m (5 ft 6 in) | 66 kg (146 lb) | 21 May 1991 (aged 27) | (Sweden) HV71 |
| 21 | F | Isabell Palm | 1.78 m (5 ft 10 in) | 69 kg (152 lb) | 13 October 1995 (aged 23) | (Sweden) HV71 |
| 22 | F | Lina Ljungblom | 1.67 m (5 ft 6 in) | 79 kg (174 lb) | 15 October 2001 (aged 17) | (Sweden) HV71 |
| 24 | F | Erika Grahm – A | 1.74 m (5 ft 9 in) | 75 kg (165 lb) | 26 January 1991 (aged 28) | (Sweden) Brynäs IF |
| 25 | F | Melinda Olsson | 1.83 m (6 ft 0 in) | 85 kg (187 lb) | 9 September 1992 (aged 26) | (Sweden) Luleå HF |
| 26 | F | Hanna Olsson | 1.73 m (5 ft 8 in) | 69 kg (152 lb) | 20 January 1999 (aged 20) | (Sweden) Skärgårdens SK |
| 27 | F | Emma Nordin – C | 1.68 m (5 ft 6 in) | 68 kg (150 lb) | 22 March 1991 (aged 28) | (Sweden) Luleå HF |
| 28 | F | Sofie Lundin | 1.64 m (5 ft 5 in) | 63 kg (139 lb) | 15 February 2000 (aged 19) | (Sweden) Djurgårdens IF Hockey |
| 29 | F | Olivia Carlsson | 1.74 m (5 ft 9 in) | 74 kg (163 lb) | 2 March 1995 (aged 24) | (Sweden) Modo Hockey |
| 30 | G | Julia Åberg | 1.78 m (5 ft 10 in) | 79 kg (174 lb) | 12 July 1996 (aged 22) | (Sweden) Leksands IF |
| 35 | G | Lovisa Selander | 1.81 m (5 ft 11 in) | 73 kg (161 lb) | 14 March 1996 (aged 23) | (United States) RPI |
