= 2012–13 EWHL Super Cup =

2012-13 EWHL Super Cup
Tournament details
- Dates: 8 September 2012 – 17 February 2013
- Teams: 6

Final positions
- Champions: (Switzerland) ZSC Lions (1st title)
- Runners-up: (Belarus) HK Pantera Minsk
- Third place: (Germany) ESC Planegg/Würmtal

Tournament statistics
- Games played: 15

The 2012–13 EWHL Super Cup was the second edition of the EWHL Super Cup, a women's ice hockey tournament organized by the Elite Women's Hockey League (EWHL).

Three participants from the 2011–12 EWHL Super Cup - ESC Planegg/Würmtal, the ZSC Lions, and EHV Sabres Wien - returned for the 2012-13 tournament. They were joined by three new teams, ECDC Memmingen, HK Pantera Minsk, and the DEC Salzburg Eagles. HC Slovan Bratislava and OSC Berlin, participants in the 2011-12 tournament, did not return for the 2012-13 competition.

== Tournament ==
=== Results ===
September 8, 2012	(Switzerland) ZSC Lions	4–3 OT (2-1, 1-0, 0-2, 1-0)	(Germany) ECDC Memmingen

September 9, 2012	(Germany) ECDC Memmingen	6–0 (1-0, 4-0, 1-0)	(Austria) DEC Salzburg Eagles

September 15, 2012	(Germany) ESC Planegg/Würmtal	3-2 OT (0-2, 1-0, 1-0, 1-0)	(Germany) ECDC Memmingen

September 16, 2012	(Germany) ESC Planegg/Würmtal	9–0 (3-0, 4-0, 2-0)	(Austria) DEC Salzburg Eagles

September 30, 2012	(Germany) ECDC Memmingen	1–10 (0-3, 1-3, 0-4)	(Austria) EHV Sabres Wien

October 12, 2012	(Austria) EHV Sabres Wien	2–3 (1-1, 1-2, 0-0)	(Switzerland) ZSC Lions

October 13, 2012	(Switzerland) ZSC Lions	4-1 (0-0, 0-1, 4-0)	(Germany) ESC Planegg/Würmtal

October 14, 2012	(Austria) EHV Sabres Wien	3–5 (1-1, 0-2, 2-2)	(Germany) ESC Planegg/Würmtal

October 26, 2012	(Germany) ECDC Memmingen	2–1 SO (0-0, 1-0, 0-1, 0-0, 1-0)	(Belarus) HK Pantera Minsk

October 27, 2012	(Switzerland) ZSC Lions	3–0 (0-0, 3-0, 0-0)	(Belarus) HK Pantera Minsk

October 28, 2012	(Austria) DEC Salzburg Eagles	0-6 (0-2, 0-1, 0-3)	(Switzerland) ZSC Lions

October 29, 2012	(Germany) ESC Planegg	2–4 (0-0, 1-1, 1-3)	(Belarus) HK Pantera Minsk

January 20, 2013	(Belarus) HK Pantera Minsk	6–1 (2-0, 1-1, 3-0)	(Austria) EHV Sabres Wien

February 3, 2013	(Austria) DEC Salzburg Eagles	1–9 (1-3, 0-2, 0-3)	(Austria) EHV Sabres Wien

February 17, 2013	(Belarus) HK Pantera Minsk	7–1 (2-0, 4-1, 1-0)	(Austria) DEC Salzburg Eagles

=== Final table ===
Pos	Team	Pld	W	OTW	OTL	L	GF	GA	GD	Pts
1	(Switzerland) ZSC Lions	5	4	1	0	0	20	6	+14	14
2	(Belarus) HK Pantera Minsk	5	3	0	1	1	18	9	+9	10
3	(Germany) ESC Planegg/Würmtal	5	2	1	0	2	20	13	+7	8
4	(Germany) ECDC Memmingen	5	1	1	2	1	14	18	−4	7
5	(Austria) EHV Sabres Wien	5	2	0	0	3	25	16	+9	6
6	(Austria) DEC Salzburg Eagles	5	0	0	0	5	2	37	−35	0
