= 2011–12 EWHL Super Cup =

2011-12 EWHL Super Cup
Tournament details
- Dates: 3 September 2011 – 29 February 2012
- Teams: 5

Final positions
- Champions: (Germany) ESC Planegg/Würmtal (1st title)
- Runner-up: (Switzerland) ZSC Lions
- Third place: (Slovakia) HC Slovan Bratislava

Tournament statistics
- Games played: 10

The 2011–12 EWHL Super Cup was the first edition of the EWHL Super Cup, a women's ice hockey tournament organized by the Elite Women's Hockey League (EWHL).

The top two teams from the previous season in the Elite Women's Hockey League, the German women's ice hockey Bundesliga, and the Switzerland women's ice hockey league were eligible to participate in the EWHL Super Cup. The HC Lugano Ladies, the second place team in the Swiss league, declined to participate in the tournament

== Tournament ==
=== Results ===
September 3, 2011	(Switzerland) ZSC Lions	2–4 (0-2, 2-1, 0-1)	(Germany) ESC Planegg/Würmtal	Adelboden

September 18, 2011	(Switzerland) ZSC Lions	7–2 (3-1, 2-0, 2-1)	(Austria) EHV Sabres Wien	Reinach

September 18, 2011	(Germany) OSC Berlin	0-8 (0-1, 0-1, 0-6)	(Germany) ESC Planegg/Würmtal	Berlin

October 16, 2011	(Germany) ESC Planegg/Würmtal	8–3 (2-2, 3-0, 3-1)	(Slovakia) HC Slovan Bratislava	Grafing

October 29, 2011	(Germany) OSC Berlin	1–6 (0-1, 0-2, 1-3)	(Switzerland) ZSC Lions	Berlin

February 28, 2012^{1}	(Germany) ESC Planegg/Würmtal	5–2 (3-0, 1-1, 1-1)	(Austria) EHV Sabres Wien

November 26, 2011	(Switzerland) ZSC Lions	6-2 (2-0, 2-1, 2-1)	(Slovakia) HC Slovan Bratislava	Dornbirn

December 10, 2011	(Austria) EHV Sabres Wien	7–2 (2-0, 1-1, 4-1)	(Germany) OSC Berlin

December 11, 2011	(Slovakia) HC Slovan Bratislava	4–2 (2-2, 0-0, 2-0)	(Germany) OSC Berlin

February 29, 2012	(Slovakia) HC Slovan Bratislava	6–3 (0-3, 5-0, 1-0)	(Austria) EHV Sabres Wien

^{1}The game was originally scheduled for November 20, 2011, but was cancelled due to the failure of the ice machine.

=== Final table ===
Pos	Team	Pld	W	OTW	OTL	L	GF	GA	GD	Pts
1	(Germany) ESC Planegg/Würmtal	4	4	0	0	0	25	7	+18	12
2	(Switzerland) ZSC Lions	4	3	0	0	1	21	9	+12	9
3	(Slovakia) HC Slovan Bratislava	4	2	0	0	2	15	19	−4	3
4	(Austria) EHV Sabres Vienna	4	1	0	0	3	14	20	−6	3
5	(Germany) OSC Berlin	4	0	0	0	4	5	25	−20	0
