= List of indoor arenas in Austria =

The following is a list of indoor arenas in Austria with a capacity of at least 1,000 spectators. Most of the arenas in this list are for multiple uses, including popular individual sports like karate, judo, boxing as well as team sports like ice hockey, curling, and volleyball. Some arenas also host many concerts and world tours.

== Currently in use ==
Location	Arena	Date built	Capacity	Image
Dornbirn	Messestadion	2002	4,270	
Feldkirch	Vorarlberghalle	1977	5,200	
Graz	Merkur Eisstadion	1963	4,126	
Graz	Schwarzl Freizeit Zentrum		5,000	
Graz	Stadthalle	2002	11,030	
Innsbruck	Olympiahalle	1963	12,000	
Innsbruck	Tiroler Wasserkraft Arena	2005	3,000	
Kapfenberg	Sportzentrum Kapfenberg		4,600	
Klagenfurt	Stadthalle	1959	4,945	
Linz	Linz AG Eisarena	1986	4,863	
Linz	TipsArena Linz	1974	6,000	
Salzburg	Eisarena Salzburg	1960	3,200	
Salzburg	Salzburgarena	2003	6,400	
Vienna	Albert Schultz Eishalle	1995	7,022	
Vienna	Ferry-Dusika-Hallenstadion	1976	7,700	
Vienna	Wiener Stadthalle	1958	16,152	
Villach	Stadthalle	1969	4,500	
Wels	Bosch-Halle		9,060	
Wiener Neustadt	Arena Nova	1994	5,000	

== Proposed ==
Arena	Capacity	Opening	Location
Wien Holding Arena	20,000	TBD	Vienna

== See also ==
- List of football stadiums in Austria
- List of indoor arenas by capacity
- Lists of stadiums
