= 2011–12 Elite Women's Hockey League =

The 2011–12 EWHL season was the eighth season of the Elite Women's Hockey League, a multi-national women's ice hockey league. Six teams participated in the league, and the EHV Sabres of Austria won the championship for the second time in a row and third time overall.

== Regular season ==
Pl.	Team	Country	GP	W	OTW	OTL	L	Goals	Pts
1.	EHV Sabres	(Austria)	20	16	1	0	3	103:51	47
2.	HC Slovan Bratislava	(Slovakia)	20	14	2	0	6	81:40	40
3.	HK Pantera Minsk	(Belarus)	20	10	0	2	10	57:63	32
4.	EHC Vienna Flyers	(Austria)	20	7	0	3	10	49:68	24
5.	Netherlands	(Netherlands)	20	6	1	0	13	40:76	20
6.	DEC Salzburg Eagles	(Austria)	20	5	1	0	15	40:72	14

== Top scorers ==
Player	Team	GP	G	A	Pts	PIM
Janine Weber	EHV Sabres	18	29	17	46	2
Mariève Provost	EHC Vienna Flyers	19	23	11	34	34
Victoria Hummel	EHV Sabres	18	13	19	32	20
Esther Kantor	EHV Sabres	18	12	15	27	20
Petra Jurčová	Slovan Bratislava	16	19	4	23	6
Savine Wielenga	Netherlands	19	13	8	21	20
Janka Čulíková	Slovan Bratislava	14	12	6	18	8
Ieva Petersone	Pantera Minsk	20	11	8	19	38
Kristine Labrie	EHC Vienna Flyers	19	11	7	18	22
Mieneke de Jong	Netherlands	19	11	5	16	78
