= Kiira Dosdall =

American ice hockey player

Kiira Dosdall-Arena
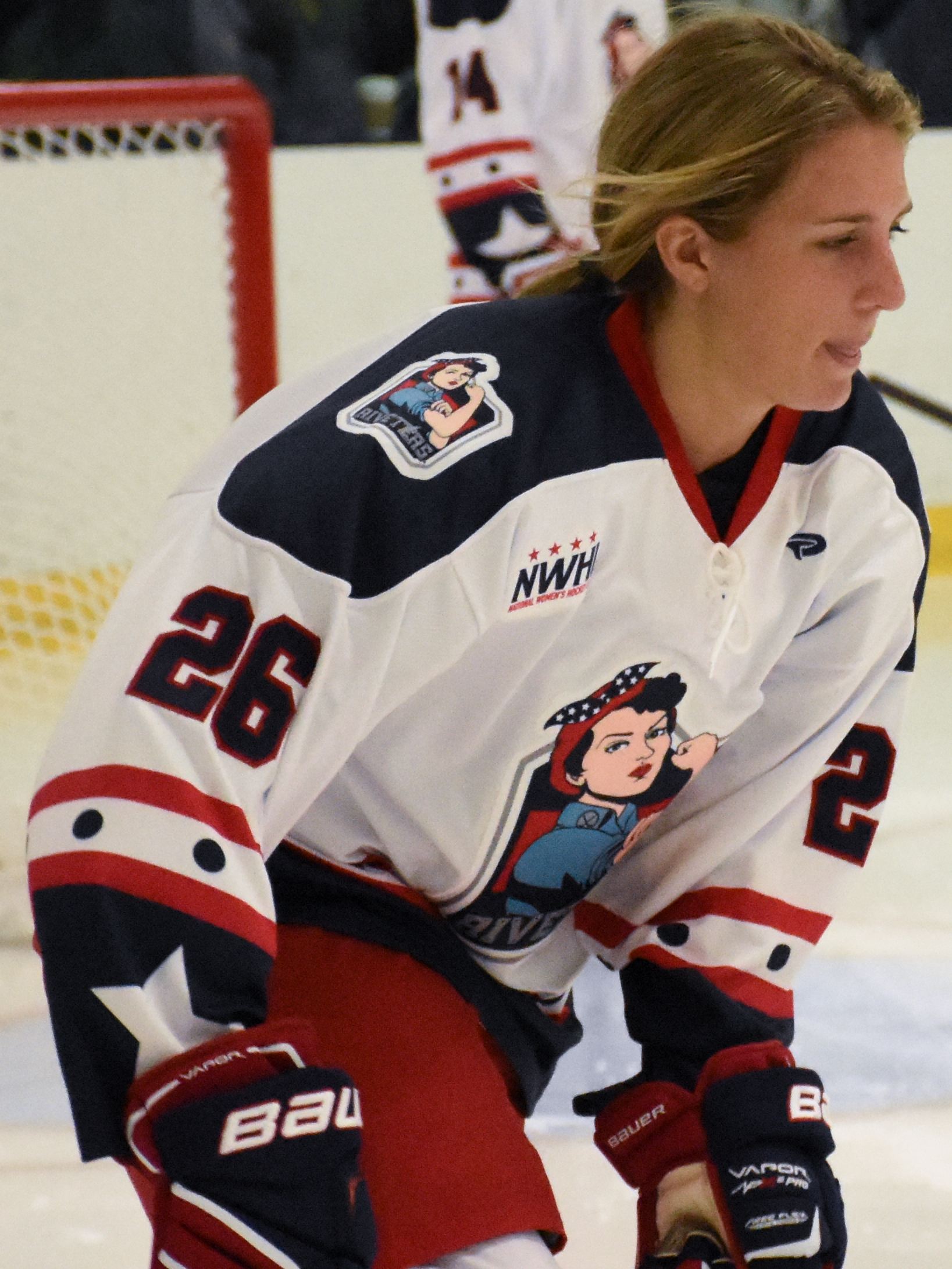
- Dosdall-Arena with the New York Riveters in 2015
- Born: July 31, 1987 (age 39) Stamford, Connecticut, United States
- Height: 5 ft 8 in (173 cm)
- Weight: 141 lb (64 kg; 10 st 1 lb)
- Position: Defense
- Shoots: Right
- PHF team Former teams: Metropolitan Riveters; Boston Blades; EHV Sabres Vienna; Colgate Raiders
- National team: United States
- Playing career: 2005–present

Kiira Dosdall-Arena (born July 31, 1987) is an American professional ice hockey player, who currently plays with the Metropolitan Riveters of the Premier Hockey Federation (PHF). She has previously won two Elite Women's Hockey League championships and one Isobel Cup and is the seventh longest-tenured player in PHF history, one of the few still active from the league's inaugural season.

== Playing career ==
=== Early career ===
From 2005 to 2009, Dosdall played for the Colgate Raiders ice hockey team, serving as the team's captain in her senior season. Across 134 NCAA games with Colgate, she scored 63 points. She was nominated for the 2008-09 Patty Kazmaier Award.

=== Professional ===
After graduating, Dosdall moved to Austria to join the EHV Sabres Vienna of the Austrian Women's Ice Hockey Bundesliga (DEBL) and the Elite Women's Hockey League (EWHL), where she would play until 2013. As an import player, she received a stipend from the team to cover her housing costs. Dosdall was the first player to be named to the EWHL All-Star Team four years in a row.

In 2013, she returned to North America to sign with the Boston Blades of the CWHL. In her debut CWHL season, she failed to pick up a point in 11 regular season games, before notching one assist in four playoff games. After the team lost in the Clarkson Cup finals against the Toronto Furies, she announced her retirement from hockey.

Dosdall came out of retirement to join the New York Riveters for the NWHL's inaugural season in 2015–16. She scored 7 points in 18 games in her debut NWHL season.

In August 2016, the Riveters announced that Dosdall and team captain Ashley Johnston had each signed a one-year contract worth $13,500 to continue with the franchise in the 2016/17 season. In 2017, Dosdall became an alternate captain for the New York Riveters after the retirement of Morgan Fritz-Ward.

She was named to the 2020 NWHL All-Star game as a member of Team Dempsey.

== Personal life ==
Dosdall is a graduate of Colgate University in New York, USA. In addition to her playing career, Dosdall has worked as a project specialist for Schoology.

In February 2025, Dosdall released the course "8 Keys to Boost LinkedIn Learning Engagement for L&D Professionals" on LinkedIn Learning.
