= 2007–08 Elite Women's Hockey League =

4th ice hockey season of the Elite Women's Hockey League

- League: EWHL
- Sport: Ice hockey
- Number of games: 20
- Number of teams: 11
- League champions: HC Slavia Praha (1)
- Runners-up: Ravens Salzburg
- Top scorer: (Canada) Kristen Hagg (Salzburg)

EWHL seasons
- ← 2006–07 2008–09 →

The 2007–08 Elite Women's Hockey League season was the fourth season of the Elite Women's Hockey League (EWHL), a multi-national women's ice hockey league. HC Slavia Praha of the Czech Republic won the league title for the first time.

== Final standings ==
Pl.	Team	GP	W	OTW	OTL	L	GF:GA	Pts
1.	(Czech Republic) HC Slavia Praha	20	17	3	0	0	123:23	57
2.	(Austria) Ravens Salzburg	20	15	0	2	3	115:30	47
3.	(Austria) EHV Sabres	20	11	4	1	4	88:47	42
4.	(Italy) HC Eagles Bolzano	20	12	1	1	6	78:38	39
5.	(Slovakia) HC Slovan Bratislava	20	11	2	2	5	98:47	39
6.	(Slovenia) HK Terme Maribor	20	12	0	1	7	97:50	37
7.	(Italy) Agordo Hockey	20	8	0	3	9	85:86	27
8.	(Austria) EHC Vienna Flyers	20	5	2	0	13	41:100	19
9.	(Hungary) Ferencváros Budapest Stars	20	3	0	1	16	33:91	10
10.	(Croatia) KHL Grič Zagreb	20	1	2	0	17	34:156	7
11.	(Slovenia) HK Triglav Kranj	20	1	0	3	16	21:145	6

== Player statistics ==
=== Scoring leaders ===
The following players led the league in total points scored at the conclusion of the season.

	Nat.	Player	Team	GP	G	A	Pts
1	(Canada)	Kristen Hagg	Ravens Salzburg	19	28	36	64
2	(Slovenia)	Jasmina Rošar	HK Terme Maribor	18	20	25	45
3	(Austria)	Esther Kantor	EHV Sabres	19	28	12	40
4	(Austria)	Janine Weber	Ravens Salzburg	19	20	20	40
5	(Italy)	Eleonora Dalprà	Agordo Hockey	18	18	17	35
6	(Canada)	Jacklyn Friesen	HC Slavia Praha	20	21	13	34
7	(Canada)	Kathleen Dowdall	HC Eagles Bolzano	19	25	8	33
8	(Slovenia)	Ina Prezelj	HK Terme Maribor	19	20	13	33
9	(Czech Republic)	Eva Holešová	HC Slavia Praha	17	15	17	32
10	(Czech Republic)	Tereza Šťastná	HC Slavia Praha	20	16	13	29
