= ESC Planegg-Würmtal =

Ice hockey club in Planegg, Germany

ESC Planegg-Würmtal Planegg Penguins
- City: Planegg, Germany
- League: DFEL, 1994–2024; EWHL, 2008–2011
- Founded: 6 April 1990
- Colours: Blue, red and white
- Head coach: Michael Lehmann (2023–24)
- Captain: Monika Pink (2023–24)
- Website: Official website

Championships
- German Championship: 8 (2008, 2011, 2012, 2013, 2014, 2015, 2017, 2021)
- DEB Cup: 4 (2005, 2010, 2012, 2015)
- EWHL Championship: 1 (2010)

ESC Planegg-Würmtal, nicknamed the Planegg Penguins, is an ice hockey club based in Planegg, a town in the Würmtal (lit. 'Würm valley') near Munich, Germany. The club was founded in 1990 and its representative women's team played in the German Women's Ice Hockey League (DFEL) from 1994 until 2024, at which time it voluntarily withdrew from the league.

ESC Planegg won the German Championship in women's ice hockey eight times, three more wins than any other team in DFEL history, and also won the German Cup (German: DEB-Pokal [der Frauen]) four times.

The club participated in the supranational Elite Women's Hockey League (EWHL) during 2008 to 2011, winning the EWHL Championship in 2009–10, and participated in the EWHL Super Cup from 2011–12, winning the Cup in 2011–12 and 2013–14.

== History ==
The ESC Planegg was founded on 6 April 1990 and initially took part in the game operations of the Bavarian state league (German: Landesliga Bayern). In 1994, the team became Bavarian Champions in a partnership with ERSC Ottobrunn and were promoted to the DFEL, in which the club remained for the following thirty years. After promotion, however, the partnership was dissolved and ESC Planegg continued playing alone, although the club's secondary team played together with ERSC Ottobrunn in both the 1994–95 and 1998–99 seasons. In the 1996–97 and 1997–98 seasons, the second team played as SG Planegg/München to enable players from Munich to participate.

After the team failed to qualify for the intermediate round in the 2004–05 DFEL season, they took part in the relegation round. By finishing in one of the bottom two spots of the Southern Group/Conference (German: Gruppe Süd) in the preliminary round, they were automatically selected to play in the 2005 German Cup (German: DEB-Pokal der Frauen 2005) and their placement in the DFEL relegation round qualified the team for the German Cup final round. At the finals of the German Cup, ESC Planegg lost to the Lady Panthers of Grefrather EC 2001 in a penalty shoot-out, however, the game was entered into the record books as 5-0 in favor of Planegg because the GEC Lady Panthers did not have the mandatory minimum number of players and were disqualified as a result. Under these unusual circumstances, ESC Planegg was awarded their first German Cup victory.

In the 2005–06 season, the team managed to qualify for the intermediate round, where they claimed fourth seed in the final tournament. ESC Planegg lost in the final against OSC Berlin and became runners-up. In the 2006–07 season, the German Champions were not determined in a cup tournament for the first time. In the end, the ESC Planegg reached second place in the table and were runner-up again. At the newly introduced DEB Cup tournament, the ESC Planegg lost to EC Bergkamener Bären in the penalty shoot-out in the final and were again able to claim second place.

In the 2007–08 season, the club won the German Championship for the first time without losing a point, with a 13-point lead over second-placed OSC Berlin. In the DEB Cup, however, the Penguins narrowly lost to OSC 3:4 in the preliminary round and won the match for third place 7–0 against EC Bergkamen. The ESC Planegg started the 2008–09 season as German Champions in the IIHF European Women Champions Cup, but did not make it beyond the preliminary round. The team also took part in the Elite Women's Hockey League for the first time, which was held parallel to the Bundesliga, and finished third behind HC Slavia Praha and OSC Berlin.

In the 2009–10 season, ESC Planegg took part in the EWHL alongside the Bundesliga, this time as the only German representative, and won it to become the first German team to claim the EWHL Championship after defeating the Ravens Salzburg in the final.

ESC Planegg finished the 2019–20 Bundesliga regular season in first place and reached the play-off final against ECDC Memmingen after beating the Eisbären Juniors Berlin in the semifinals. After the first final game on 7 March 2020 (ECDC Memmingen 2–4 ESC Planegg), the German Ice Hockey Federation (DEB) stopped further game operations in all leagues on 11 March 2020 in response to the COVID-19 pandemic.

In the 2020–21 season, the ESC Planegg qualified for the DFEL Final Four tournament, where they defeated ECDC Memmingen 3-2 in the semifinals and Eisbären Juniors Berlin 4-1 in the final to win the club's eighth German Championship in women's ice hockey. The EWHL Supercup with 12 teams from Europe and Kazakhstan was not played to the end due to the COVID-19 pandemic.

=== Home venues ===
There are no artificial ice rinks in Planegg and the team was obligated to use a number of training and playing venues around the region for home games. Previous venues include the Eissporthalle Grafing in Grafing and the Eisstadion Bad Tölz in Bad Tölz. During the 2022–23 season, the team played at the Eisstadion Miesbach in Miesbach, which they shared with the TEV Miesbach of the men's Eishockey-Bayernliga.

The absence of a home arena ultimately led ESC Planegg-Würmtal to voluntarily withdraw from the DFEL after the 2023–24 season, as the club's board concluded that the club could not remain competitive in a sustainable way without a dedicated home stadium and the amenities one would provide. Club president Kevin Wüst explained, "We are… guests at our so-called home games" in addition to citing "ever greater challenges every year," including the dependence on many third parties, the substantial monetary and labor costs related to securing venues and local sponsorships, and difficulty retaining players, volunteers, and fans among the constant changes.

== Team honours ==
=== German Championship ===
- (gold) DFEL Champions (8): 2007–08, 2010–11, 2011–12, 2012–13, 2013–14, 2014–15, 2016–17, 2020–21
- (silver) Runners-up (7): 2005–06, 2006–07, 2008–09, 2009–10, 2015–16, 2017–18, 2018–19
- (bronze) Third Place: (3): 1998–99, 2001–02, 2002–03

=== German Cup ===
- DEB Cup Champions (4): 2005, 2010, 2012, 2015
- (silver) Runners-up (6): 2007, 2011, 2013, 2014, 2016, 2017
- (bronze) Third Place: (3): 2008, 2009, 2018

=== EWHL Championship ===
- (gold) Elite Women’s Hockey League Champions (1): 2009–10
- (bronze) Third Place (2): 2008–09, 2010–11

=== EWHL Super Cup ===
- EWHL Super Cup Champions (2): 2011–12, 2013
- (silver) Runners-up (2): 2014–15, 2019
- (bronze) Third Place: (4): 2012–13, 2015–16, 2017–18, 2018–19
