= 2005–06 Elite Women's Hockey League =

The 2005–06 Elite Women's Hockey League season was the second season of the Elite Women's Hockey League, a multi-national women's ice hockey league. HC Slovan Bratislava of Slovakia won the league title.

== First round ==
=== Northeast Division ===
| Pl. | | GP | W | OTW | OTL | L | GF–GA | Pts |
| 1. | (Slovakia) HC Slovan Bratislava | 10 | 8 | 1 | 0 | 1 | 105:9 | 18 |
| 2. | (Slovenia) HK Terme Maribor | 10 | 8 | 0 | 2 | 0 | 83:10 | 18 |
| 3. | (Hungary) Ferencváros Stars Budapest | 10 | 5 | 1 | 0 | 4 | 19:43 | 12 |
| 4. | (Hungary) UTE Marilyn Budapest | 10 | 2 | 3 | 1 | 4 | 22:43 | 11 |
| 5. | (Austria) EHC Vienna Flyers | 10 | 1 | 0 | 1 | 8 | 14:76 | 3 |
| 6. | (Austria) EHV Sabres | 10 | 1 | 0 | 1 | 8 | 10:72 | 3 |

=== Southwest Division ===
| Pl. | | GP | W | OTW | OTL | L | GF–GA | Pts |
| 1. | (Italy) HC Eagles Bozen | 8 | 8 | 0 | 0 | 0 | 85:9 | 16 |
| 2. | (Italy) Agordo Hockey | 8 | 5 | 1 | 0 | 2 | 39:27 | 12 |
| 3. | (Austria) EC Ravens Salzburg | 8 | 3 | 0 | 1 | 4 | 15:29 | 7 |
| 4. | (Austria) DEC Dragons Klagenfurt | 8 | 1 | 1 | 0 | 6 | 19:62 | 4 |
| 5. | (Slovenia) HK Gorenjska | 8 | 1 | 0 | 1 | 6 | 15:46 | 3 |

== 9th-11th place ==
| Pl. | | GP | W | OTW | OTL | L | GF–GA | Pts |
| 9. | (Austria) EHC Vienna Flyers | 4 | 3 | 0 | 1 | 0 | 14:7 | 7 |
| 10. | (Austria) EHV Sabres | 4 | 2 | 0 | 0 | 2 | 8:9 | 4 |
| 11. | (Slovenia) HK Gorenjska | 4 | 0 | 1 | 0 | 3 | 3:9 | 2 |

== Playoffs ==
Quarterfinals
SW1 | (Italy) HC Eagles Bozen | 2
NE4 | (Hungary) UTE Marilyn Budapest | 0
NE1 | (Slovakia) HC Slovan Bratislava | 1*
SW3 | (Austria) EC Ravens Salzburg | 1
SW2 | (Italy) Agordo Hockey | 2
NE3 | (Hungary) Ferencváros Stars Budapest | 0
NE2 | (Slovenia) HK Terme Maribor | 2
SW4 | (Austria) DEC Dragons Klagenfurt | 0

Semifinals
SW1 | (Italy) HC Eagles Bozen | 1
NE1 | (Slovakia) HC Slovan Bratislava | 1*
SW2 | (Italy) Agordo Hockey | 1
NE2 | (Slovenia) HK Terme Maribor | 1*

Final
NE1 | (Slovakia) HC Slovan Bratislava | 2
NE2 | (Slovenia) HK Terme Maribor | 0

=== 3rd place ===
- HC Eagles Bozen - Agordo Hockey 2:0

=== 5th-8th place ===
==== Qualification ====
- EC Ravens Salzburg - UTE Marilyn Budapest 2:0
- Ferencvaros Stars Budapest - DEC Dragons Klagenfurt 2:0

==== 5th place ====
- EC Ravens Salzburg - Ferencvaros Stars Budapest 2:0

==== 7th place ====
- DEC Dragons Klagenfurt - UTE Marilyn Budapest 2:0
