= 2008–09 Elite Women's Hockey League =

5th ice hockey season of the Elite Women's Hockey League

- League: EWHL
- Sport: Ice hockey
- Number of games: 14
- Number of teams: 8
- League champions: HC Slavia Praha (2)
- Runners-up: OSC Berlin
- Top scorer: (Slovenia) Pia Pren (Maribor)

EWHL seasons
- ← 2007–08 2009–10 →

The 2008–09 Elite Women's Hockey League season was the fifth season of the Elite Women's Hockey League (EWHL), a multi-national women's ice hockey league. HC Slavia Praha of the Czech Republic won the league title for the second consecutive season before announcing its withdrawal from following year's competition for financial reasons.

== Final standings ==
| Pl. | Team | GP | W | OTW | OTL | L | GF:GA | Pts |
|---|---|---|---|---|---|---|---|---|
| 1. | (Czech Republic) HC Slavia Praha | 14 | 11 | 0 | 0 | 3 | 84:27 | 33 |
| 2. | (Germany) OSC Berlin | 14 | 10 | 0 | 0 | 4 | 65:32 | 30 |
| 3. | (Germany) ESC Planegg/Würmtal | 14 | 8 | 1 | 1 | 4 | 66:34 | 27 |
| 4. | (Austria) EC Ravens Salzburg | 14 | 7 | 2 | 1 | 4 | 63:49 | 26 |
| 5. | (Slovenia) HDK Maribor | 14 | 7 | 0 | 1 | 6 | 51:54 | 22 |
| 6. | (Slovakia) HC Slovan Bratislava | 14 | 5 | 1 | 1 | 7 | 53:46 | 18 |
| 7. | (Austria) SG Sabres/Flyers United Wien | 14 | 4 | 0 | 0 | 10 | 43:52 | 12 |
| 8. | (Croatia) KHL Grič Zagreb | 14 | 0 | 0 | 0 | 14 | 6:137 | 0 |
| 9. | (Italy) Agordo Hockey | Withdrew | | | | | | |
