= 2004 Elite Women's Hockey League =

The 2004 Elite Women's Hockey League season was the first season of the Elite Women's Hockey League, a multi-national women's ice hockey league. The EHV Sabres of Austria won the league title.

== Final standings ==
Pl.		GP	W	OTW	OTL	L	GF–GA	Pts
1.	(Austria) EHV Sabres	14	11	0	1	2	83:38	23
2.	(Slovenia) HK Terme Maribor	14	11	0	0	3	92:37	22
3.	(Italy) Agordo Hockey	14	10	0	0	4	75:43	20
4.	(Italy) HC Eagles Bozen	14	9	0	0	5	73:43	18
5.	(Austria) EC Ravens Salzburg	14	5	1	1	7	48:57	13
6.	(Hungary) UTE Marilyn Budapest	14	2	1	1	10	23:52	7
7.	(Austria) DEC Dragons Klagenfurt	14	3	0	0	11	29:104	6
8.	(Austria) EHC Vienna Flyers	14	2	1	0	11	26:75	6
