= Naemi Bär =

German ice hockey player (born 2000)

- Born: 14 February 2000 (age 26)
- Height: 1.78 m (5 ft 10 in)
- Weight: 73 kg (161 lb; 11 st 7 lb)
- Position: Forward
- Shoots: Left
- DFEL team Former teams: Kölner Haie Damen; EDT Cologne Brownies; EC Bergkamener Bären; Kölner Haie
- National team: Germany
- Playing career: 2015–present

Naemi Liel Bär (born 14 February 2000) is a German ice hockey player for the Kölner Haie and the German national team.

She represented Germany at the 2019 IIHF Women's World Championship.
