= Julia Seitz =

German ice hockey player (born 1994)

- Born: 14 February 1994 (age 32)
- Height: 1.74 m (5 ft 9 in)
- Weight: 67 kg (148 lb; 10 st 8 lb)
- Position: Forward
- Shoots: Left
- DFEL team: ECDC Memmingen
- National team: Germany

Julia Seitz (born 14 February 1994) is a German ice hockey player for ECDC Memmingen and the German national team. She participated at the 2015 IIHF Women's World Championship.
