= Eisarena Salzburg =

Sports arena in Salzburg, Austria

Coordinates: 47.797731°N 13.059888°E

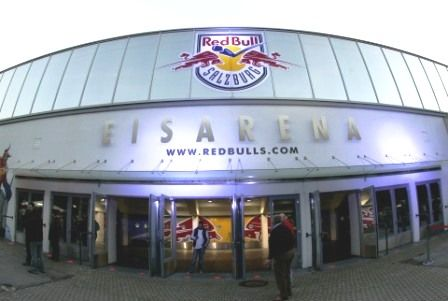
- Interactive map of Eisarena Salzburg
- Location: Hermann-Bahr-Promenade 2, 5020 Salzburg
- Capacity: 3,400

Construction
- Opened: 1960

Tenants
- EC Red Bull Salzburg (EBEL); Red Bull Hockey Juniors (AUT-2); EC Oilers Salzburg (AUT-3); DEC Salzburg Eagles (DEBL)

Eisarena Salzburg is an indoor sports arena, located in Salzburg, Austria. The arena was built in 1960 and has a capacity of 3,400 people.

It is the home arena for a number of ice hockey teams, including EC Red Bull Salzburg ice hockey team of the Austrian Hockey League, Red Bull Hockey Juniors of the Alps Hockey League, EC Oilers Salzburg of the Oberliga, and the Ravens Salzburg of the Dameneishockey Bundesliga (DEBL).
