= Wien Holding Arena =

Planned venue in Vienna, Austria

- Interactive map of Wien Holding Arena
- Location: Neu Marx, Vienna, Austria
- Coordinates: 48.189062°N 16.407343°E
- Capacity: 20,000
- Type: Multipurpose arena
- Surface: Concrete; Parquet; Ice; PVC flooring

Construction
- Opened: 2030 (planned)

The Wien Holding-Arena (WH Arena) is a planned multi-purpose hall in Vienna, Austria. The name Wien Holding Arena is the working title for the future event hall.

== History ==
The multi-purpose event hall is planned to offer approximately 20,000 seats. The architectural competition was launched in January 2020. This will be followed by the planning application and the necessary permitting processes. The new hall is intended to replace the Stadthalle as Vienna's largest event venue. A concept for the future use of the Stadthalle, focusing on recreational sports and cultural events, is to be developed.

== Criticism ==
=== Transport and environment ===
The planned capacity of the hall is expected to lead to a significant increase in traffic volume in the district. Local residents and environmental groups have expressed concerns regarding noise and emissions pollution, as well as the lack of traffic management plans. Furthermore, the planned sealing of the area is viewed critically, especially with regard to urban ecological impacts and the loss of biodiverse structures.

In addition to infrastructural issues, the cultural focus of the project is also being questioned. Critics fear a prioritization of large-scale commercial events at the expense of local cultural initiatives.

== See also ==
- List of indoor arenas in Austria
