= Tara Schmitz =

German ice hockey player (born 1998)

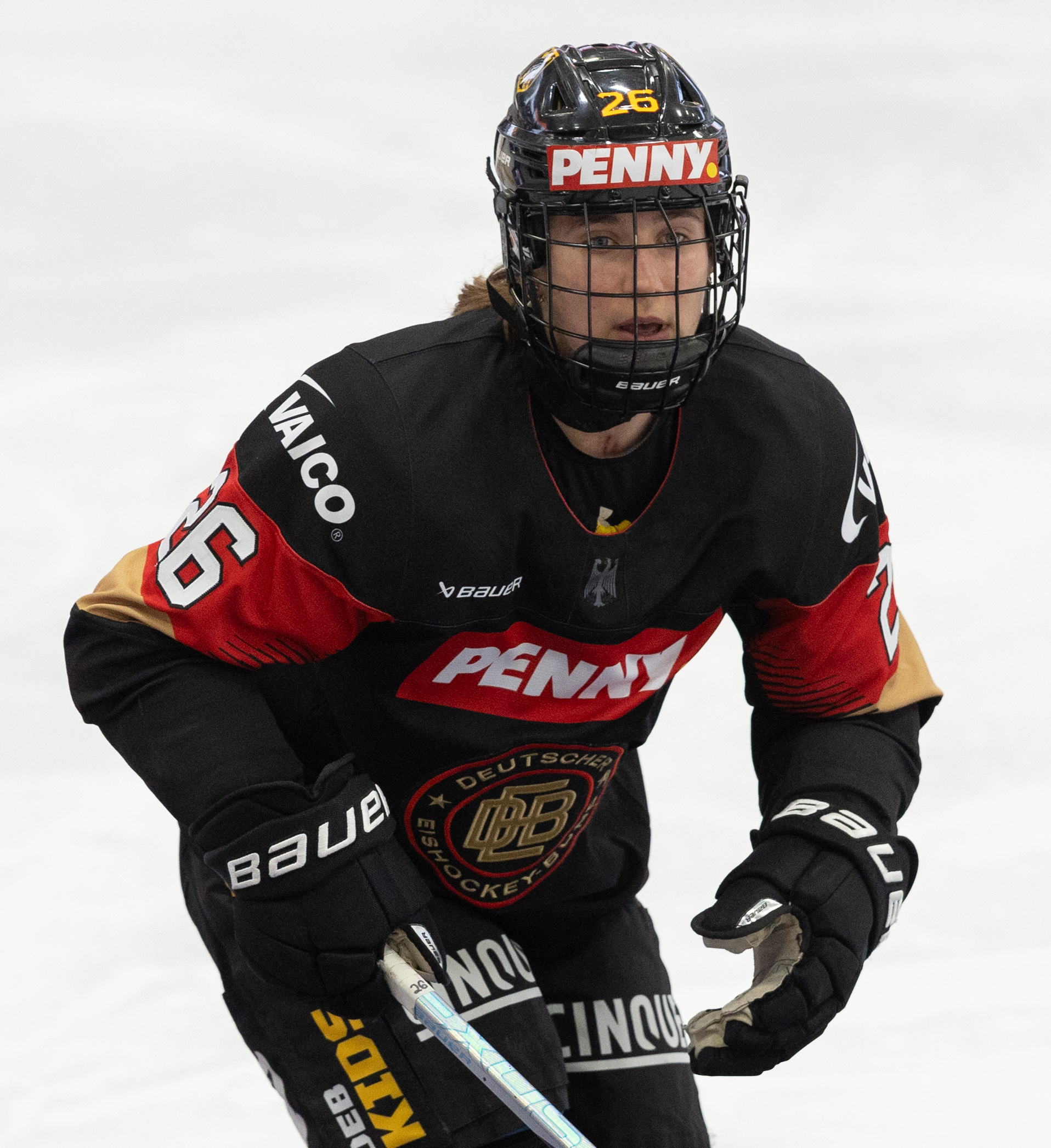
- Schmitz in 2026
- Born: 16 March 1998 (age 28) Düsseldorf, Germany
- Height: 1.65 m (5 ft 5 in)
- Weight: 61 kg (134 lb; 9 st 8 lb)
- Position: Defense
- Shoots: Left
- DFEL team: Mad Dogs Mannheim
- National team: Germany

Tara Schmitz (born 16 March 1998) is a German ice hockey player. She is a member of the Germany women's national ice hockey team that participated in women's ice hockey tournament at the 2026 Winter Olympics. During the 2024–25 season, she was named team captain of Mad Dogs Mannheim.

== Playing career ==
=== International ===
With Germany making their first appearance in women's ice hockey at the Olympics since 2014, the 5 February 2026 match versus Sweden meant that every member of the German roster were making their Olympic debut. Schmitz, wearing number 26, logged 0:47 of ice time in a 4–1 loss to Sweden.
