= European Women's Hockey League =

Multi-national ice hockey league

- Most recent season or competition: 2026–27 EWHL season
- Formerly: Elite Women's Hockey League, 2005–2019
- Sport: Ice hockey
- Founded: 2004; 22 years ago
- Founder: International Ice Hockey Federation
- First season: 2004–05
- Director: Hungarian Ice Hockey Federation
- President: Martin Kogler
- No. of teams: 8
- Countries: Austria (5 teams); Hungary (2 teams); Italy (1 team)
- Headquarters: Göstingerstraße 111; Graz, Austria
- Most recent champion: (Austria) Sabres St. Pölten (2025–26)
- Most titles: (Austria) Sabres St. Pölten (7)
- Sponsor: Tippmix
- International cup: EWHL Super Cup
- Website: Official website

The European Women's Hockey League, abbreviated EWHL, is an international ice hockey league in Central Europe. Created as the Elite Women's Hockey League in 2004 by the International Ice Hockey Federation (IIHF), the EWHL comprises eight clubs and is played in parallel to national championships.

== History ==
The EWHL was created in 2004 on the same principle as the men's ice hockey Interliga. For its first season, the EWHL featured teams from Austria, Hungary, Italy and Slovenia. Teams from additional countries joined the league during the following seasons, including HC Slovan Bratislava from Slovakia in 2005, KHL Grič Zagreb from Croatia in 2006, and HC Slavia Praha from the Czech Republic in 2007. In the 2008–09 season, the Italian and Hungarian teams gave way to two clubs from Germany, OSC Berlin and ESC Planegg. During the 2010–11 and 2011–12 seasons, the Netherlands national team participated in the EWHL.

Before the 2019–20 season, the Elite Women's Hockey League was renamed, becoming the European Women's Hockey League to reflect its unique position within European women's ice hockey. Also, the Polish women's national team joined the league in 2019, playing as the Silesia Brackens and later under the name Silesian Metropolis Katowice. The Hungarian team KMH Budapest rejoined the league, and MAC Budapest was added.

The EWHL is mostly played in a championship format with home and away matches, with the exception of the 2005–06 season where the teams were distributed in two regional divisions followed by qualifying rounds. For the 2010–11 season, the regular season was followed by a play-off between the four teams at the top of the league table.

Though they joined the league in the 2015–16 season, Kazakh team Aisulu Almaty has played only two EWHL games from their home arena, Baluan Sholak Sports Palace in Almaty, due to the significant travel distance. The 2019–20 season provided the first opportunity for Aisulu to play EWHL matches in front of a home crowd, when they hosted the EHV Sabres for a two game series during 19–20 October 2019.

Since the 2019–20 season, the Hungarian Ice Hockey Federation has overseen the league. The league president is Martin Kogler.

In March 2023, a group of eighteen players founded the European Women's Hockey League Players' Association (EWHLPA). The organization's driving purpose is to address players' concerns and advocate for changes on players' behalf, while also playing an active role in the development of the league.

== Teams ==
=== 2026–27 season ===
Team name	Location	Home venue	Head coach
Budapest JA	(Hungary) Budapest	Tüskesátor	Zoltán Fodor
EVB Eagles Südtirol	(Italy) Bolzano	Sparkasse Arena	Stefano Daprà
Graz99ers Huskies	(Austria) Graz	Merkur Eisstadion	Uche Udeh
KSV Highlanders	(Austria) Neuberg an der Mürz	Stadthalle Kapfenberg (Kapfenberg)	Philipp Holper
Lakers Kärnten	(Austria) Ferlach	HTC Eishalle Ferlach	Günther Ropatsch
MAC Budapest	(Hungary) Budapest	Mátyásföldi Jégcsarnok	Botond Bedő
Sabres St. Pölten	(Austria) Sankt Pölten	Sportzentrum NÖ	Fritz Schröder
VSV Lady Hawks	(Austria) Villach	Villacher Stadthalle	David Picka

Source: ÖEHV

=== Former teams ===
Austria

- DEC Dragons Klagenfurt
- DEC Salzburg Eagles
- SG Sabres/Flyers United
- WE-V Flyers

Belarus

- HK Pantera Minsk

Croatia

- KHL Grič Zagreb

Czechia

- HC Slavia Praha

Denmark

- Hvidovre IK

Germany

- ESC Planegg-Würmtal
- OSC Berlin

Hungary

- Budapest Stars
- Hokiklub Budapest
- MAC Marilyn Budapest

Italy

- HC Agordo
- HC Eagles Bolzano

Kazakhstan

- Aisulu Almaty

Netherlands

- Netherlands women's national team

Poland

- Metropolia Silesia

Slovakia

- HC Slovan Bratislava
- HK PSRŽ Bratislava
- HC Spišská Nová Ves
- MHK Martin
- ŽHK Poprad (Popradské Líšky)

Slovenia

- HDK Maribor
- HK Gorenjska
- HK Olimpija Ljubljana
- HK Terme Maribor
- HK Triglav Kranj

== Champions ==
#	Years	(gold) Gold	(silver) Silver	(bronze) Bronze	No. of teams
1	2004	(Austria) EHV Sabres	(Slovenia) HK Terme Maribor	(Italy) HC Agordo	8
2	2005–06	(Slovakia) HC Slovan Bratislava	(Slovenia) HK Terme Maribor	(Italy) HC Eagles Bolzano	11
3	2006–07	(Slovakia) HC Slovan Bratislava	(Austria) The Ravens Salzburg	(Slovenia) HK Terme Maribor	12
4	2007–08	(Czech Republic) Slavia Praha	(Austria) The Ravens Salzburg	(Austria) EHV Sabres	11
5	2008–09	(Czech Republic) Slavia Praha	(Germany) OSC Berlin	(Germany) ESC Planegg	8
6	2009–10	(Germany) ESC Planegg	(Austria) The Ravens Salzburg	(Austria) EHV Sabres	6
7	2010–11	(Austria) EHV Sabres	(Slovakia) Slovan Bratislava	(Germany) ESC Planegg	8
8	2011–12	(Austria) EHV Sabres	(Slovakia) Slovan Bratislava	(Belarus) HK Pantera Minsk	6
9	2012–13	(Belarus) HK Pantera Minsk	(Austria) EHV Sabres	(Austria) Salzburg Eagles	6
10	2013–14	(Italy) EV Bozen Eagles	(Austria) Neuberg Highlanders	(Austria) EHV Sabres	7
11	2014–15	(Austria) EHV Sabres	(Italy) EV Bozen Eagles	(Austria) Salzburg Eagles	6
12	2015–16	(Austria) EHV Sabres	(Austria) Salzburg Eagles	(Kazakhstan) Aisulu Almaty	7
13	2016–17	(Italy) EV Bozen Eagles	(Austria) DEC Salzburg Eagles	(Slovakia) HC ŠKP Bratislava	8
14	2017–18	(Austria) EHV Sabres	(Italy) EV Bozen Eagles	(Hungary) KMH Budapest	8
15	2018–19	(Hungary) KMH Budapest	(Austria) EHV Sabres	(Italy) EVB Eagles Südtirol	9
16	2019–20	(Hungary) KMH Budapest	(Hungary) MAC Budapest	(Kazakhstan) Aisulu Almaty	10
17	2020–21	(Hungary) KMH Budapest	(Austria) EHV Sabres	(Slovakia) HC ŠKP Bratislava	9
18	2021–22	(Hungary) KMH Budapest	(Kazakhstan) Aisulu Almaty	(Austria) EHV Sabres	11
19	2022–23	(Hungary) Hokiklub Budapest	(Hungary) MAC Budapest	(Slovakia) HC ŠKP Bratislava	10
20	2023–24	(Slovakia) HC ŠKP Bratislava	(Hungary) Hokiklub Budapest	(Hungary) MAC Budapest	12
21	2024–25	(Kazakhstan) Aisulu Almaty	(Austria) Sabres St. Pölten	(Slovakia) HK PSRŽ Bratislava	11
22	2025–26	(Austria) Sabres St. Pölten	(Kazakhstan) Aisulu Almaty	(Hungary) MAC Budapest	12

Sources: European Women's Hockey League

=== All-time medal count ===
==== Clubs ====
		Club	(gold) Gold	(silver) Silver	(bronze) Bronze	Total
1	(Austria)	SKN Sabres St. Pölten (Note: Includes record as EHV Sabres)	7	4	4	15
2	(Slovakia)	ŠKP Bratislava (Note: Includes record as Slovan Bratislava)	3	2	3	8
3	(Hungary)	Hokiklub Budapest (Note: Includes record as KMH Budapest)	5	1	1	7
4	(Italy)	EVB Eagles Südtirol (Note: Includes record as EV Bozen Eagles)	2	2	1	5
5	(Czech Republic)	Slavia Praha	2	0	0	2
6	(Kazakhstan)	Aisulu Almaty	1	2	2	5
7	(Germany)	ESC Planegg	1	0	2	3
8	(Belarus)	HK Pantera Minsk	1	0	1	2
9	(Austria)	DEC Salzburg Eagles (Note: Includes record as Ravens Salzburg/The Ravens Salzburg)	0	5	2	7
10	(Hungary)	MAC Budapest	0	2	2	5
11	(Slovenia)	HK Terme Maribor	0	2	1	3
12	(Germany)	OSC Berlin	0	1	0	1
12	(Austria)	Neuburg Highlanders	0	1	0	1
13	(Italy)	HC Eagles Bolzano	0	0	1	1
13	(Italy)	HC Agordo	0	0	1	1
13	(Slovakia)	HK PSRŽ Bratislava	0	0	1	1

==== Nations ====
Rank	Nation	Gold	Silver	Bronze	Total
1	Austria	7	10	6	23
2	Hungary	5	3	4	12
3	Slovakia	3	2	4	9
4	Italy	2	2	3	7
5	Czech Republic	2	0	0	2
6	Kazakhstan	1	2	2	5
7	Germany	1	1	2	4
8	Belarus	1	0	1	2
9	Slovenia	0	2	1	3
Totals (9 entries)		22	22	23	67

== See also ==
- EWHL Super Cup
- IIHF European Women's Champions Cup
- Austria women's ice hockey Bundesliga
- German women's ice hockey Bundesliga
