= 2010–11 Elite Women's Hockey League =

International hockey league

The 2010–11 Elite Women's Hockey League season was the seventh season of the Elite Women's Hockey League, a multi-national women's ice hockey league. The EHV Sabres of Austria won the league title for the second time.

== Regular season ==
Pos	Team	Pld	W	OTW	OTL	L	GF	GA	GD	Pts	Qualification
1	(Austria) EHV Sabres	14	13	0	0	1	101	26	+75	39	Playoffs
2	(Slovenia) HC Slovan Bratislava	14	11	0	1	2	73	28	+45	34	Playoffs
3	(Germany) ESC Planegg/Würmtal	13	8	1	1	3	63	30	+33	27	Playoffs
4	(Slovakia) MHK Martin	13	7	0	0	6	38	53	−15	21	Playoffs
5	(Austria) DEC Salzburg Eagles	14	6	0	0	8	41	58	−17	18	
6	Netherlands	14	3	3	0	8	35	50	−15	15	
7	(Slovenia) HDK Maribor	14	2	0	0	12	25	83	−58	6	
8	(Austria) EHC Vienna Flyers	14	1	0	2	11	23	71	−48	5	

Source: Hockeyarchive

== Playoffs ==
=== Bracket ===
Semi-finals
26 February
1 (Austria) EHV Sabres	9
4 (Slovakia) MHK Martin	1
26 February
2 (Slovakia) Slovan Bratislava	4
3 (Germany) Planegg	1

Gold medal game
27 February
1 (Austria) EHV Sabres	2
2 (Slovakia) Slovan Bratislava	1
Bronze medal game
27 February
3 (Slovakia) MHK Martin	7
4 (Germany) Planegg	0

=== Semifinals ===
26 February 2011	EHV Sabres (Austria)	9–1 (3–0, 3–0, 3–1)	(Slovakia) MHK Martin	Amstetten

26 February 2011	HC Slovan Bratislava (Slovakia)	4–1 (1–0, 1–0, 2–1)	(Germany) ESC Planegg/Würmtal	Amstetten

=== Third place game ===
27 February 2011	ESC Planegg/Würmtal (Germany)	7–0 (1–0, 3–0, 3–0)	(Slovakia) MHK Martin	Amstetten

=== Final ===
27 February 2011	EHV Sabres (Austria)	2–1 (0–1, 1–0, 1–0)	(Slovakia) HC Slovan Bratislava	Amstetten

== Statistics ==
=== Scoring leaders ===
List shows the top ten skaters sorted by points, then goals.

Player	Club	GP	G	A	Pts
(Canada) Samantha Hunt	(Austria) EHV Sabres	16	41	27	68
(Austria) Victoria Hummel	(Austria) EHV Sabres	16	13	25	38
(United States) Kiira Dosdall	(Austria) EHV Sabres	16	13	21	34
(Austria) Esther Kantor	(Austria) EHV Sabres	16	10	20	30
(United States) Evan Minnick	(Germany) ESC Planegg/Würmtal	15	11	14	25

GP = Games played; G = Goals; A = Assists; Pts = Points; Source: hockeyarchives
