= Schwarzl Freizeit Zentrum =

Indoor arena in Premstätten, Austria

Coordinates: 46.9783492°N 15.426693°E

Schwarzl Freizeit Zentrum is an indoor arena in Premstätten, Austria. It currently holds 5,000 spectators and is hosts indoor sporting events such as tennis and basketball. It hosted the 1994 Davis Cup tennis match between Austria and Germany.

Colombian Superstar, Shakira, brought her The Sun Comes Out World Tour to the venue on June 11, 2011.

== See also ==
- List of indoor arenas in Austria
