= 2012–13 Elite Women's Hockey League =

The 2012–13 EWHL season was the ninth season of the Elite Women's Hockey League, a multi-national women's ice hockey league. Six teams participated in the league, and HK Pantera Minsk of Belarus won the championship for the first time.

== Regular season ==
| Pl. | Team | Country | GP | W | OTW | OTL | L | Goals | Pts |
| 1. | HK Pantera Minsk | (Belarus) | 20 | 16 | 2 | 0 | 2 | 103:47 | 52 |
| 2. | EHV Sabres Vienna | (Austria) | 20 | 17 | 0 | 0 | 3 | 130:38 | 51 |
| 3. | DEC Salzburg Eagles | (Austria) | 20 | 9 | 1 | 1 | 9 | 71:78 | 30 |
| 4. | EV Bozen Eagles | (Italy) | 20 | 9 | 0 | 2 | 9 | 68:65 | 29 |
| 5. | KMH Budapest | (Hungary) | 20 | 4 | 0 | 0 | 16 | 31:90 | 12 |
| 6. | EHC Vienna Flyers | (Austria) | 20 | 2 | 0 | 0 | 18 | 32:117 | 6 |

== Playoffs ==
The top four teams from the regular season qualified for the playoffs.

=== Semifinals ===
- HK Pantera Minsk - EV Bozen Eagles 6:1 (0:1, 3:0, 3:0)
- EHV Sabres Vienna - DEC Salzburg Eagles 8:1 (3:0, 3:0, 2:1)

=== 3rd place game ===
- DEC Salzburg Eagles - EV Bozen Eagles 2:1 (2:0, 0:1, 0:0)

=== Final ===
- HK Pantera Minsk - EHV Sabres Vienna 6:1 (2:0, 4:0, 0:1)

== Top scorers ==
| Player | Team | GP | G | A | Pts | PIM |
|---|---|---|---|---|---|---|
| Esther Kantor | EHV Sabres Vienna | 20 | 29 | 34 | 63 | 26 |
| Jessica Jones | HK Pantera Minsk | 19 | 28 | 25 | 53 | 18 |
| Janine Weber | EHV Sabres Vienna | 21 | 23 | 20 | 43 | 10 |
| Anna Meixner | EHV Sabres Vienna | 16 | 22 | 8 | 30 | 10 |
| Maria Herichová | EHC Vienna Flyers | 17 | 19 | 1 | 20 | 8 |
| Becky Conroy | DEC Salzburg Eagles | 20 | 18 | 17 | 35 | 28 |
| Martina Veličková | HK Pantera Minsk | 15 | 17 | 22 | 39 | 8 |
| Jocelyn Kratchmer | DEC Salzburg Eagles | 21 | 17 | 14 | 31 | 28 |
| Kelly Nash | EHV Sabres Vienna | 9 | 16 | 19 | 35 | 12 |
| Kathryn Walker | HK Pantera Minsk | 19 | 15 | 15 | 30 | 8 |
