= Alexandra Harrison =

French ice hockey player

- Born: 29 March 2002 (age 22)
- Height: 1.72 m (5 ft 8 in)
- Weight: 71 kg (157 lb; 11 st 3 lb)
- Position: Defence
- Shoots: Left
- CFHF team Former teams: Chamonix HC; Hockey Club 74
- National team: France
- Playing career: 2017–present

Alexandra Harrison (born 29 March 2002) is a French ice hockey player for Chamonix HC and the French national team.

She represented France at the 2019 IIHF Women's World Championship.
