= EWHL Euro Cup =

Annual ice hockey club tournament

- Current season, competition or edition: 2025–26 EWHL Euro Cup
- Sport: Ice hockey
- Founded: 2011
- No. of teams: 11
- Most recent champion: (Hungary) HK Budapest (2025–26)
- Most titles: (Hungary) HK Budapest (5)
- Website: EWHL.hockey

The EWHL Euro Cup (formerly EWHL Super Cup) is an ice hockey tournament for women's club teams organized by the Hungarian Ice Hockey Federation (HIHF/MJSZ) and the International Ice Hockey Federation (IIHF). It was founded by the IIHF in 2011 in an effort to provided opportunity for clubs to compete and compare themselves against teams from other European leagues. In 2024 the cup was renamed EWHL Euro Cup.

== 2025–26 participating teams ==
- (Kazakhstan) Aisulu Almaty
- (Germany) Eisbären Juniors Berlin
- (Slovakia) HK PSRŽ Bratislava
- (Hungary) Budapest Jégkorong Akadémia
- (Hungary) Hokiklub Budapest
- (Hungary) MAC Budapest
- (Germany) ERC Ingolstadt
- (Austria) Lakers Kärnten
- (Germany) ECDC Memmingen
- (Austria) Sabres St. Pölten
- (Norway) Stavanger Oilers

== Champions ==
Year	Champion	2nd place	3rd place
2011–12	(Germany) ESC Planegg	(Switzerland) ZSC Lions	(Slovakia) HC Slovan Bratislava
2012–13	(Switzerland) ZSC Lions	(Belarus) HK Pantera Minsk	(Germany) ESC Planegg
2013–14	(Germany) ESC Planegg	(Germany) ECDC Memmingen	(Austria) EHV Sabres
2014–15	(Austria) EHV Sabres	(Germany) ESC Planegg	(Austria) Austrian Selects
2015–16	(Austria) EHV Sabres	(Switzerland) ZSC Lions	(Germany) ESC Planegg
2016–17	(Germany) ECDC Memmingen	(Germany) ERC Ingolstadt	(Slovakia) HC ŠKP Bratislava
2017–18	(Hungary) KMH Budapest	(Germany) ECDC Memmingen	(Germany) ESC Planegg
2018–19	(Austria) EHV Sabres	(Germany) ECDC Memmingen	(Germany) ESC Planegg
2019–20	(Hungary) KMH Budapest	(Germany) ESC Planegg	(Austria) EHV Sabres
2020–21	Not finished due to the COVID-19 pandemic		
2021–22	(Hungary) KMH Budapest	(Austria) EHV Sabres	(Germany) ESC Planegg
2022–23	(Hungary) Hokiklub Budapest	(Hungary) MAC Budapest	(Germany) ECDC Memmingen
2023–24	(Germany) ECDC Memmingen	(Hungary) MAC Budapest	(Switzerland) EV Zug
2024–25	(Switzerland) EV Zug	(Germany) ECDC Memmingen	(Hungary) MAC Budapest
2025–26	(Hungary) Hokiklub Budapest	(Germany) ECDC Memmingen	(Germany) Eisbären Juniors Berlin

== Medals (Nations) ==
Rank	Nation	Gold	Silver	Bronze	Total
1	Hungary	5	2	1	8
2	Germany	4	8	7	19
3	Austria	3	1	3	7
4	Switzerland	2	2	1	5
5	Belarus	0	1	0	1
6	Slovakia	0	0	2	2
Totals (6 entries)		14	14	14	42
