= 2006–07 Elite Women's Hockey League =

The 2006–07 Elite Women's Hockey League season was the third season of the Elite Women's Hockey League, a multi-national women's ice hockey league. HC Slovan Bratislava of Slovakia won the league title for the second time in a row.

== Final standings ==
Pl.		GP	W	T	L	GF–GA	Pts
1.	(Slovakia) HC Slovan Bratislava	22	21	1	0	176:19	43
2.	(Austria) EC Ravens Salzburg	22	18	1	3	167:35	37
3.	(Slovenia) HK Terme Maribor	22	17	1	4	179:55	35
4.	(Italy) HC Eagles Bozen	22	15	2	5	92:38	32
5.	(Austria) EHV Sabres	22	15	0	7	161:61	30
6.	(Italy) Agordo Hockey	22	13	1	8	103:98	27
7.	(Austria) EHC Vienna Flyers	22	8	1	13	79:93	17
8.	(Austria) DEC Dragons Klagenfurt	22	6	1	15	56:137	13
9.	(Slovenia) HK Triglav Kranj	22	5	1	16	46:154	11
10.	(Hungary) Ferencváros Stars Budapest	22	4	2	16	25:112	10
11.	(Croatia) KHL Grič Zagreb	22	2	1	19	55:224	6
12.	(Hungary) UTE Marilyn Budapest	22	1	2	19	28:141	4
