= EC Bergkamener Bären =

DFEL ice hockey club in Bergkamen, Germany

Eishockey-Club Bergkamener Bären
- City: Bergkamen, Germany
- League: DFEL
- Founded: 1982
- Home arena: Eissporthalle Bergkamen-Weddinghofen
- Colours: Red, yellow
- Head coach: Miriam Thimm
- Captain: Alena Hahn
- Affiliates: ECB Bären 2
- Website: Official website

Championships
- German Championship: 1 (2005)
- DEB Cup: 2 (2006, 2007)

The Eishockey-Club Bergkamener Bären ('Ice Hockey Club Bears of Bergkamen'), often shortened to EC Bergkamen or ECB Bären, are an ice hockey team in the German Women's Ice Hockey League (DFEL). They play in Bergkamen, a centrally-situated town in the western German state of North Rhine-Westphalia (NRW), at the Eissporthalle Bergkamen-Weddinghofen ('Bergkamen-Weddinghofen Ice Sport Hall'). Established in 1983, the team won the German Championship title in the 2004–05 season, after having won German Championship silver medals in the 1983–84 and 1985–86 seasons. In the 2005–06 and 2006–07 seasons, EC Bergkamen won the DEB Cup.

== History ==
EC Bergkamen was founded in 1982 and formed its first representative women's team in 1983, when the women's team of ERC Westfalen Dortmund was transferred to the club. The team debuted in the 1983–84 season of the NRW league. Right away, the bears were able to qualify for the final round of the German championship and achieved the runner-up title there. Until 1988, the team took part continuously in the finals, 1986 winning the runner-up could be repeated. Beginning in the 1988–89 season, the team took part in the newly founded women's ice hockey league, in which they reached the final tournament in 1994 without interruption.

In the 1997–98 season, the Bergkamener Bären were relegated from the Bundesliga, but managed to get promoted from the NRW-Liga in the following year. In the 1999/00 season, the athletic league did not succeed, but due to the dissolution of the women's team of TuS Wiehl, EC Bergkamen was able to continue to participate in the women's ice hockey national league. Under long-time coach Dirk Wefringhaus, the team managed to qualify for the Final Four tournament for the German Championship in the 2000–01 season for the first time, which was only just missed in the two following seasons. In the 2003–04 season managed again to participate in the Final Four tournament before the team was able to win the German Championship for the first time in the 2004–05 season. The Bären also won the German Cup (DEB Cup) in 2006 and 2007.

EC Bergkamen and opponents ECDC Memmingen made international ice hockey news when the shootout of their DFEL match on 23 January 2016 extended to a world record-setting 54-shots. The unprecedented overtime eventually ended in a victory for Memmingen, with Julia Seitz netting the shootout-ending 27th shot for her team.

=== ECB Bären 2 ===
From the 2001–02 season, a second team also played in the NRW state league. This moved in 2007 in the association league NRW-League and takes part in the 2008–09 season in the 2nd women's league North.

== Team honours ==
=== German Championship ===
- (gold) Champions (1): 2004–05
- (silver) Runners-up (2): 1983–84, 1985–86
- (bronze) Third Place (6): 1991–92, 2000–01, 2008–09, 2009–10, 2010–11, 2011–12

=== Other ===
- DEB Cup (2): 2006, 2007
