= German women's ice hockey Bundesliga =

German ice hockey league

German Women's Ice Hockey League Deutsche Fraueneishockey-Liga (German)
- Current season, competition or edition: 2026–27 DEFL season
- Formerly: Fraueneishockey-Endrunde
- Sport: Ice hockey
- Founded: 1988
- Founder: German Ice Hockey Federation
- First season: 1988–89
- No. of teams: 6
- Countries: Germany (4 teams); Hungary (1 team); Slovakia (1 team)
- Most recent champion: ECDC Memmingen (2025–26)
- Most titles: ESC Planegg-Würmtal (8)
- Broadcaster: DEB-Online
- Level on pyramid: 1st
- Relegation to: 2. Liga Nord or Landesliga
- Domestic cup: DEB-Pokal der Frauen
- International cup: EWHL Super Cup
- Related competitions: EWHL
- Website: Official website

The German Women's Ice Hockey League (German: Deutsche Fraueneishockey-Liga) or DFEL, also known as the Women's Bundesliga (German: Frauen-Bundesliga, lit. 'Women's Confederated League'), is the top-tier women's ice hockey league in Germany. The league is operated by the German Ice Hockey Federation (DEB, Deutscher Eishockey Bund) and was founded in 1988. As of the 2026–27 season, the DFEL comprises six teams, of which four are based in Germany and one each is based in Hungary and Slovakia.

== History ==
The German Women's Ice Hockey League was created in 1988–89. Previously, the national championship took the form of a tournament featuring the best teams from the various regional federations. The Bundesliga was initially split into two divisions, North and South, with a final championship tournament at the end of the season, but in April 2006, the participating teams voted to have only a single division, starting from the 2006–07 season.

=== 2022–23 season ===
Six teams participated in the 2022–23 DFEL season, following the withdrawal of Düsseldorfer EG after the 2019–20 season and the withdrawal of EC Köln ("Die Haie") after the 2021–22 season. The regular season began on 1 October 2022 and concluded on 19 February 2023. ECDC Memmingen were the regular season champions; the team featured both the league’s top scorer, American forward Theresa Knutson, and best goaltender, Emma Schweiger.

The top four teams from the regular season qualified for the playoffs, which were played on a best-of-five tournament schedule. In the semifinals, ECDC Memmingen swept ESC Planegg-Würmtal to take the series in three games and the Mad Dogs Mannheim bested ERC Ingolstadt in four games.

ECDC Memmingen did not slow down in the German Championship finals, sweeping Mad Dogs Mannheim in three games to claim the team’s fourth championship title.

=== 2023–24 season ===
With the addition of the Amsterdam Tigers, seven teams participated in the 2023–24 DFEL season; the Amsterdam Tigers were the 2022–23 winners of the Netherlands' championship. The regular season began on 23 September 2023 and concluded on 25 February 2024. Each team played 24 games, facing every opponent twice at home and twice away.

== Teams ==
Location in Central Europe of teams participating in the 2026–27 DFEL season.

=== 2026–27 season ===
Team	Location	Home venue	Head coach	Captain
ECDC Memmingen	Memmingen	Eissporthalle Memmingen	Jim Nagle	Daria Gleißner
Eisbären Juniors Berlin	Berlin	Wellblechpalast	Phillip Richter	Ellen Laurence
ERC Ingolstadt	Ingolstadt	Saturn Arena	Marion Allemoz	Sorsha Sabus
HK Budapest	(Hungary) Budapest	Tüskesátor	Mika Väärälä	Franciska Kiss-Simon
Hockey Team Petržalka	(Slovakia) Bratislava	Zimný štadión Vladimíra Dzurillu	Miroslav Pištek	Júlia Matejková
Mad Dogs Mannheim	Mannheim	SAP Arena	Tim Bernhardt	Tara Schmitz

=== Former teams ===
2020s
- Kölner EC, 2020–2022
- Amsterdam Tigers, 2023–24
- ESC Planegg-Würmtal, 2006–2024
- EC Bergkamener Bären, 2006–2025

== Championship record ==
Season	Champion	Second	Third
Fraueneishockey-Endrunde
1983–84	ESG Esslingen	EC Bergkamener Bären	ESV Kaufbeuren
1984–85	EHC Eisbären Düsseldorf	EV Füssen	ESG Esslingen
1985–86	EHC Eisbären Düsseldorf	EC Bergkamener Bären	EDM Köln
1986–87	EHC Eisbären Düsseldorf	ESG Esslingen	EV Füssen
1987–88	Mannheimer ERC WildCats	EHC Eisbären Düsseldorf	ESG Esslingen
DFEL
1988–89	EHC Eisbären Düsseldorf	Mannheimer ERC WildCats	ESG Esslingen
1989–90	Mannheimer ERC WildCats	EHC Eisbären Düsseldorf	OSC Berlin
1990–91	OSC Berlin	EHC Eisbären Düsseldorf	Mannheimer ERC WildCats
1991–92	Mannheimer ERC WildCats	Neusser EC	EC Bergkamener Bären
1992–93	Neusser EC	Mannheimer ERC WildCats	TuS Geretsried
1993–94	TuS Geretsried	Mannheimer ERC WildCats	Neusser EC
1994–95	ESG Esslingen	DEC Tigers Königsbrunn	TuS Geretsried
1995–96	ESG Esslingen	TuS Wiehl	TuS Geretsried
1996–97	ESG Esslingen	TuS Wiehl	Grefrather EC
1997–98	ESG Esslingen	Mannheimer ERC WildCats	TuS Geretsried
1998–99	Mannheimer ERC WildCats	TuS Geretsried	ESC Planegg-Würmtal
1999–2000	Mannheimer ERC WildCats	TuS Geretsried	TuS Wiehl
2000–01	TV Kornwestheim	TuS Geretsried	EC Bergkamener Bären
2001–02	TV Kornwestheim	SC Riessersee	OSC Berlin
2002–03	TV Kornwestheim	OSC Berlin	Mannheimer ERC WildCats
2003–04	TV Kornwestheim	OSC Berlin	SC Riessersee
2004–05	EC Bergkamener Bären	TV Kornwestheim	OSC Berlin
2005–06	OSC Berlin	ESC Planegg-Würmtal	TV Kornwestheim
2006–07	OSC Berlin	ESC Planegg-Würmtal	SC Riessersee
2007–08	ESC Planegg-Würmtal	OSC Berlin	SC Riessersee
2008–09	OSC Berlin	ESC Planegg-Würmtal	EC Bergkamener Bären
2009–10	OSC Berlin	ESC Planegg-Würmtal	EC Bergkamener Bären
2010–11	ESC Planegg-Würmtal	OSC Berlin	EC Bergkamener Bären
2011–12	ESC Planegg-Würmtal	ECDC Memmingen	EC Bergkamener Bären
2012–13	ESC Planegg-Würmtal	ECDC Memmingen	OSC Berlin
2013–14	ESC Planegg-Würmtal	OSC Berlin	ECDC Memmingen
2014–15	ESC Planegg-Würmtal	ECDC Memmingen	ERC Ingolstadt
2015–16	ECDC Memmingen	ESC Planegg-Würmtal	ERC Ingolstadt
2016–17	ESC Planegg-Würmtal	ERC Ingolstadt	ECDC Memmingen
2017–18	ECDC Memmingen	ESC Planegg-Würmtal	ERC Ingolstadt
2018–19	ECDC Memmingen	ESC Planegg-Würmtal	bronze medal not contested
2019–20	Finals between ECDC Memmingen and ESC Planegg-Würmtal cancelled due to COVID-19 pandemic		no bronze medal match
2020–21	ESC Planegg-Würmtal	Eisbären Juniors Berlin	ERC Ingolstadt
2021–22	ERC Ingolstadt	ECDC Memmingen	bronze medal not contested
2022–23	ECDC Memmingen	Mad Dogs Mannheim	bronze medal not contested
2023–24	ECDC Memmingen	ERC Ingolstadt	bronze medal not contested
2024–25	ECDC Memmingen	HK Budapest	bronze medal not contested
2025–26	ECDC Memmingen	Eisbären Juniors Berlin	bronze medal not contested

=== Medal table ===
Team	1st place, gold medalist(s)	2nd place, silver medalist(s)	3rd place, bronze medalist(s)	Total
ESC Planegg-Würmtal	8	7	1	16
ECDC Memmingen	7	4	2	13
OSC Berlin	5	5	4	14
Mannheimer ERC WildCats	5	4	2	11
ESG Esslingen	5	1	3	9
EHC Eisbären Düsseldorf	4	3	0	7
TV Kornwestheim	4	1	1	6
TuS Geretsried	1	3	4	8
EC Bergkamener Bären	1	2	5	8
ERC Ingolstadt	1	2	4	7
Neusser EC	1	1	1	3
TuS Wiehl	0	2	1	3
SC Riessersee	0	1	3	4
Eisbären Juniors Berlin	0	2	0	2
EV Füssen	0	1	1	2
DEC Tigers Königsbrunn	0	1	0	1
Mad Dogs Mannheim	0	1	0	1
HK Budapest	0	1	0	1
ESV Kaufbeuren	0	0	1	1
Kölner EC	0	0	1	1
Grefrather EC	0	0	1	1

== German Women's Cup ==
Beginning in the 2001–02 season, the German Ice Hockey Federation (DEB) organized an annual tournament called the DEB Women's Cup (German: DEB-Pokal der Frauen), which would be played over several days at the end of the DFEL season. It featured the top four or six teams from the most recent DFEL season, divided into two groups of two or three teams each. The tournament has not been held since 2018.

Record
Season	Champion	Finalist
2001–02	Grefrather EC	EHC Memmingen
2002–03	WSV Braunlage	ERC Sonthofen
2003–04	Grefrather EC	ECDC Memmingen
2004–05	Grefrather EC	ESC Planegg-Würmtal
2005–06	EC Bergkamener Bären	ECDC Memmingen
2006–07	EC Bergkamener Bären	ESC Planegg/Würmtal
2007–08	OSC Berlin	Hamburger SV
2008–09	OSC Berlin	ECDC Memmingen
2009–10	ESC Planegg-Würmtal	OSC Berlin
2010–11	OSC Berlin	ESC Planegg-Würmtal
2011–12	ESC Planegg-Würmtal	OSC Berlin
2012–13	ECDC Memmingen	ESC Planegg-Würmtal
2013–14	OSC Berlin	ESC Planegg-Würmtal
2014–15	ESC Planegg-Würmtal	ERC Ingolstadt
2015–16	ECDC Memmingen	ESC Planegg-Würmtal
2016–17	ECDC Memmingen	ESC Planegg-Würmtal
2017–18	ECDC Memmingen	ERC Ingolstadt

== See also ==
- Germany women's national ice hockey team
- European Women's Hockey League (EWHL)
