= Sportzentrum Kapfenberg =

Indoor sporting arena

Coordinates: 47.44436°N 15.297717°E

Sportzentrum Kapfenberg is an indoor sporting arena located in Kapfenberg, Austria. The capacity of the arena is 4,600 people. It is used mostly for ice hockey.
