= 2009–10 Elite Women's Hockey League =

European ice hockey tournament

The 2009–10 Elite Women's Hockey League season was the sixth season of the Elite Women's Hockey League, a multi-national women's ice hockey league. ESC Planegg/ Würmtal of Germany won the league title.

== Final standings ==
Pl.		GP	W	OTW	OTL	L	GF–GA	Pts
1.	(Germany) ESC Planegg/Würmtal	15	12	0	0	3	70:40	36
2.	(Austria) EC Ravens Salzburg	15	10	0	0	5	107:49	30
3.	(Austria) EHV Sabres	15	8	0	0	7	84:56	24
4.	(Slovakia) HC Slovan Bratislava	15	7	0	0	8	50:54	21
5.	(Slovenia) HDK Maribor	15	5	0	0	10	46:80	15
6.	(Italy) Agordo Hockey	15	3	0	0	12	48:126	9
