= Austria women's ice hockey Bundesliga =

Central European ice hockey league based in Austria

Ladies' Ice Hockey Bundesliga Dameneishockey-Bundesliga (German)
- Current season, competition or edition: 2025–26 DEBL season
- Sport: Ice hockey
- Founded: 1998
- Founder: Austrian Ice Hockey Association
- No. of teams: 11
- Country: Austria (5 teams); Croatia (1 team); Hungary (4 teams); Slovenia (1 team)
- Most recent champion: (Austria) IceCats Linz AG (2025–26)
- Most titles: (Austria) EHV Sabres (5)
- Related competitions: EWHL
- Website: Official website

The Ladies' Ice Hockey Bundesliga (German: Dameneishockey-Bundesliga, lit. 'Ladies' Ice Hockey Confederated League') or DEBL is a multi-national ice hockey league operated by the Austrian Ice Hockey Association (ÖEHV). It was founded in 1998 and originally served as the Austrian Championship league in women's ice hockey – the national championshup (German: Staatsmeisterschaft) has been contested in a separate tournament since the introduction of international teams to the DEBL in the 2008–09 season. Austria had 615 female players in 2013.

== History ==
Founded in 1998, the league uses a format of home and away matches. In the 2004–05 season, the best Austrian teams additionally also competed in the international Elite Women's Hockey League (EWHL). From the following season onward, the top teams only played in the EWHL, making the Bundesliga in a sense the second-level league of Austrian Women's ice hockey. As a result, the title of Austrian champion is decided in a separate tournament titled Staatsmeisterschaft (National Championship), featuring the three teams that play in the EWHL and the top DEBL team. Exceptions were the 2006–07 and 2007–08 seasons where EWHL clubs were the only competing teams. Since 2008, following the example of the men's Austrian Hockey League, the DEBL has also featured teams from Croatia, Hungary, Slovenia, and Turkey.

== Format ==
2017–18 season

The nine teams of the DEBL are assembled into one division. The teams play each other three times a year.

The top DEBL team qualifies for the Staatsmeisterschaft where it meets the three Austrian teams from the EWHL. The tournament uses a home- and away-game format. The two top teams contest the final, using a best-of-three format. The better-placed team has the right to contest the first game in its home ground. The other two teams contest the third-place play-off, also using a best-of-three format.

== Teams ==
=== 2025–26 season ===
Eleven teams participated in the 2025–26 DEBL season: five from Austria, four from Hungary, and one each from Croatia and Slovenia.

Team	Location	Home venue	Head coach
DHC IceCats Linz AG	(Austria) Linz	Linz AG Eisarena	Harald Fülöp
EAC Capitals	(Austria) Vienna	Steffl Arena	Jan Lebis
EC-KAC	(Austria) Klagenfurt	Heidi Horten Arena	Harald Ofner
Ferencvárosi TC	(Hungary) Budapest	FTC-Telekom Rink	Bernadett Holzer
Graz99ers Huskies II	(Austria) Graz	Merkur Eisstadion	Cody Wickstrom
HDK Maribor	(Slovenia) Maribor	Ledna dvorana Tabor	Adi Drnda
HK Budapest II	(Hungary) Budapest	Tüskesator	Vivien Somogyi
HK Siscia	(Croatia) Sisak	Ledena dvorana Zibel	Branko Lončarević
MAC Marilyn Budapest	(Hungary) Budapest	Kisstadion	Kristóf Schmál
Rampage Veszprém	(Hungary) Veszprém	Jégcsarnok Veszprém	Máté Pukli
Villach Lady Hawks II	(Austria) Villach	Stadthalle; Secondary: Ossiacher See Halle (Steindorf)	Anthony London

=== Past participants ===
Austria

- EC Grazer Eishexen (Graz), 2001–2004
- EC Kitzbühel (Kitzbühel), 2012–13
- SpG Kitzbühel/Kufstein (Kitzbühel), 2015–2022
- EHC Kundl Crocodiles (Kundl), 2002–2004
- KSV Neuberg Highlanders (Neuberg an der Mürz), 2005–2013 & 2019–2021
- DEHC Red Angels Innsbruck (Innsbruck), 1998–2010
- EHV Sabres (Vienna), 1999–2005
- EHV Sabres II (Vienna), 2006–07 & 2010–2016
- EC The Ravens Salzburg (Salzburg), 2002–2005
- EHC Wildcats St. Johann (St. Johann in Tirol), 1998–2002
- WE-V Flyers II (Vienna), 2005–2008
- SpG WE-V Flyers/KSV Neuberg Highlanders, 2016–2019

Croatia

- Grič Zagreb (Zagreb), 2012–2019

Hungary

- Angels Dunaújváros (Dunaújváros), 2023–24
- Hokiklub Budapest II (Budapest), 2015–2023
  - KMH Budapest II, 2015–2022
- KSI SE Budapest (Budapest), 2021–2023
- Óbudai Hockey Academy (Budapest), 2017–18

Slovenia

- HDK Maribor (Maribor), 2011–2015
- HK Celje (Celje), 2009–2011
- HK Triglav (Kranj), 2008–2014
- Slovenia Select (Ljubljana), 2022–23
- SpG Triglav/Olimpija, 2015–16

Turkey

- Turkey women's national team, 2011–12

== Championship record ==
=== DEBL Champions by season ===
Season	(gold) Champion	(silver) Runner-up	(bronze) Third Place
1998-99	Gipsy Girls Villach	Vienna Flyers	DEHC Red Angels Innsbruck
1999-2000	Gipsy Girls Villach	EHV Sabres Vienna	not contested
2000-01	Vienna Flyers	EHV Sabres Vienna	not contested
2001-02	EHV Sabres Vienna	Vienna Flyers	not contested
2002-03	EHV Sabres Vienna	EC The Ravens Salzburg	DEC Dragons Klagenfurt
2003-04	EHV Sabres Vienna	EC The Ravens Salzburg	DEC Dragons Klagenfurt
2004-05	EHV Sabres Vienna	EC The Ravens Salzburg	DEC Dragons Klagenfurt
2005-06	DEHC Red Angels Innsbruck	Gipsy Girls Villach	1. DEC Devils Graz
2006-07	Gipsy Girls Villach	DEHC Red Angels Innsbruck	1. DEC Devils Graz
2007-08	DEC Dragons Klagenfurt	SPG Kitzbühel/Salzburg	Gipsy Girls Villach
2008-09	(Slovenia) HK Triglav Kranj	DEC Dragons Klagenfurt	Neuberg Highlanders
2009-10	SPG Kitzbühel/Salzburg	(Slovenia) HK Celje	(Slovenia) HK Triglav Kranj
2010-11	Neuberg Highlanders	(Slovenia) HK Triglav Kranj	EHV Sabres Vienna II
2011-12	Neuberg Highlanders	EHV Sabres Vienna II	(Slovenia) HDK Maribor
2012-13	Neuberg Highlanders	(Slovenia) HDK Maribor	(Croatia) Grič Zagreb
2013-14	(Croatia) KHL Grič Zagreb	Gipsy Girls Villach	(Slovenia) HK Triglav Kranj
2014-15	EHV Sabres Vienna II	(Croatia) KHL Grič Zagreb	(Slovenia) HDK Maribor
2015-16	(Slovenia) SpG HK Triglav/HK Olimpija	(Hungary) KMH Budapest II	SpG Kitzbühel/Kufstein
2016-17	(Hungary) KMH Budapest II	SpG Vienna/Neuberg	SpG Kitzbühel/Kufstein
2017-18	(Hungary) Óbudai Hockey Academy	(Hungary) KMH Budapest II	SpG Kitzbühel/Kufstein
2018-19	(Hungary) Ferencvárosi TC	(Hungary) KMH Budapest II	SpG Kitzbühel/Kufstein
2019-20	Neuberg Highlanders	(Hungary) KMH Budapest II	not contested
2020-21	(Hungary) KMH Budapest II	Neuberg Highlanders	1. DEC Devils Graz
2021-22	(Hungary) MAC Marilyn Budapest	(Hungary) Hokiklub Budapest II	Villach Lady Hawks
2022-23	Villach Lady Hawks	1. DEC Devils Graz	(Hungary) Ferencvárosi TC
2023-24	EAC Women Capitals	Villach Lady Hawks	Graz99ers Huskies II
2024-25	Villach Lady Hawks	EC-KAC	EAC Women Capitals
2025-26	IceCats Linz	Villach Lady Hawks	

== DEBL2 ==
In 2004, due to the increasing number of teams, a second division called DEBL2 (also DEBL II) was created. There was no match play in this league in the 2007–08 and 2008–09 seasons.

The team that finishes at the bottom of the DEBL league table at the end of the season meets the top team of the DEBL II over a best-of-three series. The winner of that contest then plays in the DEBL during the next season, while the loser is relegated to the second DEBL.

=== Teams ===
==== 2025–26 season ====
Six teams participated in the 2025–26 DEBL2 season. All of the teams were based in Austria and three of the teams were the farm teams of DEBL clubs.

- DHC IceCats Linz AG II (Linz)
- Graz99ers Huskies III (Graz)
- Red Angels Innsbruck (Innsbruck)
- SC Samina Hohenems 1974 (Hohenems)
- SPG Kitzbühel/Kufstein (Kufstein)
- VSV Lady Hawks III (Villach)

=== Championship history ===
Regular season champions
Season	Champion
2004-05	Kundl Crocodiles
2005-06	EHV Sabres II
2006-07	Ravens Salzburg II
2007-09	not contested
2009-10	(Hungary) FTC Eagles Budapest
2010-11	EC "Die Adler" Kitzbühel
2011-12	Neuberg Highlanders II
2012-13	DEC Devils Graz
2013-14	SPG Kitzbühel/Salzburg
2014-15	SPG Kitzbühel/Salzburg
2015-16	(Slovenia) HDK Maribor
2016-17	Red Angels Innsbruck

== See also ==
- Austria women's national ice hockey team
- European Women's Hockey League (EWHL)
- DEC Salzburg Eagles
