= HK Pantera Minsk =

- City: Minsk, Belarus
- League: Elite Women's Hockey League; Latvia Open Championship
- Founded: 2010
- Folded: 2013
- Colours: Red, White
- Website: hcpantera.by (archived)

HK Pantera Minsk was a women's ice hockey club from Belarus. Founded in 2010, it was the first professional women's ice hockey team in the country.

HK Pantera Minsk played in the international Elite Women's Hockey League, which it won in the 2012–13 season with Jess Jones as team captain. The team also competed in the IIHF European Women's Champions Cup, and won the Latvia Open Championship twice.

The club was meant to form the basis for a Belarus national team, but it folded in 2013 due to a lack of funding.
