= DEC Salzburg Eagles =

EWHL ice hockey team in Salzburg, Austria

- City: Salzburg, Austria
- League: European Women's Hockey League →DEBL (2002–2005)
- Founded: 2001
- Home arena: Eisarena Salzburg
- Colours: Gold, black, white
- Head coach: Eva-Maria Verworner
- Captain: Julia Mayr
- Affiliates: DEC Salzburg Farmteam
- Website: salzburg-eagles.at

Franchise history
- 2001–2010: EC The Ravens Salburg
- 2010–: DEC Salzburg Eagles

Championships
- Austrian Championship: 2 (2005–06, 2008–09)

Logo of The Ravens Salzburg, used 2001 to 2010

The DEC Salzburg Eagles are an Austrian ice hockey club in the European Women's Hockey League (EWHL). They play in Salzburg, Austria at the Eisarena Salzburg.

The club was founded as EC The Ravens Salzburg in 2001 and was the first women's ice hockey enterprise established in Salzburg. It was renamed Damen Eishockey Club (DEC) Salzburg Eagles (lit. 'Ladies' Ice Hockey Club Salzburg Eagles') in 2010.

== History ==
The Ravens gained promotion to the Dameneishockey-Bundesliga (DEBL) at the end of their first season, 2001–02. They made their DEBL debut in the 2002–03 season and continued in the league for the 2003–04 and 2004–05 seasons.

In 2005, they left the DEBL to join the multi-national Elite Women's Hockey League (EWHL; renamed European Women's Hockey League in 2019).

== Team honours ==
=== Austrian Championship ===
The Austrian championship title was awarded to the winner of the DEBL playoffs until a separate tournament for the Austrian national ice hockey championship (German: Österreichische Eishockey-Staatsmeisterschaft) was introduced in the 2005–06 season.

- (gold) Champions (2): 2006, 2009
- (silver) Runners-up (15): 2003, 2004, 2005, 2007, 2008, 2010, 2011, 2013, 2014, 2015, 2016, 2017, 2018, 2019, 2021
- (bronze) Third Place (3): 2012, 2022, 2023

=== EWHL Championship ===
- (silver) Runners-up (5): 2006–07, 2007–08, 2009–10, 2015–16, 2016–17
- (bronze) Third Place (2): 2012–13, 2014–15

== See also ==
- Austria women's ice hockey Bundesliga
