= 2023–24 SDHL season =

17th ice hockey season of the SDHL

- League: SDHL
- Sport: Ice hockey
- Duration: 24 September 2023 – 20 February 2024
- Games: 36
- Teams: 10

Regular Season
- Season champions: Luleå HF/MSSK
- Runners-up: MoDo Hockey
- Top scorer: Noora Tulus, Luleå HF/MSSK

Playoffs
- Finals champions: Luleå HF/MSSK
- Runners-up: MoDo Hockey

SDHL seasons
- 2022–23 2024–25

The 2023–24 SDHL season was the seventeenth ice hockey season of the Swedish Women's Hockey League (SDHL). The regular season began on 24 September 2023 and concluded on 20 February 2024. The playoffs began on 23 February and concluded on 19 March, with Luleå HF/MSSK claiming their seventh Swedish Championship title after a three-game sweep of MoDo Hockey in the finals.

== Teams ==
Location of SDHL teams in Sweden

No SDHL teams were relegated at the end of the 2022–23 SDHL season due to Göteborg HC's mid-season withdrawal from the league in November 2022. The nine teams that completed the 2022–23 season returned for the 2023–24 season and were joined by Frölunda HC, the Nationella Damhockeyligan (NDHL) champions of the 2023 Kvalserie till SDHL. The promotion of Frölunda HC brought the number of teams participating in the league back to ten.

The season marks the first time in league history that fewer than sixty percent of active players are of Swedish nationality. Import players hail from fifteen different countries, with the largest contingents coming from Canada (20 players), Czechia (19 players), and Finland (19 players).

In contrast to the rising number of import players, the number of Swedish captains increased from two in the 2022–23 season to five at the start of the 2023–24 season – with AIK, Brynäs IF, Frölunda HC, Linköping HC, and MoDo Hockey all sporting Swedish captains. The remaining five captaincies were filled by two Canadians (Djurgårdens IF and Leksands IF), two Finns (HV71 and Luleå HF/MSSK), and one Netherlander (SDE HF).

Alternate captain Michelle Karvinen stepped into the Frölunda HC captaincy on an interim basis after captain Hanna Olsson sustained a season-ending hamstring injury caused by a blindsided open-ice hit from Luleå forward Petra Nieminen on 13 October 2023. HV71's captain, Sanni Hakala, ended her ice hockey career on 30 November 2023 due to injuries sustained in a match earlier in the month; HV71 alternate captain Elin Svensson was named captain shortly thereafter.

Team	City	Arena	Head coach	Captain
AIK	Solna	Ritorps Ishall	Olle Öhrqvist	Vilma Nilsson
Brynäs IF	Gävle	Monitor ERP Arena	Filip Eriksson	Maja Nylén Persson
Djurgårdens IF	Stockholm	Hovet	Rickard Hårdstam	Brette Pettet
Frölunda HC	Gothenburg	Frölundaborg	Erika Holst	Michelle Karvinen; Hanna Olsson
HV71	Jönköping	Husqvarna Garden	Ulf Hall	Elin Svensson; Sanni Hakala
Leksands IF	Leksand	Tegera Arena	Jordan Colliton	Anna Purschke
Linköping HC	Linköping	Stångebro Ishall	Jan Bylesjö	Sara Hjalmarsson
Luleå HF/MSSK	Luleå	Coop Norrbotten Arena	Jens Själin	Jenni Hiirikoski
MoDo Hockey	Örnsköldsvik	Hägglunds Arena	Jared Cipparone	Ebba Berglund
SDE Hockey	Danderyd	Enebybergs Ishall	Nicklas Stensson	Julie Zwarthoed

== Regular season ==
The 2023–24 SDHL season began on 24 September 2023 and ended on 20 February 2024. The schedule comprised 36 games per team, in which each team played every opponent four times – twice at home and twice away.

=== Standings ===
Pos	Team	Pld	W	OTW	OTL	L	GF	GA	GD	Pts
1	Luleå HF	36	29	4	1	2	173	62	+111	96
2	MoDo Hockey	36	20	5	3	8	119	68	+51	73
3	Brynäs IF	36	16	9	3	8	126	73	+53	69
4	Frölunda HC	36	17	6	1	12	97	86	+11	64
5	Djurgårdens IF	36	16	3	5	12	82	75	+7	59
6	Linköping HC	36	17	1	4	14	104	90	+14	57
7	SDE HF	36	11	2	4	19	98	111	−13	41
8	Leksands IF	36	11	0	7	18	76	95	−19	40
9	HV71	36	8	2	6	20	82	139	−57	34
10	AIK	36	1	2	0	33	39	197	−158	7

Source: Svenska Ishockeyförbundet

=== Statistics ===
==== Scoring leaders ====
The following players were the regular season point leaders at the conclusion of the 2023–24 season on 20 February 2024.

Player	Team	GP	G	A	Pts	PIM	+/–
Noora Tulus	Luleä	36	22	39	61	8	+33
Viivi Vainikka	Luleä	36	23	29	52	0	+40
Lina Ljungblom	MoDo	36	23	23	46	12	+32
Petra Nieminen	Luleä	33	24	21	45	16	+25
Emma Nordin	Luleä	35	19	24	43	2	+32
Haruka Toko	Linköping	36	13	30	43	2	+23
Sara Hjalmarsson	Linköping	36	18	23	41	20	+14
Michelle Karvinen	Frölunda	36	21	18	39	24	+7
Jaycee Magwood	Luleä	34	12	27	39	14	+29
Hanna Thuvik	Brynäs	36	21	17	38	12	+28
Jenniina Nylund	Brynäs	36	15	23	38	20	+20
Maja Nylén Persson	Brynäs	36	11	27	38	8	+20
Justine Reyes	Linköping	25	23	12	35	2	+16
Jenni Hiirikoski	Luleå	36	9	24	33	4	+39
Mathea Fischer	SDE	36	14	18	32	16	–4
Shae Demale	SDE	36	21	10	31	18	+1
Anneke Linser	Djurgården	36	14	17	31	32	+29
Elin Svensson	HV71	34	20	10	30	16	+6
Michelle Löwenhielm	SDE	34	11	19	30	16	±0
Adéla Šapovalivová	MoDo	32	11	18	29	6	+26

==== Goaltenders ====
The following goaltenders played at least one-third of their team's minutes in net during the 2023–24 regular season, sorted by save percentage.

Player	Team	GPI	TOI	W	L	GA	SO	SV%	GAA
Ebba Svensson Träff	Linköping	25	1,503:51	13	12	51	2	93.83	2.03
Andrea Brändli	MoDo	25	1,514:10	16	9	41	2	93.66	1.62
Klára Peslarová	Brynäs	20	1,228:57	14	6	36	3	93.50	1.76
Stephanie Neatby	Frölunda	26	1,565:43	15	11	62	4	93.22	2.38
Ida Boman	Djurgården	27	1,618:59	13	14	51	6	92.98	1.89
Frida Axell	Luleå	17	1,026:53	16	1	26	3	91.39	1.52
Sara Grahn	Luleå	19	1,151:11	17	2	34	4	90.84	1.77
Ellen Jonsson	Leksands	16	909:50	6	10	34	0	90.71	2.24
Emma Polusny	Leksands	22	1,251:20	5	15	55	3	90.30	2.64
Viktorie Švejdová	SDE	24	1,337:52	7	15	63	1	89.77	2.83
Blanka Škodová	AIK	17	953:46	2	13	79	0	89.70	4.97
Lina Jansson	HV71	23	1,339:20	10	12	71	0	89.51	3.18
Kate Stuart	SDE	15	824:30	6	8	42	3	88.68	3.06
Linnea Holterud Olsson	AIK	14	839:35	0	14	80	0	86.35	5.72
Anni Keisala	HV71	14	838:54	0	14	65	0	84.34	4.65

== Playoffs ==
The 2024 Swedish Championship playoffs (Swedish: SM-slutspel 2024) began on Friday, 23 February 2024. Entering the playoffs, Luleå HF/MSSK, reigning 2023 Swedish Champion and the 2023–24 regular season champion, was favored for the 2024 Swedish Championship title.

=== Bracket ===
As of 19 March 2024

Quarterfinals
1	Luleå/MSSK	4	5	4	–	–	3
8	Leksand	2	2	0	–	–	0
4	Frölunda	2	0	4	3	2	3
5	Djurgården	1	3	3	4	1	2
2	MoDo	4	5	1	–	–	3
7	SDE	3	1	0	–	–	0
3	Brynäs	2	4	2	–	–	3
6	Linköping	1	3	1	–	–	0

Semifinals
Luleå/MSSK	1	4	6	–	3
Frölunda	0	1	1	–	0
MoDo	1	5	3	2	3
Brynäs	2	3	2	0	1

Finals
1st place, gold medalist(s)	Luleå/MSSK	4	4	4	3
2nd place, silver medalist(s)	MoDo	1	1	2	0

=== Quarterfinals ===
The Swedish Championship quarterfinals (Swedish: SM-kvartsfinalen) began on Friday, 23 February and concluded on Friday, 1 March. Home game advantage was granted to the higher seeded team for the second, third, and fifth games of the series. All four higher-seeded teams won their series and progressed to the semifinals. The top-three ranked teams from the regular season – Luleå HF/MSSK, MoDo Hockey, and Brynäs IF – swept their quarterfinal series in three games. Fourth ranked Frölunda HC beat fifth seeded Djurgårdens IF in five games.

==== (1) Luleå vs. (8) Leksand ====
All times local, Central European Time (UTC+1)

23 February 2024; 18:05	Leksands IF	2–4 (0–1, 1–1, 1–2)	Luleå HF/MSSK	Tegera Arena, Leksand; Attendance: 120

Ellen Jonsson
Goalies
Sara Grahn
Referees:
Markus Yngvesson
Felipe Londoño
Linesmen:
Sebastian Proos
Axel Forsberg

	0–1	14:54 – Vainikka (Hiirikoski, Tulus)
	0–2	20:24 – Tulus (Nordin, Hiirikoski) (PP)
Baudrit (Radová, Af Bjur) – 33:42	1–2
	1–3	40:27 – Nordin (Kjellbin)
	1–4	46:55 – Vainikka (Nieminen)
Sarnovská (MacDougall, Radová) – 51:56	2–4

4 min
Penalties
4 min
28
Shots
30

25 February 2024; 12:05	Luleå HF/MSSK	5–2 (1–1, 0–0, 4–1)	Leksands IF	Coop Norrbotten Arena, Luleå; Attendance: 617

Frida Axell
Goalies
Emma Polusny
Referees:
Ida Henriksson
Jimmy Andersson
Linesmen:
Hanna Öberg
Wilma Westlund

Nieminen (Savolainen, Tulus) (PP) – 06:13	1–0
	1–1	13:38 – Amy
Vainikka (Hiirikoski, Tulus) – 43:12	2–1
	2–2	45:40 – Tynell-Nissas
Hiirikoski (Savolainen, Nieminen) (PP) – 49:38	3–2
Magwood – 55:41	4–2
Vainikka (Nieminen, Tulus) (EN-EQ) – 58:12	5–2

0 min
Penalties
6 min
39
Shots
14

26 February 2024; 18:05	Luleå HF/MSSK	4–0 (2–0, 1–0, 1–0)	Leksands IF	Coop Norrbotten Arena, Luleå; Attendance: 704

Sara Grahn
Goalies
Ellen Jonsson
Referees:
Ida Henriksson
Jimmy Andersson
Linesmen:
Hanna Öberg
Wilma Westlund

Tulus (Vainikka, Magwood) – 02:01	1–0
Savolainen (Nordin, Nieminen) – 05:39	2–0
Tulus (Pejšová, Savolainen) – 25:42	3–0
Lin. Johansson (Lis. Johansson) – 57:54	4–0

2 min
Penalties
10 min
36
Shots
18

==== (4) Frölunda vs. (5) Djurgården ====
All times local, Central European Time (UTC+1)

23 February 2024; 18:05	Djurgårdens IF	1–2 (1–0, 0–2, 0–0)	Frölunda HC	Stora Mossen, Bromma (Stockholm); Attendance: 112

Ida Boman
Goalies
Stephanie Neatby
Referees:
Joakim Flink
Sabina Küller
Linesmen:
Ottilia Classon
Patric Pettersson

Linser (Sohrner, Östensson) (PP) – 10:55	1–0
	1–1	29:25 – Dalen (Karvinen, Kandell)
	1–2	32:18 – Nilsson (Lundin)

6 min
Penalties
10 min
31
Shots
22

25 February 2024; 12:05	Frölunda HC	0–3 (0–1, 0–0, 0–2)	Djurgårdens IF	Frölundaborg Isstadion, Frölunda; Attendance: 455

Stephanie Neatby
Goalies
Ida Boman
Referees:
Sabina Küller
Fredrik Börjesson-Tysnes
Linesmen:
Johan Granath
Jessica Lundgren

0–1	05:56 – Plosová (Pettet, Hall) (PP)
0–2	57:43 – Östensson (EN-EQ)
0–3	58:46 – Plosová (Hall, Pettet) (EN-EQ)

4 min
Penalties
4 min
34
Shots
44

26 February 2024; 18:05	Frölunda HC	4–3 OT (1–1, 0–0, 2–2) (OT: 1–0)	Djurgårdens IF	Frölundaborg Isstadion, Frölunda; Attendance: 474

Stephanie Neatby
Goalies
Lia Leiderö Palmlöv
Ida Boman
Referees:
Sabina Küller
Fredrik Börjesson-Tysnes
Linesmen:
Dennis Gunnarsson
Jessica Lundgren

	0–1	16:39 – Pettet (Forsgren, Tyreskog)
Karvinen (Kandell, Lundin) – 19:55	1–1
	1–2	40:23 – Hall
	1–3	44:36 – Hall (Pettet, Posick)
Karvinen (Dalen, Linder) – 56:28	2–3
Wikner-Zienkiewicz (Lundin, Dalen) – 58:44	3–3
Dalen (Karvinen, Yearwood) – 66:07	4–3

6 min
Penalties
0 min
39
Shots
43

28 February 2024; 18:05	Djurgårdens IF	4–3 OT (1–1, 1–0, 1–2) (OT: 1–0)	Frölunda HC	Stora Mossen, Bromma (Stockholm); Attendance: 163

Ida Boman
Goalies
Stephanie Neatby
Referees:
Ida Henriksson
Alexandra Köhl
Linesmen:
Jessica Lundgren
Wilma Westlund

Östensson (Haasová, Sohrner) – 06:26	1–0
	1–1	14:53 – Karvinen (Nilsson)
Hall (Forsgren) – 23:25	2–1
Säkkinen (Vocetková) – 45:54	3–1
	3–2	46:25 – Dalen (PP)
	3–3	52:47 – Karvinen (Lundin, Vesa)
Haasová (Tyreskog) – 76:09	4–3

6 min
Penalties
8 min
31
Shots
28

1 March 2024; 18:05	Frölunda HC	2–1 (1–0, 1–1, 0–0)	Djurgårdens IF	Frölundaborg Isstadion, Frölunda; Attendance: 625

Stephanie Neatby
Goalies
Ida Boman
Referees:
Ida Henriksson
Fredrik Börjesson-Tysnes
Linesmen:
Jessica Lundgren
Dennis Gunnarsson

Wikner-Zienkiewicz (Lundin, Karvinen) – 06:56	1–0
	1–1	24:46 – Plosová (Pettet)
Dalen (Strandberg, Lundin) – 35:56	2–1

6 min
Penalties
2 min
12
Shots
24

==== (2) MoDo vs. (7) SDE ====
All times local, Central European Time (UTC+1)

23 February 2024; 18:05	SDE Hockey	3–4 (1–0, 1–3, 1–1)	MoDo Hockey	Enebybergs Ishall, Danderyd; Attendance: 72

Viktorie Švejdová
Goalies
Andrea Brändli
Referees:
Fredrik Engert
Andreas Wikström
Linesmen:
William Lindfors
Oskar Kuoppala

Rogge (Jones, Hamers) – 13:15	1–0
	1–1	21:10 – Ljungblom (Hedqvist, Šapovalivová) (PP2)
	1–2	25:12 – Sundin (Bellefontaine, Savander)
Dabrowski (Löwenhielm, Hamers) (PP) – 38:15	2–2
	2–3	38:25 – Hedqvist (Klimek, El-Mahmadi)
	2–4	54:06 – Ljungblom (House, Seitz)
Winbo (Hamers, Löwenhielm) (PP) – 57:44	3–4

12 min
Penalties
8 min
28
Shots
34

25 February 2024; 12:05	MoDo Hockey	5–1 (1–1, 0–0, 4–0)	SDE Hockey	Hägglunds Arena, Örnsköldsvik; Attendance: 300

Andrea Brändli
Goalies
Viktorie Švejdová
Referees:
Maria Furberg
Alexandra Köhl
Linesmen:
Ottilia Classon
Tova Andersson

Hallin (Šapovalivová, Hedqvist) (PP) – 02:20	1–0
	1–1	17:56 – Rogge (Jones)
Ljungblom (Hedqvist, Šapovalivová) (PP) – 42:39	2–1
Sundin (Klimek) – 47:30	3–1
Moloughny (EN) – 57:38	4–1
Ljungblom (EN) – 59:09	5–1

6 min
Penalties
4 min
37
Shots
27

26 February 2024; 18:05	MoDo Hockey	1–0 (0–0, 1–0, 0–0)	SDE Hockey	Hägglunds Arena, Örnsköldsvik; Attendance: 325

Andrea Brändli	Goalies	Kate Stuart	Referees: Maria Furberg; Alexandra Köhl; Linesmen: Ottilia Classon; Tova Andersson
Ljungblom (Seitz, Šapovalivová) – 28:50 / 1–0			Referees: Maria Furberg; Alexandra Köhl; Linesmen: Ottilia Classon; Tova Andersson
2 min	Penalties	4 min	Referees: Maria Furberg; Alexandra Köhl; Linesmen: Ottilia Classon; Tova Andersson
33	Shots	29	Referees: Maria Furberg; Alexandra Köhl; Linesmen: Ottilia Classon; Tova Andersson

==== (3) Brynäs vs. (6) Linköping ====
All times local, Central European Time (UTC+1)

23 February 2024; 18:05	Linköping HC	1–2 OT (1–0, 0–1, 0–0) (OT: 0–1)	Brynäs IF	Saab Arena, Linköping; Attendance: 333

Ebba Svensson Träff
Goalies
Klára Peslarová
Referees:
Marcus Linde
Anna Hammar
Linesmen:
Julia Johansson
Jessica Lundgren

Toko (PP) – 09:01	1–0
	1–1	28:04 – Čajanová (Neubauerová, Thuvik)
	1–2	61:37 – Antonsson (Nylén-Persson, Čajanová)

6 min
Penalties
6 min
19
Shots
33

25 February 2024; 12:05	Brynäs IF	4–3 OT2 (1–1, 0–1, 2–1) (OT1: 0–0) (OT2: 1–0)	Linköping HC	Monitor ERP Arena, Gävle; Attendance: 267

Klára Peslarová
Goalies
Jorinde Heller
Referees:
Markus Yngvesson
Anna Hammar
Linesmen:
Hanna Persson
Mathias Ramberg

Thuvik (Čajanová) – 06:08	1–0
	1–1	09:25 – Tóth
	1–2	32:37 – Blom
Nylén-Persson (Nylund) – 52:28	2–2
Nylén-Persson (Nylund) – 54:55	3–2
	3–3	57:48 – Reyes
Antonsson (Sandberg, Neubauerová) – 85:55	4–3

4 min
Penalties
4 min
42
Shots
38

26 February 2024; 18:05	Brynäs IF	2–1 (0–1, 1–0, 1–0)	Linköping HC	Monitor ERP Arena, Gävle; Attendance: 265

Klára Peslarová
Goalies
Jorinde Heller
Referees:
Markus Yngvesson
Anna Hammar
Linesmen:
Hanna Persson
Simon Lindberg

	0–1	17:49 – Hjalmarsson (Blom, Toko) (PP)
Karjalainen (Östlund, Antonsson) – 36:50	1–1
Thuvik (Lindell) – 53:31	2–1

8 min
Penalties
6 min
21
Shots
25

=== Semifinals ===
The Swedish Championship semifinals will begin on Monday, 4 March and conclude no later than Tuesday, 12 March. Home game advantage was granted to the higher seeded team for the second and third games of the series.

==== Luleå vs. Frölunda ====
All times local, Central European Time (UTC+1)

4 March 2024; 18:05	Frölunda HC	0–1 (0–0, 0–0, 0–1)	Luleå HF/MSSK	Frölundaborg Isstadion, Gothenburg; Attendance: 740

Stephanie Neatby	Goalies	Sara Grahn	Referees: Anna Hammar; Markus Yngvesson; Linesmen: Johan Granath; Dennis Gunnarsson
0–1 / 49:34 – Pirttijärvi (Nordin, Nieminen)			Referees: Anna Hammar; Markus Yngvesson; Linesmen: Johan Granath; Dennis Gunnarsson
6 min	Penalties	6 min	Referees: Anna Hammar; Markus Yngvesson; Linesmen: Johan Granath; Dennis Gunnarsson
19	Shots	37	Referees: Anna Hammar; Markus Yngvesson; Linesmen: Johan Granath; Dennis Gunnarsson

6 March 2024; 18:05	Luleå HF/MSSK	4–1 (2–0, 1–1, 1–0)	Frölunda HC	Coop Norrbotten Arena, Luleå; Attendance: 1,662

Sara Grahn
Goalies
Stephanie Neatby
Referees:
Sabina Küller
Alexandra Köhl
Linesmen:
Hanna Öberg
Josef Lundgren

Pirttijärvi (Hiirikoski, Tulus) (PP) – 14:26	1–0
Nordin (Nieminen, Pirttijärvi) – 19:51	2–0
	2–1	20:33 – Wikner-Zienkiewicz (Lundin, Nilsson)
Lis. Johansson (Hiirikoski, Lin. Johansson) – 27:53	3–1
Nieminen (Pirttijärvi) – 55:34	4–1

2 min
Penalties
8 min
43
Shots
21

8 March 2024; 18:05	Luleå HF/MSSK	6–1 (2–0, 2–1, 2–0)	Frölunda HC	Coop Norrbotten Arena, Luleå; Attendance: 1,886

Sara Grahn
Goalies
Stephanie Neatby
Referees:
Sabina Küller
Robin Forslund
Linesmen:
Hanna Öberg
Joel Norum

Vainikka (Pejšová, Tulus) – 05:05	1–0
Lis. Johansson (Sjölund, Sturk) – 16:15	2–0
	2–1	28:38 – Dalen (Karvinen)
Nordin (Pirttijärvi) – 35:02	3–1
Lindeberg (Tulus, Magwood) – 35:38	4–1
Tulus (Lindeberg, Magwood) – 41:28	5–1
Nieminen (Nordin, Tulus) (PP) – 56:15	6–1

0 min
Penalties
4 min
43
Shots
14

==== MoDo vs. Brynäs ====
All times local, Central European Time (UTC+1)

4 March 2024; 18:05	Brynäs IF	2–1 OT (1–0, 0–1, 0–0) (OT: 1–0)	MoDo Hockey	Monitor ERP Arena, Gävle; Attendance: 614

Klára Peslarová
Goalies
Andrea Brändli
Referees:
Maria Furberg
Ida Henriksson
Linesmen:
Simon Lindberg
Joel Norum

Čajanová – 08:29	1–0
	1–1	33:33 – Moloughny
Östlund (Karjalainen, Waxin) (PP) – 73:30	2–1

0 min
Penalties
4 min
48
Shots
23

6 March 2024; 18:05	MoDo Hockey	5–3 (2–0, 1–3, 2–0)	Brynäs IF	Hägglunds Arena, Örnsköldsvik; Attendance: 495

Andrea Brändli
Goalies
Felicia Frank
Referees:
Robin Forslund
Ludwig Gran
Linesmen:
Jessica Lundgren
Ottilia Classon

Ljungblom (Šapovalivová) (PP) – 15:40	1–0
House (Hallin, Hedqvist) (PP) – 17:51	2–0
Bellefontaine (Sundin, Seitz) (PP) – 27:06	3–0
	3–1	27:45 – Nylund (Brenkle)
	3–2	35:26 – Östlund (Waxin) (PP)
	3–3	36:00 – Neubauerová (Čajanová, Nylén-Persson)
Sundin (Ljungblom, House) – 58:40	4–3
Ljungblom (House) (EN) – 59:04	5–3

8 min
Penalties
8 min
47
Shots
26

8 March 2024; 18:05	MoDo Hockey	3–2 OT2 (0–1, 1–0, 1–1) (OT1: 0–0) (OT2: 1–0)	Brynäs IF	Hägglunds Arena, Örnsköldsvik; Attendance: 1,014

Andrea Brändli
Goalies
Klára Peslarová
Referees:
Ida Henriksson
Maria Furberg
Linesmen:
Jessica Lundgren
Ottilia Classon

	0–1	10:52 – Schneider
Hallin (Seitz, Ljungblom) – 30:50	1–1
Hallin (Přibylová, Bellefontaine) – 49:09	2–1
	2–2	59:07 – Thuvik (Nylund)
A. Andersson (Perjus) – 85:32	3–2

8 min
Penalties
8 min
38
Shots
39

10 March 2024; 12:05	Brynäs IF	0–2 (0–0, 0–2, 0–0)	MoDo Hockey	Monitor ERP Arena, Gävle; Attendance: 976

Klára Peslarová	Goalies	Andrea Brändli	Referees: Ida Henriksson; Anna Hammar; Linesmen: Jessica Lundgren; Hanna Öberg
0–1 / 23:57 – Klimek; 0–2 / 32:16 – Klimek (Šapovalivová)			Referees: Ida Henriksson; Anna Hammar; Linesmen: Jessica Lundgren; Hanna Öberg
6 min	Penalties	4 min	Referees: Ida Henriksson; Anna Hammar; Linesmen: Jessica Lundgren; Hanna Öberg
24	Shots	21	Referees: Ida Henriksson; Anna Hammar; Linesmen: Jessica Lundgren; Hanna Öberg

=== Finals ===
The Swedish Championship finals began on Friday, 15 March and Luleå HF/MSSK were named the 2024 SDHL champion on Tuesday, 19 March. Home game advantage was granted to Luleå HF, the higher seeded team, for the second and third games of the series.

==== Luleå vs. MoDo ====
All times local, Central European Time (UTC+1)

15 March 2024; 18:05	MoDo Hockey	1–4 (0–2, 1–0, 0–2)	Luleå HF/MSSK	Hägglunds Arena, Örnsköldsvik; Attendance: 2,871

Andrea Brändli
Goalies
Sara Grahn
Referees:
Markus Yngvesson
Anna Hammar
Linesmen:
Ottilia Classon
Simon Lindberg

	0–1	00:44 – Savolainen
	0–2	05:29 – Pirttijärvi (Nieminen)
Ljungblom (Sundin) – 23:57	1–2
	1–3	51:59 – Kjellbin
	1–4	57:08 – Nordin (Nieminen, Pirttijärvi) (SH, EN)

2 min
Penalties
4 min
21
Shots
40

17 March 2024; 15:05	Luleå HF/MSSK	4–1 (2–0, 0–0, 2–1)	MoDo Hockey	Coop Norrbotten Arena, Luleå; Attendance: 2,779

Sara Grahn
Goalies
Andrea Brändli
Referees:
Ida Henriksson
Ludwig Gran
Linesmen:
Jessica Lundgren
Josef Lundgren

Nieminen (Pirttijärvi, Nordin) – 05:25	1–0
Nordin (Nieminen, Kjellbin) – 13:07	2–0
	2–1	55:23 – Hallin (Seitz, Savander)
Nieminen – 56:31	3–1
Nieminen (Nordin, Lin. Johansson) – 56:51	4–1

4 min
Penalties
8 min
33
Shots
15

19 March 2024; 18:05	Luleå HF/MSSK	4–2 (1–0, 2–1, 1–1)	MoDo Hockey	Coop Norrbotten Arena, Luleå; Attendance: 5,850

Sara Grahn
Goalies
Andrea Brändli
Referees:
Ida Henriksson
Anna Hammar
Linesmen:
Ottilia Classon
Jessica Lundgren

Kjellbin (Nieminen) – 02:08	1–0
	1–1	23:49 – Šapovalivová (Hedqvist, Savander)
Nieminen – 25:28	2–1
Lin. Johansson (Lis. Johansson, Kjellbin) – 38:59	3–1
	3–2	49:34 – Sundin (Seitz)
Hiirikoski (EN) – 58:16	4–2

4 min
Penalties
6 min
42
Shots
16

== Qualification ==
The final round of the SDHL qualification series (Kvalserie till SDHL) began on 6 March and concluded on 10 March. Prior to the finals, Dam HockeyAllsvenskan teams participated in quarterfinal and semifinal rounds to determine the two teams that would challenge the bottom ranked teams of the SDHL for league placement.

=== Finals ===
==== HV71 vs. Södertälje ====
7 March 2024; 19:00	Södertälje SK	2–8 (1–3, 0–3, 1–2)	HV71	Scaniarinken, Södertälje; Attendance: 523

Lovisa Berndtsson
Nicole Jackson
Goalies
Lina van Noort
Referees:
Veronica Lovensnö
Fredrik Engert
Linesmen:
Wilma Westlund
Thea Enström

	0–1	03:02 – E. Svensson (SH)
Björgvinsdóttir (Attea, Forsberg) (PP) – 03:31	1–1
	1–2	13:52 – Montonen (Raunio)
	1–3	18:56 – E. Svensson (Jungåker, Armborg) (PP)
	1–4	23:42 – Jungåker (Raunio) (PP)
	1–5	25:24 – E. Svensson (H. Svensson, Yrjänen)
	1–6	29:04 – Yrjänen (H. Svensson)
McDonald (Curlett, Mosher) (PP) – 43:05	2–6
	2–7	54:31 – Yrjänen
	2–8	54:56 – Rakkolainen (Raunio, Käyhkö)

8 min
Penalties
8 min
25
Shots
50

10 March 2024; 16:00	HV71	2–1 OT (0–0, 1–1, 0–0) (OT: 1–0)	Södertälje SK	Husqvarna Garden, Jönköping; Attendance: 420

Lina van Noort
Goalies
Nicole Jackson
Referees:
David Gustafsson
Robin Werner
Linesmen:
Filip Johansson
Colin Johansson

	0–1	20:59 – Pren (Björgvinsdóttir, Mosher)
Yrjänen (E. Svensson, Armborg) – 29:05	1–1
H. Svensson (E. Svensson, Armborg) – 60:12	2–1

2 min
Penalties
6 min
40
Shots
24

==== AIK vs. Skellefteå AIK ====
6 March 2024; 19:00	Skellefteå AIK	2–1 OT (0–0, 1–1, 0–0) (OT: 1–0)	AIK	Skellefteå Kraft Arena, Skellefteå; Attendance: 2,649

Miranda Dahlgren
Goalies
Blanka Škodová
Referees:
Mikael Lockner
Robin Byström
Linesmen:
Lars Bjurman
Jonathan Wirtala

	0–1	24:01 – Leijonhielm (Alasalmi)
Jókai-Szilágyi (Grahn, Viklund) – 35:27	1–1
Grahn (Jókai-Szilágyi) – 73:31	2–1

4 min
Penalties
10 min
55
Shots
53

9 March 2024; 15:30	AIK	1–3 (1–1, 0–0, 0–2)	Skellefteå AIK	Ritorps Ishall, Solna

Blanka Škodová
Goalies
Miranda Dahlgren
Referees:
Fredrik Engert
Andreas Wikström
Linesmen:
Thea Enström
Oskar Kuoppala

	0–1	01:46 – Lerchová (Bjurvén, Benjamin) (PP2)
Dýcková (Brown, Yamashita) – 03:40	1–1
	1–2	46:42 – Mogren (Søndergaard Jensen, Krausneck)
	1–3	49:31 – Krausneck (Forsgren)

6 min
Penalties
4 min
32
Shots
27

== Awards and honors ==
=== Monthly awards ===
==== Player of the Month ====
The SDHL player of the month (Swedish: månadens spelare) is selected by a jury comprising SDHL sports director Oscar Alsenfelt, Svenska Spel sponsorship manager Mats Einarsson, SVT sports commentator Chris Härenstam, and Damkronorna head coach Ulf "Uffe" Lundberg; TV4 ice hockey commentator Apollonia Mälarberg voted as part of the jury for December, January, and February and Pernilla Winberg of TV4 voted as part of the jury for September/October. Each winner selected a project to receive 10,000kr towards promoting Swedish ice hockey. Winners are listed with their selected programs in parentheses.

- September/October 2023: Haruka Toko, Linköping HC (Linköping HC girls' ice hockey program)
- November 2023: Klára Peslarová, Brynäs IF (En Bra Start)
- December 2023: Lina Ljungblom, MoDo Hockey (Skövde IK girls' ice hockey program)
- January 2024: Noora Tulus, Luleå HF/MSSK (Luleå Hockey girls' ice hockey program)
- February 2024: Stephanie Neatby, Frölunda HC (Frölunda HC girls' ice hockey program)

==== Delivery of the Month ====
The SDHL assist of the month award is called the "delivery of the month" (Swedish: "månadens leverans") due to its sponsorship by shipping company DHL. Each winner earns 5000kr for a project of their choice that promotes Swedish ice hockey. Winners are listed with their selected programs in parentheses.

- September 2023: Klára Seroiszková, HV71
- October 2023: unknown
- November 2023: Sara Hjalmarsson, Linköping HC (Linköping HC girls' ice hockey program)
- December 2023: Lina Ljungblom, MoDo (MoDo Hockey girls' ice hockey program)
- January 2024: Hanna Thuvik, Brynäs IF (Rönnängs IK girls' ice hockey program)

=== Weekly Awards ===
==== Goal of the Week ====
The SDHL goal of the week (Swedish: Veckans mål) is selected by fan vote from five candidates via the league’s website and social media accounts. Percentage of votes cast for the winner is in parentheses, when available.

October 2023

- Week 1: Tea Løkke Nyberg, HV71 (44.4%)
- Week 2: Emilia Vesa, Frölunda HC (34.2%)
- Week 3: Petra Nieminen, Luleå/MSSK (29.8%)
- Week 4: Julia Perjus, MoDo Hockey (51.5%)

December 2023

- Week 1: Emilia Vesa, Frölunda HC (64.8%)
- Week 2: Tereza Radová, Leksands IF (68.6%)
- Week 3: Holiday break, none selected
- Week 4: Tatum Amy, Leksands IF (>72%)

February 2024

- Week 1: Michelle Karvinen, Frölunda HC (76.2%)
- Week 2: unknown
- Week 3: Liliane Perreault, Frölunda HC (53.5%)
- Week 4: Aino Karppinen, Leksands IF (55.9%)

November 2023

- Week 1: Lore Baudrit, Leksands IF (62.2%)
- Week 2: Noora Tulus, Luleå/MSSK (45.5%)
- Week 3: Edit Danielsson, Frölunda HC (59.6%)
- Week 4: Edit Danielsson, Frölunda HC (57.3%)

January 2024

- Week 1: Liliane Perreault, Frölunda HC (89.2%)
- Week 2: Michelle Karvinen, Frölunda HC (69.6%)
- Week 3: Malia Schneider, Brynäs IF (34.6%)
- Week 4: Felizia Wikner Zienkiewicz, Frölunda HC (52%)

==== Save of the Week ====
The SDHL save of the week (Swedish: Veckans räddning) is selected from five candidates by fan vote via the league’s website and social media accounts. Percentage of votes cast for the winner is in parentheses, when available.

October 2023

- Week 1: Ebba Svensson Träff, Linköping HC
- Week 2: Stephanie Neatby, Frölunda HC (60.8%)
- Week 3: Ellen Jonsson, Leksands IF (40.8%)
- Week 4: Ellen Jonsson, Leksands IF (47.7%)

December 2023

- Week 1: Ebba Svensson Träff, Linköping HC (57.7%)
- Week 2: Ida Boman, Djurgårdens IF (42.5%)
- Week 3: Holiday break, none selected
- Week 4: Stephanie Neatby, Frölunda HC (>81%)

February 2024

- Week 1: Ebba Svensson Träff, Linköping HC (70.8%)
- Week 2: unknown
- Week 3: Ebba Svensson Träff, Linköping HC (85.3%)
- Week 4: Ebba Svensson Träff, Linköping HC (60.4%)

November 2023

- Week 1: Lina Van Noort, HV71 (46.7%)
- Week 2: Maja Helge, Frölunda HC (84.2%)
- Week 3: Maja Helge, Frölunda HC (42.5%)
- Week 4: Stephanie Neatby, Frölunda HC (81.2%)

January 2024

- Week 1: Blanka Škodová, AIK Hockey (42.7%)
- Week 2: Ellen Jonsson, Leksands IF (44.8%)
- Week 3: Ebba Svensson Träff, Linköping HC (63.6%)
- Week 4: Emma Polusny, Leksands IF (38.6%)
