= 2022–23 SDHL season =

16th ice hockey season of the SDHL

- League: SDHL
- Sport: Ice hockey
- Duration: 16 September 2022 – 26 February 2023
- Games: 32
- Teams: 10

Regular Season
- Season champions: Luleå HF/MSSK
- Runners-up: Brynäs IF
- Minor premiers: Frölunda HC
- Top scorer: Lara Stalder (Brynäs)

Playoffs
- Champions: Luleå HF/MSSK
- Runners-up: Brynäs IF

SDHL seasons
- 2021–22 2023–24

The 2022–23 SDHL season was the sixteenth ice hockey season of the Swedish Women's Hockey League (SDHL). The season began on 16 September 2022 and concluded on 26 February 2023. Göteborg HC withdrew from the league on 2 November 2022, reducing the number of teams to nine for the remainder of the regular season. This season saw the SDHL become the first significant women's hockey league to allow bodychecking.

The playoffs began on 1 March and concluded on 20 March 2023. Luleå HF/MSSK swept Brynäs IF Dam in the playoff finals to claim the club's sixth Swedish Championship title.

== Teams ==
Location of SDHL teams in Sweden

All ten teams from the 2021–22 SDHL season returned for the 2022–23 season. The increasing number of import players was reflected in the nationalities of team captains: AIK, Brynäs IF, HV71, and Luleå HF/MSSK had Finnish captains; Göteborg HC, Leksands IF, and SDE HF had Canadian captains; Linköping had a Norwegian captain; and Djurgårdens and MoDo had Swedish captains.

On 2 November 2022, Göteborg HC announced its withdrawal from the league. The club opted to withdraw in an effort to avoid declaring bankruptcy, which would have also required the cessation of all of the club’s minor, junior, and para ice hockey activities. In addition to the club’s financial problems, the team had also failed to attract enough Swedish players to meet SDHL requirements.

Team	City	Arena	Head coach	Captain
AIK	Solna	Ritorps Ishall	Carl Wendt	Sara Säkkinen
Brynäs IF	Gävle	Monitor ERP Arena	Filip Eriksson	Rosa Lindstedt
Djurgårdens IF	Stockholm	Hovet	Rickard Hårdstam	Josefine Holmgren
~~Göteborg HC~~	Gothenburg	Angered Arena	Snorri Sigurbergsson	Alexa McMillan
HV71	Jönköping	Husqvarna Garden	Peter Hammarström	Sanni Hakala
Leksands IF	Leksand	Tegera Arena	Jordan Colliton	Abby Thiessen
Linköping HC	Linköping	Stångebro Ishall	Simon Hedefalk	Madelen Haug Hansen
Luleå HF/MSSK	Luleå	Coop Norrbotten Arena	Jens Själin, ~~Mikael Forsberg~~	Jenni Hiirikoski
MoDo Hockey	Örnsköldsvik	Hägglunds Arena	Jared Cipparone	Olivia Carlsson
SDE Hockey	Danderyd	Enebybergs Ishall	Jan Bylesjö	Kelly Murray

== Regular season ==
The 2022–23 SDHL season schedule originally comprised 36 games per team, in which each team would play every other team four times – twice at home and twice away.

=== Standings ===
When Göteborg HC withdrew from the league in early November, they had earned four points in thirteen games and was ranked last in the league. Their record included one win, one overtime loss, and eleven regulation losses, with a goal difference of –52 (8 goals for, 60 goals against).

In order to maintain an equal number of games played between the remaining nine teams, the SDHL selected to remove the games played by Göteborg HC from the official standings, reducing the number of games played by each team to 32 for the season. All statistics from games played against Göteborg HC were stricken from the record.

Pos	Team	Pld	W	OTW	OTL	L	GF	GA	GD	Pts
1	Luleå HF/MSSK	32	27	3	0	2	140	39	+101	87
2	Brynäs IF	32	24	3	1	4	136	66	+70	79
3	Djurgårdens IF	32	17	1	4	10	83	69	+14	57
4	MoDo Hockey	32	15	4	3	10	91	74	+17	56
5	SDE Hockey	32	10	2	7	13	74	88	−14	41
6	Leksands IF	32	9	2	6	15	60	89	−29	37
7	Linköping HC	32	6	7	2	17	69	97	−28	34
8	HV71	32	4	5	2	21	67	115	−48	24
9	AIK IF	32	4	1	3	24	44	127	−83	17
10	Göteborg HC	0	0	0	0	0	0	0	0	0

Updated to match(es) played on 26 February 2023. Source: Svenska Ishockeyförbundet

Luleå HF/MSSK were champions of the regular season after amassing a combined total of thirty wins and two losses.

=== Statistics ===
==== Scoring leaders ====
The following players lead the league in regular season points at the completion of the season on 26 February 2023.

Player	Team	GP	G	A	Pts	+/–	PIM
Lara Stalder	Brynäs	32	18	43	61	+38	16
Noora Tulus	Luleå/MSSK	32	22	34	56	+43	6
Petra Nieminen	Luleå/MSSK	32	30	23	53	+38	20
Anna Meixner	Brynäs	30	26	27	53	+39	12
Maja Nylén Persson	Brynäs	32	16	32	48	+43	8
Viivi Vainikka	Luleå/MSSK	32	23	18	41	+38	6
Jennifer Wakefield	MoDo	28	23	14	37	+22	26
Jenni Hiirikoski	Luleå/MSSK	31	5	32	37	+43	15
Emma Nordin	Luleå/MSSK	30	17	19	36	+22	2
Ronja Savolainen	Luleå/MSSK	30	7	25	32	+51	14
Nara Elia	Linköping	30	17	13	30	+1	4
Lina Ljungblom	MoDo	32	17	13	30	+12	8
Hanna Thuvik	Brynäs	28	15	14	29	+26	31
Michelle Löwenhielm	SDE	31	11	18	29	+10	14
Josefine Jakobsen	Djurgården	30	9	20	29	+9	22
Jaycee Magwood	MoDo	32	5	24	29	+13	18
Matilda Nilsson	Brynäs	27	16	12	28	+16	8
Elin Svensson	HV71	32	13	14	27	–13	26
Lisa Johansson	Luleå/MSSK	31	12	15	27	+23	6
Haruka Toko	Linköping	29	9	18	27	+1	6

==== Leading goaltenders ====
The following goaltenders led the league in save percentage at the conclusion of the regular season on 26 February 2023, while playing at least one third of their team’s minutes in net.

Player	Team	GP	TOI	W	L	GA	SO	SV%	GAA
Frida Axell	Luleå/MSSK	14	842:41	13	1	14	6	94.42	1.00
Lindsey Post	SDE	21	1204:50	11	10	37	6	93.76	1.84
Sara Grahn	Luleå/MSSK	18	1086:24	17	1	25	3	92.80	1.38
Lauren Bench	MoDo	26	1521:17	14	12	58	3	91.88	2.29
Felicia Frank	Brynäs	13	713:22	11	1	22	3	91.57	1.85
Anni Keisala	HV71	26	1481:12	8	16	72	3	91.49	2.92
Loryn Pearson Porter	Göteborg/ Brynäs	21	1119:00	8	11	63	2	90.7	3.38
Emma Polusny	Leksand	27	1620:07	11	16	65	4	90.57	2.41
Ida Boman	Djurgården	25	1475:59	14	11	51	3	90.56	2.07
Ebba Svensson Träff	Linköping	23	1306:27	8	15	60	2	90.48	2.76

== Playoffs ==
=== Bracket ===
Quarterfinals
1	Luleå HF/MSSK	2
8	HV71	0
4	MoDo Hockey	2
5	SDE HF	0
2	Brynäs IF	2
7	Linköping	0
3	Djurgårdens IF	2
6	Leksands IF	1

Semifinals
1	Luleå HF/MSSK	3
4	MoDo Hockey	0
2	Brynäs IF	3
3	Djurgårdens IF	0

Finals
1st place, gold medalist(s)	Luleå HF/MSSK	3
2nd place, silver medalist(s)	Brynäs IF	0

== Awards and honors ==
Austrian forward Anna Meixner of Brynäs IF received the Guldhjälmen for the 2022–23 SDHL season. First awarded in the 2019–20 SDHL season, Guldhjälmen recognizes the SDHL MVP, as voted by the league’s players. Meixner is the third Brynäs player to receive the award, after Lara Stalder in 2019–20 and Kateřina Mrázová in 2020–21.

=== Player of the Month ===
The SDHL player of the month (Swedish: månadens spelare) was selected by a jury comprising SDHL sports director Oscar Alsenfelt, Svenska Spel sponsorship manager Mats Einarsson, SVT sports commentator Chris Härenstam, C More ice hockey commentator Pernilla Winberg, and Damkronorna head coach Ulf "Uffe" Lundberg; every jury member was not required vote each month. Each winner selected a project to receive 10,000kr towards promoting Swedish ice hockey. Winners are listed with their selected programs in parentheses.

- September/October 2022: Noora Tulus, Luleå/MSSK (Luleå Hockey girls' program)
- November 2022: Emma Nordin, Luleå/MSSK (Luleå Hockey girls' ice skating disco)
- December 2022: Maja Nylén Persson, Brynäs (Brynäs girls' ice hockey program)
- January 2023: Anna Meixner, Brynäs (Brynäs girls' ice hockey program)
- February 2023: Petra Nieminen, Luleå/MSSK (Luleå Hockey girls' program)

=== Delivery of the Month ===
The SDHL assist of the month award was dubbed the "delivery of the month" (Swedish: "månadens leverans") due to its sponsorship by the shipping company DHL. Each winner earned 5000kr for a non-profit of their choice. Winners are listed with their selected non-profit in parentheses.

- October 2022: Nara Elia, Linköping (unspecified organization promoting girls ice hockey in Sweden)
- November 2022: Lova Blom, Djurgårdens (Nyköping Hockey girls junior-C team and hockey school)
- January 2023: Lara Stalder, Brynäs (Brynäs/Sandvikens NDHL team)
- February 2023: Lara Stalder, Brynäs (Brynäs/Sandvikens NDHL team)

=== Weekly Awards ===
Goal of the Week
The SDHL goal of the week (Swedish: Veckans mål) was selected by fan vote from five nominees via the league’s website and social media accounts. Percentage of votes cast for the winner is in parentheses, when available.

- Week 37, 2022: Karoline Pedersen, HV71 (44%)
- Week 38, 2022: Maya Nylén Persson, Brynäs
- Week 39, 2022: Linnéa Johansson, Linköping
- Week 40, 2022: Viivi Vainikka, Luleå/MSSK
- Week 41, 2022: Julie Zwarthoed, SDE (57%)
- Week 42, 2022: Victoria Klimek, Leksand (29%) (Note: Haruka Toko of Linköping received a total of 38% of votes in Week 42. She had two goals nominated, which received 28% and 10% of the vote, respectively.)
- Week 43, 2022: Mathea Fischer, SDE (48%)
- Week 44, 2022: Anna Meixner, Brynäs (66%)
- Week 46, 2022: Fanny Brolin, Leksand (78%)
- Week 47, 2022: Isabelle Leijonhielm, AIK
- Week 48, 2022: Fanny Brolin, Leksand (56%)
- Week 49, 2022: Anna Purschke, Leksands (37%)
- Week 52, 2022: Kelly Murray, SDE
- Week 1, 2023: Josefine Persson, Luleå/MSSK
- Week 2 & 3, 2023: Felizia Wikner-Zienkiewicz, Brynäs
- Week 4, 2023: Kayleigh Hamers, SDE (38%)
- Week 5, 2023: Wilma Johansson, Leksand (74%)
- Week 7, 2023: Mira Markström, HV71
- Week 8, 2023: Kiira Yrjänen, HV71

Save of the Week
The SDHL save of the week (Swedish: Veckans räddning) was selected from five options by fan vote via the league’s website and social media accounts. Percentage of votes cast for the winner is in parentheses, when available.

- Week 37, 2022: Nicole Jackson, Göteborg
- Week 38, 2022: Loryn Pearson Porter, Göteborg
- Week 39, 2022: Mariah Fujimagari, AIK
- Week 40, 2022: Lindsey Post, SDE
- Week 41, 2022: Mariah Fujimagari, AIK
- Week 42, 2022: Mariah Fujimagari, AIK (54%)
- Week 43, 2022: Klára Peslarová, Brynäs (28%)
- Week 44, 2022: Sabina Eriksson, Linköping (61%)
- Week 46, 2022: Felicia Frank, Brynäs (41%)
- Week 47, 2022: Lindsey Post, SDE (65%)
- Week 48, 2022: Felicia Frank, Brynäs (39%)
- Week 49, 2022: Felicia Frank, Brynäs
- Week 52, 2022: Mariah Fujimagari, AIK
- Week 1, 2023: Ebba Svensson Träff, Linköping
- Week 2 & 3, 2023: Mariah Fujimagari, AIK
- Week 4, 2023: Lindsey Post, SDE
- Week 6, 2023: Ebba Svensson Träff, Linköping
- Week 7, 2023: Ebba Svensson Träff, Linköping
- Week 8, 2023: Anni Keisala, HV71
