= Ronja Savolainen =

Finnish ice hockey player (born 1997)

- Born: 29 November 1997 (age 28) Helsinki, Finland
- Height: 1.78 m (5 ft 10 in)
- Weight: 72 kg (159 lb; 11 st 5 lb)
- Position: Defence
- Shoots: Left
- PWHL team Former teams: Ottawa Charge; Luleå HF/MSSK; Espoo Blues; KJT Kerava
- National team: Finland
- Playing career: 2013–present
Medal record
Olympic Games
| Bronze medal – third place | 2018 Pyeongchang | Ice hockey |
| Bronze medal – third place | 2022 Beijing | Ice hockey |
World Championship
| Silver medal – second place | 2019 Finland |
| Bronze medal – third place | 2015 Sweden |
| Bronze medal – third place | 2017 United States |
| Bronze medal – third place | 2021 Canada |
| Bronze medal – third place | 2024 United States |
| Bronze medal – third place | 2025 Czechia |

Ronja Savolainen (born 29 November 1997) is a Finnish ice hockey defender for the Ottawa Charge of the Professional Women's Hockey League (PWHL) and member of the Finnish national ice hockey team. She was drafted eighth overall by the Charge in the 2024 PWHL draft and signed a three-year contract with the club in September 2024.

== Playing career ==
As a child, Savolainen played in the youth department of Itä-Helsingin Kiekko (IHK) in her home city of Helsinki, first playing forward before switching to defence in her early teens. At age 14, she played with a high-level boys' team but was nearly driven to quit hockey after being bullied by her teammates because they felt "girls should not play hockey."

During the 2012–13 season, she played junior ice hockey with the men's under-16 team of East Hockey Club (EHC) Red Devil of the U16 Suomi-sarja. She made her senior women's debut with Lohjan Kisa-Veikot (LoKV) of the Naisten Mestis.

The following season, at the age of 16, she began playing in the Naisten SM-sarja (renamed Auroraliiga in 2024) with KJT Kerava. The team had an average age of just 19 years, and its roster featured several future national team players, including Matilda Nilsson, Emmi Rakkolainen, and Noora Tulus. Savolainen scored six points in seven games during her rookie season, adding another thirteen points in eight relegation playoff games to keep the team in the top flight.

She signed with the Espoo Blues, the dominant force in the Nisten SM-sarja, ahead of the 2014–15 season. In her first regular season with the Blues, she scored six goals and 20 assists for 26 points in 25 games and notched two assists in five playoff games. The season culminated with Savolainen's first and the Blues' thirteenth Aurora Borealis Cup victory. She remained with the Blues through the 2015–16 season, posting sixteen points in 26 regular season games.

=== SDHL ===
In 2016, she signed in the Swedish Women's Hockey League (SDHL) with Luleå HF/MSSK in Sweden, joining several other Finnish national team stars on the team.

She began the 2018–19 season with a 16-game goalless streak that was finally broken when she scored a hat-trick against Göteborg HC at the end of November. She finished the season with ten goals and 29 points. After Luleå beat Linköping in the fourth game of the playoff finals, forcing a game five coming back from a 2–0 series deficit, she caused a minor health scare when she celebrated so hard that she fainted on the ice. About the incident, she later shared, "I don't think I've ever been that happy before. It was very nice." Luleå won the decisive game, and Savolainen picked up her second SDHL championship title.

In the 2019–20 SDHL season, she set career bests in goals and points, scoring 20 goals and 41 points, leading all defenders in goals and finishing second among defenders in points. Luleå made it to the championship finals for the third year in a row before the season was canceled due to the COVID-19 pandemic in Sweden. And she was named a finalist for the SDHL Defender of the Year.

During a game against AIK IF in early October 2020, she had to be taken to the hospital emergency ward after her leg was cut by another player's skate. She missed one match due to the injury. In November 2020, along with four other Finnish national team and Luleå teammates, she forced to miss several SDHL games while being quarantined under Finnish law after a national team camp where a player tested positive for COVID-19.

Her contract with Luleå HF/MSSK expired in April 2024 and she opted to become a free agent rather than re-sign with the team.

=== PWHL ===
On 10 June 2024, Savolainen was drafted eighth overall by the Ottawa Charge (called PWHL Ottawa at that time) in the 2024 draft of the Professional Women's Hockey League (PWHL). She signed a three-year deal with the club on 25 September 2024, describing the contract as "a dream come true."

== International play ==
Savolainen made her IIHF World Championship debut at the 2015 IIHF Women's World Championship and has since represented Finland at the World Championships in 2016, 2017, 2019, 2021, 2022, 2023, 2024, and 2025.

She scored the game-winning goal in Finland's first-ever round-robin victory over Canada at the 2017 IIHF Women's World Championship.

Savolainen was part of the historic silver medal-winning Finnish team at the 2019 IIHF Women's World Championship, the first team to unseat either the United States or Canada from their perennial lock on World Championship gold and silver. She scored twice and wasn't issued a single penalty minute, despite averaging over 23 minutes of ice time per game. She scored twice and notched an assist in the semi-final match against Canada, participating in three of the four goals in the historic Finnish victory. After teammate Petra Nieminen's game-winning goal was controversially overturned, Savolainen was one of five Finnish players to take a shot on American netminder Alex Rigsby Cavallini in the shootout that resulted in the United States' fifth consecutive World Championship gold.

Savolainen was selected as a top-three player for Finland by the coaches after scoring four goals and four assists for eight points across seven games at the 2023 World Championship.

On 2 January 2026, she was named to Finland's roster to compete at the 2026 Winter Olympics.

== Personal life ==
Savolainen was diagnosed with dyslexia and ADHD when she was in primary school. Her ADHD diagnosis was not a surprise to her parents, as her father, Janne, also has ADHD. In March 2020, she chose to speak publicly about her neurodiversity, crediting her girlfriend, Swedish national team player Anna Kjellbin, with encouraging her to be open about her diagnoses.

Along with Finnish national team players Noora Räty and Meeri Räisänen, she has partnered with menstrual cup company Lunette to break the taboo surrounding menstruation in women's sports. She has worked with Luleå teammate Rebecca Stenberg to create a YouTube channel about daily life in the SDHL.

Savolainen spoke out in support of the 2019 Sweden women's national ice hockey team strike, stating that "it was very brave of every single girl who stood behind it" and that she hoped for Sweden to return to the top IIHF division soon. Her solidarity was criticized by the Swedish Ice Hockey Association's competition director, who suggested she find another league to in which to play.

After a Unionen report, released in January 2020, found that the average top-flight men's hockey player in Sweden earns more than the combined salaries for an entire SDHL team, she stated that "I didn't know [the fucking difference] was so big. It sucks. I'm pissed." After the 2020 IIHF Women's World Championship was canceled due to the COVID-19 pandemic, she was among several Finnish national team players who had to seek a second job since they did not receive the usual stipend for playing in the World Championships.

Savolainen got engaged to Swedish National Team and Montreal Victoire defenceman Anna Kjellbin in 2024. The couple met while playing in the SDHL and began dating in 2019.

== Career statistics ==
=== Regular season and playoffs ===
| | | | Regular Season | | | | | Playoffs |
| Season | Team | League | GP | G | A | Pts | PIM | GP | G | A | Pts | PIM |
|---|---|---|---|---|---|---|---|---|---|---|---|---|
| 2013-14 | KJT | NSMs | 7 | 3 | 3 | 6 | 6 | - | - | - | - | - |
| 2014-15 | Espoo Blues | NSMs | 25 | 6 | 20 | 26 | 24 | 5 | 0 | 2 | 2 | 10 |
| 2015-16 | Espoo Blues | NSMs | 26 | 4 | 12 | 16 | 10 | 6 | 0 | 1 | 1 | 0 |
| 2016-17 | Luleå HF/MSSK | SDHL | 31 | 11 | 14 | 25 | 26 | 4 | 0 | 0 | 0 | 2 |
| 2017-18 | Luleå HF/MSSK | SDHL | 34 | 5 | 18 | 23 | 34 | 7 | 2 | 2 | 4 | 8 |
| 2018-19 | Luleå HF/MSSK | SDHL | 34 | 10 | 19 | 29 | 40 | 11 | 5 | 2 | 7 | 12 |
| 2019-20 | Luleå HF/MSSK | SDHL | 36 | 20 | 21 | 41 | 49 | 6 | 1 | 0 | 1 | 8 |
| 2020-21 | Luleå HF/MSSK | SDHL | 33 | 11 | 19 | 30 | 52 | 9 | 3 | 3 | 6 | 10 |
| 2021-22 | Luleå HF/MSSK | SDHL | 25 | 6 | 12 | 18 | 36 | 12 | 3 | 2 | 5 | 14 |
| 2022-23 | Luleå HF/MSSK | SDHL | 30 | 7 | 25 | 32 | 14 | 8 | 1 | 7 | 8 | 6 |
| 2023-24 | Luleå HF/MSSK | SDHL | 35 | 11 | 18 | 29 | 20 | 7 | 2 | 3 | 5 | 6 |
| 2024–25 | Ottawa Charge | PWHL | 28 | 2 | 9 | 11 | 18 | 8 | 0 | 1 | 1 | 6 |
| 2025–26 | Ottawa Charge | PWHL | 30 | 4 | 6 | 10 | 10 | 8 | 2 | 2 | 4 | 4 |
| SDHL totals | | | 258 | 81 | 146 | 227 | 271 | 64 | 17 | 19 | 36 | 66 |
| Naisten SM-sarja totals | | | 58 | 13 | 35 | 48 | 46 | 11 | 0 | 3 | 3 | 10 |
| PWHL totals | | | 58 | 6 | 15 | 21 | 28 | 16 | 2 | 3 | 5 | 10 |

=== International ===
| Year | Team | Event | Result | GP | G | A | Pts | PIM |
|---|---|---|---|---|---|---|---|---|
| 2014 | Finland | U18 | 5th | 5 | 0 | 1 | 1 | 0 |
| 2015 | Finland | U18 | 5th | 5 | 2 | 1 | 3 | 4 |
| 2015 | Finland | WC | 3rd place, bronze medalist(s) | 6 | 0 | 0 | 0 | 4 |
| 2016 | Finland | WC | 4th | 6 | 1 | 1 | 2 | 8 |
| 2017 | Finland | WC | 3rd place, bronze medalist(s) | 6 | 2 | 0 | 2 | 4 |
| 2018 | Finland | OG | 3rd place, bronze medalist(s) | 6 | 0 | 1 | 1 | 4 |
| 2019 | Finland | WC | 2nd place, silver medalist(s) | 7 | 2 | 1 | 3 | 0 |
| 2021 | Finland | WC | 3rd place, bronze medalist(s) | 7 | 0 | 1 | 1 | 2 |
| 2022 | Finland | OG | 3rd place, bronze medalist(s) | 7 | 0 | 2 | 2 | 2 |
| 2022 | Finland | WC | 6th | 6 | 1 | 1 | 2 | 8 |
| 2023 | Finland | WC | 5th | 7 | 4 | 4 | 8 | 4 |
| 2024 | Finland | WC | 3rd place, bronze medalist(s) | 7 | 1 | 1 | 2 | 6 |
| 2025 | Finland | WC | 3rd place, bronze medalist(s) | 7 | 3 | 3 | 6 | 0 |
| 2026 | Finland | OG | 6th | 5 | 0 | 0 | 0 | 2 |
| Junior totals | | | | 10 | 2 | 2 | 4 | 4 |
| Senior totals | | | | 77 | 14 | 15 | 29 | 44 |
