= Andrea Brändli =

Swiss ice hockey player (born 1997)

- Born: 5 June 1997 (age 29) Wald, Zürich, Switzerland
- Height: 1.69 m (5 ft 7 in)
- Weight: 65 kg (143 lb; 10 st 3 lb)
- Position: Goaltender
- Catches: Left
- SDHL team Former teams: Frölunda HC; MoDo Hockey; SC Weinfelden; EHC Schaffhausen; HC Université Neuchâtel; EHC Bassersdorf; ZSC Lions
- National team: Switzerland
- Playing career: 2010–present
Medal record
Olympic Games
Bronze medal – third place	2026 Milano Cortina	Team

Andrea Brändli (born 5 June 1997) is a Swiss ice hockey player and member of the Swiss national team, currently playing for Frölunda HC of the Swedish Women's Hockey League. She was drafted by the Detroit Clutch in the second round of the 2026 PWHL Draft.

== Playing career ==
=== College ===
Brändli played four seasons at Ohio State University between 2018–19 and 2021–22, appearing in 91 games. She transferred to Boston University in 2022, playing 25 games for the Terriers in 2022–23.

=== Professional ===
Brändli joined MoDo Hockey of the Swedish Women's Hockey League for the 2023–24 season, appearing in 53 regular season games and 15 playoff games over the course of two seasons. She joined Frölunda HC prior to the 2025–26 season.

== International career ==
Brändli first represented Switzerland at the IIHF Women's World Championship in 2017, and was subsequently named to the tournament team in 2019, 2021, 2022, 2023, 2024, and 2025.

Brändli has been named to Team Switzerland for three Olympic Games. She was the third goaltender for Switzerland (behind starter Florence Schelling and backup Janine Alder) in the women's ice hockey tournament at the 2018 Winter Olympics, though she did not play any games. She also played for Team Switzerland at the 2022 Winter Olympics, appearing in seven games.

Brändli was named as the starting goaltender for Team Switzerland ahead of the 2026 Winter Olympics. In the quarterfinal round of the 2026 Winter Olympics, Brändli made 40 saves as Switzerland defeated Finland in a 1–0 final, Gaining the start versus Canada in the semifinals, Brändli became part of Olympic hockey history. Giving up a pair of goals to Marie-Philip Poulin in a 2–1 loss, Poulin surpassed Hayley Wickenheiser for the record of most career Olympic goals. In the bronze medal game versus Sweden, she recorded 31 saves, including 13 in the third period. Switzerland went on to prevail in a 2–1 overtime win. Brändli earned the award for Best Goaltender at the tournament for her performance.

In the 2026 PWHL Draft, she was selected in the second round, 15th overall, by the Detroit Clutch.

== Career statistics ==
=== Regular season and playoffs ===
Note: GP = Games played; Min, TOI = Minutes played; W = Wins; L = Losses; T,T/OT = Ties; OTL = Overtime losses; GA = Goals-against; GAA = Goals-against average; SO = Shutouts; SV% = Save percentage;

			Regular season									Playoffs
Season	Team	League	GP	W	L	T/OT	MIN	GA	SO	GAA	SV%	GP	W	L	MIN	GA	SO	GAA	SV%
2018–19	Ohio State University	WCHA	29	16	10	2	1628:36	51	6	1.88	93.9	—	—	—	—	—	—	—	—
2019–20	Ohio State University	WCHA	31	20	5	5	1807:18	57	4	1.89	92.8	—	—	—	—	—	—	—	—
2020–21	Ohio State University	WCHA	18	11	7	0	1054:20	35	2	1.99	91.5	—	—	—	—	—	—	—	—
2021–22	Ohio State University	WCHA	13	10	3	0	679:30	19	1	1.68	92.7	—	—	—	—	—	—	—	—
2022–23	Boston University	HE	25	7	14	2	1367:18	55	2	2.41	92.8	—	—	—	—	—	—	—	—
2023–24	MoDo Hockey	SDHL	25	16	9	0	1514:10	41	2	1.62	93.7	10	6	4	636:28	21	2	1.98	93.7
2024–25	MoDo Hockey	SDHL	28	18	10	0	1693:37	44	3	1.56	94.2	5	2	3	299:19	11	0	2.21	93.6

=== International ===
Note: GP = Games played; Min, TOI = Minutes played; W = Wins; L = Losses; T,T/OT = Ties; OTL = Overtime losses; GA = Goals-against; GAA = Goals-against average; SO = Shutouts; SV% = Save percentage;

				Regular season
Year	Team	Event	Result	GP	W	L	T/OT	MIN	GA	SO	GAA	SV%
2019	Switzerland	WC	5th	3	0	3	0	179:29	14	0	4.68	91.0
2021	Switzerland	WC	4th	5	0	4	0	209:45	19	0	5.44	90.5
2022	Switzerland	OG	4th	7	2	5	0	349:21	32	0	5.50	88.3
2022	Switzerland	WC	4th	6	2	4	0	298:37	17	0	3.42	89.8
2023	Switzerland	WC	4th	5	2	3	0	298:18	16	0	3.22	91.6
2024	Switzerland	WC	5th	5	1	4	0	280:33	15	0	3.21	92.0
2025	Switzerland	WC	5th	4	0	4	0	200:00	17	0	5.10	87.3
2026	Switzerland	OG	3rd place, bronze medalist(s)	4	2	2	0	247:51	8	1	1.94	95.3

== Awards and Honors ==
- 2024-25 SDHL Best Goaltender
- 2026 Winter Olympics All-Star Team (as voted by accredited media)
- 2026 Olympics Directorate Award: Best Goaltender
