= Jule Flötgen =

German ice hockey player

- Born: 24 December 1991 (age 33); Dinslaken, Germany
- Height: 1.66 m (5 ft 5 in)
- Weight: 57 kg (126 lb; 9 st 0 lb)
- Position: Goaltender
- Catches: Left
- SDHL team Former teams: Leksands IF; AIK IF; EC Bergkamener Bären; HV71; Göteborg HC; Dinslakener EC
- National team: Germany
- Playing career: 2007–present

Jule Manon Flötgen (born 24 December 1991) is a German ice hockey goaltender and member of the German national ice hockey team, currently playing in the Swedish Women's Hockey League (SDHL) with Leksands IF Dam.

She represented Germany at the 2019 IIHF Women's World Championship. As a junior player with the German national under-18 team, she participated in the 2009 IIHF Women's U18 World Championship.
