= 2024–25 SDHL season =

18th ice hockey season of the SDHL

- League: SDHL
- Sport: Ice hockey
- Duration: 13 September 2024 – 16 February 2025
- Games: 180 (36 per team)
- Teams: 10
- Total attendance: 31127 (426.4 per game)

Regular Season
- Season champions: Luleå HF/MSSK
- Runners-up: Frölunda HC
- Top scorer: (Finland) Petra Nieminen, Luleå HF

Playoffs
- Finals champions: Frölunda HC
- Runners-up: Luleå HF/MSSK

SDHL seasons
- 2023–24 2025–26

The 2024–25 SDHL season was the eighteenth ice hockey season of the Swedish Women's Hockey League (SDHL). The regular season began on 13 September 2024 and concluded on 16 February 2025.

== Teams ==
Location of SDHL teams in Sweden

Skellefteå AIK earned promotion to the SDHL after defeating AIK in the 2024 Kvalserie till SDHL (lit. 'Qualifying series for [the] SDHL'). AIK Hockey were subsequently relegated to the Nationella Damhockeyligan (NDHL) after sixteen seasons in the SDHL and two Swedish Championship victories (2009 and 2013).

Team	City	Arena	Head coach	Captain
Brynäs IF	Gävle	Monitor ERP Arena	Filip Eriksson	Maja Nylén Persson
Djurgårdens IF	Stockholm	Hovet	Rickard Hårdstam	Brette Pettet
Frölunda HC	Gothenburg	Frölundaborg	Erika Holst	Hanna Olsson
HV71	Jönköping	Husqvarna Garden	Thomas Pettersen	Elin Svensson
Leksands IF	Leksand	Tegera Arena	Joakim Engström	Courtney Vorster
Linköping HC	Linköping	Saab Arena	Jan Bylesjö	Sara Hjalmarsson
Luleå HF/MSSK	Luleå	Coop Norrbotten Arena	Melinda Olsson	Jenni Hiirikoski
MoDo Hockey	Örnsköldsvik	Hägglunds Arena	Jared Cipparone	Ebba Berglund
SDE Hockey	Danderyd	Enebybergs Ishall	Emelie O'Konor	Mathea Fischer
Skellefteå AIK	Skellefteå	Skellefteå Kraft Arena	Martin Lindh	Malou Berggren

== Preseason ==
The preseason began on 9 August 2024 and concluded on 8 September 2024. It primarily comprised exhibition games played between SDHL teams, though three SDHL teams played a match or more against a team from outside of the league. Participation in the preseason was voluntary and had no bearing on the regular season.

=== Results ===
2024–25 preseason

August
Date	Home	Score	Visitor	OT	Attn	Notes	Recap
9 August	Frölunda	3–1	Czechia U19				
10 August	Frölunda	2–8	Czechia U19				
16 August	MoDo	2–1	Brynäs				
17 August	Frölunda	8–1	HV71		224		
17 August	MoDo	0–2	Luleå		97	Shutout recorded by Frida Axell	
17 August	SDE	4–0	Färjestad BK				
18 August	Linköping	0–3	Djurgårdens		86	Shutout recorded by Ebba Svensson Träff	
20 August	Skellefteå	0–5	Luleå		200	Shutout recorded by Sara Grahn	
20 August	HV71	2–1	Linköping		105		
20 August	SDE	5–1	Djurgårdens				
22 August	Brynäs	5–0	Leksands			Shutout recorded by Ena Nystrøm	
22 August	Linköping	2–5	SDE		20	Hat-trick by Emily Nix	
22 August	MoDo	0–2	Skellefteå		60	Shutout recorded by Camryn Drever	
30 August	HV71	3–1	Norway		40		
31 August	HV71	1–0	Norway		60	Shutout recorded by Lina van Noort	

September
Date	Home	Score	Visitor	OT	Attn	Notes	Recap
4 September	Brynäs	0–1	Djurgårdens		146	Shutout recorded by Ida Boman	
4 September	Skellefteå	1–2	MoDo				
6 September	Linköping	0–5	Frölunda		60		
6 September	Luleå	3–2	Skellefteå	OT			
7 September	Brynäs	0–2	MoDo		81	Shutout recorded by Andrea Brändli	
7 September	HV71	1–3	SDE		60		
8 September	Leksands	2–3	Djurgårdens		70		
8 September	Frölunda	5–4	Linköping	OT			

== Regular season ==
The regular season began on Friday, 13 September 2024 and is scheduled to conclude on Sunday, 16 February 2025.

=== Standings ===
Pos	Team	Pld	W	OTW	OTL	L	GF	GA	GD	Pts
1	Luleå HF	36	25	3	2	6	130	51	+79	83
2	Frölunda HC	36	21	5	3	7	124	72	+52	76
3	MoDo Hockey	36	19	5	4	8	98	64	+34	71
4	Brynäs IF	36	14	7	1	14	101	91	+10	57
5	Djurgårdens IF	36	17	0	5	14	78	65	+13	56
6	SDE HF	36	13	6	5	12	90	86	+4	56
7	Linköping HC	36	14	2	3	17	63	88	−25	49
8	Skellefteå AIK	36	12	1	8	15	66	104	−38	46
9	HV71	36	7	5	3	21	74	119	−45	34
10	Leksands IF	36	4	0	0	32	40	124	−84	12

Updated to match(es) played on 16 February 2025. Source: Svenska Ishockeyförbundet

=== Results ===
2024–25 regular season

September
Date	Home	Score	Visitor	OT	Attn	Notes	Recap
13 September	HV71	1–4	Brynäs		280		
13 September	Linköping	2–1	Skellefteå		178		
13 September	SDE	2–0	Leksands		92	Shutout recorded by Kassidy Sauvé (1)	
13 September	Frölunda	1–2	MoDo		1238		
13 September	Djurgårdens	2–3	Luleå		209		
14 September	HV71	2–4	MoDo		730		
15 September	Frölunda	5–3	Brynäs		373		
15 September	Linköping	1–5	Luleå		215		
15 September	Djurgårdens	1–2	Skellefteå		225		
15 September	Leksands	4–1	SDE		127		
19 September	Djurgårdens	0–1	Linköping	GWS	86	Shutout recorded by Ida Boman (1); Shutout recorded by Ebba Svensson Träff (1)	
20 September	Brynäs	2–1	SDE		555		
20 September	MoDo	5–1	Leksands		610		
20 September	Luleå	13–1	HV71		2309	Hat-trick by Reece Hunt (1); Hat-trick by Viivi Vainikka (1)	
20 September	Skellefteå	0–4	Frölunda		922	Shutout recorded by Maja Helge (1)	
22 September	MoDo	2–3	SDE	OT	212		
22 September	Luleå	1–3	Frölunda		839		
22 September	Skellefteå	1–2	HV71	OT	254		
22 September	Brynäs	1–2	Leksands		160		
23 September	Linköping	3–0	Djurgårdens		187	Shutout recorded by Ebba Svensson Träff (2)	
25 September	Frölunda	4–2	Linköping		243		
27 September	MoDo	3–1	Brynäs		224		
27 September	Frölunda	2–1	Djurgårdens		349		
27 September	SDE	1–2	Luleå	OT	82		
27 September	Leksands	1–2	Skellefteå		122		
29 September	SDE	2–1	Skellefteå	GWS	89		
29 September	HV71	2–1	Djurgårdens	GWS	95		
29 September	Leksands	2–3	Luleå		98		
	28 games played 122 goals scored			3 OT 3 GWS	11103	2 hat-tricks 5 shutouts	

October
Date	Home	Score	Visitor	OT	Attn	Notes	Recap
2 October	Linköping	1–7	Frölunda		120		
4 October	Linköping	1–4	SDE		94		
4 October	Luleå	1–2	MoDo	GWS	515		
4 October	Skellefteå	2–3	Brynäs	GWS	238		
5 October	Djurgårdens	3–0	Leksands		221	Shutout recorded by Ida Boman (2)	
6 October	Linköping	2–1	Leksands		122		
6 October	Luleå	4–1	Brynäs		489		
6 October	Skellefteå	3–4	MoDo	OT	221		
6 October	Djurgårdens	2–3	SDE	GWS	301		
9 October	Skellefteå	1–2	Luleå		591		
11 October	MoDo	0–1	Linköping		205	Shutout recorded by Ebba Svensson Träff (3)	
11 October	Brynäs	0–3	Djurgårdens		260	Shutout recorded by Ida Boman (3)	
11 October	SDE	2–4	HV71		232		
11 October	Leksands	1–4	Frölunda		152		
13 October	MoDo	5–2	Djurgårdens		200		
13 October	Leksands	2–4	HV71		685		
13 October	Brynäs	1–0	Linköping		202	Shutout recorded by Ena Nystrøm (1)	
13 October	SDE	0–1	Frölunda		65	Shutout recorded by Stephanie Neatby (1)	
15 October	Luleå	7–0	Skellefteå		4071	Shutout recorded by Sara Grahn (1)	
18 October	Brynäs	5–4	HV71		306		
18 October	MoDo	4–3	Frölunda	GWS	223		
18 October	Luleå	2–0	Linköping		404	Shutout recorded by Frida Axell (1)	
18 October	Skellefteå	2–3	Djurgårdens		182		
20 October	MoDo	3–2	HV71		558		
20 October	Skellefteå	0–1	Linköping		236	Shutout recorded by Ebba Svensson Träff (4)	
20 October	Luleå	1–3	Djurgårdens		319		
20 October	Brynäs	5–4	Frölunda	OT	165		
23 October	HV71	2–1	Linköping	OT	97		
25 October	HV71	0–4	Luleå		102	Shutout recorded by Frida Axell (2)	
25 October	SDE	1–5	Brynäs		71		
25 October	Leksands	0–1	MoDo		182	Shutout recorded by Andrea Brändli (1)	
25 October	Frölunda	3–4	Skellefteå		1372		
26 October	Frölunda	2–1	Luleå		420		
27 October	HV71	4–3	Skellefteå	OT	280		
27 October	Leksands	3–4	Brynäs		715		
27 October	SDE	3–2	MoDo		78		
30 October	Linköping	4–2	HV71		918		
31 October	Djurgårdens	3–2	Frölunda		131		
	37 games played 177 goals scored			4 OT 4 GWS	15646	0 hat-tricks 10 shutouts	

November
Date	Home	Score	Visitor	OT	Attn	Notes	Recap
1 November	Luleå	5–3	SDE		725	Hat-trick by Petra Nieminen (1), four goals total	
1 November	Skellefteå	1–0	Leksands		134	Shutout recorded by Camryn Drever (1)	
1 November	Brynäs	2–3	MoDo		1943		
1 November	Djurgårdens	5–2	HV71		83		
3 November	Skellefteå	0–4	SDE		248	Hat-trick by Emily Nix (1); Shutout recorded by Lovisa Berndtsson (1)	
3 November	Luleå	3–1	Leksands		429		
13 November	MoDo	1–2	Luleå	GWS	407		
13 November	Frölunda	5–1	HV71		409		
15 November	HV71		Frölunda				
15 November	Brynäs		Luleå				
15 November	MoDo		Skellefteå				
15 November	SDE		Linköping				
15 November	Leksands		Djurgårdens				
17 November	Brynäs		Skelleteå				
17 November	Leksands		Linköping				
17 November	SDE		Djurgårdens				
22 November	HV71		SDE				
22 November	Linköping		MoDo				
22 November	Frölunda		Leksands				
24 November	Frölunda		SDE				
24 November	HV71		Leksands				
24 November	Djurgårdens		MoDo				
24 November	Linköping		Brynäs				
29 November	HV71		MoDo				
29 November	Linköping		Skellefteå				
29 November	Frölunda		Brynäs				
30 November	Djurgårdens		Luleå				
	8 games played 38 goals scored			0 OT 1 GWS	4378	2 hat-tricks 2 shutouts	

=== Player statistics ===
==== Scoring leaders ====
The following players were the league's top-twenty point scorers at the conclusion of the regular season on 16 February 2025.

Player	Team	GP	G	A	Pts	PIM
Petra Nieminen	Luleå	36	25	20	45	12
Elisa Holopainen	Frölunda	36	24	21	45	8
Viivi Vainikka	Luleå	36	18	26	44	6
Hanna Olsson	Frölunda	36	9	30	39	10
Adéla Šapovalivová	MoDo	34	15	21	36	8
Michelle Karvinen	Frölunda	32	21	14	35	10
Sofie Lundin	Frölunda	36	18	16	34	14
Jenniina Nylund	Brynäs	34	18	14	32	22
Elin Svensson	HV71	35	16	15	31	2
Hanna Thuvik	Brynäs	33	13	18	31	43
Akane Shiga	Luleå	34	9	22	31	16
Emma Nordin	Luleå	34	17	12	29	4
Nadia Mattivi	Luleå	34	3	24	27	16
Tereza Plosová	Djurgården	35	17	9	26	12
Brette Pettet	Djurgården	35	14	12	26	2
Sanni Vanhanen	Frölunda	35	12	14	26	0
Hilda Svensson	HV71	36	7	19	26	8
Linnéa Johansson	Luleå	35	13	12	25	8
Tereza Pištěková	Djurgården	35	7	18	25	14
Ida Kuoppala	Skellefteå	32	13	11	24	6

The following skaters were the top point scorers of teams that were not represented in the scoring leader table at the conclusion of the regular season on 16 February 2025, noted with their overall league scoring rank:

21. Lisa Johansson, SDE: 34 GP, 9 G, 15 A, 24 Pts, 10 PIM
24. Sara Hjalmarsson, Linköping: 31 GP, 12 G, 11 A, 23 Pts, 32 PIM
69. Saga Nissas Thynell, Leksand: 36 GP, 10 G, 2 A, 12 Pts, 35 PIM

==== Goaltenders ====
The following goaltenders played at least forty-percent of their team's minutes in net at the conclusion of the regular season on 16 February 2025, sorted by save percentage.

Player	Team	GPI	TOI	W	L	SOG	GA	SO	S%	GAA
Frida Axell	Luleå	18	1080:00	18	0	296	16	7	94.59	0.89
Andrea Brändli	MoDo	28	1693:37	18	10	757	44	3	94.19	1.56
Kassidy Sauvé	SDE	18	1080:04	9	8	550	33	1	94.00	1.83
Stephanie Neatby	Frölunda	25	1500:04	18	7	699	44	3	93.71	1.76
Ida Boman	Djurgården	29	1742:07	13	16	707	45	7	93.64	1.55
Camryn Drever	Skellefteå	23	1340:47	10	11	660	45	4	93.18	2.01
Ebba Svensson Träff	Linköping	31	1836:44	13	18	1004	75	8	92.53	2.45
Emma Polusny	Leksand	22	1291:20	3	19	758	57	0	92.48	2.65
Sara Grahn	Luleå	18	1089:09	10	8	386	31	1	91.97	1.71
Ena Nystrøm	Brynäs	29	1694:30	15	13	832	69	2	91.71	2.44
Viktorie Švejdová	HV71	24	1296:00	7	15	640	64	1	90.00	2.96
Lovisa Berndtsson	SDE	17	990:58	10	7	378	40	2	89.42	2.42

== Playoffs ==
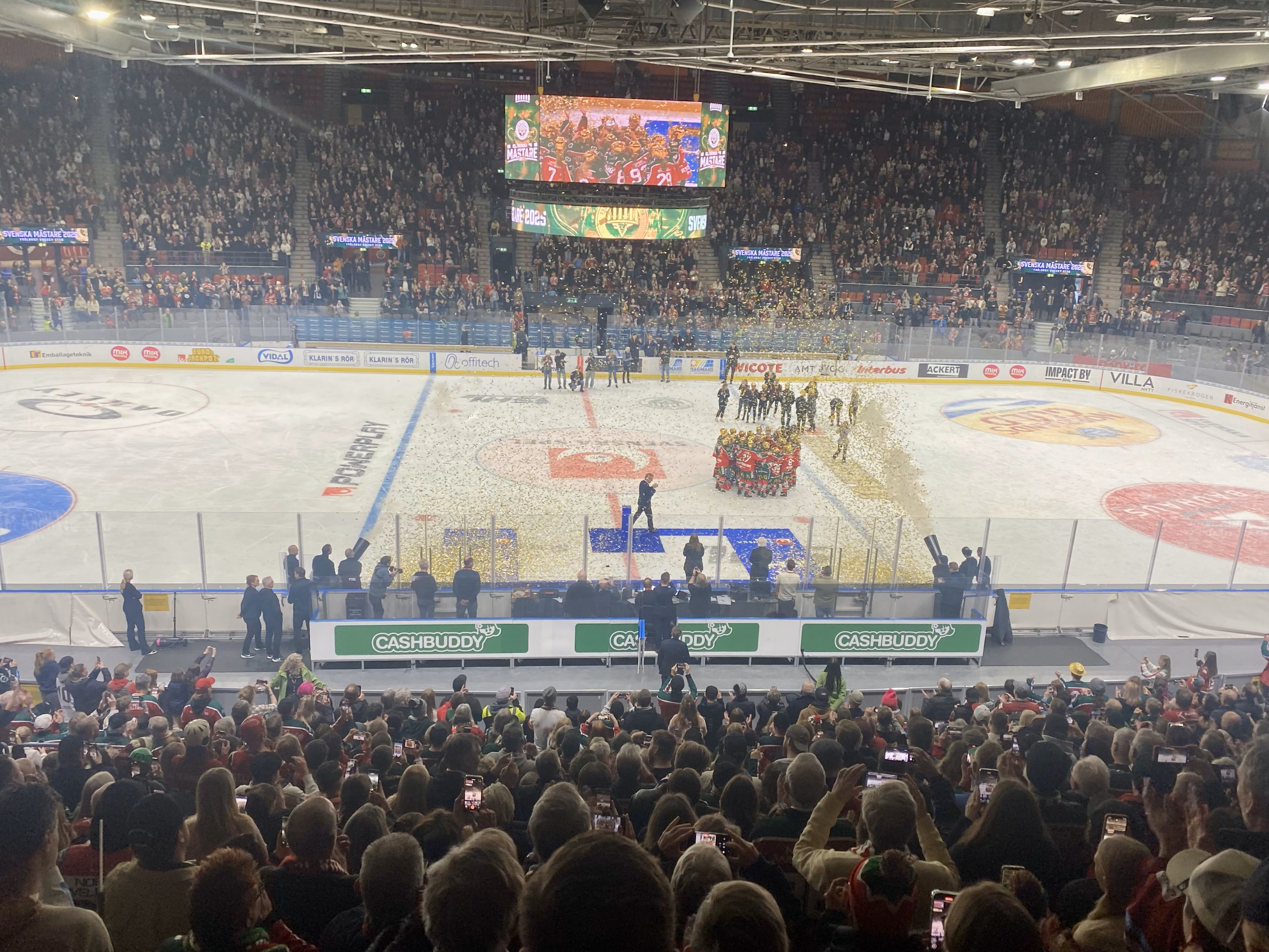
Frölunda HC wins the Swedish Championship

Quarterfinals
1	Luleå HF/MSSK	3
8	Skellefteå AIK	0
3	MoDo Hockey	2
6	SDE HF	3
4	Brynäs IF	3
5	Djurgårdens IF	1
2	Frölunda HC	3
7	Linköping HC	0

Semifinals
Luleå HF/MSSK	3
SDE HF	0
Brynäs IF	2
Frölunda HC	3

Finals
Luleå HF/MSSK	0
Frölunda HC	3

== Awards and honors ==
=== Monthly awards ===
==== Player of the Month ====
The SDHL player of the month (Swedish: månadens spelare) is selected by a jury comprising representatives from Svenska Spel, the SDHL, and the media. Each winner selects an organization to receive 10,000kr towards promoting Swedish ice hockey. Winners are listed with the programs selected for donation in parentheses.

- September/October 2024: Elisa Holopainen, Frölunda HC (Frölunda HC girls' ice hockey program)

→ Nominees: Frida Axell (Luleå HF/MSSK), Kassidy Sauvé (SDE), Akane Shiga (Luleå HF/MSSK), and Elin Svensson (HV71)

=== Weekly awards ===
==== Goal of the Week ====
The SDHL goal of the week (Swedish: Veckans mål) is selected by fan vote from five candidates via the league's website and social media accounts. Percentage of votes cast for the winner is in parentheses, when available.

September 2024

- ~~Week 1:~~ Preseason
- Week 2: None selected
- Week 3: Felizia Wikner-Zienkiewicz, Frölunda HC (79.6%)
- Week 4: Hanna Olsson, Frölunda HC (69.3%)

November 2024

- Week 1: Liliane Perreault, SDE (91.8%)
- Week 2: No games played (WEHT)

October 2024

- Week 1: Emilia Vesa, Frölunda HC (62.0%)
- Week 2: Sanni Rantala, Frölunda HC (92.2%)
- Week 3: Sofie Lundin, Frölunda HC (84.1%)
- Week 4: Michelle Karvinen, Frölunda HC (73.9%)

==== Save of the Week ====
The SDHL save of the week (Swedish: Veckans räddning) is selected from five candidates by fan vote via the league's website and social media accounts. Percentage of votes cast for the winner is in parentheses, when available.

September 2024

- ~~Week 1:~~ Preseason
- Week 2: None selected
- Week 3: Camryn Drever, Skellefteå AIK (39.5%)
- Week 4: Ebba Svensson Träff, Linköping HC (49.0%)

November 2024

- Week 1: Ebba Svensson Träff, Linköping HC (32.4%)
- Week 2: No games played (WEHT)

October 2024

- Week 1: Ebba Svensson Träff, Linköping HC (42.0%)
- Week 2: Camryn Drever, Skellefteå AIK (71.9%)
- Week 3: Ebba Svensson Träff, Linköping HC (28.6%)
- Week 4: Camryn Drever, Skellefteå AIK (72.2%)
