= Petra Nieminen =

Finnish ice hockey player (born 1999)

- Born: 4 May 1999 (age 27) Tampere, Finland
- Height: 1.69 m (5 ft 7 in)
- Weight: 64 kg (141 lb; 10 st 1 lb)
- Position: Forward
- Shoots: Left
- PWHL team Former teams: Montreal Victoire; Team Kuortane; Luleå HF/MSSK
- National team: Finland
- Playing career: 2013–present
Medal record
Olympic Games
Bronze medal – third place	2018 Pyeongchang	Ice hockey
Bronze medal – third place	2022 Beijing	Ice hockey
World Championship
Silver medal – second place	2019 Finland
Bronze medal – third place	2017 United States
Bronze medal – third place	2021 Canada
Bronze medal – third place	2024 United States
Bronze medal – third place	2025 Czechia

Petra Nieminen (born 4 May 1999) is a Finnish ice hockey player for the Montreal Victoire of the Professional Women's Hockey League (PWHL) and an alternate captain of the Finnish national ice hockey team. She previously played in the Swedish Women's Hockey League (SDHL) with Luleå HF/MSSK and in the Finnish Naisten Liiga (NSML) with Team Kuortane. She was selected by the Montreal Victoire in the first round of the 2026 PWHL Draft.

== Playing career ==
Nieminen's minor ice hockey career was played with the youth department of Tappara in her hometown of Tampere. She played on boys' teams during her childhood and into her teen years, playing on the same youth team as future NHLer Patrik Laine. Beginning when she was 13, she intermittently played with the Tappara representative women's team in the Naisten Mestis and Naisten Suomi-sarja, the second-and third-tier women's senior leagues in Finland.

At age 16, she moved to Kuortane and began attending the Kuortaneen urheilulukio to play with Team Kuortane in the Naisten SM-sarja (NSMs; renamed Naisten Liiga in 2017). In her first season with Kuortane, Nieminen led the team in scoring, tallying 23 points (15 goals + 8 assists) in 25 games played and was recognized with the Noora Räty Award as best rookie in the Naisten SM-sarja. She was the team's scoring leader again in the 2016–17 season. In her third season, she was Kuortane's second-highest scorer, leading the team in points per game, despite missing nine of 30 regular season games because she was representing Finland in the women's ice hockey tournament at the 2018 Winter Olympics, and was named Naisten Liiga Player of the Month for December 2017. Her 15 points (7+8) in eight playoff games helped Team Kuortane claim the Aurora Borealis Cup bronze medal, the first Finnish Championship medal in team history. She was awarded the 2018 Katja Riipi Award for best forward in the Naisten Liiga and was named to the 2018 All-Star First Team.

In 2018, she left Finland to sign with Luleå HF/MSSK in Luleå, Sweden, joining fellow Finnish national team players Jenni Hiirikoski, Michelle Karvinen, Ronja Savolainen, and Noora Tulus on the SDHL team. She scored 24 points (13+11) in 34 games of her rookie SDHL season and contributed 11 points (6+5) in eleven playoff games as Luleå won the SDHL championship.

She more than doubled her point total in the 2019–20 season, scoring 55 points (25+30) in 36 games, leading the team in scoring and finishing third in points among all players in the league. She added another 8 points in 6 playoff games as Luleå returned to the SDHL finals to face HV71 before the season was canceled due to the COVID-19 pandemic in Sweden. She was named the 2020 SDHL MVP and was a Forward of the Year Award finalist.

During the 2020 off-season, she underwent a knee operation that caused her to miss the first few games of the 2020–21 SDHL season.

Nieminen was considered a standout young talent in Finnish ice hockey during her late teens and early twenties.

=== PWHL ===
On 17 June 2026, Nieminen was drafted twelfth overall by the Montreal Victoire in the 2026 PWHL draft. She signed a two-year contract with the team on 20 November 2026.

== International play ==
Nieminen has represented Finland in international ice hockey competition since 2015, first appearing with the Finnish national under-18 team at the 2015 IIHF World Women's U18 Championship in Buffalo, New York, where she recorded two goals and three assists in five games. She scored seven goals and tallied seven assists for the Finland Selects at the 2015 World Selects Invitational in Bolzano.

At the 2016 IIHF World Women's U18 Championship, she was the team leader in points and goals, scoring four goals and two assists in five games, and was selected by the coaches as one of the top-3 players on the team.

She made her debut with the Finnish national team at the 2016 IIHF Women's World Championship, notching three points in six games as Finland finished in fourth. She has played for Finland in every World Championship since, scoring three goals in six games the 2017 IIHF Women's World Championship, as Finland won bronze.

She scored five points in six games for Finland at the 2018 Winter Olympics, the country winning bronze.

At the 2019 IIHF Women's World Championship, she scored an overtime goal in the gold medal game that would have marked the first time a country other than the United States or Canada won World Championship gold. However, after a twelve-minute video review, the goal was disallowed in a call that sparked intense controversy. She was one of the five Finnish players to then take a shot in the shootout, which culminated in a victory for the United States.

On 2 January 2026, she was named to Finland's roster to compete at the 2026 Winter Olympics.

== Career statistics ==
=== Regular season and playoffs ===
			Regular season					Playoffs
Season	Team	League	GP	G	A	Pts	PIM	GP	G	A	Pts	PIM
2011–12	Tappara	N. 1–divisioona	1	0	0	0	0	3	3	1	4	2
2012–13	Tappara	N. Mestis	13	20	8	28	2	–	–	–	–	–
2013–14	Tappara	N. Mestis	16	22	8	30	2	1	0	0	0	0
2014–15	Tappara	N. Mestis	3	8	3	11	2	–	–	–	–	–
2015–16	Team Kuortane	NSMs	25	15	8	23	14	2	1	0	1	0
2016–17	Team Kuortane	NSMs	23	15	13	28	16	2	2	1	3	0
2017–18	Team Kuortane	NSML	21	12	16	28	10	8	7	8	15	4
2018–19	Luleå/MSSK	SDHL	34	13	11	24	6	11	6	5	11	6
2019–20	Luleå/MSSK	SDHL	36	25	30	55	43	6	7	1	8	2
2020–21	Luleå/MSSK	SDHL	32	24	23	47	16	9	6	4	10	8
2021–22	Luleå/MSSK	SDHL	34	26	29	55	53	12	5	6	11	10
2022–23	Luleå/MSSK	SDHL	32	30	23	53	20	8	7	7	14	2
2023–24	Luleå/MSSK	SDHL	33	24	21	45	16	9	7	9	16	2
2024–25	Luleå/MSSK	SDHL	36	25	20	45	12	9	2	4	6	4
2025–26	Luleå/MSSK	SDHL	27	24	21	45	18	-	-	-	-	-
SDHL totals			264	191	178	369	184	64	40	36	76	34
Naisten Liiga totals			69	42	37	79	40	12	10	9	19	4

=== International ===
Year	Team	Event	Result	GP	G	A	Pts	PIM
2015	Finland	U18	5th	5	2	3	5	0
2016	Finland	U18	6th	5	4	2	6	2
2016	Finland	WC	4th	6	1	2	3	2
2017	Finland	U18	5th	5	2	3	5	4
2017	Finland	WC	3rd place, bronze medalist(s)	6	3	0	3	2
2018	Finland	OG	3rd place, bronze medalist(s)	6	3	2	5	0
2019	Finland	WC	2nd place, silver medalist(s)	7	2	1	3	0
2021	Finland	WC	3rd place, bronze medalist(s)	7	6	1	7	0
2022	Finland	OG	3rd place, bronze medalist(s)	7	3	5	8	6
2022	Finland	WC	6th	6	1	3	4	25
2023	Finland	WC	5th	7	6	7	13	2
2024	Finland	WC	3rd place, bronze medalist(s)	7	3	2	5	4
2025	Finland	WC	3rd place, bronze medalist(s)	7	1	2	3	0
2026	Finland	OG	6th	5	0	1	1	4
2026	Finland	WC	4th	7	3	4	7	0
Junior totals				15	8	8	16	6
Senior totals				78	32	30	62	45

== Awards and honors ==
Award	Year
International
World U18 Top-3 Player on Team	2016
Olympic Bronze Medal	2018
Olympic Bronze Medal	2022
World Championship Bronze Medal	2017
World Championship Bronze Medal	2021
World Championship Bronze Medal	2025
World Championship Silver Medal	2019
World Championship All-Star Team	2021
World Championship All-Star Team	2023
World Championship Top-3 Player on Team	2023
World Championship Top-3 Player on Team	2024
World Championship Top-3 Player on Team	2026
Swedish Women's Hockey League
SDHL Champion	2019
SDHL Champion	2021
SDHL Champion	2022
SDHL Champion	2023
SDHL Champion	2024
Playoffs MVP	2022–23
Most Goals, regular season	2022–23
Most Goals, regular season	2023–24
Most Goals, regular season	2024–25
Most Points, regular season	2024–25
Most Points, regular season	2025–26
Naisten Liiga
Noora Räty Award (Rookie of the Year)	2015–16
Player of the Month	December 2017
All-Star First Team	2017–18
Finnish Championship Bronze Medal	2017–19
Katja Riipi Award (Forward of the Year)	2017–18
