= Djurgårdens IF (women's ice hockey) =

SDHL ice hockey team in Stockholm, Sweden

- City: Djurgården, Stockholm, Sweden
- League: SDHL
- Founded: 25 March 2014
- Home arena: Hovet
- Colors: Blue, red, yellow
- General manager: Rickard Hårdstam
- Head coach: Rickard Hårdstam
- Website: Official website

Franchise history
- 2003–2015: Segeltorps IF
- 2014–: Djurgårdens IF

Championships
- Playoff championships: 1 (2016–17)

Djurgården IF Hockey are a semi-professional ice hockey team in the Swedish Women's Hockey League (SDHL). Home games are played at Hovet in Stockholm. The team is a section within the Djurgårdens IF multi-sport organization and are affiliated with its many other teams.

== History ==
In March 2014, the Djurgårdens IF organisation announced its intention to form a women's ice hockey section, with Danijela Rundqvist in charge of recruitment and Jared Cipparone serving as head coach. The following year, the organisation took over the Segeltorps IF women's ice hockey club following its financial difficulties and relegation from Riksserien. After just one year under the Djurgården name in Damettan – during which the club made several major signings, including Valentina Lizana Wallner and Tina Enström – the club won promotion back to the top flight, defeating Södertälje 6–1 in the qualification playoffs.

On 9 September 2015, Djurgården played its first Riksserien match, with Andrea Schjelderup Dalen scoring the team's first Riksserien goal in a 5–1 loss to Linköping HC. The team's first Riksserien victory would come four days later, 5–2 against HV71. On 19 September 2015, the club played its first Riksserien match at home, beating Brynäs IF 5–3 in front of 834 spectators. The club finished the 2015–16 season in 4th place in the SDHL, losing to Linköping in the playoff semifinals, as Andrea Schjelderup Dalen set a single-season SDHL record for goals, with 47.

The club finished in second place in the SDHL in the 2016–17 season, the club's best regular season result to date. In the playoffs, the club made it to the finals against HV71, where they would win their first SDHL championship. That season, the club also participated in the first SDHL Winter Classic against IF Sundsvall Hockey. After the season, club founders Danijela Rundqvist and Nils Ekman left the club.

In August 2017, the club hosted the Minnesota Whitecaps during a series of exhibition games against SDHL teams in Stockholm.

During the 2018–19 season, second-highest all-time scorer in club history Hanna Olsson criticised the organisation's supporter club, Järnkaminerna, for not doing enough to support the women's side, despite the club supposedly having the best supporters in Sweden. In January 2019, she left the club on bad terms after conflict with the coach and the club's refusal to immediately let her sign a new contract with another SDHL club. The club would finish the season in 6th place, the worst regular season result in its history, and failed to advance past the playoff quarterfinals for the first time.

The club would improve in the 2019–20 season, finishing in 4th and being elimated by HV71 in the semi-finals. After the season, head coach Alana Blahoski, as well as Canadian players Jennifer Wakefield and Samantha Ridgewell announced they were leaving the club.

== Season-by-season record ==
This is a partial list of the most recent seasons completed by Djurgården.

Code explanation: Finish = Rank at end of regular season; GP = Games played, W = Wins (3 points), OTW = Overtime wins (2 points), OTL = Overtime losses (1 point), L = Losses, GF = Goals for, GA = Goals against, Pts = Points, Top scorer: Points (Goals+Assists)

Season	League	Regular season										Postseason results
Season	League	Finish	GP	W	OTW	OTL	L	GF	GA	Pts	Top scorer	Postseason results
2015–16	Riksserien	4th	36	21	2	2	11	130	75	69	(Norway) A. Dalen 73 (47+26)	Lost semifinal against Linköping HC
2016–17	SDHL	2nd	36	23	3	4	6	97	73	79	(Sweden) T. Enström 36 (8+28)	Won Championship against HV71
2017–18	SDHL	4th	36	21	4	1	10	118	72	72	(Denmark) J. Jakobsen 51 (19+32)	Lost semifinal against Luleå HF/MSSK
2018–19	SDHL	6th	36	19	3	0	14	112	81	63	(Norway) A. Dalen 41 (19+22)	Lost quarterfinal against Linköping HC
2019–20	SDHL	4th	36	21	1	4	10	96	77	69	(Canada) J. Wakefield 28 (13+15)	Lost semifinal against HV71
2020–21	SDHL	4th	36	20	3	1	12	92	71	67	(Denmark) J. Jakobsen 36 (15+21)	Lost semifinal against Luleå HF/MSSK
2021–22	SDHL	6th	36	12	2	3	19	77	100	43	(Denmark) J. Jakobsen 21 (5+16)	Lost quarterfinal against Luleå HF/MSSK
2022–23	SDHL	3rd	32	17	1	4	10	83	69	57	(Denmark) J. Jakobsen 29 (9+20)	Lost semifinal against Brynäs IF
2023–24	SDHL	5th	36	16	3	5	12	82	75	59	(United States) A. Linser 31 (14+17)	Lost quarterfinal against Frölunda, 3–2

== Players and personnel ==
=== 2024–25 roster ===
As of 30 August 2024

No.	Nat	Player	Pos	S/G	Age	Acquired	Birthplace
24	(Sweden)	Linnea Adelbertsson	C	L	21	2021	Södertälje, Södermanland, Sweden
31	(Sweden)	Ida Boman	G	L	22	2018	Sollentuna, Uppland, Sweden
8	(Sweden)	Emma Forsgren	D	L	23	2023	Danderyd, Uppland, Sweden
21	(Sweden)	Wilma Georgny	D	R	19	2023	Stockholm, Sweden
73	(Czech Republic)	Hana Haasová	F	L	22	2023	Opava, Moravskoslezský kraj, Czechia
26	(Sweden)	Alva Hellqvist	D	L	23	2024	
12	(Sweden)	Tuva Kärrhage	F	L	21	2024	
1	(Sweden)	Lia Leiderö Palmlöv	G	L	19	2022	Stockholm, Sweden
81	(Sweden)	Isabelle Leijonhielm	F	L	19	2024	Täby, Uppland, Sweden
11	(Sweden)	Linn Mattsson	RW	L	18	2023	Stockholm, Sweden
9	(Sweden)	Linnea Natt och Dag	D	L	19	2022	Stockholm, Sweden
20	(Canada)	Brette Pettet	F	R	27	2022	Kentville, Nova Scotia, Canada
34	(Czech Republic)	Tereza Pištěková	F	L	20	2024	Tábor, Jihočeský kraj, Czechia
22	(Czech Republic)	Tereza Plosová	F	L	19	2023	
16	(United States)	Maddie Posick	D	L	26	2022	Stoughton, Wisconsin, United States
69	(Sweden)	Ebba Ridderstolpe	G	L	18	2023	Botkyrka, Södermanland, Sweden
25	(Finland)	Sara Säkkinen	F	L	27	2023	Pirkkala, Pirkanmaa, Finland
86	(Sweden)	Selma Tyreskog	D	L	22	2019	Stockholm, Sweden
6	(Czech Republic)	Linda Vocetková	F	R	18	2023	
27	(Sweden)	Alice Wallin	C	L	21	2021	Södertälje, Södermanland, Sweden
4	(Sweden)	Wilma Germundsson Wäng	D	R	26	2018	Södertälje, Södermanland, Sweden
18	(Sweden)	Alice Östensson	C	R	30	2018	Örnsköldsvik, Ångermanland, Sweden

Coaching staff and team personnel

- Head coach: Rickard Hårdstam
- Assistant coach: Robin Lotthagen
- Goaltending coach: Erik Ladhe
- Physical therapist: Elinor Haapanen
- Equipment manager: Tomas Rydgren

=== Team captaincy history ===
- Alexandra Palm (Cipparone), 2015–2017
- Andrea Dalen, 2018–2020
- Andrea Dalen & Wilma Germundsson Wäng, 2020–21
- Josefine Holmgren, 2022–23
- Brette Pettet, 2023–

=== Head coaches ===
- Jared Cipparone, 2014–2017
- Roger Öhman, 2017–18
- Alana Blahoski, 2018–2020
- Rickard Hårdstam, 2020–

== Franchise records and leaders ==
=== All-time scoring leaders ===
The top-ten point scorers (goals + assists) of Djurgårdens IF, through the conclusion of the 2023–24 season.

Note: Nat = Nationality; Pos = Position; GP = Games played; G = Goals; A = Assists; Pts = Points; P/G = Points per game; = 2024–25 Djurgårdens IF player

Points
Nat	Player	Pos	GP	G	A	Pts	P/G
(Norway)	Andrea Schjelderup Dalen	LW	199	136	99	235	1.18
(Denmark)	Josefine Jakobsen	C	232	87	128	215	0.93
(Sweden)	Julia Östlund	C/LW	233	61	100	161	0.69
(Sweden)	Hanna Olsson	F	110	68	80	148	1.35
(Sweden)	Tina Enström	C	83	47	101	148	1.78
(Sweden)	Sofie Lundin	F	173	32	53	85	0.49
(Sweden)	Alice Östensson	C	191	33	48	81	0.42
(Sweden)	Alexandra Palm	W	81	33	31	64	0.79
(Sweden)	Josefine Holmgren	D	169	21	41	62	0.37
(Sweden)	Nicole Hall	F	211	27	33	60	0.28
