= Kiira Yrjänen =

Finnish ice hockey player (born 2002)

- Born: 2 January 2002 (age 24) Riihimäki, Finland
- Height: 161 cm (5 ft 3 in)
- Weight: 58 kg (128 lb; 9 st 2 lb)
- Position: Forward
- Shoots: Left
- Auroraliiga team Former teams: Kiekko-Espoo: Leksands IF; HV71; Team Kuortane
- National team: Finland
- Playing career: 2016–present

Kiira Yrjänen (born 2 January 2002) is a Finnish ice hockey player and member of the Finnish national team. She has played with Kiekko-Espoo in the Auroraliiga since 2025.

== Playing career ==
Yrjänen left Finland in 2022 to play with HV71 in the Swedish Women's Hockey League (SDHL). She played two seasons with HV71 before signing a two-year contract with Leksands IF ahead of the 2024–25 SDHL season.

After one season with Leksands, Yrjänen opted to return to Finland and rejoin Kiekko-Espoo for the 2025–26 season.

== International play ==
As a junior player with the national under-18 team, Yrjänen represented Finland the IIHF U18 Women's World Championship in 2017, 2018, and 2020, and with the bronze medal team in 2019.

Yrjänen's first goal with the senior national team was scored on 6 February 2020 in a match against the Swiss national team at the Finals Tournament of the 2019–20 Women's Euro Hockey Tour.

Yrjänen was officially named to the Finnish roster for the 2020 IIHF Women's World Championship on 4 March 2020, before the tournament was cancelled on 7 March 2020 due to public health concerns related to the COVID-19 pandemic.
