= Kajsa Armborg =

Swedish ice hockey forward

- Born: 29 June 1998 (age 27) Örebro, Sweden
- Height: 162 cm (5 ft 4 in)
- Weight: 69 kg (152 lb; 10 st 12 lb)
- Position: Centre
- Shoots: Left
- SDHL team Former teams: HV71; Leksands IF
- Playing career: 2013–present

Kajsa Armborg (born 29 June 1998) is a Swedish ice hockey forward, currently playing with HV71 Dam of the Swedish Women's Hockey League. She previously played seven seasons with Leksands IF Dam, serving as an alternate captain in the 2019–20 and 2020–21 seasons. In 2016, she won a bronze medal with Sweden at the World U18 Championship.

== Personal life ==
Outside of hockey, Armborg works in a pre-school. She played youth football for Örebro SK and was named the region's most promising player multiple times.
