= Frölunda HC (women) =

SDHL ice hockey team in Gothenburg, Sweden

- City: Gothenburg, Sweden
- League: SDHL
- Founded: 2022
- Home arena: Frölundaborg
- Colours: Red, green, white
- Owner: Frölunda HC
- General manager: Kim Martin Hasson
- Head coach: Erika Holst
- Captain: Hanna Olsson
- Website: frolundahockey.com

Championships
- Playoff championships: 1 (2025)

Frölunda HC are an ice hockey team in the Swedish Women's Hockey League (SDHL). They play in the Västra Frölunda borough of Gothenburg, Sweden at Frölundaborg.

== History ==
Frölunda HC chose to form a women's team in 2022, one year after the club introduced a hockeygymnasiet (lit. 'hockey gymnasium') program for girls. The club highlighted its desire to build an elite team for its eight hockeygymnasiet students, to provide an opportunity for other girls in the greater region to play at the senior level without having to move far from home, and to attract senior players originally from the Västergötland area who were playing with other teams but would return to Gothenburg to play with Frölunda HC. Regarding Göteborg HC, the Gothenburg-based team already active in the SDHL, Frölunda HC Chairman Mats Grauers felt "there is room for two senior teams [in Gothenburg]."

Kim Martin Hasson was appointed the nascent team's first general manager and Erika Holst took the reins as its first head coach. Major signings ahead of the inaugural season included Hanna Olsson from HV71, Andrea Schjelderup Dalen and Stephanie Neatby from Linköping HC, Sarah-Ève Coutu-Godbout from AIK Hockey, and Michelle Karvinen from the KRS Vanke Rays.

The team debuted in the Nationella Damhockeyligan (NDHL) in fall 2022 with the stated intention to gain promotion to the SDHL for the 2023–24 season. They quickly established themselves as a dominant presence in the NDHL and whitewashed their divisional rivals to claim victory in Damettan Södra. The winning streak continued in HockeyAllsvenskan Södra and, after claiming victory against IF Troja-Ljungby and IF Björklöven in the conference playoff, Frölunda earned advancement to the SDHL qualifying series. After playing only two qualification games, they gained promotion to the SDHL.

The 2024–2025 season saw the team winning the Swedish Championship, following a victory, 3–0, in the final series against Luleå HF i finalserien.

== Season-by-season results ==
This is a list of all seasons completed by Frölunda HC.
Note: Finish = Rank at end of regular season; GP = Games played, W = Wins (3 points), OTW = Overtime wins (2 points), OTL = Overtime losses (1 point), L = Losses, GF = Goals for, GA = Goals against, Pts = Points, Top scorer: Points (Goals+Assists)

Season	League	Regular season										Postseason results
Season	League	Finish	GP	W	OTW	OTL	L	GF	GA	Pts	Top scorer	Postseason results
2022–23	NDHL	1st	21	21	0	0	0	244	7	63	(Finland) M. Karvinen 114 (62+52)	Promoted to SDHL
2023–24	SDHL	4th	36	17	6	1	12	97	86	64	(Finland) M. Karvinen 39 (21+18)	Lost semifinals to Luleå, 0–3
2024–25	SDHL	1st	36	21	7	5	3	124	72	76	(Finland) E. Holopainen 45 (24+21)	Won Championship, 3–0 Luleå

== Players and personnel ==
=== 2024–25 roster ===
As of 19 December 2024

No.	Nat	Player	Pos	S/G	Age	Acquired	Birthplace
45	(Sweden)	Paula Bergström	D	L	27	2024	Örnsköldsvik, Ångermanland, Sweden
6	(Sweden)	Maja Beverin	D	R	23	2022	Jönköping, Småland, Sweden
88	(United States)	Sydney Brodt	F	R	27	2024	North Oaks, Minnesota, United States
16	(Sweden)	Jennifer Carlsson	C	L	25	2022	Gothenburg, Västergötland, Sweden
22	(Norway)	Andrea Dalen	F	R	33	2022	Hønefoss, Østlandet, Norway
13	(Sweden)	Edit Danielsson	LW	L	18	2023	Växjö, Småland, Sweden
36	(Sweden)	Emilia Bergeby Hallbeck	W	L	19	2022	Floda, Västra Götaland, Sweden
1	(Sweden)	Maja Helge	G	L	19	2023	Växjö, Småland, Sweden
11	(Sweden)	Ella Hellman	W	L	19	2022	Råda, Värmland, Sweden
18	(Finland)	Elisa Holopainen	F	L	24	2024	Tuusniemi, North Savo, Finland
9	(Sweden)	Alva Johnsson	D	L	26	2024	Stockholm, Uppland, Sweden
33	(Finland)	Michelle Karvinen (A)	W	L	35	2022	Rødovre, Hovedstaden, Denmark
5	(Sweden)	Nathalie Lidman	D	L	24	2024	Piteå, Norrbotten, Sweden
98	(Sweden)	Felicia Linder	D	L	28	2022	Stockholm, Sweden
97	(Sweden)	Sofie Lundin	C/RW	L	25	2023	Helsingborg, Skåne, Sweden
35	(Canada)	Stephanie Neatby	G	L	27	2022	Toronto, Ontario, Canada
26	(Sweden)	Hanna Olsson (C)	F	L	27	2022	Hälsö, Bohuslän, Sweden
27	(Sweden)	Linnéa Pettersson Dove	D	R	21	2022	Skärhamn, Bohuslän, Sweden
7	(Finland)	Sanni Rantala	D	R	23	2024	Riihimäki, Kanta-Häme, Finland
93	(Sweden)	Nellie Svensson	D	L	18	2022	Kållered, Västergötland, Sweden
73	(Sweden)	Ella Thorbard	W	L	19	2022	
88	(Sweden)	Tilde Utbult	F	R	19	2022	Öckerö, Bohuslän, Sweden
10	(Finland)	Emilia Vesa	RW	R	25	2023	Helsinki, Uusimaa, Finland
4	(Sweden)	Ebba Westerlind	D	L	18	2024	Vänersborg, Västergötland, Sweden
29	(Sweden)	Felizia Wikner Zienkiewicz	LW	L	26	2023	Kungsbacka, Halland, Sweden

Coaching staff and team personnel

- Head coach: Erika Holst
- Assistant coach: Marcus Anselm
- Goaltending coach: William Nordlund
- Conditioning coach: Tilda Krüger Nilsson
- Physical therapist: Annika Lindqvist
- Equipment manager: Jay Hasson

=== Team captaincy history ===
- Hanna Olsson, 2022–present

=== Head coaches ===
- Erika Holst, 2022–present
