= 2020–21 SDHL season =

14th season of the Swedish Women's Hockey League

2020-21 SDHL season
- League: Swedish Women's Hockey League
- Sport: Ice hockey
- Duration: Regular season; 12 September 2020 – 26 February 2021; Playoffs; 1 March – 29 March
- Games: 36
- Teams: 10

Regular season
- Season champions: Luleå HF/MSSK
- Runners-up: Brynäs IF
- Top scorer: Lara Stalder (Brynäs)

Playoffs
- Finals champions: Luleå HF/MSSK
- Runners-up: Brynäs IF

SDHL seasons
- ← 2019–20 2021-22 →

The 2020–21 SDHL season was the 14th season of the Swedish Women's Hockey League (Swedish: Svenska damhockeyligan; SDHL). The season began on 12 September 2020 and concluded on 26 February 2021. All ten teams were able to complete a full 36-game regular season. The season marked the return to play for the SDHL after the 2019–20 season championship finals were cancelled due to the COVID-19 pandemic in Sweden.

== League business ==
=== Background ===
Both Modo Hockey and Göteborg HC survived relegation in the 2019–20 SDHL season, having respectively defeated the Skellefteå AIK and the Malmö Redhawks of the Damettan. HV71 had finished at the top of the league table during the 2019–20 regular season, and were due to face-off against Luleå HF/MSSK in the playoff championships before the season was cancelled due to the COVID-19 pandemic.

=== Partnerships ===
During the 2020 summer off-season, the league announced the extension of the sponsorship with DHL, the league's main sponsor. In October 2020, the league launches an online merchandise store in collaboration with DHL. Spendrups brewery Norrlands Guld extended their sponsorship rights over the SDHL Goal of the Week, voted for by the public. In August, the league announced an expansion of its partnership with the men's Swedish Hockey League (SHL) through 2024, with an increase in investment of several million kronor.

=== Collective bargaining ===
In September, the Swedish ice hockey players' association, SICO, announced the league's first-ever collective bargaining agreement between the players, the league, and the Swedish national team, providing injury insurance for both league and international games along with aid for education and job-finding post-retirement. The agreement came into effect on 1 October 2020.

=== Media rights ===
C More Entertainment acquired the broadcasting rights for the season's games, with 20 regular season games and 10 playoff games (including the championship finals) to be broadcast live by the national broadcaster Sveriges Television (SVT). The C More broadcasting team included former Olympic silver medal winner Pernilla Winberg, along with former NHLer Staffan Kronwall, and journalist Kajsa Kalméus.

== COVID-19 impact ==
The COVID-19 pandemic in Sweden had a significant impact on league operations. The country's approach is guided by the Public Health Agency of Sweden (Swedish: Folkhälsomyndigheten), although the health boards of every individual region (Swedish: län) have a degree of autonomy in being able to impose additional regional measures, which many began doing in late October and early November as the second wave of the pandemic worsened.

Before the start of the season, along with the men's SHL and HockeyAllsvenskan, the SDHL presented a plan to allow a limited audience for games. The league will implement personalised tickets as well as blocking off rows of seats to ensuring physical distancing, and fan associations will not be allowed to organise trips to away games. Several clubs, including HV71 and Djurgården, opted to keep matches closed to the public, whether others opted to go ahead and sellup to 50 tickets. The Swedish Ice Hockey Association further set guidelines that a minimum of five players should be suspected of infection with COVID-19 before a match can be suspended.

In October, the Swedish government announced plans to allow up to 500 spectators to attend sporting events, but soon backed down from the plan due to increasing case numbers in the country. Later that month, the SDHL announced a partnership with Dynamic Code to improve testing for players and personnel.

On the 15 November, a match between Linköping HC and Djurgårdens IF was cancelled after two Djurgården players tested positive for COVID-19 and a further two players showed symptoms. It marked the first confirmed cases in the league for the season. On 16 November, the Swedish government announced new pandemic restrictions, limiting the number of people allowed at public events to eight. On 17 November, Luleå HF announced that they would close their arena to the public beginning on 22 December. On 20 November, the Swedish government announced a 195 million kronor financial support package for ice hockey in Sweden, of which 3,1 million kr was assigned to the SDHL.

Because of the closedown of communal sports halls in Sweden, December-January, it was decided to not crown champions in Damettan whereupon the relegation tournament was cancelled, and no SDHL teams faced the risk of relegation.

=== Impact on player salaries ===
Because the average SDHL salary is 5,500kr per month (compared to 121,000kr for the SHL), many SDHL players have second jobs outside of hockey and have been affected by cutbacks in the COVID-19 recession.

After the 2020 IIHF Women's World Championship was cancelled due to the COVID-19 pandemic, several Finnish national team players had to seek a second job since they did not receive the usual stipend for playing in the World Championships.

== Format ==
Each team plays 36 games, with three points being awarded for winning in regulation time, two points for winning in overtime or shootout, one point for losing in overtime or shootout, and zero points for losing in regulation time. At the end of the regular season, the team that finishes with the most points is crowned the regular season champion, and the top eight teams proceed to a playoff tournament. The two bottom-ranked teams proceed to a relegation tournament against the top two teams from the Damettan. The top two teams from the tournament qualify for the SDHL and the bottom two teams play in the Damettan in the next season, meaning that it is possible for one or both of the SDHL teams to be relegated and one or both of the Damettan teams to be promoted. This relegation tournament was cancelled due to COVID-19 restrictions.

=== Teams ===
Team	City	Arena	Capacity
AIK	Solna	Ulriksdals Ishall	
Brynäs IF	Gävle	Monitor ERP Arena	7,909
Djurgårdens IF	Stockholm	Hovet	8,094
Göteborg HC	Gothenburg	Angered arena	
HV71	Jönköping	Kinnarps Arena	7,000
Leksands IF	Leksand	Tegera Arena	7,650
Linköping HC	Linköping	Stångebro Ishall	8,500
Luleå HF/MSSK	Luleå	Coop Norrbotten Arena	6,300
Modo Hockey	Örnsköldsvik	Fjällräven Center	7,600
SDE Hockey	Danderyd	Enebybergs Ishall	

== Significant events ==
=== Pre-season ===
- SDE Hockey goaltender Sofia Reideborn leaves the league after making a controversial podcatst
- Luleå HF/MSSK all-time scorer Michelle Karvinen leaves the league to sign in Switzerland
- Former NHLer and Sveriges Radio commentator Per Svartvadet suggests that the SDHL could limit the number of foreign players per team

=== Regular season ===
==== September 2020 ====
- Linköping HC beat AIK 3–2 in the first match of the season; Luleå HF/MSSK beat HV71 4–0 in first rematch of the cancelled 2019-20 playoff finals; Modo Hockey forward Marion Allemoz scores first hat-trick of the season in 5–1 victory against Göteborg HC; SDE Hockey goaltender Lindsey Post posts 52-save shutout against Djurgårdens IF; newly appointed Swedish Ice Hockey Association general-secretary Johan Stark called for the men's and women's national teams to receive equal conditions; Brynäs IF forward Anna Meixner earns the Goal of Week award
- HV71 forward Danielle Stone posts 5-point game against Göteborg HC; the first collective bargaining agreement between the players and the league is announced; SDE forward Kayleigh Hamers earns the Goal of the Week award
- Brynäs IF defeats Luleå 7–4 to become the sole remaining undefeated team on the season; 19-year old Göteborg goaltender Frida Axell posts 51 save game as Göteborg earn their first point of the season; Ulf Lundberg is announced as new head coach of the Swedish national team

==== October 2020 ====
- The Swedish government announces its intention to relax COVID-19 restrictions, allowing up to 500 spectators for sporting events starting from the 15th of October, but ultimately cancels the relaxations due to a rise in cases
- Göteborg head coach Stefanie McKeough is forced to leave the club and return to Canada due to visa issues; the SDHL launches its webshop
- Emma Nordin is awarded the prize of Assist of the Month for September;
- Linköping pauses club activities after 24 people connected the men's team test positive for COVID-19

==== November 2020 ====
- A brawl erupted in the last minutes of a Modo victory over Leksands, with a total of 176 penalty minutes being assessed, including 5 fighting majors;
- Several Finnish national team players are forced to miss several games while being quarantined under Finnish law after a player tested positive at a national team camp;
- the SDHL announces plans to make it so that at least one out of every four players can be able to play full-time within five years;
- HV71 goaltender Anna Amholt speaks out publicly about being hospitalized again with long covid
- The Swedish government announces a pandemic financial support package for hockey leagues in Sweden

==== December 2020 ====
- Lara Stalder picks up seven points in an 8-2 Brynäs victory over SDE
- Jaycee Magwood scores in overtime to lead Modo to victory and completing a three-goal comeback from 4-1 down against Brynäs
- The day after Christmas, Göteborg pick up their first win of the season, beating Leksands 3-1

==== January 2021 ====
- AIK captain Sabina Küller is suspended for four matches following a headshot against Luleå forward Emma Nordin
- After having retired at the end of the previous season, former Swedish national team captain Emilia Ramboldt makes a comeback with Linköping
- A 13 January match between Modo and SDE is cancelled due to a massive snowstorm in northern Sweden

== Regular season ==
=== Standings ===
Pos	Team	Pld	W	OTW	OTL	L	GF	GA	GD	Pts	Qualification
1	Luleå HF/MSSK	36	32	1	1	2	159	52	+107	99	Qualify for Playoffs
2	Brynäs IF	36	28	1	2	5	168	76	+92	88	Qualify for Playoffs
3	HV71	36	21	4	2	9	137	70	+67	73	Qualify for Playoffs
4	Djurgårdens IF	36	20	3	1	12	92	71	+21	67	Qualify for Playoffs
5	Linköping HC	36	17	3	2	14	89	76	+13	59	Qualify for Playoffs
6	Modo Hockey	36	15	3	1	17	88	88	0	52	Qualify for Playoffs
7	SDE Hockey	36	10	3	3	20	69	96	−27	39	Qualify for Playoffs
8	AIK IF	36	9	0	5	22	60	124	−64	32	Qualify for Playoffs
9	Leksands IF	36	5	2	1	28	52	148	−96	20	Relegation series cancelled, qualify for SDHL 2021-22
10	Göteborg HC	36	3	0	2	31	46	159	−113	11	Relegation series cancelled, qualify for SDHL 2021-22

Updated to match(es) played on 26 February 2021. Source: SDHL.se
Rules for classification: 1) Points; 2) Goal difference; 3) Number of goals scored

=== Statistics ===
==== Scoring leaders ====
The following players lead the league in points at the conclusion of the regular season on 26 February 2021.

	Player	Team	GP	G	A	Pts	PIM
1	Lara Stalder	Brynäs	36	31	51	82	24
2	Kennedy Marchment	HV71	34	28	44	72	14
3	Michela Cava	Luleå/MSSK	36	29	37	66	22
4	Sidney Morin	HV71	36	18	47	65	6
5	Kateřina Mrázová	Brynäs	29	23	40	63	14
6	Emma Nordin	Luleå/MSSK	33	22	36	58	6
7	Michelle Löwenhielm	HV71	36	19	30	49	16
8	Petra Nieminen	Luleå/MSSK	32	24	23	47	16
9	Josefin Bouveng	Brynäs	36	24	23	47	2
10	Jenni Hiirikoski	Luleå/MSSK	34	9	38	47	12

==== Leading goaltenders ====
The following goaltenders led the league in save percentage at the conclusion of the regular season on 26 February 2021, while starting at least one third of matches.

	Player	Team	GP	TOI	W	L	GA	SO	SV%	GAA
1	Stephanie Neatby	Linköping	26	1559:33	12	14	52	5	.943	2.00
2	Sara Grahn	Luleå/MSSK	23	1384:03	21	2	31	4	.936	1.34
3	Klára Peslarová	Modo	27	1622:39	15	12	59	4	.929	2.18
4	Lina Jansson	HV71	17	916:02	15	1	21	6	.924	1.38
5	Alba Gonzalo	HV71	22	1254:36	10	10	45	3	.914	2.15
6	Lindsey Post	SDE	32	1892:01	11	20	84	4	.912	2.66
7	Lovisa Berndtsson	Djurgården	22	1318:55	14	8	43	2	.903	1.96
8	Ellen Jonsson	Brynäs	17	954:07	13	3	31	4	.903	1.95
9	Jule Flötgen	AIK	23	1229:38	7	13	59	3	.902	2.88
10	Eveliina Suonpää	Brynäs	20	1171:07	7	12	62	1	.899	3.18

== Playoffs ==
The 2021 SDHL playoff schedule was announced on 18 February 2021 and featured quarterfinals during 1–4 March, semifinals during 7–12 March, and finals beginning on 15 March and concluding with the Swedish Championship title awarded no later than 1 April. Due to the impact of COVID-19 and the need to curb spread of infection, the order of games in each series was changed to limit the amount of travel for each series. The best-of-three quarterfinals were played A-H-H, with the home advantage (i.e. greater number of home games) granted to the higher seeded team. The best-of-five semifinals and finals were played A-A-H-H-H, with highest rank granted the advantage.

=== Bracket ===
As of 29 March 2021

Quarterfinals
1	Luleå HF/MSSK	2
8	AIK Hockey	0
4	Djurgårdens IF	2
5	Linköping HC	0
2	Brynäs IF	2
7	SDE Hockey	0
3	HV71	2
6	MODO Hockey	0

Semifinals
1	Luleå HF/MSSK	3
4	Djurgårdens IF	1
2	Brynäs IF	3
3	HV71	0

Final
SF1	Luleå HF/MSSK	3
SF2	Brynäs IF	0

=== Quarterfinals ===
AIK – Luleå/MSSK 0–2
1 March 2021	AIK	Luleå/MSSK	0-3 ref
3 March 2021	Luleå/MSSK	AIK	8-2 ref
Luleå HF/MSSK won the series 2–0.

Linköping – Djurgården 0–2
1 March 2021	Linköping	Djurgården	3-7 ref
3 March 2021	Djurgården	Linköping	2-1 ref
Djurgårdens IF Hockey won the series 2–0.

SDE HF – Brynäs 0–2
1 March 2021	SDE HF	Brynäs	0-6 ref
3 March 2021	Brynäs	SDE HF	5-0 ref
Brynäs IF won the series 2–0.

MODO – HV71 0–2
1 March 2021	MODO	HV71	3-4 OT ref
3 March 2021	HV71	MODO	6-2 ref
HV71 won the series 2–0.

=== Semifinals ===
Djurgården – Luleå/MSSK 1–3
7 March 2021	Djurgården	Luleå/MSSK	1-7 ref
8 March 2021	Luleå/MSSK	Djurgården	1-3 ref
10 March 2021	Djurgården	Luleå/MSSK	0-1 ref
11 March 2021	Luleå/MSSK	Djurgården	1-0 ref
Luleå HF/MSSK won the series 3–1.

HV71 – Brynäs 0–3
7 March 2021	HV71	Brynäs	5-6 OT ref
8 March 2021	Brynäs	HV71	3-2 ref
10 March 2021	HV71	Brynäs	0-4 ref
Brynäs IF won the series 3–0.

=== Finals ===
The SDHL Playoff Finals for the Swedish Championship were postponed on 13 March, after a Brynäs player treated positive for COVID-19. Play resumed on 25 March with Brynäs hosting Luleå at Monitor ERP Arena in Gävle.

Game 1: Brynäs took the lead early with an unassisted goal scored by Jalyn Elmes 4:46 into the first period. Luleå evened the score less than a minute later when Emma Nordin netted a goal with assists from Michela Cava and Jenni Hiirikoski. Luleå went on to score five unanswered goals and won the game 6–1. Both Hiirikoski and Cava notched three points in the game, each registering one goal and two assists.

25 March 2021	Brynäs IF Dam	1–6	Luleå HF/MSSK	Monitor ERP Arena, Gävle	Recap
Elmes – 04:46		First period	05:34 – Nordin (Cava, Hiirikoski); 09:15 – Savolainen (Cava, Hiirikoski); 12:30 – Hiirikoski
No scoring		Second period	22:26 – Tulus; 32:38 – Persson (Peterson)
No scoring		Third period	55:14 – EN – Cava (Nieminen)
Eveliina Suonpää ( 7 saves / 12 shots ) Ellen Jonsson ( 15 saves / 15 shots )		Goalie stats	Sara Grahn ( 21 saves / 22 shots )

27 March 2021	Brynäs IF Dam	3–4	OT	Luleå HF/MSSK	Monitor ERP Arena, Gävle	Recap
No scoring		First period		18:05 – Tulus (Sjölund. Vainikka)
No scoring		Second period		No scoring
Marshall (Lindstedt, Grahm) – pp – 51:38; Bouveng (Stalder) – 55:44; Bouveng (Marshall) – 57:54		Third period		53:22 – pp – Nieminen (Nordin); 53:58 – Jensen (Savolainen, Peterson)
No scoring		First overtime period		64:47 – sh – Nieminen (Nordin, Hiirikoski)
Eveliina Suonpää ( 25 saves / 27 shots )		Goalie stats		Sara Grahn ( 24 saves / 29 shots )

29 March 2021	Luleå HF/MSSK	3–2	OT	Brynäs IF Dam	Coop Norrbotten Arena, Luleå	Recap
No scoring		First period		07:31 – pp – Bouveng (Stalder, Mrázová); 10:59 – Bouveng (Stalder, Mrázová)
Tulus (Vainikka, Forsgren) – 38:45		Second period		No scoring
Vainikka (Fällman, Olofsson) – 52:35		Third period		No scoring
Nieminen – 67:52		First overtime period		No scoring
Sara Grahn ( 22 saves / 24 shots )		Goalie stats		Eveliina Suonpää ( 34 saves / 37 shots )

Luleå HF/MSSK won the series 3–0.

== Player awards ==
=== SDHL goal of the week ===
- Week 37, 2020 – Anna Meixner, Brynäs
- Week 38, 2020 – Kayleigh Hamers, SDE
- Week 39, 2020 – Rosa Lindstedt, Brynäs
- Week 40, 2020 – Emma Murén, Brynäs
- Week 41, 2020 – Lara Stalder, Brynäs
- Week 42, 2020 – Ingrid Morset, Linköping
- Week 43, 2020 – Anna Meixner, Brynäs
- Week 44, 2020 – Michela Cava, Luleå/MSSK
- Week 46, 2020 – Michelle Löwenhielm, HV71
- Week 47, 2020 – Lene Tendenes, Linköping
- Week 48, 2020 – Emmy Alasalmi, AIK
- Week 49, 2020 – Nicoline Jensen, Luleå/MSSK
- Week 50, 2020 – Michela Cava, Luleå/MSSK
- Week 53, 2020 – Carly Bullock, Linköping
- Week 1, 2021 – Kennedy Marchment, HV71
- Week 2, 2021 – Emmy Alasalmi, AIK
- Week 3, 2021 – Shae Demale, Leksand
- Week 4, 2021 – Sanni Hakala, HV71
- Week 5, 2021 – Linnéa Johansson, Linköping
- Week 6, 2021 – Erica Udén Johansson, AIK
- Week 7, 2021 – Alice Östensson, Djurgården
- Week 8, 2021 – Sofia Engström, Modo
- Week 9, 2021 – Michela Cava, Luleå/MSSK
- Week 10, 2021: Noora Tulus, Luleå/MSSK

== See also ==
- Women's ice hockey in Sweden
- Damettan
