= Sara Säkkinen =

Finnish ice hockey player

- Born: 7 April 1998 (age 28) Pirkkala, Finland
- Height: 162 cm (5 ft 4 in)
- Weight: 61 kg (134 lb; 9 st 8 lb)
- Position: Forward
- Shoots: Left
- SDHL team Former teams: Djurgårdens IF Hockey: AIK Hockey; Ohio State Buckeyes; Tampereen Ilves; Team Kuortane
- National team: Finland
- Playing career: 2013–present
Medal record
Olympic Games
Bronze medal – third place	2018 Pyeongchang	Ice hockey
World Championship
Bronze medal – third place	2017 United States

Sara Säkkinen (born 7 April 1998) is a Finnish ice hockey forward, currently playing in the Swedish Women's Hockey League (SDHL) with Djurgårdens IF Hockey Dam. Her college ice hockey career was spent with the Ohio State Buckeyes women's ice hockey program in the Western Collegiate Hockey Association (WCHA) conference of the NCAA Division I.

As a member of the Finnish national team she participated in the 2016 IIHF Women's World Championship and won bronze medals at the 2017 IIHF Women's World Championship and 2018 Winter Olympic Games in Pyeongchang.

== Personal life ==
Säkkinen's hometown is Pirkkala.

She holds a bachelor's degree in health sciences from Ohio State University.

She is pursuing a master's degree in Public Health Sciences from Stockholm University.

== See also ==
- List of Finnish women in North American collegiate ice hockey
- List of Olympic women's ice hockey players for Finland
