= Ida Boman =

Swedish ice hockey player (born 2003)

- Born: 1 April 2003 (age 23) Sollentuna, Sweden
- Height: 169 cm (5 ft 7 in)
- Weight: 58 kg (128 lb; 9 st 2 lb)
- Position: Goaltender
- Catches: Left
- SDHL team Former teams: Färjestad BK; Djurgårdens IF
- National team: Sweden
- Playing career: 2019–present
Medal record
World Championship
Bronze medal – third place	2026 Denmark

Ida Boman (born 1 April 2003) is a Swedish ice hockey goaltender for Färjestad BK of the Swedish Women's Hockey League (SDHL) and a member of Sweden women's national ice hockey team. She previously played for Djurgårdens IF of the SDHL.

== Playing career ==
Boman began her career with Djurgårdens IF of the SDHL in the spring of 2019. During the 2021–22 season, in her first full season with Djurgårdens, she appeared in 25 regular season games and posted a 9–15–0 record, with a 1.67 goals against average (GAA) and .907 save percentage. On 28 April 2022, she signed a two-year extension with Djurgårdens. On 27 June 2023, she signed a one-year contract through the 2025 season.

During the 2024–25 season, she appeared in a league-high 29 games, and recorded a 1.55 GAA, a .936 save percentage, and seven shutouts, all career bests. On 9 May 2025, she left Djurgårdens, finishing with 22 shutouts in 130 games.

On 12 May 2025, she signed a two-year contract with Färjestad BK.

== International play ==
On 11 April 2022, Boman was selected to represent Sweden at the 2022 Winter Olympics, where she made her senior national team debut. On 13 August 2022, she was selected to represent Sweden at the 2022 IIHF Women's World Championship where she made her IIHF Women's World Championship debut.
