= Emma Polusny =

American ice hockey player

- Born: March 16, 1999 (age 27) Minnetrista, Minnesota, US
- Height: 5 ft 9 in (175 cm)
- Weight: 163 lb (74 kg; 11 st 9 lb)
- Position: Goaltender
- Catches: Left
- SDHL team Former teams: Leksands IF; St. Cloud State Huskies
- National team: United States
- Playing career: 2017–present
Medal record
World Championship
Gold medal – first place	2019 Finland

Emma Polusny (born March 16, 1999) is an American ice hockey goaltender, currently playing in the Swedish Women's Hockey League (SDHL) with Leksands IF Dam. As a member of the United States national team, she won a gold medal at the 2019 IIHF Women's World Championship.

Her college ice hockey career was played with the St. Cloud State Huskies women's ice hockey program in the Western Collegiate Hockey Association (WCHA) conference of the NCAA Division I during 2017 to 2022.
