= AIK Hockey (women) =

NDHL ice hockey team in Stockholm

- City: Solna, Stockholm, Sweden
- League: NDHL
- Founded: 1998
- Home arena: Ritorps Ishall
- Colors: Black, yellow
- General manager: Conny Olausson
- Head coach: Conny Olausson
- Captain: Vilma Nilsson

Championships
- SDHL regular season titles: 1 (2008)
- SDHL championships: 2 (2009, 2013)

AIK Hockey or AIK IF is a semi-professional ice hockey team in the Nationella Damhockeyligan (NDHL). They play in the Solna Municipality of Stockholm, Sweden at Ritorps Ishall (also known as the ishall of Ulriksdals idrottsplats, lit. 'Ulriksdal sports ground(s)').

AIK Hockey are two time champions of the Swedish Women's Hockey League (SDHL), the top flight of Swedish's women's ice hockey, which the team played in from 2008 until being relegated in the post-season of the 2023–24 SDHL season.

== History ==
AIK gained promotion to Riksserien (renamed SDHL in 2016) in 2008. They won the Swedish Championship twice in their first five top-flight seasons, in 2009 and 2013.

In 2017, the team participated in the Minnesota Whitecaps' tour of Stockholm, playing against them on 22 August.

After dropping in the standings again, down to 7th in the 2017–18 season, Jared Cipparone was brought in to take over as head coach for the club. That summer, the club also slightly increased its investment in its women's side, building a new locker room for the women.

On the 22 February 2020, AIK was eliminated by Djurgårdens IF Hockey in the playoff quarterfinals in a match that went to the third overtime period, passing 100 minutes of game-time and setting an SDHL record for the longest match. After the end of the season, 8th-leading scorer in SDHL history Fanny Rask decided to retire from hockey, citing frustration with the financial insecurity in women's hockey.

== Season-by-season record ==
This is a partial list of the most recent seasons completed by AIK.

Code explanation: GP—Games played, W—Wins, L—Losses, T—Tied games, GF—Goals for, GA—Goals against, Pts—Points. Top Scorer: Points (Goals+Assists)

Season	League	Regular season										Post season results
Season	League	Finish	GP	W	OTW	OTL	L	GF	GA	Pts	Top scorer	Post season results
2015-16	SDHL	3rd	36	21	3	3	9	95	61	72	(Sweden) L. Johansson 45 (28+17)	Lost semifinals against Luleå HF/MSSK
2016-17	SDHL	5th	36	16	3	1	16	88	82	55	(Norway) L. Bialik Øien 44 (22+22)	Lost quarterfinals against Linköping HC
2017-18	SDHL	7th	36	10	0	4	22	74	108	34	(Sweden) L. Johansson 39 (23+16)	Lost quarterfinals against Linköping HC
2018-19	SDHL	8th	36	9	3	3	21	73	102	36	(Sweden) L. Johansson 25 (14+11)	Lost quarterfinals against Luleå HF/MSSK
2019-20	SDHL	5th	36	14	3	1	18	73	97	49	(Sweden) L. Johansson 28 (13+15)	Lost quarterfinals against Djurgårdens IF Hockey
2020-21	SDHL	8th	36	9	0	5	22	60	124	32	(Sweden) L. Johansson 23 (11+12)	Lost quarterfinals against Luleå HF/MSSK
2021-22	SDHL	9th	36	9	3	4	20	69	91	37	(Sweden) L. Johansson 26 (18+8)	Saved in relegation
2022-23	SDHL	9th	32	4	1	3	24	44	127	17	(Czech Republic) A. Sarnovská 13 (5+8)	Saved in relegation
2023-24	SDHL	10th	36	1	2	0	33	39	197	7	(Sweden) I. Leijonhielm 13 (9+4)	Relegated, lost qualifiers to Skellefeå AIK (0–2)

== Players and personnel ==
=== 2023–24 SDHL roster ===
As of 14 February 2024

No.	Nat	Player	Pos	S/G	Age	Acquired	Birthplace
21	(Sweden)	Emmy Alasalmi	D	R	32	2023	Stockholm, Sweden
27	(United States)	Rebecca Brown	F	R	27	2023	Steamboat Springs, Colorado, United States
14	(Czech Republic)	Nikola Dýcková	F	L	25	2023	
20	(Sweden)	Wilma Hallberg	F	L	20	2021	Stockholm, Södermanland, Sweden
26	(Sweden)	Alva Hellqvist	D	L	23	2021	
11	(Austria)	Emma Hofbauer	F	R	21	2023	Innsbruck, Tyrol, Austria
35	(Norway)	Linnea Holterud Olsson	G	L	29	2023	Kongsvinger, Innlandet, Norway
8	(Slovakia)	Iveta Klimášová	F	R	28	2024	Prakovce, Košický kraj, Slovakia
12	(Sweden)	Tuva Kärrhage	F	L	21	2022	
18	(Sweden)	Isabelle Leijonhielm	F	L	19	2021	Täby, Uppland, Sweden
22	(Sweden)	Felicia Levin	F	L	22	2020	
3	(Japan)	Suzu Matsuya	D	L	28	2023	Kobe, Japan
49	(Sweden)	Elinah Melinder	G	L	22	2019	Märsta, Uppland, Sweden
25	(Lithuania)	Klara Miuller	F	L	22	2023	Klaipėda, Mažoji Lietuva, Lithuania
6	(Japan)	Mei Miura	F	R	27	2023	Hokkaido, Japan
24	(Sweden)	Vilma Nilsson (C)	F	L	23	2018	Umeå, Västerbotten, Sweden
34	(Canada)	Emily Rickwood	D	L	25	2023	Brantford, Ontario, Canada
23	(Japan)	Fumika Sasano	F	L	28	2023	Aomori, Japan
7	(Sweden)	Ella Sköldebäck	D	R	21	2023	Stockholm, Sweden
9	(Sweden)	Moa Söderholm	D	L	22	2020	
30	(Czech Republic)	Blanka Škodová	G	L	28	2023	Šternberk, Olomoucký kraj, Czechia
10	(Japan)	Hikaru Yamashita	F	L	25	2023	
29	(Sweden)	Elsa Åberg	D	L	19	2023	Danderyd, Uppland, Sweden
19	(Sweden)	Felicia Öhrqvist	D	L	21	2020	Solna, Uppland, Sweden

Coaching staff and team personnel

- Head coach: Olle Öhrqvist
- Assistant coach: Rebeka Sádecká
- Goaltending coach: Linus Appelgren
- Physical therapist: Hanna Pintér
- Equipment manager: Göran Broberg & Ernst Melinder
