= HV71 (women) =

SDHL ice hockey team in Jönköping, Sweden

- City: Jönköping, Sweden
- League: SDHL
- Founded: 2002
- Home arena: Husqvarna Garden
- Colors: Blue, yellow, white
- General manager: Chris Abbott
- Head coach: Thomas Pettersen
- Captain: Elin Svensson
- Parent club: HV71
- Website: hv71.se

Franchise history
- 2002–2008: Jönköpings IF Queens
- 2008–2012: HV71 Queens
- 2012–present: HV71

Championships
- Regular season titles: 1 (2020)

HV71 (abbreviated from Husqvarna Vätterstad 1971) are a semi-professional ice hockey team in the Swedish Women's Hockey League (SDHL). They play in Jönköping, in the southern Swedish province of Småland, at Husqvarna Garden.

== History ==
The club was originally formed independently in March 2002 as Jönköpings IF Queens, after neither local professional men's teams – HV71 of the Swedish Hockey League nor HC Dalen of Hockeyettan – were willing to start women's divisions. The club's logo was designed by 18-year old Swedish-Iranian refugee Behnaz Bahabozorgi, who served as the club's chairperson, and the team practiced on an outdoor rink on Saturdays. They began play in the 2003–04 Damettan season, finishing last in the southern division. In April 2008, as the club had grown to the point of adding a B-team and a youth department, Jönköpings IF Queens decided to merge with the HV71 organisation, becoming the HV71 Queens from 1 August the same year.

In 2012, the club earned promotion to the SDHL for the first time. For their first top-division season, the club dropped the "Queens" from their name, playing only as HV71. They finished last place in the 2012–13 season, and were relegated back to Damettan. The club made it to the promotion playoffs in 2013–14, but lost. The following season, after the HV71 board decided to substantially increase investment into the women's side, more than doubling the club's budget and making big signings such as Jenni Asserholt and Fanny Rask, the team earned promotion back to the SDHL. In 2016–17, the club was able to reach the SDHL playoff finals, but lost against Djurgårdens IF.

In the 2019–20 SDHL season, HV71 finished on top of the league table for the first time in club history, setting a SDHL record for most regular season points with 99. Halfway through the season, head coach Lucas Frey was fired due to engaging in inappropriate relationship with one player of the team and was replaced by assistant coach Joakim Engström. The team reached the SDHL playoff finals for the second time in club history, but the finals versus Luleå were cancelled due to the COVID-19 pandemic in Sweden. HV71 had a 1-0 lead and needed only win one more game to win the championship. Hours before the second game Luleå team staff claimed to have two cases of COVID-19, players being defender Johanna Fällman and goalie Sara Grahn. No proof of symptoms or test results was ever provided by Luleå and, shortly after, the finals were canceled Luleå management stated to local media NSD that no players in fact ever had symptoms of COVID-19.

== Season-by-season results ==
This is a partial list of the most recent seasons completed by HV71.
Code explanation: GP—Games played, W—Wins, OTW—Overtime wins, T—Overtime losses, L—Losses, GF—Goals for, GA—Goals against, Pts—Points. Top Scorer: Points (Goals+Assists)

Season	League	Regular season										Post season results
Season	League	Finish	GP	W	OTW	OTL	L	GF	GA	Pts	Top scorer	Post season results
2015-16	Riksserien	6th	36	13	6	1	16	90	109	52	(Sweden) F. Rask 40 (16+24)	Lost quarterfinal to Linköping
2016-17	SDHL	4th	36	15	4	5	12	89	67	58	(Sweden) F. Rask 39 (20+19)	Lost final to Djurgården
2017-18	SDHL	5th	36	15	1	3	17	94	100	50	(Finland) R. Sallinen 47 (15+32)	Lost quarterfinal to Djurgården
2018-19	SDHL	5th	36	20	0	4	12	118	70	64	(Finland) R. Sallinen 51 (14+37)	Lost semifinal to Luleå
2019-20	SDHL	1st	36	32	2	1	1	170	52	99	(Canada) K. Marchment 64 (32+32)	Cancelled due to COVID-19 pandemic
2020-21	SDHL	3rd	36	21	4	2	9	137	70	73	(Canada) K. Marchment 72 (28+44)	Lost semifinal to Brynäs
2021-22	SDHL	4th	36	20	3	2	11	123	95	68	(Canada) S. Bujold 34 (20+14)	Lost semifinal to Brynäs
2022-23	SDHL	8th	32	4	5	2	21	67	115	24	(Sweden) E. Svensson 27 (13+14)	Lost quarterfinal to Luleå
2023-24	SDHL	9th	36	8	2	6	20	82	139	34	(Sweden) E. Svensson 30 (20+10)	Saved in relegation

== Players and personnel ==
=== 2024–25 roster ===
As of 12 January 2025

No.	Nat	Player	Pos	S/G	Age	Acquired	Birthplace
21	(Sweden)	Amanda Andersson	RW	L	27	2023	
16	(Sweden)	Kajsa Armborg (A)	D	L	27	2021	Örebro, Närke, Sweden
14	(Sweden)	Evelina Arvidsson	F	R	19	2023	Skellefteå, Västerbotten, Sweden
22	(Canada)	Kennedy Bobyck	F	L	25	2024	Regina, Saskatchewan, Canada
27	(Canada)	Teghan Inglis	D	R	24	2024	Okotoks, Alberta, Canada
25	(Sweden)	Alva Johansson	C	R	19	2023	Lagan, Småland, Sweden
17	(Sweden)	Aoife Leacy	F	L	22	2023	Dublin, Leinster, Ireland
12	(Sweden)	Eimear Leacy	F	L	19	2023	Dublin, Leinster, Ireland
24	(Sweden)	Ella Lind	D	R	19	2023	Guangxi, China
4	(Sweden)	Malva Lindgren	D	L	18	2024	Karlskoga, Värmland, Sweden
13	(United States)	Julia Nearis	F	R	26	2024	Beverly, Massachusetts, United States
10	(Norway)	Tea Løkke Nyberg	F	L	22	2023	Trondheim, Trøndelag, Norway
18	(Finland)	Emmi Rakkolainen	F	L	29	2023	Helsinki, Uusimaa, Finland
9	(Sweden)	Jenna Raunio	D	L	19	2022	Jönköping, Småland, Sweden
19	(Czech Republic)	Klára Seroiszková	D	L	25	2022	Karviná, Moravskoslezský kraj, Czechia
11	(Sweden)	Alva Solberg	D	L	23	2024	
78	(Sweden)	Elin Svensson (C)	LW	L	23	2020	Nässjö, Småland, Sweden
8	(Sweden)	Hilda Svensson	F	L	19	2022	Oskarshamn, Småland, Sweden
30	(Czech Republic)	Viktorie Švejdová	G	L	23	2024	Brno, Jihomoravský kraj, Czechia
88	(Sweden)	Lina van Noort	G	L	27	2015	Vagnsunda, Uppland, Sweden
15	(Canada)	Audrey-Anne Veillette	F	R	25	2024	Drummondville, Quebec, Canada
72	(Canada)	Rachel Weiss	F	R	25	2024	Calgary, Alberta, Canada

Coaching staff and team personnel

- Head coach: Thomas Pettersen
- Assistant coach: Alexander Hanning
- Goaltending coach: Emil Karnatz
- Development coach: Kris Beech
- Equipment manager: Dan Eriksson

=== Team captains ===
- Jenni Asserholt, 2015–2017
- Riikka Sallinen, 2017–2019
- Jessica Healey, 2019–20
- Sidney Morin, 2020–21
- Hanna Olsson, 2021–22
- Sanni Hakala, 2022–November 2023
- Elin Svensson, December 2023–

=== Head coaches ===
- Tony Almsgård, 2002–2010
- Ulf Johansson, 2013–2018
- Lucas Frey, 2018–19
- Joakim Engström, 2019–2022
- Peter Hammarström & Axel Nyberg, 2022–23
- Ulf Hall, 2023–24
- Thomas Pettersen, 2024–

== Franchise records and leaders ==
=== All-time scoring leaders ===
The top regular season point scorers (goals + assists) in HV71 history through the conclusion of the 2023–24 SDHL season.

Note: Nat = Nationality; Pos = Position; GP = Games played; G = Goals; A = Assists; Pts = Points; P/G = Points per game

Points
Nat	Player	Pos	GP	G	A	Pts	P/G
(Sweden)	Maja Jakobsson	W	185	115	86	201	1.09
(Finland)	Sanni Hakala	W	226	98	96	194	0.86
(Canada)	Kennedy Marchment	RW	70	60	76	136	1.94
(Sweden)	Fanny Rask	LW	139	52	75	127	0.91
(Finland)	Riikka Sallinen	C	92	39	80	119	1.29
(Canada)	Sidney Morin	D	72	33	81	114	1.58
(Sweden)	Michelle Claesson	C	209	55	42	97	0.46
(Canada)	Danielle Stone	C/RW	128	41	42	83	0.65
(Sweden)	Hanna Olsson	C	67	34	47	81	1.21
(Sweden)	Felizia Wikner Zienkiewicz	LW	142	46	33	79	0.56
(Sweden)	Michelle Löwenhielm	C	72	33	46	79	1.10
(Canada)	Jess Healey	D	105	21	58	79	0.75
