= 2023–24 Euro Hockey Tour (women) =

International ice hockey tournament season

Tournament details
- Host countries: Finland; Germany; Sweden; Czechia
- Dates: 3 Nations in Vierumäki; 22–27 August 2023; Deutschland Cup; 8–11 November 2023; 5 Nations in Falun; 13–17 December 2023; EHT Finals in Liberec; 7–11 February 2024
- Format: Round-robin
- Teams: 6

Tournament statistics
- Games played: 32
- Goals scored: 179 (5.59 per game)
- Attendance: 23,037 (720 per game)
- Scoring leaders: 3 Nations in Vierumäki; (Czech Republic) Denisa Křížová (6); Deutschland Cup; (Czech Republic) Kateřina Mrázová (6); (Finland) Petra Nieminen (6); 5 Nations in Falun; (Switzerland) Lara Stalder (6); (Finland) Noora Tulus (6); EHT Finals in Liberec; (Czech Republic) Tereza Vanišová (8)

The 2023–24 Euro Hockey Tour was the fourth season of the Euro Hockey Tour (EHT) since the revision and expansion of the tournament format in 2018.

The season comprised four tournaments, hosted in Finland, Germany, Sweden, and Czechia, respectively. The national teams of Czechia, Denmark, Finland, Germany, Sweden, and Switzerland each participated in at least one of the tournaments; Czechia and Finland were the only teams to participate in all four events.

== Three Nations Tournament in Vierumäki ==
The 2022–23 season began with the EHT Tournament in Vierumäki and Lahti in Finland from 22 to 27 August 2023. The national teams of Czechia, Finland, and Sweden participated in the tournament. Five matches were held at the Finnish Institute of Sport in Vierumäki – four games at its secondary rink, Vierumäki 2, and one at its principal rink, Vierumäen jäähalli (lit. 'Vierumäki ice hall'). The match between Finland and Czechia on 25th August was played at Isku Areena in Lahti and drew a crowd of 871 spectators.

Czechia claimed the first tournament victory of the season, recording just one loss across four games. Finland recorded one win and one loss against each opponent to finish in second place, and Sweden placed third with one victory.

Czech left-winger Denisa Křížová was the top scorer of the tournament, notching 6 points on 5 goals and an assist. Křížová's linemates, centre Michaela Pejzlová and right-winger Tereza Vanišová, ranked second and third in tournament scoring, respectively. In total, the tournament's top ten scorers featured four Czech players; four Finnish players, led by Petra Nieminen (3+1); and two Swedes, led by Sara Hjalmarsson (3+1).

Of goaltenders playing at least one-third of their team's minutes, Emma Söderberg of Sweden topped the charts with a 93.1 save percentage (S-%) and 2.04 goals against average (GAA) across nearly 118 minutes of play. Finnish goaltender Tiia Pajarinen posted the best save percentage and goals against average of all goaltenders who recorded time in net and achieved the only shutout of the tournament in her one game played.

=== Standings ===
| Pos | Team | Pld | W | OTW | OTL | L | GF | GA | GD | Pts |
|---|---|---|---|---|---|---|---|---|---|---|
| 1 | Czechia | 4 | 3 | 0 | 0 | 1 | 17 | 12 | +5 | 9 |
| 2 | Finland (H) | 4 | 2 | 0 | 0 | 2 | 10 | 14 | −4 | 6 |
| 3 | Sweden | 4 | 1 | 0 | 0 | 3 | 9 | 10 | −1 | 3 |

Source: Finnish Ice Hockey Association
(H) Host

=== Results ===
All times local, Eastern European Summer Time (UTC+03:00)

| 22 August 2023; 17:00 | Czechia | 4–5 (1–1, 2–2, 1–2) | Finland | Vierumäki 2, Vierumäki; Attendance: 40 |

Blanka Škodová
Goalies
Anni Keisala
Referees:
Atte Alastalo
Kalle Mikkonen
Linesmen:
Ilona Silander
Oskari Piironen

| Křížová – 03:38 | 1–0 |
| | 1–1 | 17:02 – Vainikka (Nieminen, Karjalainen) |
| | 1–2 | 22:53 – Laitinen (Vainikka, Vanhanen) (PP) |
| Křížová (Sarnovská, Pejzlová) (PP) – 26:16 | 2–2 |
| Křížová (Vanišová, Tejralová) (PP) – 29:58 | 3–2 |
| | 3–3 | 36:22 – Liikala (Nylund) |
| | 3–4 | 41:42 – Yrjänen (Pirttijärvi) |
| | 3–5 | 46:20 – Nieminen (Vanhanen) (PP) |
| Pejzlová (Pejšová, Lásková) – 52:23 | 4–5 |

6 min
Penalties
12 min
17
Shots
27

| 23 August 2023; 17:00 | Sweden | 0–2 (0–0, 0–1, 0–1) | Finland | Vierumäki 2, Vierumäki; Attendance: 45 |

| Emma Söderberg | Goalies | Tiia Pajarinen | Referees: Reetta-Kaisa Lusi; Anniina Nurmi; Linesmen: Arttu Sopanen; Henri Uotila |
| 0–1 / 32:57 – Nieminen (Vainikka, Vanhanen) (PP); 0–2 / 59:34 – Vainikka (Liikala) (EN) | | | Referees: Reetta-Kaisa Lusi; Anniina Nurmi; Linesmen: Arttu Sopanen; Henri Uotila |
| 8 min | Penalties | 0 min | Referees: Reetta-Kaisa Lusi; Anniina Nurmi; Linesmen: Arttu Sopanen; Henri Uotila |
| 11 | Shots | 32 | Referees: Reetta-Kaisa Lusi; Anniina Nurmi; Linesmen: Arttu Sopanen; Henri Uotila |

| 24 August 2023; 17:00 | Sweden | 3–4 (2–1, 0–3, 1–0) | Czechia | Vierumäki 2, Vierumäki; Attendance: 20 |

Tindra Holm
Goalies
Michaela Hesová
Referees:
Markus Peltola
Lauri Knuuttila
Linesmen:
Juho Kovanen
Topias Tahkola

| Hjalmarsson (Nylén Persson) (PP) – 03:13 | 1–0 |
| Kjellbin (T. Johansson) (PP) – 08:35 | 2–0 |
| | 2–1 | 09:55 – Lásková (Sarnovská, Pejšová) |
| | 2–2 | 28:58 – Křížová (Pejzlová, Tejralová) (PP2) |
| | 2–3 | 29:33 – Mrázová (Mlýnková) (PP) |
| | 2–4 | 35:49 – Sarnovská (Pejzlová, Tejralová) (PP) |
| Bouveng (Lidman) – 58:52 | 3–4 |

10 min
Penalties
12 min
20
Shots
23

| 25 August 2023; 17:00 | Finland | 2–6 (0–3, 1–2, 1–1) | Czechia | Isku Areena, Lahti; Attendance: 871 |

Emilia Kyrkkö
Anni Keisala
Goalies
Viktorie Švejdová
Referees:
Henna Åberg
Reetta-Kaisa Lusi
Linesmen:
Helinä Anttila
Tiina Saarimäki

| | 0–1 | 03:49 – Vanišová (Křížová, Radová) |
| | 0–2 | 13:20 – Vanišová |
| | 0–3 | 14:18 – Neubauerová (Mrázová, Mlýnková) |
| Savolainen (Hiirikoski) – 25:09 | 1–3 |
| | 1–4 | 25:25 – Mlýnková (Čajanová, Seroiszková) |
| | 1–5 | 33:27 – Šapovalivová |
| Nylund (Karjalainen, Liikala) – 54:29 | 2–5 |
| | 2–6 | 59:57 – Radová (SH, EN) |

2 min
Penalties
8 min
27
Shots
23

| 26 August 2023; 14:30 | Finland | 1–4 (1–1, 0–2, 0–1) | Sweden | Vierumäen jäähalli, Vierumäki; Attendance: 60 |

Anni Keisala
Goalies
Ida Boman
Referees:
Henna Åberg
Reetta-Kaisa Lusi
Linesmen:
Helinä Anttila
Tiina Saarimäki

| Nieminen (Karjalainen, Vanhanen) – 11:51 | 1–0 |
| | 1–1 | 12:38 – Hjalmarsson (Ljungblom, Östensson) |
| | 1–2 | 39:03 – T. Johansson (Thuvik) (PP) |
| | 1–3 | 39:35 – Svensson (Antonsson) |
| | 1–4 | 55:59 – Ljungblom (Östensson) (EN) |

4 min
Penalties
8 min
34
Shots
24

| 27 August 2023; 13:00 | Czechia | 3–2 (2–0, 1–1, 0–1) | Sweden | Vierumäki 2, Vierumäki; Attendance: 20 |

Blanka Škodová
Michaela Hesová
Goalies
Emma Söderberg
Referees:
Lassi Silván
Nikita Nikolajevs
Linesmen:
Niko Kalliolepo
Mark Seres

| Radová (Mrázová) (PP) – 02:26 | 1–0 |
| Křížová (Pejzlová, Vanišová) – 08:10 | 2–0 |
| Vanišová (Pejzlová, Pejšová) – 24:55 | 3–0 |
| | 3–1 | 34:52 – Hjalmarsson (Östensson, Ljungblom) |
| | 3–2 | 45:41 – Ljungblom (Hjalmarsson) |

6 min
Penalties
8 min
26
Shots
26

Top scorers

| | Player | GP | G | A | Pts | PIM |
|---|---|---|---|---|---|---|
| (Czech Republic) | Denisa Křížová | 4 | 5 | 1 | 6 | 2 |
| (Czech Republic) | Michaela Pejzlová | 4 | 1 | 5 | 6 | 0 |
| (Czech Republic) | Tereza Vanišová | 3 | 3 | 2 | 5 | 4 |
| (Sweden) | Sara Hjalmarsson | 4 | 3 | 1 | 4 | 4 |
| (Finland) | Petra Nieminen | 4 | 3 | 1 | 4 | 4 |
| (Finland) | Viivi Vainikka | 4 | 2 | 2 | 4 | 0 |
| (Sweden) | Lina Ljungblom | 4 | 2 | 2 | 4 | 4 |
| (Finland) | Sanni Vanhanen | 4 | 0 | 4 | 4 | 0 |
| (Czech Republic) | Tereza Radová | 4 | 2 | 1 | 3 | 0 |
| (Finland) | Julia Liikala | 3 | 1 | 2 | 3 | 0 |

Source: Finnish Ice Hockey Association

Goaltenders

| | Player | GP | TOI | SA | GA | SO | S-% | GAA |
|---|---|---|---|---|---|---|---|---|
| (Finland) | Tiia Pajarinen | 1 | 60:00 | 11 | 0 | 1 | 100 | 0.00 |
| (Sweden) | Ida Boman | 1 | 60:00 | 34 | 1 | 0 | 97.1 | 1.00 |
| (Sweden) | Emma Söderberg | 2 | 117:43 | 58 | 4 | 0 | 93.1 | 2.04 |
| (Czech Republic) | Viktorie Švejdová | 1 | 60:00 | 27 | 2 | 0 | 92.6 | 2.00 |
| (Czech Republic) | Michaela Hesová | 2 | 90:16 | 39 | 5 | 0 | 87.2 | 3.32 |
| (Czech Republic) | Blanka Škodová | 2 | 88:34 | 32 | 5 | 0 | 85.3 | 3.39 |
| (Finland) | Anni Keisala | 3 | 141:37 | 51 | 8 | 0 | 84.3 | 3.39 |
| (Sweden) | Tindra Holm | 1 | 58:46 | 23 | 4 | 0 | 82.6 | 4.08 |
| (Finland) | Emilia Kyrkkö | 1 | 29:40 | 11 | 4 | 0 | 63.6 | 8.09 |

Source: Finnish Ice Hockey Association

=== Player awards ===
Players of the Game

- CZE v FIN: Denisa Křížová (CZE), unknown (FIN)
- SWE v FIN: Mira Jungåker (SWE), Tiia Pajarinen (FIN)
- SWE v CZE: Sara Hjalmarsson (SWE), Natálie Mlýnková (CZE)
- FIN v CZE: Ronja Savolainen (FIN), Tereza Vanišová (CZE)
- FIN v SWE: Petra Nieminen (FIN), Ida Boman (SWE)
- CZE v SWE: Michaela Pejzlová (CZE), Lina Ljungblom (SWE)

== Deutschland Cup ==
The second event of the season was a four-nations tournament held as part of the 2023 Deutschland Cup and played from 8 to 11 November 2023 at Fanatec Arena in Landshut, Germany. It was the inaugural women's tournament of the Deutschland Cup, which had previously included only a men's tournament since its establishment in 1987. The national teams of Czechia, Denmark, Finland, and Germany participated in the women's tournament.

Czechia swept the tournament – allowing just two goals against across three games played and recording two shutouts – to claim the first Deutschland Cup for women. Finland ranked second, with one loss and two wins. Germany placed third with one victory and Denmark concluded the tournament in last place with zero goals scored across three games.

Czech centre Kateřina Mrázová and Finnish winger Petra Nieminen tied as top scorers of the Deutschland Cup, both scoring 3 goals and 3 assists for 6 points in three games. The tournament’s list of top-twenty scorers exclusively featured Czech and Finnish players, and the top-ten table included a balance of five Czechs and five Finns. The leading goalscorer was winger Noemi Neubauerová of Czechia, with four goals, and the assist's leader was winger Julia Liikala of Finland, with five assists. Tied at twenty-third overall on the tournament scoring list, German right-winger Theresa Wagner was the host country’s leading scorer, with one goal in two games played; left-winger Jennifer Miller was the only other German to notch a goal.

Viktorie Švejdová topped the goaltending charts with zero goals against across 80 minutes in net. Her perfect record was matched by Finland’s Tiia Pajarinen, who also achieved 0.00 goals against average and a shutout across 60 minutes in net. Denmark’s best goalie was Caroline Thomsen, who faced 80 shots on goal – 28 more than any other goaltender – while maintaining a solid 92.5 save percentage across nearly 119 minutes in net.

=== Standings ===
| Pos | Team | Pld | W | OTW | OTL | L | GF | GA | GD | Pts |
|---|---|---|---|---|---|---|---|---|---|---|
| 1 | Czechia | 3 | 3 | 0 | 0 | 0 | 17 | 2 | +15 | 9 |
| 2 | Finland | 3 | 2 | 0 | 0 | 1 | 18 | 5 | +13 | 6 |
| 3 | Germany (H) | 3 | 1 | 0 | 0 | 2 | 2 | 16 | −14 | 3 |
| 4 | Denmark | 3 | 0 | 0 | 0 | 3 | 0 | 14 | −14 | 0 |

Source: Finnish Ice Hockey Association
(H) Host

=== Results ===
All times are local, Central European Time (UTC+1).

| 8 November 2023; 17:15 | Czechia | 4–2 (3–0, 0–1, 1–1) | Finland | Fanatec Arena, Landshut; Attendance: 300 |

Klára Peslarová
Goalies
Anni Keisala
Referees:
Vanessa Anselm
Tijana Haack
Linesmen:
Lara Fischer
Julia Struber

| Neubauerová (Šapovalivová) – 07:20 | 1–0 |
| Křížová (Mrázová, Pejšová) – 12:05 | 2–0 |
| Pejzlová (Vanišová) – 18:02 | 3–0 |
| | 3–1 | 32:18 – Savander (Salonen, Yrjölä) |
| | 3–2 | 45:26 – Nylund (Liikala) (PP) |
| Šapovalivová (Lásková) (EN) – 59:57 | 4–2 |

14 min
Penalties
8 min
22
Shots
18

| 8 November 2023; 20:45 | Germany | 1–0 (0–0, 1–0, 0–0) | Denmark | Fanatec Arena, Landshut; Attendance: 1,028 |

| Sandra Abstreiter | Goalies | Caroline Thomsen | Referees: Julia Kainberger; Svenja Strohmenger; Linesmen: Marine Diant; Leonie Ernst |
| Miller (Häckelsmiller, Schmitz) – 28:24 / 1–0 | | | Referees: Julia Kainberger; Svenja Strohmenger; Linesmen: Marine Diant; Leonie Ernst |
| 6 min | Penalties | 6 min | Referees: Julia Kainberger; Svenja Strohmenger; Linesmen: Marine Diant; Leonie Ernst |
| 29 | Shots | 13 | Referees: Julia Kainberger; Svenja Strohmenger; Linesmen: Marine Diant; Leonie Ernst |

| 9 November 2023; 17:15 | Finland | 8–0 (1–0, 2–0, 5–0) | Denmark | Fanatec Arena, Landshut; Attendance: 520 |

Tiia Pajarinen
Goalies
Caroline Bjergstad
Referees:
Vanessa Anselm
Svenja Stohmenger
Linesmen:
Marine Diant
Julia Strube

| Savolainen (Vanhanen, Liikala) – 06:52 | 1–0 |
| Nieminen (Vanhanen, Liikala) – 24:11 | 2–0 |
| Nieminen (Hiirikoski, Liikala) – 39:37 | 3–0 |
| Savolainen (Nieminen) – 41:13 | 4–0 |
| Nieminen (Vanhanen, Savolainen) – 43:03 | 5–0 |
| Täks (Hiirikoski, Schalin) – 48:21 | 6–0 |
| Täks (Rantala, Nylund) – 53:01 | 7–0 |
| Tulus (Yrjölä, Nieminen) (PP) – 59:48 | 8–0 |

2 min
Penalties
12 min
52
Shots
7

| 10 November 2023; 16:00 | Czechia | 5–0 (2–0, 1–0, 2–0) | Denmark | Fanatec Arena, Landshut; Attendance: 308 |

Viktorie Švejdová
Goalies
Caroline Thomsen
Referees:
Svenja Strohmenger
Julia Kainberger
Linesmen:
Leonie Ernst
Lara Fischer

| Vanišová (Křížová, Seroiszková) – 03:28 | 1–0 |
| Plosová (Mrázová, Pištěková) – 04:42 | 2–0 |
| Mrázová (Jůzková, Lásková) – 35:26 | 3–0 |
| Neubauerová (Mrázová) – 43:32 | 4–0 |
| Mrázová (Neubauerová) – 50:07 | 5–0 |

4 min
Penalties
10 min
51
Shots
10

| 10 November 2023; 20:00 | Germany | 1–8 (0–2, 0–4, 1–2) | Finland | Fanatec Arena, Landshut; Attendance: 1,667 |

Chiara Schultes
Goalies
Anni Keisala
Referees:
Vanessa Anselm
Tijana Haack
Linesmen:
Marine Diant
Julia Strube

| | 0–1 | 10:00 – Vanhanen (Liikala, Rantala) |
| | 0–2 | 13:56 – Tulus (Salonen, Savolainen) |
| | 0–3 | 22:57 – Vainikka (Tulus) (SH) |
| | 0–4 | 24:10 – Salonen (Savolainen, Yrjänen) (SH) |
| | 0–5 | 28:12 – Liikala (SH) |
| | 0–6 | 33:04 – Kaila (Salonen, Montonen) |
| | 0–7 | 40:22 – Tulus (Nylund) |
| Wagner (Kluge) – 49:05 | 1–7 |
| | 1–8 | 49:25 – Yrjänen (K. Seikkula, Koukkula) |

4 min
Penalties
14 min
11
Shots
30

| 11 November 2023; 15:30 | Germany | 0–8 (0–3, 0–1, 0–4) | Czechia | Fanatec Arena, Landshut; Attendance: 3,007 |

Sandra Abstreiter
Goalies
Klára Peslarová
Viktorie Švejdová
Referees:
Tijana Haack
Julia Kainberger
Linesmen:
Leonie Ernst
Lara Fischer

| 0–1 | 05:47 – Neubauerová (Šapovalivová) (PP) |
| 0–2 | 08:24 – Čajanová (Křížová) |
| 0–3 | 19:45 – Křížová (Lásková, Seroiszková) |
| 0–4 | 39:13 – Přibylová (Tejralová, Plosová) |
| 0–5 | 40:44 – Křížová |
| 0–6 | 49:49 – Neubauerová |
| 0–7 | 50:45 – Plosová (Pištěková) |
| 0–8 | 56:33 – Mrázová (Pejšová, Šapovalivová) (PP) |

16 min
Penalties
6 min
22
Shots
34

Top scorers

| | Player | GP | G | A | Pts | PIM |
|---|---|---|---|---|---|---|
| (Czech Republic) | Kateřina Mrázová | 3 | 3 | 3 | 6 | 2 |
| (Finland) | Petra Nieminen | 3 | 3 | 3 | 6 | 2 |
| (Finland) | Julia Liikala | 3 | 1 | 5 | 6 | 0 |
| (Czech Republic) | Noemi Neubauerová | 3 | 4 | 1 | 5 | 0 |
| (Czech Republic) | Denisa Křížová | 3 | 3 | 2 | 5 | 0 |
| (Finland) | Ronja Savolainen | 3 | 2 | 3 | 5 | 2 |
| (Finland) | Noora Tulus | 3 | 3 | 1 | 4 | 0 |
| (Czech Republic) | Adéla Šapovalivová | 3 | 1 | 3 | 4 | 0 |
| (Finland) | Sanni Vanhanen | 3 | 1 | 3 | 4 | 2 |
| (Czech Republic) | Tereza Plosová | 3 | 2 | 1 | 3 | 0 |

Source: Finnish Ice Hockey Association

Goaltenders

| | Player | GP | TOI | SA | GA | SO | S-% | GAA |
|---|---|---|---|---|---|---|---|---|
| (Czech Republic) | Viktorie Švejdová | 2 | 80:00 | 12 | 0 | 1 | 100 | 0.00 |
| (Finland) | Tiia Pajarinen | 1 | 60:00 | 7 | 0 | 1 | 100 | 0.00 |
| (Czech Republic) | Klára Peslarová | 2 | 100:00 | 38 | 2 | 0 | 94.7 | 1.20 |
| (Denmark) | Caroline Thomsen | 2 | 118:36 | 80 | 6 | 0 | 92.5 | 3.04 |
| (Finland) | Anni Keisala | 2 | 118:55 | 32 | 4 | 0 | 87.5 | 2.02 |
| (Denmark) | Caroline Bjergstad | 1 | 60:00 | 52 | 8 | 0 | 84.6 | 8.00 |
| (Germany) | Sandra Abstreiter | 2 | 120:00 | 47 | 8 | 1 | 83.0 | 4.00 |
| (Germany) | Chiara Schultes | 1 | 60:00 | 29 | 8 | 0 | 72.4 | 8.00 |

Source: Finnish Ice Hockey Association

=== Player awards ===
Players of the Game

- Czechia v Finland: Kateřina Mrázová (CZE), Julia Liikala (FIN)
- Germany v Denmark: Nicola Eisenschmid (GER), Caroline Thomsen (DEN)
- Finland v Denmark: Petra Nieminen (FIN), Mille Sørensen (DEN)
- Czechia v Denmark: Noemi Neubauerová (CZE), Klara Holm (DEN)
- Germany v Finland: Laura Kluge (GER), Viivi Vainikka (FIN)
- Germany v Czechia: Theresa Wagner (GER), Sára Čajanová (CZE)

== Five Nations Tournament in Falun ==
The penultimate tournament of the season was a five nations tournament from 13 to 17 December 2023 at the ice rink (Swedish: ishall) of Lugnet Sports Complex in Falun, Sweden. The national teams of Czechia, Finland, Germany, Sweden, and Switzerland participated.

=== Standings ===
| Pos | Team | Pld | W | OTW | OTL | L | GF | GA | GD | Pts |
|---|---|---|---|---|---|---|---|---|---|---|
| 1 | Sweden (H) | 4 | 3 | 0 | 1 | 0 | 12 | 10 | +2 | 10 |
| 2 | Czechia | 4 | 2 | 1 | 0 | 1 | 14 | 6 | +8 | 8 |
| 3 | Switzerland | 4 | 2 | 0 | 0 | 2 | 11 | 10 | +1 | 6 |
| 4 | Finland | 4 | 2 | 0 | 0 | 2 | 12 | 12 | 0 | 6 |
| 5 | Germany | 4 | 0 | 0 | 0 | 4 | 4 | 15 | −11 | 0 |

Source: Finnish Ice Hockey Association
(H) Host

=== Results ===
All times local, Central European Time (UTC+01:00)

| 13 December 2023; 15:30 | Switzerland | 1–4 (0–1, 1–1, 1–2) | Czechia | Lugnets Ishall, Falun; Attendance: 50 |

Andrea Brändli
Goalies
Klára Peslarová
Referees:
Agnese Karklina
Ida Henriksson
Linesmen:
Jessica Lundgrem
Elva Hjálmarsdóttir

| | 0–1 | 02:45 – Čajanová (Tejralová, Gruntová) |
| Schaefer (Ingold) – 25:13 | 1–1 |
| | 1–2 | 34:17 – Vanišová (Pátková) |
| | 1–3 | 55:01 – Čajanová (Trnková, Přibylová) |
| | 1–4 | 57:55 – Mrázová (Pištěková) |

4 min
Penalties
4 min
21
Shots
33

| 13 December 2023; 19:00 | Sweden | 3–2 (1–0, 2–2, 0–0) | Germany | Lugnets Ishall, Falun; Attendance: 112 |

Tindra Holm
Goalies
Lisa Hemmerle
Referees:
Anniina Nurmi
Maria Furberg
Linesmen:
Tiina Saarimäki
Anina Schüpbache Egli

| Thuvik – 13:08 | 1–0 |
| Blom (Lundin, Tedenby) (PP) – 21:20 | 2–0 |
| | 2–1 | 30:03 – Lu. Welke (Strobel, Botthof) |
| T. Johansson (SH) – 38:55 | 3–1 |
| | 3–2 | 39:17 – Botthof (Wagner) (PP) |

12 min
Penalties
14 min
46
Shots
17

| 14 December 2023; 15:30 | Germany | 1–4 (0–3, 1–0, 0–1) | Finland | Lugnets Ishall, Falun; Attendance: 43 |

Chiara Schultes
Lisa Hemmerle
Goalies
Anni Keisala
Referees:
Sabina Küller
Agnese Karklina
Linesmen:
Anina Schüpbache Egli
Elva Hjálmarsdóttir

| | 0–1 | 04:52 – Täks (Schalin, Yrjänen) |
| | 0–2 | 12:32 – Yrjänen (Täks, Schalin) |
| | 0–3 | 18:45 – Savolainen (Schalin, Karvinen) |
| Klein (Miller) – 38:19 | 1–3 |
| | 1–4 | 45:09 – Tulus (Holopainen) |

6 min
Penalties
2 min
16
Shots
46

| 14 December 2023; 19:00 | Switzerland | 2–3 (0–0, 1–2, 1–1) | Sweden | Lugnets Ishall, Falun; Attendance: 76 |

Alexandra Lehmann
Goalies
Emma Söderberg
Referees:
Annina Nurmi
Maria Furberg
Linesmen:
Jessica Lundgren
Tiina Saarimäki

| | 0–1 | 25:58 – Tedenby (T. Johansson, Kjellbin) |
| Lutz (Ryhner, Baechler) – 34:28 | 1–1 |
| | 1–2 | 39:39 – Bouveng (T. Johansson, Karlsson) |
| | 1–3 | 41:21 – Sundin (Tedenby) |
| Büchi (Stalder, Müller) – 50:01 | 2–3 |

8 min
Penalties
10 min
20
Shots
30

| 15 December 2023; 15:30 | Germany | 0–2 (0–0, 0–2, 0–0) | Switzerland | Lugnets Ishall, Falun; Attendance: 79 |

| Lisa Hemmerle | Goalies | Andrea Brändli | Referees: Maria Furberg; Anniina Nurmi; Linesmen: Jessica Lundgren; Elva Hjálmarsdóttir |
| 0–1 / 28:05 – Leemann (Zimmermann); 0–2 / 31:16 – Marti (Enzler) | | | Referees: Maria Furberg; Anniina Nurmi; Linesmen: Jessica Lundgren; Elva Hjálmarsdóttir |
| 4 min | Penalties | 6 min | Referees: Maria Furberg; Anniina Nurmi; Linesmen: Jessica Lundgren; Elva Hjálmarsdóttir |
| 29 | Shots | 29 | Referees: Maria Furberg; Anniina Nurmi; Linesmen: Jessica Lundgren; Elva Hjálmarsdóttir |

| 15 December 2023; 19:00 | Czechia | 1–2 (1–2, 0–0, 0–0) | Finland | Lugnets Ishall, Falun; Attendance: 128 |

Viktorie Švejdová
Goalies
Sanni Ahola
Referees:
Ida Henriksson
Sabina Küller
Linesmen:
Ottilia Classon
Julia Johansson

| Seroiszková (Hymlarová) – 04:37 | 1–0 |
| | 1–1 | 05:29 – Tulus (Holopainen, Yrjölä) |
| | 1–2 | 17:39 – Vanhanen (Vesa) |

10 min
Penalties
0 min
26
Shots
28

| 16 December 2023; 13:30 | Czechia | 6–1 (3–0, 0–0, 3–1) | Germany | Lugnets Ishall, Falun; Attendance: 46 |

Michaela Hesová
Goalies
Lisa Hemmerle
Referees:
Sabina Küller
Agnese Karklina
Linesmen:
Ottilia Classon
Anina Schüpbache Egli

| Hymlarová (Vanišová) – 10:14 | 1–0 |
| Hymlarová (Vanišová, Tejralová) – 13:48 | 2–0 |
| Křížová (Vanišová) – 17:03 | 3–0 |
| Mrázová (Tejralová) – 40:27 | 4–0 |
| | 4–1 | 46:28 – Lu. Welcke (Li. Welcke) |
| Mlýnková (Mrázová) – 46:44 | 5–1 |
| Radová (Pátková, Neubauerová) – 53:17 | 6–1 |

12 min
Penalties
8 min
28
Shots
21

| 16 December 2023; 17:00 | Sweden | 4–3 (0–1, 3–1, 1–1) | Finland | Lugnets Ishall, Falun; Attendance: 368 |

Tindra Holm
Goalies
Sanni Ahola
Referees:
Anniina Nurmi
Ida Henriksson
Linesmen:
Julia Johansson
Tiina Saarimäki

| | 0–1 | 19:59 – Savander (Tulus, Schalin) |
| | 0–2 | 22:18 – Laitinen (Rantala, Holopainen) (PP) |
| Ljungblom (Kjellbin) – 29:12 | 1–2 |
| Lundin (Bouveng, T. Johansson) (PP) – 32:09 | 2–2 |
| Forsgren (Hjalmarsson) – 37:36 | 3–2 |
| Jungåker (Nylén Persson, Hjalmarsson) (PP) – 47:05 | 4–2 |
| | 4–3 | 51:25 – Tulus (Vainikka, Karvinen) |

6 min
Penalties
4 min
29
Shots
26

| 17 December 2023; 12:00 | Finland | 3–6 (2–2, 1–1, 0–3) | Switzerland | Lugnets Ishall, Falun; Attendance: 76 |

Anni Keisala
Goalies
Andrea Brändli
Referees:
Agnese Karklina
Ida Henriksson
Linesmen:
Ottilia Classon
Elva Hjálmarsdóttir

| | 0–1 | 10:48 – Stalder (Vallario, Enzler) |
| Täks (Yrjänen, Eronen) – 14:20 | 1–1 |
| | 1–2 | 16:09 – Stalder (Müller, Enzler) |
| Tulus (Yrjänen, Schalin) – 19:02 | 2–2 |
| | 2–3 | 23:49 – Enzler (Stalder, Müller) (PP) |
| Holopainen (Tulus) – 27:14 | 3–3 |
| | 3–4 | 40:56 – Stalder (Enzler, Müller) |
| | 3–5 | 57:46 – Zimmermann (Leemann) (EN) |
| | 3–6 | 58:22 – Stalder (Baechler) (EN) |

2 min
Penalties
2 min
33
Shots
36

| 17 December 2023; 15:30 | Sweden | 2–3 OT (0–0, 2–1, 0–1) (OT: 0–1) | Czechia | Lugnets Ishall, Falun; Attendance: 253 |

Emma Söderberg
Goalies
Klára Peslarová
Referees:
Markus Yngvesson
Sabina Küller
Linesmen:
Julia Johansson
Simon Lindberg

| Ljungblom – 25:15 | 1–0 |
| | 1–1 | 30:54 – Vanišová (Tejralová) (PP) |
| Ljungblom (Nylén Persson) – 38:52 | 2–1 |
| | 2–2 | 44:23 – Mlýnková (Tejralová) |
| | 2–3 | 62:47 – Mlýnková |

8 min
Penalties
6 min
25
Shots
29

Top scorers

| | Player | GP | G | A | Pts | PIM |
|---|---|---|---|---|---|---|
| (Switzerland) | Lara Stalder | 4 | 4 | 2 | 6 | 2 |
| (Finland) | Noora Tulus | 4 | 4 | 2 | 6 | 2 |
| (Czech Republic) | Tereza Vanišová | 4 | 2 | 3 | 5 | 4 |
| (Switzerland) | Rahel Enzler | 4 | 1 | 4 | 5 | 0 |
| (Finland) | Julia Schalin | 4 | 0 | 5 | 5 | 0 |
| (Czech Republic) | Aneta Tejralová | 4 | 0 | 5 | 5 | 0 |
| (Finland) | Elisa Holopainen | 4 | 1 | 3 | 4 | 0 |
| (Sweden) | Thea Johansson | 4 | 1 | 3 | 4 | 2 |
| (Switzerland) | Alina Müller | 4 | 0 | 4 | 4 | 2 |
| (Sweden) | Lina Ljungblom | 4 | 3 | 0 | 3 | 4 |
| (Czech Republic) | Natálie Mlýnková | 4 | 3 | 0 | 3 | 4 |

Source: Finnish Ice Hockey Association

Goaltenders

Note: Name^ indicates goaltender with less than thirty percent of their team's total minutes.

| | Player | GP | TOI | SA | GA | SO | S-% | GAA |
|---|---|---|---|---|---|---|---|---|
| (Czech Republic) | Michaela Hesová^ | 1 | 60:00 | 21 | 1 | 0 | 95.2 | 1.00 |
| (Czech Republic) | Klára Peslarová | 2 | 122:47 | 46 | 3 | 0 | 93.5 | 1.47 |
| (Czech Republic) | Viktorie Švejdová^ | 1 | 58:20 | 28 | 2 | 0 | 92.9 | 2.06 |
| (Switzerland) | Andrea Brändli | 3 | 180:00 | 95 | 7 | 1 | 92.6 | 2.33 |
| (Finland) | Sanni Ahola | 2 | 120:00 | 55 | 5 | 0 | 90.9 | 2.50 |
| (Germany) | Lisa Hemmerle | 4 | 215:56 | 124 | 12 | 0 | 90.3 | 3.33 |
| (Switzerland) | Alexandra Lehmann^ | 1 | 58:00 | 30 | 3 | 0 | 90.0 | 3.10 |
| (Sweden) | Emma Söderberg | 2 | 122:47 | 49 | 5 | 0 | 89.8 | 2.44 |
| (Sweden) | Tindra Holm | 2 | 120:00 | 43 | 5 | 0 | 88.4 | 2.50 |
| (Finland) | Anni Keisala | 2 | 118:40 | 40 | 5 | 0 | 87.5 | 2.53 |
| (Germany) | Chiara Schultes^ | 1 | 22:56 | 23 | 3 | 0 | 87.0 | 7.85 |

Source: Finnish Ice Hockey Association

=== Player awards ===
Players of the Game

- Sweden v Czechia: Klára Peslarová

== EHT Finals in Liberec ==
The season concluded with the 2023–24 Euro Hockey Tour Finals, held from 7 to 11 February 2024 at Home Credit Arena in Liberec, Czechia. The national teams of Czechia, Finland, Germany, Sweden, and Switzerland participated.

=== Standings ===
| Pos | Team | Pld | W | OTW | OTL | L | GF | GA | GD | Pts |
|---|---|---|---|---|---|---|---|---|---|---|
| 1 | Finland | 4 | 3 | 0 | 1 | 0 | 14 | 4 | +10 | 10 |
| 2 | Czechia (H) | 4 | 2 | 1 | 0 | 1 | 17 | 12 | +5 | 8 |
| 3 | Switzerland | 4 | 2 | 0 | 1 | 1 | 10 | 10 | 0 | 7 |
| 4 | Sweden | 4 | 1 | 1 | 0 | 2 | 11 | 10 | +1 | 5 |
| 5 | Germany | 4 | 0 | 0 | 0 | 4 | 1 | 17 | −16 | 0 |

Source: Czech Ice Hockey Association
(H) Host

=== Schedule ===
All times local, Central European Time (UTC+01:00)

| 7 February 2024; 15:30 | Sweden | 2–1 GWS (0–1, 0–0, 1–0) (OT: 0–0) (SO: 2–1) | Finland | Home Credit Arena, Liberec; Attendance: 323 |

| Emma Söderberg | Goalies | Tiia Pajarinen |
/ 0–1 / 02:46 – Nieminen (Savolainen); Hedqvist – 49:19 / 1–1
| Jungåker (miss); Ljungblom (miss); Svensson; Hedqvist (miss); Forsgren | Shootout | (miss) Nieminen; (miss) Savolainen; (miss) Karvinen; (miss) Hiirikoski; Tulus |
| 8 min | Penalties | 4 min |
| 27 | Shots | 42 |

| 7 February 2024; 19:00 | Switzerland | 2–0 (0–0, 2–0, 0–0) | Germany | Home Credit Arena, Liberec; Attendance: 311 |

| Talina Benderer | Goalies | Sandra Abstreiter |
Rossel (Baechler, Lutz) – 21:36 / 1–0; Leemann (Christen, Stalder) – 26:45 / 2–0
| 8 min | Penalties | 2 min |
| 22 | Shots | 22 |

| 8 February 2024; 15:30 | Finland | 3–1 (1–1, 1–0, 1–0) | Switzerland | Home Credit Arena, Liberec; Attendance: 395 |

Anni Keisala
Goalies
Saskia Maurer

| | 0–1 | 11:54 – Wey (Stalder) |
| Tapani (Karvinen) – 15:25 | 1–1 |
| Tapani (Karvinen, Nieminen) – 20:59 | 2–1 |
| Nieminen (Savolainen, Rantala) – 40:30 | 3–1 |

4 min
Penalties
6 min
34
Shots
12

| 8 February 2024; 19:00 | Germany | 1–7 (0–2, 1–3, 0–2) | Czechia | Home Credit Arena, Liberec; Attendance: 1,767 |

Lisa Hemmerle
Goalies
Blanka Škodová

| | 0–1 | 09:19 – Vanišová (Tejralová, Škodová) (PP) |
| | 0–2 | 10:35 – Plosová (Pejzlová, Šapovalivová) |
| | 0–3 | 20:25 – Pejzlová (Vanišová) |
| | 0–4 | 31:21 – Šapovalivová (Pejšová, Seroiszková) |
| Amort (Karpf, Wagner) – 33:32 | 1–4 |
| | 1–5 | 36:37 – Šapovalivová (Mrázová) |
| | 1–6 | 44:20 – Pejšová (PP) |
| | 1–7 | 56:58 – Gruntová (Křížová, Juříčková) |

6 min
Penalties
8 min
11
Shots
39

| 9 February 2024; 15:30 | Sweden | 3–4 (1–0, 2–2, 0–2) | Switzerland | Home Credit Arena, Liberec; Attendance: 565 |

Tindra Holm
Goalies
Talina Benderer

| Ljungblom (Ludin, Svensson) (PP) – 09:03 | 1–0 |
| Ljungblom (Jungåker, Svensson) – 31:27 | 2–0 |
| T. Johansson (Hedqvist) – 32:16 | 3–0 |
| | 3–1 | 33:27 – Schaefer (SH) |
| | 3–2 | 37:20 – Ingold (PP) |
| | 3–3 | 48:54 – Quennec (Schaefer, Christen) (PP) |
| | 3–4 | 49:57 – Herzig (Stalder, Wey) |

8 min
Penalties
12 min
31
Shots
13

| 9 February 2024; 19:00 | Czechia | 1–6 (0–2, 0–2, 1–2) | Finland | Home Credit Arena, Liberec; Attendance: 3,313 |

Klára Peslarová
Blanka Škodová
Goalies
Anni Keisala

| | 0–1 | 04:17 – Tulus (Savolainen, Tapani) (PP) |
| | 0–2 | 16:24 – Vanhanen |
| | 0–3 | 23:27 – Vesa (Antti-Roiko) |
| | 0–4 | 26:47 – Karvinen (Savolainen) (SH) |
| | 0–5 | 40:54 – Vainikka (Holopainen, Tulus) |
| Vanišová (Křížová, Seroiszková) – 48:01 | 1–5 |
| | 1–6 | 54:23 – Nieminen (EN) |

6 min
Penalties
6 min
30
Shots
21

| 10 February 2024; 14:30 | Germany | 0–4 (0–1, 0–2, 0–1) | Sweden | Home Credit Arena, Liberec; Attendance: 687 |

Sandra Abstreiter
Goalies
Ida Boman

| 0–1 | 12:18 – Nylén-Persson (Svensson, Hjalmarsson) (PP2) |
| 0–2 | 28:02 – Ljungblom (Svensson, Jungåker) (PP2) |
| 0–3 | 29:19 – Hallin (Kjellbin, Forsgren) |
| 0–4 | 53:09 – Nylén-Persson (Svensson, Hjalmarsson) (PP) |

14 min
Penalties
8 min
23
Shots
45

| 10 February 2024; 18:00 | Switzerland | 3–4 OT (0–1, 2–2, 1–0) (OT: 0–1) | Czechia | Home Credit Arena, Liberec; Attendance: 2,741 |

Saskia Maurer
Goalies
Viktorie Švejdová

| | 0–1 | 15:07 – Mrázová (Neubauerová, Šapovalivová) |
| | 0–2 | 28:08 – Mrázová (Vanišová) (PP) |
| Hauser (Schaefer, Quennec) – 29:06 | 1–2 |
| Stalder (Leemann, Wey) – 30:37 | 2–2 |
| | 2–3 | 30:56 – Pejzlová (Tejralová, Vanišová) |
| Marti (Schaefer) – 43:13 | 3–3 |
| | 3–4 | 64:09 – Tejralová (Vanišová) |

14 min
Penalties
14 min
18
Shots
39

| 11 February 2024; 12:00 | Finland | 4–0 (2–0, 1–0, 1–0) | Germany | Home Credit Arena, Liberec; Attendance: 663 |

Tiia Pajarinen
Goalies
Lisa Hemmerle

| Hiirikoski (Nieminen) (PP) – 09:33 | 1–0 |
| Hiirikoski (Nieminen, Tulus) – 15:28 | 2–0 |
| Tulus (Karvinen, Eronen) – 32:06 | 3–0 |
| Liikala (Savander, Vainikka) – 55:18 | 4–0 |

4 min
Penalties
6 min
49
Shots
16

| 11 February 2024; 15:30 | Czechia | 5–2 (2–1, 1–0, 2–1) | Sweden | Home Credit Arena, Liberec; Attendance: 3,155 |

Blanka Škodová
Goalies
Emma Söderberg

| | 0–1 | 06:39 – Forsgren (Blom, Sundin) |
| Šapovalivová (Mrázová) – 09:03 | 1–1 |
| Pejzlová (Křížová, Vanišová) – 10:43 | 2–1 |
| Křížová (Vanišová) – 30:49 | 3–1 |
| Mrázová (Šapovalivová, Neubauerová) (PP) – 44:42 | 4–1 |
| | 4–2 | 45:09 – Lundin |
| Mrázová (Pejšová) (PP) – 50:09 | 5–2 |

11 min
Penalties
6 min
31
Shots
23

=== Player awards ===
- Best Forward: (Finland) Michelle Karvinen

Players of the Game

- Czechia v Finland: Denisa Křížová, Michelle Karvinen
