= 2025 IIHF Women's World Championship rosters =

Each team's roster consists of at least 15 skaters (forwards, and defencemen) and two goaltenders, and at most 20 skaters and three goaltenders. All ten participating nations, through the confirmation of their respective national associations, had to submit a roster by the first IIHF directorate.

Age and team as of start of the tournament, 9 April 2025.

== Group A ==
=== Canada ===
The roster was announced on 21 March 2025.

Head coach: Troy Ryan

No.	Pos.	Name	Height	Weight	Birthdate	Team
2	D	Sophie Jaques	1.72 m (5 ft 8 in)	78 kg (172 lb)	16 October 2000 (aged 24)	(United States) Minnesota Frost
3	D	Jocelyne Larocque	1.68 m (5 ft 6 in)	65 kg (143 lb)	19 May 1988 (aged 36)	(Canada) Ottawa Charge
7	F	Laura Stacey	1.78 m (5 ft 10 in)	70 kg (150 lb)	5 May 1994 (aged 30)	(Canada) Montreal Victoire
8	D	Chloe Primerano	1.70 m (5 ft 7 in)	68 kg (150 lb)	2 January 2007 (aged 18)	(United States) University of Minnesota
10	F	Sarah Fillier	1.67 m (5 ft 6 in)	66 kg (146 lb)	9 June 2000 (aged 24)	(United States) New York Sirens
14	D	Renata Fast – A	1.70 m (5 ft 7 in)	65 kg (143 lb)	6 October 1994 (aged 30)	(Canada) Toronto Sceptres
17	D	Ella Shelton	1.78 m (5 ft 10 in)	78 kg (172 lb)	19 January 1998 (aged 27)	(United States) New York Sirens
19	F	Brianne Jenner – A	1.77 m (5 ft 10 in)	73 kg (161 lb)	4 May 1991 (aged 33)	(Canada) Ottawa Charge
20	F	Sarah Nurse	1.72 m (5 ft 8 in)	79 kg (174 lb)	5 January 1995 (aged 30)	(Canada) Toronto Sceptres
23	D	Erin Ambrose	1.61 m (5 ft 3 in)	60 kg (130 lb)	30 April 1994 (aged 30)	(Canada) Montreal Victoire
24	F	Natalie Spooner	1.78 m (5 ft 10 in)	80 kg (180 lb)	17 October 1990 (aged 34)	(Canada) Toronto Sceptres
26	F	Emily Clark	1.72 m (5 ft 8 in)	68 kg (150 lb)	28 November 1995 (aged 29)	(Canada) Ottawa Charge
27	F	Emma Maltais	1.60 m (5 ft 3 in)	60 kg (130 lb)	4 November 1999 (aged 25)	(Canada) Toronto Sceptres
28	D	Micah Zandee-Hart	1.75 m (5 ft 9 in)	73 kg (161 lb)	13 January 1997 (aged 28)	(United States) New York Sirens
29	F	Marie-Philip Poulin – C	1.73 m (5 ft 8 in)	73 kg (161 lb)	28 March 1991 (aged 34)	(Canada) Montreal Victoire
33	G	Ève Gascon	1.70 m (5 ft 7 in)	81 kg (179 lb)	9 May 2003 (aged 21)	(United States) Minnesota Duluth Bulldogs
35	G	Ann-Renée Desbiens	1.75 m (5 ft 9 in)	77 kg (170 lb)	10 April 1994 (aged 30)	(Canada) Montreal Victoire
40	F	Blayre Turnbull	1.69 m (5 ft 7 in)	70 kg (150 lb)	15 July 1993 (aged 31)	(Canada) Toronto Sceptres
42	D	Claire Thompson	1.74 m (5 ft 9 in)	68 kg (150 lb)	28 January 1998 (aged 27)	(United States) Minnesota Frost
43	F	Kristin O'Neill	1.68 m (5 ft 6 in)	58 kg (128 lb)	30 March 1998 (aged 27)	(Canada) Montreal Victoire
50	G	Kristen Campbell	1.78 m (5 ft 10 in)	82 kg (181 lb)	30 November 1997 (aged 27)	(Canada) Toronto Sceptres
88	F	Julia Gosling	1.80 m (5 ft 11 in)	81 kg (179 lb)	21 February 2001 (aged 24)	(Canada) Toronto Sceptres
92	F	Danielle Serdachny	1.75 m (5 ft 9 in)	71 kg (157 lb)	12 May 2001 (aged 23)	(Canada) Ottawa Charge
94	F	Jennifer Gardiner	1.67 m (5 ft 6 in)	69 kg (152 lb)	18 September 2001 (aged 23)	(Canada) Montreal Victoire
95	F	Daryl Watts	1.67 m (5 ft 6 in)	65 kg (143 lb)	15 May 1999 (aged 25)	(Canada) Toronto Sceptres

=== Czechia ===
The roster was announced on 31 March 2025.

Head coach: (Canada) Carla MacLeod

No.	Pos.	Name	Height	Weight	Birthdate	Team
1	G	Michaela Hesová	1.69 m (5 ft 7 in)	60 kg (130 lb)	2 November 2005 (aged 19)	(United States) Dartmouth Big Green
2	D	Aneta Tejralová – C	1.64 m (5 ft 5 in)	53 kg (117 lb)	4 January 1996 (aged 29)	(Canada) Ottawa Charge
3	F	Adéla Šapovalivová	1.61 m (5 ft 3 in)	58 kg (128 lb)	17 May 2006 (aged 18)	(Sweden) MoDo Hockey
4	D	Daniela Pejšová	1.75 m (5 ft 9 in)	70 kg (150 lb)	14 August 2002 (aged 22)	(United States) Boston Fleet
7	D	Klára Seroiszková	1.75 m (5 ft 9 in)	73 kg (161 lb)	25 January 2001 (aged 24)	(Sweden) HV71
8	F	Tereza Pištěková	1.71 m (5 ft 7 in)	60 kg (130 lb)	3 June 2005 (aged 19)	(Sweden) Djurgårdens IF
10	F	Denisa Křížová – A	1.65 m (5 ft 5 in)	64 kg (141 lb)	3 November 1994 (aged 30)	(United States) Minnesota Frost
11	F	Hana Haasová	1.65 m (5 ft 5 in)	72 kg (159 lb)	7 August 2003 (aged 21)	(Sweden) Djurgårdens IF
12	F	Klára Hymlárová	1.63 m (5 ft 4 in)	67 kg (148 lb)	27 February 1999 (aged 26)	(United States) Minnesota Frost
14	D	Dominika Lásková	1.67 m (5 ft 6 in)	70 kg (150 lb)	20 December 1996 (aged 28)	(Canada) Montreal Victoire
15	D	Andrea Trnková	1.73 m (5 ft 8 in)	72 kg (159 lb)	3 March 2004 (aged 21)	(United States) RPI Engineers
16	F	Kateřina Mrázová – A	1.63 m (5 ft 4 in)	61 kg (134 lb)	19 October 1992 (aged 32)	(Canada) Ottawa Charge
18	F	Michaela Pejzlová	1.69 m (5 ft 7 in)	62 kg (137 lb)	4 June 1997 (aged 27)	(Switzerland) HC Ambrì-Piotta
19	F	Natálie Mlýnková	1.61 m (5 ft 3 in)	61 kg (134 lb)	24 May 2001 (aged 23)	(United States) Minnesota Golden Gophers
20	F	Barbora Juříčková	1.68 m (5 ft 6 in)	60 kg (130 lb)	21 October 2006 (aged 18)	(Finland) HPK Hämeenlinna
21	F	Tereza Vanišová	1.69 m (5 ft 7 in)	64 kg (141 lb)	30 January 1996 (aged 29)	(Canada) Ottawa Charge
22	F	Tereza Plosová	1.77 m (5 ft 10 in)	64 kg (141 lb)	5 July 2006 (aged 18)	(Sweden) Djurgårdens IF
24	D	Sára Čajanová	1.70 m (5 ft 7 in)	63 kg (139 lb)	10 December 2002 (aged 22)	(Sweden) Brynäs IF
26	F	Vendula Přibylová	1.71 m (5 ft 7 in)	78 kg (172 lb)	23 March 1996 (aged 29)	(Sweden) MoDo Hockey
27	D	Tereza Radová	1.76 m (5 ft 9 in)	74 kg (163 lb)	22 November 2001 (aged 23)	(Sweden) Leksands IF
28	F	Noemi Neubauerová	1.73 m (5 ft 8 in)	69 kg (152 lb)	15 December 1999 (aged 25)	(Canada) Toronto Sceptres
29	G	Klára Peslarová	1.64 m (5 ft 5 in)	63 kg (139 lb)	23 November 1996 (aged 28)	(United States) Boston Fleet
30	G	Viktorie Švejdová	1.68 m (5 ft 6 in)	68 kg (150 lb)	24 June 2002 (aged 22)	(Sweden) HV71
81	D	Karolína Kosinová	1.72 m (5 ft 8 in)	75 kg (165 lb)	21 May 1998 (aged 26)	(Czech Republic) HC Baník Příbram
98	F	Kristýna Kaltounková	1.74 m (5 ft 9 in)	75 kg (165 lb)	14 April 2002 (aged 22)	(United States) Colgate Raiders

=== Finland ===
The roster was announced on 26 March 2025.

Head coach: Juuso Toivola

No.	Pos.	Name	Height	Weight	Birthdate	Team
1	G	Sanni Ahola	1.71 m (5 ft 7 in)	81 kg (179 lb)	3 June 2000 (aged 24)	(United States) St. Cloud State Huskies
5	D	Siiri Yrjölä	1.66 m (5 ft 5 in)	68 kg (150 lb)	8 September 2004 (aged 20)	(United States) St. Cloud State Huskies
7	D	Sanni Rantala	1.73 m (5 ft 8 in)	63 kg (139 lb)	8 July 2002 (aged 22)	(Sweden) Frölunda HC
8	D	Elli Suoranta	1.68 m (5 ft 6 in)	75 kg (165 lb)	17 June 2002 (aged 22)	(Finland) Ilves Tampere
9	D	Nelli Laitinen	1.69 m (5 ft 7 in)	62 kg (137 lb)	29 April 2002 (aged 22)	(United States) Minnesota Golden Gophers
10	F	Elisa Holopainen	1.66 m (5 ft 5 in)	63 kg (139 lb)	27 December 2001 (aged 23)	(Sweden) Frölunda HC
11	D	Oona Koukkula	1.65 m (5 ft 5 in)	61 kg (134 lb)	22 August 2003 (aged 21)	(Sweden) Brynäs IF
12	F	Sanni Vanhanen	1.68 m (5 ft 6 in)	62 kg (137 lb)	1 July 2005 (aged 19)	(Sweden) Brynäs IF
14	D	Krista Parkkonen	1.68 m (5 ft 6 in)	64 kg (141 lb)	25 June 2002 (aged 22)	(United States) Minnesota Golden Gophers
16	F	Petra Nieminen	1.69 m (5 ft 7 in)	70 kg (150 lb)	4 May 1999 (aged 25)	(Sweden) Luleå HF
18	F	Jenniina Nylund	1.71 m (5 ft 7 in)	63 kg (139 lb)	18 June 1999 (aged 25)	(Sweden) Brynäs IF
19	F	Ida Kuoppala	1.68 m (5 ft 6 in)	78 kg (172 lb)	17 February 2000 (aged 25)	(Sweden) Skellefteå AIK
22	F	Julia Schalin	1.60 m (5 ft 3 in)	63 kg (139 lb)	31 August 2005 (aged 19)	(United States) Mercyhurst Lakers
24	F	Viivi Vainikka	1.66 m (5 ft 5 in)	63 kg (139 lb)	23 December 2001 (aged 23)	(Sweden) Luleå HF
27	F	Emma Ekoluoma	1.65 m (5 ft 5 in)	71 kg (157 lb)	20 January 2006 (aged 19)	(Finland) Ilves Tampere
28	D	Ada Eronen	1.70 m (5 ft 7 in)	70 kg (150 lb)	13 April 2004 (aged 20)	(Finland) Kiekko-Espoo
30	G	Emilia Kyrkkö	1.69 m (5 ft 7 in)	70 kg (150 lb)	24 February 2004 (aged 21)	(United States) St. Cloud State Huskies
32	F	Emilia Vesa	1.77 m (5 ft 10 in)	66 kg (146 lb)	3 January 2001 (aged 24)	(Sweden) Frölunda HC
33	F	Michelle Karvinen – C	1.67 m (5 ft 6 in)	65 kg (143 lb)	27 March 1990 (aged 35)	(Sweden) Frölunda HC
34	F	Sofianna Sundelin	1.69 m (5 ft 7 in)	58 kg (128 lb)	13 January 2003 (aged 22)	(United States) St. Cloud State Huskies
36	G	Anni Keisala	1.75 m (5 ft 9 in)	80 kg (180 lb)	5 April 1997 (aged 28)	(Finland) HPK Hämeenlinna
40	F	Noora Tulus – A	1.65 m (5 ft 5 in)	62 kg (137 lb)	15 August 1995 (aged 29)	(United States) New York Sirens
77	F	Susanna Tapani	1.77 m (5 ft 10 in)	68 kg (150 lb)	2 March 1993 (aged 32)	(United States) Boston Fleet
88	D	Ronja Savolainen – A	1.77 m (5 ft 10 in)	76 kg (168 lb)	29 November 1997 (aged 27)	(Canada) Ottawa Charge
91	F	Julia Liikala	1.66 m (5 ft 5 in)	64 kg (141 lb)	20 March 2001 (aged 24)	(Switzerland) HC Ambrì-Piotta

=== Switzerland ===
The roster was announced on 14 March 2025. Forward Mara Frey was added to the roster on 31 March 2025.

Head coach: Colin Muller

No.	Pos.	Name	Height	Weight	Birthdate	Team
6	F	Mara Frey	1.69 m (5 ft 7 in)	66 kg (146 lb)	26 September 2002 (aged 22)	(Switzerland) ZSC Lions
7	F	Lara Stalder – C	1.67 m (5 ft 6 in)	63 kg (139 lb)	15 May 1994 (aged 30)	(Switzerland) EV Zug
8	F	Kaleigh Quennec – A	1.72 m (5 ft 8 in)	79 kg (174 lb)	15 February 1998 (aged 27)	(Switzerland) SC Bern
9	D	Shannon Sigrist	1.67 m (5 ft 6 in)	68 kg (150 lb)	20 April 1999 (aged 25)	(Switzerland) ZSC Lions
11	F	Laura Zimmermann	1.63 m (5 ft 4 in)	73 kg (161 lb)	5 April 2003 (aged 22)	(United States) St. Cloud State Huskies
12	F	Lisa Rüedi	1.67 m (5 ft 6 in)	67 kg (148 lb)	3 November 2000 (aged 24)	(Switzerland) ZSC Lions
13	F	Ivana Wey	1.72 m (5 ft 8 in)	63 kg (139 lb)	4 February 2006 (aged 19)	(Switzerland) EV Zug
15	D	Laure Mériguet	1.73 m (5 ft 8 in)	65 kg (143 lb)	15 August 2008 (aged 16)	(Switzerland) Genève-Servette HC U17
16	D	Nicole Vallario	1.66 m (5 ft 5 in)	71 kg (157 lb)	30 August 2001 (aged 23)	(United States) St. Thomas Tommies
17	D	Lara Christen	1.63 m (5 ft 4 in)	64 kg (141 lb)	2 October 2002 (aged 22)	(Switzerland) SC Bern
18	D	Stefanie Wetli	1.73 m (5 ft 8 in)	71 kg (157 lb)	4 February 2000 (aged 25)	(Switzerland) HC Davos
20	G	Andrea Brändli	1.69 m (5 ft 7 in)	75 kg (165 lb)	5 June 1997 (aged 27)	(Sweden) MoDo Hockey
21	F	Rahel Enzler	1.63 m (5 ft 4 in)	66 kg (146 lb)	30 July 2000 (aged 24)	(Switzerland) EV Zug
22	F	Sinja Leemann	1.68 m (5 ft 6 in)	62 kg (137 lb)	19 April 2002 (aged 22)	(Switzerland) ZSC Lions
24	F	Noemi Ryhner	1.65 m (5 ft 5 in)	62 kg (137 lb)	24 April 2000 (aged 24)	(Switzerland) EV Zug
25	F	Alina Müller – A	1.67 m (5 ft 6 in)	63 kg (139 lb)	12 March 1998 (aged 27)	(United States) Boston Fleet
26	F	Naemi Herzig	1.70 m (5 ft 7 in)	68 kg (150 lb)	21 March 2007 (aged 18)	(Switzerland) EV Zug
28	F	Alina Marti	1.67 m (5 ft 6 in)	67 kg (148 lb)	23 April 2004 (aged 20)	(Switzerland) ZSC Lions
29	G	Saskia Maurer	1.66 m (5 ft 5 in)	60 kg (130 lb)	29 July 2001 (aged 23)	(Switzerland) SC Bern
53	F	Vanessa Schaefer	1.63 m (5 ft 4 in)	63 kg (139 lb)	21 March 2005 (aged 20)	(Canada) UBC Thunderbirds
62	D	Elena Gaberell	1.69 m (5 ft 7 in)	67 kg (148 lb)	2 May 2005 (aged 19)	(Switzerland) EV Zug
68	F	Leoni Balzer	1.65 m (5 ft 5 in)	60 kg (130 lb)	18 January 2006 (aged 19)	(Switzerland) HC Davos
70	G	Monja Wagner	1.64 m (5 ft 5 in)	63 kg (139 lb)	10 April 2003 (aged 21)	(United States) Union Garnet Chargers
82	D	Alessia Baechler	1.74 m (5 ft 9 in)	68 kg (150 lb)	7 September 2005 (aged 19)	(Switzerland) ZSC Lions
94	D	Alena Rossel	1.71 m (5 ft 7 in)	58 kg (128 lb)	8 June 2006 (aged 18)	(Switzerland) SC Bern

=== United States ===
The roster was announced on 5 March 2025.

Head coach: John Wroblewski

No.	Pos.	Name	Height	Weight	Birthdate	Team
2	D	Lee Stecklein	1.82 m (6 ft 0 in)	80 kg (180 lb)	23 April 1994 (aged 30)	(United States) Minnesota Frost
3	D	Cayla Barnes	1.57 m (5 ft 2 in)	65 kg (143 lb)	7 January 1999 (aged 26)	(Canada) Montreal Victoire
4	D	Caroline Harvey	1.73 m (5 ft 8 in)	66 kg (146 lb)	14 October 2002 (aged 22)	(United States) University of Wisconsin
5	D	Megan Keller – A	1.80 m (5 ft 11 in)	75 kg (165 lb)	1 May 1996 (aged 28)	(United States) Boston Fleet
7	F	Lacey Eden	1.72 m (5 ft 8 in)	70 kg (150 lb)	2 May 2002 (aged 22)	(United States) University of Wisconsin
8	D	Haley Winn	1.68 m (5 ft 6 in)	68 kg (150 lb)	14 July 2003 (aged 21)	(United States) Clarkson University
9	F	Kirsten Simms	1.67 m (5 ft 6 in)	66 kg (146 lb)	31 August 2004 (aged 20)	(United States) University of Wisconsin
10	D	Laila Edwards	1.85 m (6 ft 1 in)	85 kg (187 lb)	25 January 2004 (aged 21)	(United States) University of Wisconsin
12	F	Kelly Pannek	1.70 m (5 ft 7 in)	78 kg (172 lb)	29 December 1995 (aged 29)	(United States) Minnesota Frost
13	F	Grace Zumwinkle	1.75 m (5 ft 9 in)	74 kg (163 lb)	23 April 1999 (aged 25)	(United States) Minnesota Frost
15	D	Savannah Harmon	1.60 m (5 ft 3 in)	65 kg (143 lb)	27 October 1995 (aged 29)	(Canada) Toronto Sceptres
16	F	Hayley Scamurra	1.72 m (5 ft 8 in)	77 kg (170 lb)	14 December 1994 (aged 30)	(Canada) Toronto Sceptres
17	F	Britta Curl-Salemme	1.75 m (5 ft 9 in)	77 kg (170 lb)	20 March 2000 (aged 25)	(United States) Minnesota Frost
18	F	Jesse Compher	1.78 m (5 ft 10 in)	66 kg (146 lb)	1 July 1999 (aged 25)	(Canada) Toronto Sceptres
21	F	Hilary Knight – C	1.80 m (5 ft 11 in)	78 kg (172 lb)	12 July 1989 (aged 35)	(United States) Boston Fleet
22	F	Tessa Janecke	1.73 m (5 ft 8 in)	76 kg (168 lb)	12 May 2004 (aged 20)	(United States) Penn State University
24	F	Joy Dunne	1.80 m (5 ft 11 in)	81 kg (179 lb)	13 June 2005 (aged 19)	(United States) Ohio State University
25	F	Alex Carpenter – A	1.68 m (5 ft 6 in)	68 kg (150 lb)	13 April 1994 (aged 30)	(United States) New York Sirens
26	F	Kendall Coyne	1.58 m (5 ft 2 in)	57 kg (126 lb)	25 May 1992 (aged 32)	(United States) Minnesota Frost
27	F	Taylor Heise	1.74 m (5 ft 9 in)	74 kg (163 lb)	17 March 2000 (aged 25)	(United States) Minnesota Frost
30	G	Ava McNaughton	1.80 m (5 ft 11 in)	86 kg (190 lb)	27 October 2004 (aged 20)	(United States) University of Wisconsin
31	G	Aerin Frankel	1.68 m (5 ft 6 in)	65 kg (143 lb)	24 May 1999 (aged 25)	(United States) Boston Fleet
33	G	Gwyneth Philips	1.65 m (5 ft 5 in)	63 kg (139 lb)	17 September 2000 (aged 24)	(Canada) Ottawa Charge
37	F	Abbey Murphy	1.62 m (5 ft 4 in)	68 kg (150 lb)	14 April 2002 (aged 22)	(United States) University of Minnesota
38	D	Anna Wilgren	1.70 m (5 ft 7 in)	75 kg (165 lb)	18 November 1999 (aged 25)	(Canada) Montreal Victoire

== Group B ==
=== Germany ===
The roster was announced on 26 March 2025. Nina Christof sustained an upper-body injury in a pre-tournament match and was replaced by Lucia Schmitz on 4 April 2025. Anna Rose departed the team during pre-tournament training due to illness and was later replaced by Mathilda Heine.

Head coach: (Canada) Jeff MacLeod

No.	Pos.	Name	Height	Weight	Birthdate	Team
5	D	Charlott Schaffrath	1.84 m (6 ft 0 in)	72 kg (159 lb)	26 December 2005 (aged 19)	(Germany) ECDC Memmingen
7	F	Franziska Feldmeier	1.65 m (5 ft 5 in)	70 kg (150 lb)	5 February 1999 (aged 26)	(Germany) Eisbären Juniors Berlin
8	D	Ronja Hark – A	1.58 m (5 ft 2 in)	60 kg (130 lb)	17 August 2003 (aged 21)	(Germany) ECDC Memmingen
9	F	Svenja Voigt	1.65 m (5 ft 5 in)	60 kg (130 lb)	29 March 2004 (aged 21)	(United States) St. Cloud State Huskies
11	F	Nicola Hadraschek	1.67 m (5 ft 6 in)	68 kg (150 lb)	10 September 1996 (aged 28)	(Germany) ECDC Memmingen
13	F	Luisa Welcke	1.66 m (5 ft 5 in)	66 kg (146 lb)	29 April 2002 (aged 22)	(United States) Boston University Terriers
14	D	Carina Strobel	1.72 m (5 ft 8 in)	62 kg (137 lb)	11 September 1997 (aged 27)	(Germany) ECDC Memmingen
16	F	Jule Schiefer	1.73 m (5 ft 8 in)	68 kg (150 lb)	12 September 2001 (aged 23)	(Germany) ECDC Memmingen
17	F	Emily Nix	1.73 m (5 ft 8 in)	75 kg (165 lb)	12 January 1998 (aged 27)	(Sweden) SDE HF
20	D	Daria Gleißner – C	1.70 m (5 ft 7 in)	70 kg (150 lb)	30 June 1993 (aged 31)	(Germany) ECDC Memmingen
21	D	Tabea Botthof	1.75 m (5 ft 9 in)	77 kg (170 lb)	1 June 2000 (aged 24)	(Germany) Mad Dogs Mannheim
23	F	Lilli Welcke	1.66 m (5 ft 5 in)	66 kg (146 lb)	29 April 2002 (aged 22)	(United States) Boston University Terriers
24	F	Lucia Schmitz	1.65 m (5 ft 5 in)	65 kg (143 lb)	15 April 2000 (aged 24)	(Germany) Mad Dogs Mannheim
25	F	Laura Kluge – A	1.79 m (5 ft 10 in)	63 kg (139 lb)	6 November 1996 (aged 28)	(Canada) Toronto Sceptres
26	D	Tara Schmitz	1.66 m (5 ft 5 in)	62 kg (137 lb)	16 March 1998 (aged 27)	(Germany) Mad Dogs Mannheim
28	D	Nina Jobst-Smith	1.70 m (5 ft 7 in)	67 kg (148 lb)	30 August 2001 (aged 23)	(United States) Minnesota Duluth Bulldogs
34	F	Celina Haider	1.70 m (5 ft 7 in)	64 kg (141 lb)	20 July 2000 (aged 24)	(Germany) ERC Ingolstadt
35	G	Sandra Abstreiter	1.81 m (5 ft 11 in)	78 kg (172 lb)	23 July 1998 (aged 26)	(Canada) Montreal Victoire
40	F	Alexandra Boico	1.71 m (5 ft 7 in)	65 kg (143 lb)	12 June 2009 (aged 15)	(Germany) EC Bad Tölz
41	F	Mathilda Heine	1.69 m (5 ft 7 in)	65 kg (143 lb)	18 February 2009 (aged 16)	(Germany) ETC Crimmitschau
43	F	Charleen Poindl	1.69 m (5 ft 7 in)	75 kg (165 lb)	2 January 2009 (aged 16)	(Germany) Eisbären Juniors Berlin
46	D	Hanna Weichenhain	1.70 m (5 ft 7 in)	61 kg (134 lb)	18 October 2008 (aged 16)	(Germany) ECDC Memmingen
70	G	Lisa Hemmerle	1.67 m (5 ft 6 in)	63 kg (139 lb)	11 December 1995 (aged 29)	(Germany) ERC Ingolstadt
71	F	Anne Bartsch	1.64 m (5 ft 5 in)	63 kg (139 lb)	22 September 1995 (aged 29)	(Germany) ECDC Memmingen
75	G	Chiara Schultes	1.68 m (5 ft 6 in)	62 kg (137 lb)	22 July 2005 (aged 19)	(Germany) ECDC Memmingen

=== Hungary ===
The roster was announced on 7 April 2025.

Head coach: (Canada) Pat Cortina

No.	Pos.	Name	Height	Weight	Birthdate	Team
1	G	Anikó Németh	1.65 m (5 ft 5 in)	61 kg (134 lb)	6 September 1996 (aged 28)	(Hungary) Budapest JA
2	D	Bernadett Németh	1.65 m (5 ft 5 in)	56 kg (123 lb)	6 September 1996 (aged 28)	(Kazakhstan) Aisulu Almaty
4	D	Taylor Baker	1.65 m (5 ft 5 in)	66 kg (146 lb)	30 July 1997 (aged 27)	(Sweden) Brynäs IF
6	D	Lili Hajdu	1.75 m (5 ft 9 in)	69 kg (152 lb)	6 January 2009 (aged 16)	(Hungary) Budapest JA
7	F	Zsófia Pázmándi	1.65 m (5 ft 5 in)	65 kg (143 lb)	16 December 2002 (aged 22)	(United States) Lindenwood Lady Lions
8	D	Isabel Lippai	1.65 m (5 ft 5 in)	60 kg (130 lb)	25 June 2002 (aged 22)	(Hungary) MAC Budapest
9	F	Krisztina Weiler	1.64 m (5 ft 5 in)	65 kg (143 lb)	1 January 2008 (aged 17)	(Canada) Ontario Hockey Academy
10	F	Imola Horváth	1.68 m (5 ft 6 in)	76 kg (168 lb)	2 August 2002 (aged 22)	(Sweden) Södertälje SK
11	F	Fanni Gasparics – C	1.67 m (5 ft 6 in)	61 kg (134 lb)	20 November 1994 (aged 30)	(Sweden) Brynäs IF
12	F	Petra Polónyi	1.70 m (5 ft 7 in)	65 kg (143 lb)	25 September 2008 (aged 16)	(Canada) Ontario Hockey Academy
13	D	Lotti Odnoga – A	1.74 m (5 ft 9 in)	71 kg (157 lb)	19 January 1999 (aged 26)	(Sweden) SDE HF
14	D	Franciska Kiss-Simon	1.80 m (5 ft 11 in)	74 kg (163 lb)	7 November 1995 (aged 29)	(Hungary) HK Budapest
15	F	Réka Dabasi – A	1.68 m (5 ft 6 in)	59 kg (130 lb)	24 December 1996 (aged 28)	(Hungary) HK Budapest
17	F	Madeline Leidt	1.70 m (5 ft 7 in)	70 kg (150 lb)	7 October 1998 (aged 26)	(Hungary) HK Budapest
18	F	Alexandra Huszák	1.73 m (5 ft 8 in)	61 kg (134 lb)	18 June 1995 (aged 29)	(Hungary) MAC Budapest
23	F	Réka Hiezl	1.69 m (5 ft 7 in)	60 kg (130 lb)	10 June 2009 (aged 15)	(Hungary) Vasas SC U16
31	G	Zoé Takács	1.67 m (5 ft 6 in)	67 kg (148 lb)	25 August 2008 (aged 16)	(Hungary) MAC Budapest
33	G	Zsuzsa Révész	1.65 m (5 ft 5 in)	83 kg (183 lb)	17 August 2005 (aged 19)	(United States) North American Hockey Academy
41	F	Boglárka Báhiczki-Tóth	1.82 m (6 ft 0 in)	80 kg (180 lb)	11 October 2007 (aged 17)	(Canada) Purcell Hockey Academy
71	D	Fruzsina Mayer	1.68 m (5 ft 6 in)	73 kg (161 lb)	16 July 2000 (aged 24)	(Hungary) HK Budapest
72	F	Míra Seregély	1.76 m (5 ft 9 in)	66 kg (146 lb)	27 April 2003 (aged 21)	(United States) Maine Black Bears
77	F	Regina Metzler	1.78 m (5 ft 10 in)	80 kg (180 lb)	25 October 2005 (aged 19)	(United States) Mercyhurst Lakers
88	F	Emma Kreisz	1.75 m (5 ft 9 in)	73 kg (161 lb)	2 September 2003 (aged 21)	(United States) Minnesota Golden Gophers
91	D	Lorina Haraszt	1.64 m (5 ft 5 in)	62 kg (137 lb)	5 March 2008 (aged 17)	(Hungary) IOGJA
97	F	Kinga Jókai-Szilágyi	1.68 m (5 ft 6 in)	65 kg (143 lb)	19 August 1997 (aged 27)	(Austria) SKN Sabres St. Pölten

=== Japan ===
The roster was announced on 26 March 2025.

Head coach: Yuji Iizuka

No.	Pos.	Name	Height	Weight	Birthdate	Team
2	D	Shiori Koike – C	1.59 m (5 ft 3 in)	55 kg (121 lb)	21 March 1993 (aged 32)	(Japan) DK Peregrine
3	D	Aoi Shiga	1.65 m (5 ft 5 in)	60 kg (130 lb)	4 July 1999 (aged 25)	(Japan) Toyota Cygnus
4	D	Ayaka Hitosato – A	1.61 m (5 ft 3 in)	59 kg (130 lb)	22 August 1994 (aged 30)	(Sweden) Linköping HC
5	D	Shiori Yamashita	1.58 m (5 ft 2 in)	52 kg (115 lb)	28 April 2002 (aged 22)	(Japan) Seibu Princess Rabbits
6	D	Kohane Sato	1.63 m (5 ft 4 in)	62 kg (137 lb)	16 March 2006 (aged 19)	(Japan) Daishin
7	D	Kanami Seki	1.68 m (5 ft 6 in)	67 kg (148 lb)	23 June 2000 (aged 24)	(Japan) Seibu Princess Rabbits
8	D	Akane Hosoyamada – A	1.63 m (5 ft 4 in)	62 kg (137 lb)	9 March 1992 (aged 33)	(Japan) DK Peregrine
10	F	Hikaru Yamashita	1.57 m (5 ft 2 in)	53 kg (117 lb)	23 September 2000 (aged 24)	(Japan) Seibu Princess Rabbits
11	F	Akane Shiga	1.65 m (5 ft 5 in)	63 kg (139 lb)	3 March 2001 (aged 24)	(Sweden) Luleå HF
13	F	Yumeka Wajima	1.56 m (5 ft 1 in)	48 kg (106 lb)	19 October 2002 (aged 22)	(Japan) DK Peregrine
15	F	Rui Ukita	1.70 m (5 ft 7 in)	70 kg (150 lb)	6 June 1996 (aged 28)	(Japan) Daishin
16	F	Yoshino Enomoto	1.62 m (5 ft 4 in)	56 kg (123 lb)	22 September 1998 (aged 26)	(Japan) Seibu Princess Rabbits
17	F	Wakana Kurosu	1.61 m (5 ft 3 in)	63 kg (139 lb)	3 June 2000 (aged 24)	(Japan) DK Peregrine
18	F	Suzuka Maeda	1.61 m (5 ft 3 in)	54 kg (119 lb)	16 October 1996 (aged 28)	(Japan) DK Peregrine
19	F	Makoto Ito	1.69 m (5 ft 7 in)	70 kg (150 lb)	2 May 2004 (aged 20)	(Japan) Toyota Cygnus
20	G	Miyuu Masuhara	1.57 m (5 ft 2 in)	53 kg (117 lb)	4 October 2001 (aged 23)	(Japan) DK Peregrine
24	F	Mei Miura	1.62 m (5 ft 4 in)	67 kg (148 lb)	16 November 1998 (aged 26)	(Japan) Toyota Cygnus
27	F	Remi Koyama	1.47 m (4 ft 10 in)	53 kg (117 lb)	17 July 2000 (aged 24)	(Japan) Seibu Princess Rabbits
30	G	Haruka Kuromaru	1.67 m (5 ft 6 in)	52 kg (115 lb)	29 March 2007 (aged 18)	(Japan) CrystalBlades
31	G	Riko Kawaguchi	1.66 m (5 ft 5 in)	71 kg (157 lb)	19 September 2004 (aged 20)	(Japan) Daishin
40	F	Rio Noro	1.64 m (5 ft 5 in)	58 kg (128 lb)	15 May 2004 (aged 20)	(Japan) Daishin
41	F	Riri Noro	1.61 m (5 ft 3 in)	56 kg (123 lb)	15 May 2004 (aged 20)	(Japan) Daishin
91	F	Umeka Odaira	1.62 m (5 ft 4 in)	52 kg (115 lb)	12 December 2008 (aged 16)	(Japan) Daishin

=== Norway ===
The roster was announced on 17 March 2025.

Head coach: André Lysenstøen

No.	Pos.	Name	Height	Weight	Birthdate	Team
1	G	Ena Nystrøm	1.77 m (5 ft 10 in)	72 kg (159 lb)	28 April 2000 (aged 24)	(Sweden) Brynäs IF
2	D	Iben Tillman	1.60 m (5 ft 3 in)	63 kg (139 lb)	7 May 2005 (aged 19)	(Finland) HPK Hämeenlinna
3	D	Silje Kongstorp	1.73 m (5 ft 8 in)	67 kg (148 lb)	25 August 2002 (aged 22)	(Norway) Lillehammer IK
4	D	Thea Rustbakken	1.71 m (5 ft 7 in)	67 kg (148 lb)	14 July 2006 (aged 18)	(Norway) Lillehammer IK
5	D	Ava Malthe	1.72 m (5 ft 8 in)	63 kg (139 lb)	31 January 2004 (aged 21)	(Canada) Mount Royal Cougars
6	F	Kajsa Bråten	1.63 m (5 ft 4 in)	64 kg (141 lb)	26 May 2007 (aged 17)	(Sweden) Färjestad BK
7	F	Karoline Pedersen	1.72 m (5 ft 8 in)	70 kg (150 lb)	13 March 1999 (aged 26)	(Denmark) Rødovre SIK
8	F	Lotte Pedersen	1.65 m (5 ft 5 in)	64 kg (141 lb)	28 February 2003 (aged 22)	(Norway) Stavanger Oilers
9	F	Tea Nyberg	1.62 m (5 ft 4 in)	65 kg (143 lb)	11 November 2003 (aged 21)	(Sweden) HV71
10	F	Millie Rose Sirum	1.75 m (5 ft 9 in)		2 November 2000 (aged 24)	(United States) Providence Friars
11	F	Tiril Arntzen	1.66 m (5 ft 5 in)	69 kg (152 lb)	6 February 2007 (aged 18)	(Norway) Vålerenga Oslo
12	D	Oda Austefjord	1.60 m (5 ft 3 in)	57 kg (126 lb)	22 May 2007 (aged 17)	(Norway) Stavanger Oilers
13	F	Ida Haave	1.67 m (5 ft 6 in)	69 kg (152 lb)	2 July 2006 (aged 18)	(Norway) Lillehammer IK
14	F	Tilde Simensen	1.66 m (5 ft 5 in)	60 kg (130 lb)	5 January 2007 (aged 18)	(Norway) Stavanger Oilers
15	F	Emilie Kruse	1.67 m (5 ft 6 in)	65 kg (143 lb)	13 October 1999 (aged 25)	(Sweden) Leksands IF
16	D	Andrine Furulund	1.78 m (5 ft 10 in)	71 kg (157 lb)	29 June 1998 (aged 26)	(Sweden) Färjestad BK
17	F	Marthe Brunvold	1.69 m (5 ft 7 in)	59 kg (130 lb)	25 June 2001 (aged 23)	(Sweden) Linköping HC
18	F	Josefine Engmann	1.74 m (5 ft 9 in)	68 kg (150 lb)	9 August 1998 (aged 26)	(Norway) Lillehammer IK
19	D	Thea Jørgensen	1.76 m (5 ft 9 in)	80 kg (180 lb)	25 June 2001 (aged 23)	(United States) Lindenwood Lady Lions
20	G	Marthe Kongstorp	1.76 m (5 ft 9 in)	78 kg (172 lb)	15 March 2005 (aged 20)	(Norway) Lillehammer IK
21	F	Silje Gundersen	1.73 m (5 ft 8 in)	80 kg (180 lb)	8 February 2004 (aged 21)	(United States) Lindenwood Lady Lions
22	F	Andrea Dalen – A	1.73 m (5 ft 8 in)	67 kg (148 lb)	19 June 1992 (aged 32)	(Sweden) Frölunda HC
23	D	Emma Bergesen – A	1.65 m (5 ft 5 in)	62 kg (137 lb)	1 November 1999 (aged 25)	(Sweden) SDE HF
24	F	Mathea Fischer – C	1.70 m (5 ft 7 in)	73 kg (161 lb)	8 October 1997 (aged 27)	(Sweden) SDE HF
25	G	Kaja Ekle	1.69 m (5 ft 7 in)	58 kg (128 lb)	6 June 2002 (aged 22)	(Sweden) IF Björklöven

=== Sweden ===
The roster was announced on 25 March 2025.

Head coach: Ulf Lundberg

No.	Pos.	Name	Height	Weight	Birthdate	Team
1	G	Ebba Svensson Träff	1.66 m (5 ft 5 in)	67 kg (148 lb)	27 November 2005 (aged 19)	(Sweden) Linköping HC
4	D	Linnéa Andersson	1.71 m (5 ft 7 in)	64 kg (141 lb)	30 September 1998 (aged 26)	(Sweden) MoDo Hockey
7	D	Mira Jungåker	1.70 m (5 ft 7 in)	68 kg (150 lb)	22 July 2005 (aged 19)	(United States) Ohio State Buckeyes
8	F	Hilda Svensson	1.68 m (5 ft 6 in)	67 kg (148 lb)	24 August 2006 (aged 18)	(Sweden) HV71
9	D	Emma Forsgren	1.71 m (5 ft 7 in)	65 kg (143 lb)	15 August 2002 (aged 22)	(Sweden) Djurgårdens IF
11	F	Josefin Bouveng	1.75 m (5 ft 9 in)	69 kg (152 lb)	15 May 2001 (aged 23)	(United States) Minnesota Golden Gophers
13	F	Wilma Sundin	1.65 m (5 ft 5 in)	60 kg (130 lb)	24 September 2003 (aged 21)	(Sweden) MoDo Hockey
14	D	Ida Karlsson	1.78 m (5 ft 10 in)	72 kg (159 lb)	30 June 2004 (aged 20)	(United States) Minnesota Duluth Bulldogs
15	F	Lisa Johansson	1.61 m (5 ft 3 in)	58 kg (128 lb)	11 April 1992 (aged 32)	(Sweden) SDE Hockey
17	F	Sofie Lundin	1.65 m (5 ft 5 in)	64 kg (141 lb)	15 February 2000 (aged 25)	(Sweden) Frölunda HC
19	F	Sara Hjalmarsson – A	1.76 m (5 ft 9 in)	76 kg (168 lb)	8 February 1998 (aged 27)	(Sweden) Linköping HC
21	F	Lova Blom	1.68 m (5 ft 6 in)	75 kg (165 lb)	15 July 2003 (aged 21)	(Sweden) Linköping HC
22	F	Hanna Thuvik	1.70 m (5 ft 7 in)	75 kg (165 lb)	17 May 2002 (aged 22)	(Sweden) Brynäs IF
23	F	Thea Johansson	1.71 m (5 ft 7 in)	67 kg (148 lb)	22 November 2002 (aged 22)	(United States) Mercyhurst Lakers
24	F	Ebba Hedqvist	1.68 m (5 ft 6 in)	67 kg (148 lb)	30 September 2006 (aged 18)	(Sweden) MoDo Hockey
25	F	Lina Ljungblom – A	1.67 m (5 ft 6 in)	77 kg (170 lb)	15 October 2001 (aged 23)	(Canada) Montreal Victoire
26	F	Hanna Olsson	1.73 m (5 ft 8 in)	67 kg (148 lb)	20 January 1999 (aged 26)	(Sweden) Frölunda HC
30	G	Emma Söderberg	1.71 m (5 ft 7 in)	67 kg (148 lb)	18 February 1998 (aged 27)	(United States) Boston Fleet
31	G	Ida Boman	1.66 m (5 ft 5 in)	58 kg (128 lb)	1 April 2003 (aged 22)	(Sweden) Djurgårdens IF
34	F	Mira Hallin	1.67 m (5 ft 6 in)	63 kg (139 lb)	24 April 2006 (aged 18)	(Sweden) MoDo Hockey
45	D	Paula Bergström	1.72 m (5 ft 8 in)	73 kg (161 lb)	26 January 1999 (aged 26)	(Sweden) Frölunda HC
55	D	Jenna Raunio	1.74 m (5 ft 9 in)	70 kg (150 lb)	25 September 2006 (aged 18)	(Sweden) HV71
71	D	Anna Kjellbin – C	1.69 m (5 ft 7 in)	63 kg (139 lb)	16 March 1994 (aged 31)	(Canada) Toronto Sceptres
77	F	Linnéa Johansson	1.71 m (5 ft 7 in)	69 kg (152 lb)	5 April 2002 (aged 23)	(Sweden) Luleå HF
82	D	Annie Silén	1.72 m (5 ft 8 in)	73 kg (161 lb)	28 March 2002 (aged 23)	(Sweden) Brynäs IF
