= 2023 Deutschland Cup =

Tournament details
- Host country: Germany
- Venue: 1 (in 1 host city)
- Dates: 8–12 November
- Teams: 8

The 2023 Deutschland Cup was the 34th edition of the tournament, held between 8 and 12 November 2023. For the first time, a women's tournament was held as well.

Germany won the men's tournament and Czechia the women's edition.

== Men's tournament ==
2023 Deutschland Cup
Tournament details
- Venue: 1 (in 1 host city)
- Dates: 9–12 November
- Teams: 4

Final positions
- Champions: Germany (10th title)
- Runners-up: Slovakia
- Third place: Denmark
- Fourth place: Austria

Tournament statistics
- Games played: 6
- Goals scored: 38 (6.33 per game)
- Attendance: 14,051 (2,342 per game)
- Scoring leader(s): (Denmark) Oscar Fisker Mølgaard (Slovakia) Peter Čerešňák (5 points)

=== Standings ===
Pos	Team	Pld	W	OTW	OTL	L	GF	GA	GD	Pts
1	Germany	3	2	0	0	1	10	6	+4	6 (Note: Germany 3 Pts, +2 GD, Slovakia 3 Pts, 0 GD, Denmark 3 Pts, −2 GD)
2	Slovakia	3	2	0	0	1	12	6	+6	6
3	Denmark	3	2	0	0	1	11	8	+3	6
4	Austria	3	0	0	0	3	5	18	−13	0

Source: IIHF
Rules for classification: 1) points; 2) head-to-head points; 3) head-to-head goal difference; 4) head-to-head number of goals scored.

=== Results ===
All times are local (UTC+1).

9 November 2023; 12:30	Austria	1–7 (0–4, 1–2, 0–1)	Slovakia	Eisstadion am Gutenbergweg, Landshut; Attendance: 328

Game reference

David Madlener
Stefan Müller
Goalies
Samuel Hlavaj
Referees:
(Germany) Christopher Schadewaldt
(Germany) Gordon Schukies
Linesmen:
(Germany) Denis Menz
(Germany) Tobias Schwenk

	0–1	07:56 – Takáč (Faško-Rudáš, Cingel) (PP)
	0–2	12:37 – Baláž (Beňo)
	0–3	14:29 – Okuliar (Roman)
	0–4	14:49 – Baláž (Minarik)
Feldner (Zwerger, Unterweger) – 24:07	1–4
	1–5	33:30 – Cingel (Čerešňák, Paulovič) (PP)
	1–6	33:47 – Okuliar
	1–7	41:25 – Faško-Rudáš

6 min
Penalties
6 min
11
Shots
22

9 November 2023; 19:45	Germany	4–1 (0–0, 1–1, 3–0)	Denmark	Eisstadion am Gutenbergweg, Landshut; Attendance: 2,223

Game reference

Arno Tiefensee
Goalies
Mathias Seldrup
Referees:
(Germany) Marc Iwert
(Germany) Seedo Janssen
Linesmen:
(Germany) Yannik Koziol
(Germany) Marius Wölzmüller

Pföderl (Samanski, Ugbekile) – 25:58	1–0
	1–1	39:13 – Russell (Meyer)
Ugbekile (Eder, Kammerer) (PP) – 52:47	2–1
Ehl (Varejcka, Appendino) – 58:06	3–1
Eisenmenger (EN) – 59:33	4–1

10 min
Penalties
6 min
30
Shots
17

11 November 2023; 11:00	Slovakia	3–4 (0–2, 1–1, 2–1)	Denmark	Eisstadion am Gutenbergweg, Landshut; Attendance: 1,500

Game reference

Matej Tomek
Goalies
Mathias Seldrup
Referees:
(Germany) Marc Iwert
(Germany) Christopher Schadewaldt
Linesmen:
(Germany) Kai Jürgens
(Germany) Denis Menz

	0–1	08:08 – Blichfeld (Mølgaard, Schultz)
	0–2	16:55 – Wejse (Scheel, Bruggisser)
	0–3	24:08 – Aagaard (Mølgaard, Blichfeld) (PP)
Cingel (Čerešňák, Faško-Rudáš) (PP2) – 32:29	1–3
	1–4	53:50 – Koch (Aagaard, From)
Okuliar (Hrehorčák, Čerešňák) – 54:05	2–4
Roman (Baláž, Čerešňák) (EA) – 57:47	3–4

10 min
Penalties
18 min
27
Shots
25

11 November 2023; 18:00	Germany	5–3 (0–1, 1–1, 4–1)	Austria	Eisstadion am Gutenbergweg, Landshut; Attendance: 4,200

Game reference

Leon Hungerecker
Goalies
Florian Vorauer
Referees:
(Germany) Lasse Kopitz
(Germany) Gordon Schukies
Linesmen:
(Germany) Tobias Schwenk
(Germany) Marius Wölzmüller

	0–1	09:44 – Baumgartner (Huber)
	0–2	27:51 – Baumgartner (Zwerger, Huber)
Michaelis (Ehliz) – 31:36	1–2
Michaelis (Schinko, Ehliz) – 43:27	2–2
Varejcka (Pfaffengut) – 44:10	3–2
Ehliz – 46:26	4–2
	4–3	52:47 – Baumgartner (Zwerger) (PP)
Pfaffengut (Michaelis) (EN) – 59:57	5–3

8 min
Penalties
4 min
26
Shots
27

12 November 2023; 11:00	Denmark	6–1 (2–0, 2–0, 2–1)	Austria	Eisstadion am Gutenbergweg, Landshut; Attendance: 1,600

Game reference

Kristers Steinbergs
Goalies
Florian Vorauer
Referees:
(Germany) Seedo Janssen
(Germany) Lasse Kopitz
Linesmen:
(Germany) Yannik Koziol
(Germany) Tobias Schwenk

Bruggisser (Mølgaard, Aagaard) (PP) – 02:26	1–0
Fredriksen (Kjær, Andersen) – 12:20	2–0
From (Aagaard) – 22:58	3–0
Russell (Bruggisser, Mølgaard) (PP) – 39:16	4–0
Larsen (Blichfeld, Mølgaard) – 41:29	5–0
Andersen (Fredriksen) – 49:54	6–0
	6–1	56:33 – Maier (Unterweger)

8 min
Penalties
10 min
24
Shots
18

12 November 2023; 14:30	Germany	1–2 (0–1, 0–0, 1–1)	Slovakia	Eisstadion am Gutenbergweg, Landshut; Attendance: 4,200

Game reference

Florian Bugl
Goalies
Samuel Hlavaj
Referees:
(Germany) Marc Iwert
(Germany) Gordon Schukies
Linesmen:
(Germany) Kai Jürgens
(Germany) Marius Wölzmüller

	0–1	01:06 – Kašlík (Baláž)
	0–2	42:23 – Cingel (Čerešňák, Okuliar) (PP)
Pföderl (Eder, Zimmermann) (PP) – 55:31	1–2

8 min
Penalties
12 min
25
Shots
26

== Women's tournament ==
2023 Deutschland Cup
Tournament details
- Venue: 1 (in 1 host city)
- Dates: 8–11 November
- Teams: 4

Final positions
- Champions: Czechia (1st title)
- Runners-up: Finland
- Third place: Germany
- Fourth place: Denmark

Tournament statistics
- Games played: 6
- Goals scored: 37 (6.17 per game)
- Attendance: 6,830 (1,138 per game)
- Scoring leader(s): (Czech Republic) Kateřina Mrázová (Finland) Petra Nieminen (6 points)

=== Standings ===
Pos	Team	Pld	W	OTW	OTL	L	GF	GA	GD	Pts
1	Czechia	3	3	0	0	0	17	2	+15	9
2	Finland	3	2	0	0	1	18	5	+13	6
3	Germany (H)	3	1	0	0	2	2	16	−14	3
4	Denmark	3	0	0	0	3	0	14	−14	0

Source: Finnish Ice Hockey Association
(H) Host

=== Results ===
All times are local (UTC+1).

8 November 2023; 16:15	Czechia	4–2 (3–0, 0–1, 1–1)	Finland	Eisstadion am Gutenbergweg, Landshut; Attendance: 300

Game reference

Klára Peslarová
Goalies
Anni Keisala
Referees:
(Germany) Vanessa Anselm
(Germany) Tijana Haack
Linesmen:
(Germany) Lara Fischer
(Germany) Julia Struber

Neubauerová (Šapovalivová) – 07:20	1–0
Křížová (Mrázová, Pejšová) – 12:05	2–0
Pejzlová (Vanišová) – 18:02	3–0
	3–1	32:18 – Yrjölä (Salonen, Savander)
	3–2	45:26 – Nylund (Liikala) (PP)
Šapovalivová (Lásková) (EN) – 59:57	4–2

14 min
Penalties
8 min
22
Shots
18

8 November 2023; 19:45	Germany	1–0 (0–0, 1–0, 0–0)	Denmark	Eisstadion am Gutenbergweg, Landshut; Attendance: 1,028

Game reference
Sandra Abstreiter	Goalies	Caroline Thomsen	Referees: (Germany) Julia Kainberger (Germany) Svenja Strohmenger; Linesmen: (Germany) Marine Diant (Germany) Leonie Ernst
Miller (Häckelsmiller, Schmitz) – 28:24 / 1–0			Referees: (Germany) Julia Kainberger (Germany) Svenja Strohmenger; Linesmen: (Germany) Marine Diant (Germany) Leonie Ernst
6 min	Penalties	6 min	Referees: (Germany) Julia Kainberger (Germany) Svenja Strohmenger; Linesmen: (Germany) Marine Diant (Germany) Leonie Ernst
29	Shots	13	Referees: (Germany) Julia Kainberger (Germany) Svenja Strohmenger; Linesmen: (Germany) Marine Diant (Germany) Leonie Ernst

9 November 2023; 16:15	Finland	8–0 (1–0, 2–0, 5–0)	Denmark	Eisstadion am Gutenbergweg, Landshut; Attendance: 520

Game reference

Tiia Pajarinen
Goalies
Caroline Bjergstad
Referees:
(Germany) Vanessa Anselm
(Germany) Svenja Strohmenger
Linesmen:
(Germany) Marine Diant
(Germany) Björn Edlund

Savolainen (Vanhanen, Liikala) – 06:52	1–0
Nieminen (Vanhanen, Liikala) – 24:11	2–0
Nieminen (Hiirikoski, Liikala) – 39:37	3–0
Savolainen (Nieminen) – 41:13	4–0
Nieminen (Vanhanen, Savolainen) – 43:03	5–0
Täks (Hiirikoski, Schalin) – 48:21	6–0
Täks (Rantala, Nylund) – 53:01	7–0
Tulus (Yrjölä, Nieminen) (PP) – 59:48	8–0

2 min
Penalties
12 min
52
Shots
7

10 November 2023; 15:00	Czechia	5–0 (2–0, 1–0, 2–0)	Denmark	Eisstadion am Gutenbergweg, Landshut; Attendance: 308

Game reference

Viktorie Švejdová
Goalies
Caroline Thomsen
Referees:
(Germany) Svenja Strohmenger
(Germany) Julia Kainberger
Linesmen:
(Germany) Leonie Ernst
(Germany) Lara Fischer

Vanišová (Křížová, Seroiszková) – 03:28	1–0
Plosová (Mrázová, Pištěková) – 04:42	2–0
Mrázová (Jůzková, Lásková) – 35:26	3–0
Neubauerová (Mrázová) – 43:32	4–0
Mrázová (Neubauerová) – 50:07	5–0

4 min
Penalties
10 min
51
Shots
10

10 November 2023; 19:00	Germany	1–8 (0–2, 0–4, 1–2)	Finland	Eisstadion am Gutenbergweg, Landshut; Attendance: 1,667

Game reference

Chiara Schultes
Goalies
Anni Keisala
Referees:
(Germany) Vanessa Anselm
(Germany) Tijana Haack
Linesmen:
(Germany) Marine Dinant
(Germany) Julia Strube

	0–1	10:00 – Vanhanen (Liikala, Rantala)
	0–2	13:56 – Tulus (Salonen, Savolainen)
	0–3	22:57 – Vainikka (Tulus) (SH)
	0–4	24:10 – Salonen (Savolainen, Yrjänen) (SH)
	0–5	28:12 – Liikala (SH)
	0–6	33:04 – Kaila (Salonen, Montonen)
	0–7	40:22 – Tulus (Nylund)
Wagner (Kluge) – 49:05	1–7
	1–8	49:25 – Yrjänen (Seikkula, Koukkula)

4 min
Penalties
14 min
11
Shots
30

11 November 2023; 14:30	Germany	0–8 (0–3, 0–1, 0–4)	Czechia	Eisstadion am Gutenbergweg, Landshut; Attendance: 3,007

Game reference

Sandra Abstreiter
Goalies
Klára Peslarová
Viktorie Švejdová
Referees:
(Germany) Tijana Haack
(Germany) Julia Kainberger
Linesmen:
(Germany) Leonie Ernst
(Germany) Lara Fischer

0–1	05:47 – Neubauerová (Šapovalivová) (PP)
0–2	08:24 – Čajanová (Křížová)
0–3	19:45 – Křížová (Lásková, Seroiszková)
0–4	39:13 – Přibylová (Tejralová, Plosová)
0–5	40:44 – Křížová
0–6	49:49 – Neubauerová
0–7	50:45 – Plosová (Pištěková)
0–8	56:33 – Mrázová (Pejšová, Šapovalivová) (PP)

16 min
Penalties
6 min
22
Shots
34
