= Mathilda Heine =

German ice hockey player (born 2009)

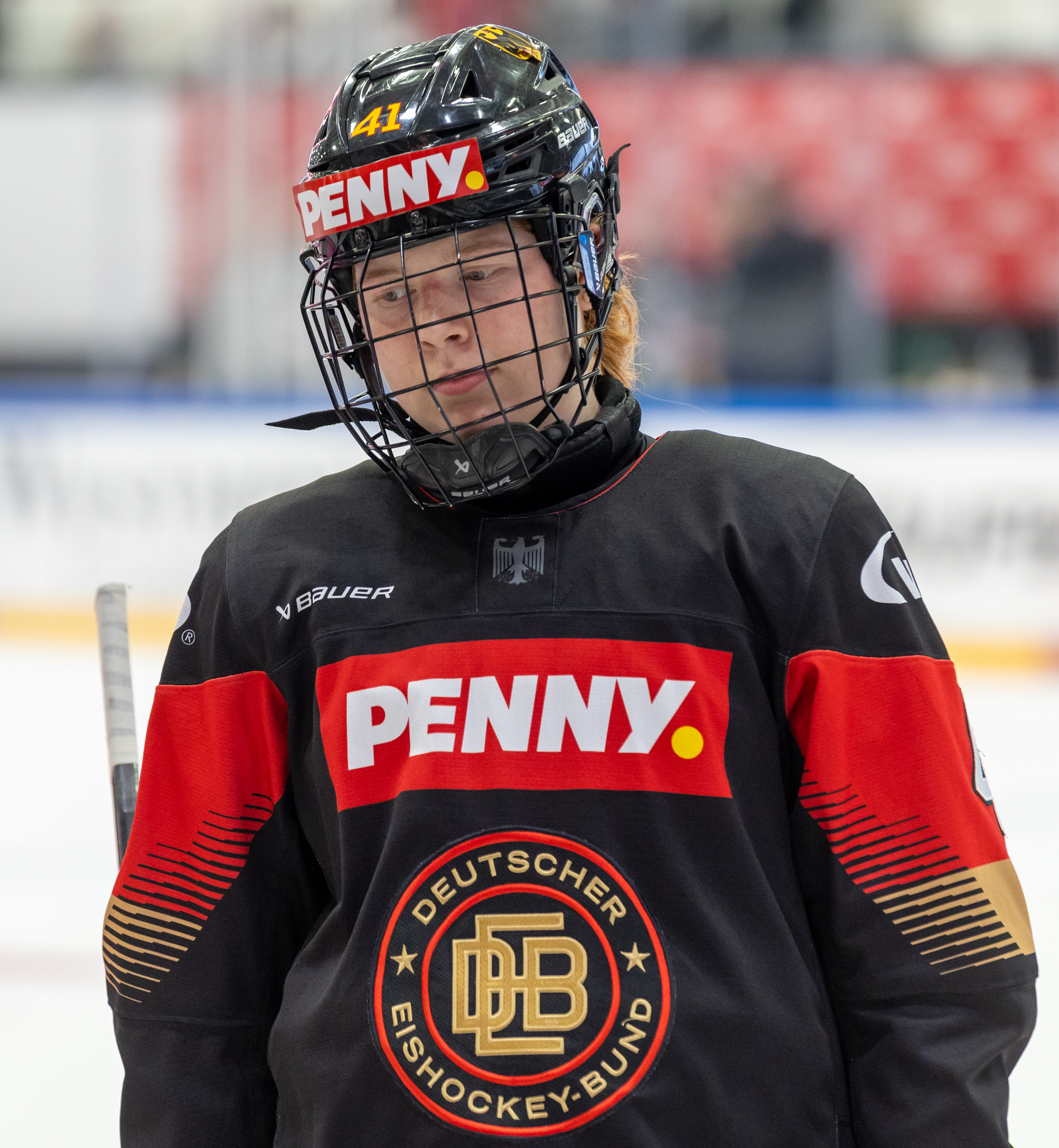
- Heine in 2026
- Born: 18 February 2009 (age 17) Werdau, Germany
- Height: 1.70 m (5 ft 7 in)
- Weight: 69 kg (152 lb; 10 st 12 lb)
- Position: Forward
- National team: Germany

Mathilda Heine (born 18 February 2009) is a German ice hockey player. She is a member of the Germany women's national ice hockey team that participated in women's ice hockey tournament at the 2026 Winter Olympics. She was one of 17 teenagers that played in women's ice hockey at the 2026 Winter Olympics.

== Playing career ==
=== International ===
With Germany making their first appearance in women's ice hockey at the Olympics since 2014, the 5 February 2026, match versus Sweden meant that every member of the German roster was making their Olympic debut. Heine, wearing number 41, logged 5:53 of ice time in a 4–1 loss to Sweden.
