= Vanessa Schaefer =

Swiss ice hockey player (born 2005)

- Born: March 21, 2005 (age 21) Vancouver, British Columbia, Canada
- Height: 1.63 m (5 ft 4 in)
- Weight: 63 kg (139 lb; 9 st 13 lb)
- Position: Right Wing
- Shoots: Left
- U Sports team Former teams: UBC Thunderbirds; ZSC Lions
- National team: Switzerland
- Playing career: 2023–present
Medal record
Olympic Games
Bronze medal – third place	2026 Milano Cortina	Team

Vanessa Schaefer (born March 21, 2005) is a Swiss Canadian ice hockey player for the UBC Thunderbirds women's ice hockey team of U Sports. Schaefer competes internationally for the Switzerland women's national ice hockey team.

== International play ==
Born in Canada, Schaefer was born to a Swiss father. Her first international appearance for the Switzerland women's national ice hockey team occurred during the 2024 IIHF Women's World Championship in Utica, New York.

In April 2025, Schaefer represented Switzerland again during the 2025 IIHF Women's World Championship in the Czech Republic.

On January 7, 2026, Schaefer was selected to represent Switzerland in the ice hockey tournament at 2026 Winter Olympics.
