= Fanatec Arena =

Indoor ice hockey rink in Landshut, Bavaria, Germany

Coordinates: 48°31′47″N 12°08′19″E

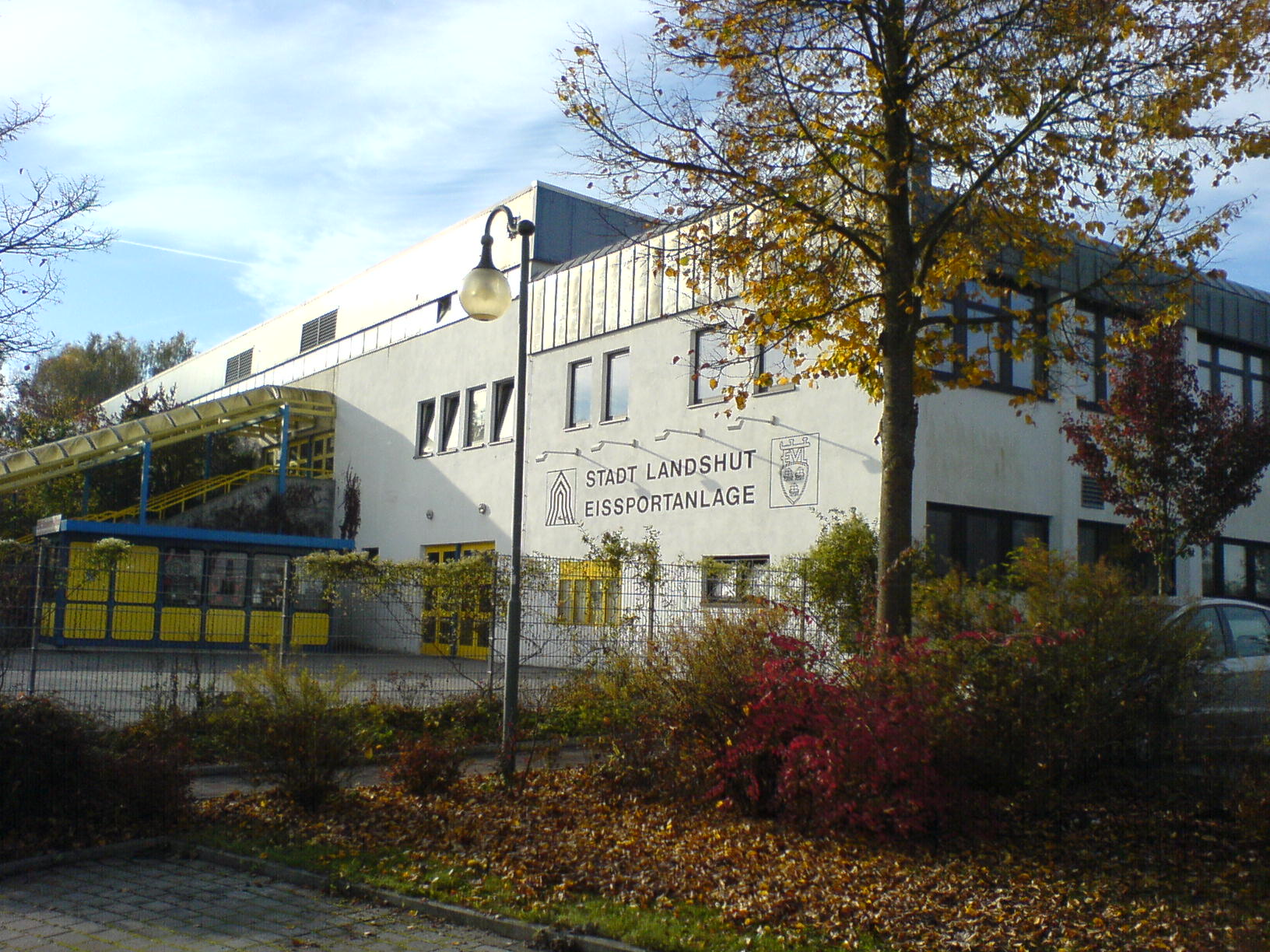
View of the stadium from SportsCenter West (before renovation)

The VR-Bank Landshut Arena (former: Fanatec Arena and Eisstadion am Gutenbergweg; English: Gutenberg-road ice hockey venue) is an indoor sporting arena located in Landshut, Germany. It is primarily used for ice hockey. The complex of buildings consists of two ice rinks, one generally used for training purposes. The second arena is the home venue of EV Landshut, a professional ice hockey club participating in Germany's DEL2. The major arena currently holds 4,448 people.

The (then) outdoor arena was inaugurated on 10 November 1957 on the current location of the stadium, ten years later the stadium was roofed. Until 1981 the venue was owned by the Eislaufverein Landshut (German for ice hockey association Landshut), but the increasing maintenance costs forced the association to sell the stadium to the City of Landshut. The city agreed on a treaty that gained the professional ice hockey team of the previous holder the right to use the stadium for their purposes, i.e. their compulsory games. Since then the owner of the stadium has not changed any more.

After more than two years of renovation, the arena, which now bears the name of the sponsor Fanatec,^{[no]} was reopened on October 31, 2021, with the regular season game EV Landshut vs. Lausitzer Füchse which ended 5-4 in Overtime. The rink now measures 60x28 m.

The facilities of the building include the "Landesleistungszentrum für Eishockey" (German for intensive training centre for ice hockey in Bavaria).

The stadium hosted the 2007 IIHF Inline Hockey World Championships and the 2022 IIHF World U18 Championships.
