= Lisa Hemmerle =

German ice hockey player (born 1995)

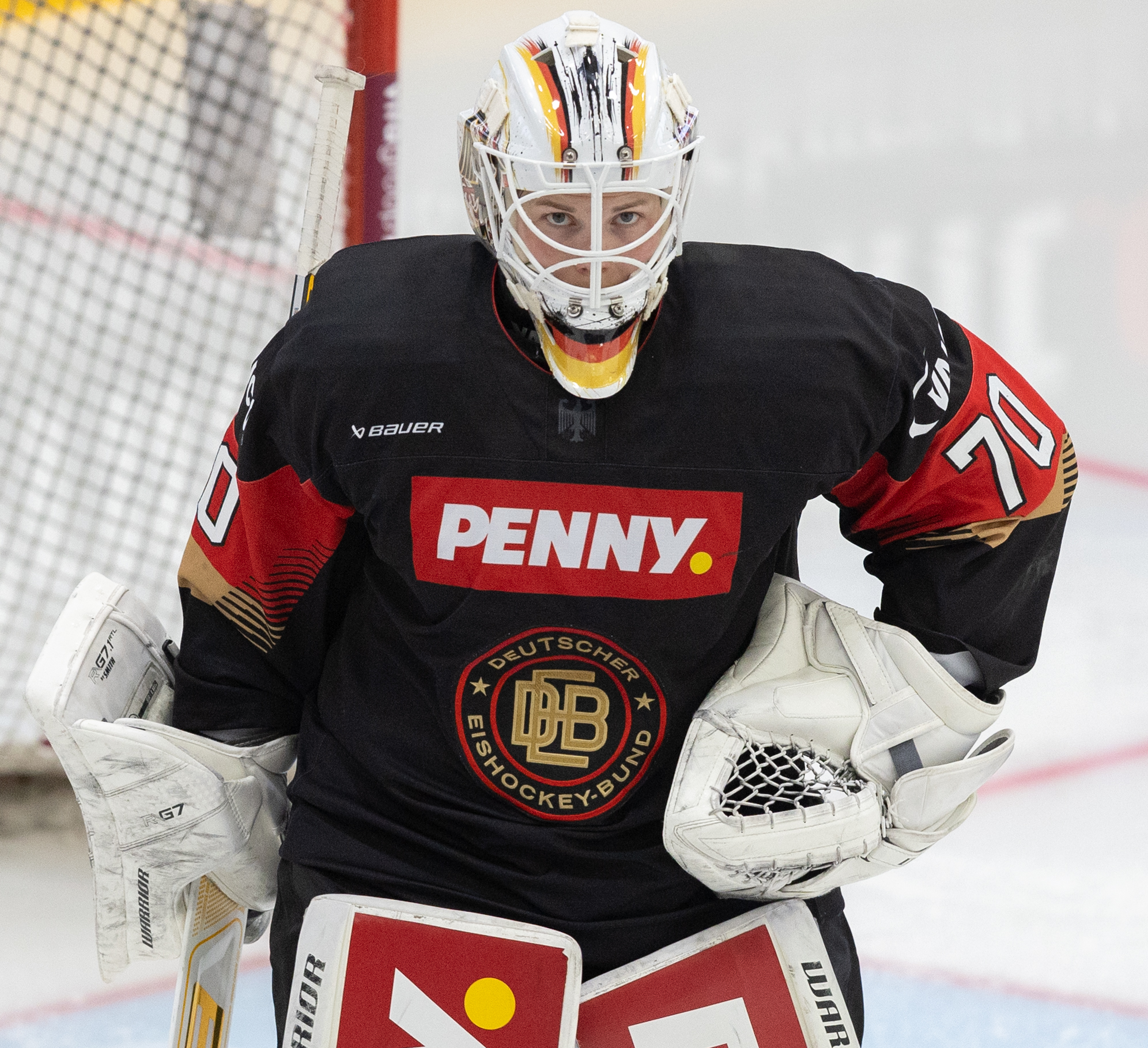
- Hemmerle in 2026
- Born: 11 December 1995 (age 30) Munich, Germany
- Height: 1.67 m (5 ft 6 in)
- Weight: 63 kg (139 lb; 9 st 13 lb)
- Position: Goaltender
- Catches: Left
- DFEL team: ERC Ingolstadt
- National team: Germany
- Playing career: 2011–present

Lisa Hemmerle (born 11 December 1995) is a German ice hockey goaltender. She is a member of the Germany women's national ice hockey team that participated in women's ice hockey tournament at the 2026 Winter Olympics.

== Playing career ==
With the club ERC Ingolstadt, Hemmerle helped lead the club to its first ever championship. In the DFEL Finals, the club defeated ECDC Memmingen three games to one. In the fourth and deciding game,

=== International ===
On 5 February 2026, Germany faced off Sweden in the first game of Group B play at the 2026 Winter Olympics. She dressed for the game but served as the backup to Sandra Abstreiter.

== Awards and honors ==
- 2022 DFEL Playoff MVP
