= Oona Koukkula =

Finnish ice hockey player (born 2003)

- Born: 22 August 2003 (age 23) Riihimäki, Finland
- Height: 165 cm (5 ft 5 in)
- Weight: 63 kg (139 lb; 9 st 13 lb)
- Position: Defense
- Shoots: Left
- SDHL team Former teams: Brynäs IF: HPK Hämeenlinna; Team Kuortane; KJT Hockey
- National team: Finland
- Playing career: 2017–present
Medal record
World Championship
Bronze medal – third place	2025 Czechia

Oona Koukkula (born 22 August 2003) is a Finnish ice hockey player for Brynäs IF of the Swedish Women's Hockey League (SDHL) and member of the Finnish national ice hockey team.

== Playing career ==
Koukkula began playing ice hockey at an ice hockey school in her hometown of Riihimäki around age nine. The following year, she joined the minor ice hockey department of the Riihimäki-based club Nikkarit and played with its boys teams, as there were no organized girls teams in the area at that time. During the 2016–17 season, she continued to play with Nikkarit boys teams and also played with a boys under-13 (U13) team of Jää-Ahmat in Hyvinkää, a town about 16 km (10 mi) south of Riihimäki.

At age fourteen, she made her debut in the Naisten Liiga (NSML; renamed Auroraliiga in 2024), the national championship women's ice hockey league in Finland, with KJT Hockey in the 2017–18 season. Across eighteen games with KJT that season, she scored one goal and accumulated four penalty minutes. During the 2017–18 campaign, Koukkula also played with the KJT U16 girls team and with various Jää-Ahmat boys teams at the U14 and U15 levels.

In 2018, Koukkula relocated to Kuortane, a village 265 km (165 mi) north of Riihimäki, to attend Kuortaneen urheilulukio and join Team Kuortane. The 2018–19 season marked her first season with Team Kuortane and her first full season played in the Naisten Liiga. She played with Team Kuortane through the 2021–22 season, steadily improving her offensive production from one point on one assist across thirty games in her first season to leading all team defensemen in scoring in her final season, with 3 goals and 14 assists for 17 points in 26 games. Her career with the team culminated in her selection to the Naisten Liiga All-Star second team in 2022.

Kuokkula's career with Team Kourtane came to an end upon the completion of her secondary school studies at Kuortaneen urheilulukio in 2022 and she elected to continue her NSML career with HPK in Hämeenlinna, the capital city of her home region of Kanta-Häme. She was named to the 2023–24 Naisten Liiga All-Star second team at the conclusion of her second season with the team.

In April 2024, Koukkula signed with Brynäs IF in the SDHL on a contract through the 2025–26 season.

== International play ==
As a junior player with the Finnish national under-18 team, Koukkula was recognized by the team coaches as a standout defenseman and she participated in the 2020 IIHF U18 Women's World Championship in Bratislava, Slovakia.

Koukkula made her senior national team debut during pre-Olympic friendlies against Canada in late 2021. She participated in several events of the 2023–24 Women's Euro Hockey Tour, including the Three Nations Tournament in Vierumäki and the Deutschland Cup, during which she earned her first national team point, the secondary assist on a Kiira Yrjänen goal against Germany.

After being officially named to the Finnish roster for the 2024 IIHF Women's World Championship, Koukkula did not travel to Utica, New York, United States with the team and did not play in the tournament.

After appearing with the Finnish national team at multiple tournaments in the 2024–25 Women's Euro Hockey Tour, Koukkula was named to the roster for the 2025 IIHF Women's World Championship.

== Career statistics ==
=== Regular season and playoffs ===
			Regular season					Playoffs
Season	Team	League	GP	G	A	Pts	PIM	GP	G	A	Pts	PIM
2017-18	KJT	NSML	18	1	0	1	4	—	—	—	—	—
2018-19	Team Kuortane	NSML	30	0	1	1	14	4	0	0	0	2
2019-20	Team Kuortane	NSML	28	1	6	7	14	7	0	3	3	2
2020-21	Team Kuortane	NSML	27	2	8	10	12	2	0	0	0	0
2021-22	Team Kuortane	NSML	26	3	14	17	16	3	0	1	1	4
2022-23	HPK	NSML	26	4	9	13	16	8	0	1	1	2
2023-24	HPK	NSML	32	2	17	19	2	8	1	1	2	4
2024-25	Brynäs IF	SDHL	35	0	5	5	4	9	1	3	4	4
Naisten Liiga totals			187	13	55	68	78	32	1	6	7	14

=== International ===
Year	Team	Event	Result	GP	G	A	Pts	PIM
2020	Finland	U18	4th	6	0	0	0	2
2025	Finland	WC	3rd place, bronze medalist(s)	6	0	0	0	0
Junior totals				6	0	0	0	2
Senior totals				6	0	0	0	2

Source: IIHF

== Awards and honors ==
Award	Year
Naisten Liiga
All-Star Second Team	2021–22
All-Star Second Team	2023–24
