= Eve Savander =

Finnish ice hockey player

- Born: 2 September 1998 (age 28) Joensuu, Finland
- Height: 1.66 m (5 ft 5 in)
- Weight: 67 kg (148 lb; 10 st 8 lb)
- Position: Defense
- Shoots: Right
- SDHL team Former teams: Linköping HC: MoDo Hockey; AIK Hockey; Ohio State Buckeyes; KalPa Kuopio; Team Kuortane
- National team: Finland
- Playing career: 2013–present
Medal record
World Championship
Bronze medal – third place	2015 Sweden
Bronze medal – third place	2024 United States

Eve Savander (born 2 September 1998) is a Finnish ice hockey player and member of the Finnish national team. She plays in the Swedish Women's Hockey League (SDHL) with Linköping HC.

With the Finnish national team, she has won two IIHF Women's World Championship bronze medals.

== Playing career ==
Savander played college ice hockey with the Ohio State Buckeyes women's ice hockey program in the Western Collegiate Hockey Association (WCHA) conference of the NCAA Division I during 2018 to 2022.

== International play ==
As a junior player with the Finnish national under-18 team, Savander participated in the IIHF U18 Women's World Championships in 2014, 2015, and 2016.

At age sixteen, she made her senior national team debut as the youngest player on the Finnish roster at the IIHF Women's World Championship in 2015 and won a bronze medal.

Savander next represented Finland at the IIHF Women's World Championship in 2024 and won her second bronze medal. She averaged just one minute and 46 seconds of ice time per game and had the fewest total minutes played (12:26) of any skater on the team.
