= Noemi Neubauerová =

Czech ice hockey player (born 1999)

- Born: 15 December 1999 (age 26) Kolín, Czech Republic
- Height: 1.76 m (5 ft 9 in)
- Weight: 70 kg (154 lb; 11 st 0 lb)
- Position: Forward
- Shoots: Right
- PFWL team Former teams: EV Zug; Toronto Sceptres; Brynäs IF
- National team: Czech Republic
- Playing career: 2011–present
Medal record
World Championship
Bronze medal – third place	2022 Denmark
Bronze medal – third place	2023 Canada

Noemi Neubauerová (born 15 December 1999) is a Czech ice hockey player and member of the Czech national team. She has played with EV Zug Women's Team in the Swiss Women's League (PFWL) since June 2025.

Neubauerová previously played with the Toronto Sceptres in the Professional Women's Hockey League (PWHL) and Brynäs IF in the Swedish Women's Hockey League (SDHL).

== Playing career ==
=== College ===
Neubauerová competed in college ice hockey with the Colgate Raiders from 2018 to 2022, tallying 51 points over 115 games. She then extended her collegiate career as a graduate student with the Providence Friars during the 2022–23 season, recording 26 points in 36 games.

=== Professional ===
In May 2023, Neubauerová agreed to a one-year deal with the Metropolitan Riveters of the Premier Hockey Federation (PHF), shortly before the league was dissolved. After the PHF ceased operations, she signed a two-year contract with Brynäs IF in the Swedish Women's Hockey League (SDHL) in August 2023. On June 10, 2024, Neubauerová was chosen 30th overall in the 5th round of the 2024 PWHL Draft by PWHL Toronto, becoming the club's first European player.

== International play ==
She represented the Czech Republic in the women's ice hockey tournament at the 2022 Winter Olympics in Beijing, marking the nation's first-ever appearance in Olympic women's hockey. In addition to her Olympic debut, she competed in five IIHF Women's World Championships, in 2016, 2019, 2021, 2022 and 2023. Her contributions helped the team achieve historic milestones, including their first-ever bronze medal at the 2022 tournament and a second consecutive bronze in 2023.
