= Dominika Lásková =

Czech ice hockey player (born 1996)

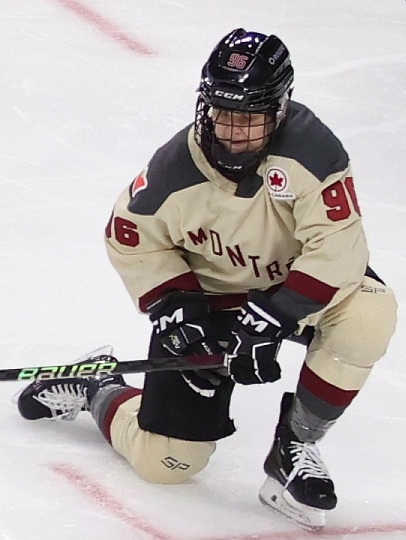
- Lásková with PWHL Montreal in 2024
- Born: 20 December 1996 (age 29) Prague, Czech Republic
- Height: 1.63 m (5 ft 4 in)
- Weight: 71 kg (157 lb; 11 st 3 lb)
- Position: Defense
- Shoots: Right
- PWHL team Former teams: Vancouver Goldeneyes; Montréal Victoire; Merrimack Warriors; HC Slavia Praha; Toronto Six
- National team: Czech Republic
- Playing career: 2011–present
Medal record
World Championship
Bronze medal – third place	2022 Denmark
Bronze medal – third place	2023 Canada

Dominika Lásková (born 20 December 1996) is a Czech professional ice hockey player for the Vancouver Goldeneyes of the Professional Women's Hockey League (PWHL) and a member of the Czech Republic women's national ice hockey team. She played college ice hockey at Merrimack. She played with the women's representative team of HC Slavia Praha in the Czech Women's Extraliga during 2011 to 2016.

== Playing career ==
Lásková was a member of the Toronto Six in 2023, winning the Isobel Cup as champions of the Premier Hockey Federation (PHF).

On September 18, 2023, Lásková was selected in the 4th round, 19th overall by PWHL Montreal in the 2023 PWHL Draft. She was the first Czech player to be affiliated with a PWHL team, as well as the first player drafted who played the previous season in the PHF.

== International play ==
Lásková represented the Czech Republic at the IIHF Women's U18 World Championships in 2012, 2013, and 2014, winning a bronze medal at the 2014 tournament. She first appeared with the Czech senior national team at the final qualification for the women's ice hockey tournament at the 2014 Winter Olympics. She has since appeared with the national team at the 2013 IIHF Women's World Championship, the 2014 IIHF Women's World Championship Division I and Top Division Playoff, and the 2021 IIHF Women's World Championship, 2022 IIHF Women's World Championship and 2023 IIHF Women's World Championship.

== Career statistics ==
=== Regular season and playoffs ===
			Regular season					Playoffs
Season	Team	League	GP	G	A	Pts	PIM	GP	G	A	Pts	PIM
2023–24	PWHL Montréal	PWHL	7	0	0	0	8	-	-	-	-	-
2024–25	Montréal Victoire	PWHL	5	0	0	0	2	-	-	-	-	-
PWHL totals			12	0	0	0	10	-	-	-	-	-
