= Tereza Vanišová =

Czech ice hockey player (born 1996)

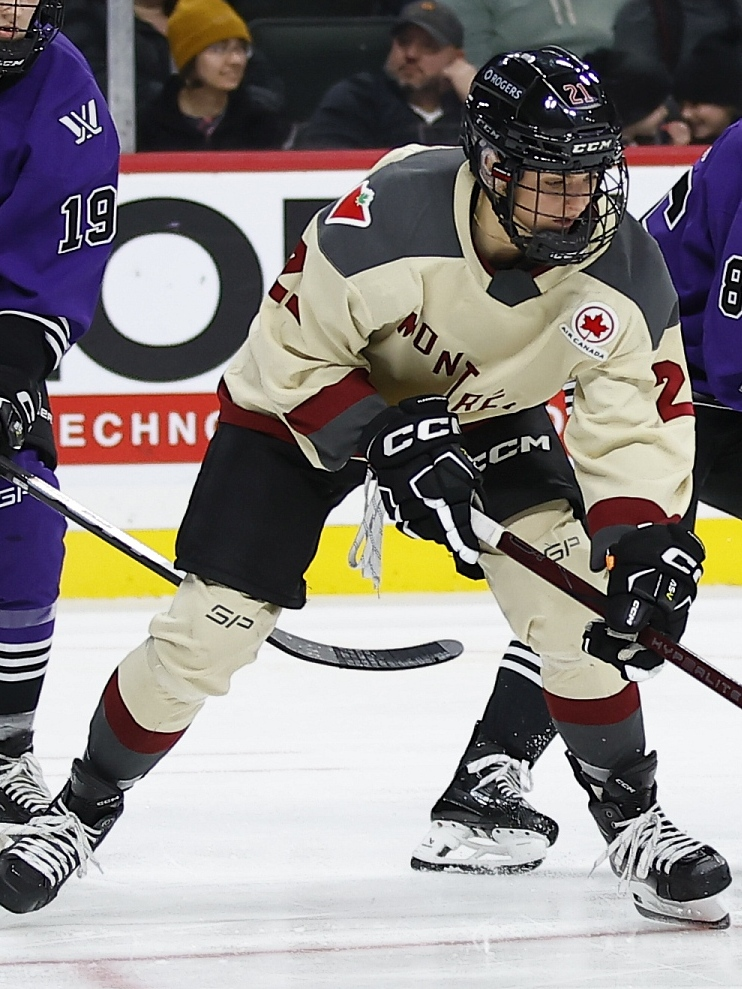
- Vanišová with PWHL Montreal in 2024
- Born: 30 January 1996 (age 30) Strakonice, Czech Republic
- Height: 1.70 m (5 ft 7 in)
- Weight: 62 kg (137 lb; 9 st 11 lb)
- Position: Forward
- Shoots: Left
- PWHL team Former teams: Vancouver Goldeneyes: Ottawa Charge; PWHL Montreal; Toronto Six; Boston Pride; Leksands IF; Maine Black Bears; HC Slavia Praha; HTI Stars
- National team: Czech Republic
- Playing career: 2011–present
Medal record
World Championship
Bronze medal – third place	2023 Canada

Tereza Vanišová (Czech pronunciation: [tɛrɛza vaɲiʃovaː]; born 30 January 1996) is a Czech professional ice hockey player for the Vancouver Goldeneyes of the Professional Women's Hockey League (PWHL) and a member of the Czech Republic women's national ice hockey team.

== College career ==
Across 129 NCAA games played with the Maine Black Bears women's ice hockey program, Vanišová recorded 63 goals and 66 assists for 129 total points. She was named Hockey East Co-Rookie of the Year and the Czech Republic's Female Hockey Player of the Year in 2016–17. The next year she would be named a Hockey East All-Conference Second Team. As of 2021, Vanišová holds the Maine Black Bears women's ice hockey program's all-time career scoring record. She has been noted for her quick and creative playing style.

== Professional career ==
=== Premier Hockey Federation ===
Vanišová won back-to-back Isobel Cup championships with the Boston Pride in 2021 and 2022 in the Premier Hockey Federation. She was also a member of the Toronto Six's 2023 Isobel Cup championship team, making her one of only two players to be a three-time Isobel Cup champion.

=== Professional Women's Hockey League ===
==== Montreal Victoire ====
Vanišová was drafted in the seventh round, 42nd overall, by PWHL Montreal in the 2023 PWHL Draft. She signed a two-year contract with the team in December 2023.

==== Ottawa Charge ====
Vanišová was traded to Ottawa on March 18, 2024, in exchange for defender Amanda Boulier. Vanišová recorded her first PWHL career hat trick on 13 February 2025, in a 8–3 win against the Minnesota Frost. On 20 February 2025, she completed a Gordie Howe hat trick against the Boston Fleet: assisting on a goal in the third period, fighting Boston forward Jill Saulnier, and scoring a goal to tie the game with less than three seconds remaining in regulation. The fight was the first in the league's history, though she was only charged for roughing. During the 2024–25 season, she recorded 15 goals and seven assists in 30 regular season games. Her 15 goals ranked second in the league. During the 2025 PWHL playoffs, she recorded one goal and three assists in eight games.

==== Vancouver Goldeneyes ====
On 17 June 2025, Vanišová signed a two-year contract with the Vancouver Goldeneyes.

== International play ==
With the Czech national under-18 team, she participated in the IIHF U18 Women's World Championships in 2012, 2013, and 2014.

She represented the Czech Republic at the IIHF World Women's Championship in 2013, 2016, 2017, 2019, 2021, 2023, and 2024.

== Career statistics ==
Bold indicates led league

			Regular season					Playoffs
Season	Team	League	GP	G	A	Pts	PIM	GP	G	A	Pts	PIM
2011–12	HC Slavia Praha	Czech Women's Extraliga	7	5	2	7	16	2	2	1	3	2
2011–12	HC Plzeň	Czech Women's Extraliga	2	4	3	7	29	—	—	—	—	—
2012–13	HC Slavia Praha	Czech Women's Extraliga	1	1	0	1	0	1	0	1	1	35
2013–14	HC Slavia Praha	Czech Women's Extraliga	4	2	5	7	4	2	0	2	2	0
2014–15	HC Slavia Praha	Czech Women's Extraliga	8	4	3	7	2	—	—	—	—	—
2015–16	HTI Stars	Can. High School	34	69	22	91	—	—	—	—	—
2016–17	Maine Black Bears	WHEA	28	16	12	28	54	—	—	—	—	—
2017–18	Maine Black Bears	WHEA	37	16	30	46	**74**	—	—	—	—	—
2018–19	Maine Black Bears	WHEA	31	17	7	24	59	—	—	—	—	—
2019–20	Maine Black Bears	WHEA	33	14	17	31	48	—	—	—	—	—
2020–21	Boston Pride	NWHL	7	0	2	2	10	2	1	2	3	15
2021–22	Leksands IF	SDHL	31	15	9	24	45	2	0	0	0	4
2021–22	Boston Pride	PHF	—	—	—	—	—	3	1	1	2	4
2022–23	Toronto Six	PHF	20	5	9	14	6	4	1	1	2	0
2023–24	PWHL Montreal	PWHL	17	2	8	10	**16**	—	—	—	—	—
2023–24	PWHL Ottawa	PWHL	6	0	2	2	**21**	—	—	—	—	—
2024–25	Ottawa Charge	PWHL	30	15	7	22	**38**	8	1	3	4	8
2025–26	Vancouver Goldeneyes	PWHL	30	4	11	15	10	—	—	—	—	—
PWHL totals			83	21	28	49	85	8	1	3	4	8
