= Daniela Pejšová =

Czech ice hockey player (born 2002)

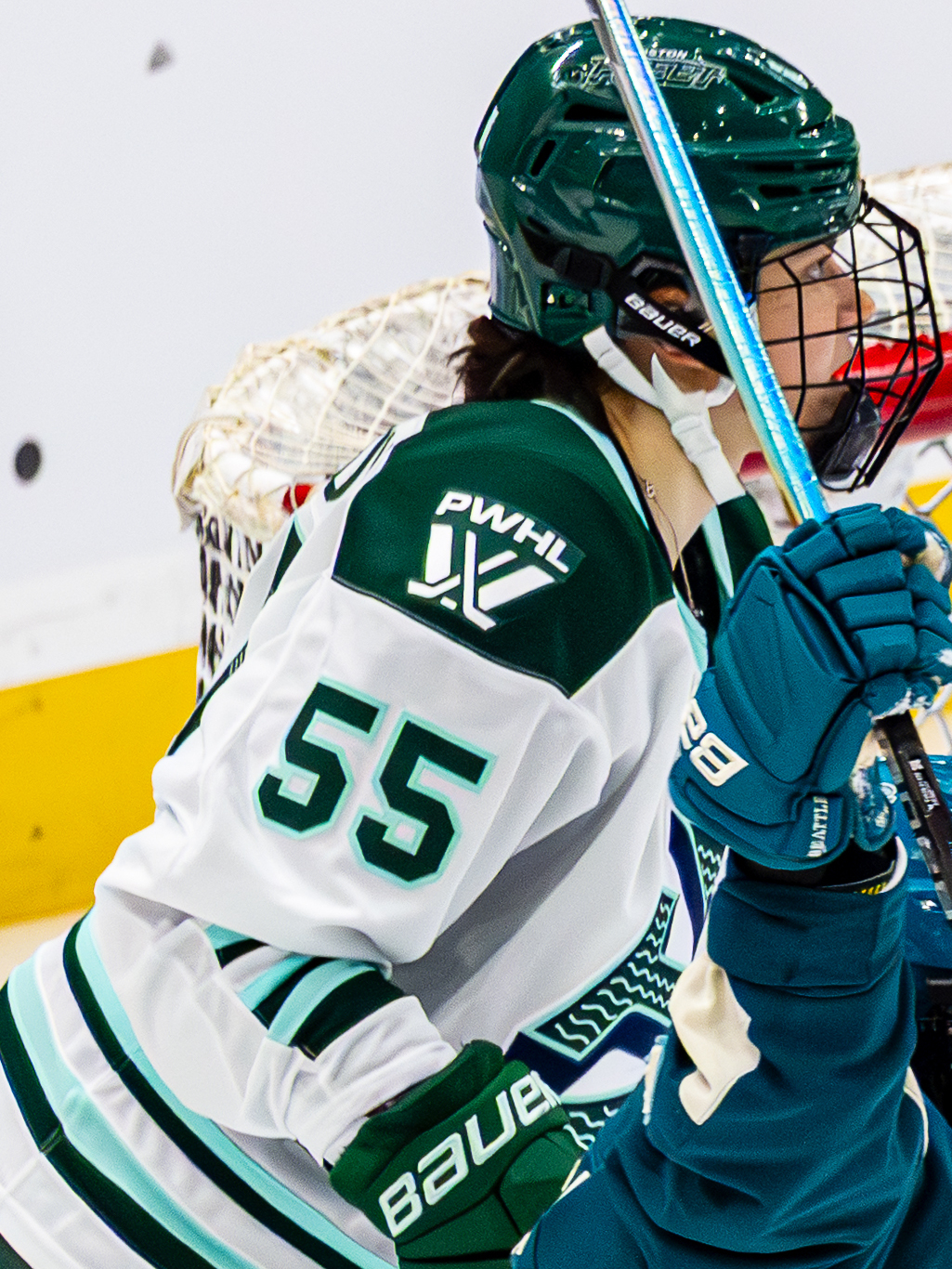
- Pejšová wiith the Boston Fleet in 2026
- Born: 14 August 2002 (age 24) Teplice, Czech Republic
- Height: 1.73 m (5 ft 8 in)
- Weight: 71 kg (157 lb; 11 st 3 lb)
- Position: Defence
- Shoots: Left
- PWHL team Former teams: San Jose Sea Lions; Luleå HF/MSSK; Modo Hockey; Boston Fleet
- National team: Czech Republic
- Playing career: 2012–present
Medal record
World Championship
Bronze medal – third place	2022 Denmark	Ice hockey
Bronze medal – third place	2023 Canada	Ice hockey
World University Games
Bronze medal – third place	2023 Lake Placid	Ice hockey

Daniela Pejšová (born 14 August 2002) is a Czech professional ice hockey player for the San Jose Sea Lions of the Professional Women's Hockey League (PWHL). She previously played for the Boston Fleet of the PWHL, and Luleå HF/MSSK and Modo Hockey of the Swedish Women's Hockey League (SDHL). She is also a member of the Czech Republic women's national ice hockey team.

== Early life ==
Daniela Pejšová was born in a hospital in Teplice, but she is a native of Košťany.

== Playing career ==
On 10 June 2024, Pejšová was selected seventh overall by PWHL Boston in the 2024 PWHL draft.

In two seasons with the Boston Fleet, she recorded two goals and five assists in 55 regular season games. During the league's expansion to 12 teams ahead of the 2026–27 season, she signed a two-year contract with the San Jose Sea Lions on June 14, 2026.

== International play ==
Pejšová represented the Czech Republic at the IIHF Women's World Championships in 2019 and 2021. As a junior player with the Czech national under-18 team, she participated in the IIHF Women's U18 World Championships in 2018, 2019, and 2020.
