= Viktorie Švejdová =

Czech ice hockey goaltender

- Born: 24 June 2002 (age 24) Liberec, Czechia
- Height: 168 cm (5 ft 6 in)
- Weight: 65 kg (143 lb; 10 st 3 lb)
- Position: Goaltender
- Catches: Left
- SDHL team Former teams: HV71: SDE Hockey; MoDo Hockey; HC Bílí Tygři Liberec
- National team: Czech Republic
- Playing career: 2012–present
Medal record
World Championship
Bronze medal – third place	2022 Denmark

Viktorie Švejdová (born 24 June 2002) is a Czech ice hockey goaltender and member of the Czech national ice hockey team. She plays in the Swedish Women's Hockey League (SDHL) with HV71.

== Playing career ==
Švejdová's senior club career began in the Czech Women's 2. liga at age 10 with the women's representative team of HC Bílí Tygři Liberec. In 2017, she began attending the ice hockey academy of Modo Hockey in Örnsköldsvik, Sweden. In Sweden, she had the opportunity to play alongside other elite junior players and with senior league teams, taking on the role of starting goaltender for Modo Hockey 2 in the Damettan, a position she retained for several seasons. She also dressed for games in the J18 Elit with Modo Hockey J18 and played in the J16 Elit with Modo Hockey U16.

During the 2020–21 season and 2021–22 season, Švejdová has played predominantly in the SDHL, serving as Modo's backup netminder behind Czech national team teammate Klára Peslarová.

She signed with SDE Hockey ahead of the 2022–23 SDHL season.

=== International ===
Švejdová made her senior national team debut at the 2021 IIHF Women's World Championship. As a junior player with the Czech national under-18 team, she participated in the IIHF Women's U18 World Championships in 2018 and 2019.

== Career statistics ==
=== International ===
Note: GP = Games played; Min, TOI = Minutes played; W = Wins; L = Losses; T,T/OT = Ties; OTL = Overtime losses; GA = Goals-against; GAA = Goals-against average; SO = Shutouts; SV% = Save percentage;

				Regular season
Year	Team	Event	Result	GP	W	L	T/OT	MIN	GA	SO	GAA	SV%
2022	Czechia	OG	7th	1	0	1	0	40:49	3	0	4.41	0.786
