= Chiara Schultes =

German ice hockey player (born 2005)

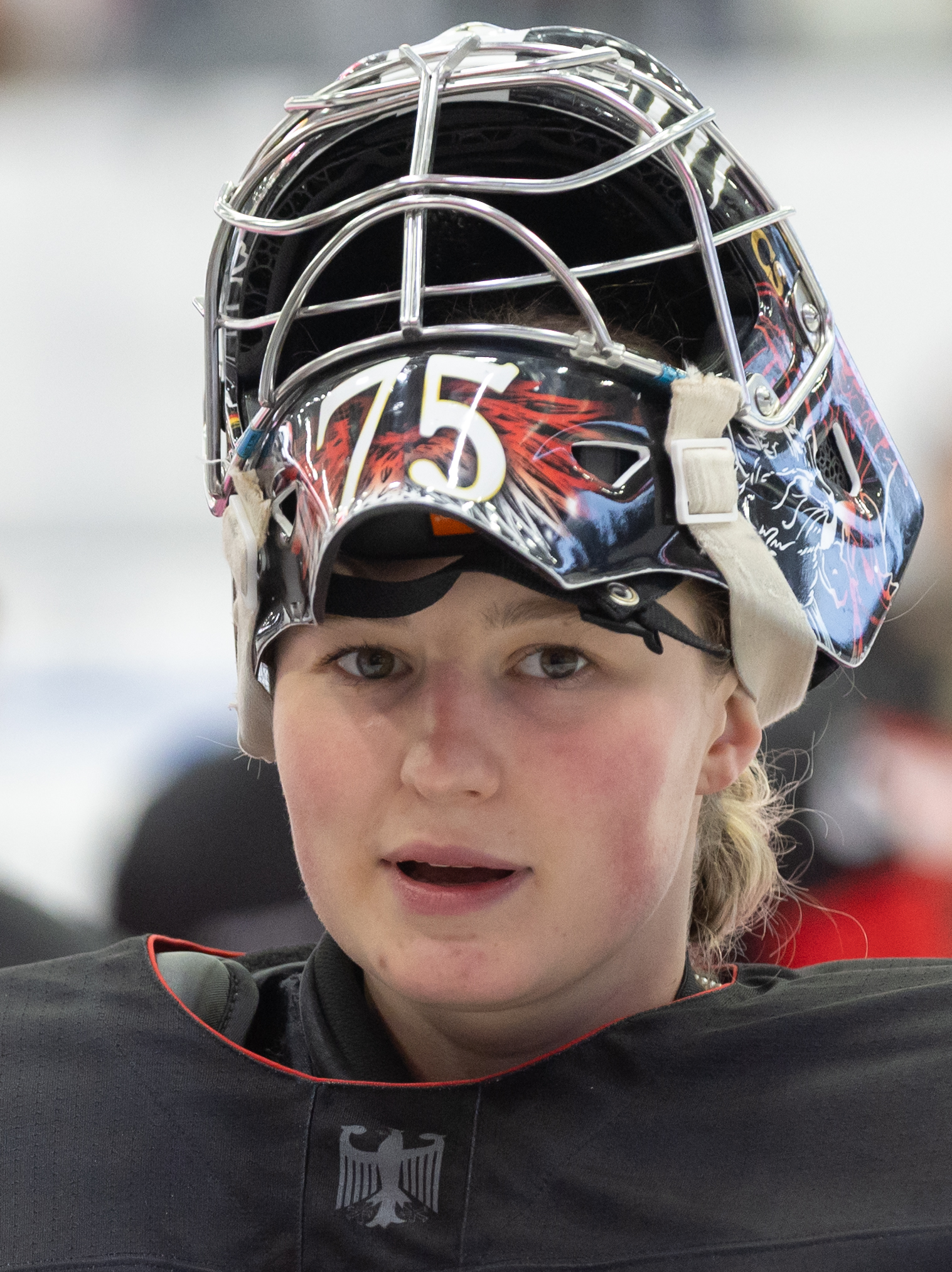
- Schultes in 2026
- Born: 22 July 2005 (age 21) Tirschenreuth, Germany
- Height: 1.68 m (5 ft 6 in)
- Weight: 62 kg (137 lb; 9 st 11 lb)
- Position: Goaltender
- Catches: Right
- DFEL team: ECDC Memmingen
- National team: Germany
- Playing career: 2019–present

Chiara Schultes (born 22 July 2005) is a German ice hockey player. She is a member of the Germany women's national ice hockey team that participated in women's ice hockey Olympics.

== Playing career ==
=== International ===
Schultes was a member of the German roster that won the gold medal at the 2023 IIHF U18 Women's World Championship Division I, Group A competition.
