= Tereza Plosová =

Czech ice hockey player (born 2006)

- Born: 5 July 2006 (age 20) Liberec, Czechia
- Height: 177 cm (5 ft 10 in)
- Weight: 64 kg (141 lb; 10 st 1 lb)
- Position: Forward
- Shoots: Left
- NCAA team Former teams: Minnesota Golden Gophers; Djurgårdens IF
- National team: Czech Republic
- Playing career: 2022–present
Medal record
World Championship
Bronze medal – third place	2023 Canada

Tereza Plosová (born 5 July 2006) is a Czech college ice hockey player for the University of Minnesota of the National Collegiate Athletic Association (NCAA). She is also a member of the Czech national team. She previously played for Djurgårdens IF of the Swedish Women's Hockey League (SDHL).

== Playing career ==
Plosová began her national championship ice hockey career with Djurgårdens IF of the SDHL during the 2023–24 where she recorded eight goals and 15 assists in 33 games. On 13 June 2024, she signed a one-year contract extension with Djurgårdens. During the 2024–25 season, she recorded 17 goals and nine assists in 35 games.

She began her college ice hockey career with the Minnesota Golden Gophers during the 2025–26 season.

== International play ==
Plosová represented the Czech Republic at the 2022 IIHF U18 Women's World Championship, where she recorded three goals and seven assists in five games. She again represented Czech Republic at the 2023 IIHF U18 Women's World Championship, where she recorded three goals and three assists in five games. On 20 March 2023, she was selected to represent the Czech Republic at the 2023 IIHF Women's World Championship, where she made her senior national team debut. During the tournament she recorded one assist in six games and won a bronze medal.

In January 2024, she represented the Czech Republic at the 2024 IIHF U18 Women's World Championship, where she recorded one goal and eight assists in six games and won a silver medal. In April 2024, she then represented the Czech Republic at the 2024 IIHF Women's World Championship, where she recorded one goal and one assist in seven games.

== Career statistics ==
=== Regular season and playoffs ===
Note: GP = Games played; G = Goals; A = Assists; Pts = Points; PIM = Penalty minutes;

			Regular season					Playoffs
Season	Team	League	GP	G	A	Pts	PIM	GP	G	A	Pts	PIM
2023–24	Djurgårdens IF	SDHL	33	8	15	23	14	5	3	0	3	2
2024–25	Djurgårdens IF	SDHL	35	17	9	26	12	4	2	0	2	4
SDHL totals			68	25	24	49	26	9	5	0	5	6

=== International ===
Note: GP = Games played; G = Goals; A = Assists; Pts = Points; PIM = Penalty minutes;

				Regular season
Year	Team	Event	Result	GP	G	A	Pts	PIM
2022	Czech Republic	U18	5th	5	3	7	10	0
2023	Czech Republic	U18	5th	5	3	3	6	2
2023	Czech Republic	WC	3rd place, bronze medalist(s)	6	0	1	1	2
2024	Czech Republic	U18	2nd place, silver medalist(s)	6	1	8	9	4
2024	Czech Republic	WC	4th	7	1	1	2	0
2025	Czech Republic	WC	4th	7	1	0	1	4
2026	Czech Republic	OG	5th	5	1	0	1	0
Junior totals				16	7	18	25	6
Senior totals				25	3	2	5	6
