= Sára Čajanová =

Czech ice hockey player (born 2002)

- Born: 10 December 2002 (age 23) Zlín, Czech Republic
- Height: 168 cm (5 ft 6 in)
- Weight: 63 kg (139 lb; 9 st 13 lb)
- Position: Defense
- Shoots: Left
- SDHL team Former teams: Brynäs IF: HC Valašské Meziříčí; HC Lvi Břeclav; HK Vsetín; HC Cherokees Blansko
- National team: Czech Republic
- Playing career: 2014–present
Medal record
World Championship
Bronze medal – third place	2023 Canada

Sára Čajanová (born 10 December 2002) is a Czech ice hockey player and member of the Czech national team, currently playing in the Swedish Women's Hockey League (SDHL) with Brynäs IF.

== Playing career ==
Her senior club career began in the 1. liga žen at age 11 with HK Vsetín. Čajanová has also played in the Czech national junior leagues at the under-16 (U16) and under-17 (U17) levels and in the 1. liga žen, the second-tier Czech national league for women's ice hockey, with HC Cherokees Blansko, HK Vsetín, HC Lvi Břeclav, and HC Bobři Valašské Meziříčí.

== International play ==
As a junior player with the Czech national under-18 team, she participated in the IIHF Women's U18 World Championships in 2018, 2019, and served as team captain for the 2020 tournament.

Čajanová made her senior Czech Republic national team debut at the 2021 IIHF Women's World Championship. Several months later, she was the Czech Republic's second highest scoring defenceman in the Olympic qualification for the women's ice hockey tournament at the 2022 Winter Olympics, at which the Czech Republic qualified to participate in the Olympic Games for the first time in team history. She again represented the Czech Republic at the 2023 IIHF Women's World Championship, where she recorded one goal and three assists in seven games and won a bronze medal.
