= 2022–23 Euro Hockey Tour (women) =

International ice hockey tournament season

Tournament details
- Host countries: Finland; Sweden; Germany
- Venues: 7 (in 6 host cities)
- Dates: 5 Nations in Vierumäki; 8–12 November 2022; 5 Nations in Ängelholm; 13–17 December 2022; 5 Nations in Füssen; 8–12 February 2023
- Format: Round-robin
- Teams: 5

Final positions
- Champions: Finland
- Runners-up: Czech Republic
- Third place: Sweden
- Fourth place: Switzerland

Tournament statistics
- Games played: 29
- Goals scored: 148 (5.1 per game)
- Scoring leaders: 5 Nations in Vierumäki; (Finland) Noora Tulus (7); 5 Nations in Ängelholm; (Switzerland) Lara Stalder (10); 5 Nations in Füssen; (Finland) Petra Nieminen (7)

The 2022–23 Euro Hockey Tour was the third season of the Euro Hockey Tour (EHT) since the tournament season format was revised and expanded in 2018. It followed the 2019–20 Women's Euro Hockey Tour, as the 2020–21 and 2021–22 instances of the international ice hockey tournament season were not held due to the COVID-19 pandemic.

The season comprised three five-nation tournaments, hosted in Finland, Sweden, and Germany, respectively. The national teams of Czechia, Finland, Germany, Sweden, and Switzerland participated in every tournament. The Russian national team was not invited to participate pursuant to the suspension of Russian teams from participation in all IIHF competitions and events on 1 March 2022 in response to the 2022 Russian invasion of Ukraine.

== Five Nations Tournament in Vierumäki ==
The 2022–23 season began with the Five Nations Tournament in Vierumäki (also stylized as “5 nations tournament”) during 8–12 November 2022. It was principally played at the Vierumäen jäähalli (lit. 'Vierumäki ice hall') and Vierumäki 2, two ice rinks at the Finnish Institute of Sport in Vierumäki, Finland. Single matches were also played at the Gatorade Center in Turku and Trio Areena in Tikkurila.

Finland swept the tournament to claim a decisive victory for the host nation. Finnish players also topped all of the statistics tables: Noora Tulus led tournament scoring with 7 points; Viivi Vainikka scored the most goals, with 5; and Anni Keisala topped the goaltending tables with a 96.3 save percentage and 1.00 goals against average.

=== Standings ===
Pos	Team	Pld	W	L	GF	GA	GD	Pts
1	Finland (H)	4	4	0	14	2	+12	12
2	Sweden	4	2	2	13	6	+7	6
3	Czech Republic	3	2	1	7	5	+2	6
4	Switzerland	4	1	3	4	12	−8	3
5	Germany	3	0	3	0	13	−13	0

Source: Finnish Ice Hockey Association
(H) Hosts

=== Results ===
All times local, Eastern European Time (UTC+02:00)

8 November 2022; 16:00	Germany	0 – 7 (0–3, 0–2, 0–2)	Sweden	Vierumäen jäähalli, Vierumäki; Attendance: 10

Lilly Uhrmann
Goalies
Ida Boman
Referees:
Johanna Tauriainen
Reetta-Kaisa Lusi
Linesmen:
Leevi Parantainen
Onni Halme

0–1	01:36 – Blom (Lundin)
0–2	15:51 – Silén (Wikner Zienkiewicz, Lundin)
0–3	17:20 – Rask (Carlsson, Olsson)
0–4	34:39 – Rask (PP)
0–5	39:43 – Lundin (Blom, Wikner Zienkiewicz)
0–6	43:44 – Olsson (Rask, Carlsson)
0–7	56:14 – Rask (Olsson)

2 min
Penalties
4 min
12
Shots
39

8 November 2022; 19:00	Switzerland	0 – 4 (0–1, 0–0, 0–3)	Finland	Vierumäki 2, Vierumäki; Attendance: 60

Alexandra Lehmann
Goalies
Tiia Pajarinen
Referees:
Kaisa Ketonen
Anniina Nurmi
Linesmen:
Linnea Sainio
Salla-Maaria Raitala

0–1	10:13 – Vainikka (Tulus)
0–2	44:38 – Nieminen (Vesa, Lindstedt)
0–3	46:10 – Holopainen (Tulus, Lindstedt)
0–4	49:09 – Vainikka (Holopainen, Rantala) (PP)

10 min
Penalties
12 min
8
Shots
25

9 November 2022; 16:00	Sweden	0 – 3 (0–1, 0–1, 0–1)	Czech Republic	Vierumäki 2, Vierumäki; Attendance: 10

Frida Axell
Goalies
Viktorie Švejdová
Referees:
Johanna Tauriainen
Reetta-Kaisa Lusi
Linesmen:
Nikita Nikolajevs
Arttu Sopanen

0–1	07:40 – Vanišová (Mrázová, Pejšová)
0–2	35:44 – Pejzlová (SH)
0–3	47:30 – Pejzlová (Přibylová, Mills) (PP)

8 min
Penalties
6 min
15
Shots
28

9 November 2022; 19:00	Switzerland	2 – 0 (0–0, 1–0, 1–0)	Germany	Vierumäen jäähalli, Vierumäki; Attendance: 10

Sandra Heim	Goalies	Felicity Luby	Referees: Kaisa Ketonen; Jenni Jaatinen; Linesmen: Linnea Sainio; Tiina Saarimäki
Stalder (Christen, Leemann) (PP) – 25:47 / 1–0; Ruedi (Surdez, Marti) – 48:45 / 2–0			Referees: Kaisa Ketonen; Jenni Jaatinen; Linesmen: Linnea Sainio; Tiina Saarimäki
4 min	Penalties	10 min	Referees: Kaisa Ketonen; Jenni Jaatinen; Linesmen: Linnea Sainio; Tiina Saarimäki
32	Shots	7	Referees: Kaisa Ketonen; Jenni Jaatinen; Linesmen: Linnea Sainio; Tiina Saarimäki

10 November 2022; 14:30	Finland	3 – 1 (1–0, 0–0, 2–1)	Sweden	Gatorade Center, Turku; Attendance: 826

Anni Keisala
Goalies
Ida Boman
Referees:
Johanna Tauriainen
Kaisa Ketonen
Linesmen:
Johanna Oksanen
Helinä Anttila

Rantala (Tulus, Savolainen) – 19:11	1–0
	1–1	42:31 – Armborg (Olsson, Carlsson)
Savolainen (Tulus, Holopainen) – 47:50	2–1
Vainikka (Tulus) (EN) – 59:50	3–1

2 min
Penalties
4 min
28
Shots
24

10 November 2022; 19:30; Game cancelled due to power outage	Czech Republic	v	Germany	Vierumäen jäähalli, Vierumäki

11 November 2022; 16:00	Germany	0 – 4 (0–1, 0–2, 0–1)	Finland	Vierumäki 2, Vierumäki; Attendance: 43

Lilly Uhrmann
Felicity Luby
Goalies
Emilia Kyrkkö
Referees:
Henna Åberg
Johanna Tauriainen
Linesmen:
Johanna Oksanen
Helinä Anttila

0–1	02:08 – Kaila (Lindstedt, Rakkolainen)
0–2	24:58 – Vesa (Nieminen, Lindstedt)
0–3	25:29 – Hiirikoski (Viitasuo, Säkkinen)
0–4	46:31 – Vainikka (Liikala, Rantala) (PP)

8 min
Penalties
6 min
6
Shots
53

11 November 2022; 17:00	Czech Republic	3 – 2 (1–0, 1–1, 1–1)	Switzerland	Vierumäen jäähalli, Vierumäki; Attendance: 10

Kateřina Zechovská
Goalies
Caroline Spies
Referees:
Anniina Nurmi
Jenni Jaatinen
Linesmen:
Linnea Sainio
Tiina Saarimäki

Pejšová (Lásková, Křížová) – 14:48	1–0
Vanišová (Pejšová, Mrázová)	2–0
	2–1	33:15 – Stalder (SH)
	2–2	40:58 – Kleeb (Stalder, Christen) (PP)
Sarnovská (Čajanová, Kalová) – 44:54	3–2

16 min
Penalties
102 min
27
Shots
10

12 November 2022; 13:30	Finland	3 – 1 (2–0, 0–0, 1–1)	Czech Republic	Trio Areena, Tikkurila; Attendance: 489

Anni Keisala
Goalies
Viktorie Švejdová
Referees:
Anniina Nurmi
Kaisa Ketonen
Linesmen:
Linnea Sainio
Johanna Oksanen

Vainikka (Tulus, Yrjölä) – 01:01	1–0
Nieminen (Savolainen, Rantala) – 11:56	2–0
	2–1	55:32 – Vanišová (Pejšová, Mills) (EA, PP)
Tulus (Yrjölä, Lindstedt) (PP)	3–1

10 min
Penalties
8 min
23
Shots
30

12 November 2022; 14:00	Sweden	5 – 0 (2–0, 1–0, 2–0)	Switzerland	Vierumäen jäähalli, Vierumäki; Attendance: 20

Frida Axell
Goalies
Sandra Heim
Alexandra Lehmann
Referees:
Henna Åberg
Jenni Jaatinen
Linesmen:
Leevi Parantainen
Helinä Anttila

Sundin (Andersson) – 06:09	1–0
Wikner Zienkiewicz (Lundin, Kjellbin) (PP)	2–0
Wikner Zienkiewicz (PP) – 29:11	3–0
Ljungblom (Nylen-Persson, Jungåker) (PP) – 48:54	4–0
Nylen-Persson (Jungåker, Rask) (PP) – 58:17	5–0

6 min
Penalties
16 min
42
Shots
5

Top Scorers

1. (Finland) Noora Tulus (F): 4 GP, 1 G, 6 A, 7 Pts, 0 PIM
2. (Finland) Viivi Vainikka (F): 4 GP, 5 G, 0 A, 5 Pts, 0 PIM
3. (Sweden) Fanny Rask (F): 4 GP, 3 G, 2 A, 5 Pts, 4 PIM
4. (Finland) Rosa Lindstedt (F): 4 GP, 0 G, 5 A, 5 Pts, 2 PIM
5. (Sweden) Felizia Wikner Zienkiewicz (F): 4 GP, 2 G, 2 A, 4 Pts, 0 PIM
6. (Czech Republic) Daniela Pejšová (D): 3 GP, 1 G, 3 A, 4 Pts, 0 PIM
7. (Sweden) Sofie Lundin (F): 4 GP, 1 G, 3 A, 4 Pts, 0 PIM
7. (Sweden) Hanna Olsson (F): 4 GP, 1 G, 3 A, 4 Pts, 0 PIM
7. (Finland) Sanni Rantala (D): 4 GP, 1 G, 3 A, 4 Pts, 0 PIM
10. (Czech Republic) Tereza Vanišová (F): 3 GP, 3 G, 0 A, 3 Pts, 4 PIM

Source: Finnish Ice Hockey Association

Top Goaltenders

1. (Finland) Anni Keisala: 2 GP, 120:00 TOI, 52 SA, 2 GA, 96.3 SV%, 1.00 GAA, 0 SO
2. (Germany) Felicity Luby: 2 GP, 88:38 TOI, 56 SA, 3 GA, 94.4 SV%, 2.03 GAA, 0 SO
3. (Sweden) Ida Boman: 2 GP, 119:12 TOI, 37 SA, 2 GA, 94.9 SV%, 1.01 GAA, 1 SO
4. (Czech Republic) Viktorie Švejdová: 2 GP, 117:53 TOI, 45 SA, 3 GA, 93.8 SV%, 1.53 GAA, 1 SO
5. (Switzerland) Sandra Heim: 2 GP, 100:00 TOI, 28 SA, 3 GA, 90.3 SV%, 1.80 GAA, 1 SO

Source: Finnish Ice Hockey Association

=== Player awards ===
Players of the Game

- GER v SWE: Bernadette Karpf (GER), Fanny Rask (SWE)
- SUI v FIN: Noemi Ryhner (SUI), Viivi Vainikka (FIN)
- SWE v CZE: Hanna Olsson (SWE), Michaela Pejzlová (CZE)
- SUI v GER: Lara Stalder (SUI), Felicity Luby (GER)
- FIN v SWE: Ronja Savolainen (FIN), Lina Ljungblom (SWE)
- CZE v GER: Cancelled due to power outage
- GER v FIN: Heidi Strompf (GER), Petra Nieminen (FIN)
- CZE v SUI: Alena Mills (CZE), Lisa Rüedi (SUI)
- FIN v CZE: Anni Keisala (FIN), Tereza Vanišová (CZE)
- SWE v SUI: Maja Nylén Persson (SWE), Janine Hauser (SUI)

== Five Nations Tournament in Ängelholm ==
The Five Nations Tournament in Ängelholm and Helsingborg (Swedish: 5-nationsturnering i Ängelholm och Helsingborg; also stylized as '5 Nations Tournament') was played during 13 December to 17 December 2022. Matches were held at two venues in Skåne County, Sweden: Catena Arena in Ängelholm and the Olympiarinken in Helsingborg.

The tournament was another dominant showing for the Finns, who again swept all four of their matches. Switzerland placed second, losing only one game, and Swiss players ranked first on the scoring and goaltending statistics tables. Swiss centre Lara Stalder was an offensive powerhouse, scoring 5 goals and 10 points in four games to lead all skaters in goals and points; her 5 assists tied Finnish right winger Noora Tulus for most assists. Switzerland’s Saskia Maurer recorded both the best save percentage (96.5%) and the best goals against average (1.00) of all goaltenders.

=== Standings ===
Pos	Team	Pld	W	OTW	OTL	L	GF	GA	GD	Pts
1	Finland	4	4	0	0	0	18	6	+12	**12**
2	Switzerland	4	3	0	0	1	19	9	+10	**9**
3	Sweden (H)	4	2	0	0	2	12	14	−2	**6**
4	Czech Republic	4	1	0	0	3	10	11	−1	**3**
5	Germany	4	0	0	0	4	1	20	−19	**0**

Source: Swedish Ice Hockey Association
(H) Host

=== Results ===
All times local, Central European Time (UTC+01:00)

13 December 2022; 12:00	Czech Republic	**3 – 4** (3–2, 0–1, 0–1)	**Switzerland**	Olympiarinken, Helsingborg; Attendance: 50

Viktorie Švejdová
Blanka Škodová
Goalies
Andrea Brändli
Referees:
Filip Sandstedt
Anna Hammar
Linesmen:
Jessica Lundgren
Felix Nilsson

Mills (Přibylová) – 07:50	1–0
	1–1	09:30 – Stalder (Ryhner) (DP)
Mlýnková (Vanišová) – 14:54	2–1
Vanišová (Seroiszková) – 18:55	3–1
	3–2	19:05 – Sigrist (Stalder)
	3–3	38:40 – Stalder (SH)
	3–4	48:34 – Hofstetter

2 min
Penalties
6 min
29
Shots
22

13 December 2022; 18:00	**Sweden**	**4 – 1** (1–1, 2–0, 1–0)	Germany	Olympiarinken, Helsingborg; Attendance: 120

Tindra Holm
Goalies
Leonie-Louise Kühberger
Referees:
Ida Henriksson
Reica Staiger
Linesmen:
Pontus Littmar
Anina Egli

Hjalmarsson – 03:40	1–0
	1–1	09:14 – Wagner (Strobel, Haider) (PP1)
Hjalmarsson (Lidman) – 25:54	2–1
Bouveng (Kjellbin) (PP1) – 29:09	3–1
L. Johansson (Thuvik) – 52:08	4–1

12 min
Penalties
6 min
25
Shots
27

14 December 2022; 13:00	Sweden	**2 – 5** (0–1, 1–1, 1–3)	**Switzerland**	Catena Arena, Ängelholm; Attendance: 429

Tindra Holm
Goalies
Saskia Maurer
Referees:
Julia Kainberger
Ida Henriksson
Linesmen:
Ottilia Classon
Hanna Öberg

	0–1	16:02 – Sigrist (Enzler, Rüedi)
L. Johansson (Olsson) – 20:54	1–1
	1–2	26:21 – Müller (Leemann, Marti)
	1–3	40:49 – Stalder (Wetli, Müller) (PP1)
	1–4	55:26 – Ryhner (Quennec, Vallario)
Bouveng (Blom, Silén) – 56:25	2–4
	2–5	58:39 – Zimmermann (Wetli) (EN)

8 min
Penalties
6 min
43
Shots
25

14 December 2022; 17:00	**Finland**	**3 – 2** (1–1, 0–0, 2–1)	Czech Republic	Catena Arena, Ängelholm; Attendance: 46

Anni Keisala
Goalies
Blanka Škodová
Referees:
Reica Staiger
Veronica Lovensnö
Linesmen:
Anina Egli
Jessica Lundgren

Nieminen (Hiirikoski, Tulus) (PP1) – 03:48	1–0
	1–1	12:00 – Mlýnková (Pejzlová, Čajanová)
Nylund (Nieminen) – 41:08	2–1
	2–2	50:15 – Hymlarová (Neubauerová)
Nylund (Savolainen) – 58:48	3–2

4 min
Penalties
4 min
34
Shots
24

15 December 2022; 12:00	Germany	**0 – 4** (0–2, 0–0, 0–2)	**Czech Republic**	Olympiarinken, Helsingborg; Attendance: 65

Sandra Abstreiter
Goalies
Viktorie Švejdová
Referees:
Julia Kainberger
Veronica Lovensnö
Linesmen:
Elias Hardtmann
Ottilia Classon

0–1	04:00 – Čajanová (Hymlarová, Mills)
0–2	10:46 – Mlýnková (Přibylová)
0–3	42:35 – Hymlarová (Seroiszková, Vanišová) (PP1)
0–4	45:19 – Seroiszková (Hymlarová, Mills)

4 min
Penalties
2 min
16
Shots
29

15 December 2022; 18:00	Switzerland	**2 – 4** (2–1, 0–2, 0–1)	**Finland**	Olympiarinken, Helsingborg; Attendance: 35

Andrea Brändli
Goalies
Sanni Ahola
Referees:
Anna Hammar
Reica Staiger
Linesmen:
Anina Egli
Hanna Öberg

Quennec (Enzler, Rüedi) – 07:35	1–0
Rüedi (SH1) – 10:03	2–0
	2–1	15:35 – Rantala (Nylund, Holopainen) (PP2)
	2–2	32:49 – Rakkolainen (Tulus, Savolainen) (PP1)
	2–3	38:43 – Parkkonen (Antti-Roikko, Pirttijärvi)
	2–4	58:41 – Tulus (Holopainen, Vainikka)

14 min
Penalties
2 min
9
Shots
47

16 December 2022; 13:00	**Switzerland**	**8 – 0** (2–0, 4–0, 2–0)	Germany	Catena Arena, Ängelholm; Attendance: 34

Saskia Maurer
Goalies
Leonie-Louise Kühberger
Referees:
Julia Kainberger
Reica Staiger
Linesmen:
Jessica Lundgren
Felix Nilsson

Müller (Stalder) – 04:14	1–0
Müller (Stalder, Christen) – 12:22	2–0
Zimmermann (Rüedi, Marti) (PP1) – 21:14	3–0
Ryhner (Stalder) – 22:11	4–0
Stalder (Müller, Christen) (PP1) – 26:43	5–0
Stalder (Christen, Müller) (PP1) – 33:19	6–0
Müller (Stalder, Ryhner) (PP1) – 45:59	7–0
Zimmermann (Marti, Leemann) – 51:50	8–0

4 min
Penalties
12 min
40
Shots
14

16 December 2022; 17:00	Sweden	**2 – 7** (1–0, 0–6, 1–1)	**Finland**	Catena Arena, Ängelholm; Attendance: 278

Emma Söderberg
Tindra Holm
Goalies
Anni Keisala
Referees:
Anna Hammar
Ida Henriksson
Linesmen:
Ottilia Classon
Anina Egli

Hjalmarsson (Thuvik, L. Johansson) – 18:24	1–0
	1–1	25:29 – Liikala (Nylund, Vainikka)
	1–2	32:04 – Vainikka (Tulus)
	1–3	35:18 – Nieminen (Yrjölä, Savolainen)
	1–4	35:26 – Holopainen (Vainikka, Tulus)
	1–5	36:17 – Savolainen (Kaila)
	1–6	36:58 – Pirttijärvi (Antti-Roikko, Karjalainen)
	1–7	46:43 – Hiirikoski (Nieminen) (PP1)
Blom (Bouveng, L. Johansson) – 52:55	2–7

10 min
Penalties
4 min
22
Shots
43

17 November 2022; 12:00	Germany	**0 – 4** (0–2, 0–2, 0–0)	**Finland**	Catena Arena, Ängelholm; Attendance: 57

Sandra Abstreiter
Goalies
Sanni Ahola
Referees:
Anna Hammar
Veronica Lovensnö
Linesmen:
Jessica Lundgren
Hanna Öberg

0–1	01:27 – Montonen (Kaila, Rakkolainen)
0–2	14:15 – Nieminen (Tulus, Yrjölä) (PP1)
0–3	20:58 – Nieminen (Liikala, Nylund)
0–4	23:34 – Tulus (Lindstedt, Vainikka

12 min
Penalties
4 min
13
Shots
46

17 December 2022; 16:00	**Sweden**	**4 – 1** (1–0, 2–1, 1–0)	Czech Republic	Catena Arena, Ängelholm; Attendance: 108

Emma Söderberg
Goalies
Blanka Škodová
Referees:
Julia Kainberger
Ida Henriksson
Linesmen:
Ottilia Classon
Ludvig Lundgren

L. Johansson (Hjalmarsson, Bouveng) (PP1) – 17:39	1–0
T. Johansson (Andersson, Wikner-Zienkiewicz) – 20:59	2–0
Andersson (Hjalmarsson, L. Johansson) – 26:26	3–0
	3–1	29:09 – Hymlarová (Vanišová, Přibylová)
Hjalmarsson (EN) – 58:32	4–1

6 min
Penalties
2 min
28
Shots
29

Top scorers

Switzerland‘s Lara Stalder was the top scorer of the tournament, netting a tournament-leading 5 goals and 5 assists (tying Finland‘s Noora Tulus for most assists) for 10 points in four games. Both Switzerland and Finland had two players rank in the tournament top-five for scoring – Stalder and Alina Müller for the Swiss, Tulus and Petra Nieminen for the Finns – and Sweden had one player, Sara Hjalmarsson. The top-ten point scorers of the tournament featured four Finnish players (Tulus, Nieminen, Jenniina Nylund, and Viivi Vainikka), three Swedish players (Hjalmarsson, Lisa Johansson, and Josefin Bouveng), three Swiss players (Stalder, Müller, and Noemi Ryhner), and one Czech player, Klára Hymlárová.

Germany was the only team not represented in the top-ten list. The highest scoring German player was Theresa Wagner, who scored the team‘s lone goal in the tournament. She ranked in fortieth place on the scoring table, in a four-way tie with Finland‘s Sanni Rantala, Sweden‘s Thea Johansson, and Switzerland‘s Nadine Hofstetter. Wagner‘s teammates, Celina Haider and Carina Strobel, were the only other Germans to record a point, both registering an assist on Wagner‘s goal.

Note: Bold indicates top scorer on team.

	Player	GP	G	A	Pts	PIM
(Switzerland)	**Lara Stalder**	4	5	5	10	2
(Switzerland)	Alina Müller	4	4	3	7	4
(Finland)	**Noora Tulus**	4	2	5	7	0
(Sweden)	**Sara Hjalmarsson**	4	4	2	6	0
(Finland)	Petra Nieminen	4	4	2	6	2
(Sweden)	Lisa Johansson	4	3	3	6	2
(Czech Republic)	**Klára Hymlarová**	4	3	2	5	0
(Finland)	Jenniina Nylund	4	2	3	5	0
(Finland)	Viivi Vainikka	4	1	4	5	0
(Switzerland)	Noemi Ryhner	4	2	2	4	0
(Sweden)	Josefin Bouveng	4	2	2	4	4

Source: Finnish Ice Hockey Association

Goaltenders

	Player	GP	TOI	SA	GA	SO	S-%	GAA
(Switzerland)	Saskia Maurer	2	120:00	57	2	1	96.5	1.00
(Czech Republic)	Viktorie Švejdová	2	90:02	26	2	1	93.8	1.33
(Switzerland)	Andrea Brändli	2	119:14	75	6	0	92.0	3.01
(Finland)	Anni Keisala	2	120:00	46	4	0	91.3	2.00
(Sweden)	Tindra Holm	3	139:32	67	6	0	91.0	2.58
(Finland)	Sanni Ahola	2	120:00	22	2	1	90.9	1.00
(Germany)	Sandra Abstreiter	2	120:00	76	8	0	89.5	4.00
(Czech Republic)	Blanka Škodová	3	143:40	72	8	0	88.9	3.34
(Sweden)	Emma Söderberg	2	100:00	56	7	0	87.5	4.20
(Germany)	Leonie-Louise Kühberger	2	120:00	65	12	0	81.5	6.00

Source: Finnish Ice Hockey Association

== Five Nations Tournament in Füssen ==
The Women's Euro Hockey Tour Finals were played in Füssen, Germany during 8 to 12 February 2023 at the arena of the Bundesstützpunkt für Eishockey und Curling (lit. 'National Base for Ice Hockey and Curling;' called the 'Füssen National Performance Center' in IIHF documents), previously known as the Bundesleistungszentrum für Eishockey und Curling (BLZ, lit. 'National Training Centre for Ice Hockey and Curling').

Finland earned another four-game sweep to claim first place in every tournament of the 2022–23 season. Six Finns featured on the top-ten scoring list, including top-scorer of the tournament Petra Nieminen (4+3), and Emilia Kyrkkö led all goaltenders with a 96.3 save percentage and 0.33 goals against average in her senior national team debut. Czechia had their strongest showing of the season, winning three of four games to place second in the standings. In third place, Sweden split their games with two wins and two losses, recording a goal difference of +2. Switzerland beat Germany to secure fourth place and tournament host Germany was held winless to finish in fifth.

=== Standings ===
Pos	Team	Pld	W	OTW	OTL	L	GF	GA	GD	Pts
1	Finland	4	4	0	0	0	16	3	+13	12
2	Czech Republic	4	3	0	0	1	13	6	+7	9
3	Sweden	4	2	0	0	2	12	10	+2	6
4	Switzerland	4	1	0	0	3	6	17	−11	3
5	Germany (H)	4	0	0	0	4	3	14	−11	0

Source: German Ice Hockey Federation
(H) Host

=== Results ===
All times local, Central European Time (UTC+01:00)

8 February 2023; 16:00	Germany	1 – 5 (1–1, 0–3, 0–1)	Czech Republic	Bundesstützpunkt Arena, Füssen; Attendance: 50

Franziska Albl
Goalies
Blanka Škodová
Referees:
(Sweden) Julia Hjelmström
(Italy) Anneke Orlandini
Linesmen:
(Czech Republic) Kamila Smetková
(Switzerland) Jennifer Vicha

Bartsch – 01:45	1–0
	1–1	16:08 – Trnková (Mills, Přibylová)
	1–2	31:55 – Pejzlová (Habartová, Mills) (PP2)
	1–3	33:19 – Kosinová (Pejzlová, Přibylová) (PP1)
	1–4	33:45 – Trnková (Seroiszková)
	1–5	53:32 – Pištěková (Plosová) (PP1)

18 min
Penalties
10 min
31
Shots
28

8 February 2023; 20:30	Finland	8 – 2 (4–1, 1–1, 3–0)	Switzerland	Bundesstützpunkt Arena, Füssen; Attendance: 50

Anni Keisala
Goalies
Sandra Heim
Referees:
(Germany) Tijana Haack
(Czech Republic) Martina Zedníková
Linesmen:
(Germany) Julia Strube
(Germany) Melanie Bauer

	0–1	03:04 – Lutz (Stalder, Ryhner)
Havana (Montonen, Karppinen) – 06:50	1–1
Liikala (Nieminen, Lindstedt) – 10:32	2–1
Hiirikoski (Lindstedt, Tulus) (PP1) – 15:41	3–1
Hiirikoski (Havana, Yrjänen) – 16:29	4–1
Savolainen (Rantala, Tulus) – 24:44	5–1
	5–2	29:14 – Zimmermann (Hauser, Marti)
Nieminen (Tulus, Rantala) (PP1) – 56:27	6–2
Vesa (Liikala, Rantala) (PP1) – 59:01	7–2
Havana (Yrjänen, Lindstedt) – 59:58	8–2

8 min
Penalties
10 min
42
Shots
10

9 February 2023; 16:00	Czech Republic	5 – 2 (1–1, 2–0, 2–1)	Sweden	Bundesstützpunkt Arena, Füssen; Attendance: 25

Blanka Škodová
Goalies
Ida Boman
Referees:
(Sweden) Julia Hjelmström
(Czech Republic) Martina Zedníková
Linesmen:
(Germany) Julia Strube
(Czech Republic) Kamila Smetková

Sarnovská (Kalová, Mazancová) (PP1) – 10:09	1–0
	1–1	19:59 – H. Svensson (E. Svensson, Nylén Persson)
Plosová (Pištěková, Šapovalivová) – 22:55	2–1
Bartáková (Mazancová) – 39:11	3–1
Plosová (Pištěková) – 46:04	4–1
Přibylová (Malicka, Mills) – 53:02	5–1
	5–2	57:51 – Lin. Johansson (Holmgren, Andersson)

6 min
Penalties
6 min
16
Shots
30

9 February 2023; 20:30	Finland	3 – 0 (1–0, 1–0, 1–0)	Germany	Bundesstützpunkt Arena, Füssen; Attendance: 60

Emilia Kyrkkö
Goalies
Johanna May
Referees:
(Germany) Tijana Haack
(Italy) Anneke Orlandini
Linesmen:
(Switzerland) Jennifer Vicha
(Germany) Leonie Ernst

Savolainen (Tulus) (PP1) – 05:33	1–0
Nieminen (Rantala, Savolainen) – 21:29	2–0
Nieminen (Liikala) (SH1) – 51:01	3–0

6 min
Penalties
16 min
46
Shots
11

10 February 2023; 15:00	Czech Republic	0 – 1 (0–1, 0–0, 0–0)	Finland	Bundesstützpunkt Arena, Füssen; Attendance: 50

Blanka Škodová	Goalies	Emilia Kyrkkö	Referees: (Sweden) Julia Hjelmström (Germany) Leonie Ernst; Linesmen: (Italy) Anneke Orlandini (Germany) Julia Strube
0–1 / 06:48 – Hiirikoski (Tulus, Savolainen) (PP1)			Referees: (Sweden) Julia Hjelmström (Germany) Leonie Ernst; Linesmen: (Italy) Anneke Orlandini (Germany) Julia Strube
16 min	Penalties	6 min	Referees: (Sweden) Julia Hjelmström (Germany) Leonie Ernst; Linesmen: (Italy) Anneke Orlandini (Germany) Julia Strube
15	Shots	39	Referees: (Sweden) Julia Hjelmström (Germany) Leonie Ernst; Linesmen: (Italy) Anneke Orlandini (Germany) Julia Strube

10 February 2023; 18:30	Switzerland	0 – 5 (0–0, 0–2, 0–3)	Sweden	Bundesstützpunkt Arena, Füssen

Caroline Spies
Goalies
Tindra Holm
Referees:
(Germany) Tijana Haack
(Czech Republic) Martina Zedníková
Linesmen:
(Switzerland) Jennifer Vicha
(Czech Republic) Kamila Smetková

0–1	23:15 – H. Svensson
0–2	29:03 – Blom (Lundin)
0–3	43:17 – Lis. Johansson (Thuvik, Blom)
0–4	44:21 – Lundin (Andersson)
0–5	49:08 – Lin. Johansson (Löwenhielm)

6 min
Penalties
2 min
9
Shots
29

11 February 2023; 13:00	Switzerland	2 – 3 (1–0, 1–1, 0–2)	Czech Republic	Bundesstützpunkt Arena, Füssen

Sandra Heim
Goalies
Denisa Dudková
Referees:
(Germany) Tijana Haack
(Switzerland) Jennifer Vicha
Linesmen:
(Sweden) Julia Hjelmström
(Germany) Leonie Ernst

Rüedi (Lutz, Ryhner) – 00:56	1–0
Leemann (Zimmermann, Wey) – 31:56	2–0
	2–1	33:21 – Plosová (Pejzlová)
	2–2	40:17 – Mills (Čajanová, Plosová) (PP1)
	2–3	48:07 – Mills (Čajanová, Pejzlová) (PP2)

18 min
Penalties
8 min
19
Shots
23

11 February 2023; 16:30	Sweden	4 – 1 (2–0, 1–0, 1–1)	Germany	Bundesstützpunkt Arena, Füssen; Attendance: 56

Ida Boman
Goalies
Franziska Albl
Referees:
(Czech Republic) Martina Zedníková
(Italy) Anneke Orlandini
Linesmen:
(Czech Republic) Kamila Smetková
(Germany) Julia Strube

E. Svensson (Lin. Johansson, Rask) (PP1) – 07:23	1–0
Thuvik (Lundin, Blom) (PP1) – 17:32	2–0
Blom (Lundin, Lis. Johansson) – 36:04	3–0
Lundin (Blom, Nylén Persson) – 44:35	4–0
	4–1	59:36 – Haider (Strompf)

12 min
Penalties
8 min
38
Shots
20

12 February 2023; 12:00	Germany	1 – 2 (1–2, 0–0, 0–0)	Switzerland	Bundesstützpunkt Arena, Füssen

Johanna May
Goalies
Caroline Spies
Referees:
(Czech Republic) Martina Zedníková
(Germany) Tijana Haack
Linesmen:
(Germany) Leonie Ernst
(Czech Republic) Kamila Smetková

	0–1	01:29 – Leemann (Christen, Marti)
Bartsch – 04:29	1–1
	1–2	11:15 – Leemann (Hauser)

10 min
Penalties
4 min
26
Shots
20

12 February 2023; 16:30	Sweden	1 – 4 (1–3, 0–1, 0–0)	Finland	Bundesstützpunkt für Eishockey, Füssen

Tindra Holm
Goalies
Emilia Kyrkkö

	0–1	00:56 – Nieminen (Vanhanen, Liikala)
	0–2	10:49 – Vainikka (Savolainen, Rantala)
Kjellbin (Rask) – 12:47	1–2
	1–3	17:09 – Vanhanen (Nieminen, Rantala)
	1–4	38:31 – Hiirikoski (Yrjölä)

8 min
Penalties
0 min
16
Shots
38

Top scorers

	Player (Pos.)	GP	G	A	Pts	PIM
(Finland)	Petra Nieminen (F)	4	4	3	7	2
(Finland)	Sanni Rantala (D)	4	0	6	6	2
(Czech Republic)	Tereza Plosová (F)	4	3	2	5	0
(Sweden)	Lova Blom (F)	4	2	3	5	2
(Finland)	Ronja Savolainen (D)	4	2	3	5	2
(Sweden)	Sofie Lundin (F)	4	2	3	5	6
(Czech Republic)	Alena Mills (F)	4	2	3	5	6
(Finland)	Noora Tulus (F)	4	0	5	5	0
(Finland)	Jenni Hiirikoski (D)	4	4	0	4	0
(Finland)	Julia Liikala (F)	4	1	3	4	0
(Czech Republic)	Michaela Pejzlová (F)	4	1	3	4	0

Source: Finnish Ice Hockey Association

Goaltenders

	Player	GP	TOI	SA	GA	SO	S-%	GAA
(Finland)	Emilia Kyrkkö	3	180:00	26	1	2	96.3	0.33
(Czech Republic)	Blanka Škodová	3	180:00	58	4	0	93.5	1.33
(Germany)	Johanna May	2	118:38	61	5	0	92.4	2.53
(Sweden)	Tindra Holm	2	120:00	44	4	1	91.7	2.00
(Switzerland)	Caroline Spies	2	120:00	49	6	0	89.1	3.00
(Germany)	Franziska Albl	2	120:00	57	9	0	86.4	4.50
(Sweden)	Ida Boman	2	117:51	30	6	0	83.3	3.05
(Switzerland)	Sandra Heim	2	119:10	54	11	0	83.1	5.54

Source: Finnish Ice Hockey Association

==== Player awards ====
Players of the Game

- FIN vs SUI: Oona Havana (FIN)
- FIN vs GER: Petra Nieminen (FIN)
- CZE vs FIN: Emilia Kyrkkö (FIN)
- SWE vs FIN: Jenni Hiirikoski (FIN)

== Final standings ==
Pos	Team	Pld	W	OTW	OTL	L	GF	GA	GD	Pts
1	Finland	12	12	0	0	0	48	11	+37	36
2	Czech Republic	11	6	0	0	5	30	22	+8	18
3	Sweden	12	6	0	0	6	37	30	+7	18
4	Switzerland	12	5	0	0	7	29	38	−9	15
5	Germany	11	0	0	0	11	4	47	−43	0

Source: Finnish Ice Hockey Association, Swedish Ice Hockey Association, German Ice Hockey Federation
