= 2026–27 Women's Euro Hockey Tour =

International ice hockey tournament season

Tournament details
- Host countries: Switzerland; Finland; Sweden; Czechia
- Dates: 4-Nations in Kloten; 19–22 August 2026; 4-Nations in Lahti; 30 September–3 October; Lidl Hockey Games; 28–31 October 2026; 4-Nations in Czechia; 5–11 April 2027
- Format: Round-robin
- Teams: 4

Tournament statistics
- Games played: 12
- Goals scored: 57 (4.75 per game)
- Attendance: 9,685 (807 per game)
- Scoring leaders: 4-Nations in Kloten; (Switzerland) Lara Stalder (4); 4-Nations in Lahti; (Finland) Elisa Holopainen (6)
- All statistics correct as of 3 October 2026.

The 2026–27 Women's Euro Hockey Tour is the third Women's Euro Hockey Tour (WEHT) season following the joint commitment of Czechia, Finland, Sweden, and Switzerland to host and participate in the annual ice hockey tour through 2028. It is the seventh season since the formal revision and expansion of the tournament format.

The season comprises four tournaments, hosted in Switzerland, Finland, Sweden, and Czechia, respectively. The national teams of Czechia, Finland, Sweden, and Switzerland are scheduled to participate in all four tournaments.

The International Ice Hockey Federation selected to "reimagine the international calendar" and shifted the annual Top Division tournament of the IIHF Women's World Championship from April to November, starting in November 2026. The change disrupted the WEHT season and resulted in the 4-Nations tournament in Czechia having to be scheduled after the World Championship – a first in WEHT history.

== 4-Nations Tournament in Kloten ==
The 2026–27 season began in Switzerland with the 4-Nations Tournament in Kloten during 19 to 22 August 2026. SWISS Arena in Kloten, Canton of Zürich hosted all matches.

Sweden followed up their victory from the final tournament of the 2025–26 Women's Euro Hockey Tour with a first-place finish in the opening tournament of the 2026–27 season, narrowly edging out host nation Switzerland by one point.

=== Standings ===
Pos	Team	Pld	W	OTW	OTL	L	GF	GA	GD	Pts
1	Sweden	3	2	0	0	1	8	6	+2	6
2	Switzerland (H)	3	1	1	0	1	9	7	+2	5
3	Finland	3	1	0	1	1	6	7	−1	4
4	Czechia	3	1	0	0	2	5	8	−3	3

Source: Suomen Jääkiekkoliitto
(H) Host

=== Results ===
Game times are local (UTC+2)
Abbreviations: PP = Power play goal (+1 advantage); EN = Empty net goal; PS = Penalty shot

19 August 2026; 16:30	Czechia	1–3 (1–2, 0–0, 0–1)	Finland	SWISS Arena, Kloten; Attendance: 101

Klára Peslarová
Aneta Šenková
Goalies
Sanni Ahola
Referees:
Tim Tzirtziganis
Jana Platzer
Linesmen:
Domenica Maurer
Jennifer Salzmann

	0–1	14:59 – Juusela (Vanhanen, Schalin)
	0–2	17:52 – Vanhanen
Šapovalivová (Vanišová) – 19:27	1–2
	1–3	59:46 – EN – Vainikka

8 min
Penalties
10 min

19 August 2026; 19:00	Switzerland	4–2 (2–1, 1–0, 1–1)	Sweden	SWISS Arena, Kloten; Attendance: 518

Saskia Maurer
Goalies
Ebba Svensson Träff
Referees:
Reica Staiger
Aisha O'Brien
Linesmen:
Jennifer Vicha
Wang Hui

	0–1	00:46 – Jungåker
Herzig (Rossel) – 09:51	1–1
Stalder (Wey, Herzig) – 19:37	2–1
A. Müller – 26:29	3–1
	3–2	46:42 – H. Svensson (T. Johansson)
A. Müller (Frey, N. Müller) – 52:20	4–2

8 min
Penalties
12 min

21 August 2026; 16:30	Sweden	4–2 (1–0, 2–1, 1–1)	Czechia	SWISS Arena, Kloten; Attendance: 120

Ida Boman
Goalies
Klára Peslarová
Referees:
Anneke Orlandini
Karin Williner
Linesmen:
Domenica Maurer
Michèle Müller

Nylén Persson (Grillfors, Thuvik) – 11:08	1–0
H. Svensson (Jungåker, Thuvik) – PP – 23:20	2–0
H. Svensson (T. Johansson) – 32:30	3–0
	3–1	37:30 – PP – Čajanová (Tejralová)
	3–2	51:41 – PP – Plosová (Tejralová)
Ljungblom (Thuvik) – PP – 57:09	4–2

20 min
Penalties
22 min

21 August 2026; 20:00	Switzerland	4–3 OT (0–0, 1–1, 2–2) (OT: 1–0)	Finland	SWISS Arena, Kloten; Attendance: 712

Andrea Brändli
Goalies
Emilia Kyrkkö
Referees:
Reica Staiger
Fabienne Stucki
Linesmen:
Jamie Monard
Jennifer Salzmann

	0–1	31:04 – Vanhanen (Vainikka, Hiirikoski)
Stalder (Baechler) – 39:18	1–1
Balzer (Vallario, Enzler) – 44:33	2–1
	2–2	45:54 – Schalin
	2–3	49:12 – Juusela (Schalin)
Stalder – PS – 57:10	3–3
A. Müller (Stalder) – 63:49	4–3

4 min
Penalties
4 min
37
Shots
42

22 August 2026; 12:00	Finland	0–2 (0–0, 0–0, 0–2)	Sweden	SWISS Arena, Kloten; Attendance: 155

Sanni Ahola	Goalies	Ebba Svensson Träff	Referees: Anneke Orlandini; Fabienne Stucki; Linesmen: Anina Schüpbach; Jennifer Vicha
0–1 / 58:19 – PP – Lundin (Nylén Persson, Grillfors); 0–2 / 59:46 – EN – T. Johansson (H. Svensson)			Referees: Anneke Orlandini; Fabienne Stucki; Linesmen: Anina Schüpbach; Jennifer Vicha
6 min	Penalties	10 min	Referees: Anneke Orlandini; Fabienne Stucki; Linesmen: Anina Schüpbach; Jennifer Vicha
34	Shots	29	Referees: Anneke Orlandini; Fabienne Stucki; Linesmen: Anina Schüpbach; Jennifer Vicha

22 August 2026; 16:00	Switzerland	1–2 (0–0, 0–1, 1–1)	Czechia	SWISS Arena, Kloten; Attendance: 906

Andrea Brändli
Goalies
Julie Pejšová
Referees:
Reica Staiger
Karin Williner
Linesmen:
Jamie Monard
Maria Hauhia

	0–1	23:30 – Pejšová (Pejzlová, Plosová)
	0–2	50:11 – PP – Pejzlová (Gildainová)
Balzer (Enzler, Marti) – 52:44	1–2

4 min
Penalties
6 min
32
Shots
25

== 4-Nations Tournament in Lahti ==
The second tournament of the 2026–27 season was the 4 Nations Tournament in Lahti in Finland during 30 September to 3 October 2026. All games were played at Wemasto Areena in Lahti.

Finland claimed a decisive tournament victory after sweeping the tournament with three regulation wins. Sanni Ahola allowed just two goals against the host nation across three games and left winger Elisa Holopainen led all skaters in goals and points, with four goals and six points.

=== Standings ===
Pos	Team	Pld	W	OTW	OTL	L	GF	GA	GD	Pts
1	Finland (H)	3	3	0	0	0	12	2	+10	9
2	Sweden	3	2	0	0	1	11	6	+5	6
3	Switzerland	3	0	1	0	2	4	11	−7	2
4	Czechia	3	0	0	1	2	2	10	−8	1

Source: Suomen Jääkiekkoliitto
(H) Host

=== Results ===
Game times are local (UTC+3)
Abbreviations: PP = Power play goal (+1 advantage); SH = Short handed goal (–1 advantage); EA = Extra attacker

30 September 2026; 12:30	Sweden	5–0 (0–0, 3–0, 2–0)	Switzerland	Wemasto Areena, Lahti; Attendance: 147

Lisa Jönsson
Goalies
Andrea Brändli
Referees:
Ilona Aho
Reetta-Kaisa Lusi
Linesmen:
Helinä Anttila
Aino Ranki

Grillfors (Nylén-Persson, Hallin) – PP – 21:53	1–0
Grillfors (Thuvik) – 31:13	2–0
T. Johansson (Nylén-Persson) – 31:57	3–0
Grillfors (Ljungblom) – 43:44	4–0
Hallin (Hedqvist, T. Johansson) – 44:33	5–0

6 min
Penalties
6 min
40
Shots
15

30 September 2026; 18:00	Finland	2–0 (0–0, 1–0, 1–0)	Czechia	Wemasto Areena, Lahti; Attendance: 323

Sanni Ahola	Goalies	Klára Peslarová	Referees: Anniina Nurmi; Salla-Maaria Raitala; Linesmen: Julia Halme; Eleonoora Mikkonen
Holopainen (Karvinen, Tapani) – PP – 34:47 / 1–0; Nieminen (Koukkula, Karvinen) – 53:47 / 2–0			Referees: Anniina Nurmi; Salla-Maaria Raitala; Linesmen: Julia Halme; Eleonoora Mikkonen
6 min	Penalties	12 min	Referees: Anniina Nurmi; Salla-Maaria Raitala; Linesmen: Julia Halme; Eleonoora Mikkonen
38	Shots	21	Referees: Anniina Nurmi; Salla-Maaria Raitala; Linesmen: Julia Halme; Eleonoora Mikkonen

2 October 2026; 14:00	Czechia	0–5 (0–2, 0–1, 0–2)	Sweden	Wemasto Areena, Lahti; Attendance: 67

Klára Peslarová
Veronika Ortová
Goalies
Emma Söderberg
Referees:
Reetta-Kaisa Lusi
Salla-Maaria Raitala
Linesmen:
Helinä Anttila
Henni Rantala

0–1	07:38 – Hedqvist (Hallin, T. Johansson)
0–2	07:53 – Löwenhielm (Sundin)
0–3	33:19 – Thuvik (Nylén Persson, Ljungblom)
0–4	47:58 – PP – Bouveng (Thuvik, Lundin)
0–5	50:15 – Bouveng (Holmgren, Hedqvist)

6 min
Penalties
4 min
32
Shots
21

2 October 2026; 18:00	Finland	4–1 (1–1, 3–0, 0–0)	Switzerland	Wemasto Areena, Lahti; Attendance: 352

Sanni Ahola
Goalies
Saskia Maurer
Referees:
Ilona Aho
Anniina Nurmi
Linesmen:
Aino Ranki
Ilona Silander

Holopainen (Tapani, Parkkonen) – 00:31	1–0
	1–1	05:34 – Vallario (Enzler, Stalder)
Holopainen (Koukkula, Tapani) – 20:13	2–1
Nuutinen (Vainikka, Hiirikoski) – 35:55	3–1
Karvinen – 37:27	4–1

2 min
Penalties
2 min
41
Shots
14

3 October 2026; 14:00	Switzerland	3–2 GWS (0–0, 0–0, 2–2) (OT: 0–0) (SO: 1–0)	Czechia	Wemasto Areena, Lahti; Attendance: 91

Andrea Brändli
Goalies
Klára Peslarová
Referees:
Anniina Nurmi
Salla-Maaria Raitala
Linesmen:
Aino Ranki
Henni Rantala

	0–1	51:27 – Jarabková (Kaltounková)
	0–2	52:41 – Vanišová (Juříčková)
Enzler (Stalder, Vallario) – EA – 56:56	1–2
Leemann (Enzler) – EA – 58:53	2–2

Enzler (miss)
Leemann (miss)
Stalder (miss)
Herzig (miss)
Balzer
Shootout
(miss) Kaltounková
(miss) Lásková
(miss) Juříčková
(miss) Vanišová
(miss) Mrázová
4 min
Penalties
4 min
10
Shots
43

3 October 2026; 18:00	Finland	6–1 (2–0, 3–1, 1–0)	Sweden	Wemasto Areena, Lahti; Attendance: 511

Sanni Ahola
Goalies
Emma Söderberg
Referees:
Ilona Aho
Reetta-Kaisa Lusi
Linesmen:
Helinä Anttila
Ilona Silander

Vainikka (Tulus, Nuutinen) – 04:53	1–0
Nieminen (Hiirikoski, Holopainen) – 17:45	2–0
Holopainen (Tapani, Hiirikoski) – PP – 25:34	3–0
Tapani (Hiirikoski, Nieminen) – PP – 26:54	4–0
Nuutinen (Vainikka, Laitinen) – SH – 27:35	5–0
	5–1	32:04 – Nylén Persson
Tapani (Holopainen, Nieminen) – 56:34	6–1

4 min
Penalties
8 min
39
Shots
18

=== Player statistics ===
Top scorers

Finnish players led the scoring statistics across the three game series, with players slotting in as the top three point earners of the tournament, and five Finns ranked in the top-ten. First liner Elisa Holopainen led all tournamnt skaters, with four goals and six points, followed closely by first line centre Susanna Tapani, who notched two goals and six points. Third line centre Petra Nieminen rounded out the top-three with two goals and four points.

Sweden also had five players ranked in the top-ten, led by Maja Nylén Persson, who was Sweden's best point-earner and also the highest scoring defenseman of the tournament, tallying one goal and three assists to place fourth overall.

Rahel Enzler scored one goal and three points to lead all Swiss skaters and rank fourteenth overall.

Czechia's headliners were right winger Tereza Vanišová and seventeen year old defender Ellen Jarabková, who tied for twenty-first place with one goal each.

The following table lists the top-ten point scorers of the tournament. Note that three players tied for eighth place in the rankings.

	Player	GP	G	A	Pts	PIM
(Finland)	Elisa Holopainen	3	4	2	6	2
(Finland)	Susanna Tapani	3	2	4	6	8
(Finland)	Petra Nieminen	3	2	2	4	0
(Sweden)	Maja Nylén Persson	3	1	3	4	2
(Finland)	Jenni Hiirikoski	3	0	4	4	0
(Sweden)	Tilde Grillfors	3	3	0	3	2
(Finland)	Emma Nuutinen	3	2	1	3	0
(Sweden)	Ebba Hedqvist	3	1	2	3	0
(Sweden)	Thea Johansson	3	1	2	3	0
(Sweden)	Hanna Thuvik	3	1	2	3	0

Goaltenders

Swedish goalie Lisa Jönsson repelled all fifteen shots against to earn a shutout in her only game played and secure her place on the top of the goaltending table in both save percentage and goals against average. Jönsson's goalie partner, Emma Söderberg, was in net for Sweden's other two games. She celebrated a shutout against Switzerland but then sacrificed six goals to Finland to wrap up the tournament with a 91.5 save percentage and 3.00 goals against average.

Sanni Ahola was the starting netminder for all three of Finland's matches and recorded the highest time on ice of the tournament. She tallied three wins, of which one was a shutout, and turned away 51 of 53 shots to end the series with an excellent 96.2 save percentage and 0.67 goals against average.

Switzerland was backstopped by the duo of Andrea Brändli and Saskia Maurer. Brändli played two games, during which she turned aside 75 of 82 shots against to earn a 91.5 save percentage, and Maurer turned away 37 of 41 shots to earn a save percentage of 90.2.

Czechia's starter, Klára Peslarová, struggled in the tournament and recorded the poorest save percentage, at 85.1. She was twice shutout in regulation time and a Leoni Balzer goal scored on Peslarová in the shootout left Czechia with a 0–3 game record. The only other Czech to see time in net was eighteen year old rookie Veronika Ortová, who played seven minutes against Sweden and turned away all three shots faced in that time.

The following table lists all goaltenders who recorded time on ice during the tournament, sorted by save percentage.

	Player	GP	TOI	W	L	SA	GA	SO	Sv%	GAA
(Sweden)	Lisa Jönsson	1	60:00	1	0	15	0	1	100	0.00
(Czech Republic)	Veronika Ortová	1	7:32	0	0	3	0	0	100	0.00
(Finland)	Sanni Ahola	3	180:00	3	0	53	2	1	96.2	0.67
(Sweden)	Emma Söderberg	2	120:00	1	1	71	6	1	91.5	3.00
(Switzerland)	Andrea Brändli	2	122:49	0	1	82	7	0	91.5	3.42
(Switzerland)	Saskia Maurer	1	60:00	0	1	41	4	0	90.2	4.00
(Czech Republic)	Klára Peslarová	3	172:19	0	2	67	10	0	85.1	3.48

== Lidl Hockey Games ==
The Lidl Hockey Games in Sweden were the last friendly tournament for the four participating nations ahead of the 2026 IIHF Women's World Championship. Games were played at Scaniarinken in Södertälje during 28 to 31 October 2026.

=== Standings ===
Pos	Team	Pld	W	OTW	OTL	L	GF	GA	GD	Pts
1	Sweden (H)	3	2	1	0	0	5	0	+5	8
2	Czechia	3	2	0	0	1	11	5	+6	6
3	Finland	3	1	0	0	2	5	6	−1	3
4	Switzerland	3	0	0	1	2	2	12	−10	1

Source: Svenska Ishockeyförbund
(H) Host

=== Results ===
Game times are local (UTC+1)
Abbreviations: PP = Power play goal (+1 advantage); EN = Empty net goal

28 October 2026; 15:00	Finland	4–0 (0–0, 2–0, 2–0)	Switzerland	Scaniarinken, Södertälje; Attendance: 156

Sanni Ahola
Goalies
Andrea Brändli
Referees:
Sabina Kuller
Hanna Öberg
Linesmen:
Tova Andersson
Ottilia Classon

Vainikka (Salonen) – 23:07	1–0
Tapani (Nieminen, Yrjölä) – 38:48	2–0
Juusela (Nylund, Parkkonen) – 46:36	3–0
Tulus (Yrjölä) – 54:42	4–0

6 min
Penalties
4 min
25
Shots
7

28 October 2026; 19:00	Czechia	0–2 (0–0, 0–1, 0–1)	Sweden	Scaniarinken, Södertälje; Attendance: 1060

Klára Peslarová	Goalies	Ebba Svensson Träff	Referees: Anna Hammar; Veronica Lovensnö; Linesmen: Eva Harrison; Wilma Gustafsson
0–1 / 35:29 – Jungåker (L. Johansson, H. Svensson); 0–2 / 59:08 – EN – Hjalmarsson			Referees: Anna Hammar; Veronica Lovensnö; Linesmen: Eva Harrison; Wilma Gustafsson
4 min	Penalties	10 min	Referees: Anna Hammar; Veronica Lovensnö; Linesmen: Eva Harrison; Wilma Gustafsson
12	Shots	17	Referees: Anna Hammar; Veronica Lovensnö; Linesmen: Eva Harrison; Wilma Gustafsson

30 October 2026; 15:00	Finland	1–4 (0–3, 1–0, 0–1)	Czechia	Scaniarinken, Södertälje; Attendance: 171

Emilia Kyrkkö
Goalies
Aneta Šenková
Daniela Nováková
Referees:
Sabina Küller
Anna Hammar
Linesmen:
Eva Harrison
Ottilia Classon

	0–1	10:35 – Mrázová
	0–2	16:04 – Neubauerová (Kaltounková)
	0–3	17:38 – Pejšová (Mlýnková, Mrázová)
Holopainen (Laitinen) – 21:27	1–3
	1–4	52:39 – Kaltounková (Pištěková)

6 min
Penalties
4 min
24
Shots
28

30 October 2026; 19:00	Sweden	1–0 OT (0–0, 0–0, 0–0) (OT: 1–0)	Switzerland	Scaniarinken, Södertälje; Attendance: 1045

Emma Söderberg	Goalies	Saskia Maurer	Referees: Veronica Lovensnö; Hanna Öberg; Linesmen: Wilma Gustafsson; Tova Andersson
Hjalmarsson (Jungåker, Blom) – 64:14 / 1–0			Referees: Veronica Lovensnö; Hanna Öberg; Linesmen: Wilma Gustafsson; Tova Andersson
6 min	Penalties	4 min	Referees: Veronica Lovensnö; Hanna Öberg; Linesmen: Wilma Gustafsson; Tova Andersson
50	Shots	14	Referees: Veronica Lovensnö; Hanna Öberg; Linesmen: Wilma Gustafsson; Tova Andersson

31 October 2026; 14:30	Switzerland	2–7 (1–3, 1–3, 0–1)	Czechia	Scaniarinken, Södertälje; Attendance: 208

Andrea Brändli
Chiara Pfosi
Goalies
Daniela Nováková
Aneta Šenková
Referees:
Veronica Lovensnö
Hanna Öberg
Linesmen:
Eva Harrison
Wilma Gustafsson

	0–1	03:18 – Šapovalivová (Gildainová, Mrázová)
	0–2	12:44 – Hymlárová (Čajanová)
	0–3	18:15 – Pištěková (Juříčková, Plosová)
A. Müller (Leemann, Zimmermann) – 10:45	1–3
	1–4	21:26 – Mlýnková (Mrázová, Pejšová)
	1–5	26:47 – Čabelová (Neubauerová)
	1–6	39:42 – Mrázová (Mlýnková, Neubauerová)
Enzler (Vallario, N. Müller) – 27:10	2–6
	2–7	51:51 – PP – Hymlárová (Kaltounková, Mlýnková)

12 min
Penalties
6 min
12
Shots
48

31 October 2026; 18:30	Sweden	2–0 (1–0, 1–0, 0–0)	Finland	Scaniarinken, Södertälje; Attendance: 3042

Ebba Svensson Träff	Goalies	Sanni Ahola	Referees: Anna Hammar; Sabina Küller; Linesmen: Ottilia Classon; Tova Andersson
Hjalmarsson (Svensson Träff) – 08:51 / 1–0; Hallin (Thuvik, Blom) – 37:00 / 2–0			Referees: Anna Hammar; Sabina Küller; Linesmen: Ottilia Classon; Tova Andersson
4 min	Penalties	0 min	Referees: Anna Hammar; Sabina Küller; Linesmen: Ottilia Classon; Tova Andersson
18	Shots	29	Referees: Anna Hammar; Sabina Küller; Linesmen: Ottilia Classon; Tova Andersson

=== Player statistics ===
Top scorers

The following table lists the top-ten point scorers of the tournament. Note that two players tied for fourth place in the rankings and three players tied for seventh place.

	Player	GP	G	A	Pts	PIM
(Czech Republic)	Kateřina Mrázová	3	2	3	5	
(Czech Republic)	Natálie Mlýnková	3	1	3	4	
(Sweden)	Sara Hjalmarsson	3	3	0	3	
(Czech Republic)	Kristýna Kaltounková	3	1	2	3	
(Czech Republic)	Noemi Neubauerová	3	1	2	3	
(Czech Republic)	Klára Hymlárová	3	2	0	2	
(Sweden)	Mira Jungåker	3	1	1	2	
(Czech Republic)	Daniela Pejšová	3	1	1	2	
(Czech Republic)	Tereza Pištěková	3	1	1	2	
(Finland)	Siiri Yrjölä	2	0	2	2	

Goaltenders

The following table lists all goaltenders who recorded time on ice during the tournament, sorted by save percentage.

	Player	GP	TOI	W	L	SA	GA	SO	Sv%	GAA
(Sweden)	Ebba Svensson Träff	2	120:00	2	0	41	0	2	100	0.00
(Sweden)	Emma Söderberg	1	64:14	1	0	14	0	1	100	0.00
(Switzerland)	Saskia Maurer	1	64:14	0	1	50	1	0	98.0	0.93
(Czech Republic)	Aneta Šenková	2	81:46	1	0	28	1	0	96.4	0.73
(Czech Republic)	Klára Peslarová	1	58:55	0	1	16	1	0	93.8	1.02
(Switzerland)	Chiara Pfosi	1	20:00	0	0	13	1	0	92.3	3.00
(Finland)	Sanni Ahola	2	117:48	1	1	25	2	1	92.0	1.02
(Finland)	Emilia Kyrkkö	1	60:00	0	1	28	4	0	85.7	4.00
(Switzerland)	Andrea Brändli	2	100:00	0	2	60	10	0	83.3	6.00
(Czech Republic)	Daniela Nováková	2	38:14	1	0	8	2	0	75.0	3.14

== 4-Nations Tournament in Czechia ==
The final leg of the 2026–27 season will be a 4-Nations Tournament in Czechia during 5 to 11 April 2027. The host city has yet to be announced.
