= Jenna Pirttijärvi =

Finnish ice hockey player

- Born: 9 March 1994 (age 32) Ranua, Lapland, Finland
- Position: Left wing
- Shoots: Left
- SDHL team Former teams: Skellefteå AIK; Luleå HF/MSSK; RoKi Rovaniemi
- Playing career: 2018–present

Jenna Pirttijärvi (born 9 March 1994) is a Finnish ice hockey player, a winger. She plays in the Swedish Women's Hockey League (SDHL) with Skellefteå AIK.

== Playing career ==
Pirttijärvi began playing ice hockey on the outdoor ice rinks in her home village of Impiö, part of the Ranua municipality in southern Lapland, and she played informal games during childhood, as Ranua didn't have any ice hockey clubs at the time. In her early 20s, she joined a recreational women's ice hockey league in Posio and moved to the recreational league in Rovaniemi two seasons later.

In early 2019, Pirttijärvi sent a message via social media wishing good luck in an upcoming game to RoKi Naiset player Oona Parviainen, the first player from Lapland to represent Finland at the Olympics with the women's national ice hockey team. Parviainen responded to her message with an invitation to train with the team and Pirttijärvi soon joined RoKi Naiset for the 2019 postseason.

She continued with the team in the following season, during which RoKi started in the Naisten Mestis before earning mid-season promotion to the Naisten Liiga (NSML) lower division series (Finnish: alempi jatkosarja) of the 2019–20 season. Pirttijärvi led the team and ranked sixth overall in scoring during the ten-game series, tallying 9 goals and 7 assists for 16 points. In the postseason, RoKi faced potential relegation from the top-tier league in the qualifiers (Finnish: karsintasarja) but, once again, Pirttijärvi took charge and produced 6 goals and 3 assists in four games to secure RoKi's place in the 2020–21 Naisten Liiga season and lead all skaters in scoring.

Ahead of the 2020–21 Naisten Liiga season, she was selected as captain of RoKi Naiset by the team's players. RoKi struggled for wins in the regular season but Pirttijärvi continued to standout as the team's leading scorer, amassing 28 points in thirty games. In the 2021 Naisten Liiga qualification, she contributed 6 goals in six games as RoKi successfully saved themselves from relegation. During the season, she also began practicing with the RoKi boys under-16 team, which played in the second-tier national under-16 league, the U16 Mestis.

Three games in to the 2021–22 Naisten Liiga season, Pirttijärvi and RoKi teammate Aino Karppinen were requested by Luleå HF/MSSK of the Swedish Women's Hockey League (SDHL) as loans to fill-in for roster holes left by injuries and suspensions. Both RoKi players were eager for the opportunity to join the reigning Swedish Champions and debuted in their first SDHL match in late September 2021. At the end of the loan period, Pirttijärvi accepted an extension with Luleå, signing her first professional contract with the team for the remainder of the 2021–22 season. Primarily deployed on the third and fourth lines, she finished the regular season with 5 goals and 9 assists in 29 games. In the playoffs, she notched 2 goals and 2 assists in twelve playoff games, as Luleå claimed their fourth consecutive Swedish Championship title.

She re-signed with Luleå HF/MSSK in June 2022, agreeing to a 2022–23 single-season contract. When her contract was announced, GM Mikael Forsberg highlighted her physical strength, high compete level, and continuous commitment to improving as a hockey player as key assets she brought to the team. Most of the regular season was spent on the third line, generally centred by Wilma Sjölund and playing opposite Linn Peterson on wing during the first half of the season and then deployed with Peterson and Lisa Johansson in January and early February 2023. Pirttijärvi made her debut on Luleå HF/MSSK's top line on 19 February, playing alongside Finnish Olympic medalists Noora Tulus and Viivi Vainikka in the thirtieth game of the 32-game regular season. She settled onto a line centred by Tulus and opposite Finnish Olympic medalist Petra Nieminen for the final two games of the regular season. Continuing to be deployed alongside Tulus and Nieminen in the playoffs, she matched her 4-goal total from the regular season in the first six playoff games and recorded her first multi-point game since October 2021 during the semifinals.

=== National team ===
Pirttijärvi's sudden emergence in the 2019–20 season as an elite scorer in the top Finnish league caught the attention of national team coaches and she was invited to national team training camp in the summer of 2020. The typical career progression of a player being offered a national training camp opportunity began with in the Naisten Liiga or elite junior leagues in their early- to mid-teens, selection to the Finnish national under-18 ice hockey team, and the first invitation to a national team camp would then be extended in their late teens or early twenties; many hopefuls gave up on their national team dreams if no invitation materialized by that time. Pirttijärvi receiving her first invitation at age 26 and after having played only half of a season in the Naisten Liiga was dubbed a "Cinderella story."

She participated in two national team camps during the summer of 2020 and, in combination with playing in the Naisten Liiga, this prompted Pirttijärvi to re-focus her life around ice hockey, with the goal of making the national team. As a result, she reduced her full-time work as a youth counselor by about twenty percent, to allow for more time to travel between her home in Rauna and the rink in Rovaniemi. In March 2021, she was one of thirty players named to the Finnish national team selection camp for the 2021 World Championship, though she was ultimately not selected to the final roster.

After participating in the national team training camp during the summer of 2021, she was selected to the roster for a three-game series of friendlies against Canada in November 2021. She also attended training camps in the summer of 2023, appeared in a friendly against Japan in August 2022, and participated in the first two tournaments of 2022–23 Women's Euro Hockey Tour (EHT). During the Five Nations Tournament in Ängelholm, the second tournament of the 2022–23 EHT, she recorded her first international point, the secondary assist on Krista Parkkonen’s goal against Switzerland on 15 December, and her first national team goal, the sixth goal scored against Sweden on 16 December.

== Career statistics ==
=== Regular season and playoffs ===
			Regular season					Postseason
Season	Team	League	GP	G	A	Pts	PIM	GP	G	A	Pts	PIM
2018-19	RoKi	N Mestis	—	—	—	—	—	5	1	0	1	0
2019-20	RoKi	N Mestis	13	20	13	33	2	—	—	—	—	—
2019-20	RoKi	NSML	10	9	7	16	12	4	6	3	9	8
2020-21	RoKi	NSML	28	14	14	28	22	6	6	1	7	18
2020-21	RoKi U16	U16 Mestis	1	0	0	0	0	—	—	—	—	—
2021-22	RoKi	NSML	3	1	3	4	0	—	—	—	—	—
2021-22	RoKi U16	U16 Mestis	3	1	0	1	0	—	—	—	—	—
2021-22	Luleå HF	SDHL	29	5	4	9	14	12	2	2	4	6
2022-23	Luleå HF	SDHL	32	4	1	5	8	8	7	4	11	4
2023-24	Luleå HF	SDHL	32	10	13	23	4	9	3	4	7	2
Naisten Liiga totals			41	24	24	48	34	10	12	4	16	26
SDHL totals			93	19	18	37	26	29	12	10	22	12
