= RoKi Naiset =

Ice hockey team in Rovaniemi, Finland

Rovaniemen Kiekko Naiset
- City: Rovaniemi, Finland
- League: Naisten Suomi-sarja
- Founded: 2012
- Home arena: Lappi Areena
- Colours: Blue, yellow, white
- Owner: Rovaniemen Kiekko ry
- Head coach: Janne Lappalainen
- Website: Official website

Rovaniemen Kiekko Naiset ('Rovaniemi's Puck Women'), abbreviated RoKi Naiset, are an ice hockey team in the Naisten Suomi-sarja. They play at Lappi Areena in Rovaniemi, the capital city of Finnish Lapland.

RoKi played in the Finnish Championship league, the Auroraliiga (previously called Naisten Liiga), from the 2020–21 season through the 2025–26 season.

== History ==
The team was founded as the women's representative team of the ice hockey club Rovaniemen Kiekko (RoKi) in 2012. RoKi Naiset quickly established themselves as perennially successful competitors in the Naisten Mestis, the second-tier women's ice hockey league in Finland. In December 2019, RoKi earned promotion to the Lower Division (Finnish: Alempi jatkosarja) of the Naisten Liiga, Finland's premier women's ice hockey league.

RoKi first played a full regular season in the Naisten Liiga during the 2020–21 season. They successfully defended their place in the Naisten Liiga/Auroraliiga during the post-season qualification series in 2021, 2022, 2023, and 2025. The team was relegated after being swept in the 2026 Auroraliiga qualification by the Pelicans Lahti. Though RoKi Naiset was relegated from Auroraliiga to the Naisten Mestis, it was determined that the team would merge with the club's team in the Naisten Suomi-sarja, called RoKi Naiset Team, and the combined team would apply for a place in 2026–27 Naisten Suomi-sarja season, instead of the Naisten Mestis. The club stated that the decision was reached via consultation with players from both teams and that player feedback suggested there was insufficient interest in assembling a team at the Mestis level.

== Season-by-season results ==
This is a partial list of recent seasons completed by RoKi Naiset.

Note: Finish = Rank at end of series; GP = Games played, W = Wins (3 points), OTW = Overtime wins (2 points), OTL = Overtime losses (1 point), L = Losses, GF = Goals for, GA = Goals against, Pts = Points, Top scorer: Points (Goals+Assists)

Season	League	Regular season										Postseason results
Season	League	Finish	GP	W	OTW	OTL	L	GF	GA	Pts	Top scorer	Postseason results
2018–19	Naisten Mestis Q	1st Lohko 2	16	14	0	0	2	123	25	42	(Finland) S. Kontiosalo 47 (23+24)	—N/a
2018–19	Naisten Mestis	2nd	10	7	0	0	3	34	17	21	(Finland) I. Lukkarila 13 (5+8)	Not promoted to Naisten Liiga
2019–20	Naisten Mestis Q	1st Lohko 3	12	10	2	0	0	118	28	34	(Finland) E. Jaako 61 (31+30)	—N/a
2019–20	Naisten Mestis XQ	2nd	3	2	0	0	1	10	8	6	(Finland) E. Pekkala 4 (4+0)	—N/a
2019–20	Naisten Liiga	10th	10	3	1	2	4	35	36	13	(Finland) J. Pirttijärvi 16 (9+7)	Promotion/relegation series cancelled due to COVID-19 pandemic
2020–21	Naisten Liiga	9th	29	13	1	1	14	65	103	42	(Finland) J. Pirttijärvi 28 (14+14)	Saved in relegation
2021–22	Naisten Liiga	9th	30	10	1	3	16	89	124	51	(Finland) J. Hietala 41 (29+12)	Saved in relegation
2022–23	Naisten Liiga	10th	36	2	0	4	30	44	193	10	(Czech Republic) A. Kalová 18 (8+10)	Saved in relegation
2023–24	Naisten Liiga	9th	32	2	1	1	28	55	209	9	(Czech Republic) A. Kalová 27 (15+12)	Relegation series cancelled
2024–25	Auroraliiga	9th	32	1	0	1	30	46	200	4	(Czech Republic) D. Malicka 22 (6+16)	Won relegation series versus Lukko, 3–2
2025–26	Auroraliiga	9th	32	0	1	0	31	35	306	2	(Finland) M. Keskisarja 22 (6+16)	Lost relegation series to Pelicans, 0–3
2025–26	Auroraliiga	9th	32	0	1	0	31	35	306	2	(Finland) M. Keskisarja 22 (6+16)	↓ Relegated

== Players and personnel ==
=== 2025–26 roster ===
As of 6 March 2026

No.	Nat	Player	Pos	S/G	Age	Acquired	Birthplace
15	(Finland)	Isla Antikainen	D	–	14–15	2025	
67	(Bulgaria)	Stefani Baykusheva	D	L	20	2026	Sofia, Bulgaria
1	(Canada)	Erica Fryer	G	L	25	2026	Amherstburg, Ontario, Canada
10	(Finland)	Emilia Herranen	F	–	17	2024	
27	(Finland)	Jenna Hietala	F	L	22	2025	Oulainen, Northern Ostrobothnia, Finland
24	(Finland)	Hilpi Hohti (L)	D	–	17	2026	
31	(Finland)	Elli Huotari	G	L	17	2025	
8	(Finland)	Senja Juopperi	D	–	14–15	2025	
68	(Finland)	Erika Karvonen	F	–	27	2025	Kemijärvi, Lapland, Finland
29	(Finland)	Moona Keskisarja	F	L	21	2023	Nivala, North Ostrobothnia, Finland
67	(Finland)	Nia Käyhty	F	L	20	2025	Nurmijärvi, Uusimaa, Finland
7	(Finland)	Aina Lakkapää (A)	D	L	17	2025	
91	(United States)	Sophie Lupone	F	L	24	2026	Suffield, Connecticut, United States
23	(Finland)	Eevi Mantsinen	F	–	14–15	2025	
11	(Finland)	Venla Murto	D	–	16	2025	
14	(Finland)	Rianna Mustonen (C)	D	–	19	2023	Kemijärvi, Lapland, Finland
27	(Finland)	Emma Nikkinen	D	L	17	2024	
18	(United States)	Mae Olshansky	F	R	23	2025	Wilmette, Illinois, United States
3	(Finland)	Heta Paasilinna	D	L	21	2026	
22	(Finland)	Hilla Parviainen	F	L	14–15	2025	
98	(Finland)	Joanna Pohjola (A)	F	–	18	2024	
16	(Finland)	Lara Sainio	F	L	15	2024	
71	(Finland)	Juuli Salo	D	–	15–16	2025	
28	(Finland)	Olivia Saloniemi (A)	D	L	18	2024	
13	(Finland)	Anni Saukkoriipi	F	L	18–19	2025	
30	(Finland)	Alexandra Väyrynen	G	L	27	2023	Sandton, Gauteng, South Africa

Coaching staff and team personnel

- Head coach: Oona Parviainen
- Assistant coach: Ilari Sainio
- Assistant coach: Kalle Tuovila
- Goaltending coach: Antti Ylitalo
- Team manager: Reima Kuusisto
- Equipment managers: Antti Karjalainen, Jasmin Karjalainen & Sari Pipinen

=== Head coaches ===
- Sofia Pohjanen, 2016–2018
- Tuomas Liitola, 2018–2023
- Teemu Kouvula, 2023–24
- Oona Parviainen, March 2024–April 2026
- Janne Lappalainen, April 2026–

=== Team captains ===
- Arja Oja, 2014–2016
- Janina Jatkola, 2016–2019
- Ella Lahtela, 2019–20
- Jenna Pirttijärvi, 2020–21
- Emmi Mourujärvi, 2021–22
- Eveliina Ollila, 2022–2024
- Viivi Iso-Kouvola, 2024–25
- Rianna Mustonen, 2025–

== Notable alumni ==
Years active with RoKi listed alongside player name.

- Sini Karjalainen, 2013–2015
- Aino Karppinen, 2013–2018 & 2020–2022
- Ines Lukkarila, 2015–2019
- Oona Parviainen, 2012–2015 & 2018–2021
- Jenna Pirttijärvi, 2018–2021
- Inna Sirviö, 2014–2019

=== International players ===
- (Czech Republic) Magdaléna Felcmanová, 2021–2025
- (Denmark) Liv Fjordbak Hansen, 2020–2022
- (Sweden) (Finland) Essi Jaako, 2019–2021
- (Czech Republic) Anna Kalová, 2022–2025
- (Australia) (Poland) Olivia Last, 2019–2023
- (Czech Republic) Dominika Malicka, 2024–25
- (Slovakia) Paula Mandelíková, 2021
- (Slovakia) Alexandra Mateičková, 2023–2025
- (United States) Claire Peterson, 2025
- (Czech Republic) Lucie Velinská, 2021–2023
- (Slovakia) Lucia Záborská, 2024–25
- (Poland) Julia Zielińska (L), 2019–20
