= Skellefteå AIK (women) =

SDHL ice hockey team in Skellefteå, Sweden

- City: Skellefteå, Sweden
- League: SDHL
- Founded: 2002
- Operated: 2002–2008; 2017–present
- Home arena: Skellefteå Kraft Arena
- Colours: Black, yellow
- General manager: Ulrika Dahlgren
- Head coach: Martin Lindh
- Captain: Ellen Lövgren
- Parent club: Skellefteå AIK Hockey
- Website: skellefteaaik.se

Skellefteå AIK are an ice hockey team in the Swedish Women's Hockey League (SDHL). They play in Skellefteå, a city on the northeastern coast of Sweden, at the Skellefteå Kraft Arena. The team was first established ahead of the 2002–03 season but was dissolved for financial reasons in 2008. Reestablished in 2017, the present iteration of the team earned promotion to the SDHL in 2024.

== History ==
=== 2002–2008 ===
Skellefteå AIK Hockey first established a representative women's team prior to the 2002–03 season. At that time, no national league for women's ice hockey in Sweden existed and the highest level of competition was regional. Through the regional competitions, teams could qualify for the Swedish Championship in women's ice hockey (Swedish: Svenska mästerskapet i ishockey för damer), a national tournament that was played annually in March.

As a part of the ice hockey association of Västerbotten (Västerbottens Ishockeyförbund), Skellefteå AIK falls under the jurisdiction of the Region Norr (lit. 'North Region'), the regional ice hockey governing body that regulates six of northern Sweden's provincial associations as a subsidiary of the Swedish Ice Hockey Association (SIF). The team began participating in competitions organized by Region Norr in 2002, playing in Group B during the 2002–03 and 2003–04 seasons. They ranked third in Group B at the conclusion of both seasons, finishing behind MoDo HK and BK Ume-Trixa both times.

== Season-by-season results ==
=== 2002–2008 ===
The following table records all seasons completed by the Skellefteå AIK team active during 2002 to 2008.
Note: Finish = Rank at end of regular season; GP = Games played, W = Wins (3 points), OTW = Overtime wins (2 points), OTL = Overtime losses (1 point), L = Losses, GF = Goals for, GA = Goals against, Pts = Points, Top scorer: Points (Goals+Assists)

Season	League	Regular season							Swedish Championship results
Season	League	Finish	GP	W	T	L	GF	GA	Swedish Championship results
2002–03	Group B Norra	3rd	12	7	0	5	50	58	Did not qualify
2003–04	Group B Norra	3rd	12	5	2	5	68	64	Did not qualify
2004–05	Division I Norra	2nd	15	10	0	5	76	71	Lost round-robin quarterfinals (Group B)
2005–06	Division I Norra	2nd	16	11	1	4	69	40	Lost round-robin quarterfinals (Group A)
2006–07	Division I Norra	2nd	16	10	2	4	69	25	Lost quarterfinal match to Segeltorps IF, 2–4
2007–08	Division I Norra	2nd	10	8	0	2	72	13	–
2007–08	Riksserien	7th	14	2	0	12	18	59	Did not qualify

=== 2017–present ===
The following table records all seasons completed by Skellefteå AIK since the team was re-established in 2017.
Note: Finish = Rank at end of regular season; GP = Games played, W = Wins (3 points), OTW = Overtime wins (2 points), OTL = Overtime losses (1 point), L = Losses, GF = Goals for, GA = Goals against, Pts = Points, Top scorer: Points (Goals+Assists)

Season	League	Regular season										Postseason results
Season	League	Finish	GP	W	OTW	OTL	L	GF	GA	Pts	Top scorer	Postseason results
2017–18	Damettan	1st (Norra)	18	11	1	0	6	57	35	35	(Sweden) E. Jönsson 25 (9+16)	Lost PlayOff till SDHL to SDE HF, 0–2
2018–19	Damettan	1st (Norra)	18	13	1	1	3	62	33	42	(Sweden) E. Jönsson 34 (15+19)	Lost PlayOff till SDHL to SDE HF, 0–2
2019–20	Damettan	1st (Norra)	18	14	0	3	1	58	26	45	(Slovakia) J. Hlinka 19 (13+6)	Lost Play Off till SDHL to MODO, 0–2
2020–21	Damettan	1st	4	3	0	0	1	10	4	9	(Slovakia) J. Hlinka 6 (1+5)	Postseason cancelled due to COVID-19 pandemic
2021–22	NDHL DamEttan	1st (Norra)	17	8	5	1	3	44	24	35	(Czech Republic) L. Lerchová 20 (13+7)	
2021–22	Dam Hockey-Allsvenskan	1st (Norra)	6	6	0	0	0	24	3	18	(Sweden) E. Jaako 11 (5+6)	Lost Play Off till SDHL to Göteborg HC, 2–1
2022–23	NDHL DamEttan	1st (Norra)	24	22	2	0	0	123	11	70	(Czech Republic) L. Lerchová 33 (18+15)	
2022–23	Dam Hockey-Allsvenskan	3rd (Norra)	6	4	0	0	0	13	10	12	(Canada) H. Reuther 6 (2+4)	Lost round-robin Kvalserien till SDHL
2023–24	NDHL DamEttan	1st (Norra)	16	14	1	0	1	89	11	44	(United States) S. Krauseneck 21 (12+9)	
2023–24	Dam Hockey-Allsvenskan	1st (Norra)	12	12	0	0	0	45	6	36	(Denmark) N. Söndergaard Jensen 10 (6+4)	Won Play Off till SDHL versus AIK, 2–0
2023–24	Dam Hockey-Allsvenskan	1st (Norra)	12	12	0	0	0	45	6	36	(Denmark) N. Söndergaard Jensen 10 (6+4)	Promoted to SDHL

== Players and personnel ==
=== 2024–25 roster ===
As of 5 November 2024

No.	Nat	Player	Pos	S/G	Age	Acquired	Birthplace
88	(Sweden)	Malou Berggren (C)	D	L	23	2022	Skellefteå, Västerbotten, Sweden
15	(Denmark)	Nikita Bergmann	F	L	17	2024	
18	(Sweden)	Sara Bjurvén	F	L	23	2022	Lidingö, Uppland, Sweden
1	(Sweden)	Miranda Dahlgren	G	L	25	2017	Skellefteå, Västerbotten, Sweden
35	(Canada)	Camryn Drever	G	R	25	2024	Edmonton, Alberta, Canada
23	(Sweden)	Leia Eriksson	D	L	18	2022	
9	(Sweden)	Pernilla Forsgren	D	L	26	2023	Umeå, Västerbotten, Sweden
14	(Sweden)	Line Grahn	F	L	26	2018	Åsele, Lapland, Sweden
16	(Sweden)	Vilma Granlund	F	L	28	2017	
2	(Sweden)	Rebecca Hollström	D	L	19	2023	Skellefteå, Västerbotten, Sweden
8	(Sweden)	Tyra Håkansson	F	R	18	2021	
12	(Sweden)	Liv Jonsson	D	L	20	2020	Skellefteå, Västerbotten, Sweden
22	(Finland)	Sini Karjalainen	D	L	27	2024	Posio, Lapland, Finland
43	(Finland)	Aino Karppinen	D	L	27	2024	Rovaniemi, Lapland, Finland
26	(Finland)	Ida Kuoppala	F	L	25	2024	Pietarsaari, Ostrobothnia, Finland
25	(United States)	Mikayla Lantto	F	R	25	2024	Palmer, Alaska, United States
17	(Czech Republic)	Laura Lerchová	F	L	25	2020	Třinec, Ostrava Region, Czechia
10	(Sweden)	Ellen Lövgren (A)	F	R	26	2019	Kåge, Västerbotten, Sweden
7	(Sweden)	Ronja Mogren	F	R	24	2023	Husum, Ångermanland, Sweden
19	(Finland)	Jenna Pirttijärvi	F	L	31	2024	Ranua, Lapland, Finland
3	(Canada)	Isabella Pozzi	D	R	26	2024	Calgary, Alberta, Canada
28	(Denmark)	Nicoline Söndergaard Jensen (A)	F	L	33	2024	Tårnby, Capital Region, Denmark
30	(Czech Republic)	Blanka Škodová	G	L	28	2024	Šternberk, Olomouc Region, Czechia
4	(Sweden)	Moa Viklund	D	L	29	2021	Lycksele, Lapland, Sweden
11	(Canada)	Marah Wagner	F	L	25	2024	Langley, British Columbia, Canada

Coaching staff and team personnel

- Head coach: Martin Lindh
- Assistant coach: Mikkel Ry Nielsen
- Goaltending coach: Mikael Strömberg

=== Team captaincy history ===
- Line Grahn, 2019–2022
- Clara Markeby, 2022–23
- Ellen Lövgren, 2023–24
- Malou Berggren, 2024–

=== Head coaches ===
- Magnus Wahlberg, c. 2007–08
- Magnus Lundin, 2019–20
- Kajsa Östlund, 2020–2022
- Claes Lindholm, 2022–23
- Tuomas Liitola, 2023–24
- Martin Lindh, 2024–present

== Notable alumni ==
Years active with Skellefteå AIK listed alongside player name.

- (Sweden) Johanna Fällman, 2006–2008
- (Slovakia) (United States) Janka Hlinka, 2019–2021
- (Slovakia) Tatiana Ištocyová, 2020–21
- (Hungary) Kinga Jókai Szilágyi, 2023–24
- (Slovakia) Romana Košecká, 2020–21
- (Sweden) Kristina Lundberg, 2006–2008
- (Canada) Tyra Meropoulis, 2022–23
- (Canada) Holly Reuther, 2022–23
- (Norway) Henriette Sletbak, 2017–2019
