= Lukko Naiset =

Naisten Mestis ice hockey team in Rauma, Finland

- City: Rauma, Finland
- League: Naisten Mestis
- Founded: 2011
- Operated: 2011–2023; 2024–present
- Home arena: Eurajoen jäähalli
- Colours: Blue, yellow
- Head coach: Tuomas Liitola (2026–27)
- Captain: Jasmin Laaksonen (2025–26)
- Media: Satakunnan Kansa
- Affiliates: Panelian Raikas
- Parent club: Rauman Lukko ry
- Website: Official website

Franchise history
- 2011–2023: Lukko
- 2024–2025: Lukko/PaRa
- 2025–: Lukko

Current uniform
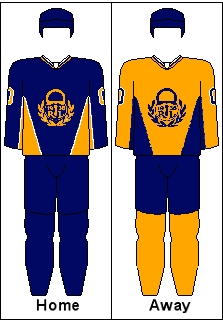

Rauman Lukko Naiset (lit. 'Rauma's Lock Women') is an ice hockey team in the Naisten Mestis. The team is based in Rauma, a port city on the southwestern coast of Finland, and its home arena is the Eurajoen jäähalli in the neighboring town of Eurajoki. Lukko Naiset was founded in 2011 as the representative women's ice hockey team of Rauman Lukko ry, an association for ice hockey and ringette that serves as a recreational and minor ice hockey affiliate to the professional men's ice hockey club Lukko.

== History ==
=== Original team, 2011–2023 ===
Lukko made their team debut in the pre-qualifiers Finnish: alkusarja) of the third-tier national league, the Naisten Suomi-sarja, at the start of the 2011–12 season. After winning all eight of their matches in the qualifiers, they earned promotion to the I-divisioona (renamed Naisten Mestis in 2012) and went on to play the remainder of the season in the second-tier league.

promotion to the Naisten Liiga (NSML; renamed Auroraliiga in 2024) for the 2016–17 season and remained in the Liiga until being relegated at the conclusion of the 2020–21 season. They achieved promotion in the 2021–22 NSML qualification series and returned to the league after one season in the Naisten Mestis.

The team faced relegation four times in their first five seasons in the Naisten Liiga but were able to save themselves in the qualification series each time, until finally being relegated in the 2020–21 season.

After starting the 2021–22 season in the Naisten Mestis, Lukko earned placement in the Alempi jatkosarja ('Lower division') of the 2021–22 Naisten Liiga season. In the 2022 post-season qualification series, they successfully saved themselves from relegation and maintained their place in the Naisten Liiga in the following season.

In April 2023, Lukko Naiset unexpectedly withdrew from the Naisten Liiga and the team was dissolved. Rauman Lukko ry cited difficulties in recruiting and retaining players as the principal reasons behind the decision. Team captain Maija Koski was shocked both by the disolution of the team and that no players had been consulted prior to the announcement. She felt that the team could have been saved if avenues of communication had been opened between the association and the players. Some observers raised questions about the club's commitment to and willingness to invest in women's ice hockey and noted the conspicuous absence of support from the men's Liiga team and organization.

=== Reestablishment, since 2024 ===
In May 2024, Lukko announced it had entered a cooperative agreement with Panelian Raikas (PaRa), an ice hockey club in neighboring Panelia, which would serve as the basis of a new strategy for supporting and developing girls' and women's ice hockey in Satakunta. The strategy included the immediate re-establishment of the Lukko women's team and the team's participation in the 2024–25 Naisten Mestis season through the acquisition of PaRa's league license. A core element of the strategy was the goal of having a Satakunta-based team at every level of national women's ice hockey competition within three season, i.e. Lukko gaining promotion to Auroraliiga, PaRa gaining promotion to Naisten Mestis, and an umbrella club participating in the Naisten Suomi-sarja. Lukko was also known as Lukko/PaRa during the 2024–25 season and, in a corresponding move, PaRa's women's team in the Naisten Suomi-sarja was renamed PaRa/Lukko for the 2024–25 Naisten Suomi-sarja season.

Under head coach Jere Auvinen, Lukko/PaRa placed fourth of eight teams in the 2024–25 Naisten Mestis regular season, winning sixteen of 28 games and earning a goal difference of +26. The team was propelled by offensive production from both the top line of Pinja Koskinen (17 goals+13 assists), Charlotta Lundström (17+11), and Jenna Pelkonen (9+12) and the top defensive pair of Ada Ukkola (4+11) and Janica Laine (8+6), as well as excellent goaltending from the tandem of Netta-Sisko Lahtinen (.962 S%) and Katriina Saarenmaa (.908 S%).

In the 2025 Naisten Mestis playoffs, Lukko/PaRa swept KeuPa HT in the quarterfinals and beat Kiekko-Espoo Akatemia in the semifinals on their way to claiming the Naisten Mestis championship in a finals sweep over APV. By winning the Naisten Mestis championship title, Lukko earned the chance to vie for promotion to the Auroraliiga in a best-of-five qualification series against RoKi, the lowest ranked team in the Auroraliiga regular season. The series was pushed to overtime in game five but, ultimately, RoKi secured the victory and retained their place in Auroraliiga, leaving Lukko/PaRa to return to the Naisten Mestis.

Lukko improved to a second place finish in the 2025–26 Naisten Mestis regular season, earning twenty wins across 28 games and amassing a goal difference of +46. For the second consecutive season, Pinja Koskinen was the team leader in points and goals, with 35 points and 29 goals in 28 games. Three other players exceeded the twenty-point mark on the season: Roosa-Maria Kangasniemi (6+23), Charlotta Lundström (18+10), and Jenna Pelkonen (6+15). Netta-Sisko Lahtinen continued to post excellent goaltending statistics, ranking second in the league for save percentage with .945 S% in 1,570 minutes on ice.

Rauman Lukko ry published an updated women's ice hockey strategy in April 2026. The strategy outlined milestones and announced the hiring of a full-time coach. The club also committed to covering all expenses for Lukko Naiset players.

== Season-by-season results ==
This is a partial list of the most recent seasons completed by Lukko, called Lukko/PaRa during the 2024–25 season.
Note: Finish = Rank at end of series; GP = Games played, W = Wins (3 points), OTW = Overtime wins (2 points), OTL = Overtime losses (1 point), L = Losses, GF = Goals for, GA = Goals against, Pts = Points, Top scorer: Points (Goals+Assists)

Season	League	Regular season										Postseason results
Season	League	Finish	GP	W	OTW	OTL	L	GF	GA	Pts	Top scorer	Postseason results
2018–19	Naisten Liiga	9th	30	8	2	0	20	76	149	28	(Finland) E. Ylitalo 26 (12+14)	Saved in relegation
2019–20	Naisten Liiga	9th	30	5	2	1	22	57	128	20	(Finland) E. Varpula 21 (12+9)	Relegation series cancelled due to COVID-19 pandemic
2020–21	Naisten Liiga	10th	27	4	0	0	23	47	145	12	(Finland) M. Koski 20 (13+7)	Relegated to Naisten Mestis
2021–22	Naisten Mestis Q	2nd (Note: 1st in Lohko 2 (2.75 points per game))	12	11	0	0	1	84	18	33	(Finland) M. Koski 36 (18+18)	Promoted to Naisten Liiga lower division series
2021–22	Naisten Liiga	10th	10	4	0	0	6	19	32	12	(Finland) R-M. Kangasniemi 7 (2+5)	Saved in relegation
2022–23	Naisten Liiga	9th	36	1	4	1	30	59	227	12	(Finland) A. Toivonen 24 (12+12)	Saved in relegation
2023–24	—N/a											
2024–25	Naisten Mestis	4th	28	14	2	3	9	93	67	49	(Finland) P. Koskinen 30 (17+13)	Won N. Mestis championship versus APV, 2–0
2024–25	Naisten Mestis	4th	28	14	2	3	9	93	67	49	(Finland) P. Koskinen 30 (17+13)	Lost Auroraliiga qualification series to RoKi, 3–2
2025–26	Naisten Mestis	2nd	28	19	1	1	7	100	54	60	(Finland) P. Koskinen 35 (29+6)	N. Mestis championship runner-up versus Pelicans, 1–2

== Players and personnel ==
=== Team captaincy history ===
- Annika Järvinen, 2014–2016
- Tiia Koskinen, 2016–2018
- Elviira Ylitalo, 2018–19
- Maija Koski, 2019–2023
- Janica Laine, 2024–25
- Karoliina Lindroth, 2025–January 2026 (Note: Replaced in January after sustaining a season-ending injury.)
- Jasmin Laaksonen, January 2026–

=== Head coaches ===
- Toni Tunturivuori, 2014–15
- Hannu Roos, 2016–2018
- Marko Toivonen, 2018–24 November 2020
- Sami Piilikangas, 24 November 2020–2023
- Jere Auvinen, 2024–2026
- Tuomas Liitola, 2026–

== Notable alumni ==
Years active with Lukko listed alongside player name.

- Reetu Kulhua, 2011–2016
- Erika Kytömaa, 2013–2018 & 2019–2021
- Janica Laine, 2013–2018
- Maija Otamo, 2011–2014
- Sanna Sainio, 2011–12
- Eveliina Suonpää, 2016–2018
- Susanna Tapani, 2016–2018
- Aliisa Toivonen, 2015–2023
- Elviira Ylitalo, 2012–2016 & 2017–2019

=== International players ===
- (Canada) Andrea Bevan, 2012–13
- (Iceland) Gudrun Vidarsdóttir, 2012–13
- (Austria) Ana Kahlhammer, 2020–2022
- (Canada) Cheyann Newman, 2013–14
- (United States) Shelley Payne, 2019–20
- (Latvia) Sabīne Kate Rubīna, 2025–26
- (Israel) (Russia) Lyubov Tokar, 2020–21
- (Latvia) Anna Trupāne, 2025–26
