= Panelian Raikas =

Ice hockey club in Eura, Finland

- Traditional logo Centennial logo
- City: Eura, Finland
- League: III-divisioona (men); Naisten Suomi-sarja (women)
- Founded: 8 January 1920; 106 years ago
- Home arena: Panelian jäähalli
- Colours: Blue, orange, black
- Head coach: Harri Jalonen (men); Jere Auvinen (women)
- Captain: Jonne Koivumäki (women); Sini Maansalo (women)
- Affiliate: Lukko/PaRa
- Website: panelianraikas.fi

Panelian Raikas, abbreviated PaRa, is an ice hockey club in the Panelia area of Eura municipality in Finland. PaRa was established in 1920 as an athletics club but, as of 2024, it exclusively operates departments in ice hockey. The club's home venue is Panelian jäähalli (lit. 'Panelia's ice hall').

The PaRa men's representative team competes in the III-divisioona, the fifth-tier men's national ice hockey league in Finland. At its peak during the 1950s and 1960s, the team competed in the third-tier Maakuntasarja (replaced by 2. Divisioona in 1975, which was itself replaced by the Suomi-sarja in 1999).

PaRa has an agreement with the minor affiliate club of Lukko, through which it co-operates two women's teams in the Finnish national leagues. The club's representative women's team, PaRa/Lukko, plays in the third-tier Naisten Suomi-sarja. Lukko's representative women's team, Lukko/PaRa, plays in the second-tier Naisten Mestis.
