= Janka Hlinka =

Slovak-American ice hockey player

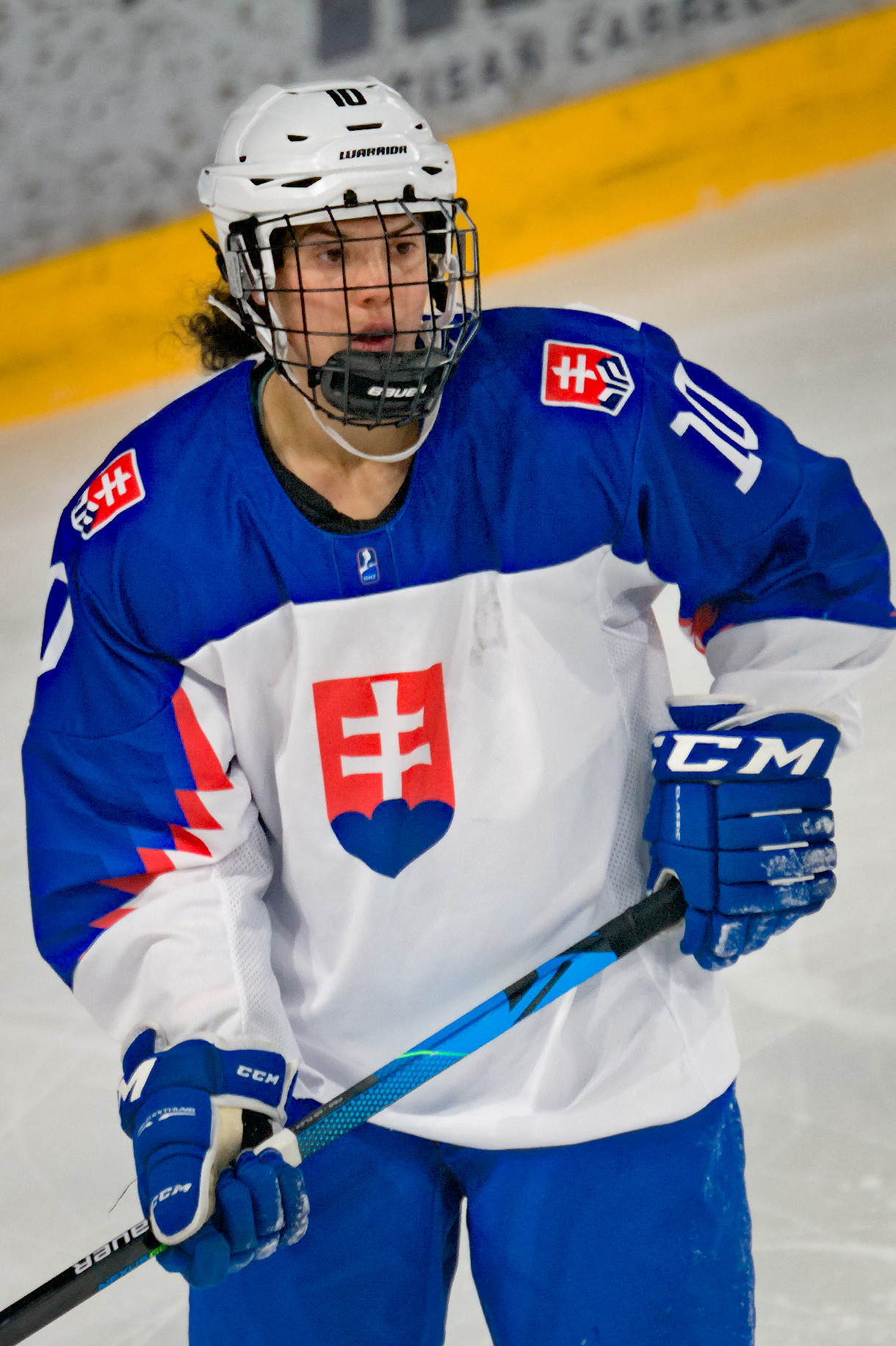
- Hlinka representing Slovakia at the 2022 IIHF World Championship Division 1A
- Born: 31 October 1995 (age 30) Stratford, Connecticut, US
- Height: 1.71 m (5 ft 7 in)
- Weight: 73 kg (161 lb; 11 st 7 lb)
- Position: Forward
- Shoots: Left
- EWHL team Former teams: ŠKP Bratislava: Connecticut Whale; Skellefteå AIK; ŠKP Bratislava U16; Middlebury Panthers
- Coached for: Manhattanville College Valiants
- National team: Slovakia
- Playing career: 2014–present
- Coaching career: 2022–present

Janka Hlinka or Janka Hlinková (born 31 October 1995) is a Slovak-American ice hockey forward and member of the Slovak national team, currently playing in the European Women's Hockey League (EWHL) with ŠKP Bratislava. She previously played in the Premier Hockey Federation (PHF) with the Connecticut Whale. Her college ice hockey career was played at Middlebury College, where she won three New England Small College Athletic Conference championships.

== Playing career ==
As a player with the Middlebury Panthers women's ice hockey program, Hlinka recorded 20 goals and 45 assists for a total of 65 points in 113 career NCAA Division III games. She and future Whale teammate Emily Fluke were Panther teammates for one season.

Hlinka relocated to Europe after graduating from college. During the 2018–19 campaign, she suited up for ŠKP Bratislava U16 in the Liga kadetov, the top under-16 (U16) boys' league in Slovakia, posting 12 goals and 11 assists in 21 games. She then spent two seasons with Skellefteå AIK in the Swedish Damettan, where she led the team in scoring both seasons. She tallied 25 points (14+11) in 21 games over the span.

Hlinka played in 16 regular season games with the Connecticut Whale and two playoff games of the 2021–22 PHF season, including the Whale's first appearance in the Isobel Cup.

=== International play ===
Hlinka represented Slovakia in the Division I Group A tournaments of the IIHF Women's World Championship in 2019, 2022, and 2023. She led the team in goals at the 2019 tournament, notching two across five games played.

She ranked second in scoring of all tournament skaters at the 2024 IIHF Women's World Championship Division I Group B, with 3 goals and 5 assists for 8 points in five games. Her performance was recognized with selection as the best forward of the tournament by the tournament directorate and as best player for Slovakia by the coaches.

== Career statistics ==
=== Regular season and playoffs ===
			Regular season					Playoffs
Season	Team	League	GP	G	A	Pts	PIM	GP	G	A	Pts	PIM
2014–15	Middlebury Panthers	NCAA D3	23	4	12	16	26	—	—	—	—	—
2015–16	Middlebury Panthers	NCAA D3	30	4	8	12	20	—	—	—	—	—
2016–17	Middlebury Panthers	NCAA D3	27	8	12	20	22	—	—	—	—	—
2017–18	Middlebury Panthers	NCAA D3	28	4	12	16	20	—	—	—	—	—
2018–19	ŠKP Bratislava U16	Liga kadetov	21	12	11	23	14	—	—	—	—	—
2019–20	Skellefteå AIK	Damettan	15	13	6	19	24	1	0	0	0	2
2020–21	Skellefteå AIK	Damettan	4	1	5	6	4	—	—	—	—	—
2021–22	Connecticut Whale	PHF	16	1	1	2	2	2	0	0	0	0
2022–23	Connecticut Whale	PHF	23	1	2	3	4	3	0	0	0	0
2023–24	ŠKP Bratislava	EWHL	21	12	6	18	20
NCAA totals			113	20	45	65	88	–	–	–	–	–
Damettan totals			19	14	11	25	28	–	–	–	–	–
PHF totals			39	2	3	5	6	5	0	0	0	0

Note: Postseason statistics from the 2019–20 Damettan season are from the qualification series and are not included in playoff totals.

=== International ===
Year	Team	Event	Result	GP	G	A	Pts	PIM
2019	Slovakia	WC D1A	5th	5	2	0	2	8
2021	Slovakia	OGQ	DNQ	3	0	1	1	6
2022	Slovakia	WC D1A	3rd	4	0	1	1	4
2023	Slovakia	WC D1A	6th	5	0	0	0	4
2024	Slovakia	WC D1B	1st	5	3	5	8	0
				19	5	6	11	16
