= Marah Wagner =

American ice hockey player (born 2000)

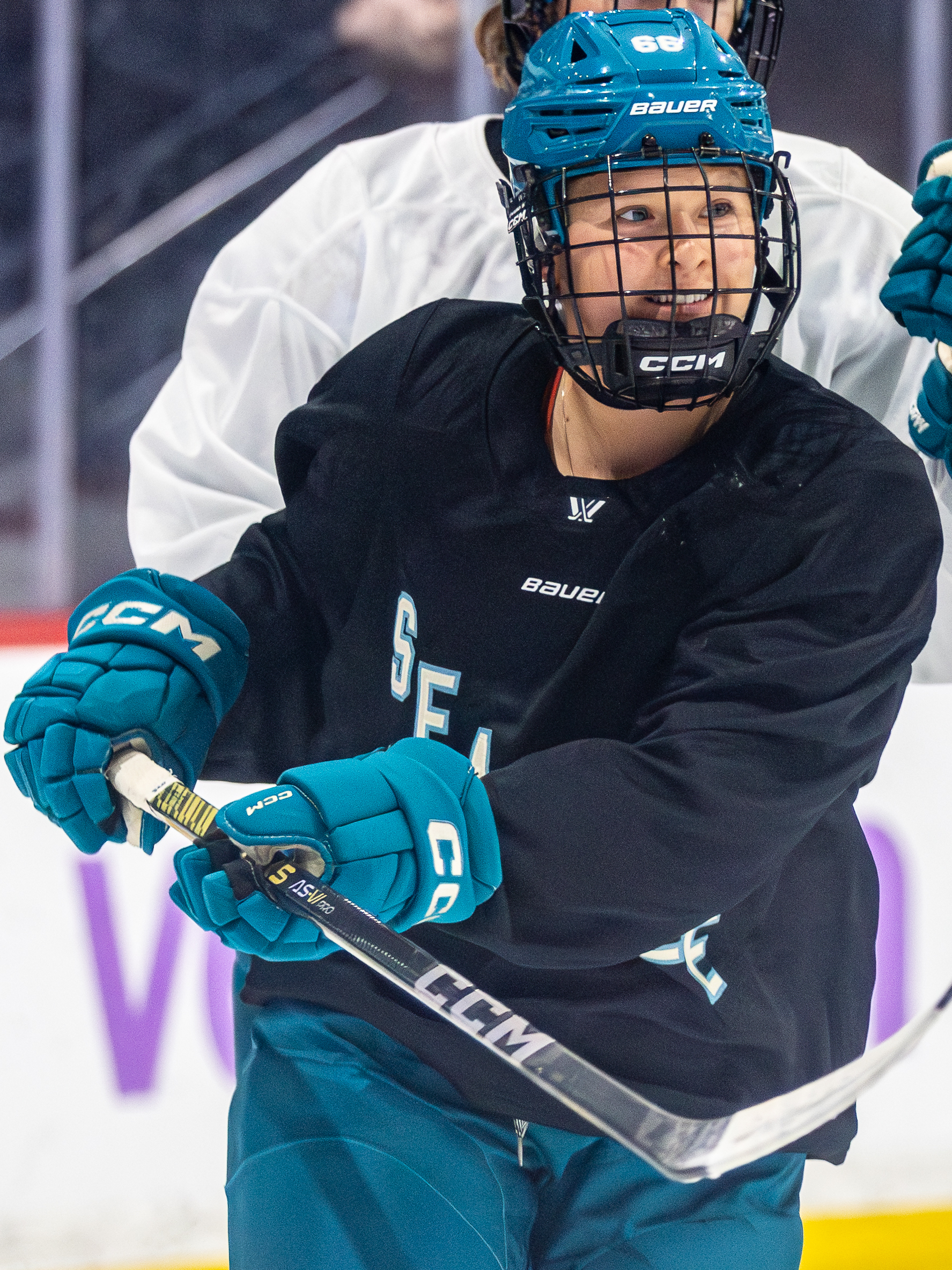
- Wagner with the Seattle Torrent in 2025
- Born: October 19, 2000 (age 25) Seattle, Washington, U.S.
- Height: 5 ft 5 in (165 cm)
- Position: Forward
- Shoots: Left
- PWHL team Former teams: Seattle Torrent; Skellefteå AIK
- Playing career: 2019–present

Marah Wagner (born October 19, 2000) is a Canadian-American professional ice hockey player for the Seattle Torrent of the Professional Women's Hockey League (PWHL). She previously played for Skellefteå AIK of the Swedish Women's Hockey League (SDHL). She played college ice hockey at Robert Morris and RPI.

== Early life ==
Wagner was born to Shammah and Robyn Wagner in Seattle, Washington. She has an older brother Aiden, and a twin brother, Nicholas. She was born to Canadian parents and raised in Woodinville, Washington. As a youth player in the Pacific Northwest, Wagner played on boys' travel teams, including the Seattle Juniors and Sno-King, due to limited girls' hockey options in the area at the time. She was home-schooled until moving to British Columbia to attend Delta Hockey Academy in tenth grade at age 16 to play girls' high school hockey. She played her final two pre-collegiate seasons with the North American Hockey Academy in Vermont, recording 59 goals and 45 assists in 131 games. She won the regular season championship in both years with NAHA.

== Playing career ==
=== College ===
Wagner began her collegiate career for Robert Morris during the 2019–20 season. During her freshman year, she recorded one goal and four assists in 36 games, in a season that was shortened due to the COVID-19 pandemic. During the 2020–21 season, in her sophomore year, she recorded seven goals and three assists in 25 games, in a season that was shortened due to the COVID-19 pandemic. The Colonials won the 2021 College Hockey America (CHA) Tournament, defeating RIT, Mercyhurst, and Syracuse to earn the program's third CHA title and an automatic bid to the 2021 NCAA National Collegiate Women's Ice Hockey Tournament. As the eighth seed in the NCAA Tournament, Robert Morris fell to top-seeded Northeastern 5–1 in the quarterfinals.

Following her sophomore year, Wagner transferred to Rensselaer Polytechnic Institute. During the 2021–22 season, in her junior year, she led the team in scoring and recorded 11 goals and ten assists in 32 games. She ranked first on the team in shots on goal (93) and third in blocked shots (52). She was named an assistant captain for the 2021–22 season and earned ECAC Hockey All-Academic honors. On September 14, 2022, she was named co-captain for the 2022–23 season. During her senior year she recorded four goals and 13 assists in 34 games. She ranked first on the team in assists and shots on goal (103), and second in points (17). On September 21, 2023, she was again named co-captain for the 2023–24 season. As a graduate student, she recorded six goals and 15 assists in 35 games.

=== Professional ===
==== Skellefteå AIK (2024–25) ====
On August 3, 2024, Wagner signed with Skellefteå AIK of the SDHL. Skellefteå AIK earned promotion to the SDHL for the 2024–25 season after seven years in the lower division. During the 2024–25 season, she recorded five goals and nine assists in 32 games during the regular season. The team finished fifth in the ten-team league and advanced to the playoffs, where Wagner recorded two goals in three playoff games.

==== Seattle Torrent (2025–present) ====
In October 2025, she was invited to the Seattle Torrent's training camp. On November 20, 2025, she signed a one-year contract with the Torrent. Wagner made history as the PWHL's first player from the state of Washington. On November 28, 2025, she played in the Torrent's inaugural home opener at Climate Pledge Arena, which set a United States attendance record for a women's professional hockey game with 16,014 fans. The Seattle native received a thunderous ovation during player introductions at the historic game.

== Career statistics ==
| | | | Regular season | | | | | Playoffs |
| Season | Team | League | GP | G | A | Pts | PIM | GP | G | A | Pts | PIM |
|---|---|---|---|---|---|---|---|---|---|---|---|---|
| 2019–20 | Robert Morris University | CHA | 36 | 1 | 4 | 5 | 10 | — | — | — | — | — |
| 2020–21 | Robert Morris University | CHA | 25 | 7 | 3 | 10 | 6 | — | — | — | — | — |
| 2021–22 | RPI | ECAC | 32 | 11 | 10 | 21 | 14 | — | — | — | — | — |
| 2022–23 | RPI | ECAC | 34 | 4 | 13 | 17 | 12 | — | — | — | — | — |
| 2023–24 | RPI | ECAC | 35 | 6 | 15 | 21 | 9 | — | — | — | — | — |
| 2024–25 | Skellefteå AIK | SDHL | 32 | 5 | 9 | 14 | 16 | 3 | 2 | 0 | 2 | 4 |
| 2025–26 | Seattle Torrent | PWHL | 20 | 0 | 0 | 0 | 2 | — | — | — | — | — |
| SDHL totals | | | 32 | 5 | 9 | 14 | 16 | 3 | 2 | 0 | 2 | 4 |
| PWHL totals | | | 20 | 0 | 0 | 0 | 2 | — | — | — | — | — |
