= Celina Haider =

German ice hockey player (born 2000)

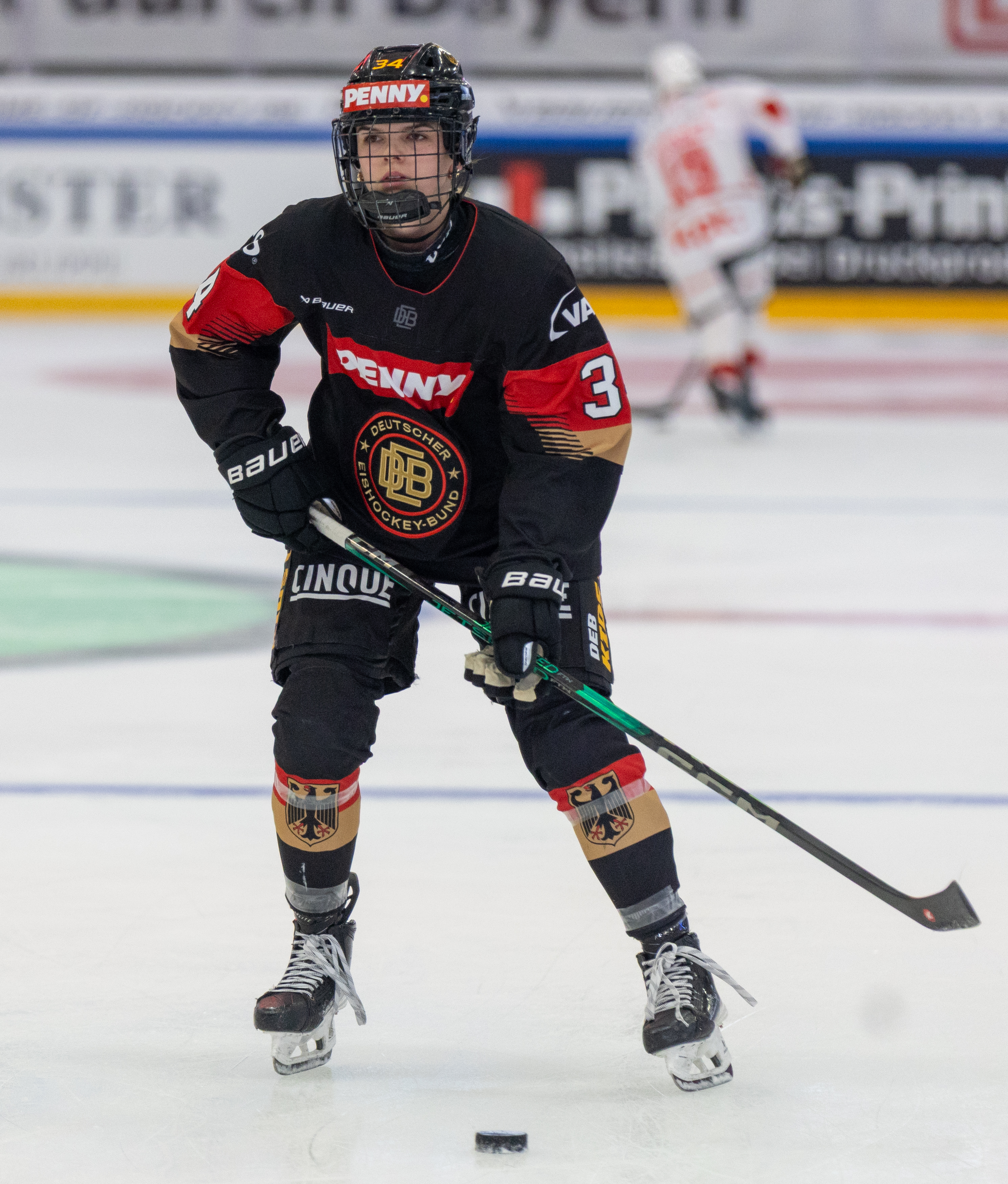
- Born: 20 July 2000 (age 25) Rosenheim, Germany
- Height: 1.70 m (5 ft 7 in)
- Weight: 65 kg (143 lb; 10 st 3 lb)
- Position: Forward
- Shoots: Left
- DFEL team Former teams: ERC Ingolstadt; ECDC Memmingen; ESC Planegg
- National team: Germany
- Playing career: 2016–present

Celina Haider (born 20 July 2000) is a German ice hockey player and member of the German national team, currently playing in the German Women's Ice Hockey League (DFEL) with ERC Ingolstadt.

She represented Germany at the IIHF Women's World Championship in 2019 and 2022.
