= BK Ume-Trixa =

Sports club in Umeå, Sweden

- Full name: Bandyklubben Ume-Trixa
- Sport: ice hockey bandy, rink bandy (earlier)
- Founded: 1981
- Based in: Umeå, Sweden
- Arena: Umeå Arena

BK Ume-Trixa is a sports club in Umeå, Sweden, established in 1981. The club earlier played rink bandy and bandy, but now instead runs women's ice hockey. The women's bandy team played seven seasons in the Swedish top division.
