= Aino Karppinen =

Finnish ice hockey player

- Born: 7 August 1998 (age 28) Rovaniemi, Finland
- Height: 1.68 m (5 ft 6 in)
- Weight: 68 kg (150 lb; 10 st 10 lb)
- Position: Defense
- Shoots: Left
- SDHL team Former teams: Skellefteå AIK: Leksands IF; AIK Hockey; Luleå HF/MSSK (L); RoKi Rovaniemi; Kärpät Oulu
- National team: Finland
- Playing career: 2013–present
Medal record
World Championship
Bronze medal – third place	2021 Canada

Aino Karppinen (born 7 August 1997) is a Finnish ice hockey player and member of the Finnish national team. She plays in the Swedish Women's Hockey League (SDHL) with Skellefteå AIK.

== Playing career ==
Karppinen developed in the youth department of Rovaniemen Kiekko (RoKi), an ice hockey club in her hometown of Rovaniemi. She debuted at the women's senior level with RoKi Naiset in the 2013–14 season of the Naisten Mestis, during which she played a total of six matches. Over the following seasons, she variously played with RoKi Naiset and the RoKi under-16 and under-18 men's teams. During the 2016–17 Naisten Mestis season, Karppinen served as RoKi Naiset's alternate captain.

In the 2018–19 season, she moved to Oulu to play with Kärpät Naiset of the Naisten Liiga. With Kärpät, she won Finnish Championship bronze in 2019 and the team qualified for the 2020 bronze medal game before the playoffs were cancelled due to the COVID-19 pandemic.

After RoKi Naiset gained promotion to the Naisten Liiga at the conclusion of the 2019–20 season, Karppinen returned to her home club for the 2020–21 Naisten Liiga season. In addition to playing with RoKi Naiset, she also played 21 games with the RoKi U18 men's team in the 2020–21 U18 Mestis season.

== International play ==
Karppinen was a member of the Finnish national under-18 ice hockey team during the 2015–16 international season, which culminated with her participation in the 2016 IIHF World Women's U18 Championship. At the World U18 Championship, Karppinen was Finland's highest scoring defenseman, recording three points (1+2) in five games.

At the senior level, Karppinen has appeared with the Finnish national team at various tournaments in the 2018–19 and 2019–20 international seasons, including three of the four tournaments comprising the 2019–20 Women's Euro Hockey Tour. She participated in the national team training camp in preparation for the 2020 IIHF World Women's Championship but was not selected to the final roster. The 2021 IIHF Women's World Championship was her World Championship debut. She was the first Rovaniemi-born product of the RoKi youth system and third woman from Finnish Lapland to be selected to the Finnish national team.

== Career statistics ==
=== Regular season and playoffs ===
			Regular season					Playoffs
Season	Team	League	GP	G	A	Pts	PIM	GP	G	A	Pts	PIM
2013–14	RoKi	N. Mestis	6	0	0	0	0	9	0	3	3	4
2014–15	RoKi	N. Mestis	2	0	0	0	2	–	–	–	–	–
2014–15	RoKi U16	U16 Suomi-sarja	17	3	5	8	8	–	–	–	–	–
2015–16	RoKi	N. Suomi-sarja	2	1	3	4	6	–	–	–	–	–
2015–16	RoKi	U16 Mestis	26	1	5	6	2	–	–	–	–	–
2016–17	RoKi	N. Mestis	29	17	28	45	30	–	–	–	–	–
2017–18	RoKi	N. Mestis	23	25	22	47	16	–	–	–	–	–
2017–18	RoKi U18	U18 Mestis	21	0	1	1	D	–	–	–	–	–
2018–19	Kärpät	NSML	29	6	6	12	24	7	0	0	0	12
2019–20	Kärpät	NSML	30	3	12	15	30	8	0	1	1	4
2020–21	RoKi	NSML	16	4	5	9	2	–	–	–	–	–
2020–21	RoKi U18	U18 Mestis	21	1	1	2	6	–	–	–	–	–
2021–22	RoKi U16	U16 Mestis	5	1	10	11	0	2	1	2	3	0
2021–22	RoKi U16	U16 SM-sarja	8	0	2	2	2	–	–	–	–	–
2021–22	RoKi U18	U18 Mestis	1	0	0	0	0	–	–	–	–	–
2021–22	Luleå (L)	SDHL	9	1	3	4	0	–	–	–	–	–
2021–22	RoKi	NSML	6	2	2	4	14	–	–	–	–	–
2022–23	Brynäs IF	SDHL	32	5	6	11	22	4	1	4	5	0
2023–24	Leksands IF	SDHL	36	5	6	11	6	3	0	0	0	2
U18 Mestis totals			43	1	2	3	12	–	–	–	–	–
Naisten Liiga totals			82	15	27	42	70	15	0	1	1	16
SDHL totals			77	11	15	26	28	3	0	0	0	2

=== International ===
Year	Team	Event	Result	GP	G	A	Pts	PIM
2016	Finland	WC18	6th	5	1	2	3	2
2021	Finland	WC	3rd place, bronze medalist(s)	2	0	0	0	0
2022	Finland	WC	6th	0	–	–	–	–
Senior totals				2	0	0	0	0
