= Reica Staiger =

Japanese-Swiss ice hockey player and on-ice official

Personal information
- Citizenship: Switzerland, Japan
- Born: 8 November 1996 (age 29) Zürich, Switzerland
- Occupation: On-ice official
- Employers: SIHF; IIHF
Ice hockey career
- Height: 1.63 m (5 ft 4 in)
- Weight: 62.2 kg (137 lb; 9 st 11 lb)
- Position: Defense
- Shot: Right
- Played for: ZSC Lions; EHC Winterthur
- National team: Switzerland
- Playing career: 2009–2020

Reica Rose Staiger (born 8 November 1996) is a Japanese-Swiss ice hockey official and retired ice hockey player. She is a former member of the Swiss national team and a five-time Swiss Women's Hockey League A (SWHL A) champion.

== Playing career ==
Staiger first played in a senior women's ice hockey league at age fourteen with the GCK Lions Frauen in the Leistungsklasse C (LKC; renamed SWHL C in 2014). She also played on the under-15 (U15) teams of EHC Bülach in the Swiss boys' premier and second-tier U15 leagues during the 2009–10 season.

At age fifteen, she made her debut in Switzerland's elite senior women's ice hockey league, the Leistungsklasse A (LKA; renamed SWHL A in 2014), with the ZHC Lions Frauen. Across fifteen games with the Lions in the 2010–11 season, Staiger recorded 4 goals and 6 assists for 10 points. Concurrently, she tallied 2 goals and an assist in ten games with the top EHC Bülach U15 team.

Staiger continued to split her time between the ZSC Lions Frauen and elite boys' junior teams throughout her teens, playing with EHC Bülach U17 during the 2011–12 season, EV Dielsdorf-Niederhasli U17 during the 2012–13 season, and EHC Winterthur U17 during the 2013–14 and 2014–15 seasons.

Though most of her career was spent with the ZSC Lions in the LKA/SWHL A, Staiger chose to play the 2017–18 and 2019–20 seasons with EHC Zunzgen-Sissach Damen in the SWHL B.

When Staiger officially retired from elite play in 2020, she was one of just twenty players to have recorded more than one hundred games with the GCK/ZSC Lions Frauen.

=== International play ===
As a junior player with the Swiss national under-18 team, Staiger participated in three IIHF U18 Women's World Championships – the Top Division tournament in 2012 and the Division I tournaments in 2013 and 2014. She served as Switzerland's captain at the 2014 tournament and led all tournament defenseman in assists, contributing to a Swiss victory in the tournament and their promotion to the Top Division.

With the senior national team, Staiger participated at the IIHF Women's World Championship in 2015 and 2016. She represented Switzerland in the qualification tournament for the 2018 Winter Olympics, at which the Swiss qualified for the Games.

== Officiating career ==
Staiger has served as a referee in the Swiss system since 2020, where she has officiated in the Women's League (SWHL A) and men's 1. Liga.

She has also officiated at International Ice Hockey Federation (IIHF) and IIHF-affiliated events, including at the 2022–23 Euro Hockey Tour's 5-Nations Tournament in Ängelholm and the Group A tournament of the 2024 IIHF U18 Women's World Championship Division I.

== Personal life ==
Staiger has two brothers who are also engaged in ice hockey. Her eldest brother, Willy (born 1989), has played in the 2. Liga with EHC Bassersdorf for more than a decade and her elder brother, Anthony (born 1993), is captain of EHC Winterthur in the Swiss League.
