= Anne Bartsch =

German ice hockey player (born 1995)

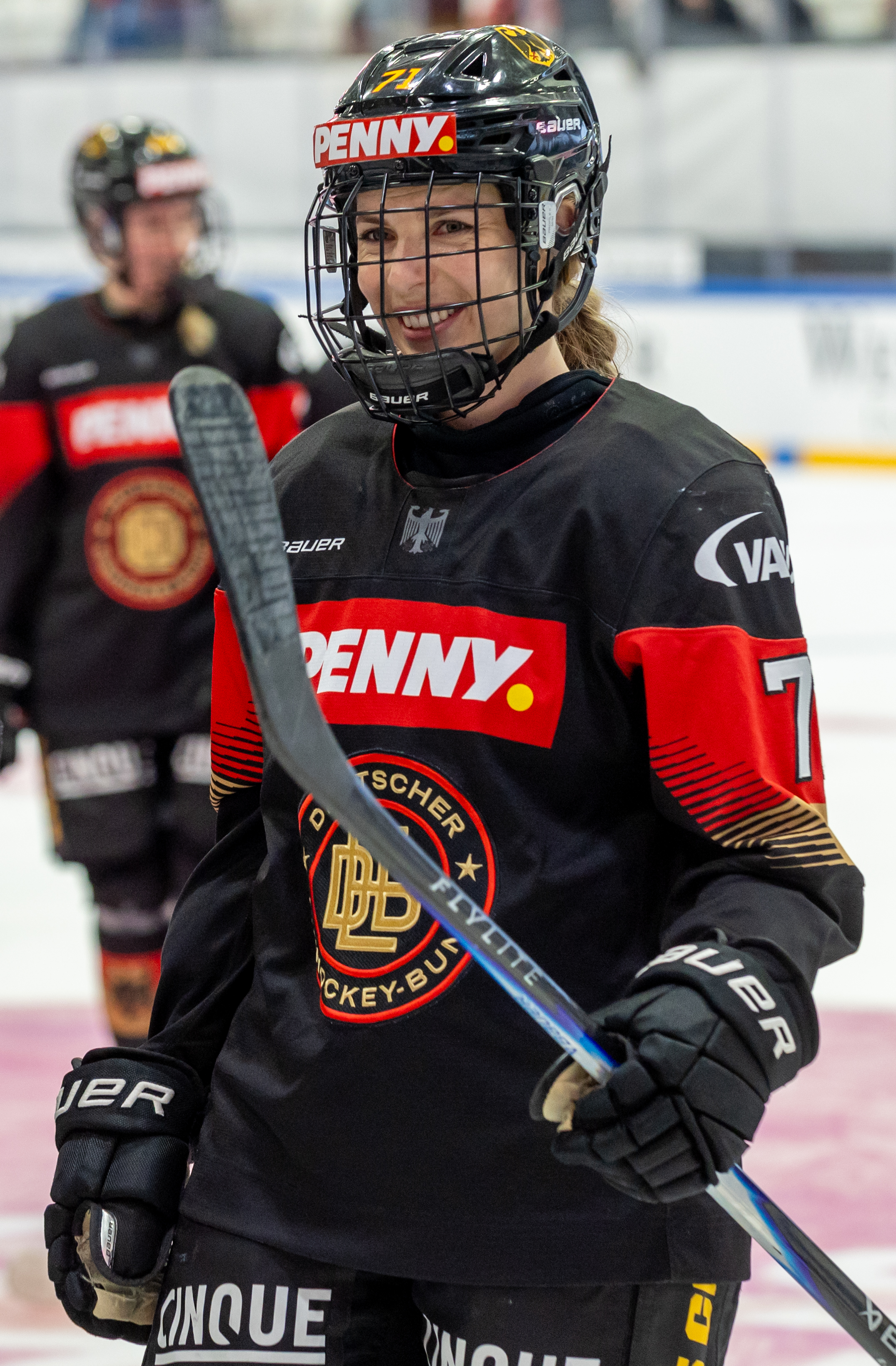
- Bartsch in 2026
- Born: 22 September 1995 (age 30) Zittau, Germany
- Height: 1.63 m (5 ft 4 in)
- Weight: 61 kg (134 lb; 9 st 8 lb)
- Position: Forward
- Shoots: Left
- DFEL team Former teams: ECDC Memmingen; OSC Eisladies Berlin; HV71; Eisbären Juniors Berlin
- National team: Germany
- Playing career: 2010–present

Anne Bartsch (born 22 September 1995) is a German ice hockey player for ECDC Memmingen of the German women's ice hockey Bundesliga (DFEL).

== International play ==
Bartsch represented the Germany national team at the 2026 Winter Olympics and the 2015, 2017, 2019, 2022, 2023, and 2025 IIHF Women's World Championship.
