= Oona Parviainen =

Finnish ice hockey player and coach

- Born: 5 September 1977 (age 49) Kuopio, North Savo, Finland
- Height: 170 cm (5 ft 7 in)
- Weight: 63 kg (139 lb; 9 st 13 lb)
- Position: Forward
- Shot: Left
- Played for: Rovaniemen Kiekko; KalPa Kuopio; Espoo Blues
- Current coach: Rovaniemen Kiekko
- National team: Finland
- Playing career: 1993–2021
- Coaching career: 2023–present

Oona Parviainen (born 5 September 1977) is a Finnish retired ice hockey player and the head coach of Rovaniemen Kiekko (RoKi) in the Naisten Liiga. She played with the Finnish national team during 2001 to 2006 and competed in the women's ice hockey tournaments at the 2002 Winter Olympics and the 2006 Winter Olympics and at the 2005 IIHF Women's World Championship. For the 2026–2027 season, Oona Parviainen moved to Canada to coach a team at the Pilot Mound Hockey Academy in the CSSHL.

== Playing career ==
Parviainen announced her retirement at age 43, following the 2020–21 Naisten Liiga season, during which she was an alternate captain of RoKi. Her club career comprised 21 seasons in the Finnish women's leagues, with the Espoo Blues, KalPa Kuopio, and RoKi, and included nine Finnish Championship titles.
