= Hanna Thuvik =

Swedish ice hockey player (born 2002)

- Born: 17 May 2002 (age 24) Tjörn, Sweden
- Height: 170 cm (5 ft 7 in)
- Weight: 71 kg (157 lb; 11 st 3 lb)
- Position: Centre/left wing
- Shoots: Left
- SDHL team Former teams: Brynäs IF; Göteborg HC; Trollhättans HC; Rönnängs IK
- National team: Sweden
- Playing career: 2016–present
Medal record
World Championship
Bronze medal – third place	2026 Denmark

Hanna Thuvik (born 17 May 2002) is a Swedish ice hockey forward for Brynäs IF of the Swedish Women's Hockey League (Swedish: Svenska damhockeyligan, SDHL).

== Career ==
Thuvik grew up in Skärhamn, playing for the junior boys' teams of Rönnängs IK, eight kilometres away in a neighbouring town. In 2016, at the age of 14, she was offered a contract with senior-club Trollhättans HC in Damtvåan. She scored 40 points in 8 games as the team earned promotion to Damettan.

Ahead of the 2018–19 season, she signed with top-flight club Göteborg HC. She scored 10 points in 36 games in her debut SDHL season, as the club finished in last but were able to keep their top-flight place after a successful relegation playoff. She was named an assistant captain for Göteborg for the 2019–20 season, where she almost doubled her point production, scoring 17 points in 32 games.

In the 2020 off-season, she left Göteborg to sign with Brynäs IF.

== International play ==
Thuvik has represented Sweden at the 2019 and 2020 IIHF World Women's U18 Championship. She participated in her first senior national team camp in August 2020, being called up as a replacement for the injured Hanna Olsson.

On 12 January 2026, she was named to Sweden's roster to compete at the 2026 Winter Olympics.
