= Lara Stalder =

Swiss ice hockey player (born 1994)

- Born: 15 May 1994 (age 32) Lucerne, Switzerland
- Height: 1.67 m (5 ft 6 in)
- Weight: 63 kg (139 lb; 9 st 13 lb)
- Position: Centre
- Shoots: Right
- PFWL team Former teams: EV Zug: Brynäs IF; Linköping HC; Minnesota Duluth Bulldogs; ZSC Lions; KSC Küssnacht am Rigi; SC Reinach
- National team: Switzerland
- Playing career: 2008–present
Medal record
Olympic Games
Bronze medal – third place	2014 Sochi	Team
Bronze medal – third place	2026 Milano Cortina	Team

Lara Stalder (born 15 May 1994) is a Swiss ice hockey centre and captain of the Swiss national ice hockey team. She plays in the PostFinance Women's League with EV Zug and serves as the team's captain. Her college ice hockey career was played with the Minnesota Duluth Bulldogs women's ice hockey team and she has previously played in the Swedish Women's Hockey League (SDHL) with Linköping HC and Brynäs IF.

== Playing career ==
Across four seasons with Minnesota Duluth, Stalder put up 148 points in 134 games, leading the team in points in her final season, as well as being named WCHA Player of the Year and Student-Athlete of the Year, and being a top-three finalist for the Patty Kazmaier Award. In 2016, she was drafted 20th overall by the Boston Pride of the National Women's Hockey League (NWHL).

After missing most of the 2018–19 season due to a shoulder injury, Stalder left Linköping to sign with Brynäs. In 2020, she was named SDHL Player of the Year after putting up 71 points in 36 games, being the first woman to win Guldhjälmen. The 42 goals she would score that year is the second highest single-season total in SDHL history, and her 71 points the third highest single-season total in SDHL history.

=== International ===
Stalder made her senior national team debut at the 2011 IIHF Women's World Championship. She represented Switzerland at the Winter Olympics in 2014 and won the bronze medal after defeating Sweden in the bronze medal playoff. She would score 6 points in 6 games at the 2018 Winter Olympics, as Switzerland finished in 5th place.

In the quarterfinal round of the 2026 Winter Olympics, Stadler earned one of the assists on Alina Müller's goal. Switzerland defeated Finland in a 1-0 final, returning to the semifinals for the third time in four Olympics. Of note, Stalder and Müller were the only members of the 2026 Olympic team that were part of the Swiss roster at the 2014 Winter Olympics .

== Career statistics ==
=== Club ===
			Regular season					Playoffs
Season	Team	League	GP	G	A	Pts	PIM	GP	G	A	Pts	PIM
2007-08	SC Reinach Damen	SWHL A	13	0	7	7	20	3	1	0	1	2
2008-09	KSC Küssnacht am Rigi Damen	SWHL A	9	3	6	9	10	3	1	2	3	6
2009-10	SC Reinach Damen	SWHL A	7	2	6	8	20	1	0	1	1	2
2010-11	SC Reinach Damen	SWHL A	9	6	8	14	41	3	1	6	7	10
2011-12	SC Reinach Damen	SWHL A	6	1	2	3	2	1	1	1	2	2
2012-13	ZSC Lions Frauen	SWHL A	11	8	16	24	10	7	6	4	10	2
2013-14	Minnesota Duluth Bulldogs	NCAA	28	4	18	22	39	-	-	-	-	-
2014-15	Minnesota Duluth Bulldogs	NCAA	37	10	19	29	14	-	-	-	-	-
2015-16	Minnesota Duluth Bulldogs	NCAA	34	17	24	41	29	-	-	-	-	-
2016-17	Minnesota Duluth Bulldogs	NCAA	35	23	33	56	14	-	-	-	-	-
2017-18	Linköping HC	SDHL	36	39	22	61	28	9	4	3	7	2
2018-19	Linköping HC	SDHL	18	16	22	38	12	-	-	-	-	-
2019-20	Brynäs IF	SDHL	36	42	29	71	41	5	4	4	8	2
2020-21	Brynäs IF	SDHL	36	31	51	82	24	8	2	11	13	4
2021-22	Brynäs IF	SDHL	33	34	55	89	12	8	6	8	14	2
2022-23	Brynäs IF	SDHL	32	18	43	61	16	8	3	9	12	4
2023-24	EV Zug Damen	SWHL B	17	63	66	129	6	7	28	28	56	4
2023-24	EV Zug Damen	National Cup	5	9	14	23	0	-	-	-	-	-
SWHL A totals			55	20	45	65	103	18	10	14	24	24
NCAA totals			134	54	94	148	96	-	-	-	-	-
SDHL A totals			155	141	200	341	105	29	15	32	47	12

=== International ===
Year	Team	Event	GP	G	A	Pts	PIM
2010	Switzerland U18	WJC18 D1	5	4	5	9	2
2011	Switzerland U18	WJC18	6	3	4	7	6
2011	Switzerland	WC	5	0	2	2	10
2012	Switzerland	WJC18	6	4	2	6	12
2014	Switzerland	OG	5	1	1	2	6
2015	Switzerland	WC	4	1	3	4	4
2016	Switzerland	WC	5	3	5	8	12
2017	Switzerland	WC	6	4	5	9	2
2018	Switzerland	OG	6	3	3	6	4
2021	Switzerland	WC	7	1	1	2	6
2022	Switzerland	OG	7	5	4	9	2
2022	Switzerland	WC	5	1	3	4	0
2023	Switzerland	WC	7	4	7	11	35
2024	Switzerland	WC	6	3	0	3	6
2025	Switzerland	WC	4	1	1	2	4
2026	Switzerland	OG	7	0	2	2	2
Junior totals			17	11	11	22	20
WC totals			49	18	27	45	79
OG totals			25	9	10	19	14

== Honours and achievements ==
=== SWHL-A ===
- 2012-2013 : Champion with ZSC Lions Frauen
- 2025-2026 : Champion with EV Zug Frauen

=== NCAA ===
- WCHA Offensive Player of the Week (Week of 17 January 2017)
- WCHA Offensive Player of the Week (Week of 24 January 2017)
- WCHA Offensive Player of the Week (Week of 31 January 2017)
- WCHA Offensive Player of the Month, January 2017
- Women's Hockey Commissioners' Association National Division I Player of the Month, January 2017
- 2016-2017 : First Team All-American
- 2016-2017 : Top Female Collegiate Player (Patty Kazmaier Award) Finalist (Top-3)

=== SDHL ===
- 2017-2018 : Most Goals (39)
- 2017-2018 : Most PP Goals (8)
- 2017-2018 : SM-silver Medal with Linköping HC
- 2018-2019 : SM-silver Medal with Linköping HC
- 2019-2020 : Forward of the Year
- 2019-2020 : Most Goals (42)
- 2019-2020 : Most Points (71)
- 2019-2020 : Most PP Goals (7)
- 2019-2020 : Most SH Goals (5)
- 2019-2020 : Most Valuable Player (Guldhjälmen)
- 2020-2021 : Forward of the Year
- 2020-2021 : Most Assists (51)
- 2020-2021 : Most Goals (31)
- 2020-2021 : Most Points (82)
- 2020-2021 : Most Valuable Player
- 2020-2021 : Most Assists Playoffs (11)
- 2020-2021 : SM-silver Medal with Brynäs IF
- 2021-2022 : Forward of the Year
- 2021-2022 : Best Plus/Minus (+63)
- 2021-2022 : Most Assists (55)
- 2021-2022 : Most Goals (34)
- 2021-2022 : Most Points (89)
- 2021-2022 : SM-silver Medal with Brynäs IF
- 2022-2023 : Most Assists (43)
- 2022-2023 : Most Points (61)
- 2022-2023 : Most Assists Playoffs (9)
- 2022-2023 : SM-silver Medal with Brynäs IF

=== Swiss Women Cup ===
- 2023-2024 : Most Points (23 pts)

=== SwWHL-B ===
- 2023-2024 : Most Assists (66)
- 2023-2024 : Most Goals (63)
- 2023-2024 : Most Points (129)
- 2023-2024 : Most Assists Playoffs (28)
- 2023-2024 : Most Goals Playoffs (28)
- 2023-2024 : Most Points Playoffs (56)
- 2023-2024 : Champion with EV Zug Damen

=== WC U18 ===
- 2010 : Best Defenseman in Division D1
- 2010 : Best Plus/minus in Division D1 (+18)
- 2010 : Most Assists by Defenseman in Division D1 (5)
- 2010 : Most Points by Defenseman in Division D1 (9)
- 2010 : Gold Medal in Division D1
- 2011 : Most Points by Defenseman (7)
- 2011 : Top 3 Player on Team
- 2012 : Most Points by Defenseman (6)

=== WC ===
- 2016 : Most Assists (5)
- 2016 : Most Penalized Player (12)
- 2021 : Top 3 Player on Team
- 2023 : Most Penalized Player (35)
- 2023 : Top 3 Player on Team

=== OG ===
- 2014 : Bronze Medal

=== Other ===
- 2017 : Swiss Woman of the Year
- 2021 : Swiss Woman of the Year
