= Lova Blom =

Swedish ice hockey player (born 2003)

- Born: 15 July 2003 (age 23) Stockholm, Sweden
- Height: 168 cm (5 ft 6 in)
- Weight: 70 kg (154 lb; 11 st 0 lb)
- Position: Centre
- Shoots: Left
- SDHL team Former teams: Linköping HC; Djurgårdens IF
- National team: Sweden
- Playing career: 2019–present
Medal record
World Championship
Bronze medal – third place	2026 Denmark

Lova Blom (born 15 July 2003) is a Swedish ice hockey centre and alternate captain of Linköping HC in the Swedish Women's Hockey League (SDHL).

== Playing career ==
Blom began playing hockey at the age of four, first stepping on the ice at Rosvalla Nyköping Eventcenter. From 2017 to 2018, she played for the under-16 boys' team of Nyköpings HF in the U16 Division 1, scoring a total of 32 points in 23 games. She split the 2017–18 season between Nyköping and the women's ice hockey team of Hammarby IF in the Damettan, scoring 20 points in 12 games. In 2018, she became the sixth girl in history to participate in the boys' U15 TV-pucken tournament, before the tournament was expanded to include both boys' and girls' teams in 2019.

Ahead of the 2019–20 season, she left Nyköpings HF to sign with Djurgårdens IF in the SDHL, the top flight of women's ice hockey in Sweden. In her rookie SDHL season, she scored 10 points in 29 games.

She is currently regarded as one of the most promising young players in Sweden.

== International career ==
Blom played with the Swedish national under-18 team at the IIHF Women's U18 World Championships in 2018, 2019, and 2020, winning a silver medal in 2018.
