= Naisten Suomi-sarja =

Finnish ice hockey league

- Sport: Ice hockey
- Founded: 2003
- First season: 2003–04
- Administrator: Finnish Ice Hockey Association
- No. of teams: 13
- Countries: Finland
- Promotion to: Naisten Mestis

The Naisten Suomi-sarja (lit. 'Women's Finland Series'), distinguished as the Jääkiekon naisten Suomi-sarja (lit. 'Ice Hockey Women's Finland Series'), is the third-tier women's national ice hockey league in Finland. It was established by the Finnish Ice Hockey Association in 2003 and is the lowest tier of national ice hockey competition, below the premier Auroraliiga and secondary Naisten Mestis, but above regional leagues (Finnish: Naisten alueelliset harrastesarjat).

== Season format ==
=== 2023–24 season ===
Beginning in the 2023–24 season, the Naisten Mestis adopted the ten team, 36-game format used by the Auroraliiga. Since then, all teams not playing in the Auroraliiga or Naisten Mestis and any new teams play in the Naisten Suomi-sarja by default. The top teams in the Naisten Suomi-sarja have the opportunity to earn promotion to the Naisten Mestis in a promotion/relegation series against the bottom ranked Naisten Mestis teams at the end of the season.

=== Previous formats ===
2022–23 season

Excepting the ten teams of the Naisten Liiga, all women's ice hockey teams competing at the national level began the season in the Naisten Mestis qualifiers (Finnish: karsinta). The Naisten Mestis qualifiers, which were contested during September to December 2022, involved eighteen teams divided into three groups of five to seven teams. In the closed groups, each team played every other team at least twice. The top eight teams at the end of the qualifiers continued in the Naisten Mestis and the remaining teams filled the ranks of the Naisten Suomi-sarja.

2016–2022 seasons

With the exception of the eight Naisten SM-sarja teams, all women's teams started the season in the Naisten Mestis qualifiers. The top eight teams qualified for the Naisten Mestis regular season and the remaining teams continued the season in the Naisten Suomi-sarja.

The best four teams of the Naisten Suomi-sarja regular season earned placement in the finals of the Naisten Mestis. The other teams continued the season in the final series of the Naisten Suomi-sarja. The series winner was determined in the final tournament.

== Teams ==
Location in Finland of teams participating in Lohko 1 and Lohko 2 of the 2023–24 Naisten Suomi-sarja season.
Location in Uusimaa (yellow) and eastern Southwest Finland (gray, left) of teams participating in Lohko 1 of the 2023–24 Naisten Suomi-sarja season.

=== 2023–24 season ===
Lohko 1

- HIFK Challenger, Helsinki
- Ilves Akatemia, Tampere
- Kiekko-Espoo Challenger, Espoo
- Pelicans, Lahti
- Salo HT, Salo
- TPS Akatemia, Turku
- Turku HC, Turku

Lohko 2

- Jyvässeudun Kiekko (JyKi), Jyväskylä
- KeuPa, Keuruu
- Kiilat, Haapajärvi
- LL-89 Red Lights, Lapinlahti
- Muhoksen Jääklubi (MuJK), Muhos
- S-Kiekko, Seinäjoki

=== Teams in previous seasons ===
Each team that participated in the Naisten Suomi-sarja is listed by rank within their lohko (lit. 'group') at the end of the regular season.

==== 2022–23 season ====
Lohko 1

1. Panelian Raikas (PaRa), Eura
2. TPS Akatemia, Turku
3. Salo HT, Salo
4. Pelicans, Lahti
5. HIFK N18, Helsinki
6. Turku HC, Turku
7. Ilves Akatemia, Tampere

Lohko 2

1. Kiilat, Haapajärvi
2. Jyvässeudun Kiekko (JyKi), Jyväskylä
3. LL-89 Red Lights, Lapinlahti
4. Muhoksen Jääklubi (MuJK), Muhos
5. S-Kiekko, Seinäjoki

==== 2021–22 season ====
Lohko 1

1. LL-89 Red Lights, Lapinlahti
2. Kiilat, Haapajärvi
3. Kajastus, Kontiolahti
4. TeKi, Raahe
5. JyKi, Jyväskylä
6. KalPa Akatemia, Kuopio
7. S-Kiekko, Seinäjoki

Lohko 2

1. SaiPa, Lappeenranta
2. Pelicans, Lahti
3. HIFK Akatemia, Helsinki
4. Kiekko-Espoo Akatemia, Espoo

Lohko 3

1. TPS Akatemia, Turku
2. PaRa, Panelia
3. Turku HC, Turku

==== 2020–21 season ====
Lohko 1

1. KJT Haukat, Kerava
2. Pelicans, Lahti
3. Rockets, Loimaa
4. Uudenkaupungin Jää-Kotkat (UJK), Uusikaupunki

Lohko 2

1. LL-89, Lapinlahti
2. KalPa Akatemia, Kuopio
3. TeKi-Hermes, Raahe/Kokkola
4. SaiPa, Lappeenranta (did not play)

==== 2019–20 season ====
Lohko 1

1. Kiekko-Espoo Akatemia, Espoo
2. Uudenkaupungin Jää-Kotkat (UJK), Uusikaupunki
3. Rockets, Loima
4. PaRa, Panelia
5. Salo HT, Salo

Lohko 2

1. Hermes, Kokkola
2. LL-89, Lapinlahti
3. KalPa Akatemia, Kuopio
4. Teräs-Kiekko (TeKi), Raahe
5. Jukurit, Mikkeli

==== 2018–19 season ====
Lohko 1

1. Espoon Kiekkoseura (EKS), Espoo
2. Uudenkaupungin Jää-Kotkat (UJK), Uusikaupunki
3. Salo HT, Salo
4. Rockets, Loimaa
5. PaRa, Panelia

Lohko 2

1. Ylivieskan Jääkarhut (YJK), Ylivieska
2. Ruoveden Seurakunnan Atleetit (RuoSkA), Ruovesi
3. Ähtärin Kiekko-Haukat (KieHa), Ähtäri
4. Junkkarit Hockey Team (JHT), Kalajoki

Lohko 3

1. SaiPa
2. KalPa Akatemia
3. LL-89 Red Lights,
4. Jukurit, Mikkeli
5. Joensuun Kiekko-Pojat (Jokipojat), Joensuu
