= Lisa Johansson (ice hockey) =

Swedish ice hockey player (born 1992)

- Born: 11 April 1992 (age 34) Nybro, Sweden
- Height: 1.61 m (5 ft 3 in)
- Weight: 59 kg (130 lb; 9 st 4 lb)
- Position: Wing
- Shoots: Right
- SDHL team Former teams: SDE HF: Luleå HF; AIK IF; Växjö Lakers; Leksands IF
- National team: Sweden
- Playing career: 2006–present
Medal record
World Championship
Bronze medal – third place	2026 Denmark

Lisa Ida Marie Johansson (born 11 April 1992) is a Swedish ice hockey player for SDE HF of the Swedish Women's Hockey League (SDHL). She is also a member of the Swedish national team and is a three-time Olympian.

== Playing career ==
Johansson was named SDHL Player of the Year for the 2016–17 season by the Swedish Ice Hockey Association.

== International play ==
She represented Sweden in the women's ice hockey tournament at the 2018 Winter Olympics in PyeongChang and in the women's ice hockey tournament at the 2022 Winter Olympics in Beijing. She also participated in the IIHF Women's World Championship tournaments in 2013, 2016, 2017, and 2019.

On 12 January 2026, she was named to Sweden's roster to compete at the 2026 Winter Olympics.
