= Quennec =

Quennec is a surname. Notable people with the surname include:

- Hugh Quennec (born 1965), Swiss sports team owner
- Kaleigh Quennec (born 1998), Canadian-Swiss ice hockey player
