= Jessica Adolfsson =

Swedish ice hockey player (born 1998)

- Born: 15 July 1998 (age 27) Linköping, Sweden
- Height: 1.76 m (5 ft 9 in)
- Weight: 74 kg (163 lb; 11 st 9 lb)
- Position: Defense
- Shoots: Left
- PWHL team SDHL team Former teams: Ottawa Charge; HV71: Linköping HC; Brynäs IF; Djurgårdens IF Hockey
- National team: Sweden
- Playing career: 2012–present

Jessica Mariette Adolfsson (born 15 July 1998) is a Swedish professional ice hockey player for the Ottawa Charge of the Professional Women's Hockey League (PWHL) and a member of Sweden women's national ice hockey team.

== Playing career ==
=== College ===
Adolfsson played three seasons (2018–21) of college ice hockey with the Penn State Nittany Lions women's ice hockey program in the Atlantic Hockey America (AHA) conference of the NCAA Division I.

=== Professional ===
On 10 January 2025, Adolfsson signed a ten-day standard player agreement with the Ottawa Charge of the Professional Women's Hockey League (PWHL). Prior to signing in the PWHL, she played thirteen games of the 2024–25 SDHL season with HV71 in the Swedish Women's Hockey League (SDHL). During the 2024–25 season, she was scoreless in one game. On 10 July 2025, she signed a one-year contract extension with the Charge.

== International play ==
Adolfsson represented Sweden at the 2022 Winter Olympics and at the IIHF Women's World Championship in 2017, 2019, and 2022.

On 12 January 2026, she was named to Sweden's roster to compete at the 2026 Winter Olympics. Adolfsson was one of four Nittany Lions participating in women's ice hockey at the 2026 Winter Olympics, including Tessa Janecke, skating for Team USA, plus Matilde Fantin of Team Italy and Nicole Hall, a teammate on Team Sweden.

== Career statistics ==
=== Regular season and playoffs ===
			Regular Season					Playoffs
Season	Team	League	GP	G	A	Pts	PIM	GP	G	A	Pts	PIM
2012-13	Linköping HC	Riksserien	16	0	1	1	0	4	0	0	0	0
2013-14	Linköping HC	Riksserien	28	0	2	2	16	3	0	0	0	0
2014-15	Linköping HC	Riksserien	27	4	7	11	16	5	0	0	0	6
2015-16	Brynäs IF	Riksserien	34	2	4	6	22	2	0	0	0	2
2016-17	Brynäs IF	SDHL	32	5	8	13	24	2	0	1	1	0
2017-18	Djurgårdens IF	SDHL	28	3	7	10	18	4	1	2	3	4
2018–19	Penn State Nittany Lions	CHA	35	5	7	12	30	–	–	–	–	–
2019–20	Penn State Nittany Lions	CHA	12	0	2	2	8	—	—	—	—	—
2020–21	Penn State Nittany Lions	CHA	21	4	7	11	19	—	—	—	—	—
2021-22	Linköping HC	SDHL	33	6	19	25	14	7	1	4	5	4
2022-23	Linköping HC	SDHL	23	4	10	14	28	1	0	0	0	0
2023-24	Linköping HC	SDHL	8	1	1	2	8	3	0	0	0	0
2024-25	HV71	SDHL	13	0	4	4	8	—	—	—	—	—
2024-25	Ottawa Charge	PWHL	1	0	0	0	0	—	—	—	—	—
PWHL totals			1	0	0	0	0	0	0	0	0	0

== See also ==
- List of Pennsylvania State University Olympians
