= Kristin O'Neill =

Canadian ice hockey player (born 1998)

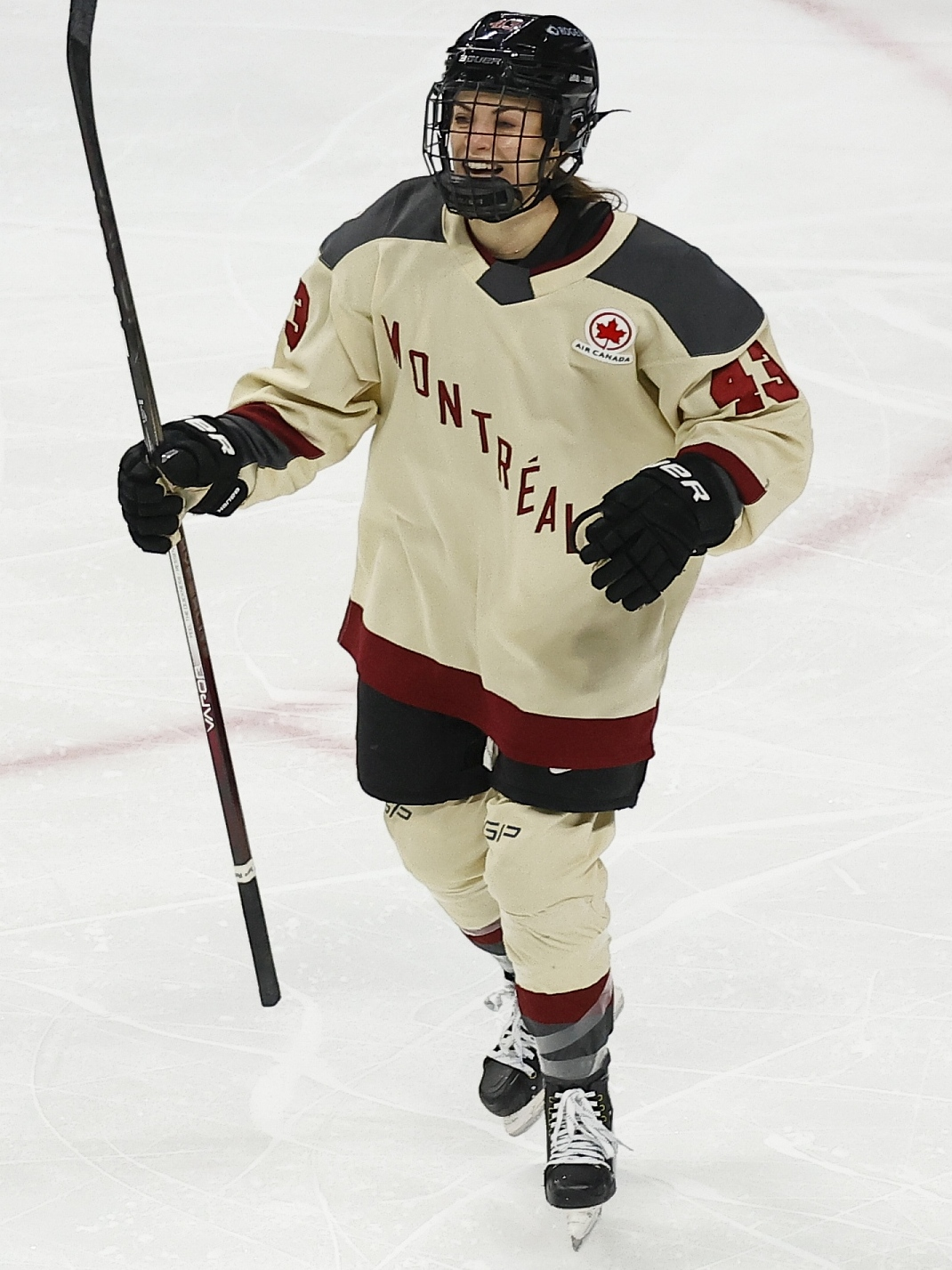
- O'Neill with PWHL Montreal in 2024
- Born: March 30, 1998 (age 28) Oakville, Ontario, Canada
- Height: 5 ft 4 in (163 cm)
- Weight: 125 lb (57 kg; 8 st 13 lb)
- Position: Forward
- Shoots: Left
- PWHL team Former teams: San Jose Sea Lions; Montreal Victoire; New York Sirens
- National team: Canada
- Playing career: 2012–present
Medal record
Women's ice hockey
Representing Canada
Olympic Games
Silver medal – second place	2026 Milano Cortina	Team
World Championships
Gold medal – first place	2021 Canada
Gold medal – first place	2022 Denmark
Gold medal – first place	2024 United States
Silver medal – second place	2023 Canada
Silver medal – second place	2025 Czechia
Silver medal – second place	2026 Denmark
4 Nations Cup
Silver medal – second place	2018 Canada

Kristin O'Neill (born March 30, 1998) is a Canadian professional ice hockey forward for the San Jose Sea Lions of the Professional Women's Hockey League (PWHL) and member of the Canadian national team, with whom she won silver at the 2026 Winter Olympics. She previously played for the Montreal Victoire and New York Sirens.

== Playing career ==
=== Junior ===
Later that year, she won the Provincial Women's Hockey League championship with the Stoney Creek Jr. Sabres. With the same Sabres team, she would also gain a silver medal at the 2015 OWHA Provincial championships.

During her final season (2015–16) in the Provincial Women's Hockey League, she was bestowed the captaincy of the Stoney Creek Jr. Sabres. Leading the team in goals, assists and points, she ranked sixth overall in the league. In addition, she was part of the Team Ontario Red roster that won the gold medal at the 2015 Canadian Under-18 Women's Nationals.

=== College ===
As a freshman, O'Neill ranked second in scoring on the Cornell Big Red. Finishing as the NCAA's leading scorer in shorthanded goals with five, she placed seventh in the nation among all freshman with 0.84 points per game.

O'Neill experienced greater success as a sophomore. In addition to leading the Big Red in scoring, she tied for the NCAA lead in shorthanded goals, scoring four, while her seven game-winning goals tied for fourth in the nation. Recognized as the Ivy League Player of the Year, she also gained spots on the ECAC and Ivy League First-Team All-Stars, respectively.

=== Professional ===
PWHL Montreal of the Professional Women's Hockey League (PWHL) selected O'Neill in the second round, seventh overall, of the 2023 PWHL Draft. On October 30, she joined Montreal on a three-year contract. At the end of December, O'Neill was named one of Montreal's alternate captains for road games.

During the 2024–25 season, O'Neill recorded one goal and four assists in 30 regular season games, and one goal and one assist in four playoff games during the 2025 PWHL playoffs. Following the season, at the 2025 PWHL Draft, she was traded to the New York Sirens along with the 28th overall pick in exchange for forward Abby Roque. During the 2025–26 season, she recorded four goals and one assist in 30 games.

During the league's expansion to 12 teams ahead of the 2026–27 season, she was left unprotected by the Sirens and accepted an Expansion Foundational Offer (EFO) with the San Jose Sea Lions on June 6, 2026.

== International play ==
In 2013, O'Neill participated with Team Ontario Blue at the 2013 Canadian Under-18 Women's Nationals, securing a silver medal. O'Neill was named to the Ontario team, which captured the silver medal in women's ice hockey at the 2015 Canada Winter Games.

O'Neill and Jamie Lee Rattray recorded the assists on Loren Gabel's first career goal for the Canadian team in a 2–1 preliminary round loss on November 7, 2018, versus the United States at the 4 Nations Cup.

On January 9, 2026, she was named to Canada's roster to compete at the 2026 Winter Olympics. On February 7, 2026, O'Neill was one of six Canadian skaters making their Olympic debut as Canada played Switzerland. Two days later, O'Neill contributed a goal as Canada prevailed over Czechia in a 5-1 final. She was part of the squad which won the silver medal following a 2-1 loss against the United States, in which she scored the opening goal, on February 19, 2026.

== Career statistics ==
=== Regular season and playoffs ===
			Regular season					Playoffs
Season	Team	League	GP	G	A	Pts	PIM	GP	G	A	Pts	PIM
2012–13	Stoney Creek Jr. Sabres	Prov. WHL	2	0	0	0	0	—	—	—	—	—
2013–14	Stoney Creek Jr. Sabres	Prov. WHL	33	15	17	32	46	7	2	2	4	6
2014–15	Stoney Creek Jr. Sabres	Prov. WHL	33	15	18	33	34	10	1	6	7	10
2015–16	Stoney Creek Jr. Sabres	Prov. WHL	31	19	18	37	46	7	6	4	10	6
2016–17	Cornell University	ECAC	31	14	12	26	34	—	—	—	—	—
2017–18	Cornell University	ECAC	31	20	21	41	30	—	—	—	—	—
2018–19	Cornell University	ECAC	33	22	16	38	32	—	—	—	—	—
2019–20	Cornell University	ECAC	30	25	15	40	38	—	—	—	—	—
2020–21	Team Bauer	PWHPA	4	2	0	2	4	—	—	—	—	—
2021–22	Team Harvey's	PWHPA	4	1	3	4	8	—	—	—	—	—
2022–23	Team Adidas	PWHPA	20	9	12	21	12	—	—	—	—	—
2023–24	PWHL Montreal	PWHL	23	4	5	9	8	3	2	0	2	0
2024–25	Montreal Victoire	PWHL	30	1	4	5	24	4	1	1	2	2
2025–26	New York Sirens	PWHL	30	4	1	5	14	—	—	—	—	—
PWHL totals			83	9	10	19	46	7	3	1	4	2

=== International ===
Year	Team	Event	Result	GP	G	A	Pts	PIM
2015	Canada	U18	2nd place, silver medalist(s)	5	1	2	3	4
2015	Ontario Red	U18	1st place, gold medalist(s)	5	1	1	2	10
2016	Canada	U18	2nd place, silver medalist(s)	5	2	3	5	4
2017	Canada	WNC	2nd place, silver medalist(s)	4	0	1	1	6
2018	Canada	WNC	5th	8	1	1	2	10
2018	Canada	4NC	2nd place, silver medalist(s)	3	0	2	2	2
2021	Canada	WC	1st place, gold medalist(s)	3	0	0	0	0
2022	Canada	WC	1st place, gold medalist(s)	7	1	2	3	2
2023	Canada	WC	2nd place, silver medalist(s)	7	0	0	0	0
2024	Canada	WC	1st place, gold medalist(s)	7	2	3	5	2
2025	Canada	WC	2nd place, silver medalist(s)	7	2	3	5	0
2026	Canada	OG	2nd place, silver medalist(s)	7	3	2	5	2
Senior totals				38	8	10	18	6

== Awards and honours ==
- 2017 ECAC All-Rookie Team
- 2017 Ivy League Rookie of the Year
- 2017 Ivy League Second All-Star Team
- 2016-17 NCAA leader in shorthanded goals (5)
- 2018 Ivy League Player of the Year Award
- 2017-18 First Team All-Ivy
- 2019-20 First Team All-Ivy
