= Jenniina Nylund =

Finnish ice hockey player (born 1999)

- Born: 18 June 1999 (age 27) Jakobstad, Finland
- Height: 1.71 m (5 ft 7 in)
- Weight: 63 kg (139 lb; 9 st 13 lb)
- Position: Centre
- Shoots: Left
- SDHL team Former teams: Brynäs IF; St. Cloud State Huskies; Team Kuortane
- National team: Finland
- Playing career: 2015–present
Medal record
Olympic Games
Bronze medal – third place	2022 Beijing	Ice hockey
World Championship
Bronze medal – third place	2021 Canada
Bronze medal – third place	2024 United States
Bronze medal – third place	2025 Czechia

Jenniina Nylund (born 18 June 1999) is a Finnish ice hockey centre for Brynäs IF Dam of the Swedish Women's Hockey League (SDHL) and member of the Finnish national ice hockey team. She played college ice hockey at St. Cloud State.

== Playing career ==
At four years of age, Nylund followed in the footsteps of her three older brothers and began playing ice hockey with the minor department of Jeppis Hockey, an ice hockey club in her hometown of Jakobstad. She joined the women's under-16 (U16) team of Kokkolan Hermes, a club in Kokkola (approx. 40 km (25 mi) northeast of Jakobstad), in her early teens and played on both the Hermes women's U16 team and the Jeppis men's U16 team during the 2014–15 season.

Ahead of the 2015–16 season, Nylund moved 130 km (80 mi) from home to Kuortane to attend the Kuortaneen urheilulukio ('Kuortane Sports Lukio') and join the school's team in the Naisten SM-sarja, the top-tier women's ice hockey league in Finland (renamed Naisten Liiga in 2017). On Team Kuortane, she played alongside several future national team teammates, including Petra Nieminen, Viivi Vainikka, Sini Karjalainen, and Anni Keisala. Nylund ranked among the team's top four point earners during her three seasons in Kuortane. In the 2017–18 Naisten Liiga season, she led the team in points and goals during the regular season and topped the league's points table in the Aurora Borealis Cup playoffs. Buoyed by the sublime scoring production of Nylund, Nieminen, and Vainikka, Team Kuortane won the 2018 Finnish Championship bronze medal – the best postseason finish in team history.

She has played 83 regular season games in the Naisten SM-sarja/Naisten Liiga, scoring 43 goals and notching 36 assists. In the Aurora Borealis Cup playoffs, she has netted nine goals and seven assists in ten games.

Upon graduating from the Kuortaneen urheilulukio, Nylund opted to play college ice hockey in the United States and joined the St. Cloud State Huskies women's ice hockey program in the Western Collegiate Hockey Association (WCHA) conference of the NCAA Division I as a freshman for the 2018–19 season. She served as an alternate captain during the 2021–22 and 2022–23 seasons. In total, Nylund scored 40 goals and 48 assists for 89 points in 139 games across five seasons with the Huskies.

Nylund signed a one-season contract with Brynäs IF for the 2023–24 SDHL season, joining fellow Finnish national team player Sini Karjalainen on the roster.

== International play ==
Nylund was a member of the Finnish national under-18 ice hockey team from 2013 to 2017. She played in the 2016 IIHF World Women's U18 Championships in St. Catharines, Ontario, at which Finland placed sixth. Despite the team's lower-than-desired finish, Nylund had a great tournament, notching two goals and four assists for six points in five games. Her point total ranked second on the Finnish team, behind Petra Nieminen (4+2), and tenth of all players participating in the tournament.

At the 2017 IIHF World Women's U18 Championship, Nylund again ranked second on the Finnish team in scoring, netting three goals in five games. The team roster featured many future senior national team players, including fellow 2021 World Championship debutants Sini Karjalainen, Julia Liikala, and Emilia Vesa. The team was talented and had quality depth, but an overtime loss to the Czech Republic in the group stage and a loss to Sweden in the quarterfinals limited them to a fifth-place finish.

Nylund first played with the senior Finnish national team in three matches during the 2016–17 international season, not recording a point. She continued to pursue the goal of being named to a World Championship roster while pursuing her college career in the United States, participating in the 2018 Four Nations Cup, at which Finland won bronze, and at two of the four tournaments in the 2019–20 Women's Euro Hockey Tour. Her goal was finally realized in April 2021, when she was named to the Finnish roster for the 2021 IIHF Women's World Championship.

On 2 January 2026, she was named to Finland's roster to compete at the 2026 Winter Olympics.

== Personal life ==
Nylund holds a bachelor's degree in marketing from St. Cloud State University in St. Cloud, Minnesota.

== Career statistics ==
=== Regular season and playoffs ===
			Regular season					Playoffs
Season	Team	League	GP	G	A	Pts	PIM	GP	G	A	Pts	PIM
2014–15	Jeppis U16	U16 Suomi-s.	15	5	6	11	6	–	–	–	–	–
2014–15	Hermes U16	U16-Tyt..	9	23	15	38	12	–	–	–	–	–
2015–16	Team Kuortane	NSMs	28	7	10	17	16	1	0	0	0	0
2016–17	Team Kuortane	NSMs	25	13	10	23	26	2	1	0	1	0
2017–18	Team Kuortane	NSML	30	23	16	39	14	7	8	7	15	6
2018–19	St. Cloud State Huskies	NCAA	35	8	13	21	10	–	–	–	–	–
2019–20	St. Cloud State Huskies	NCAA	30	4	9	13	12	–	–	–	–	–
2020–21	St. Cloud State Huskies	NCAA	19	7	5	12	14	–	–	–	–	–
2021–22	St. Cloud State Huskies	NCAA	18	7	8	15	16	–	–	–	–	–
2022–23	St. Cloud State Huskies	NCAA	37	14	14	28	37	–	–	–	–	—
Naisten Liiga totals			83	43	36	79	56	10	9	7	16	6
NCAA totals			139	40	49	89	89	–	–	–	–	–

Sources: Elite Prospects, USCHO

=== International ===
Year	Team	Event	Result	GP	G	A	Pts	PIM
2016	Finland	U18	6th	5	2	4	6	4
2017	Finland	U18	5th	5	3	0	3	4
2021	Finland	WC	3rd place, bronze medalist(s)	7	1	0	1	0
2022	Finland	OG	3rd place, bronze medalist(s)	7	1	0	1	0
2022	Finland	WC	6th	7	0	0	0	0
2023	Finland	WC	5th	7	5	2	7	2
2025	Finland	WC	3rd place, bronze medalist(s)	7	2	1	3	2
2026	Finland	OG	6th	5	0	1	1	2
Junior totals				10	5	4	9	8
Senior totals				40	9	4	13	6

== Awards and honors ==
Award	Year
International
World U18 Top-3 Player on Team	2017
World Championship Bronze Medal	2021, 2025
Olympic Bronze Medal	2022
College
WCHA All-Academic Team	2020, 2021, 2022, 2023
Naisten Liiga
Player of the Month	February 2018
