= 2016 IIHF U18 Women's World Championship =

Tournament details
- Host country: Canada
- Venues: 2 (in 1 host city)
- Dates: 8–15 January 2016
- Teams: 8

Final positions
- Champions: United States (5th title)
- Runners-up: Canada
- Third place: Sweden
- Fourth place: Russia

Tournament statistics
- Games played: 21
- Goals scored: 113 (5.38 per game)
- Attendance: 34,520 (1,644 per game)
- Scoring leader: (Switzerland) Alina Müller (9 points)

Awards
- MVP: (Russia) Valeria Tarakanova

Official website
- u18worldwomen2016.iihf.com

The 2016 IIHF U18 Women's World Championship was the ninth IIHF U18 Women's World Championship in ice hockey organized by the International Ice Hockey Federation (IIHF).

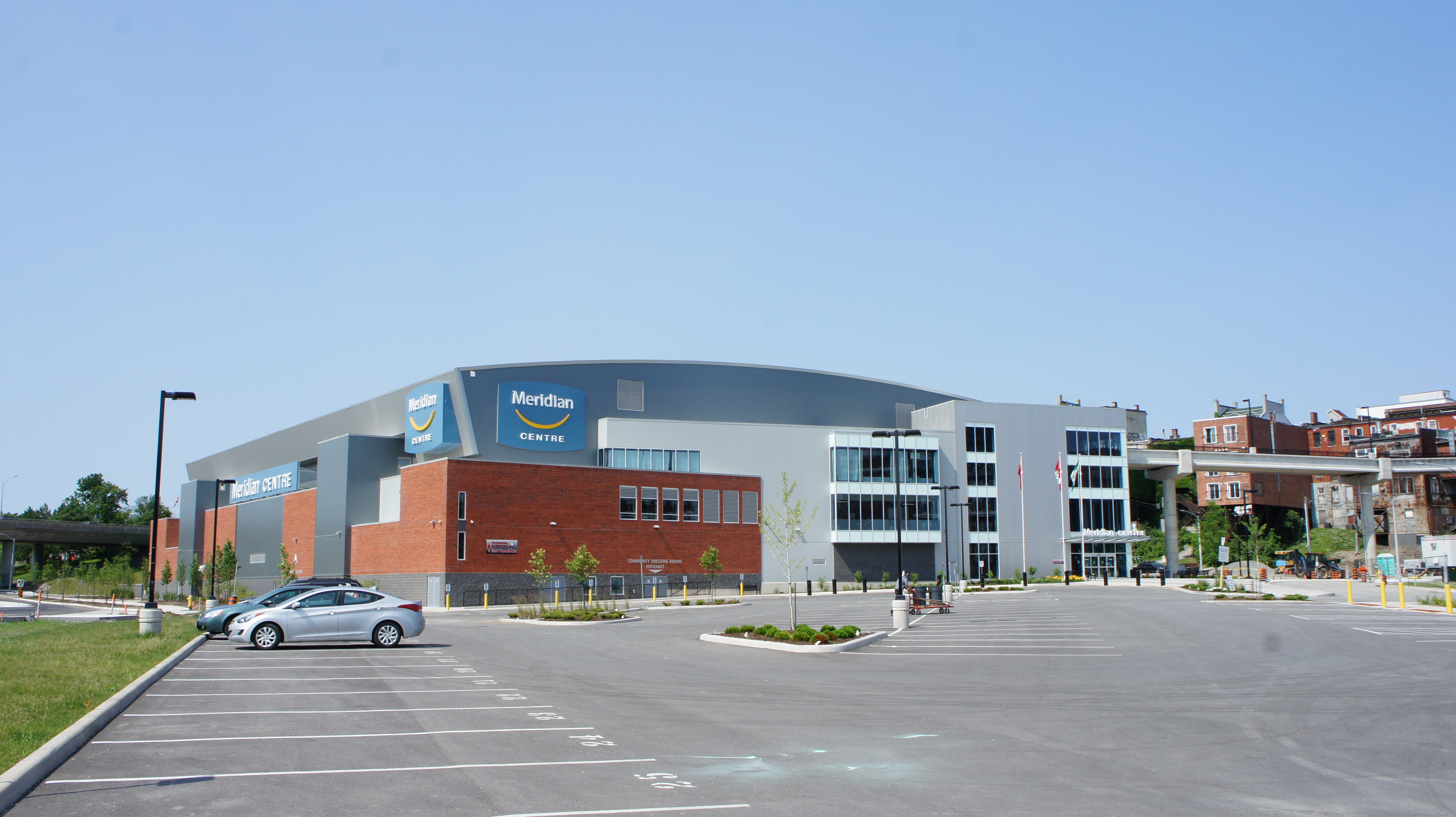
Meridian Centre the venue for the tournament

== Top Division ==
The Top Division tournament was played during 8 to 15 January 2016 in St. Catharines, Ontario, Canada.

=== Match officials ===
Six referees and nine linesmen were selected for the tournament. Christer Englund of Sweden was the tournament chairperson.

Referees

- (Canada) Brandy Dewar
- (Canada) Lisa Grison
- (Finland) Kaisa Ketonen
- (Germany) Michaela Kiefer
- (France) Marie Picavet
- (United States) Melissa Szkola

Linesmen

- (Austria) Bettina Angerer
- (Germany) Daniela Kiefer
- (United States) Jessica Leclerc
- (Germany) Lisa Linnek
- (Canada) Danielle McGurry
- (Sweden) Stina Nilsson
- (Norway) Anna Nygård
- (Canada) Justine Todd
- (France) Sueva Torribio Rousselin

=== Preliminary round ===
==== Group A ====
Pos	Team	Pld	W	OTW	OTL	L	GF	GA	GD	Pts	Qualification
1	United States	3	3	0	0	0	16	1	+15	9	Advance to semifinals
2	Canada (H)	3	2	0	0	1	17	6	+11	6	Advance to semifinals
3	Russia	3	1	0	0	2	5	13	−8	3	Advance to quarterfinals
4	Czech Republic	3	0	0	0	3	2	20	−18	0	Advance to quarterfinals

Source: IIHF
Rules for classification: 1) points; 2) head-to-head points; 3) head-to-head goal difference; 4) head-to-head number of goals scored; 5) result against closest best-ranked team outside tied teams; 6) result against second-best ranked team outside tied teams; 7) seeding before tournament.
(H) Host

8 January 2016; 16:00	United States	6–0 (2–0, 1–0, 3–0)	Czech Republic	Meridian Centre, St. Catharines; Attendance: 584

Game reference

Beth Larcom
Goalies
Kateřina Zechovská
Referee:
(Canada) Lisa Grison
Linesmen:
(Canada) Danielle McGurry
(Sweden) Stina Nilsson

Zumwinkle (Langei) – 04:31	1–0
Heise (Zumwinkle) – 18:25	2–0
Oden (SH) – 26:49	3–0
Snodgrass (Wente, Gilmore) – 56:24	4–0
Snodgrass (Ostertag) – 56:47	5–0
Skaja (Heise, Bowlby) – 57:21	6–0

14 min
Penalties
2 min
35
Shots
7

8 January 2016; 19:30	Canada	5–2 (2–0, 3–2, 0–0)	Russia	Meridian Centre, St. Catharines; Attendance: 3,564

Game reference

Stephanie Neatby
Goalies
Valeria Tarakanova
Valeria Merkusheva
Referee:
(United States) Melissa Szkola
Linesmen:
(Norway) Anna Nygård
(France) Sueva Torribio Rousselin

Shirley (Knowles) – 10:27	1–0
Bell (O'Neill) – 13:04	2–0
	2–1	23:21 – Kadirova (Beloglazova)
Houston (Potomak) (PP) – 26:39	3–1
Maltais – 29:14	4–1
Watts (Shirley) – 35:01	5–1
	5–2	37:29 – Zenchenko (Likhachyova)

8 min
Penalties
6 min
20
Shots
18

9 January 2016; 16:00	Russia	0–6 (0–0, 0–4, 0–2)	United States	Meridian Centre, St. Catharines; Attendance: 1,707

Game reference

Valeria Tarakanova
Goalies
Alex Gulstene
Referee:
(Canada) Brandy Dewar
Linesmen:
(Austria) Bettina Angerer
(Germany) Daniela Kiefer

0–1	24:49 – Snodgrass (Wente, Barnes)
0–2	30:18 – Woken (Bowlby, Barnes)
0–3	35:26 – Gilmore (Wente, Snodgrass)
0–4	36:30 – Brodt (Norby, Woken)
0–5	45:26 – Woken (Norby, Brodt) (PP)
0–6	46:10 – Gilmore (Wente)

18 min
Penalties
2 min
11
Shots
46

9 January 2016; 19:30	Canada	11–0 (3–0, 7–0, 1–0)	Czech Republic	Meridian Centre, St. Catharines; Attendance: 3,389

Game reference

Édith D'Astous Moreau
Goalies
Denisa Jandova
Kateřina Zechovská
Referee:
(France) Marie-Tjana Picavet
Linesmen:
(United States) Jessica Leclerc
(Germany) Lisa Linnek

Agnew (O'Neill, Maltais) (PP) – 18:07	1–0
Oswald (Bell) – 19:35	2–0
Potomak – 19:57	3–0
O'Neill (Bell) – 20:41	4–0
Potomak (Watts, Shirley) – 21:01	5–0
Shirley (Maltais, Potomak)	6–0
Bourbonnais (Agnew) – 32:00	7–0
Berg (Maltais) – 34:45	8–0
Agnew (Howran, Knowles) – 39:40	9–0
O'Neill (Bell, Elmes) – 39:55	10–0
Schneider (Friesen) – 49:39	11–0

10 min
Penalties
8 min
44
Shots
13

11 January 2016; 16:00	Czech Republic	2–3 (0–1, 0–2, 2–0)	Russia	Meridian Centre, St. Catharines; Attendance: 797

Game reference

Kateřina Zechovská
Goalies
Valeria Merkusheva
Referee:
(United States) Melissa Szkola
Linesmen:
(United States) Jessica Leclerc
(Canada) Justine Todd

	0–1	06:54 – Kadirova (Beloglazova)
	0–2	24:51 – Vodopyanova (Kadirova) (PP)
	0–3	29:10 – Kadirova (Vodopyanova)
Hymlarová (Patočková) – 47:39	1–3
Patočková (Martinů) – 52:23	2–3

8 min
Penalties
14 min
18
Shots
20

11 January 2016; 19:30	United States	4–1 (2–0, 1–0, 1–1)	Canada	Meridian Centre, St. Catharines; Attendance: 4,016

Game reference

Alex Gulstene
Goalies
Stephanie Neatby
Referee:
(Germany) Michaela Kiefer
Linesmen:
(Sweden) Stina Nilsson
(France) Sueva Torribio Rousselin

Brodt (Wethington, Barnes) (PP) – 05:52	1–0
Gilmore (Barnes) (PP) – 09:34	2–0
Snodgrass (Wente, Gilmore) (PP) – 26:06	3–0
	3–1	56:24 – Edgar (Watts)
Gilmore (Wente) (ENG) – 58:34	4–1

10 min
Penalties
10 min
32
Shots
34

==== Group B ====
Pos	Team	Pld	W	OTW	OTL	L	GF	GA	GD	Pts	Qualification
1	Sweden	3	2	0	0	1	13	4	+9	6 (Note: Sweden 3 Pts, +2 GD; Finland 3 Pts, 0 GD; Switzerland 3 Pts, −2 GD)	Advance to quarterfinals
2	Finland	3	2	0	0	1	14	4	+10	6	Advance to quarterfinals
3	Switzerland	3	2	0	0	1	9	5	+4	6	Advance to relegation round
4	France	3	0	0	0	3	1	24	−23	0	Advance to relegation round

Source: IIHF
Rules for classification: 1) points; 2) head-to-head points; 3) head-to-head goal difference; 4) head-to-head number of goals scored; 5) result against closest best-ranked team outside tied teams; 6) result against second-best ranked team outside tied teams; 7) seeding before tournament.
Notes:

8 January 2016; 12:00	Finland	11–1 (2–0, 5–0, 4–1)	France	Meridian Centre, St. Catharines; Attendance: 3,521

Game reference

Tiia Pajarinen
Goalies
Anaïs Aurard
Victoire Masure
Referee:
(Canada) Brandy Dewar
Linesmen:
(Germany) Lisa Linnek
(Canada) Justine Todd

Melotindos (Nousiainen) – 13:41	1–0
Lehtopelto (Melotindos, Karppinen) – 17:15	2–0
Reinikainen (Melotindos, Karppinen) – 21:02	3–0
Savander (Säkkinen, Nieminen) – 25:18	4–0
Nylund (Säkkinen) – 28:50	5–0
Nieminen (Säkkinen, Nylund) – 32:02	6–0
Karjalainen (Säkkinen, Nylund) – 38:57	7–0
Nieminen (Nylund) – 40:40	8–0
Nousiainen – 40:56	9–0
	9–1	46:00 – C. Aurard (Huguet)
Reinikainen (Lehtopelto) (SH) – 47:34	10–1
Nylund (Nieminen) (PP) – 59:15	11–1

8 min
Penalties
8 min
55
Shots
7

8 January 2016; 14:00	Sweden	5–1 (3–0, 1–0, 1–1)	Switzerland	Seymour-Hannah Centre, St. Catharines; Attendance: 471

Game reference

Emma Söderberg
Goalies
Vanessa Bolinger
Referee:
(France) Marie Picavet
Linesmen:
(Germany) Daniela Kiefer
(United States) Jessica Leclerc

Hjalmarsson (Wernblom) – 12:11	1–0
Lundin (Adolfsson, Nikula) – 14:07	2–0
af Bjur (Neunzert, Nylén Persson) (PP2) – 18:27	3–0
af Bjur (Tedenby, Johansson) – 31:52	4–0
	4–1	53:59 – Müller (Rüedi)
Lundin (Nylén Persson, Tedenby) – 56:29	5–1

4 min
Penalties
10 min
31
Shots
20

9 January 2016; 12:00	Switzerland	2–0 (0–0, 1–0, 1–0)	Finland	Meridian Centre, St. Catharines; Attendance: 578

Game reference
Vanessa Bolinger	Goalies	Johanna Oksman	Referee: (Germany) Michaela Kiefer; Linesmen: (Sweden) Stina Nilsson (Canada) Justine Todd
Quennec (Enzler) – 35:42 / 1–0; Müller (Zimmermann) – 53:57 / 2–0			Referee: (Germany) Michaela Kiefer; Linesmen: (Sweden) Stina Nilsson (Canada) Justine Todd
12 min	Penalties	2 min	Referee: (Germany) Michaela Kiefer; Linesmen: (Sweden) Stina Nilsson (Canada) Justine Todd
17	Shots	19	Referee: (Germany) Michaela Kiefer; Linesmen: (Sweden) Stina Nilsson (Canada) Justine Todd

9 January 2016; 14:00	Sweden	7–0 (2–0, 3–0, 2–0)	France	Seymour-Hannah Centre, St. Catharines; Attendance: 406

Game reference

Ellen Jonsson
Goalies
Victoire Masure
Referee:
(Finland) Kaisa Ketonen
Linesmen:
(Canada) Danielle McGurry
(Norway) Anne Nygård

Armborg (Hjalmarsson, Berglund) – 00:51	1–0
Tedenby (El-Mahmadi) – 16:49	2–0
Murén (Lundin, Nylén Persson) – 30:29	3–0
Hjalmarsson (Adolfsson) – 32:28	4–0
Lundin (Muren, Johansson) – 36:11	5–0
Muren (Lundin) – 41:04	6–0
Johansson (Adolfsson) – 43:33	7–0

10 min
Penalties
4 min
49
Shots
13

11 January 2016; 12:00	Finland	3–1 (1–0, 1–1, 1–0)	Sweden	Meridian Centre, St. Catharines; Attendance: 2,635

Game reference
Tiia Pajarinen	Goalies	Emma Söderberg	Referee: (Canada) Lisa Grison; Linesmen: (Austria) Bettina Angerer (Norway) Anna Nygård
Nieminen (Nylund, Karppinen) – 18:45; Karppinen (Klemola) – 37:47; Nieminen (Melotindos) – 52:06 / Goals / 27:44 – Adolfsson (Hjalmarsson, Johansson)			Referee: (Canada) Lisa Grison; Linesmen: (Austria) Bettina Angerer (Norway) Anna Nygård
8 min	Penalties	6 min	Referee: (Canada) Lisa Grison; Linesmen: (Austria) Bettina Angerer (Norway) Anna Nygård
18	Shots	21	Referee: (Canada) Lisa Grison; Linesmen: (Austria) Bettina Angerer (Norway) Anna Nygård

11 January 2016; 14:00	Switzerland	6–0 (1–0, 3–0, 2–0)	France	Seymour-Hannah Centre, St. Catharines; Attendance: 211

Game reference

Vanessa Bolinger
Chiara Pfosi
Goalies
Anaïs Aurard
Victoire Masure
Referee:
(Finland) Kaisa Ketonen
Linesmen:
(Germany) Daniela Kiefer
(Germany) Lisa Linnek

Sigrist (Rüedi, Müller) (PP) – 12:13	1–0
Ryhner (Zimmermann) – 21:48	2–0
Müller (Berta, Quennec) – 22:27	3–0
Müller (Sigrist, Rüedi) (PP) – 31:13	4–0
Bachmann (Enzler, Weiss) – 45:50	5–0
Müller (Gremaud) – 54:12	6–0

4 min
Penalties
14 min
49
Shots
7

=== Relegation round ===
The third and fourth placed team from Group B played a best-of-three series to determine the relegated team.

12 January 2016; 12:00	Switzerland	5–1 (2–1, 0–0, 3–0)	France	Meridian Centre, St. Catharines; Attendance: 224

Game reference

Vanessa Bolinger
Goalies
Anaïs Aurard
Referee:
(Germany) Michaela Kiefer
Linesmen:
(Germany) Daniela Kiefer
(Sweden) Stina Nilsson

Berta (Enzler) – 10:02	1–0
Rüedi (Müller, Berta) (PP) – 16:53	2–0
	2–1	18:02 – Verney (C. Aurard)
Müller (Allemann) – 45:57	3–1
Müller (Bachmann, Enzler) – 47:58	4–1
Schlegel (Enzler, Quennec) (PP) – 57:19	5–1

8 min
Penalties
12 min
30
Shots
5

14 January 2016; 12:00	France	0–2 (0–1, 0–0, 0–1)	Switzerland	Meridian Centre, St. Catharines; Attendance: 537

Game reference
Anaïs Aurard	Goalies	Vanessa Bolinger	Referee: (Canada) Lisa Grison; Linesmen: (Sweden) Stina Nilsson (Norway) Anna Nygård
0–1 / 10:16 – Schlegel (Enzler, Quennec) (PP); 0–2 / 42:42 – Enzler (Rüedi) (SH)			Referee: (Canada) Lisa Grison; Linesmen: (Sweden) Stina Nilsson (Norway) Anna Nygård
8 min	Penalties	10 min	Referee: (Canada) Lisa Grison; Linesmen: (Sweden) Stina Nilsson (Norway) Anna Nygård
9	Shots	40	Referee: (Canada) Lisa Grison; Linesmen: (Sweden) Stina Nilsson (Norway) Anna Nygård

=== Final round ===
==== Bracket ====
Quarterfinals
A4	Czech Republic	2
B1	Sweden	3
A3	Russia	3
B2	Finland	0

Semifinals
A1	United States	4
B1	Sweden	0
A2	Canada	4
A3	Russia	0

Final
A1	United States	3
A2	Canada	2
Third place
B1	Sweden	2
A3	Russia	1

==== Quarterfinals ====
12 January 2016; 16:00	Czech Republic	2–3 (0–0, 2–1, 0–2)	Sweden	Meridian Centre, St. Catharines; Attendance: 444

Game reference

Kateřina Zechovská
Goalies
Emma Söderberg
Referee:
(Finland) Kaisa Ketonen
Linesmen:
(Austria) Bettina Angerer
(Germany) Lisa Linnek

Hymlárová (Bucifalová, Volkánová) (PP) – 29:48	1–0
	1–1	32:19 – Tedenby (Andersson)
Bucifalová (Hymlárová) – 35:02	2–1
	2–2	41:26 – Murén (Adolfsson)
	2–3	49:03 – Tedenby (Olsson, Adolfsson) (PP)

6 min
Penalties
16 min
39
Shots
17

12 January 2016; 19:30	Russia	3–0 (1–0, 0–0, 2–0)	Finland	Meridian Centre, St. Catharines; Attendance: 1011

Game reference

Valeria Tarakanova
Goalies
Tiia Pajarinen
Referee:
(Canada) Lisa Grison
Linesmen:
(Canada) Danielle McGurry
(France) Sueva Torribio Rousselin

Beloglazova (Pirogova, Vodopyanova) (PP) – 7:50	1–0
Kadirova (Beloglazova) (ENG) – 57:58	2–0
Beloglazova – 58:10	3–0

6 min
Penalties
12 min
33
Shots
17

==== Semifinals ====
14 January 2016; 16:00	United States	4–0 (1–0, 2–0, 1–0)	Sweden	Meridian Centre, St. Catharines; Attendance: 711

Game reference
Beth Larcom	Goalies	Ellen Jonsson	Referee: (Canada) Brandy Dewar; Linesmen: (Germany) Daniela Kiefer (Canada) Justine Todd
Heising – 6:24; Brodt (SH) – 33:10; Oden (Compher, Heising) – 39:50; Heise (Zumwinkle, Barnes) – 46:30 / Goals			Referee: (Canada) Brandy Dewar; Linesmen: (Germany) Daniela Kiefer (Canada) Justine Todd
4 min	Penalties	10 min	Referee: (Canada) Brandy Dewar; Linesmen: (Germany) Daniela Kiefer (Canada) Justine Todd
43	Shots	9	Referee: (Canada) Brandy Dewar; Linesmen: (Germany) Daniela Kiefer (Canada) Justine Todd

14 January 2016; 19:30	Canada	4–0 (1–0, 1–0, 2–0)	Russia	Meridian Centre, St. Catharines; Attendance: 2,819

Game reference

Édith D'Astous Moreau
Goalies
Valeria Tarakanova
Valeria Merkusheva
Referee:
(United States) Melissa Szkola
Linesmen:
(Austria) Bettina Angerer
(United States) Jessica Leclerc

Bell (Maltais, Cross) – 9:55	1–0
Houston (Maltais, Agnew) (PP) – 21:46	2–0
Bell (O'Neill) – 42:31	3–0
Friesen (Frappier) – 42:56	4–0

4 min
Penalties
8 min
43
Shots
12

==== Fifth place game ====
14 January 2016; 12:00	Czech Republic	3–1 (1–0, 1–0, 1–1)	Finland	Seymour-Hannah Centre, St. Catharines; Attendance: 187

Game reference

Kateřina Zechovská
Goalies
Johanna Oksman
Referee:
(France) Marie Picavet
Linesmen:
(Canada) Danielle McGurry
(France) Sueva Torribio Rousselin

Smetková (Zedníková, Erbenová) (PP) – 09:09	1–0
Smetková (Neubauerová) – 34:26	2–0
Jůzková (Topolská) – 47:30	3–0
	3–1	54:27 – Sahlstrom (Klemola, Melotindos)

4 min
Penalties
2 min
24
Shots
29

==== Bronze medal game ====
15 January 2016; 16:00	Russia	1–2 (0–2, 0–0, 1–0)	Sweden	Meridian Centre, St. Catharines; Attendance: 1,192

Game reference

Valeria Tarakanova
Goalies
Emma Söderberg
Referee:
(United States) Melissa Szkola
Linesmen:
(United States) Jessica Leclerc
(Canada) Justine Todd

	0–1	05:01 – Tedenby (PP)
	0–2	13:03 – Hjalmarsson
Beloglazova (Kadirova) – 55:33	1–2

10 min
Penalties
4 min
27
Shots
32

==== Gold medal game ====
15 January 2016; 19:30	United States	3–2 OT (0–1, 1–1, 1–0) (OT: 1–0)	Canada	Meridian Centre, St. Catharines; Attendance: 5,516

Game reference

Alex Gulstene
Goalies
Stephanie Neatby
Referee:
(France) Marie Picavet
Linesmen:
(Austria) Bettina Angerer
(Germany) Lisa Linnek

	0–1	17:55 – Bourbonnais
	0–2	25:58 – Watts
Woken – 35:00	1–2
Snodgrass – 48:03	2–2
Snodgrass (Barnes, Wethington) – 61:47	3–2

2 min
Penalties
8 min
29
Shots
23

=== Final rankings ===
Pos	Grp	Team	Pld	W	OTW	OTL	L	GF	GA	GD	Pts	Final result
1	A	United States	5	4	1	0	0	23	3	+20	14	Champions
2	A	Canada (H)	5	3	0	1	1	23	9	+14	10	Runners-up
3	B	Sweden	6	4	0	0	2	18	11	+7	12	Third place
4	A	Russia	6	2	0	0	4	9	19	−10	6	Fourth place
5	A	Czech Republic	5	1	0	0	4	7	24	−17	3	Fifth place game
6	B	Finland	5	2	0	0	3	15	10	+5	6	Fifth place game
7	B	Switzerland	5	4	0	0	1	16	6	+10	12	Win Relegation game
8	B	France	5	0	0	0	5	2	31	−29	0	Relegation to Division I A

Source: https://www.iihf.com/en/events/2016/ww18/standings/playoffs
(H) Host

=== Tournament awards ===
==== Best players selected by the directorate ====
Best Goalkeeper	(Sweden) Emma Söderberg
Best Defenseman	(United States) Cayla Barnes
Best Forward	(Switzerland) Alina Müller

Source: IIHF

==== Media All Stars ====
Goalkeeper	(Sweden) Emma Söderberg
Defenceman	(United States) Cayla Barnes
Defenceman	(Sweden) Jessica Adolfsson
Forward	(Russia) Fanuza Kadirova
Forward	(Canada) Ashton Bell
Forward	(Switzerland) Alina Müller
Most Valuable Player	(Russia) Valeria Tarakanova

Source: IIHF

=== Statistics ===
==== Scoring leaders ====
Pos	Player	Country	GP	G	A	Pts	+/−	PIM
1	Alina Müller	Switzerland	5	7	2	9	+5	10
2	Natalie Snodgrass	United States	5	6	1	7	+8	6
3	Fanuza Kadirova	Russia	6	5	2	7	+1	0
4	Rahel Enzler	Switzerland	5	1	6	7	+4	0
5	Jessica Adolfsson	Sweden	6	1	6	7	+2	6
6	Rebecca Gilmore	United States	5	4	2	6	+6	0
6	Petra Nieminen	Finland	5	4	2	6	+4	2
8	Celine Tedenby	Sweden	6	4	2	6	+2	6
9	Ashton Bell	Canada	5	3	3	6	+6	0
10	Jenniina Nylund	Finland	5	2	4	6	+2	4

GP = Games played; G = Goals; A = Assists; Pts = Points; +/− = P Plus–minus; PIM = Penalties In Minutes
Source: IIHF

==== Goaltending leaders ====
(minimum 40% team's total ice time)

Pos	Player	Country	TOI	GA	GAA	Sv%	SO
1	Alex Gulstene	United States	181:47	3	0.99	95.45	1
2	Tiia Pajarinen	Finland	179:36	4	1.34	93.33	0
3	Emma Söderberg	Sweden	240:00	7	1.75	93.27	0
4	Vanessa Bolinger	Switzerland	279:36	6	1.29	91.04	2
5	Valeria Tarakanova	Russia	288:40	14	2.91	90.07	1

TOI = Time on ice (minutes:seconds); GA = Goals against; GAA = Goals against average; Sv% = Save percentage; SO = Shutouts
Source: IIHF

== Division I ==
=== Group ===
The Division I tournament was played in Miskolc, Hungary during 10 to 16 January 2016.

Team	Pld	W	OTW	OTL	L	GF	GA	GD	Pts	Promotion or relegation
Japan	5	5	0	0	0	18	2	+16	15	Promoted to 2017 Top Division
Germany	5	3	1	0	1	19	8	+11	11	
Slovakia	5	3	0	1	1	18	9	+9	10	
Norway	5	2	0	0	3	14	12	+2	6	
Hungary (H)	5	1	0	0	4	4	24	−20	3	
Denmark	5	0	0	0	5	2	20	−18	0	Relegated to 2017 Division I Group B

Source: IIHF
(H) Host

=== Division I Qualification ===
The Division I Qualification tournament was played in Spittal an der Drau and Radenthein, Austria during 7 to 11 January 2016. The teams were divided into two groups of four where the winners played off against each other for promotion to the 2017 Division I Group A tournament. The teams ranking second through sixth remained in the newly titled Division I Group B and were joined by the relegated team from the 2016 Division I tournament. As the lowest ranking teams, Romania and Australia were relegated to the new Division I Group B Qualification tournament.

Austria won the tournament and gained promotion to the 2017 Division I Group A tournament.

Group A

Team	Pld	W	OTW	OTL	L	GF	GA	GD	Pts
Austria	3	3	0	0	0	20	1	+19	9
Kazakhstan	3	2	0	0	1	20	7	+13	6
China	3	1	0	0	2	12	11	+1	3
Romania	3	0	0	0	3	3	36	−33	0

Source: IIHF

Group B

Team	Pld	W	OTW	OTL	L	GF	GA	GD	Pts
Italy	3	3	0	0	0	15	3	+12	9
Great Britain	3	2	0	0	1	7	6	+1	6
Poland	3	1	0	0	2	14	7	+7	3
Australia	3	0	0	0	3	2	22	−20	0

Source: IIHF
