= Olivia Knowles =

Canadian ice hockey player (born 1999)

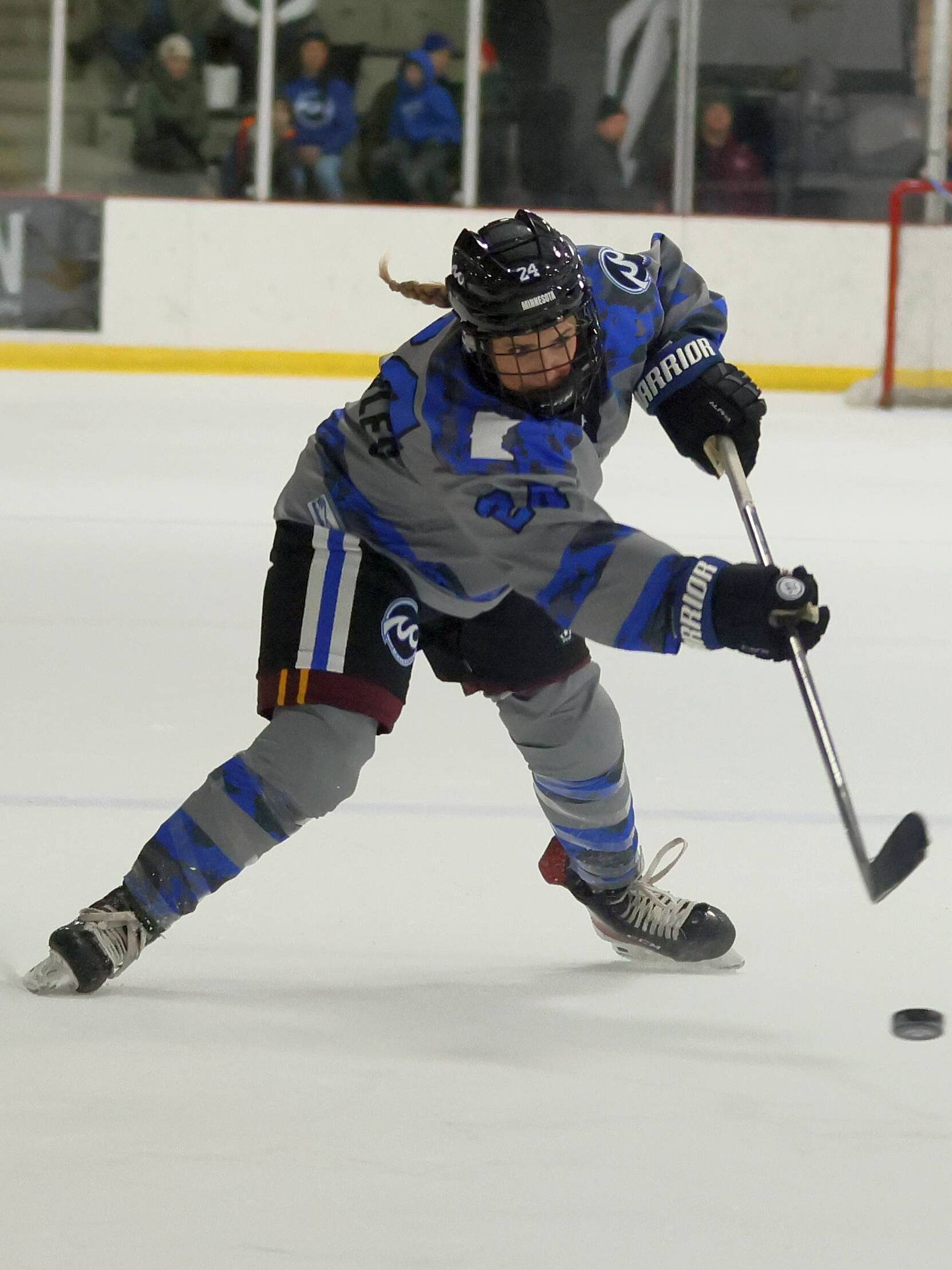
- Knowles with the Minnesota Whitecaps in 2022
- Born: January 24, 1999 (age 27) Campbell River, British Columbia, Canada
- Height: 5 ft 9 in (175 cm)
- Position: Defence
- Shoots: Right
- PWHL team Former teams: New York Sirens; PWHL Toronto; Minnesota Whitecaps
Medal record
Representing Canada
Women's ice hockey
World U18 Championships
Silver medal – second place	2016 Canada
Silver medal – second place	2017 Czech Republic

Olivia Knowles (born January 24, 1999) is a Canadian professional ice hockey player who is a defenceman for the New York Sirens of the Professional Women's Hockey League (PWHL). She played college ice hockey at the University of Minnesota.

== Early life ==
Knowles was born in Campbell River, British Columbia, Canada, to Darrell and Jonelle Knowles. She has one sibling named Jaret. She attended Penticton Secondary in Penticton, BC, and graduated in 2017. She has a cousin named Lisa Lloyd, who played ice hockey at the University of Alberta.

Throughout her life, she has competed in gymnastics, soccer, softball, track & field, swimming, basketball, volleyball, cross country, skiing, snowboarding, surfing, and tennis.

While in high school, she played at Okanagan Hockey Academy (OHA) under coaches Jim Fetter and Delaney Collins. She was a member of the Junior Women's Hockey League (JWHL) First Team All-Star.

In 2016, she was named the Canadian Sport School Hockey League (CSSHL) Best Defense and the OHA Female Prep Best Defence. In 2017, she was team captain and led her team to win the CSSHL championship, scoring 30 points in 42 games (8 goals, 22 assists).

== Playing career ==
=== College ===
Knowles played in five seasons at the University of Minnesota, from 2017 to 2022. By the end of her fifth year, she was team co-captain and a Western Collegiate Hockey Association (WCHA) Scholar-Athlete. She was also named to the WCHA All-Academic Team and an Academic All-Big Ten honouree.

During the 2017–18 season, in her freshman year, she played in all 38 games and scored seven goals and 13 assists. She ranked second on the team with 62 blocked shots and fourth with a +16 plus/minus rating. She was named to the WCHA All-Rookie Team and the All-US College Hockey Online (USCHO) Rookie Team. During the 2018–19 season, in her sophomore year, she recorded four goals and nine assists in 37 games. She was second on the team with 61 blocks and tied for third among all WCHA defence with four goals. With her team, she debuted for the first time in the NCAA Frozen Four.

During the 2019–20 season, in her junior year, she played in all 36 games and recorded three goals and 15 assists. She led the WCHA defence with a +35 plus/minus rating and tied for fifth on the team with 37 blocked shots. She was WCHA Defender of the Week for the week of September 28 and was named American Hockey Coaches Association (AHCA) All-American Scholar, Big Ten Distinguished Scholar, WCHA All-Academic, and Academic All-Big Ten honouree. During the 2020–21 season, in her senior year, she was team assistant captain and appeared in all 20 games. She recorded four goals and five assists, and led the team with 33 blocked shots and was seventh among WCHA defence with nine points. She was named WCHA Scholar-Athlete, WCHA All-Academic Team, and Academic All-Big Ten honouree that season.

During the 2021–22 season, in her fifth year, Knowles was team co-captain and finished the season as program leader in the number of games played with 168. She was first on the team with 76 blocked shots and had a career-high 16 assists.

=== Professional ===
Knowles signed a two-year contract with the Minnesota Whitecaps in 2022. She and the team played in the Isobel Cup finals, where they lost to the Toronto Six. She had one assist and five blocked shots in the run leading up to the finals.

Knowles was drafted in the 15th round, 86th overall, by PWHL Toronto in the 2023 PWHL Draft.

During the 2023–24 PWHL season, she helped the team secure a spot in the PWHL playoffs after beating PWHL Montreal 3–2 in April.

After starting the 2024-25 season on Toronto's reserve roster, Knowles was signed by the New York Sirens on December 6, 2024, after Ella Shelton was placed on injured reserve.

== International play ==
Knowles was a member of Canada women's national under-18 ice hockey team. She helped the team earn a silver medal at the 2016 and 2017 IIHF World Women's U18 Championship. She was assistant captain of the U18 team at the 2016 World Championships.

== Personal life ==
Knowles has degrees in sport management and journalism from the University of Minnesota. She is a fan of the Vancouver Canucks.

== Career statistics ==
=== Regular season and playoffs ===
			Regular season					Playoffs
Season	Team	League	GP	G	A	Pts	PIM	GP	G	A	Pts	PIM
2023–24	PWHL Toronto	PWHL	20	0	1	1	6	5	0	0	0	2
2024–25	New York Sirens	PWHL	12	0	0	0	0	—	—	—	—	—
2025–26	New York Sirens	PWHL	3	0	0	0	0	—	—	—	—	—
PWHL totals			35	0	1	1	6	5	0	0	0	2
