= Sydney Brodt =

American ice hockey player (born 1998)

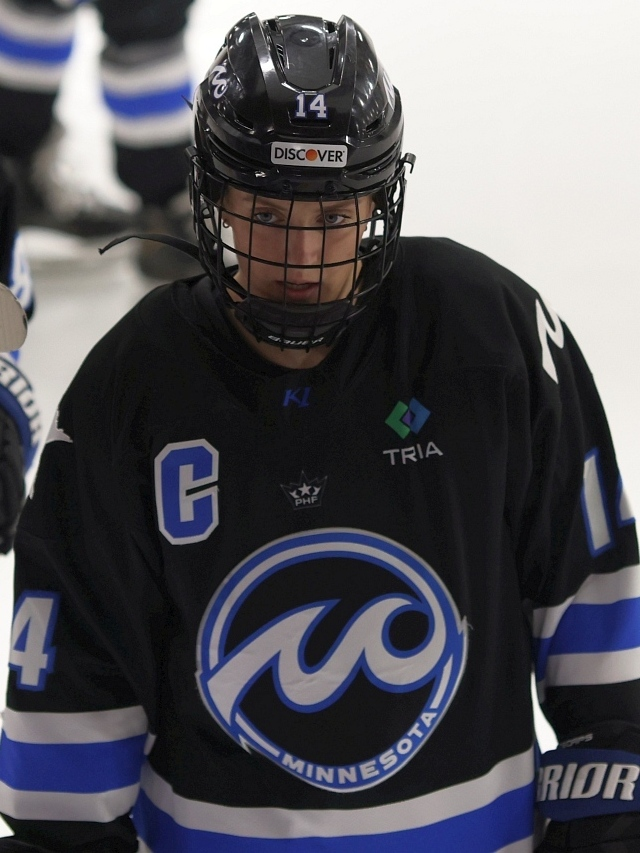
- Brodt with the Minnesota Whitecaps in 2023
- Born: May 3, 1998 (age 28) North Oaks, Minnesota, US
- Height: 5 ft 6 in (168 cm)
- Weight: 141 lb (64 kg; 10 st 1 lb)
- Position: Forward
- Shoots: Right
- SDHL team Former teams: Frölunda HC: Minnesota Frost; Minnesota Whitecaps; Linköping HC; PWHPA Minnesota; Minnesota Duluth Bulldogs
- National team: United States
- Playing career: 2016–present
Medal record
World Championship
Gold medal – first place	2019 Finland

Sydney Jane Brodt (born May 3, 1998) is an American ice hockey player. She has played with Frölunda HC in the Swedish Women's Hockey League (SDHL) since December 2024. As a member of the United States national team, she won a gold medal at the 2019 IIHF Women's World Championship.

== Playing career ==
Brodt attended Mounds View High School, where she was named a Ms. Hockey Minnesota finalist in 2016.

=== NCAA ===
Across four years with the Minnesota Duluth Bulldogs women's ice hockey program, Brodt scored 98 points in 141 games. She was the second player in Bulldogs' history to serve as captain for three seasons. After graduating, she joined the Professional Women's Hockey Players Association (PWHPA) for the 2020–21 season.

=== PWHPA ===
Skating for Team Minnesota during the 2020–21 PWHPA season, Brodt participated in a PWHPA Dream Gap Tour event at New York's Madison Square Garden on February 28, 2021, the first women's ice hockey event at the venue. Playing for a team sponsored by Adidas, she was called for a penalty in the third period.

=== PHF ===
Brodt joined the Minnesota Whitecaps of the Premier Hockey Federation (PHF) for the 2022-23 season. She was named the team's captain and lead them to a spot in the Isobel Cup finals, where they lost to the Toronto Six.

=== PWHL ===
Brodt was drafted in the 15th round of the 2023 PWHL Draft by Minnesota. With Minnesota, she won the Walter Cup in the inaugural season of the Professional Women's Hockey League (PWHL). She suffered an injury during the team's first preseason game against Ottawa, and began the season on Minnesota's long-term injured reserve.

== International play ==
Brodt represented the United States at the 2016 IIHF World Women's U18 Championship, winning gold. She made her senior team debut at the 2018 4 Nations Cup and played for the U.S. at the 2019 IIHF Women's World Championship.

== Personal life ==
Brodt has a degree in finance from the University of Minnesota Duluth.

== Career statistics ==
=== Regular season and playoffs ===
Note: GP = Games played; G = Goals; A = Assists; Pts = Points; PIM = Penalty minutes;

			Regular season					Playoffs
Season	Team	League	GP	G	A	Pts	PIM	GP	G	A	Pts	PIM
2016–17	Minnesota Duluth Bulldogs	WCHA	35	8	13	21	8	—	—	—	—	—
2017–18	Minnesota Duluth Bulldogs	WCHA	35	5	11	16	4	—	—	—	—	—
2018–19	Minnesota Duluth Bulldogs	WCHA	35	8	12	20	6	—	—	—	—	—
2019–20	Minnesota Duluth Bulldogs	WCHA	36	19	22	41	16	—	—	—	—	—
2020–21	Team Minnesota	PWHPA	6	3	1	4	4	—	—	—	—	—
2021–22	Lonköping HC	SDHL	36	29	27	56	22	7	2	2	4	8
2022–23	Minnesota Whitecaps	PHF	21	5	4	9	17	3	1	0	1	2
2023–24	PWHL Minnesota	PWHL	7	0	1	1	2	10	1	1	2	0
2024–25	Frölunda HC	SDHL	12	5	9	14	6	11	2	7	9	0
NCAA totals			141	40	58	98	34	—	—	—	—	—
PWHPA totals			6	3	1	4	4	—	—	—	—	—
SDHL totals			48	34	36	70	28	18	4	9	13	8
PHF totals			21	5	4	9	17	3	1	0	1	2
PWHL totals			7	0	1	1	2	10	1	1	2	0

=== International ===
Year	Team	Event	Result	GP	G	A	Pts	PIM
2016	United States	U18	1st place, gold medalist(s)	5	3	1	4	0
2019	United States	WC	1st place, gold medalist(s)	7	0	2	2	2
Junior totals				5	3	1	4	0
Senior totals				7	0	2	2	2
