= Celine Tedenby =

Swedish ice hockey player

- Born: 15 June 1999 (age 27) Örnsköldsvik, Sweden
- Height: 168 cm (5 ft 6 in)
- Position: Centre
- Shoots: Left
- SDHL team Former teams: Brynäs IF: Merrimack Warriors; Maine Black Bears; MODO Hockey
- National team: Sweden
- Playing career: 2014–present

Celine Tedenby (born 15 June 1999) is a Swedish ice hockey player and member of the Swedish national team. She is signed in the Swedish Women's Hockey League (SDHL) with Brynäs IF on a 1+1 contract through the 2025–26 season.

She represented Sweden at the 2022 IIHF Women's World Championship.

== Playing career ==
As a child, Tedenby developed in the minor ice hockey department of Jarveds IF in her hometown of Örnsköldsvik, on the east coast of Sweden in the north-central historical province of Ångermanland. She attended the NIU hockeygymnasium (Note: A hockeygymnasium or ishockeygymnasium is a program created in partnership between a gymnasieskola and an elite ice hockey club that allows students to focus on developing their ice hockey abilities while completing their secondary education. The highest level of hockeygymnasiet designation is Nationellt Idrottsutbildning (lit. 'National Sports Education') or NIU. NIU hockeygymnasier are certified by the Swedish Ice Hockey Association as meeting requirements necessary to consistently produce players who, at a minimum, reach the elite senior national level. NIU programs are free to attend but limited to 14 students or fewer per year, who are selected on the basis of grades and ice hockey ability.) of Örnsköldsvik Gymnasium and MODO Hockey, which is known for having produced a number of successful players, including icons of Swedish ice hockey Peter Forsberg, Victor Hedman, Maria Lindh, Emma Nordin, and Daniel and Henrik Sedin.

Her debut in the premier senior national league, the Riksserien (called Swedish Women's Hockey League since 2016), was made with MODO Hockey Dam in the 2014–15 season, at age fifteen. Playing with MODO, Tedenby steadily improved season-over-season from 7 points (6 goals+1 assists) in 27 games as a rookie in 2014–15 to 13 points (9+4) in 35 games in 2015–16, 22 points (15+7) in 34 games in 2016–17, and 26 points (15+11) in 36 games in 2017–18, her final season with the club.

=== NCAA ===
Tedenby relocated to the United States in 2018 to began her college ice hockey career with the Maine Black Bears women's ice hockey program in the Hockey East conference of the NCAA Division I. As a freshman, she was twice named the Hockey East Rookie of the Week and was selected as the NCAA Third Star of the Week after tallying 5 points (3+2) in a weekend doubleheader against Dartmouth in November. She finished the 2018–19 season as the Black Bears' top point earner.

Presented with the opportunity to play a fifth year of NCAA college eligibility due to the COVID-19 pandemic, Tedenby joined the Merrimack Warriors women's ice hockey program, also in the Hockey East conference, for the 2022–23 season.

== International play ==
As a member of the Swedish national under-18 team, Tedenby participated in the IIHF U18 Women's World Championship tournaments in 2015, 2016, and 2017. She was Sweden's highest goal scorer at the 2016 tournament, contributing to the team's bronze medal victory.

She made her IIHF Women's World Championship debut with the Swedish national team in 2022, recording an assist in six games played.

== Personal life ==
Tedenby holds a bachelor's degree in social work from the University of Maine and, as of September 2022, is pursuing a Master of Public Affairs degree at Merrimack College in North Andover, Massachusetts.

Her cousin, Mattias Tedenby, is also an ice hockey player. He was drafted by the New Jersey Devils in the 2008 NHL entry draft and has played most of his career with HV71 in the Swedish Hockey League.

== Career statistics ==
=== Regular season and playoffs ===
			Regular season					Playoffs
Season	Team	League	GP	G	A	Pts	PIM	GP	G	A	Pts	PIM
2012-13	MODO Hockey 2	Div.1	7	1	3	4	0	–	–	–	–	–
2013-14	MODO Hockey 2	Div.1	11	7	8	15	36	–	–	–	–	–
2014-15	MODO Hockey	Riksserien	27	6	1	7	22	5	1	0	1	0
2015-16	MODO Hockey	Riksserien	35	9	4	13	12	3	0	2	2	0
2016-17	MODO Hockey	SDHL	34	15	7	22	34	2	0	0	0	6
2017-18	MODO Hockey	SDHL	36	15	11	26	36	5	0	2	2	6
2017-18	MODO Hockey 2	Div.1	7	7	1	8	30	–	–	–	–	–
2018-19	Maine Black Bears	NCAA	31	12	14	26	38	–	–	–	–	–
2019-20	Maine Black Bears	NCAA	31	10	5	15	30	–	–	–	–	–
2020-21	Maine Black Bears	NCAA	18	2	4	6	12	–	–	–	–	–
2021-22	Maine Black Bears	NCAA	26	7	10	17	16	–	–	–	–	–
SDHL totals			132	45	23	68	5	15	1	4	5	12
NCAA totals			106	31	33	64	96	–	–	–	–	–

=== International ===
Year	Team	Event	Result	GP	G	A	Pts	PIM
2015	Sweden U18	WW18	6th	5	1	1	2	2
2016	Sweden U18	WW18	3rd place, bronze medalist(s)	6	4	2	6	6
2017	Sweden U18	WW18	4th	5	0	1	1	8
2022	Sweden	WW	7th	6	0	1	1	0
Junior totals				16	5	4	9	16
