= Becca Gilmore =

American ice hockey player

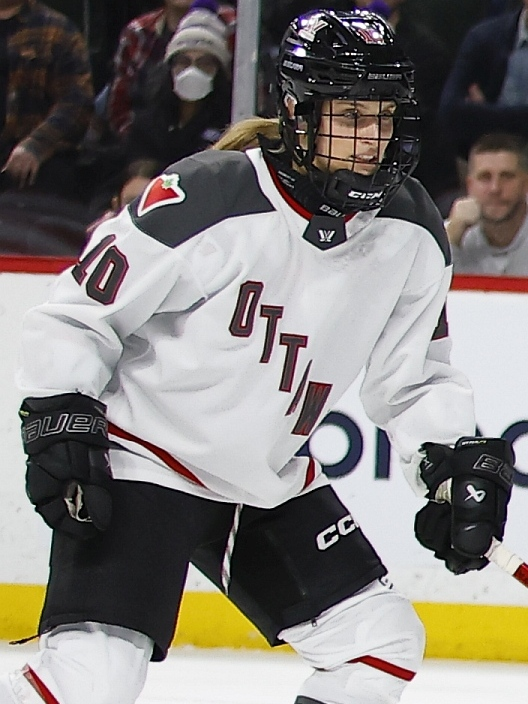
- Gilmore with PWHL Ottawa in 2024
- Born: February 15, 1998 (age 28) Wayland, Massachusetts, US
- Height: 5 ft 6 in (168 cm)
- Weight: 145 lb (66 kg; 10 st 5 lb)
- Position: Centre
- Shot: Right
- Played for: Boston Pride; PWHL Ottawa
- National team: United States
- Playing career: 2017–2024
Medal record
World Championship
Gold medal – first place	2023 Canada

Rebecca Gilmore (born February 15, 1998) is an American former ice hockey forward. She played professionally for the Boston Pride of the Premier Hockey Federation (PHF) and PWHL Ottawa of the Professional Women's Hockey League (PWHL). She played college ice hockey at Harvard from 2017 to 2022.

== Playing career ==
Gilmore attended the Noble and Greenough School in Dedham, Massachusetts for secondary school and played with the school's girls' ice hockey team. In 2017, she won the John Carlton Memorial Award and was also named to the Boston Herald All-Scholastic.

In the fall of 2017, she joined the women's ice hockey program of Harvard University. Gilmore notched two assists in her first NCAA games, going on to finish her rookie season with 35 points in 31 games, leading Harvard in scoring and being named to the ECAC All-Rookie Team. Her point production dropped slightly during her second year, down to 21 points in 26 games, as she missed part of the season due to injury. She would then score 24 points in 33 games during the 2019–20 season, including the game-winning goal to send Harvard to the ECAC Hockey semifinals for the first time since 2015. She was named ECAC Player of the Week for the last week of February 2020.

=== Professional ===
Gilmore signed her first professional contract with the Boston Pride ahead of the 2022–23 PHF season. Her first PHF goal was scored off a wrist shot against Toronto Six goaltender Elaine Chuli on November 26, 2022.

During the 2023–24 season she recorded three assists in 22 games for PWHL Ottawa. On June 16, 2024, Gilmore announced her retirement.

== International career ==
As a member of the US national under-18 ice hockey team, Gilmore participated in the IIHF Women's U18 World Championships in 2014, 2015, and 2016, scoring a total of 19 points in 15 games and winning gold twice and silver once. She finished as the tournament's second-ranked scorer in 2015 after tying the scoring leader, Canada's Sarah Potomak, in points, with nine, but trailing her in goals scored, with two to Potomak's five. As of 2021, she ranks seventh on the list of all-time career points scored by an American in the IIHF U18 Women's World Championship.

She was the only PHF player selected to represent the United States in the 2022 Rivalry Series showcase between the national teams of Canada and the United States in Pittsburgh, Pennsylvania during November 2022.
