= Kateřina Zechovská =

Czech ice hockey player

- Born: 4 November 1998 (age 27) Teplice, Czech Republic
- Height: 1.65 m (5 ft 5 in)
- Weight: 78 kg (172 lb; 12 st 4 lb)
- Position: Goaltender
- Catches: Right
- Extraliga team: 2. liga team; Former teams: HC Baník Příbram; HC Draci Bílina; HTI Stars; HC Litvínov
- National team: Czech Republic
- Playing career: 2017–present
Medal record
Representing Czech Republic
Women's ice hockey
World Championship
Bronze medal – third place	2023 Canada	Ice hockey
World University Games
Bronze medal – third place	2023 Lake Placid	Ice hockey
Women's ball hockey
World Championship
Silver medal – second place	2022 Canada	Ball hockey

Kateřina Zechovská (born 4 November 1998) is a Czech ice hockey goaltender for HC Baník Příbram of the Czech Women's Extraliga, and a member of the Czech Republic women's national ice hockey team. She previously played for HC Draci Bílina of the Czech 2. liga.

== International play ==
As a junior player with the Czech Republic women's national under-18 ice hockey team, she participated in the IIHF Women's U18 World Championships in 2014, 2015, and 2016.

Zechovská represented the Czech Republic at the IIHF World Women's Championships in 2019, 2021 and 2023.
