= Erika Grahm =

Swedish ice hockey player

- Born: 26 January 1991 (age 35) Kramfors, Sweden
- Height: 1.74 m (5 ft 9 in)
- Weight: 75 kg (165 lb; 11 st 11 lb)
- Position: Forward
- Shot: Left
- Played for: Modo Hockey; Brynäs IF
- National team: Sweden
- Playing career: 2006–2021

Erika Maria Grahm (born 26 January 1991) is a Swedish retired ice hockey forward and current general manager of Brynäs IF Dam in the Swedish Women's Hockey League (SDHL). During her playing career, she was a two-time Olympian with the Swedish national ice hockey team. She is the fourth highest scorer in the history of the SDHL and all-time leading scorer for Modo Hockey, who she captained from 2010 until her departure in 2018.

== Playing career ==
=== Modo Hockey ===
Having grown up a Modo fan in Kramfors, Grahm joined the organisation in 2005 at the age of 14.

On 8 June 2011, it was announced that Grahm and Swedish national teammate, Tina Enstrom, would join the University of Minnesota–Duluth Bulldogs for the 2011–12 Minnesota–Duluth Bulldogs women's ice hockey season. However, she never attended UMD.

In July 2015, she became the first women's hockey player to be added to the database of the hockey statistics website Elite Prospects.

She missed the large parts of the 2015–16 SDHL season, including the entire playoffs, after suffering a series of injuries, including a pinched nerve at beginning of the season and breaking her foot in the latter half. She was still able to put up 22 points in 29 games, as the club finished in 8th.

Off the ice, she held a job within the Modo organisation team office, including starting the MODO Women's Future programme, which organised practices for young girls in the region with Modo's professional women's players. For the 2017–18 SDHL season, she took a year of leave from her job with Modo to focus on playing full-time.

=== Brynäs IF ===
In June 2018, Grahm announced that she was leaving Modo to sign a two-year contract with Brynäs IF Dam which would include an off-ice position as a manager for the women's side and training towards becoming future Sports Manager for the whole organisation. The move came as Brynäs had begun a wide-ranging rebuild after suffering poor results and numerous player complaints in previous seasons. She would be named team captain ahead of the 2018–19 SDHL season.

In March 2020, after putting up 33 points in 33 games in the 2019–20 SDHL season and leading the club to the semi-finals for the first time in seven years, she announced that she had extended her contract with the team by another two years.

=== International ===
Grahm took part in the selection camp for the Swedish national team at the 2010 Winter Olympics, but failed to make the team, being the last player cut from the roster. She would make her Olympic debut in 2014, scoring 4 points in 6 games as Sweden finished in 4th, losing the bronze medal game to Switzerland. She would score 5 points in 6 games, including her first Olympic goal, at the 2018 Winter Olympics, as Sweden finished in 7th.

An assistant captain for the Swedish national team and having made over 200 international appearances, Grahm was one of the leaders of the 2019 players' strike over lack of compensation for international games and sub-standard conditions, including the decision by the Swedish Olympic Committee to cut all funding for the women's team and the team's first-ever relegation from the top IIHF division.

== Personal life ==
In 2011, Grahm faced a major health scare after becoming partially paralyzed as a result of Guillain-Barré syndrome. After going through months of treatment and rehabilitation, she was able to make a healthy return to professional hockey. In 2014, she published a book about her experience called From paralyzed to an Olympian.

== Career statistics ==
Note: Riksserien changed its name to the SDHL in 2016.

			Regular season					Playoffs
Season	Team	League	GP	G	A	Pts	PIM	GP	G	A	Pts	PIM
2007–08	Modo Hockey	Riksserien	13	3	3	6	8	4	1	0	1	2
2008–09	Modo Hockey	Riksserien	20	10	10	20	30	7	5	1	6	0
2009–10	Modo Hockey	Riksserien	25	8	15	23	20	5	1	2	3	2
2010–11	Modo Hockey	Riksserien	28	20	12	32	8	2	1	1	2	0
2011–12	Modo Hockey	Riksserien	22	10	9	19	8	3	4	2	6	0
2012–13	Modo Hockey	Riksserien	24	15	9	24	14	3	4	1	5	12
2013–14	Modo Hockey	Riksserien	27	18	21	39	46	3	3	2	5	0
2014–15	Modo Hockey	Riksserien	28	13	22	35	16	5	5	2	7	2
2015–16	Modo Hockey	Riksserien	29	11	11	22	18	-	-	-	-	-
2016–17	Modo Hockey	SDHL	36	19	21	40	8	2	0	0	0	0
2017–18	Modo Hockey	SDHL	36	23	19	42	14	5	0	0	0	0
2018–19	Brynäs IF	SDHL	34	11	19	30	20	3	0	1	1	2
2019–20	Brynäs IF	SDHL	34	12	21	33	4	5	4	5	9	4
SDHL totals			358	175	193	368	216	47	28	17	45	24
