= Natalie Snodgrass =

American ice hockey player (born 1998)

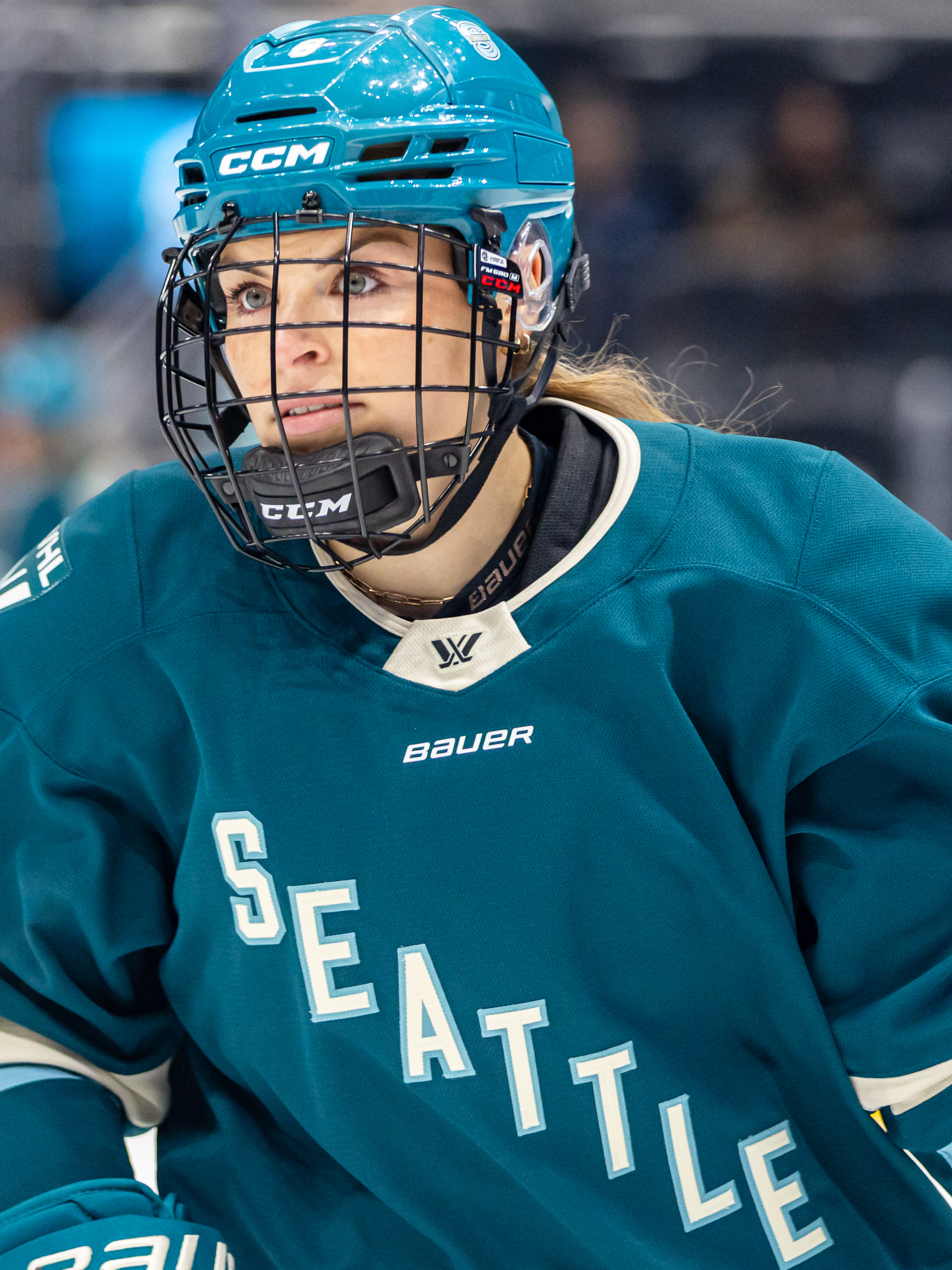
- Snodgrass with the Seattle Torrent in 2025
- Born: December 17, 1998 (age 27) Eagan, Minnesota, U.S.
- Height: 168 cm (5 ft 6 in)
- Position: Forward
- Shoots: Right
- PWHL team Former teams: Vegas Vanguards; Seattle Torrent; Ottawa Charge; Minnesota Whitecaps
- National team: United States
- Playing career: 2017–present

Natalie Claire Snodgrass (born December 17, 1998) is an American professional ice hockey forward for the Vegas Vanguards of the Professional Women's Hockey League (PWHL). She previously played for the Ottawa Charge and the Seattle Torrent of the PWHL and the Minnesota Whitecaps of the Premier Hockey Federation (PHF). She played college ice hockey at UConn where she was a two-year captain and finished as the program's all-time leading goal scorer with 70 goals.

Internationally, Snodgrass represented the United States at the 2015 and 2016 IIHF World Women's U18 Championship, winning gold medals both times. At the 2016 tournament in St. Catharines, she scored both the game-tying goal in the third period and the overtime game-winner as the United States came from behind to defeat Canada 3–2 in the gold medal game. She was named the U.S. Player of the Game and led Team USA in tournament scoring. Snodgrass made her senior national team debut in February 2023 during the Rivalry Series against Canada. She has been described as a power forward with deceptive speed.

== Early life ==
Born to Nancy and Joe Snodgrass in Eagan, Minnesota, Snodgrass is the youngest of three kids including sister Emily and brother John. Hockey runs in the Snodgrass family; her father Joe played college hockey, while both of her siblings also played at the collegiate level. Her sister also played professionally in the European Women's Hockey League with the EV Bozen Eagles

Snodgrass began skating on her family's backyard pond in Eagan, surrounded by her hockey-playing family members. Snodgrass attended Eastview High School in Apple Valley, where she played for the Eastview Lightning girls' hockey team. She was a four-time team MVP, two-time team captain, and four-time all-conference selection. Over six seasons at Eastview, she scored 141 goals, finishing as the school's all-time leading scorer. Her sister Emily had previously held Eastview's all-time scoring record with 97 goals and 91 assists.

External videos
- Natalie Snodgrass, FanDuel Sports Network North retrieved December 29, 2025

During her junior year in 2015–16, Snodgrass had what she described at the time as "the best year of my hockey career." She delivered dramatic late-game heroics in the Class 2A, Section 3 final against rival Eagan, scoring three goals including the game-tying goal with less than 10 seconds remaining in regulation and the overtime winner to send Eastview to the state tournament. For her performance during the season, she was named the 2016 Pioneer Press Metro Player of the Year and a 2016 USA Today First Team All-American. She also earned Minneapolis Star Tribune All-Metro First Team honors and was an All-State selection. Eastview reached the state tournament in her sophomore, junior, and senior years.

Snodgrass was a National Honor Society member and honor roll student-athlete throughout her high school career. She committed to the University of Connecticut to play college hockey, following in her sister Emily's footsteps. According to Darwitz, Snodgrass told her, "I'm going to go put women's hockey on the map at UConn," crediting her for taking an unconventional route and paving her own path.

== Playing career ==
=== College ===
In 2017, Snodgrass began attending the University of Connecticut and played college ice hockey for the Huskies. She chose UConn in part because she had visited her sister Emily, who played for the Huskies from 2011 to 2015 and scored 70 goals for the program, giving head coach Chris MacKenzie the opportunity to recruit her as his most highly touted recruit in six seasons. According to her mentor Natalie Darwitz, Snodgrass told her, "I'm going to go put women's hockey on the map at UConn," crediting her for taking an unconventional route and paving her own path.

Snodgrass made an immediate impact in her debut season, scoring the game-winning goal in overtime in the season opener at St. Cloud State on September 29, 2017. During the 2017–18 season, she scored 21 goals and 17 assists in 38 games in her rookie NCAA season, leading Connecticut in points and becoming the first freshman to do so since her sister Emily in the 2011–12 season. Her 38 points ranked eighth in Hockey East and were the second-most among all freshmen in the conference. She also led the team in shots on goal (170), plus-minus rating (+14), and power play goals (7), while recording 12 multi-point games and five multi-goal games. In the Hockey East playoffs, Snodgrass scored two goals in the last 10 minutes to lift UConn to a win over Providence in the quarterfinals on February 25, and two more in a 4–2 victory over No. 3 Boston College in the semifinals on March 3. The Huskies, who had been in last place in Hockey East on January 26, completed an improbable run to the Hockey East championship game before losing 2–1 to Northeastern. For her performance, Snodgrass was named to the Pro Ambitions All-Rookie Team and earned Hockey East All-Star Honorable Mention. She was also a four-time selection as the Pro Ambitions Rookie of the Week.

During the 2018–19 season, in her sophomore year, she scored 12 goals and 17 assists in 36 games, once again leading Connecticut in scoring for the second consecutive season. Between December 30 and January 12, she scored nine goals in five games, all UConn wins. In 34 regular season games, she took 169 shots, 64 more than anyone else on the team. Reflecting on her development, Snodgrass said, "Looking back, I see how mature I've grown as a hockey player. You look at the freshmen now, and you see that there's a learning curve. You don't really realize it... but I used be that player, that inexperienced hockey player, even though I thought I was as talented as the other girls."

Snodgrass was named an assistant captain for the team ahead of the 2019–20 season. She led Connecticut in scoring for the third consecutive season, finishing with 16 goals and 17 assists in 39 games, which ranked tied for seventh in goals and 10th in points in Hockey East. Her season included a career-high five points (two goals, three assists) in a 7–0 shutout of Brown on November 5, seven multi-point games, four multi-assist games, and two multi-goal games. She accumulated two separate five-game point streaks during the season. Snodgrass notched her 100th career collegiate point with a game-winning goal in Game 3 of the Hockey East Quarterfinals on March 1, 2020, becoming the fifth player in Connecticut history to reach the mark. She was named a Hockey East Second Team All-Star and Hockey East Player of the Week on November 18, 2019. The Huskies finished with 19 wins, tying for third-most in program history, and reached the Hockey East championship game.

Snodgrass was named team captain for the 2020–21 season. In October 2020, she was one of 53 players invited to the U.S. Women's National Team Evaluation Camp held at the National Sports Center in Blaine, Minnesota. The camp was part of the selection process for the 2021 IIHF Women's World Championship and preparation for the 2022 Olympics. Reflecting on the camp experience, Snodgrass said, "I think the feedback I received at the end of the camp was positive, and I know what to work towards for this season. At the end of the day, the World Championships are after the Hockey East playoffs, which is my first concern." During the COVID-19-shortened season, Snodgrass played in all 20 games, recording six goals and four assists. She led the team with 101 shots and totaled 11 games with five shots or more. She was named a Hockey East Third Team All-Star.

Snodgrass returned for a fifth season as a graduate student, utilizing the extra year of NCAA eligibility granted due to COVID-19 disruptions. She continued as team captain for her final season. During the 2021–22 season, she played in all 37 games, and scored 12 goals and 17 assists. With her 12 goals on the season, she officially became the program's all-time leading goal scorer with 70 career goals, surpassing her sister Emily's previous program record. The 2021–22 season was the most successful in program history, as the Huskies racked up 24 wins and advanced to the Hockey East Championship for the third time in five years. She was named Hockey East All-Star Honorable Mention for the 2021–22 season.

Snodgrass finished her collegiate career with 139 points (70 goals, 69 assists) in 170 games, tied for the most games played in program history. She left UConn as the program's all-time leading goal scorer, second in career points, and second in career assists.

=== Professional ===
==== Minnesota Whitecaps (2022–23) ====
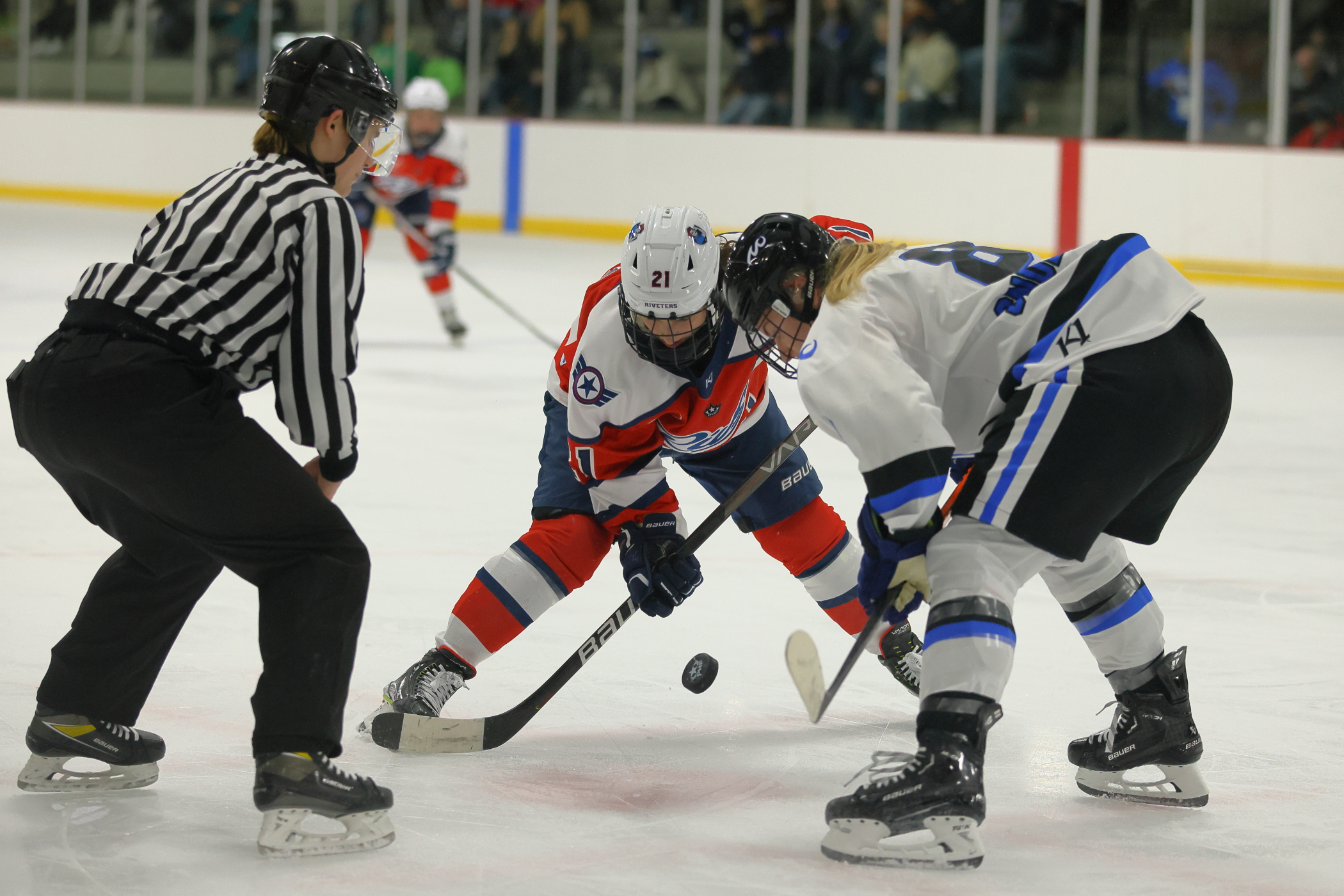
Snodgrass in a game against the NY Riveters on December 3, 2022

Following her collegiate career, Snodgrass signed a one-year contract with the Minnesota Whitecaps of the Premier Hockey Federation (PHF) on July 15, 2022. "The opportunity to come back to Minnesota after playing five years out east with the UConn Huskies is what ultimately attracted me to the Whitecaps," Snodgrass said. "Getting the chance to play for my home team in front of my friends and family is what's going to make this year a special one for me, and I can't wait to get started." Whitecaps head coach Ronda Engelhardt said, "We are very excited to have Natalie back playing in Minnesota. Natalie has a strong presence on the ice and will bring offensive power for us."

Snodgrass made an immediate impact in her professional debut, quickly becoming one of the Whitecaps' best players. Through 14 games by early February, Snodgrass led the team with 16 points (eight goals, eight assists). She finished the regular season with 20 points (10 goals, 10 assists) in 22 games, tying veteran Jonna Albers for the team lead in scoring. Her 10 goals tied her for third-most game-winning goals in the regular season. On her 24th birthday, December 17, she scored a hat trick, a moment she described as one of the best of her season, which coincidentally occurred the same day as the Minnesota Vikings' historic comeback victory. For the weekend of December 16–18, 2022, she was named PHF First Star of the Week. The Whitecaps started the season slowly, losing their first four games including two overtime defeats. They subsequently won eight of 10 games, rising to third in the league standings and taking a four-game winning streak into the all-star break. The team finished fourth in the standings with a 12–12 record, however they had lost eight consecutive games entering the playoffs.

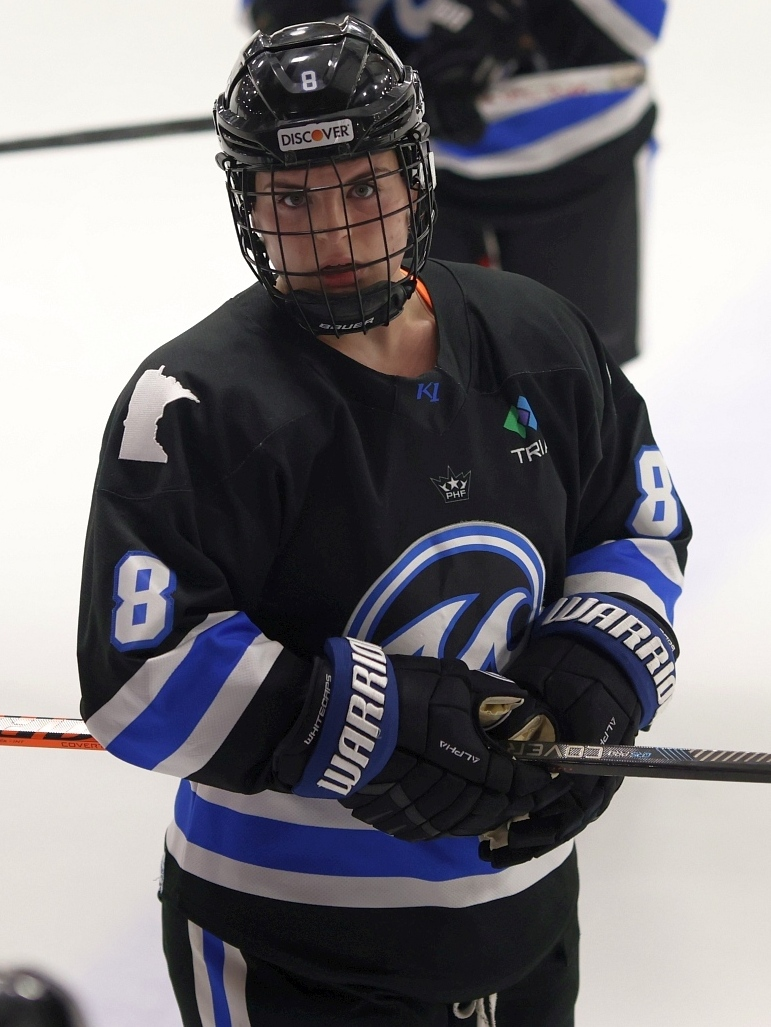
Snodgrass with the Minnesota Whitecaps in 2023

In February 2023, Snodgrass was selected as one of six Whitecaps players to participate in the PHF All-Star Tournament in Toronto, where she played for Team USA. She assisted on a goal by team captain Sydney Brodt during the tournament. Reflecting on the experience, Snodgrass said, "Honestly, I haven't really expected any of these honors. I just kind of go out and play my best, give it my best shot, have some fun with it. So to get these opportunities have been really fulfilling for me and it's just been a reminder that I made the right choice of coming here." Despite entering the playoffs on an eight-game losing streak and being the fourth seed, the Whitecaps shocked the hockey world by sweeping the two-time defending champion Boston Pride in the semifinals. Minnesota had been 0–4 in their previous meetings against the Pride during the regular season. "I think there's still a lot of people doubting us," Snodgrass said before the final. "I'm not sure anyone thought we were going to make it this far. Why not go win it all?" In Game 2 of the semifinals on March 18, Snodgrass scored her first professional playoff goal at 12:45 of the third period, assisted by Liz Schepers, to put Minnesota ahead 4–1 and effectively seal the victory. She led the Whitecaps with seven shots on goal in the game. ESPN noted that Snodgrass "tied for the third-most regular season game-winning goals and notched another marker in Game 2 against Boston." The Whitecaps advanced to the Isobel Cup Final against the Toronto Six on March 26, 2023, at Mullett Arena in Tempe, Arizona. In the championship game, Snodgrass assisted on goals by Brooke Madsen in the second period and Jonna Albers in the third period. In the second period, Snodgrass made a "sensational pass in front to Brooke Madsen, and Madsen had only to reach out and redirect the puck" to tie the game 2–2. Despite the Whitecaps' efforts, Toronto's Tereza Vanišová scored at 4:19 of overtime to give the Six a 4–3 victory. For her performance in her rookie season, Snodgrass was named a Rookie of the Year finalist and earned PHF All-Star honors. On June 27, 2023, Snodgrass signed a two-year contract extension with the Whitecaps. However, following the signing, the PHF ceased operations and was acquired to form the Professional Women's Hockey League (PWHL), nullifying the contract.

==== Ottawa Charge (2023–25) ====
After going undrafted in the inaugural 2023 PWHL Draft, Snodgrass signed as a free agent with PWHL Ottawa following a strong showing at the team's training camp. Snodgrass made her PWHL debut on January 13, 2024, in Toronto against the Toronto Sceptres, scoring her first career PWHL goal in her first game. The goal came on a 3-on-1 rush in the second period after a Toronto line change, assisted by goaltender Emerance Maschmeyer, who recorded the first goaltender assist in PWHL history with a stretch pass. Snodgrass's goal restored Ottawa's three-goal advantage at 5:40 of the second period in what became a 5–1 victory, marking Ottawa's first win in franchise history.

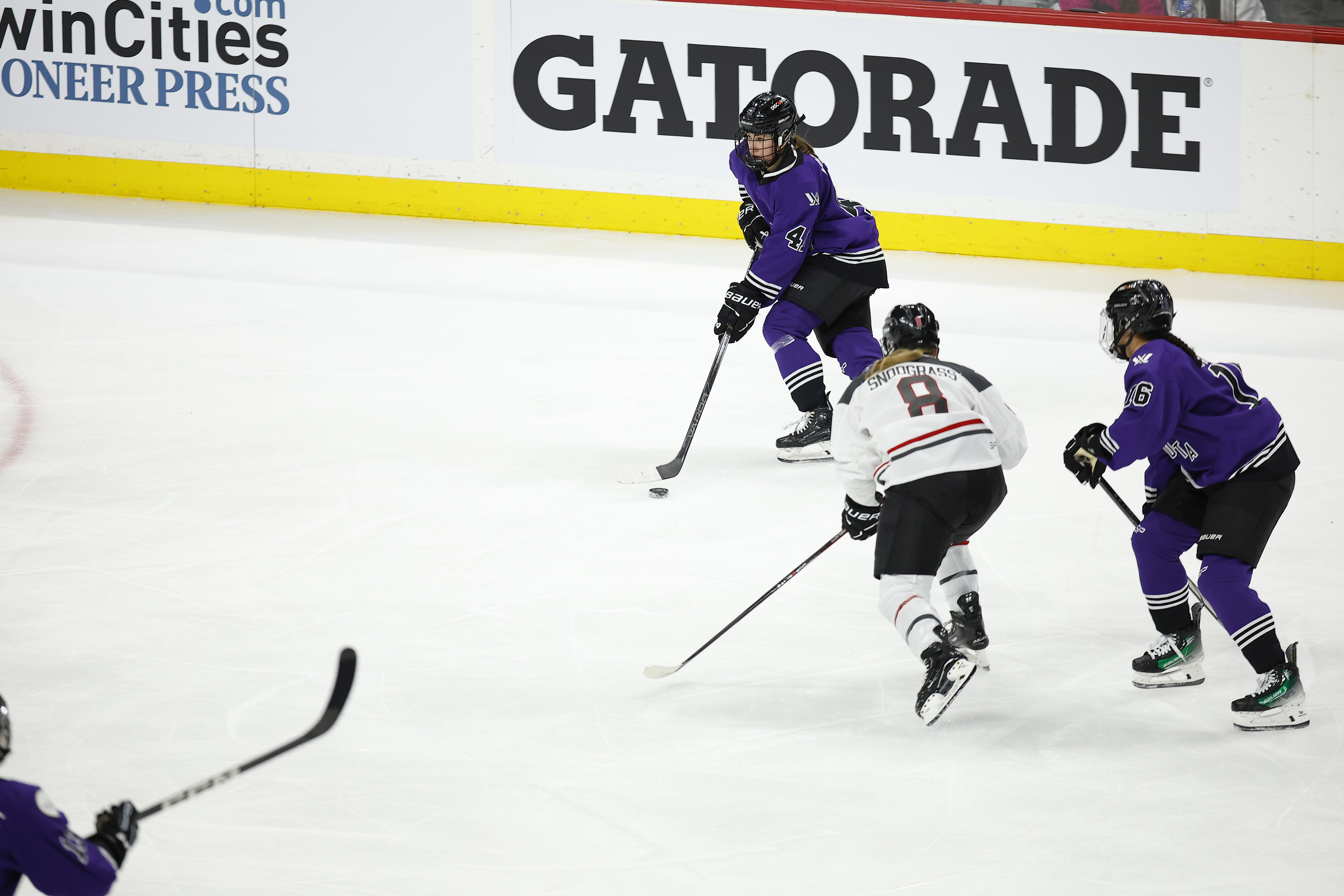
Snodgrass (#8) playing in an Ottawa Charge game against Minnesota on March 5, 2024

During the 2023–24 season, Snodgrass played in 23 games, recording one goal and five assists for six points. She played on both the powerplay and penalty killing units, demonstrating her versatility. Ottawa general manager Mike Hirshfeld said, "Natalie is a valuable member of our group. She played on the powerplay and on the penalty killing units last season. She's a great teammate and a real competitive player on the ice. She battles out there." Snodgrass only missed the team's home opener on January 2, playing in every other game during the inaugural season. On June 5, 2024, she signed a one-year contract extension with Ottawa, becoming the first player in the PWHL to sign a contract extension in the 2024 offseason.

During the 2024–25 season, Snodgrass competed in 21 games for the Charge, recording one goal and one assist for two points. She averaged approximately seven minutes of ice time per game and finished with a plus/minus of -2. However, Snodgrass did not appear in any of Ottawa's playoff games as the Charge advanced all the way to the PWHL Final, ultimately losing to the Minnesota Frost in four games. Over her two seasons with Ottawa, Snodgrass appeared in 44 regular-season games, recording eight points (two goals, six assists).

==== Seattle Torrent (2025–26) ====
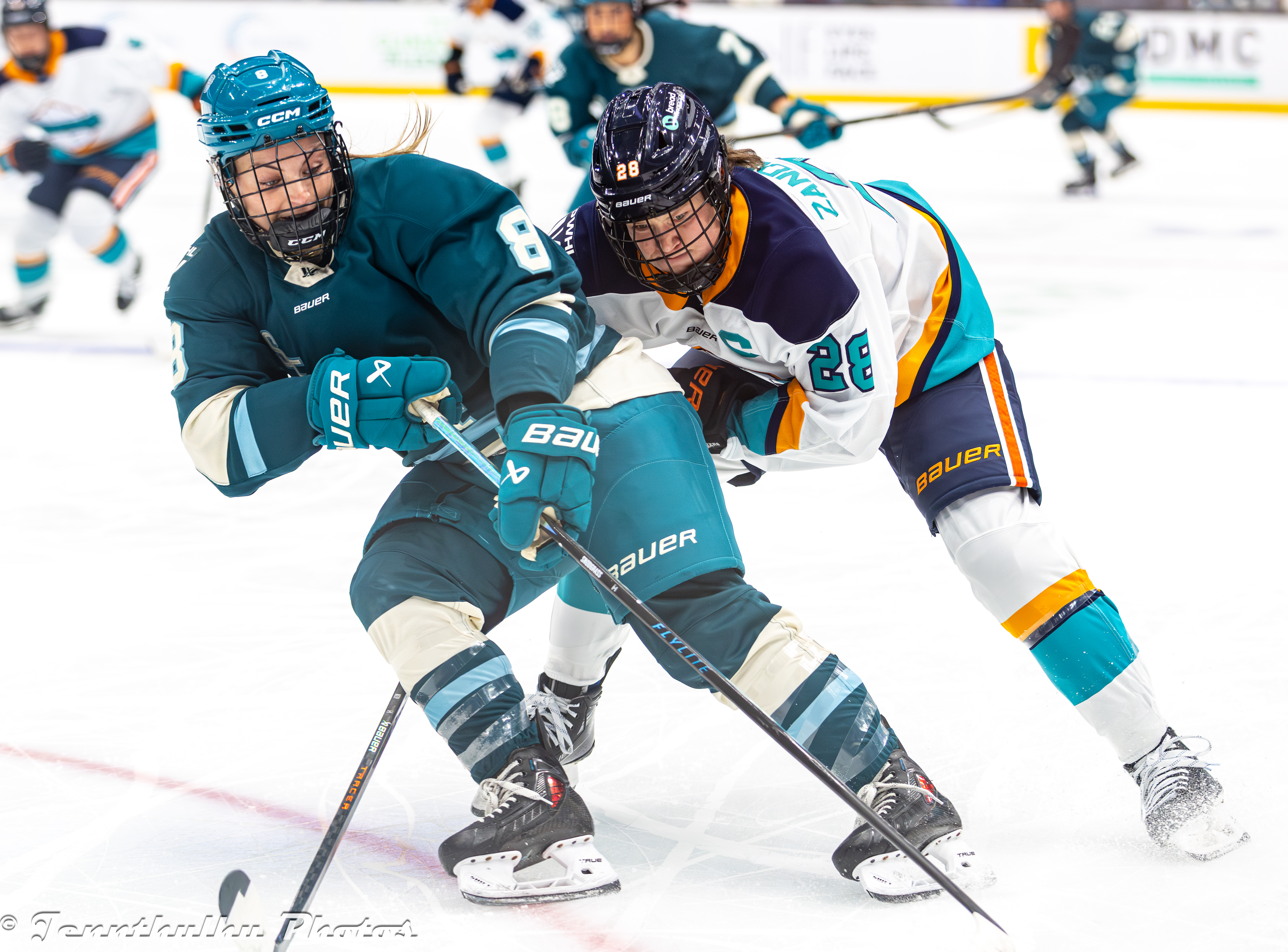
Snodgrass (left) playing for the Seattle Torrent on December 3, 2025

On June 18, 2025, Snodgrass signed a one-year contract with the Seattle Torrent, one of two PWHL expansion teams added for the 2025–26 season. Seattle general manager Meghan Turner said, "Natalie is a strong skater with the versatility to play in a number of different roles. She competes hard every shift and brings a consistent work ethic that makes her a valuable addition to our group. Her ability to adapt in all situations will make her an important piece of our lineup." Snodgrass reunited with former Ottawa teammates Danielle Serdachny and Aneta Tejralová in Seattle. Snodgrass made her debut for the Torrent during their first game of the season against fellow expansion team Vancouver Goldeneyes at Pacific Coliseum, losing 4–3 in overtime.

Through the first month of the season, Snodgrass was a regular in the Torrent lineup, playing on a line with Lexie Adzija and Mikyla Grant-Mentis. Snodgrass made her Torrent debut during the team's inaugural home game on November 28, 2025, against the two-time defending Walter Cup champion Minnesota Frost at Climate Pledge Arena drew 16,014 fans, setting multiple attendance records. The attendance broke the record for the largest crowd for a women's hockey game in a U.S. arena, surpassing the previous U.S. arena record of 15,359 set during an NCAA game between the University of Wisconsin and St. Cloud State on January 14, 2017. It also surpassed the U.S. record for a professional women's hockey game of 14,288, set at the PWHL Takeover Tour in Detroit on March 16, 2025, and became the highest-attended primary home venue game in PWHL history. The crowd topped the previous Climate Pledge Arena record for a women's hockey game of 14,551 fans for the 2022 Rivalry Series. Despite the historic turnout, the Torrent lost 3–0 to Minnesota. On December 28, 2025, Snodgrass recorded an assist on Mikyla Grant-Mentis's goal in a 4–3 loss to the New York Sirens in Dallas as part of the PWHL Takeover Tour.

==== Vegas Vanguards (2026–present) ====
On June 21, 2026, she signed a one-year contract with the Vegas Vanguards.

== International play ==
=== Junior ===
Snodgrass represented the United States at the 2015 IIHF World Women's U18 Championship in Buffalo, New York, winning gold on home soil. The United States defeated Canada 3–2 in overtime in the gold medal game, with Jincy Dunne scoring the game-winner on the power play 51 seconds into the extra period. The following year, Snodgrass returned to the U.S. Under-18 Team for the 2016 IIHF World Women's U18 Championship in St. Catharines, Ontario. She was named Team USA's leading scorer for the tournament. In the gold medal game against Canada on January 15, 2016, Snodgrass scored both the game-tying goal in the third period and the overtime game-winner as the United States came from behind to defeat Canada 3–2. With Canada leading 2–0 deep into the game, Snodgrass sparked the comeback by scoring a wraparound goal to tie the game in the third period. At 1:47 of overtime, she backhanded a rebound into the net from the top of the crease to secure the gold medal for the United States. She was named the U.S. Player of the Game. Throughout the 2016 tournament, Snodgrass honored Patrick Schoonover, a 14-year-old hockey player from her hometown who had died in 2014 from previously-undiagnosed heart defects, by displaying the number 96 on her stick. She dedicated the victory to Patrick and his family, saying, "It definitely felt like Patrick was there during the game with us, pushing us. It was an awesome feeling to be able to honor him." Snodgrass donated her stick to the Hockey Hall of Fame, where it went on display celebrating both her performance and her tribute to Schoonover.

=== Support for 2017 national team strike ===
In March 2017, when the players of the senior American national team went on strike over pay and working conditions ahead of the 2017 IIHF Women's World Championship, Snodgrass—then a high school senior at Eastview High School—was invited by USA Hockey to join the roster as a replacement player. She publicly declined the invitation on March 24, 2017, standing in solidarity with the striking players. On Twitter, she wrote, "Today I will do what others won't so tomorrow I can do what others can't. I said no to USAH & will not play in the 2017WC #BeBoldForChange". Snodgrass was one of dozens of players who rejected USA Hockey's replacement offers, with many sharing their decisions on social media.

=== Senior ===
Snodgrass made her senior national team debut in February 2023 during the Rivalry Series against Canada. She was one of five players making their national team debut for the U.S. during the series.

== Style of play ==
Snodgrass has been described as a power forward with deceptive speed, but has an occasional tendency to be undisciplined on the ice.

== Personal life ==
Snodgrass studied health sciences at the University of Connecticut. Growing up in Minnesota, where more than 13,500 young women play hockey, she was inspired by hometown hero Natalie Darwitz, a three-time Olympian and one of the greatest players to come from the state. Darwitz, who later became a family friend and now coaches at Hamline University in St. Paul, watched Snodgrass develop from a five-year-old skating in her backyard to a high school standout. Snodgrass once dressed as Darwitz for Halloween, citing her as a role model both because they shared the same first name and because of Darwitz's accomplishments. According to her USA Hockey profile, Snodgrass's favorite postgame meal is spaghetti and meatballs.

== Career statistics ==
			Regular Season					Playoffs
Season	Team	League	GP	G	A	Pts	PIM	GP	G	A	Pts	PIM
2017–18	University of Connecticut	Hockey East	38	21	17	38	22	—	—	—	—	—
2018–19	University of Connecticut	Hockey East	36	15	14	29	26	—	—	—	—	—
2019–20	University of Connecticut	Hockey East	39	16	17	33	34	—	—	—	—	—
2020–21	University of Connecticut	Hockey East	20	6	4	10	6	—	—	—	—	—
2021–22	University of Connecticut	Hockey East	37	12	17	29	22	—	—	—	—	—
2022–23	Minnesota Whitecaps	PHF	22	10	10	20	4	3	1	2	3	0
2023–24	PWHL Ottawa	PWHL	23	1	5	6	10	—	—	—	—	—
2024–25	Ottawa Charge	PWHL	21	1	1	2	2	—	—	—	—	—
2025–26	Seattle Torrent	PWHL	29	2	3	5	4	—	—	—	—	—
PHF totals			22	10	10	20	4	3	1	2	3	0
PWHL totals			73	4	9	13	16	—	—	—	—	—
