= 2018 4 Nations Cup =

Tournament details
- Host country: Canada
- Venue: 1 (in 1 host city)
- Dates: November 6–10
- Teams: 4

Final positions
- Champions: United States (9th title)
- Runners-up: Canada
- Third place: Finland
- Fourth place: Sweden

Tournament statistics
- Games played: 8
- Goals scored: 43 (5.38 per game)
- Scoring leader: (United States) Hilary Knight (7 points)

The 2018 4 Nations Cup was a women's ice hockey tournament held in Saskatoon, Saskatchewan, Canada. It was the 23rd edition of the 4 Nations Cup.

== Results ==
=== Preliminary round ===
Pos	Team	Pld	W	OTW	OTL	L	GF	GA	GD	Pts	Qualification
1	United States	3	3	0	0	0	12	3	+9	9	Advance to Gold medal game
2	Canada (H)	3	2	0	0	1	10	2	+8	6	Advance to Gold medal game
3	Finland	3	1	0	0	2	4	10	−6	3	Advance to Bronze medal game
4	Sweden	3	0	0	0	3	4	14	−10	0	Advance to Bronze medal game

Source: Hockey Canada
Rules for classification: 1) points; 2) head-to-head points; 3) head-to-head goal difference; 4) head-to-head number of goals scored; 5) result against closest best-ranked team outside tied teams; 6) result against second-best ranked team outside tied teams; 7) seeding before tournament.
(H) Host

All times are local (UTC−6).

November 6, 2018; 12:00	Finland	1–5 (1–0, 0–5, 0–0)	United States	SaskTel Centre, Saskatoon

Game reference
Noora Räty	Goalies	Maddie Rooney
12 min	Penalties	6 min
10	Shots	49

November 6, 2018; 19:00	Canada	6–1 (3–0, 1–0, 2–1)	Sweden	SaskTel Centre, Saskatoon

Game reference
Shannon Szabados	Goalies	Lovisa Selander
8 min	Penalties	8 min
52	Shots	18

November 7, 2018; 15:00	Sweden	2–3 (0–3, 0–0, 2–0)	Finland	SaskTel Centre, Saskatoon

Game reference
Maria Omberg	Goalies	Jenna Silvonen
8 min	Penalties	6 min
30	Shots	31

November 7, 2018; 19:00	United States	2–1 (1–0, 0–0, 1–1)	Canada	SaskTel Centre, Saskatoon

Game reference
Alex Rigsby	Goalies	Shannon Szabados
14 min	Penalties	6 min
33	Shots	24

November 8, 2018; 15:00	Sweden	1–5 (0–3, 1–1, 0–1)	United States	SaskTel Centre, Saskatoon

Game reference
Emma Söderberg	Goalies	Emma Polusny
4 min	Penalties	6 min
20	Shots	40

November 8, 2018; 19:30	Finland	0–3 (0–2, 0–0, 0–1)	Canada	SaskTel Centre, Saskatoon

Game reference
Noora Räty	Goalies	Emerance Maschmeyer
10 min	Penalties	8 min
14	Shots	48

=== Bronze medal game ===
November 10, 2018; 15:00	Sweden	2–4 (1–0, 1–1, 0–3)	Finland	SaskTel Centre, Saskatoon

Game reference

Maria Omberg
Goalies
Noora Räty

Winberg (Nylén Persson, Ljungblom) – 10:31	1–0
	1–1	30:08 – Hiirikoski
Winberg (Ljungblom, Grahm) – 31:07	2–1
	2–2	45:01 – Hakala (Tulus, Hiirikoski) (PP)
	2–3	48:36 – Rajahuhta (Niskanen, Tuominen)
	2–4	49:05 – Nieminen (Rahunen, Tulus)

6 min
Penalties
2 min
33
Shots
34

=== Gold medal game ===
November 10, 2018; 20:00	Canada	2–5 (1–2, 0–2, 1–1)	United States	SaskTel Centre, Saskatoon

Game reference

Shannon Szabados
Emerance Maschmeyer
Goalies
Alex Rigsby

	0–1	01:28 – Knight (Cameranesi)
Fortino – 03:49	1–1
	1–2	16:31 – Samoskevich (Pannek, Flanagan)
	1–3	31:37 – Decker (Brodt, Coyne Schofield)
	1–4	32:01 – Knight (Morin, Cameranesi)
	1–5	40:41 – Coyne Schofield (Decker, Bellamy)
Bourbonnais (Gabel) (PP) – 49:57	2–5

10 min
Penalties
8 min
25
Shots
25

== Statistics ==
=== Final standings ===
Gold medal	United States
Silver medal	Canada
Bronze medal	Finland
4	Sweden

=== Scoring leaders ===
Only the top ten skaters, sorted by points, then goals, are included in this list.

Player	GP	G	A	Pts	PIM	POS
(United States) Hilary Knight	4	3	4	7	0	F
(United States) Brianna Decker	4	3	3	6	2	F
(United States) Dani Cameranesi	4	2	4	6	6	F
(United States) Sydney Brodt	4	3	2	5	0	F
(Canada) Rebecca Johnston	4	1	4	5	0	F
(United States) Kendall Coyne Schofield	4	1	4	5	2	F
(Canada) Mélodie Daoust	4	3	1	4	0	F
(Canada) Marie-Philip Poulin	4	1	3	4	6	F
(United States) Hannah Brandt	4	2	1	3	2	F
(Sweden) Lina Ljungblom	4	0	3	3	2	F

GP = Games played; G = Goals; A = Assists; Pts = Points; PIM = Penalties in minutes; POS = Position
Source: Hockey Canada

=== Goaltending leaders ===
Only the top four goaltenders, based on save percentage, who played at least 40% of their team's minutes, are included in this list.

Player	TOI	GA	GAA	SA	Sv%	SO
(United States) Alex Rigsby	120:00	3	1.50	49	.939	0
(Finland) Noora Räty	180:00	9	3.00	129	.930	0
(Canada) Shannon Szabados	160:00	8	3.00	74	.892	0
(Sweden) Maria Omberg	116:00	7	3.62	65	.892	0

TOI = Time on ice (minutes:seconds); SA = Shots against; GA = Goals against; GAA = Goals against average; Sv% = Save percentage; SO = Shutouts
Source: Hockey Canada
