= Kaleigh Quennec =

Swiss ice hockey player (born 1998)

- Born: 15 February 1998 (age 28) Vuisternens-devant-Romont, Fribourg, Switzerland
- Height: 1.72 m (5 ft 8 in)
- Weight: 79 kg (174 lb; 12 st 6 lb)
- Position: Forward
- Shoots: Right
- SWHL A team Former teams: SC Bern; Montreal Carabins; HC Université Neuchâtel
- National team: Switzerland
- Playing career: 2014–present
- Website: kaleighquennec.com
Medal record
Olympic Games
Bronze medal – third place	2026 Milano Cortina	Team

Kaleigh Quennec (born 15 February 1998) is a Swiss ice hockey player and member of the Swiss national team. She is signed in the Swiss Women's League (SWHL A) with SC Bern Frauen for the 2024–25 season.

== Playing career ==
Quennec played in the Swiss Mini A and Top Novizen leagues with the youth teams of Genève-Servette HC. During the 2016–17 season, she attended the Loomis Chaffee School in Windsor, Connecticut and played with the LC girls' varsity team in the New England Prep Division I league.

Her college ice hockey career was played with the Montreal Carabins women's ice hockey program in the Réseau du sport étudiant du Québec (RSEQ) conference of U Sports during 2017 to 2024.

== International play ==
As a junior player with the Swiss national under-18 team, she participated in the IIHF U18 Women's World Championships at the Division I Group A tournament in 2014 and at the Top Division tournaments in 2015 and 2016.

Quennec represented Switzerland in the women'ice hockey tournament at the 2022 Winter Olympics in Beijing and at the IIHF Women's World Championships in 2019, 2021, 2022, 2023, and 2024.

== Personal life ==
Her father, Hugh Quennec, was the franchise owner and president of Genève-Servette HC during 2005 to 2017, and of Servette FC during 2012 to 2015.
