= Jaime Bourbonnais =

Canadian ice hockey player (born 1998)

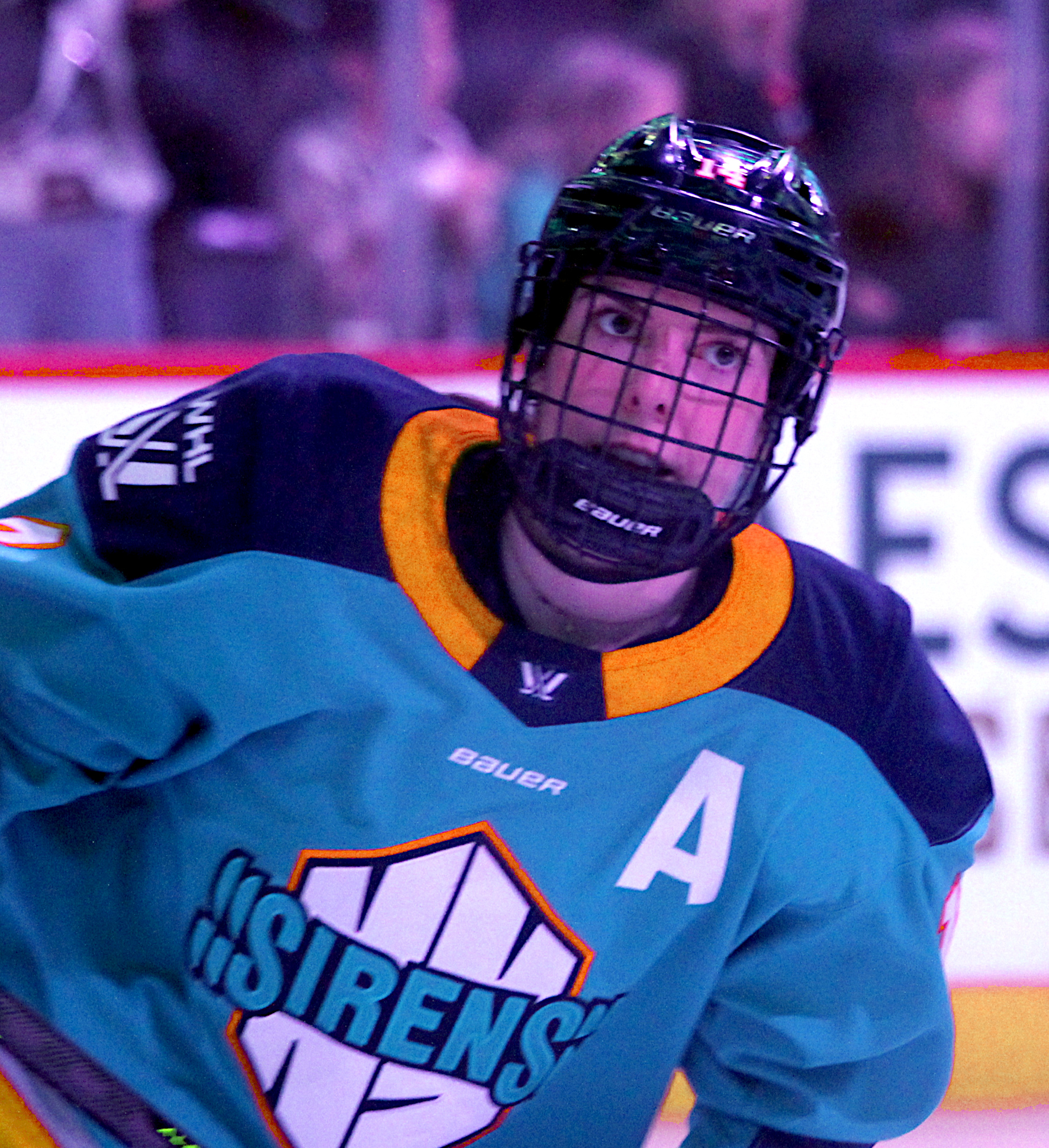
- Bourbonnais with the New York Sirens in 2026
- Born: September 9, 1998 (age 27) Mississauga, Ontario, Canada
- Height: 5 ft 7 in (170 cm)
- Weight: 144 lb (65 kg; 10 st 4 lb)
- Position: Defence
- Shoots: Right
- PWHL team Former teams: New York Sirens; PWHPA
- National team: Canada
- Playing career: 2016–present

Jaime Claire Bourbonnais (born September 9, 1998) is a Canadian professional ice hockey defenceman for the New York Sirens of the Professional Women's Hockey League (PWHL) and member of the Canadian national team.

== Playing career ==
During her freshman season with the Cornell Big Red, Bourbonnais finishing tied for third on the team in points with 16. She finished the season selected for ECAC Hockey All-Rookie Team as well as an Honorable Mention All-Ivy.

After her second year, Bourbonnais was selected for the Second Team All-ECAC and First Team All-Ivy. She was also awarded Cornell's Tompkins Girls Hockey Association Cub Club Mentor honor.

Bourbonnais finished her junior season second in the nation for points amongst defensemen and fourth in the nation for assists and goals per game. After the 2018–19 season, Bourbonnais was awarded ECAC Best Defenseman after she recorded 29 points and led the team in Plus/Minus. She was also named to the First Team All-ECAC.

On September 18, 2023, Bourbonnais was drafted in the second round, 9th overall, by PWHL New York in the 2023 PWHL Draft. She signed a three-year deal with the club in November 2023. During her first two seasons in the PWHL she appeared in all 54 games for the Sirens and recorded seven goals and 13 assists. On November 18, 2025, she signed a one-year contract extension with the Sirens.

== International play ==
Medal record

Women's ice hockey

Representing Canada

World Championships
Gold medal – first place	2021 Canada	
Gold medal – first place	2024 United States	
Silver medal – second place	2023 Canada	
Bronze medal – third place	2019 Finland	

World U18 Championships
Silver medal – second place	2016 Canada	

Bourbonnais has represented Canada at the under-18 and senior levels. In her lone junior-level appearance at the 2016 IIHF World Women's U18 Championship, she won a silver medal.

== Career statistics ==
=== Regular season and playoffs ===
			Regular season					Playoffs
Season	Team	League	GP	G	A	Pts	PIM	GP	G	A	Pts	PIM
2013–14	Oakville Jr. Hornets	Prov. WHL	7	0	3	3	0	2	0	0	0	0
2014–15	Oakville Jr. Hornets	Prov. WHL	33	8	22	30	26	12	0	5	5	8
2015–16	Oakville Jr. Hornets	Prov. WHL	32	6	13	19	18	7	1	4	5	6
2016–17	Cornell University	ECAC	31	5	11	16	18	—	—	—	—	—
2017–18	Cornell University	ECAC	31	3	21	24	30	—	—	—	—	—
2018–19	Cornell University	ECAC	32	9	20	29	20	—	—	—	—	—
2019–20	Cornell University	ECAC	33	7	34	41	35	—	—	—	—	—
2020–21	Team Bauer	PWHPA	4	0	2	2	0	—	—	—	—	—
2021–22	Team Harvey's	PWHPA	4	0	3	3	0	—	—	—	—	—
2022–23	Team Scotiabank	PWHPA	19	1	11	12	8	—	—	—	—	—
2023–24	PWHL New York	PWHL	24	5	8	13	12	—	—	—	—	—
2024–25	New York Sirens	PWHL	30	2	5	7	16	—	—	—	—	—
2025–26	New York Sirens	PWHL	28	1	9	10	12	—	—	—	—	—
PWHL totals			82	8	22	30	40	—	—	—	—	—

=== International ===
Year	Team	Event	Result	GP	G	A	Pts	PIM
2016	Canada	U18	2nd place, silver medalist(s)	5	2	0	2	4
2019	Canada	WC	3rd place, bronze medalist(s)	7	1	2	3	0
2021	Canada	WC	1st place, gold medalist(s)	7	1	0	1	2
2023	Canada	WC	2nd place, silver medalist(s)	7	0	1	1	2
2024	Canada	WC	1st place, gold medalist(s)	7	1	1	2	4
Junior totals				5	2	0	2	4
Senior totals				28	3	4	7	8

== Awards and honours ==
- 2017 All-Ivy Honorable Mention
- 2017 ECAC All-Rookie Team
- 2018 First Team All-Ivy
- 2018 ECAC Second Team All-Star
- 2019 First Team All-Ivy
- 2019 ECAC First Team All-Star
- 2019 ECAC Top Defenceman
- 2019 All-American Second Team
- 2019 All-USCHO First Team
- 2020 CCM/AHCA First-Team All-America
- 2020 First-Team All-USCHO
- 2020 Patty Kazmaier Award Top-10 Finalist
- 2020 ECAC Hockey Best Defenseman
- 2020 First-Team All-ECAC Hockey
- 2020 First-Team All-Ivy League
- 2020 Charles H. Moore Outstanding Senior Varsity Athlete

== Personal life ==
She is engaged to Emily Clark, her teammate on the Canadian national team and a player for PWHL Hamilton. Her grandfather, Roger Bourbonnais, also competed for Team Canada and was inducted into the IIHF Hall of Fame.
