= Hugh Quennec =

Canadian-Swiss sports executive

- Born: 28 June 1965 (age 60); Montreal, Quebec, Canada
- Occupations: Former franchise owner and president of Genève-Servette HC and Servette FC

Hugues "Hugh" Quennec (born 28 June 1965) was the principal owner and president of the two primary sports teams of Geneva, Switzerland: Genève-Servette HC (GSHC) and Servette FC. He held Genève-Servette HC from 2005 until being bought out for a symbolic fee of 1 Swiss franc (CHF) in 2017 and helmed Servette FC from March 2012 until 2015.

He had been the president of GSHC for seven years when Servette FC began experiencing significant financial difficulties in early 2012. He agreed to purchase Servette FC for a symbolic fee of 1.00 CHF in March 2012. Quennec was able to successfully turn around the club's financial difficulties, avoiding bankruptcy and ensuring the club would continue to participate in the Swiss Super League for the 2012–13 season.

== Personal life ==
Quennec was born in Montreal, Quebec, Canada to a Swiss mother from Fribourg and a French father from Brittany. He holds both Canadian and Swiss citizenship.

His daughter, Kaleigh Quennec, is a member of the Swiss women's national ice hockey team.
