= Brynäs IF (women) =

SDHL ice hockey team in Gävle, Sweden

- City: Gävle, Sweden
- League: SDHL
- Founded: 1998
- Home arena: Monitor ERP Arena
- Colors
- General manager: Erika Grahm
- Head coach: Filip Eriksson
- Captain: Julia Östlund

Championships
- Regular season titles: 1 (2012)

Brynäs IF are an ice hockey team in the Swedish Women's Hockey League (SDHL). They play in Gävle, on the eastern-central coast of Sweden, at the Monitor ERP Arena. A constituent part of the Swedish sports club Brynäs IF, they are the sister team of Brynäs IF of the Swedish Hockey League (SHL).

== History ==
Between 2010 and 2013, the club advanced to the Riksserien playoff finals four seasons in a row, finishing in second place each time. In 2014, the club unveiled new jerseys, the only ones in Europe to be completely ad-free.

Between 2013 and 2019, the club saw its fortunes decline dramatically, and in 2017, head coach Madeleine Östling left the club to coach Linköping instead.

After the 2017–18 season saw Brynäs finish in 8th place amid numerous complaints surrounding the treatment of players, the club launched a significant rebuild, firing head coach Åke Lilljebjörn, increasing investment into development programmes, and signing star forward Erika Grahm on a player-coach contract with the intention of training her to be the organisation's future Sports Manager.

After making a number of major signings, including Lara Stalder, Michela Cava, and Kateřina Mrázová, improved to 3rd in the league during the 2019–20 SDHL season, and advanced to the semi-finals for the first time in seven years. In January 2020, the club announced a cooperation with the municipality to create a local sports education centre, allowing young girls to specialise in hockey education during high school. After the end of the season, Stalder would be the first women to be awarded the Guldhjälmen as the SDHL's most valuable player.

The team began the 2020–21 SDHL season with a seven-game winning streak, the last team in the league to remain undefeated until a 5–3 loss to Linköping HC.

== Season-by-season results ==
This is a partial list of the most recent seasons completed by Brynäs IF. Note that the SDHL was known as Riksserien until 2016.

Code explanation: Finish = Rank at end of regular season; GP = Games played, W = Wins (3 points), OTW = Overtime wins (2 points), OTL = Overtime losses (1 point), L = Losses, GF = Goals for, GA = Goals against, Pts = Points, Top scorer: Points (Goals+Assists)

Season	League	Regular season										Postseason results
Season	League	Finish	GP	W	OTW	OTL	L	GF	GA	Pts	Top scorer	Postseason results
2015-16	Riksserien	7th	36	13	3	3	17	69	107	48	(Sweden) A. Östlund 27 (11+16)	Lost quarterfinal against Luleå HF/MSSK
2016-17	SDHL	6th	36	14	4	3	15	78	97	53	(Sweden) A. Borgqvist 36 (14+22)	Lost quarterfinal against Luleå HF/MSSK
2017-18	SDHL	8th	36	9	3	1	23	58	121	34	(Sweden) A. Borgqvist 23 (8+15)	Lost quarterfinal against Luleå HF/MSSK
2018-19	SDHL	7th	36	12	1	2	21	71	107	40	(Sweden) E. Grahm 30 (11+19)	Lost quarterfinal against Modo Hockey
2019-20	SDHL	3rd	36	21	4	3	8	140	99	74	(Switzerland) L. Stalder 71 (42+29)	Lost semifinal against Luleå HF/MSSK
2020-21	SDHL	2nd	36	28	1	2	5	168	76	88	(Switzerland) L. Stalder 82 (31+51)	Lost final against Luleå HF/MSSK
2021-22	SDHL	1st	36	30	0	3	3	179	69	93	(Switzerland) L. Stalder 89 (34+51)	Lost final against Luleå HF/MSSK
2022-23	SDHL	2nd	32	24	3	1	4	136	66	79	(Switzerland) L. Stalder 61 (18+43)	Lost final against Luleå HF/MSSK
2023-24	SDHL	3rd	36	16	9	3	8	126	73	69	(Sweden) H. Thuvik 38 (21+17)	Lost semifinal against MoDo Hockey

== Players and personnel ==
=== 2024–25 roster ===
As of 17 January 2025

No.	Nat	Player	Pos	S/G	Age	Acquired	Birthplace
28	(Sweden)	Jenny Antonsson (A)	F	L	24	2021	Asarum, Blekinge, Sweden
7	(Hungary)	Taylor Baker	D	R	28	2024	Toronto, Ontario, Canada
87	(Sweden)	Anna Brenkle	RW	L	19	2022	Örebro, Närke, Sweden
24	(Czech Republic)	Sára Čajanová	D	L	23	2022	Zlín, Zlínský kraj, Czechia
94	(Hungary)	Fanni Garát-Gasparics	F			2024	
98	(Sweden)	Tilde Sundnäs Grillfors	F	L	17	2024	Jönköping, Småland, Sweden
63	(Denmark)	Josefine Jakobsen	D	L	34	2023	Aalborg, Nordjylland, Denmark
16	(Sweden)	Selma Kalsson	D	L	17	2024	Karlskoga, Värmland, Sweden
8	(Finland)	Oona Koukkula	D	L	22	2024	Riihimäki, Kanta-Häme, Finland
89	(Sweden)	Stella Lindell	F	L	20	2021	Grästorp, Västergötland, Sweden
44	(Sweden)	Emmy Nordström Åmark	G	L	22	2024	Avesta, Dalarna, Sweden
18	(Finland)	Jenniina Nylund	F	L	26	2023	Pietarsaari, Ostrobothnia, Finland
31	(Norway)	Ena Nystrøm	G	L	25	2024	Stavanger, Vestlandet, Norway
76	(Canada)	Maude Poulin-Labelle	D	L	26	2024	Sherbrooke, Québec, Canada
88	(Sweden)	Stina Sandberg	F	L	21	2022	
82	(Sweden)	Annie Silén	D	L	23	2023	Huddinge, Södermanland, Sweden
20	(Sweden)	Celine Tedenby	F	L	26	2024	Örnsköldsvik, Ångermanland, Sweden
22	(Sweden)	Hanna Thuvik	F	L	23	2020	Skärhamn, Bohuslän, Sweden
86	(Finland)	Sanni Vanhanen	F	L	20	2024	Nokia, Pirkanmaa, Finland
12	(Sweden)	Mina Waxin	D	L	24	2021	Stockholm, Sweden
73	(Sweden)	Tillie Ytfeldt	F/D	L	17	2024	Släp, Halland, Sweden
57	(Sweden)	Maja Ålenius	D	R	20	2021	Gävle, Gästrikland, Sweden
11	(Sweden)	Matilda Österman	F	R	17	2024	Nyköping, Södermanland, Sweden
19	(Sweden)	Julia Östlund (C)	F	L	31	2023	Alunda, Uppland, Sweden

Coaching staff and team personnel

- Head coach: Filip Eriksson
- Assistant coach: Jakob Löf
- Goaltending coach: Johan Ryman
- Conditioning coach: Johan Holmström
- Equipment managers: Per Lindholm
- Physical therapists: Kent Larsson & Pär Thures

=== Team captaincy history ===
- Karin Johansson, 2009–10
- Joa Elfsberg, 2010–11
- Karin Johansson, 2012–13
- Angelica Östlund, 2013–2018
- Erika Grahm, 2018–2021
- Rosa Lindstedt, 2021–2023
- Maja Nylén Persson, 2023–24
- Julia Östlund, 2024–

=== Head coaches ===
- Johnny Pedersen, 2002–03
- Lars Landström, 2007–2009
- Magnus Grönlund, 2009–2012
- Henrik Orevik, 2012–2015
- Madeleine Östling, 2015–2017
- Åke Lilljebjörn, 2017–18
- Magnus Carlsson, 2018–19
- Henrik Glaas, 2019–2022
- Filip Eriksson, 2022–

== Franchise records and leaders ==
=== All-time scoring leaders ===
The top-ten point-scorers (goals + assists) of Brynäs IF.

Note: Nat = Nationality; Pos = Position; GP = Games played; G = Goals; A = Assists; Pts = Points; P/G = Points per game; = 2024–25 Brynäs IF player

Points
Nat	Player	Pos	GP	G	A	Pts	P/G
(Switzerland)	Lara Stalder	C	137	125	178	303	2.21
(Sweden)	Angelica Östlund	C	310	116	132	248	0.80
(Sweden)	Anna Borgqvist	C/LW	188	85	103	183	1.00
(Sweden)	Maja Nylén Persson	D	175	60	127	187	1.07
(Czech Republic)	Kateřina Mrázová	C	86	55	113	168	1.95
(Sweden)	Karin Johansson	RW	150	69	79	148	0.99
(Austria)	Anna Meixner	F	111	70	61	131	1.18
(Czech Republic)	Denisa Křížová	F	106	56	72	128	1.21
(Norway)	Henriette Sletbak	RW	133	55	59	114	0.86
(Sweden)	Angelica Lorsell	C	138	47	65	112	0.81

Source: Elite Prospects
