= 2012–13 Riksserien season =

- League: (Sweden) Riksserien
- Sport: Women's ice hockey
- Duration: 28 regular season games per team
- Number of teams: 8
- Total attendance: 14,897
- Average attendance: 133

Regular season
- First place: MODO Hockey
- Top scorer: Denise Altmann (LHC)
- Relegated to Division 1: HV71

2013 Swedish Championship playoffs
- Finals champions: AIK
- Runners-up: Brynäs IF

Riksserien seasons
- ← 2011–12 2013–14 →

The 2012–13 Riksserien season was the highest tier of women's ice hockey in Sweden. Eight teams competed in the league, with the top six participating in the 2013 Swedish Championship playoffs in women's ice hockey. MODO finished first in the regular season, but were eliminated in the semifinals by Brynäs IF, who would lose in the finals to AIK. The bottom two teams were forced to participate in a qualifier to keep their spots in the league, which resulted in HV71 being demoted to the second-tier league, Division 1.

== Regular season ==
=== Standings ===
Teams 1–2: Qualify for playoffs with bye to semifinals
Teams 3–6: Qualify for playoffs
Teams 7–8: Required to play qualifier to avoid demotion to Allettan

#	Team	GP	W	T	L	GF	GA	GD	TP	OTW	OTL	GWSW	GWSL
1	MODO	28	20	2	6	99	40	+59	62	0	1	0	1
2	AIK	28	18	2	8	97	49	48	57	1	0	0	1
3	Brynäs IF	28	16	5	7	99	52	47	57	3	0	1	1
4	Linköpings HC	28	17	4	7	105	61	44	57	0	2	2	0
5	Munksund-Skuthamns SK	28	12	4	12	105	61	–9	42	0	2	2	0
6	Leksands IF	28	12	2	14	81	76	+5	39	0	1	1	0
7	Segeltorps IF	28	5	3	20	49	104	–55	19	1	1	0	1
8	HV71	28	0	2	26	26	165	–139	3	1	1	0	0

== Swedish Championship playoffs ==
Quarterfinals
3	Brynäs IF	2
6	Leksands IF	1
4	Linköpings HC	2
5	Munksund-Skuthamns SK	0

Semifinals
1	MODO Hockey	1
3	Brynäs IF	2
2	AIK	2
4	Linköpings HC	0

Finals
3	AIK	2
2	Brynäs IF	1

== 2013 Riksserien qualifier ==
The Riksserien qualifier (Swedish: Kval till Riksserien) was contested by the two teams with the best records from the 2012–13 Allettan season and the two teams with the worst records from the 2012–13 Riksserien. The teams played a single round robin tournament with one game between each team. The two team with the best records were qualified for play in the 2013–14 Riksserien season.

IF Sundsvall finished second, and thereby replaced third-placed HV71 in Svenska Serien.

Key
Teams 1–2 play in the 2013–14 Riksserien season
Teams 3–4 play in the 2013–14 Allettan season

#	Team	GP	W	T	L	GF	GA	GD	TP	OTW	OTL	GWSW	GWSL
1	Segeltorps IF	3	2	0	1	7	6	+1	6	0	0	0	0
2	▲IF Sundsvall Hockey	3	2	0	1	6	6	±0	6	0	0	0	0
3	▼HV71	3	1	1	1	7	4	+3	5	0	0	1	0
4	Södertälje SK	3	0	1	2	3	7	–4	1	0	0	0	1
