= Ice hockey at the 2020 Winter Youth Olympics – Girls' tournament =

2020 Winter Youth Olympics – Girls' tournament
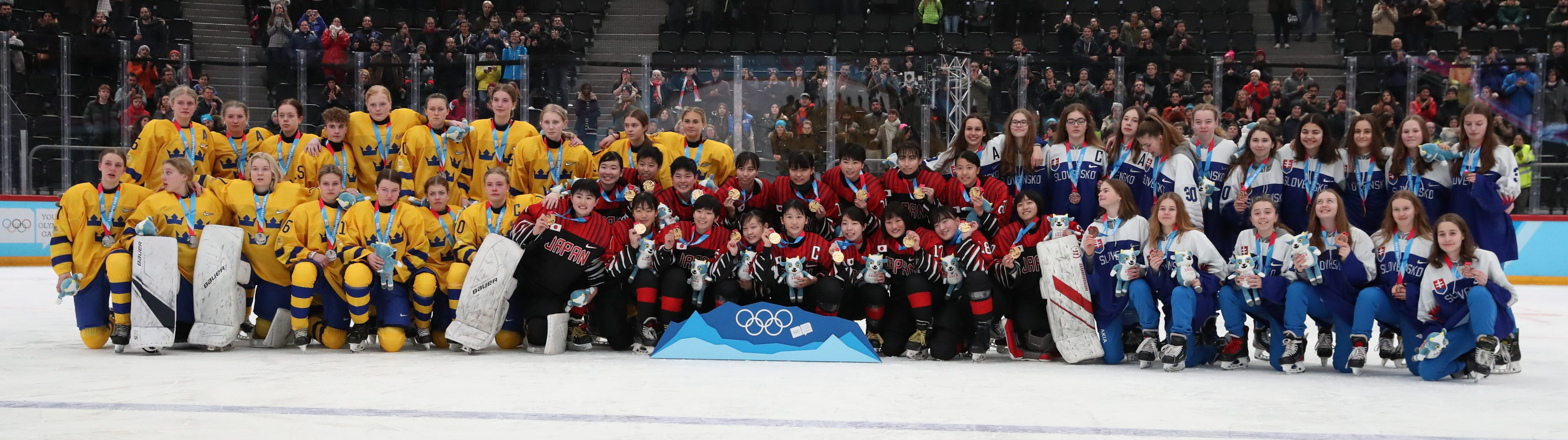

Tournament details
- Host country: Switzerland
- Venue: 1 (in 1 host city)
- Dates: 17–21 January
- Teams: 6

Final positions
- Champions: Japan (1st title)
- Runners-up: Sweden
- Third place: Slovakia
- Fourth place: Switzerland

Tournament statistics
- Games played: 10
- Goals scored: 44 (4.4 per game)
- Attendance: 31,800 (3,180 per game)
- Scoring leader: (Japan) Makoto Ito (12 points)

The girls' ice hockey tournament at the 2020 Winter Youth Olympics was held from 17 to 21 January at the Vaudoise Aréna in Lausanne, Switzerland.

== Preliminary round ==
All times are local (UTC+1).

=== Group A ===
Pos	Team	Pld	W	SOW	SOL	L	GF	GA	GD	Pts	Qualification
1	Sweden	2	1	1	0	0	10	4	+6	5	Semifinals
2	Slovakia	2	1	0	1	0	4	4	0	4	Semifinals
3	Germany	2	0	0	0	2	3	9	−6	0	

Source: Lausanne2020

17 January 2020; 17:00	Sweden	3–2 GWS (1–2, 1–0, 0–0) (SO: 1–0)	Slovakia	Vaudoise aréna Attendance: 1,000

Game reference

Ebba Svensson Träff
Goalies
Laura Medviďová
Referees:
(Switzerland) Melissa Boverio
(Canada) Cianna Lieffers
Linesmen:
(Czech Republic) Kristýna Hájková
(United Kingdom) Philippa Wheeler

	0–1	01:04 – Kapičáková (Hudáková, Dobiášová)
	0–2	03:46 – Belková (Hudáková, Fančovičová) (PP)
Kenttälä (Klaar) – 14:28	1–2
Hjälm (Karlsson) (PP) – 20:33	2–2

Kenttälä (miss)
Karlsson (miss)
Hall
Hall
Shootout
Dobiášová
(miss) Janeková
(miss) Kapičáková
(miss) Dobiášová
9 min
Penalties
4.5 min
33
Shots
20

18 January 2020; 11:00	Germany	2–7 (0–0, 1–4, 1–3)	Sweden	Vaudoise aréna Attendance: 1,300

Game reference

Felicity Luby
Goalies
Tindra Oknefjell
Referees:
(Russia) Elizaveta Kolchina
(United Kingdom) Hollie Neenan
Linesmen:
(Czech Republic) Kristýna Hájková
(Russia) Anastasiia Kurashova

	0–1	17:34 – Perjus (Karlsson)
	0–2	23:31 – Perjus (Hall) (SH)
	0–3	24:45 – Nåtby
Voigt – 26:17	1–3
	1–4	28:09 – Adelbertsson (Wallin)
	1–5	30:11 – Hjälm (Perjus)
Voigt (Mayer, Heyer) – 33:06	2–5
	2–6	37:19 – Simonsen (Hjälm)
	2–7	40:41 – Hall (Hjälm, Perjus)

9 min
Penalties
4.5 min
11
Shots
34

19 January 2020; 17:00	Slovakia	2–1 (0–0, 0–1, 2–0)	Germany	Vaudoise aréna Attendance: 1,100

Game reference

Laura Medviďová
Goalies
Chiara Schultes
Referees:
(Switzerland) Melissa Boverio
(Canada) Cianna Lieffers
Linesmen:
(Canada) Jessica Chartrand
(Czech Republic) Kristýna Hájková

	0–1	22:35 – Häckelsmiller (Heyer, Gottfried)
Donovalová (Stern) – 35:08	1–1
Kapičáková – 39:18	2–1

6 min
Penalties
6 min
21
Shots
14

=== Group B ===
Pos	Team	Pld	W	SOW	SOL	L	GF	GA	GD	Pts	Qualification
1	Japan	2	2	0	0	0	9	2	+7	6	Semifinals
2	Switzerland (H)	2	0	1	0	1	2	5	−3	2	Semifinals
3	Czech Republic	2	0	0	1	1	1	5	−4	1	

Source: Lausanne2020
(H) Host

17 January 2020; 20:00	Czech Republic	0–1 GWS (0–0, 0–0, 0–0) (SO: 0–1)	Switzerland	Vaudoise aréna Attendance: 5,900

Game reference
Michaela Hesová	Goalies	Margaux Favre	Referees: (United States) Melissa Doyle (Russia) Elizaveta Kolchina; Linesmen: (Russia) Anastasiia Kurashova (Sweden) Hanna Persson
Bartáková (miss); Gruntová (miss)	Shootout	Surdez; Marti	Referees: (United States) Melissa Doyle (Russia) Elizaveta Kolchina; Linesmen: (Russia) Anastasiia Kurashova (Sweden) Hanna Persson
7.5 min	Penalties	6 min	Referees: (United States) Melissa Doyle (Russia) Elizaveta Kolchina; Linesmen: (Russia) Anastasiia Kurashova (Sweden) Hanna Persson
23	Shots	11	Referees: (United States) Melissa Doyle (Russia) Elizaveta Kolchina; Linesmen: (Russia) Anastasiia Kurashova (Sweden) Hanna Persson

18 January 2020; 17:00	Japan	4–1 (0–1, 2–0, 2–0)	Czech Republic	Vaudoise aréna Attendance: 2,500

Game reference

Yuzuyu Fujii
Goalies
Michaela Hesová
Referees:
(Switzerland) Melissa Boverio
(United States) Melissa Doyle
Linesmen:
(Canada) Jessica Chartrand
(Sweden) Hanna Persson

	0–1	02:56 – Pištěková
M. Ito – 20:01	1–1
Shimomukai (M. Ito) – 24:14	2–1
Kamada (M. Ito, Shimomukai) – 42:13	3–1
M. Ito (ENG) – 44:12	4–1

1.5 min
Penalties
4.5 min
24
Shots
11

19 January 2020; 11:00	Switzerland	1–5 (0–2, 1–3, 0–0)	Japan	Vaudoise aréna Attendance: 6,600

Game reference

Nadia Häner
Margaux Favre
Goalies
Yuzuyu Fujii
Referees:
(Russia) Elizaveta Kolchina
(United Kingdom) Hollie Neenan
Linesmen:
(Sweden) Hanna Persson
(United Kingdom) Philippa Wheeler

	0–1	08:18 – Tsutsumi (M. Ito)
	0–2	10:47 – Shimomukai (Tsutsumi) (PP)
	0–3	21:40 – Umemori (Tanabe, K. Ito)
	0–4	22:21 – Kamada
	0–5	26:52 – M. Ito (Kamada) (PP)
Bigler – 29:17	1–5

6 min
Penalties
6 min
9
Shots
27

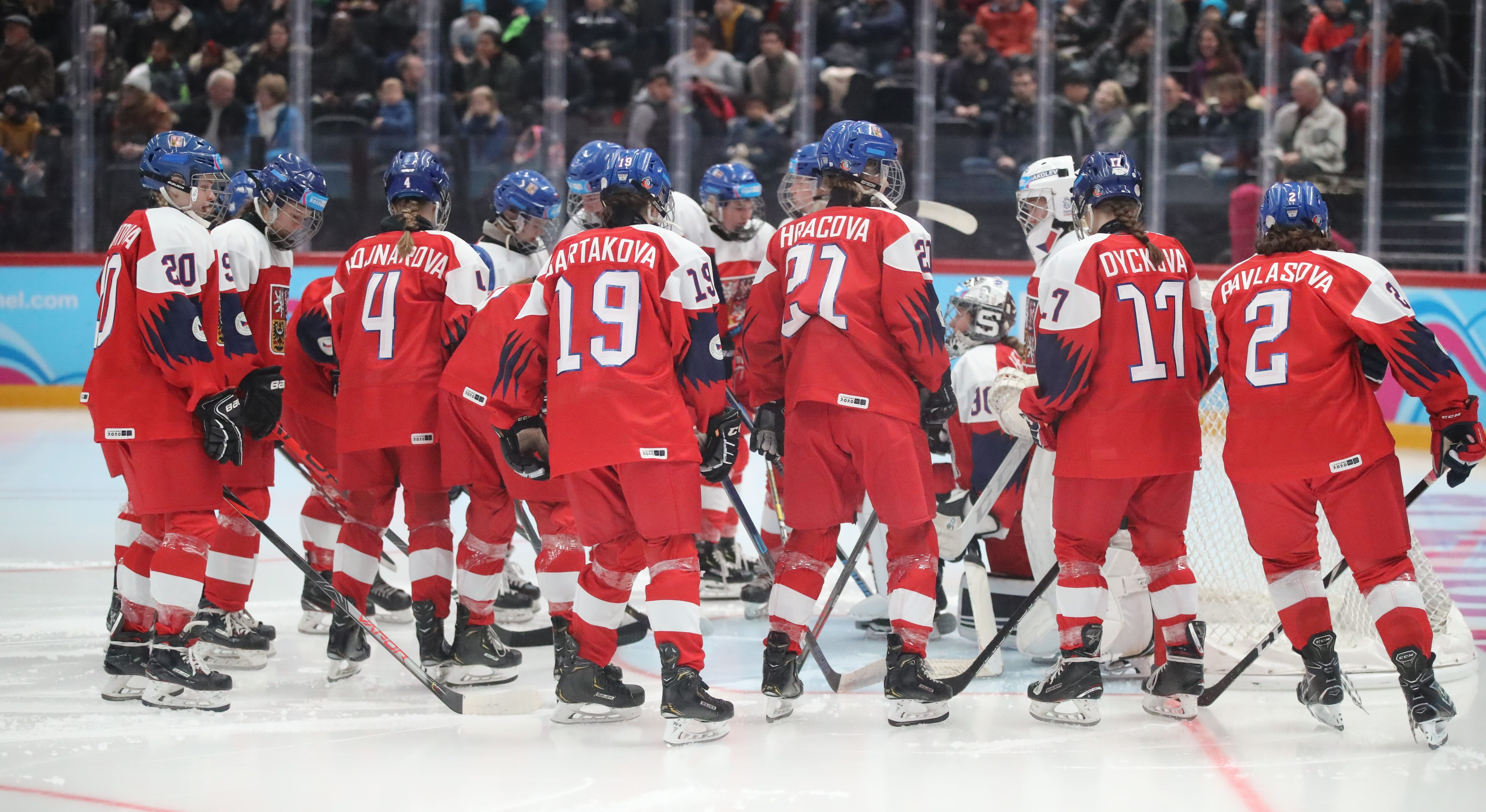
Team Czech Republic

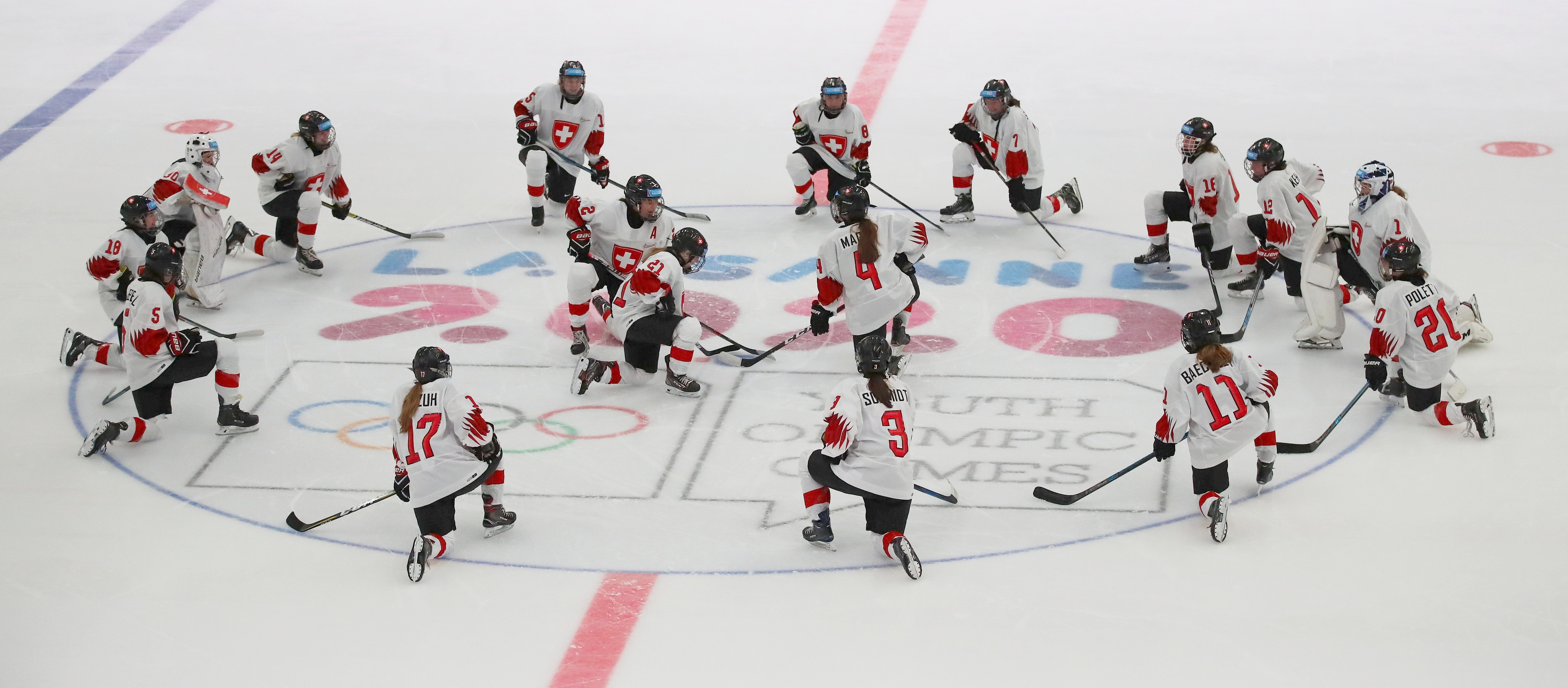
Team Switzerland

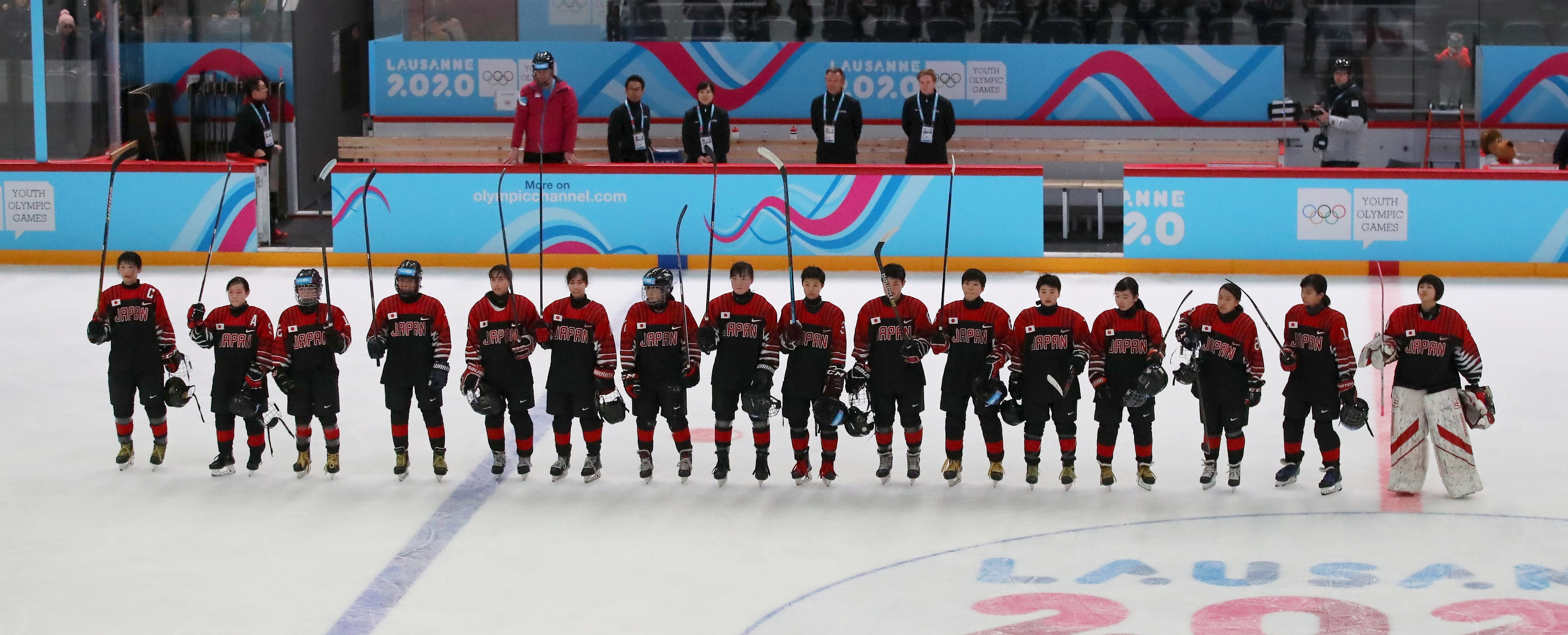
Team Japan

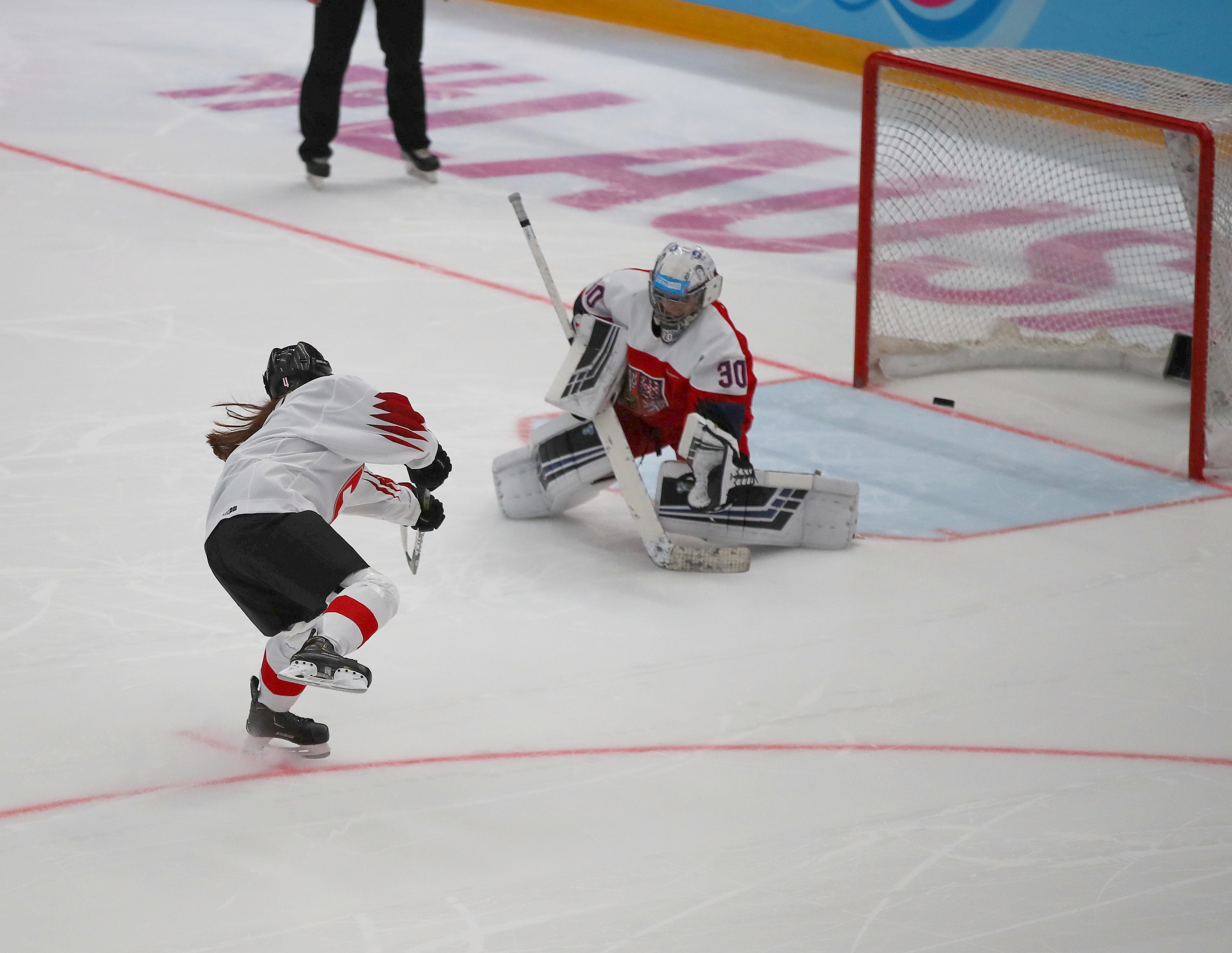
Gamewinning Goal of Team Switzerland in the Shootout versus Team Czech Republic

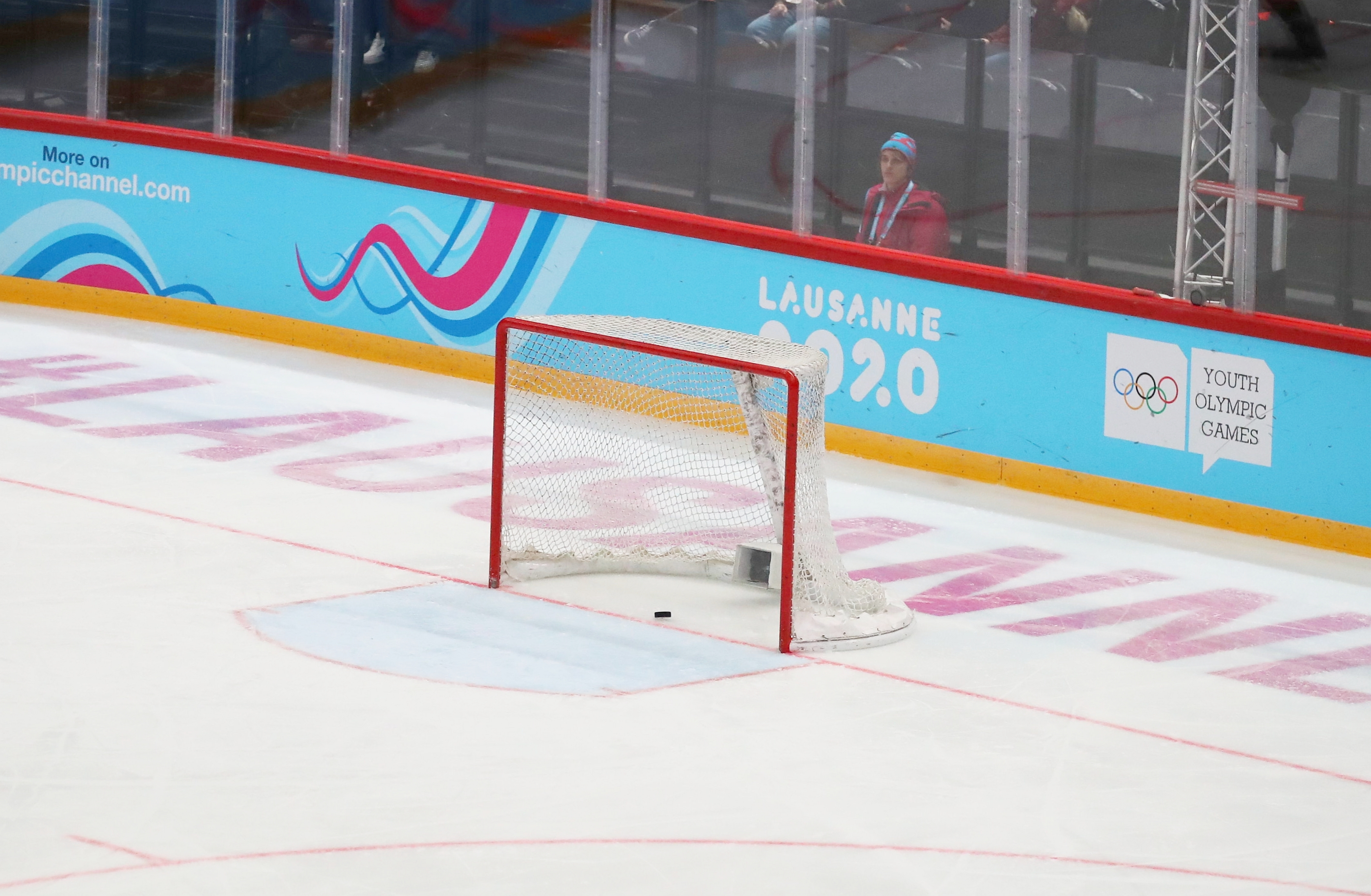
Empty net goal for Team Japan in the match versus Team Czech Republic

== Playoff round ==
=== Bracket ===
Semifinals
20 January
Japan	5
Slovakia	0
20 January
Sweden	2
Switzerland	0

Final
21 January
Japan	4
Sweden	1
Third place
21 January
Slovakia	2
Switzerland	1

=== Semifinals ===
20 January 2020; 11:00	Sweden	2–0 (0–0, 1–0, 1–0)	Switzerland	Vaudoise aréna Attendance: 4,500

Game reference
Ebba Svensson Träff	Goalies	Margaux Favre	Referees: (Canada) Cianna Lieffers (United Kingdom) Hollie Neenan; Linesmen: (Russia) Anastasiia Kurashova (United Kingdom) Philippa Wheeler
Andersson (Hjälm, Hall) (PP) – 20:32 / 1–0; Andersson (Kenttälä) (EA) – 34:10 / 2–0			Referees: (Canada) Cianna Lieffers (United Kingdom) Hollie Neenan; Linesmen: (Russia) Anastasiia Kurashova (United Kingdom) Philippa Wheeler
4.5 min	Penalties	4.5 min	Referees: (Canada) Cianna Lieffers (United Kingdom) Hollie Neenan; Linesmen: (Russia) Anastasiia Kurashova (United Kingdom) Philippa Wheeler
22	Shots	10	Referees: (Canada) Cianna Lieffers (United Kingdom) Hollie Neenan; Linesmen: (Russia) Anastasiia Kurashova (United Kingdom) Philippa Wheeler

20 January 2020; 17:00	Japan	5–0 (2–0, 1–0, 1–0)	Slovakia	Vaudoise aréna Attendance: 800

Game reference

Yuzuyu Fujii
Goalies
Laura Medviďová
Referees:
(Switzerland) Melissa Boverio
(United States) Melissa Doyle
Linesmen:
(Canada) Jessica Chartrand
(Sweden) Hanna Persson

Shimomukai (K. Ito) – 02:33	1–0
Riri Noro (Murakami, Tsutsumi) – 03:26	2–0
M. Ito (Kamada, Sato) – 29:12	3–0
Shimomukai (M. Ito) – 38:28	4–0
Shimomukai (Kamada, M. Ito) – 40:06	5–0

4.5 min
Penalties
6 min
32
Shots
7

=== Bronze medal game ===
21 January 2020; 17:00	(bronze) Slovakia	2–1 (0–0, 2–1, 0–0)	Switzerland	Vaudoise aréna Attendance: 1,500

Game reference

Laura Medviďová
Goalies
Margaux Favre
Referees:
(Russia) Elizaveta Kolchina
(United Kingdom) Hollie Neenan
Linesmen:
(Russia) Anastasiia Kurashova
(United Kingdom) Philippa Wheeler

	0–1	18:38 – Harju (Surdez)
Hudáková (Dobiášová, Kapičáková) – 25:28	1–1
Janeková (Hudáková) (PP) – 26:51	2–1

7.5 min
Penalties
6 min
23
Shots
12

=== Gold medal game ===
21 January 2020; 20:00	(gold) Japan	4–1 (0–1, 1–0, 3–0)	Sweden (silver)	Vaudoise aréna Attendance: 6,600

Game reference

Yuzuyu Fujii
Goalies
Ebba Svensson Träff
Referees:
(United States) Melissa Doyle
(Canada) Cianna Lieffers
Linesmen:
(Canada) Jessica Chartrand
(Czech Republic) Kristýna Hájková

	0–1	14:06 – Hall
Shimomukai (M. Ito, Kamada) – 16:40	1–1
Rio Noro (Riri Noro) – 33:27	2–1
M. Ito (Shimomukai) – 36:16	3–1
Shimomukai (M. Ito, Kamada) (ENG) – 43:23	4–1

6 min
Penalties
7.5 min
25
Shots
11

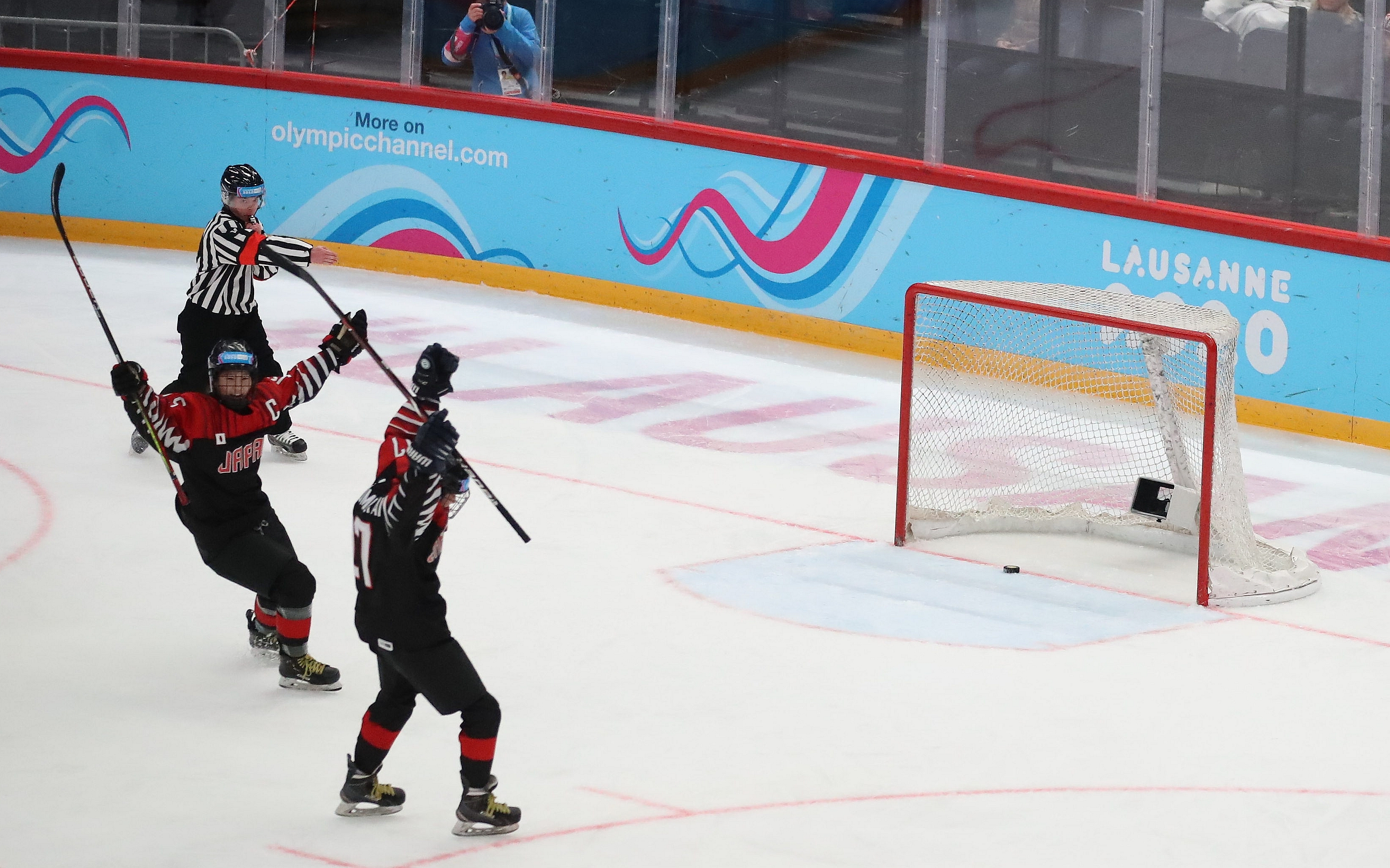
Last goal of the tournament, empty net goal by Hina Shimomukai, Japan, against Sweden in the gold medal match

== Final ranking ==
Pos	Grp	Team	Pld	W	SOW	SOL	L	GF	GA	GD	Pts
1	B	Japan	4	4	0	0	0	18	3	+15	12
2	A	Sweden	4	2	1	0	1	13	8	+5	8
3	A	Slovakia	4	2	0	1	1	6	10	−4	7
4	B	Switzerland (H)	4	0	1	0	3	3	9	−6	2
5	B	Czech Republic	2	0	0	1	1	1	5	−4	1
6	A	Germany	2	0	0	0	2	3	9	−6	0

Source: Lausanne2020
(H) Host
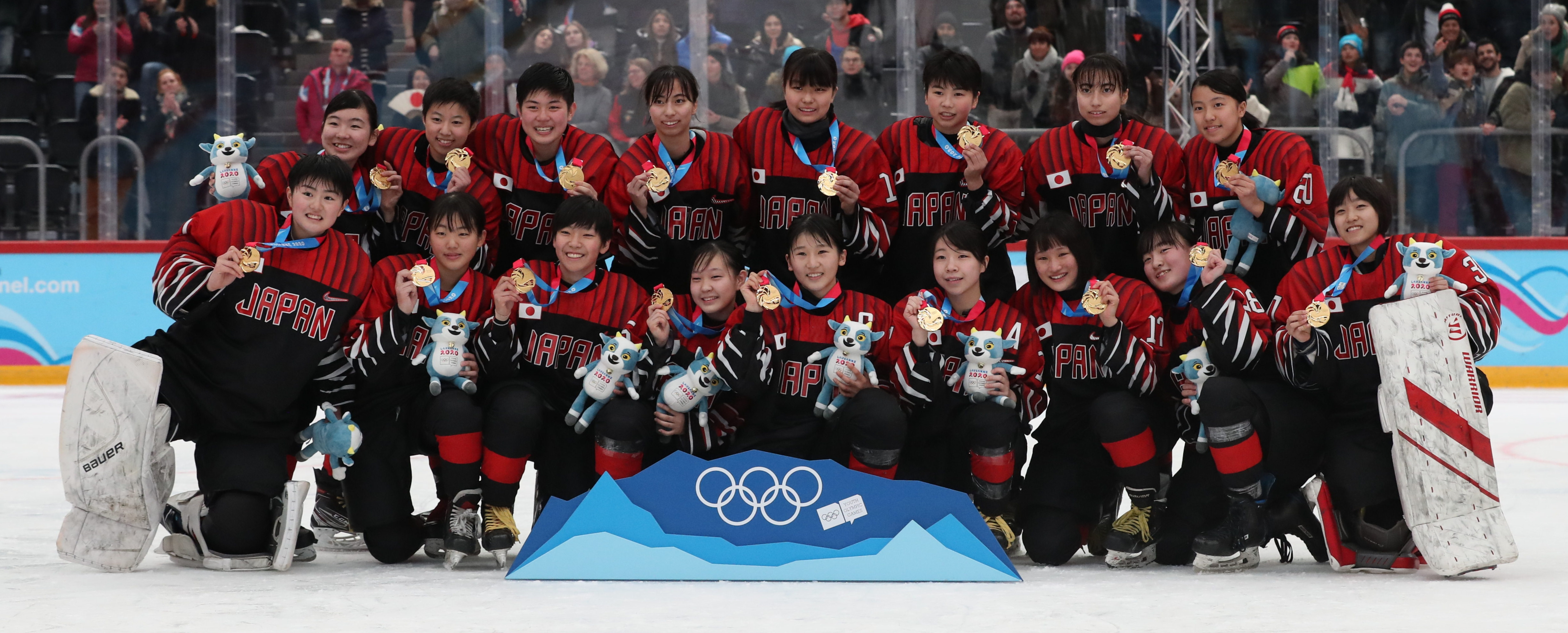
Team Japan,

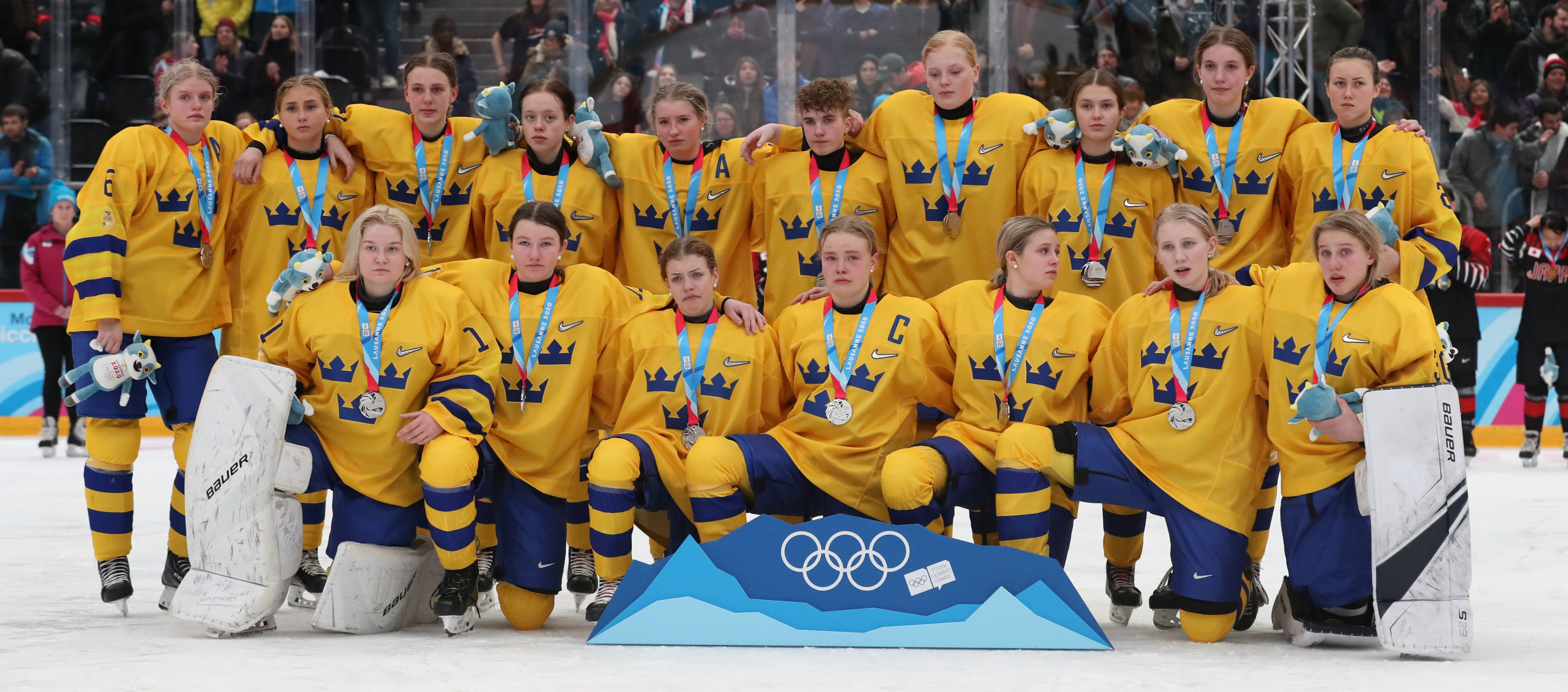
Team Sweden, and

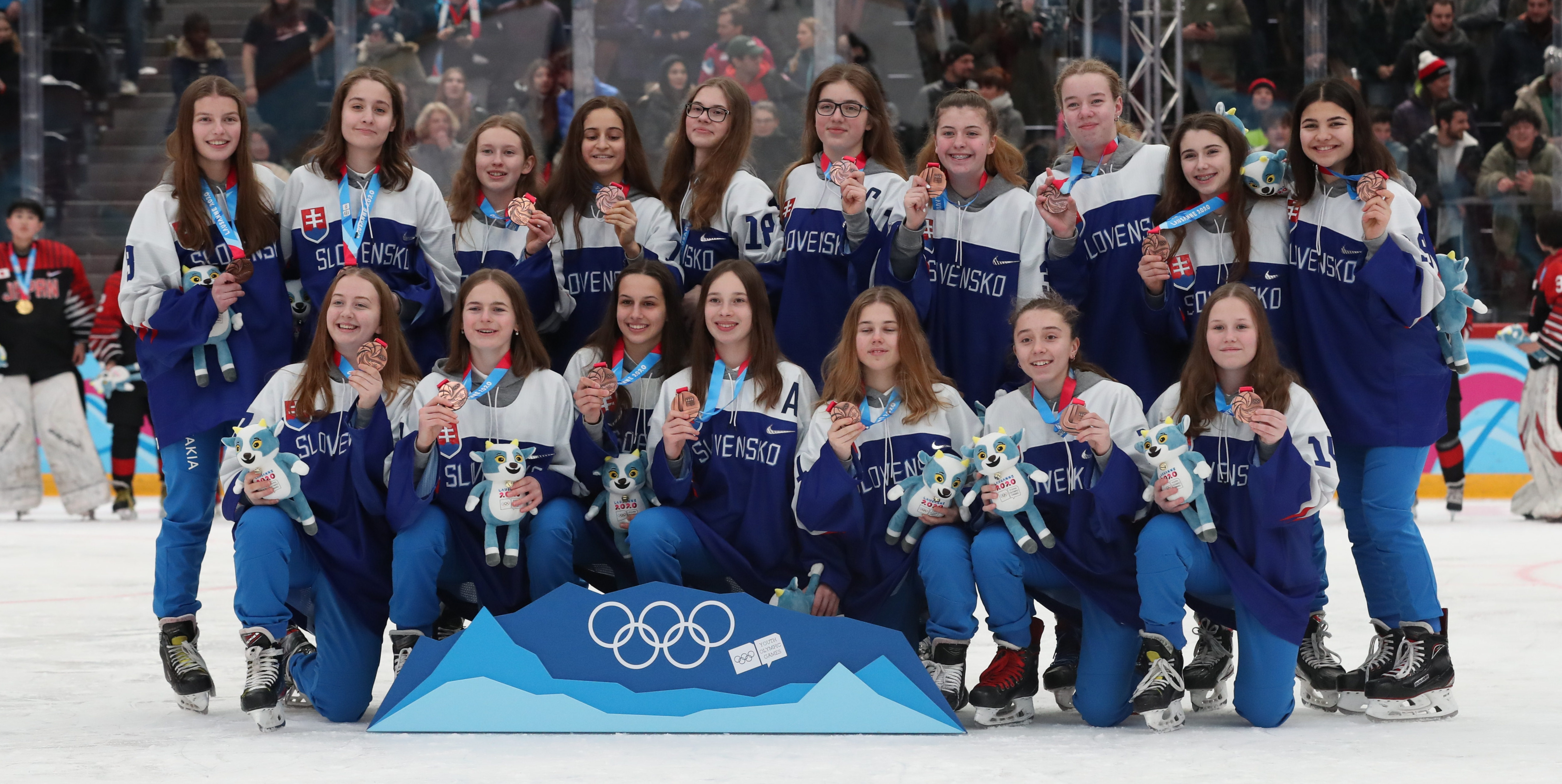
Team Slovakia at the Victory Ceremony
