= 2025–26 Women's Euro Hockey Tour =

International ice hockey tournament season

Tournament details
- Host countries: Switzerland; Sweden; Finland
- Dates: 4-Nations in Kloten; 28–30 August 2025; Lidl Hockey Games; 5–8 November 2025; 4-Nations in Lahti; 10–12 December 2025
- Format: Round-robin
- Teams: 4

Tournament statistics
- Games played: 18
- Goals scored: 82 (4.56 per game)
- Attendance: 8,357 (464 per game)
- Scoring leaders: 4-Nations in Kloten; (Finland) Michelle Karvinen (8); Lidl Hockey Games; (Finland) Emma Nuutinen (3); 4-Nations in Lahti; (Switzerland) Alina Müller (5)
- All statistics correct as of 12 December 2025.

The 2025–26 Women's Euro Hockey Tour was the second Women's Euro Hockey Tour (WEHT) season following the joint commitment of Czechia, Finland, Sweden, and Switzerland to host and participate in the tour through 2028. It was the sixth season since the formal revision and expansion of the tournament format.

The season comprised three tournaments, hosted in Switzerland, Sweden, and Finland, respectively. The national teams of Czechia, Finland, Sweden, and Switzerland participated in all three tournaments. Canada and the United States did not participate in the December tournament in Finland. A four-nation tournament was not held in Czechia during February 2026 due to scheduling conflict with the 2026 Winter Olympics.

== 4-Nations Tournament in Kloten ==
The 2025–26 season began in Switzerland with the 4-Nations Tournament in Kloten during 28 to 30 August 2025. The core WEHT national teams – Czechia, Finland, Switzerland, and Sweden – participated in the tournament. All six games were played at SWISS Arena (previously Stimo Arena) in Kloten, Canton of Zurich.

Finland won each of their three games to claim the first tournament victory of the season. Czechia rallied after a loss to Finland in their first match and ended the tournament with one regulation win and one overtime win to claim second place. Host nation Switzerland secured third place with one win, one overtime loss, and one loss in regulation. Sweden did not record a win in the tournament and finished in last place.

Finnish captain and right winger Michelle Karvinen led the tournament in scoring, with four goals and four assists in three games. Karvinen's linemate and Finnish left winger Elisa Holopainen ranked second, with four goals and three assists, and was recognized as the best forward of the tournament. Swiss centre Alina Müller placed third in scoring, with two goals and three assists. In total, the tournament's top-ten (Note: The tournament's list of top-ten scorers included two players tied for fifth place, two players tied for eighth place, and six players tied for tenth place, resulting in a total of fifteen players ranked within the top-ten.) scorers featured eight Finnish players, four Swiss players, two Czech players, and one Swedish player.

Czech netminder Klára Peslarová (48 shots against) and Finnish netminder Anni Keisala (32 shots against) led the tournament in save percentage, recording 93.8%, respectively. Keisala also led all tournament goaltenders in goals against average, with a 1.00 GAA. Keisala and Swiss goalie Andrea Brändli recorded the only shutouts of the tournament, securing one each.

=== Standings ===
Pos	Team	Pld	W	OTW	OTL	L	GF	GA	GD	Pts
1	Finland	3	3	0	0	0	15	4	+11	9
2	Czechia	3	1	1	0	1	8	9	−1	5
3	Switzerland (H)	3	1	0	1	1	7	9	−2	4
4	Sweden	3	0	0	0	3	3	11	−8	0

Source: Swiss Ice Hockey Federation, Suomen Jääkiekkoliitto
(H) Host

=== Results ===
Game times are local (UTC+2).

28 August 2025; 15:30	Czechia	2–5 (0–1, 2–1, 0–3)	Finland	SWISS Arena, Kloten; Attendance: 111

Michaela Hesová
Klára Peslarová
Goalies
Anni Keisala
Referees:
Mariko Dale
Fabienne Stucki
Linesmen:
Jana Platzer
Jamie Monard

	0–1	12:54 – Holopainen (Karvinen)
Kaltounková (Čajanová, Fromová) – 23:58	1–1
	1–2	25:00 – Holopainen (Karvinen, Tapani)
Vanišová (Mlýnková, Hymlárová) – 32:49	2–2
	2–3	43:12 – PP1 – Karvinen (Holopainen, Savolainen)
	2–4	47:44 – Karvinen (Holopainen, Tapani)
	2–5	52:01 – Holopainen (Rantala, Karvinen)

10 min
Penalties
4 min
21
Shots
31

28 August 2025; 19:00	Switzerland	4–0 (0–0, 1–0, 3–0)	Sweden	SWISS Arena, Kloten; Attendance: 222

Andrea Brändli
Goalies
Emma Söderberg
Referees:
Anneke Orlandini
Reica Staiger
Linesmen:
Jennifer Vicha
Michèle Müller

Müller (Stalder, Wetli) – 37:56	1–0
A. Marti (Leemann) – 44:11	2–0
Enzler (Müller, Vallario) – 53:37	3–0
Zimmermann – EN – 56:07	4–0

6 min
Penalties
8 min
23
Shots
36

29 August 2025; 15:30	Finland	5–2 (0-1, 3-1, 2-0)	Sweden	SWISS Arena, Kloten; Attendance: 59

Emilia Kyrkkö
Goalies
Ebba Svensson Träff
Referees:
Mariko Dale
Fabienne Stucki
Linesmen:
Anina Schüpbach
Tamara Perrin

	0–1	05:25 – Ljungblom (Svensson, L. Johansson)
Liikala (Nylund, Berg) – 22:06	1–1
Vesa (Liikala, Nieminen) – 25:08	2–1
Vainikka (Nylund, Tulus) – 29:27	3–1
	3–2	38:30 – Svensson (Hjalmarsson, L. Johansson)
Tulus (Nylund) – 48:20	4–2
Vainikka (Tulus) – 55:34	5–2

0 min
Penalties
2 min
32
Shots
23

29 August 2025; 19:00	Switzerland	3–4 GWS (2–0, 1–2, 0–1) (OT: 0–0) (SO: 0–1)	Czechia	SWISS Arena, Kloten; Attendance: 251

Saskia Maurer
Goalies
Klára Peslarová
Referees:
Karin Williner
Reica Staiger
Linesmen:
Michèle Müller
Domenica Maurer

Vallario (Müller, Enzler) – 11:45	1–0
Stalder (Müller) – 17:20	2–0
	2–1	32:10 – Čabelová (Mlýnková)
Müller – PP1 – 37:57	3–1
	3–2	39:31 – Kaltounková
	3–3	40:34 – Pejzlová

Wey (miss)
Müller (miss)
Stalder (miss)
Leemann (miss)
Marti
Marti (miss)
Shootout
Kaltounková
(miss) Pejzlová
(miss) Mlýnková
(miss) Vanišová
(miss) Vocetková
Kaltounková
6 min
Penalties
6 min
31
Shots
41

30 August 2025; 13:00	Czechia	2–1 (0–0, 1–1, 1–0)	Sweden	SWISS Arena, Kloten; Attendance: 99

Michaela Hesová
Klára Peslarová
Goalies
Emma Söderberg
Referees:
Anneke Orlandini
Karin Williner
Linesmen:
Anina Schüpbach
Jennifer Salzmann

Přibylová (Vocetková) – 26:39	1–0
	1–1	37:33 – PP1 – Hedqvist (Thuvik, Olsson)
Hymlárová – PP1 – 46:55	2–1

33 min
Penalties
8 min
23
Shots
30

30 August 2025; 17:00	Switzerland	0–5 (0–1, 0–4, 0–0)	Finland	SWISS Arena, Kloten; Attendance: 356

Andrea Brändli
Saskia Maurer
Goalies
Anni Keisala
Referees:
Reica Staiger
Fabienne Stucki
Linesmen:
Maria Hauhia
Domenica Maurer

0–1	03:11 – Holopainen (Karvinen, Tapani)
0–2	21:55 – Yrjölä (Havana, Schalin)
0–3	26:29 – Karvinen (Tapani, Holopainen)
0–4	28:32 – Nieminen (Liikala)
0–5	28:58 – Karvinen (Holopainen, Laitinen)

2 min
Penalties
4 min
13
Shots
39

Top scorers
The top-ten point scorers of the tournament. Note that two players tied for fifth place, two players tied for eighth place, and six players tied for tenth place, resulting in a total of fifteen players included in the table.

	Player	GP	G	A	Pts	PIM
(Finland)	Michelle Karvinen	3	4	4	8	0
(Finland)	Elisa Holopainen	3	4	3	7	2
(Switzerland)	Alina Müller	3	2	3	5	0
(Finland)	Susanna Tapani	3	0	5	5	2
(Finland)	Julia Liikala	3	1	2	3	0
(Finland)	Noora Tulus	3	1	2	3	0
(Finland)	Jenniina Nylund	3	0	3	3	0
(Czech Republic)	Kristýna Kaltounková	3	2	0	2	2
(Finland)	Viivi Vainikka	3	2	0	2	0
(Switzerland)	Rahel Enzler	3	1	1	2	0
(Czech Republic)	Klára Hymlárová	3	1	1	2	2
(Finland)	Petra Nieminen	3	1	1	2	0
(Switzerland)	Lara Stalder	3	1	1	2	2
(Sweden)	Elin Svensson	3	1	1	2	2
(Switzerland)	Nicole Vallario	3	1	1	2	2

Goaltenders

	Player	GP	TOI	W	L	SA	GA	SO	Sv%	GAA
(Czech Republic)	Klára Peslarová	3	98:04	0	0	48	3	0	93.8	1.84
(Finland)	Anni Keisala	2	120:00	2	0	32	2	1	93.8	1.00
(Switzerland)	Andrea Brändli	2	88:32	1	1	60	4	1	93.3	2.71
(Switzerland)	Saskia Maurer	2	96:28	0	0	63	5	0	92.1	3.11
(Finland)	Emilia Kyrkkö	1	60:00	1	0	22	2	0	90.9	2.00
(Sweden)	Emma Söderberg	2	117:59	0	2	45	5	0	88.9	2.54
(Czech Republic)	Michaela Hesová	2	84:51	1	1	48	6	0	87.5	4.24
(Sweden)	Ebba Svensson Träff	1	60:00	0	1	30	5	0	83.3	5.00

Source: Swiss Ice Hockey Federation, Suomen Jääkiekkoliitto

=== Player awards ===
- Best Defender: (Finland) Ronja Savolainen
- Best Forward: (Finland) Elisa Holopainen

Players of the Game

- Czechia vs Finland: Vendula Přibylová (CZE), Elisa Holopainen (FIN)
- Switzerland vs Sweden: unknown
- Finland vs Sweden: Jenniina Nylund (FIN), Sara Hjalmarsson (SWE)
- Switzerland vs Czechia: unknown
- Czechia vs Sweden: unknown
- Switzerland vs Finland: Alina Müller (SUI), Michelle Karvinen (FIN)

== Lidl Hockey Games ==
The second tournament of the 2025–26 season was the Lidl Hockey Games in Ängelholm, Sweden during 5 to 8 November 2025. Also known as the 4-Nations Tournament in Ängelholm, the tournament was played at Catena Arena in Ängelholm.

=== Standings ===
Pos	Team	Pld	W	OTW	OTL	L	GF	GA	GD	Pts
1	Finland	3	2	1	0	0	8	3	+5	8
2	Sweden (H)	3	1	0	2	0	6	5	+1	5
3	Czechia	3	1	0	0	2	3	8	−5	3
4	Switzerland	3	0	1	0	2	3	4	−1	2

Source: Swedish Ice Hockey Association
(H) Host

=== Results ===
Game times are local (UTC+2).

5 November 2025; 16:00	Finland	2–1 (0–0, 1–0, 1–1)	Switzerland	Catena Arena, Ängelholm; Attendance: 105

Anni Keisala
Goalies
Chiara Pfosi
Referee:
Kristoffer Folkstrand
Linesman:
Jessica Lundgren

Vainikka (Rantala, Berg) – 29:13	1–0
	1–1	44:09 – Herzig (Waser, Tenenbaum)
Tapani (Karvinen, Holopainen) – PP2 – 47:43	2–1

4 min
Penalties
8 min
34
Shots
11

5 November 2025; 20:00	Czechia	1–4 (0–0, 1–1, 0–3)	Sweden	Catena Arena, Ängelholm; Attendance: 931

Daniela Nováková
Goalies
Ebba Svensson Träff
Referees:
Veronica Lovensnö
Sabina Küller
Linesmen:
Tova Andersson
Elva Hjálmarsdóttir

	0–1	26:33 – Karlsson (H. Svensson, Olsson)
Přibylová (Čabelová, Nováková) – 32:49	1–1
	1–2	42:55 – H. Svensson (Andersson)
	1–3	49:45 – PP – Hallin (H. Svensson, Ljungblom)
	1–4	58:08 – EN – Hall

6 min
Penalties
8 min
29
Shots
23

7 November 2025; 15:00	Finland	4–1 (1–1, 1–0, 2–0)	Czechia	Catena Arena, Ängelholm; Attendance: 172

Sanni Ahola
Goalies
Klára Peslarová
Referees:
Veronica Lovensnö
Sabina Küller
Linesmen:
Julia Hjelmström
Tova Andersson

Nuutinen – 01:07	1–0
	1–1	05:51 – Kaltounková (Tejralová)
Karvinen (Tapani, Hiirikoski) – PP – 36:09	2–1
Kuoppala (Ekoluoma) – EN – 59:13	3–1
Nuutinen (Tulus) – EN – 59:48	4–1

4 min
Penalties
6 min
30
Shots
13

7 November 2025; 19:00	Sweden	1–2 GWS (0-0, 1–0, 0–1) (OT: 0–0) (SO: 0–1)	Switzerland	Catena Arena, Ängelholm; Attendance: 977

Tindra Holm	Goalies	Monja Wagner	Referees: Anna Hammar; Natalie Bertl; Linesmen: Elva Hjálmarsdóttir; Wilma Westlund
Johansson (Jungåker, Karlsson) – 23:31 / 1–0; / 1–1 / 56:31 – Balzer (Sigrist, Rüedi)			Referees: Anna Hammar; Natalie Bertl; Linesmen: Elva Hjálmarsdóttir; Wilma Westlund
Svensson (miss); Olsson (miss); Jungåker (miss); Wikner-Zienkiewicz (miss); Hjalmarsson (miss); Ljungblom (miss)	Shootout	(miss) Balzer; (miss) Müller; (miss) Wey; (miss) Marti; (miss) Herzig; Lutz	Referees: Anna Hammar; Natalie Bertl; Linesmen: Elva Hjálmarsdóttir; Wilma Westlund
10 min	Penalties	10 min	Referees: Anna Hammar; Natalie Bertl; Linesmen: Elva Hjálmarsdóttir; Wilma Westlund
36	Shots	18	Referees: Anna Hammar; Natalie Bertl; Linesmen: Elva Hjálmarsdóttir; Wilma Westlund

8 November 2025; 12:30	Switzerland	0–1 (0–1, 0–0, 0–0)	Czechia	Catena Arena, Ängelholm; Attendance: 281

Monja Wagner; Chiara Pfosi	Goalies	Julie Pejšová	Referees: Anna Hammar; Natalie Bertl; Linesmen: Elva Hjálmarsdóttir; Wilma Westlund
0–1 / 14:39 – Juříčková (Čabelová, Seroiszková)			Referees: Anna Hammar; Natalie Bertl; Linesmen: Elva Hjálmarsdóttir; Wilma Westlund
4 min	Penalties	6 min	Referees: Anna Hammar; Natalie Bertl; Linesmen: Elva Hjálmarsdóttir; Wilma Westlund
10	Shots	45	Referees: Anna Hammar; Natalie Bertl; Linesmen: Elva Hjálmarsdóttir; Wilma Westlund

8 November 2025; 17:00	Sweden	1–2 OT (0–0, 1–1, 0–0) (OT: 0–1)	Finland	Catena Arena, Ängelholm; Attendance: 2,979

Ebba Svensson Träff
Goalies
Sanni Ahola
Referees:
Sabina Küller
Veronica Lovensnö
Linesmen:
Julia Hjelmström
Tova Andersson

Hallin (Lundin, Waxin) – 27:44	1–0
	1–1	32:43 – Nuutinen (Tulus, Savolainen)
	1–2	60:52 – Holopainen (Vanhanen)

8 min
Penalties
4 min
14
Shots
33

Top scorers
The top-ten point scorers of the tournament. Note that four players tied for fourth place, two players tied for eighth place, and ten players tied for tenth place, resulting in a total of nineteen players included in the table.

	Player	GP	G	A	Pts	PIM
(Finland)	Emma Nuutinen	3	3	0	3	2
(Sweden)	Hilda Svensson	3	1	2	3	2
(Sweden)	Mira Hallin	3	2	0	2	0
(Finland)	Elisa Holopainen	3	1	1	2	0
(Sweden)	Ida Karlsson	3	1	1	2	2
(Finland)	Michelle Karvinen	3	1	1	2	0
(Finland)	Susanna Tapani	3	1	1	2	0
(Czech Republic)	Anežka Čabelová	3	0	2	2	2
(Finland)	Noora Tulus	3	0	2	2	0
(Switzerland)	Leoni Balzer	3	1	0	1	0
(Sweden)	Nicole Hall	3	1	0	1	0
(Switzerland)	Naemi Herzig	3	1	0	1	0
(Sweden)	Thea Johansson	3	1	0	1	0
(Czech Republic)	Barbora Juříčková	3	1	0	1	0
(Czech Republic)	Kristýna Kaltounková	3	1	0	1	2
(Finland)	Ida Kuoppala	3	1	0	1	0
(Switzerland)	Lena Lutz	3	1	0	1	0
(Czech Republic)	Vendula Přibylová	3	1	0	1	0
(Finland)	Viivi Vainikka	3	1	0	1	0

Goaltenders

	Player	GP	TOI	W	L	SOG	GA	SO	Sv%	GAA
(Czech Republic)	Julie Pejšová	1	60:00	1	0	10	0	1	100.00	0.00
(Switzerland)	Monja Wagner	2	95:00	0	1	61	2	0	96.72	1.26
(Switzerland)	Chiara Pfosi	2	88:38	0	1	54	2	0	96.30	1.35
(Sweden)	Ebba Svensson Träff	2	120:52	1	1	62	3	0	95.16	1.44
(Sweden)	Tindra Holm	1	65:00	1	0	17	1	0	94.12	0.92
(Czech Republic)	Klára Peslarová	1	58:56	0	1	28	2	0	92.86	2.04
(Finland)	Sanni Ahola	2	120:52	2	0	27	2	0	92.59	0.96
(Finland)	Anni Keisala	1	60:00	1	0	11	1	0	90.91	1.00
(Czech Republic)	Daniela Nováková	1	57:56	0	1	22	3	0	86.36	3.11

Source: Svenska Ishockeyförbundet, Suomen Jääkiekkoliitto

== 4-Nations Tournament in Lahti ==
The season concluded with the 4 Nations Tournament in Lahti in Lahti and Hämeenlinna, Finland during 10 to 12 December 2025. Matches held on 10 and 11 December were played at Wemasto Areena in Lahti and matches held on 12 December were played at Hämeenlinna Ice Hall in Hämeenlinna.

=== Standings ===
Pos	Team	Pld	W	OTW	OTL	L	GF	GA	GD	Pts
1	Sweden	3	2	0	0	1	10	6	+4	6
2	Czechia	3	2	0	0	1	8	4	+4	6
3	Switzerland	3	1	0	0	2	7	10	−3	3
4	Finland (H)	3	1	0	0	2	6	11	−5	3

Source: Suomen Jääkiekkoliitto
(H) Host

=== Results ===
10 December 2025; 15:00	Czechia	2–1 (1–0, 0–0, 1–1)	Switzerland	Wemasto Areena, Lahti; Attendance: 75

Michaela Hesová
Goalies
Andrea Brändli
Referees:
Linnea Marin
Mia Järvinen
Linesmen:
Eleonoora Mikkonen
Ilona Silander

Pejzlová (Plosová, Křížová) – 09:58	1–0
Hymlárová (Čajanová, Přibylová) – 58:14	2–0
	2–1	59:28 – Marti (Wey)

6 min
Penalties
10 min
33
Shots
19

10 December 2025; 19:00	Finland	3–2 (0–1, 2–0, 1–1)	Sweden	Wemasto Areena, Lahti; Attendance: 557

Emilia Kyrkkö
Goalies
Emma Söderberg
Referees:
Veera Lyytikäinen
Reetta-Kaisa Lusi
Linesmen:
Anni Kankkunen
Helinä Anttila

	0–1	01:25 – Bouveng
Nieminen (Kuoppala) – 23:29	1–1
Nuutinen (Hiirikoski, Vanhanen) – 38:04	2–1
Kaila (Nieminen, Yrjölä) – 44:58	3–1
	3–2	55:08 – T. Johansson (Olsson

4 min
Penalties
6 min
19
Shots
35

11 December 2025; 15:00	Sweden	3–1 (2–0, 0–0, 1–1)	Czechia	Wemasto Areena, Lahti; Attendance: 54

Ebba Svensson Träff
Goalies
Klára Peslarová
Referees:
Salla-Maaria Raitala
Veera Lyytikäinen
Linesmen:
Ilona Silander
Helinä Anttila

H. Svensson (T. Johansson) – 07:55	1–0
Raunio (Hjalmarsson, Jungåker) – PP2 – 10:07	2–0
	2–1	51:16 – Pejšová (Neubauerová, Křížová)
T. Johansson – EN – 59:37	3–1

6 min
Penalties
10 min
30
Shots
25

11 December 2025; 19:00	Finland	3–4 (1–2, 1–0, 1–2)	Switzerland	Wemasto Areena, Lahti; Attendance: 481

Kiia Lahtinen
Goalies
Saskia Maurer
Referees:
Kaisa Ketonen
Mia Järvinen
Linesmen:
Anni Kankkunen
Aino Ranki

	0–1	01:59 – Stalder (Müller)
	0–2	03:27 – Lutz (Schaefer)
Vanhanen (Kuoppala, Liikala) – DP – 11:23	1–2
Parkkonen (Kuoppala, Laitinen) – 35:59	2–2
	2–3	40:34 – Müller (Stalder)
Nylund (Nuutinen, Laitinen) – PP – 42:32	3–3
	3–4	59:09 – Müller

2 min
Penalties
4 min
30
Shots
23

12 December 2025; 14:00	Switzerland	2–5 (1–2, 1–1, 0–2)	Sweden	Hämeenlinna Ice Hall, Hämeenlinna; Attendance: 58

Monja Wagner
Goalies
Ebba Svensson Träff
Referees:
Linnea Marin
Kaisa Ketonen
Linesmen:
Aino Ranki
Ilona Silander

	0–1	02:10 – Lundin (Hallin)
Stalder (Müller, Enzler) – PP – 07:26	1–1
	1–2	09:20 – Hjalmarsson (Thuvik, L. Johansson)
	1–3	27:48 – T. Johansson (Olsson)
Enzler (Stalder, Müller) – PP – 31:25	2–3
	2–4	46:13 – H. Svensson (T. Johansson, Karlsson)
	2–5	58:37 – EN – L. Johansson

2 min
Penalties
6 min
18
Shots
28

12 December 2025; 18:00	Finland	0–5 (0–2, 0–0, 0–3)	Czechia	Hämeenlinna Ice Hall, Hämeenlinna; Attendance: 589

Emilia Kyrkkö
Goalies
Julie Pejšová
Referees:
Salla-Maaria Raitala
Reetta-Kaisa Lusi
Linesmen:
Julia Halme
Eleonoora Mikkonen

0–1	12:31 – Kaltounková (Hymlárová)
0–2	19:23 – Křížová (Pejšová, Pejzlová)
0–3	44:21 – Plosová (Křížová)
0–4	45:52 – Přibylová
0–5	53:06 – Vocetková (Juříčková)

4 min
Penalties
4 min
16
Shots
26

Top scorers
The following table lists the top-ten point scorers of the tournament. Note that two players tied for second place and eleven players tied for seventh place, resulting in a total of seventeen players included in the table.

	Player	GP	G	A	Pts	PIM
(Switzerland)	Alina Müller	3	2	3	5	2
(Sweden)	Thea Johansson	3	2	2	4	2
(Switzerland)	Lara Stalder	3	2	2	4	0
(Czech Republic)	Denisa Křížová	3	1	3	4	0
(Sweden)	Hilda Svensson	3	3	0	3	0
(Finland)	Ida Kuoppala	3	0	3	3	0
(Switzerland)	Rahel Enzler	3	1	1	2	0
(Sweden)	Sara Hjalmarsson	3	1	1	2	0
(Czech Republic)	Klára Hymlárová	3	1	1	2	2
(Sweden)	Lisa Johansson	3	1	1	2	0
(Finland)	Petra Nieminen	3	1	1	2	2
(Finland)	Emma Nuutinen	3	1	1	2	0
(Czech Republic)	Daniela Pejšová	3	1	1	2	2
(Czech Republic)	Michaela Pejzlová	3	1	1	2	0
(Czech Republic)	Tereza Plosová	3	1	1	2	2
(Czech Republic)	Vendula Přibylová	3	1	1	2	0
(Finland)	Sanni Vanhanen	3	1	1	2	0

Goaltenders

	Player	GP	TOI	W	L	SOG	GA	SO	Sv%	GAA
(Czech Republic)	Julie Pejšová	1	60:00	1	0	16	0	1	100.00	0.00
(Czech Republic)	Michaela Hesová	1	60:00	1	0	19	1	0	94.7	1.00
(Switzerland)	Andrea Brändli	1	59:10	0	1	33	2	0	93.9	2.03
(Czech Republic)	Klára Peslarová	1	58:37	0	1	29	2	0	93.1	2.05
(Sweden)	Ebba Svensson Träff	2	120:00	2	0	43	3	0	93.0	1.50
(Switzerland)	Saskia Maurer	1	60:00	1	0	30	3	0	90.0	3.00
(Finland)	Emilia Kyrkkö	2	120:00	1	1	61	7	0	88.5	3.50
(Switzerland)	Monja Wagner	1	59:25	0	1	27	4	0	85.2	4.04
(Sweden)	Emma Söderberg	1	58:53	0	1	19	3	0	84.2	3.06
(Finland)	Kiia Lahtinen	1	59:35	0	1	23	4	0	82.6	4.03

Source: Suomen Jääkiekkoliitto

=== Player awards ===
Players of the Game
Each national team recognized its best player of each game as selected by their teammates.

- Czechia vs Switzerland: Barbora Juříčková (CZE), Andrea Brändli (SUI)
- Finland vs Sweden: Emilia Kyrkkö (FIN), Thea Johansson (SWE)
- Sweden vs Czechia: Ebba Svensson Träff (SWE), Kateřina Mrázová (CZE)
- Finland vs Switzerland: Ida Kuoppala (FIN), Lara Stalder (SUI)
- Switzerland vs Sweden: Alina Müller (SUI), Sara Hjalmarsson (SWE)
- Finland vs Czechia: Sanni Vanhanen (FIN), Denisa Křížová (CZE)
