= 2022 IIHF U18 Women's World Championship =

Hockey competition

Tournament details
- Host country: United States
- Venue(s): LaBahn Arena (Madison); Bob Suter's Capitol Ice Arena (Middleton)
- Dates: 6–13 June 2022
- Teams: 8

Final positions
- Champions: Canada (6th title)
- Runners-up: United States
- Third place: Finland
- Fourth place: Sweden

Tournament statistics
- Games played: 21
- Goals scored: 105 (5 per game)
- Attendance: 22,481 (1,071 per game)
- Scoring leader: (Czech Republic) Tereza Plosová (10 points)

Awards
- MVP: (United States) Laila Edwards

The 2022 IIHF U18 Women's World Championship was the 14th IIHF U18 Women's World Championship in ice hockey.

On December 24, 2021, the tournament was cancelled for the second year in a row by the International Ice Hockey Federation (IIHF) due to the COVID-19 pandemic. However, on March 21, 2022, the IIHF announced it had reconsidered and rescheduled the Top Division tournament for June 6–13, 2022 in Madison, Wisconsin, United States.

The venues which hosted the event in Dane County, Wisconsin were LaBahn Arena, located on the campus of the University of Wisconsin in Madison and Bob Suter's Capitol Ice Arena in Middleton, home of the USHL's Madison Capitols.

== Top Division ==
=== Preliminary round ===
All times are local (UTC−5).

==== Group A ====
Pos	Team	Pld	W	OTW	OTL	L	GF	GA	GD	Pts	Qualification
1	United States (H)	3	3	0	0	0	18	1	+17	9	Semifinals
2	Finland	3	1	0	0	2	5	9	−4	3 (Note: Finland 3 Pts, +1 GD; Canada 3 Pts, 0 GD; Sweden 3 Pts, –1 GD)	Semifinals
3	Canada	3	1	0	0	2	3	10	−7	3	Quarterfinals
4	Sweden	3	1	0	0	2	6	12	−6	3	Quarterfinals
−	Russia	0	0	0	0	0	0	0	0	0	Expelled

Source: IIHF
Rules for classification: 1) points; 2) head-to-head points; 3) head-to-head goal difference; 4) head-to-head number of goals scored; 5) result against closest best-ranked team outside tied teams; 6) result against second-best ranked team outside tied teams; 7) seeding before tournament.
(H) Host
Notes:

6 June 2022; 16:00	Canada	0–2 (0–0, 0–1, 0–1)	Finland	LaBahn Arena, Madison; Attendance: 1,035

Game reference
Hailey MacLeod	Goalies	Emilia Kyrkkö	Referees: (United States) Charlotte Hurley (Canada) Amy Martin; Linesmen: (Switzerland) Magali Anex dit Chenaud (Slovakia) Eva Mária Moleková
0–1 / 37:49 – Eronen (Kuoppala); 0–2 / 45:52 – Havana (Yrjölä, Schalin) (PP2)			Referees: (United States) Charlotte Hurley (Canada) Amy Martin; Linesmen: (Switzerland) Magali Anex dit Chenaud (Slovakia) Eva Mária Moleková
12 min	Penalties	4 min	Referees: (United States) Charlotte Hurley (Canada) Amy Martin; Linesmen: (Switzerland) Magali Anex dit Chenaud (Slovakia) Eva Mária Moleková
40	Shots	17	Referees: (United States) Charlotte Hurley (Canada) Amy Martin; Linesmen: (Switzerland) Magali Anex dit Chenaud (Slovakia) Eva Mária Moleková

6 June 2022; 20:00	Sweden	1–6 (0–4, 0–1, 1–1)	United States	LaBahn Arena, Madison; Attendance: 1,071

Game reference

Ebba Svensson Träff
Goalies
Annelies Bergmann
Referees:
(Czech Republic) Gabriela Malá
(Canada) Michelle Stapleton
Linesmen:
(Canada) Laura Gutauskas
(Hungary) Adrienn Paulheim

	0–1	03:09 – Edwards (Simms, Dwyer) (PP)
	0–2	08:30 – Hall (Edwards, Simms)
	0–3	09:17 – Hall (Morrow, Dwyer)
	0–4	17:18 – St. Martin (Scannell)
	0–5	37:55 – Biederman (Hall, Morrow) (SH)
Hedqvist (Adelbertsson) (PP) – 41:23	1–5
	1–6	55:12 – Janecke (Morrow, Edwards) (PP)

14 min
Penalties
14 min
21
Shots
47

7 June 2022; 16:00	Canada	3–1 (2–0, 1–1, 0–0)	Sweden	LaBahn Arena, Madison; Attendance: 896

Game reference

Mari Pietersen
Goalies
Lisa Jönsson
Referees:
(United States) Jenna Janshen
(Germany) Svenja Strohmenger
Linesmen:
(Switzerland) Magali Anex dit Chenaud
(Finland) Johanna Oksanen

Kirchmair (Murphy, Henderson) – 02:28	1–0
Hicks (Aubin, Baxter) – 19:03	2–0
Hicks – 34:52	3–0
	3–1	36:45 – Kandell (Pfeffer, Hedqvist) (PP)

14 min
Penalties
10 min
56
Shots
34

7 June 2022; 20:00	United States	5–0 (2–0, 0–0, 3–0)	Finland	LaBahn Arena, Madison; Attendance: 944

Game reference

Ava McNaughton
Goalies
Hannele Tarkiainen
Referees:
(Canada) Amy Martin
(Canada) Michelle Stapleton
Linesmen:
(United States) Sarah Buckner
(Canada) Erin Zach

Edwards (Janecke, Morrow) (PP) – 06:48	1–0
Janecke – 13:42	2–0
McCarthy – 55:48	3–0
Janecke (Morrow, Simms) (PP) – 57:04	4–0
Edwards (Simms, Janecke) – 57:15	5–0

2 min
Penalties
6 min
47
Shots
11

9 June 2022; 16:00	Finland	3–4 (1–2, 1–0, 1–2)	Sweden	LaBahn Arena, Madison; Attendance: 2,121

Game reference

Emilia Kyrkkö
Goalies
Lisa Jönsson
Referees:
(Japan) Anna Kuroda
(United States) Sara Strong
Linesmen:
(United States) Sarah Buckner
(Germany) Julia Mannlein

	0–1	10:43 – Karlsson (Kandell, Raunio (PP)
Schalin (Havana, Yrjölä) – 14:54	1–1
	1–2	17:23 – Markström (Kandell)
Makkonen (Vanhanen, Kuoppala) – 30:05	2–2
Salonen (Vanhanen, Yrjölä) – 45:00	3–2
	3–3	57:50 – Pfeffer (Karlsson, Kandell) (EA)
	3–4	59:52 – Raunio (Markström, Hall) (EA)

6 min
Penalties
4 min
27
Shots
25

9 June 2022; 20:00	United States	7–0 (3–0, 2–0, 2–0)	Canada	LaBahn Arena, Madison; Attendance: 2,180

Game reference

Annelies Bergmann
Goalies
Hailey MacLeod
Mari Pietersen
Referees:
(Germany) Svenja Strohmenger
(United States) Amanda Tassoni
Linesmen:
(Finland) Johanna Oksanen
(Canada) Erin Zach

Kaiser (McCarthy, Gazdik) (PP) – 04:46	1–0
Jordan (Edwards, Janecke) – 14:02	2–0
Linsday (Kaiser, McCarthy) – 17:28	3–0
Scannell – 25:29	4–0
Gorbatenko (Morrow) – 26:43	5–0
Edwards (Simms, Morrow) (PP) – 50:22	6–0
St. Martin (Kaiser, Gazdik) (PP) – 51:09	7–0

8 min
Penalties
14 min
34
Shots
25

==== Group B ====
Pos	Team	Pld	W	OTW	OTL	L	GF	GA	GD	Pts	Qualification
1	Czechia	3	3	0	0	0	12	2	+10	9	Quarterfinals
2	Slovakia	3	1	0	0	2	7	9	−2	3 (Note: Slovakia 3 Pts, +2 GD; Switzerland 3 Pts, +1 GD; Germany 3 Pts, –3 GD)	Quarterfinals
3	Switzerland	3	1	0	0	2	3	4	−1	3	Relegation round
4	Germany	3	1	0	0	2	5	12	−7	3	Relegation round

Source: IIHF
Rules for classification: 1) points; 2) head-to-head points; 3) head-to-head goal difference; 4) head-to-head number of goals scored; 5) result against closest best-ranked team outside tied teams; 6) result against second-best ranked team outside tied teams; 7) seeding before tournament.
Notes:

6 June 2022; 16:00	Slovakia	0–4 (0–0, 0–2, 0–2)	Czechia	Bob Suter's Capitol Ice Arena, Middleton; Attendance: 233

Game reference

Laura Medviďová
Goalies
Michaela Hesová
Referees:
(United States) Jenna Janshen
(Japan) Anna Kuroda
Linesmen:
(Germany) Julia Mannlein
(Canada) Erin Zach

0–1	25:31 – Šapovalivová (Trnková, Plosová)
0–2	28:24 – Trnková (Šapovalivová, Plosová)
0–3	44:58 – Šapovalivová (Trnková)
0–4	48:40 – Hotová (Gruntová, Juříčková) (PP)

8 min
Penalties
6 min
16
Shots
41

6 June 2022; 20:00	Switzerland	0–1 (0–0, 0–0, 0–1)	Germany	Bob Suter's Capitol Ice Arena, Middleton; Attendance: 250

Game reference
Margaux Favre	Goalies	Felicity Luby	Referees: (Czech Republic) Ilona Novotná (United States) Sara Strong; Linesmen: (Finland) Johanna Oksanen (Czech Republic) Kamila Smetková
0–1 / 59:14 – Liang (Willeitner, Häckelsmiller)			Referees: (Czech Republic) Ilona Novotná (United States) Sara Strong; Linesmen: (Finland) Johanna Oksanen (Czech Republic) Kamila Smetková
4 min	Penalties	12 min	Referees: (Czech Republic) Ilona Novotná (United States) Sara Strong; Linesmen: (Finland) Johanna Oksanen (Czech Republic) Kamila Smetková
27	Shots	20	Referees: (Czech Republic) Ilona Novotná (United States) Sara Strong; Linesmen: (Finland) Johanna Oksanen (Czech Republic) Kamila Smetková

7 June 2022; 16:00	Czechia	6–2 (1–0, 2–1, 3–1)	Germany	Bob Suter's Capitol Ice Arena, Middleton; Attendance: 307

Game reference

Michaela Hesová
Barbora Dalecká
Goalies
Sara Brammen
Referees:
(Japan) Anna Kuroda
(United States) Amanda Tassoni
Linesmen:
(Germany) Julia Mannlein
(Slovakia) Eva Mária Moleková

Plosová (Šapovalivová, Pištěková) – 17:55	1–0
Gruntová (Narovcová, Veverková) – 23:37	2–0
Gruntová (Hotová) – 24:37	3–0
	3–1	26:51 – Willeitner
Pištěková (Šapovalivová, Plosová) (PP) – 41:18	4–1
Vaníčková (Mazancová, Brichová) – 42:05	5–1
Pištěková (Šapovalivová, Plosová) – 44:50	6–1
	6–2	58:16 – Voigt (Liang, Häckelsmiller)

4 min
Penalties
8 min
33
Shots
14

7 June 2022; 20:00	Switzerland	3–1 (0–0, 1–1, 2–0)	Slovakia	Bob Suter's Capitol Ice Arena, Middleton; Attendance: 336

Game reference

Margaux Favre
Goalies
Laura Medviďová
Referees:
(United States) Charlotte Hurley
(Czech Republic) Gabriela Malá
Linesmen:
(Canada) Laura Gutauskas
(Hungary) Adrienn Paulheim

	0–1	23:17 – Dobiášová (Plankenauerová, Hudáková)
Harju (Marti, Rossel) (PP) – 37:12	1–1
Gaberell (Büchi, Aymon) (PP) – 52:19	2–1
Surdez (Büchi) (SH) – 59:12	3–1

8 min
Penalties
8 min
33
Shots
18

9 June 2022; 16:00	Czechia	2–0 (0–0, 1–0, 1–0)	Switzerland	Bob Suter's Capitol Ice Arena, Middleton; Attendance: 509

Game reference
Michaela Hesová	Goalies	Margaux Favre	Referees: (United States) Charlotte Hurley (Canada) Amy Martin; Linesmen: (Canada) Laura Gutauskas (Slovakia) Eva Mária Moleková
Vaníčková (Hráčová, Malicka) – 29:41 / 1–0; Malicka (Hráčová) – 55:27 / 2–0			Referees: (United States) Charlotte Hurley (Canada) Amy Martin; Linesmen: (Canada) Laura Gutauskas (Slovakia) Eva Mária Moleková
10 min	Penalties	4 min	Referees: (United States) Charlotte Hurley (Canada) Amy Martin; Linesmen: (Canada) Laura Gutauskas (Slovakia) Eva Mária Moleková
26	Shots	21	Referees: (United States) Charlotte Hurley (Canada) Amy Martin; Linesmen: (Canada) Laura Gutauskas (Slovakia) Eva Mária Moleková

9 June 2022; 20:00	Germany	2–6 (1–2, 0–1, 1–3)	Slovakia	Bob Suter's Capitol Ice Arena, Middleton; Attendance: 213

Game reference

Felicity Luby
Sara Brammen
Goalies
Lívia Debnárová
Referees:
(Czech Republic) Ilona Novotná
(Canada) Michelle Stapleton
Linesmen:
(Switzerland) Magali Anex dit Chenaud
(Czech Republic) Kamila Smetková

Liang (Mayer, Willeitner) – 10:31	1–0
	1–1	11:55 – Fančovičová (Janeková) (PP)
	1–2	16:36 – Janeková (Fančovičová, Hudáková)
	1–3	32:39 – Kapičáková (Blichová, Halušková)
	1–4	41:46 – Tóthová (Tomaštíková)
	1–5	44:02 – Fančovičová (Plankenauerová, Hudáková)
Reichelt (Klein) – 52:28	2–5
	2–6	56:13 – Kapičáková (Blichová)

6 min
Penalties
2 min
20
Shots
30

=== Relegation round ===
The third and fourth placed team from Group B played a best-of-three series to determine the relegated team.

10 June 2022; 16:00	Switzerland	1–0 (0–0, 0–0, 1–0)	Germany	Bob Suter's Capitol Ice Arena, Middleton; Attendance: 256

Game reference
Nadia Häner	Goalies	Sara Brammen	Referees: (United States) Charlotte Hurley (United States) Amanda Tassoni; Linesmen: (United States) Sarah Buckner (Canada) Laura Gutauskas
Herzig (Bächler, Marti) (PP) – 51:27 / 1–0			Referees: (United States) Charlotte Hurley (United States) Amanda Tassoni; Linesmen: (United States) Sarah Buckner (Canada) Laura Gutauskas
4 min	Penalties	6 min	Referees: (United States) Charlotte Hurley (United States) Amanda Tassoni; Linesmen: (United States) Sarah Buckner (Canada) Laura Gutauskas
30	Shots	12	Referees: (United States) Charlotte Hurley (United States) Amanda Tassoni; Linesmen: (United States) Sarah Buckner (Canada) Laura Gutauskas

12 June 2022; 14:30	Germany	3–7 (0–3, 0–3, 3–1)	Switzerland	Bob Suter's Capitol Ice Arena, Middleton; Attendance: 305

Game reference

Chiara Schultes
Goalies
Margaux Favre
Referees:
(United States) Charlotte Hurley
(Japan) Anna Kuroda
Linesmen:
(Germany) Julia Mannlein
(Finland) Johanna Oksanen

	0–1	04:33 – Rossel (Marti, Bächler) (PP)
	0–2	13:50 – Bächler (Harju, Marti)
	0–3	19:50 – Marti (Eggli) (SH)
	0–4	23:04 – Marti (Aymon)
	0–5	25:49 – Surdez (Marti, Aymon)
	0–6	37:25 – Bargo Cuns (Surdez, Harju)
Gruß (Manns) – 45:18	1–6
	1–7	50:58 – Eggli (Bächler)
Liang (Willeitner, Häckelsmiller) – 52:16	2–7
Rose (SH) – 59:23	3–7

10 min
Penalties
14 min
18
Shots
26

=== Final round ===
Teams were reseeded for the semifinals in accordance with the following ranking:

1. tier of the group;
2. position in the group.

Rank	Team	Group	Pos
1	United States	A	1
2	Finland	A	2
3	Canada	A	3
4	Sweden	A	4
5	Czechia	B	1
6	Slovakia	B	2

==== Bracket ====
Quarterfinals
10 June
3A Canada	7
2B Slovakia	0
10 June
4A Sweden	2
1B Czechia	1

Semifinals
12 June
1 United States	3
4 Sweden	2
12 June
2 Finland	1
3 Canada	2

Final
13 June
1 United States	2
3 Canada	3
Third place
13 June
2 Finland	3
4 Sweden	0

==== Quarterfinals ====
10 June 2022; 16:00	Canada	7–0 (2–0, 2–0, 3–0)	Slovakia	LaBahn Arena, Madison; Attendance: 1,433

Game reference

Mari Pietersen
Goalies
Lívia Debnárová
Referees:
(Japan) Anna Kuroda
(Canada) Amy Martin
Linesmen:
(Germany) Julia Mannlein
(Hungary) Adrienn Paulheim

Chantler (MacEachern) – 00:52	1–0
Van Gelder (MacEachern, Iginla) – 09:31	2–0
Regalado (Van Gelder, Aubin) – 25:32	3–0
Préfontaine (Murphy, Swiderski) – 30:25	4–0
Murphy (Chantler, Préfontaine) – 41:36	5–0
Baxter (Grober) – 52:25	6–0
Pais (Hicks, Abela) – 58:37	7–0

2 min
Penalties
6 min
65
Shots
5

10 June 2022; 20:00	Sweden	2–1 (1–1, 1–0, 0–0)	Czechia	LaBahn Arena, Madison; Attendance: 1,448

Game reference

Lisa Jönsson
Goalies
Michaela Hesová
Referees:
(Germany) Svenja Strohmenger
(United States) Sara Strong
Linesmen:
(Finland) Johanna Oksanen
(Czech Republic) Kamila Smetková

	0–1	04:30 – Plosová (Šapovalivová, Pištěková) (PP)
Hall (Markström, Jungåker) – 19:05	1–1
Raunio (Markström, Jungåker) (PP2) – 24:47	2–1

14 min
Penalties
8 min
27
Shots
31

==== Semifinals ====
12 June 2022; 14:30	Finland	1–2 (0–1, 1–0, 0–1)	Canada	LaBahn Arena, Madison; Attendance: 2,006

Game reference

Emilia Kyrkkö
Goalies
Mari Pietersen
Referees:
(United States) Sara Strong
(United States) Amanda Tassoni
Linesmen:
(United States) Sarah Buckner
(Czech Republic) Kamila Smetková

	0–1	15:04 – Iginla (Aubin, Van Gelder)
Keränen (Salonen, Vanhanen) – 26:52	1–1
	1–2	50:30 – Chantler (Préfontaine)

2 min
Penalties
6 min
10
Shots
45

12 June 2022; 18:30	United States	3–2 (1–0, 0–2, 2–0)	Sweden	LaBahn Arena, Madison; Attendance: 2,051

Game reference

Annelies Bergmann
Goalies
Lisa Jönsson
Referees:
(Canada) Amy Martin
(Canada) Michelle Stapleton
Linesmen:
(Canada) Laura Gutauskas
(Canada) Erin Zach

Morrow (Gorbatenko, Hall) – 12:51	1–0
	1–1	28:04 – Lindell (Kenttälä, Kandell)
	1–2	32:27 – Jungåker (Kandell, Markström)
Scannell (Potter, Kaiser) – 41:18	2–2
Dwyer (Edwards) – 53:29	3–2

16 min
Penalties
6 min
53
Shots
24

==== Fifth place game ====
12 June 2022; 18:30	Czechia	7–2 (0–1, 6–0, 1–1)	Slovakia	Bob Suter's Capitol Ice Arena, Middleton; Attendance: 326

Game reference

Michaela Hesová
Goalies
Laura Medviďová
Referees:
(Czech Republic) Gabriela Malá
(Czech Republic) Ilona Novotná
Linesmen:
(Switzerland) Magali Anex dit Chenaud
(Slovakia) Eva Mária Moleková

	0–1	14:57 – Tóthová (Kapičáková, Mateičková) (PP)
Mazancová (Gruntová) (EA) – 22:16	1–1
Plosová (Pištěková) – 25:13	2–1
Šapovalivová (Pištěková, Plosová) – 29:27	3–1
Veverková (Matějová) – 32:06	4–1
Pištěková (Plosová, Trnková) – 36:25	5–1
Pištěková (Šapovalivová, Plosová) (PP) – 39:33	6–1
Matějová (Dubová, Veverková) – 49:38	7–1
	7–2	51:38 – Donovalová (Hudáková, Janeková) (PP)

6 min
Penalties
8 min
44
Shots
14

==== Bronze medal game ====
13 June 2022; 15:30	Finland	3–0 (0–0, 1–0, 2–0)	Sweden	LaBahn Arena, Madison; Attendance: 2,273

Game reference

Emilia Kyrkkö
Goalies
Lisa Jönsson
Referees:
(Canada) Amy Martin
(United States) Sara Strong
Linesmen:
(Canada) Laura Gutauskas
(Czech Republic) Kamila Smetková

Vanhanen (Makkonen, Keränen) (PP) – 35:04	1–0
Vanhanen (Eronen) – 46:36	2–0
Vanhanen (Salonen, Keränen) – 51:15	3–0

4 min
Penalties
8 min
24
Shots
35

==== Gold medal game ====
13 June 2022; 19:30	United States	2–3 (0–1, 2–2, 0–0)	Canada	LaBahn Arena, Madison; Attendance: 2,288

Game reference

Annelies Bergmann
Goalies
Mari Pietersen
Referees:
(Canada) Michelle Stapleton
(United States) Amanda Tassoni
Linesmen:
(United States) Sarah Buckner
(Canada) Erin Zach

	0–1	05:35 – Aubin (Chantler, Murphy) (PP)
	0–2	31:36 – Murphy (Iginla, Aubin)
	0–3	32:34 – Amos (Préfontaine, Swiderski)
McCarthy (Kaiser, Potter) (PP) – 38:23	1–3
Enright (Linsday, Burgen) – 38:30	2–3

6 min
Penalties
8 min
31
Shots
21

=== Final ranking ===
Pos	Grp	Team	Pld	W	OTW	OTL	L	GF	GA	GD	Pts	Final result
1	A	Canada	6	4	0	0	2	15	13	+2	12	Champions
2	A	United States (H)	5	4	0	0	1	23	6	+17	12	Runners-up
3	A	Finland	5	2	0	0	3	9	11	−2	6	Third place
4	A	Sweden	6	2	0	0	4	10	19	−9	6	Fourth place
5	B	Czechia	5	4	0	0	1	20	6	+14	12	Fifth place game
6	B	Slovakia	5	1	0	0	4	9	23	−14	3	Fifth place game
7	B	Switzerland	5	3	0	0	2	11	7	+4	9	Advance in Relegation
8	B	Germany	5	1	0	0	4	8	20	−12	3	Relegation to Division I A

Source: IIHF
(H) Host

=== Awards and statistics ===
==== Awards ====
Best player selected by the Directorate

Position	Player
Goaltender	(Finland) Emilia Kyrkkö
Defenceman	(Sweden) Tuva Kandell
Forward	(United States) Laila Edwards

All-Star team

Position	Player
Goaltender	(Finland) Emilia Kyrkkö
Defenceman	(United States) Sydney Morrow
Defenceman	(Canada) Sara Swiderski
Forward	(Czech Republic) Adéla Šapovalivová
Forward	(United States) Laila Edwards
Forward	(Finland) Sanni Vanhanen
MVP	(United States) Laila Edwards

==== Scoring leaders ====
List shows the top skaters sorted by points, then goals.

Rank	Player	GP	G	A	Pts	+/−	PIM	POS
1	(Czech Republic) Tereza Plosová	5	3	7	10	+8	0	F
2	(Czech Republic) Adéla Šapovalivová	5	3	6	9	+10	2	F
3	(United States) Laila Edwards	5	4	4	8	+4	2	F
3	(Czech Republic) Tereza Pištěková	5	4	4	8	+9	0	F
5	(United States) Sydney Morrow	5	1	7	8	+7	4	D
6	(Switzerland) Alina Marti	5	2	5	7	0	4	F
7	(United States) Tessa Janecke	5	3	3	6	+3	2	F
7	(Finland) Sanni Vanhanen	5	3	3	6	+3	2	F
9	(Sweden) Tuva Kandell	6	1	5	6	–4	6	D
10	(Canada) Ava Murphy	6	2	3	6	+1	4	D

GP = Games played; G = Goals; A = Assists; Pts = Points; +/− = Plus/minus; PIM = Penalties in minutes; POS = Position
Source: IIHF

==== Leading goaltenders ====
Only the top five goaltenders, based on save percentage, who have played at least 40% of their team's minutes, are included in this list.

Rank	Player	TOI	GA	GAA	SA	Sv%	SO
1	(Finland) Emilia Kyrkkö	238:44	6	1.51	145	95.86	2
2	(Czech Republic) Michaela Hesová	286:34	5	1.05	89	94.38	2
3	(Canada) Mari Pietersen	273:17	6	1.32	96	93.75	1
4	(United States) Annelies Bergmann	238:29	6	1.51	91	93.41	1
5	(Sweden) Lisa Jönsson	292:03	13	2.67	191	93.19	0

TOI = Time on ice (minutes:seconds); SA = Shots against; GA = Goals against; GAA = Goals against average; Sv% = Save percentage; SO = Shutouts
Source: IIHF

== Division I ==
=== Group A ===
The tournament would have been held in Győr, Hungary from 9 to 15 January 2022. It was rescheduled and played from 3 to 8 April 2022.

Pos	Team	Pld	W	OTW	OTL	L	GF	GA	GD	Pts	Promotion or relegation
1	Japan	4	4	0	0	0	26	0	+26	12	Promoted to the 2023 Top Division
2	France	4	2	1	0	1	9	9	0	8	
3	Italy	4	0	2	1	1	7	9	−2	5	
4	Hungary (H)	4	1	0	1	2	10	13	−3	4	
5	Norway	4	0	0	1	3	5	26	−21	1	

Source: IIHF
(H) Host

=== Group B ===
The tournament would have been held in Radenthein, Austria from 10 to 16 January 2022. It was rescheduled to 6–11 September.

Pos	Team	Pld	W	OTW	OTL	L	GF	GA	GD	Pts	Promotion or relegation
1	Austria (H)	4	3	0	1	0	18	5	+13	10	Promoted to the 2023 Division I A
2	Poland	4	2	0	1	1	5	8	−3	7	
3	Chinese Taipei	4	1	1	0	2	7	16	−9	5 (Note: Chinese Taipei 4–1 South Korea)	
4	South Korea	4	1	1	0	2	8	9	−1	5	
5	Denmark	4	1	0	0	3	7	7	0	3	
6	China	0	0	0	0	0	0	0	0	0	Withdrew

Source: IIHF
(H) Host

== Division II ==
The tournament would have been held in Istanbul, Turkey from 21 to 27 January 2022. It was rescheduled and played from 27 June to 5 July.

Gold medal	Spain
Silver medal	Great Britain
Bronze medal	Australia
4	Netherlands
5	Latvia
6	Turkey
7	Mexico
8	Kazakhstan
9	Iceland

Promoted to the 2023 Division I B	Relegated to the 2023 Division II B
