= Svenja Voigt =

German ice hockey player (born 2004)

- Born: 29 March 2004 (age 22) Cologne, Germany
- Height: 165 cm (5 ft 5 in)
- Position: Forward
- Shoots: Left
- NCAA team Former teams: St. Cloud State Huskies; Stanstead Spartans
- National team: Germany
- Playing career: 2020–present

Svenja Voigt (born 29 March 2004) is a German ice hockey player and member of the German national team, currently playing in the NCAA Division I with the St. Cloud State Huskies women's ice hockey program.

She represented Germany at the IIHF Women's World Championship in 2021 and 2023.

== Playing career ==
Voigt started playing ice hockey at age 7 with the youth department of the Kölner Eishockey-Club (KEC) in her home city of Cologne (Köln), Germany. She played with KEC teams throughout her childhood and made a one-game appearance with the secondary team of the Kölner EC Frauen in the Frauen 2. Liga Nord during the 2017–18 season. In addition to playing at elite club level, Voigt was also chosen to the Germany Selects under-14 teams for the World Selects Invitational U14 tournaments in 2016 and 2017, and the Germany Selects U18 team for the World Selects Invitational U18 tournament in 2019.

In the fall of 2019, Voigt began attending Stanstead College, an independent day and boarding school in Stanstead, Quebec, Canada, known for its varsity ice hockey program. She immediately began playing with the Stanstead Spartans girls' varsity ice hockey program in the North American Prep Hockey Association (NAPHA). In her first season at Stanstead College, the team won the NAPHA championship.

Due to the COVID-19 pandemic, the Stanstead College ice hockey teams did not to participate in the 2020–21 season. Voigt played the 2021–22 season with the Spartans in the NAPHA and Junior Women's Hockey League (JWHL).

== International play ==
Voigt made her IIHF U18 Women's World Championship debut with the German national under-18 team at the Division I Group A tournament of the 2020 IIHF U18 Women's World Championship in Landshut, Germany. She contributed a goal and an assist in three games played as Germany claimed their first gold medal at the Division I Group A level and gained promotion to the Top Division. A week later, she joined the German U16 team in the girls' ice hockey tournament at the 2020 Winter Youth Olympics in Lausanne, Switzerland. She led the team in scoring, netting two of Germany's three goals in the tournament – the third goal was scored by Katharina Häckelsmiller.

Following the March 2020 to July 2021 period during which women's international ice hockey play was halted due to the COVID-19 pandemic, Voigt made her debut with the German senior national team at the 2021 IIHF Women's World Championship in Calgary, Canada. She did not record a point in the tournament as Germany finished in eighth place.

=== Statistics ===
Year	Team	Event	Result	GP	G	A	Pts	PIM
2020	Germany U18	WW18 D1A	1st	3	1	1	2	25
2020	Germany U16	YOG	6th	2	2	0	2	4
2021	Germany	WW	8th	6	0	0	0	2
2022	Germany U18	WW18	8th	5	1	0	1	6
2023	Germany	WW	8th	6	1	0	1	4
2024	Germany	WW	6th	6	0	1	1	2
2025	Germany	OGQ	Q	3	1	2	3	2
2025	Germany	WW	8th	5	0	2	2	2
2026	Germany	OG	7th	5	0	0	0	0
Junior totals				8	2	1	3	31
Senior totals				31	2	5	7	12

|}
