= Mira Markström =

Swedish ice hockey player (born 2005)

- Born: 30 January 2005 (age 21) Jönköping, Sweden
- Height: 176 cm (5 ft 9 in)
- Weight: 67 kg (148 lb; 10 st 8 lb)
- Position: Defense
- Shoots: Left
- SDHL team: HV71
- Played for: IF Troja-Ljungby
- National team: Sweden
- Playing career: 2019–present
Medal record
Women's floorball
Representing Sweden
World Games
Silver medal – second place	2025 Chengdu	Team

Mira Markström (born 30 January 2005) is a Swedish ice hockey defenceman and member of the Swedish national under-18 ice hockey team, currently playing on a junior contract with HV71 Dam of the Swedish Women's Hockey League (SDHL). She also plays floorball with Jönköpings IK.

On 21 April 2023, Mira Markström announced her retirement from ice hockey while continuing to play floorball.

== Playing career ==
Markström began playing ice hockey at the age of four, and played on boys' teams in her home town of Jönköping until she was 15. She made her SDHL debut with HV71 in the 2019–20 season, picking up three assists in 20 games. She added another assist in six playoff games as the club made it to the championship finals against Luleå HF/MSSK before the season was cancelled due to the COVID-19 pandemic in Sweden. In 2019, she scored the first goal in the first-ever girls TV-pucken tournament.

It only took her 11 games to surpass her rookie production in her second season, having scored 4 points in the first 11 games of the 2020–21 SDHL season, including her first professional goal.

=== International play ===
As an ice hockey player, she represented Sweden at the 2020 IIHF World Women's U18 Championship, picking up one assist in five games as Sweden finished fifth. She also represented Sweden at the 2022 IIHF World Women's U18 Championship.

As a floorball player, she represented Team Sweden U19 during a Euro Floorball Tour competition in Uppsala in late October 2022.
