= Sydney Morrow =

American ice hockey player (born 2004)

- Born: April 12, 2004 (age 22) Stamford, Connecticut, U.S.
- Height: 5 ft 7 in (170 cm)
- Weight: 165 lb (75 kg; 11 st 11 lb)
- Position: Defense
- Shoots: Right
- NCAA team: University of Minnesota
- National team: United States
- Playing career: 2022–present
Medal record
World Championship
Silver medal – second place	2024 United States
World U18 Championship
Silver medal – second place	2022 United States

Sydney Morrow (born April 12, 2004) is an American ice hockey defenceman for the Seattle Torrent. She played collegiately at Minnesota, as well as for Ohio State and Colgate.

== Early life ==
Morrow attended Shattuck-Saint Mary's in Faribault, Minnesota, where she played ice hockey for five seasons. During the 2020–21 season, in her junior year, she recorded 31 goals and 47 assists, setting a school record for the most points scored by a defenseman in a year with 78 points. During the 2021–22 season, in her senior year, she set a new school record for the most points scored by a defenseman in a year with 89 points, surpassing the previous record she set the year prior.

== Playing career ==
Morrow began her collegiate career for Ohio State during the 2022–23 season. During her freshman year she recorded three goals and five assists in 33 games.

On August 2, 2023, Morrow transferred to Colgate. During the 2023–24 season, in her sophomore year, she recorded 13 goals and 26 assists in 34 games. Her 39 points tied for the national lead in points by a defenseman. On November 10, 2023, in a game against Dartmouth, she recorded her first career hat-trick, and finished with a career-high five-points. She was subsequently named the ECAC Defender of the Month for the month ending December 2023. Following the season she was named to the All-ECAC second team, All-USCHO third team, and CCM/AHCA second team All-American.

On July 19, 2024, she transferred to Minnesota. During the 2024–25 season, in her junior year, she recorded 11 goals and 19 assists in 42 games and was named to the All-WCHA second team.

On June 17, 2026, Sydney was drafted by the Seattle Torrent of the Professional Women's Hockey League in the second round, 14th overall.

== International play ==
Morrow represented the United States at the 2022 IIHF World Women's U18 Championship where she recorded one goal and seven assists in five games and won a silver medal. She led all defensemen in scoring with eight points and was subsequently named to the All-Tournament team.

On March 31, 2024, she was named to the United States roster for the 2024 IIHF Women's World Championship. She served as an alternate during the tournament and won a silver medal.

== Personal life ==
Morrow was born to Steve and Karen Morrow, and has a sister, Sophie, and two brothers, Scott and Spencer. Her brother, Scott, is a professional ice hockey for the New York Rangers of the National Hockey League (NHL). She is the niece of retired professional ice hockey player Scott Morrow.

== Career statistics ==
=== Regular season and playoffs ===
			Regular season					Playoffs
Season	Team	League	GP	G	A	Pts	PIM	GP	G	A	Pts	PIM
2022–23	Ohio State University	WCHA	33	3	5	8	2	—	—	—	—	—
2023–24	Colgate University	ECAC	34	13	26	39	4	—	—	—	—	—
2024–25	University of Minnesota	WCHA	42	11	19	30	18	—	—	—	—	—
2025–26	University of Minnesota	WCHA	39	8	30	38	18	—	—	—	—	—
NCAA totals			148	35	80	115	42	—	—	—	—	—

=== International ===
Year	Team	Event	Result	GP	G	A	Pts	PIM
2022	United States	U18	2nd place, silver medalist(s)	5	1	7	8	4
Junior totals				5	1	7	8	4
