= Jade Iginla =

Canadian ice hockey player (born 2004)

- Born: October 19, 2004 (age 22) Kelowna, British Columbia, Canada
- Height: 5 ft 8 in (173 cm)
- Position: Right wing
- Shoots: Right
- PWHL team Former teams: Hamilton Havoc; Brown University

Jade Grace Iginla (born October 19, 2004) is a Canadian Professional ice hockey player who is a right wing for the Hamilton Havoc of the Professional Women's Hockey League (PWHL). Previously, she played for Brown University of the National Collegiate Athletic Association (NCAA).

== Playing career ==
For her junior year of high school, Iginla attended Shattuck-Saint Mary's, recording 15 goals and 30 points in 39 games. The following year, her family moved to Kelowna, where she joined RINK Hockey Academy. With RINK, she would post 18 goals and 28 points in 22 games.

Iginla joined Brown University for the 2022–23 season, where she was immediately an impact player. She recorded her first collegiate hat-trick on February 3, 2023, against Rensselaer Polytechnic Institute. Finishing the year with 23 points, her 17 goals were tied for seventh in her conference and were the most by a Bear since 2007, as well as the most among ECAC freshmen and third among rookies nationally. She was named the team's most valuable player and ECAC Co-Rookie of the Year.

As a sophomore in the 2023–24 season, Iginla scored 16 goals and 27 points, including a hat-trick against Harvard University on February 9, 2024. Her 11 assists ranked second among Brown players, and her 99 shots led the team. For her efforts, she would be named Second Team All-Ivy League.

On June 17, 2026, Iginla was drafted by the Hamilton Havoc in the second round of the 2026 PWHL draft as the 18th overall draft pick.

== International play ==
Medal record

Representing Canada

Women's ice hockey

World U18 Championship
Gold medal – first place	2022 United States	

At the 2022 World U18 Championship, Iginla sustained an upper-body injury in pre-tournament play, and was not initially expected to return in time to make her Team Canada debut at the event. Returning after the preliminary round, she scored one goal and two assists in three games, including an assist in the 3–2 gold medal game victory over the United States.

== Personal life ==
Jade Grace Iginla was born on October 19, 2004. She is the eldest child of Hockey Hall of Fame inductee Jarome Iginla. Her younger brothers Joe and Tij both play major junior hockey in the Western Hockey League. She grew up playing ringette, softball, and figure skating. She first transitioned to hockey after watching Tij play, and eventually began to pursue it full time while recovering from a long-term elbow injury as a high school freshman.

Iginla is of Yoruba descent through her father; their surname means "big tree" in the Yoruba language.

== Career statistics ==
=== College ===
			Regular season					Playoffs
Season	Team	League	GP	G	A	Pts	PIM	GP	G	A	Pts	PIM
2022–23	Brown University	ECAC	29	17	6	23	4	—	—	—	—	—
2023–24	Brown University	ECAC	32	16	11	27	12	—	—	—	—	—
2024–25	Brown University	ECAC	30	6	10	16	16	—	—	—	—	—
NCAA totals			91	39	27	66	32	—	—	—	—	—

=== International ===
Year	Team	Event	Result	GP	G	A	Pts	PIM
2022	Canada	U18	1st place, gold medalist(s)	3	1	2	3	2
Junior totals				3	1	2	3	2

== Awards and honours ==
Award	Year	Ref
College
ECAC All-Rookie Team	2023	
ECAC Rookie of the Year	2023	
Second Team All-Ivy	2024	
Brown University
Women's Hockey Most Valuable Player	2023	
