= Katharina Häckelsmiller =

German ice hockey player (born 2004)

- Born: 27 August 2004 (age 22) Bobingen, Germany
- Height: 163 cm (5 ft 4 in)
- Weight: 56 kg (123 lb; 8 st 11 lb)
- Position: Forward
- Shoots: Left
- DFEL team: ERC Ingolstadt
- National team: Germany
- Playing career: 2020–present

Katharina "Kathi" Häckelsmiller (born 27 August 2004) is a German ice hockey player and member of the German national ice hockey team, currently playing in the German Women's Ice Hockey League (DFEL) with ERC Ingolstadt.

== International career ==
Häckelsmiller represented Germany in the girls' ice hockey tournament at the 2020 Winter Youth Olympics in Lausanne, Switzerland. She scored one of Germany's three goals in the tournament – the other two goals were tallied by Svenja Voigt.

The 2021 IIHF Women's World Championship in Calgary, Canada served as her debut with the German senior national team. She was the youngest player on the team and played in three of the Germany's six games, not recording any points.

In an upset of the traditional order, Häckelsmiller's German national under-18 team debut came after her first appearance with the senior national team and was made at the 2022 IIHF U18 Women's World Championship in Madison, Wisconsin, United States. She tallied three assists in the tournament, ranking third in scoring for the German team.

=== Statistics ===
| Year | Team | Event | Result | GP | G | A | Pts | PIM |
|---|---|---|---|---|---|---|---|---|
| 2020 | Germany U16 | YOG | 6th | 2 | 1 | 0 | 1 | 0 |
| 2021 | Germany | WW | 8th | 3 | 0 | 0 | 0 | 0 |
| 2022 | Germany U18 | WW18 | 8th | 5 | 0 | 3 | 3 | 0 |
| 2025 | Germany | OGQ | Q | 2 | 0 | 0 | 0 | 0 |
| 2026 | Germany | OG | 7th | 3 | 0 | 0 | 0 | 0 |
| Junior totals | | | | 5 | 0 | 3 | 3 | 0 |
| Senior totals | | | | 8 | 0 | 0 | 0 | 0 |
