= Scott Morrow (ice hockey, born 2002) =

American ice hockey player (born 2002)

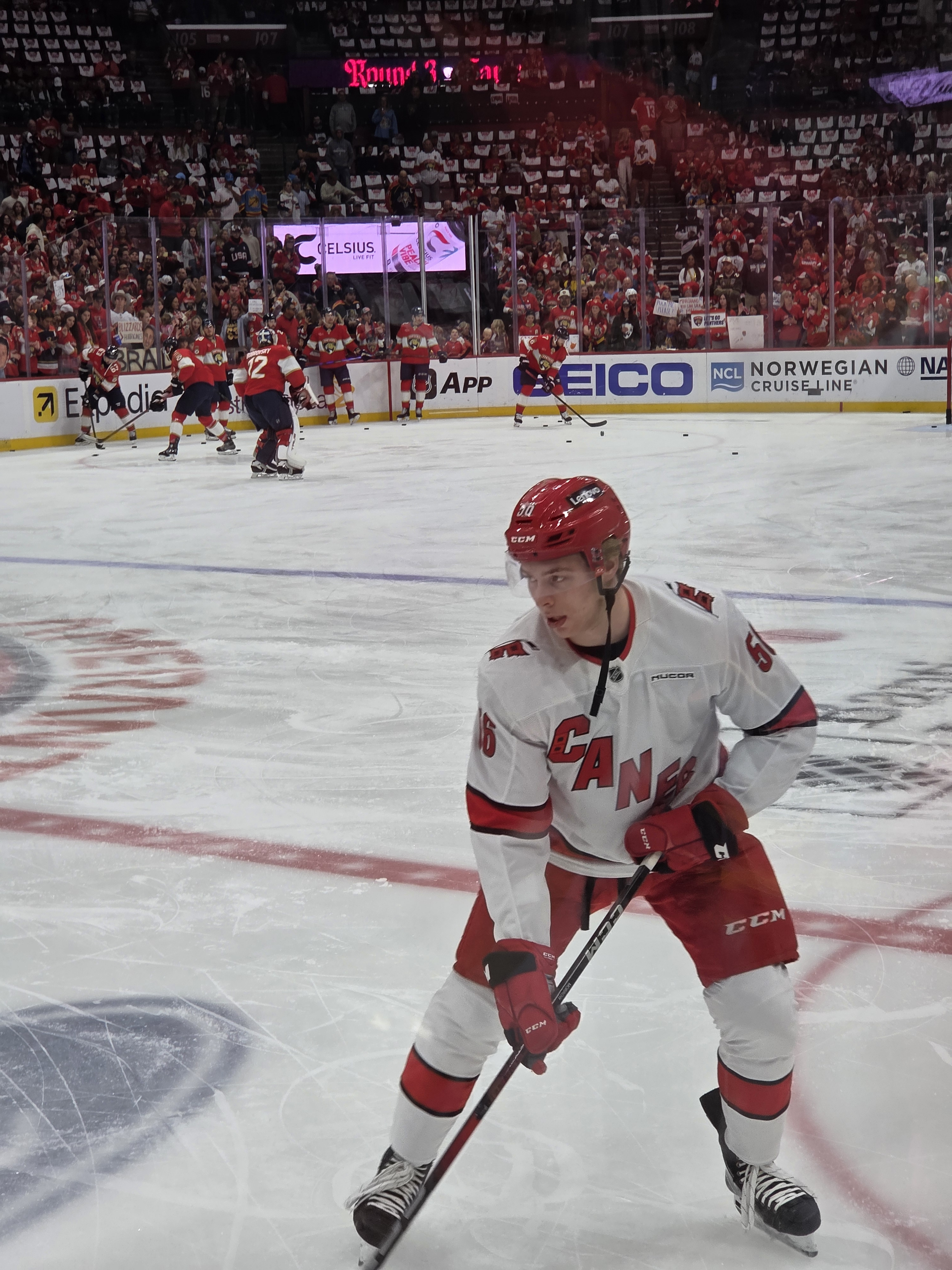
- Morrow with Carolina Hurricanes in 2025
- Born: November 1, 2002 (age 23) Stamford, Connecticut, U.S.
- Height: 6 ft 2 in (188 cm)
- Weight: 194 lb (88 kg; 13 st 12 lb)
- Position: Defense
- Shoots: Right
- NHL team (P) Cur. team Former teams: New York Rangers; Hartford Wolf Pack (AHL); Carolina Hurricanes
- NHL draft: 40th overall, 2021; Carolina Hurricanes
- Playing career: 2024–present

Scott Dempsey Morrow (born November 1, 2002) is an American professional ice hockey defenseman for the Hartford Wolf Pack of the American Hockey League (AHL) as a prospect of the New York Rangers of the National Hockey League (NHL). He was drafted in the second round, 40th overall, by the Carolina Hurricanes in the 2021 NHL entry draft. He played college ice hockey at UMass.

== Playing career ==
=== Collegiate ===
Morrow began his collegiate career for Massachusetts during the 2021–22 season. During his freshman year, he recorded 13 goals and 20 assists in 37 games. He was the first freshman in UMass program history to reach 30 points in a season. In January 2022, he recorded four goals and five assists in eight games. His nine points ranked second among rookie defensemen during the month, and he was subsequently named the Hockey East Rookie of the Month. He ranked second among rookie defensemen in goals (13) and points (33), third in points-per-game (.892), and fifth in assists (20). Among all defensemen nationally, he ranked eighth in points per game, tied for fourth in goals, and fifth in points. Following an outstanding season he was a unanimous selection to the All-Hockey East Rookie Team and All-Hockey East All-Hockey East First Team. He was also named an AHCA East First Team All-American.

=== Professional ===
==== Carolina Hurricanes (2024–2025) ====
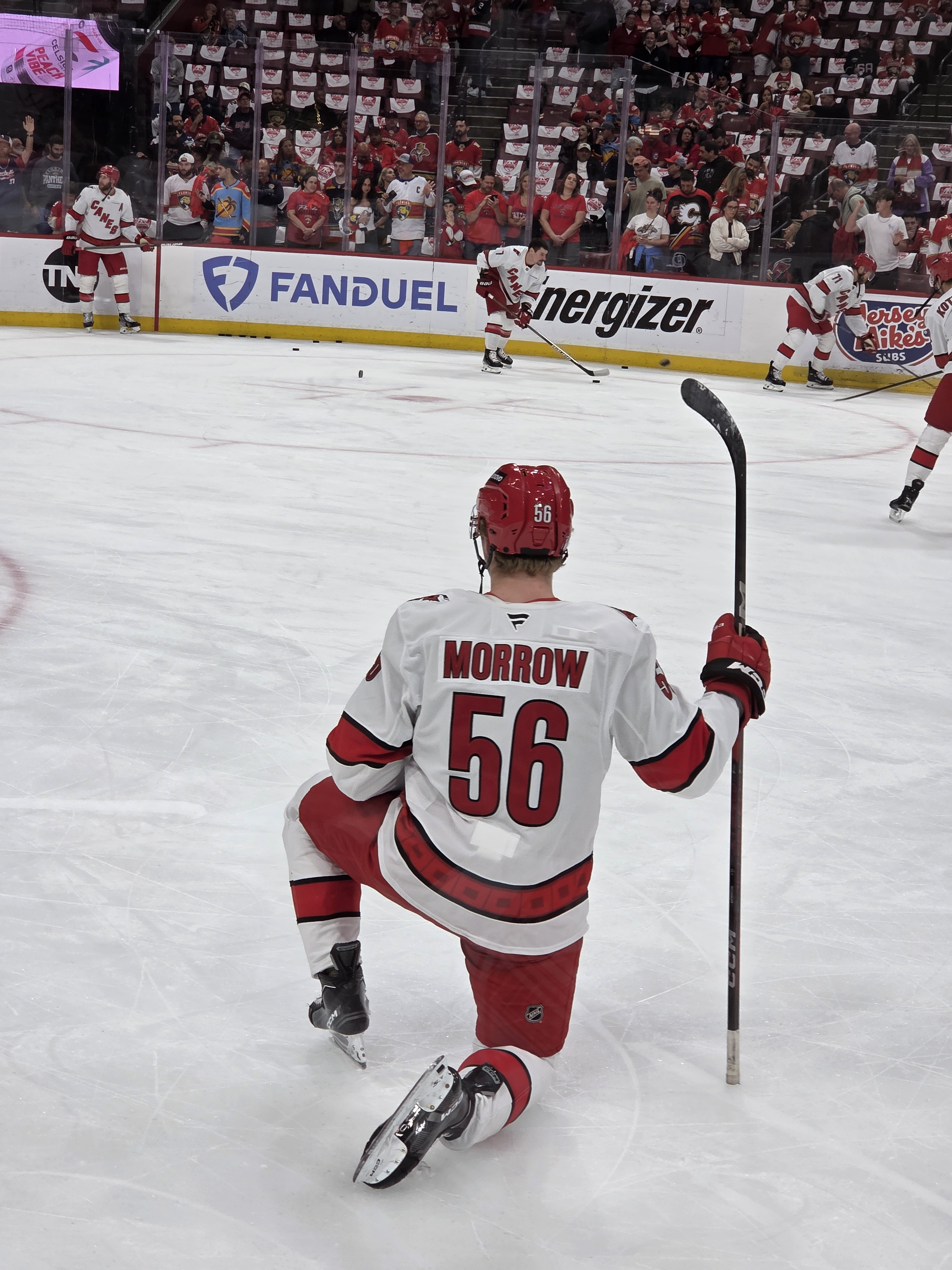
Scott Morrow in the Eastern Conference Finals of the Stanley Cup Playoffs in 2025

On April 2, 2024 Morrow signed a three-year, entry-level contract with the Carolina Hurricanes. Morrow made his NHL debut for the Hurricanes on April 12, 2024 against the St. Louis Blues.

On May 20, 2025, with Carolina Hurricanes defensemen Jalen Chatfield out for Eastern Conference Finals Game 1 against Florida Panthers, Morrow was added to the Carolina Hurricanes active roster. Morrow made his playoff debut and spent 12 minutes and 18 seconds on ice.

==== New York Rangers (2025–present) ====
On July 1, 2025, the Hurricanes traded Morrow, a conditional 2026 first-round pick, and a 2026 second-round pick to the New York Rangers in exchange for K'Andre Miller. Prior to the 2025-26 season, Hockey News writer Stan Fischler rated Morrow as the Rangers' 3rd best prospect, as did Vincent Z. Mercogliano of The Athletic. The Rangers assigned him to the Hartford Wolf Pack as one of the last cuts in training camp before the start of the 2025–26 season.

== International play ==
On December 14, 2021, Morrow was named to the Team USA's roster for the 2022 World Junior Ice Hockey Championships.

== Personal life ==
Morrow was born to Steve and Karen Morrow, and has a brother, Spencer, and two sisters, Sydney and Sophie. His sister, Sydney, is an ice hockey player for the Seattle Torrent. He is the nephew of retired professional ice hockey player Scott Morrow.

== Career statistics ==
| | | | Regular season | | | | | Playoffs |
| Season | Team | League | GP | G | A | Pts | PIM | GP | G | A | Pts | PIM |
|---|---|---|---|---|---|---|---|---|---|---|---|---|
| 2019–20 | Youngstown Phantoms | USHL | 2 | 0 | 1 | 1 | 0 | — | — | — | — | — |
| 2020–21 | Fargo Force | USHL | — | — | — | — | — | 6 | 0 | 0 | 0 | 0 |
| 2021–22 | UMass-Amherst | HE | 37 | 13 | 20 | 33 | 10 | — | — | — | — | — |
| 2022–23 | UMass-Amherst | HE | 35 | 9 | 22 | 31 | 16 | — | — | — | — | — |
| 2023–24 | UMass-Amherst | HE | 37 | 6 | 24 | 30 | 25 | — | — | — | — | — |
| 2023–24 | Carolina Hurricanes | NHL | 2 | 0 | 0 | 0 | 0 | — | — | — | — | — |
| 2024–25 | Chicago Wolves | AHL | 52 | 13 | 26 | 39 | 47 | 2 | 0 | 0 | 0 | 2 |
| 2024–25 | Carolina Hurricanes | NHL | 14 | 1 | 5 | 6 | 0 | 5 | 0 | 0 | 0 | 2 |
| 2025–26 | Hartford Wolf Pack | AHL | 34 | 5 | 14 | 19 | 69 | — | — | — | — | — |
| 2025–26 | New York Rangers | NHL | 29 | 0 | 6 | 6 | 4 | — | — | — | — | — |
| NHL totals | | | 45 | 1 | 11 | 12 | 4 | 5 | 0 | 0 | 0 | 2 |

== Awards and honors ==
| Award | Year |
College
| All-Hockey East First Team | 2021–22 |
| All-Hockey East Rookie Team | 2021–22 |
| All-Hockey East Second Team | 2022–23 |
| All-Hockey East Third Team | 2023–24 |
| AHCA East First Team All-American | 2021–22 |
