= Scott Morrow (ice hockey, born 1969) =

American ice hockey player (born 1969)

- Born: June 18, 1969 (age 56) Chicago, Illinois, U.S.
- Height: 6 ft 1 in (185 cm)
- Weight: 185 lb (84 kg; 13 st 3 lb)
- Position: Left wing
- Shot: Left
- Played for: Calgary Flames
- NHL draft: 95th overall, 1988; Hartford Whalers
- Playing career: 1992–2002

Scott Morrow (born June 18, 1969) is an American former professional ice hockey player.

== Career ==
Morrow played college ice hockey at New Hampshire for four years before turning pro, where he was named a Second Team All-Star by Hockey East in 1992. He played four games in the National Hockey League for the Calgary Flames during the 1994–95 season. The rest of his career, which lasted from 1992 to 2002, was spent in the minor leagues. Morrow was drafted by the Hartford Whalers in the fifth round, 95th overall, of the 1988 NHL entry draft.

== Personal life ==
Morrow has been married to Rebecca Morrow since 2012. They have four children.

Morrow's nephew, Scott, is a professional ice hockey player for the New York Rangers of the NHL, while his niece, Sydney, is a college ice hockey player for Minnesota.

== Career statistics ==
=== Regular season and playoffs ===
			Regular season					Playoffs
Season	Team	League	GP	G	A	Pts	PIM	GP	G	A	Pts	PIM
1987–88	Northwood School	HS-NY	24	10	18	28	30	—	—	—	—	—
1988–89	University of New Hampshire	HE	19	6	7	13	14	—	—	—	—	—
1989–90	University of New Hampshire	HE	29	10	11	21	35	—	—	—	—	—
1990–91	University of New Hampshire	HE	31	11	11	22	52	—	—	—	—	—
1991–92	University of New Hampshire	HE	35	29	23	52	63	—	—	—	—	—
1991–92	Springfield Indians	AHL	2	0	1	1	0	5	0	0	0	9
1992–93	Springfield Indians	AHL	70	22	29	51	80	15	6	9	15	21
1993–94	Springfield Indians	AHL	30	12	15	27	28	—	—	—	—	—
1993–94	Saint John Flames	AHL	8	2	2	4	0	7	2	1	3	10
1994–95	Calgary Flames	NHL	4	0	0	0	0	—	—	—	—	—
1994–95	Saint John Flames	AHL	64	18	21	39	105	5	2	0	2	4
1995–96	Hershey Bears	AHL	79	48	45	93	114	5	2	2	4	6
1996–97	Cincinnati Cyclones	IHL	67	14	23	37	50	—	—	—	—	—
1996–97	Providence Bruins	AHL	11	3	4	7	15	7	2	1	3	0
1997–98	B.C. Icemen	UHL	8	3	2	5	14	—	—	—	—	—
1997–98	Cincinnati Cyclones	IHL	55	15	12	27	44	9	3	1	4	23
1997–98	Providence Bruins	AHL	5	1	4	5	7	—	—	—	—	—
1998–99	Cincinnati Cyclones	IHL	80	29	22	51	116	3	0	2	2	2
2000–01	Augusta Lynx	ECHL	70	33	53	86	143	3	1	3	4	2
2000–01	Manitoba Moose	IHL	8	1	2	3	6	2	0	0	0	0
2001–02	Augusta Lynx	ECHL	71	28	46	74	130	—	—	—	—	—
AHL totals			269	106	121	227	349	44	14	13	27	50
NHL totals			4	0	0	0	0	—	—	—	—	—

== Awards and honors ==
Award	Year
All-Hockey East Second team	1991–92
