= Ebba Svensson Träff =

Swedish ice hockey player (born 2004)

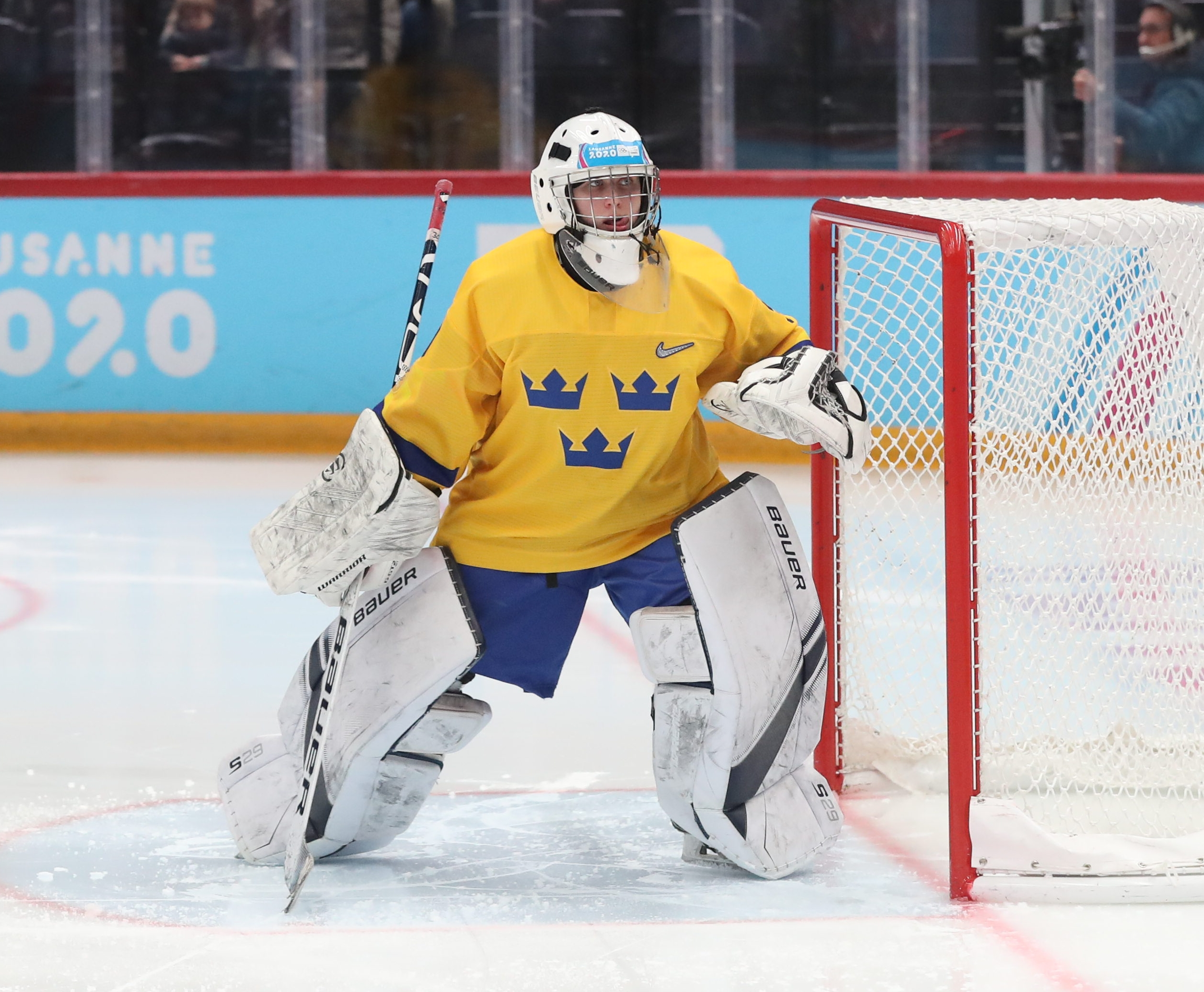
- Svensson Träff at the 2020 Winter Youth Olympics
- Born: 27 November 2004 (age 21) Oskarshamn, Sweden
- Height: 166 cm (5 ft 5 in)
- Weight: 67 kg (148 lb; 10 st 8 lb)
- Position: Goaltender
- Catches: Left
- SDHL team: Linköping HC
- National team: Sweden
- Playing career: 2020–present
Medal record
World Championship
Bronze medal – third place	2026 Denmark

Ebba Svensson Träff (born 27 November 2004) is a Swedish ice hockey goaltender for Linköping HC of the Swedish Women's Hockey League (SDHL) and a member of Sweden women's national ice hockey team.

== Playing career ==
Svensson Träff began her career with Linköping HC of the SDHL during the 2020–21 season. On 5 January 2024, she signed a three-year contract extension with Linköping.

== International play ==
Svensson Träff represented Sweden at the 2020 IIHF U18 Women's World Championship. She then represented Sweden at the 2020 Winter Youth Olympics where she posted a 2–1–0 record, with a 1.67 GAA and .907 save percentage and won a silver medal. She again competed at the 2022 IIHF U18 Women's World Championship.

On 25 March 2025, she was named to Sweden's senior national team for the 2025 IIHF Women's World Championship. On 12 January 2026, she was named to Sweden's roster to compete at the 2026 Winter Olympics.

On 5 February 2026, Traff gained the start in Sweden's first game at the Olympics, recording 15 saves, defeating Germany in a 4-1 final. In Group B Preliminary Round, Traff recorded a 3-0 mark. Of note, she logged her first Olympic shutout on 10 February in a 4-0 win versus Japan, preventing them from reaching the quarterfinal round.

In the quarterfinals of the 2026 Olympics, Träff made 28 saves for the shutout as Sweden eliminated Czechia in a 2-0 win.
