= Ida Karlsson =

Swedish ice hockey player (born 2004)

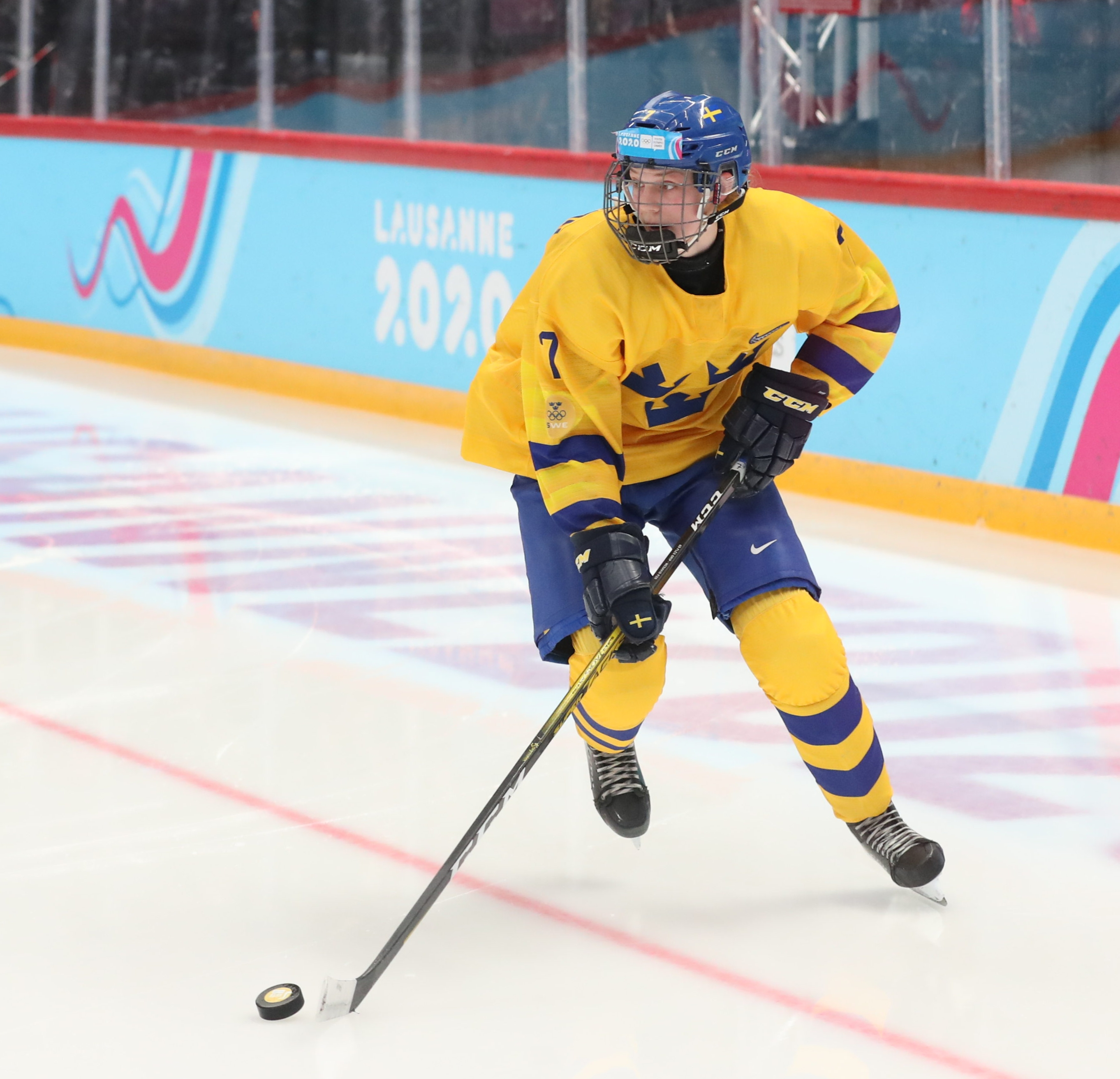
- Karlsson at the 2020 Winter Youth Olympics
- Born: 30 June 2004 (age 22) Avesta, Sweden
- Height: 178 cm (5 ft 10 in)
- Weight: 72 kg (159 lb; 11 st 5 lb)
- Position: Defence
- Shoots: Right
- WCHA team Former teams: Minnesota Duluth; Leksands IF
- National team: Sweden
- Playing career: 2019–present
Medal record
World Championship
Bronze medal – third place	2026 Denmark

Ida Karlsson (born 30 June 2004) is a Swedish college ice hockey defenceman for Minnesota Duluth of the National Collegiate Athletic Association (NCAA) and is a member of Sweden women's national ice hockey team. She previously played for Leksands IF of the Swedish Women's Hockey League (SDHL).

== Early life ==
Karlsson was born to Fredrik Karlsson and Malin Andersson, and has one sister, Alva.

== Playing career ==
Karlsson began her career with Leksands IF of the SDHL and made her debut during the 2019–20 season.

She began her collegiate career at Minnesota Duluth during the 2023–24 season. During her freshman year, she recorded one goal and 12 assists in 39 games. During the 2024–25 season, in her sophomore year, she recorded three goals and four assists in 36 games.

== International play ==
Johansson represented Sweden at the 2020 IIHF U18 Women's World Championship where she recorded one assist in five games. She then represented Sweden at the 2020 Winter Youth Olympics where she recorded two assists in four games and won a silver medal. She again competed at the 2022 IIHF U18 Women's World Championship where she recorded one goal and one assist in six games.

She made her senior national team debut for Sweden during 2024 IIHF Women's World Championship where she recorded two assists in five games She again competed at the 2025 IIHF Women's World Championship where she recorded two assists in six games.

On 12 January 2026, she was named to Sweden's roster to compete at the 2026 Winter Olympics.

On 20 October 2026, she was selected to represent Sweden at the 2026 IIHF Women's World Championship. She recorded two goals and one assist in seven games to help Sweden win their first IIHF Women's World Championship medal since 2007.

== Career statistics ==
=== Regular season and playoffs ===
			Regular season					Playoffs
Season	Team	League	GP	G	A	Pts	PIM	GP	G	A	Pts	PIM
2019–20	Leksands IF	SDHL	10	1	1	2	0	2	0	0	0	0
2020–21	Leksands IF	SDHL	36	2	4	6	26	—	—	—	—	—
2021–22	Leksands IF	SDHL	35	0	1	1	26	2	1	0	1	0
2022–23	Leksands IF	SDHL	26	5	2	7	35	3	1	1	2	2
2023–24	University of Minnesota Duluth	WCHA	39	1	12	13	18	—	—	—	—	—
2024–25	University of Minnesota Duluth	WCHA	36	3	4	7	26	—	—	—	—	—
SDHL totals			107	8	8	16	87	7	2	1	3	2

=== International ===
Year	Team	Event	Result	GP	G	A	Pts	PIM
2020	Sweden	U18	5th	5	0	1	1	6
2022	Sweden	U18	4th	6	1	1	2	12
2024	Sweden	WC	7th	5	0	2	2	6
2025	Sweden	WC	6th	6	0	2	2	4
2026	Sweden	OG	4th	7	0	1	1	4
2026	Sweden	WC	3rd place, bronze medalist(s)	7	2	1	3	2
Junior totals				11	1	2	3	18
Senior totals				25	2	6	8	16
