= Nicole Hall =

Swedish ice hockey player (born 2004)

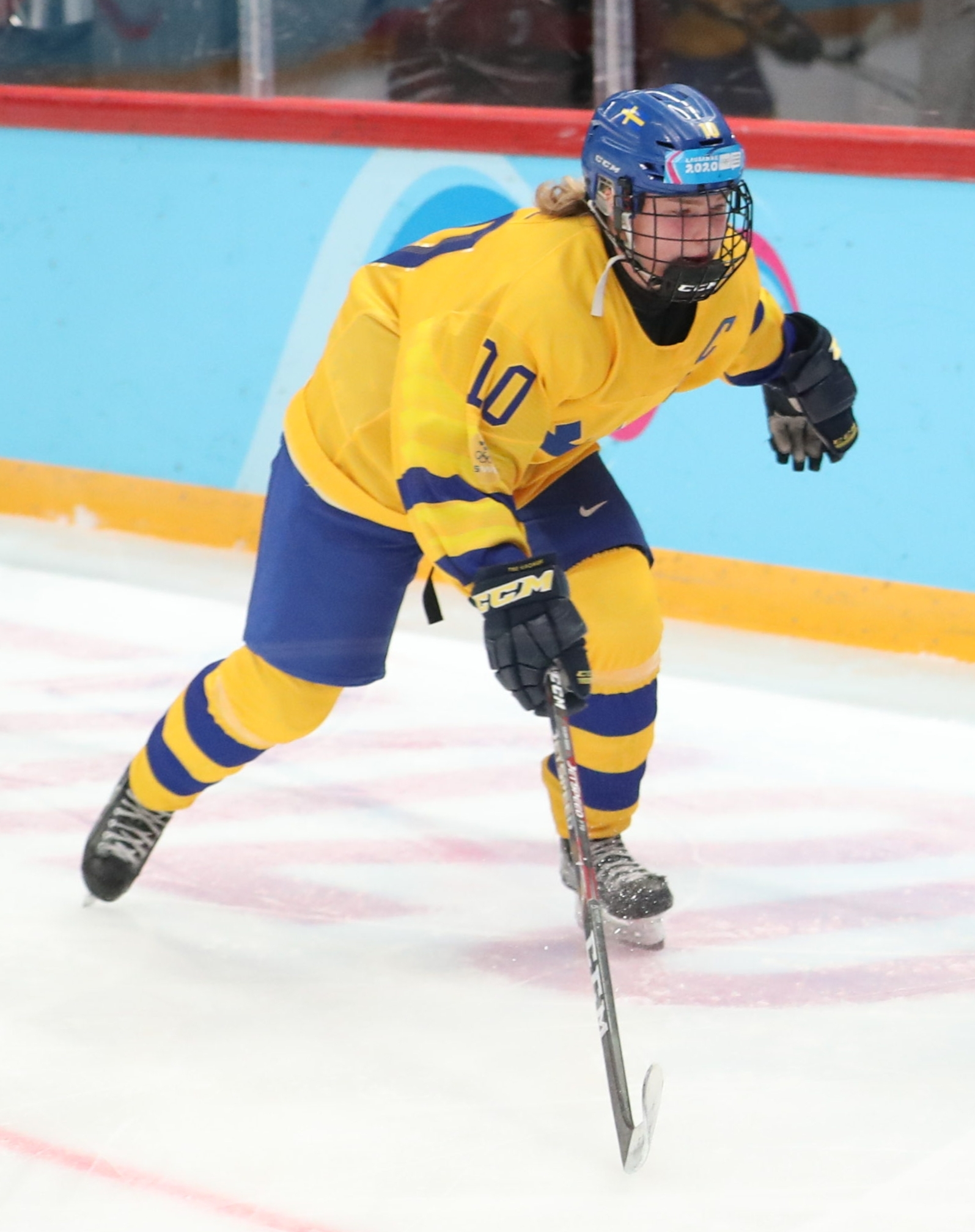
- Hall at the 2020 Winter Youth Olympics
- Born: 24 March 2004 (age 22) Stockholm, Sweden
- Height: 167 cm (5 ft 6 in)
- Weight: 72 kg (159 lb; 11 st 5 lb)
- Position: Forward
- Shoots: Left
- AHA team Former teams: Penn State; Leksands IF; Djurgårdens IF
- National team: Sweden
- Playing career: 2019–present
Medal record
World Championship
Bronze medal – third place	2026 Denmark

Nicole Felizia Birgitta Hall (born 24 March 2004) is a Swedish college ice hockey forward for Penn State of the National Collegiate Athletic Association (NCAA) and a member of Sweden women's national ice hockey team. She previously played for Leksands IF and Djurgårdens IF of the Swedish Women's Hockey League (SDHL).

== Playing career ==
Hall began her career with Leksands IF of the SDHL, before joining Djurgårdens IF. On 7 June 2023, she signed an extension with Djurgårdens. During four seasons with Djurgårdens she scored 70 points in 154 career games.

She began her collegiate career at Penn State during the 2024–25 season. During her freshman year, she recorded seven goals and four assists in 38 games. Hall was one of four Nittany Lions participating in women's ice hockey at the 2026 Winter Olympics, including Tessa Janecke, skating for Team USA, plus Matilde Fantin of Team Italy and Jessica Adolfsson, a teammate on Team Sweden.

== International play ==
Hall represented Sweden at the 2020 IIHF U18 Women's World Championship where she recorded one assist in five games. She then represented Sweden at the 2020 Winter Youth Olympics where she recorded three goals and two assists in four games and won a silver medal. During the gold medal game she scored Sweden's only goal in a 1–4 loss to Japan. She again competed at the 2022 IIHF U18 Women's World Championship where she served as team captain and recorded one goal and one assist in six games.

In June 2025, she was invited to Sweden's Olympic training camp. On 12 January 2026, she was named to Sweden's roster to compete at the 2026 Winter Olympics.

On 20 October 2026, she was selected to represent Sweden at the 2026 IIHF Women's World Championship. She recorded two goals in seven games to help Sweden win their first IIHF Women's World Championship medal since 2007.

== Personal life ==
Hall was born to Sussi and Uffe Hall, and has two older siblings Dennis and Jennie.

== Career statistics ==
=== Regular season and playoffs ===
			Regular season					Playoffs
Season	Team	League	GP	G	A	Pts	PIM	GP	G	A	Pts	PIM
2019–20	Leksands IF	SDHL	27	7	6	13	6	2	0	0	0	0
2020–21	Djurgårdens IF	SDHL	32	5	4	9	4	6	3	1	4	2
2021–22	Djurgårdens IF	SDHL	36	12	5	17	18	3	0	0	0	2
2022–23	Djurgårdens IF	SDHL	30	5	6	11	8	6	1	0	1	2
2023–24	Djurgårdens IF	SDHL	36	11	12	23	20	5	3	2	5	0
2024–25	Penn State University	AHA	38	7	4	11	10	—	—	—	—	—
2025–26	Penn State University	AHA	33	11	10	21	16	—	—	—	—	—
SDHL totals			161	40	33	73	56	22	7	3	10	6

=== International ===
Year	Team	Event	Result	GP	G	A	Pts	PIM
2020	Sweden	U18	5th	5	0	1	1	6
2022	Sweden	U18	4th	6	1	1	2	2
2026	Sweden	OG	4th	7	0	0	0	2
2026	Sweden	WC	3rd place, bronze medalist(s)	7	2	0	2	25
Junior totals				11	1	2	3	8
Seniors totals				14	2	0	2	27

== See also ==
- List of Pennsylvania State University Olympians
