= Michaela Hesová =

Czech ice hockey player (born 2005)

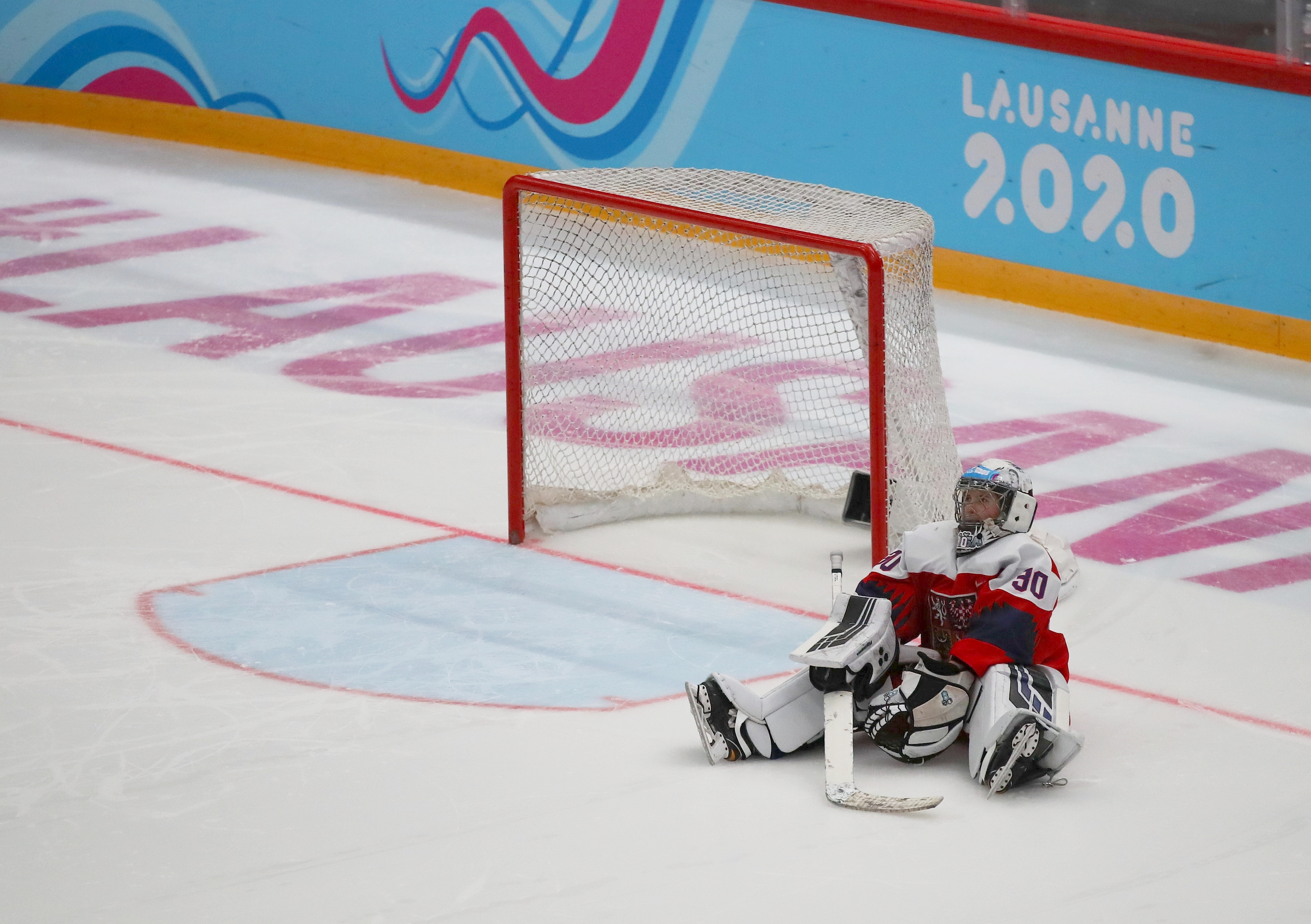
- Hesová at the 2020 Winter Youth Olympics
- Born: 2 November 2005 (age 20) Prague, Czech Republic
- Height: 1.69 m (5 ft 7 in)
- Position: Goaltender
- Catches: Left
- ECAC team: Dartmouth Big Green
- National team: Czech Republic
- Playing career: 2024–present
Medal record
World Championship
Bronze medal – third place	2023 Canada

Michaela Hesová (born 2 November 2005) is a Czech ice hockey goaltender. As member of the Czech national team since 2022, she won bronze at the 2023 IIHF Women's World Championship and participated in the women's ice hockey tournament at the 2026 Winter Olympics.

== Playing career ==
Hesová began playing with the Bishop Kearney Selects girls' ice hockey program in 2021. During her first season with the program, she played with the Selects under-16 team in the USHS of USA Hockey. In the 2022–23 season, she joined the Selects under-19 team in USA Hockey's 19U AAA league and competed in the 2023–24 19U Nationals with the team.

Hesová joined the Dartmouth Big Green women's ice hockey program in the ECAC Hockey conference of the NCAA Division I ahead of the 2024–25 season.

== International play ==
In January 2026, Hesová was named to the national team roster for the 2026 Winter Olympics, becoming the first Dartmouth College women's hockey athlete to compete at the Winter Olympics since Laura Stacey.

== Personal life ==
Hesová was born on 2 November 2005 in Prague, Czech Republic.

She attended Bishop Kearney High School in Irondequoit, New York. A student at Dartmouth College since 2024, she is a member of Sigma Delta sorority and the senior student council.
