= List of Vancouver Goldeneyes draft picks =

The Vancouver Goldeneyes are a professional ice hockey team in the Professional Women's Hockey League (PWHL) that was founded ahead of the 2025–26 season as an expansion team. Their first draft pick was Michelle Karvinen, selected seventh overall in the 2025 PWHL Draft. Vancouver has participated in two PWHL Drafts and have drafted ten players.

== Key ==
General terms and abbreviations
Term or abbreviation	Definition
Draft	The year that the player was selected
Round	The round of the draft in which the player was selected
Pick	The overall position in the draft at which the player was selected
Pos	Position of the player

Position abbreviations
Abbreviation	Definition
G	Goaltender
D	Defense
LW	Left wing
C	Center
RW	Right wing
F	Forward

== Draft picks ==
Full list of PWHL Vancouver draft picks
Draft	Round	Pick	Player	Nationality	Pos	School/club team	Conference/league
2025	1	7	Michelle Karvinen	Finland	F	Frölunda HC	SDHL
2025	3	19	Nina Jobst-Smith	Germany	F	University of Minnesota Duluth	WCHA
2025	4	32	Brianna Brooks	Canada	F	Penn State University	AHA
2025	5	39	Madison Samoskevich	United States	D	Quinnipiac University	ECAC
2025	6	48	Chanreet Bassi	Canada	F	University of British Columbia	Canada West
2026	1	1	Caroline Harvey	United States	D	University of Wisconsin	WCHA
2026	2	17	Thea Johansson	Sweden	F	University of Minnesota Duluth	WCHA
2026	3	25	Jules Constantinople	United States	D	Northeastern University	Hockey East
2026	4	37	Katie DeSa	United States	G	Penn State University	AHA
2026	6	61	Ashley Messier	United States	D	University of Minnesota Duluth	WCHA
