= Samoskevich =

Samoskevich is a surname. Notable people with the surname include:

- Mackie Samoskevich (born 2002), American ice hockey player
- Maddy Samoskevich (born 2002), American ice hockey player
- Melissa Samoskevich (born 1997), American ice hockey player and coach
