= 2019 IIHF U18 Women's World Championship =

Tournament details
- Host country: Japan
- Venue: 1 (in 1 host city)
- Dates: 6–13 January 2019
- Teams: 8

Final positions
- Champions: Canada (5th title)
- Runners-up: United States
- Third place: Finland
- Fourth place: Russia

Tournament statistics
- Games played: 22
- Goals scored: 98 (4.45 per game)
- Attendance: 9,031 (411 per game)
- Scoring leader: (Finland) Elisa Holopainen (8 points)

Awards
- MVP: (Canada) Raygan Kirk

Official website
- iihf.com/en/events/2019/ww18

The 2019 IIHF U18 Women's World Championship was the 12th IIHF U18 Women's World Championship in ice hockey. It was played at the Obihiro Arena in Obihiro, Japan from 6 to 13 January.

== Top Division ==
=== Preliminary round ===
All times are local (UTC+9).

==== Group A ====
Pos	Team	Pld	W	OTW	OTL	L	GF	GA	GD	Pts	Qualification
1	United States	3	3	0	0	0	8	4	+4	9	Semifinals
2	Canada	3	2	0	0	1	9	5	+4	6	Semifinals
3	Russia	3	1	0	0	2	8	11	−3	3	Quarterfinals
4	Sweden	3	0	0	0	3	4	9	−5	0	Quarterfinals

Source: IIHF
Rules for classification: 1) points; 2) head-to-head points; 3) head-to-head goal difference; 4) head-to-head number of goals scored; 5) result against closest best-ranked team outside tied teams; 6) result against second-best ranked team outside tied teams; 7) seeding before tournament.

6 January 2019; 13:00	Sweden	1–2 (0–1, 1–1, 0–0)	Canada	Obihiro Arena 1 Attendance: 350

Game reference

Tindra Holm
Goalies
Mahika Sarrazin
Referees:
(Czech Republic) Gabriela Malá
(Germany) Ramona Weiß
Linesmen:
(United States) Kristin Moore
(Finland) Linnea Sainio

	0–1	11:36 – Calabrese (Wheeler, Markowski)
	0–2	28:51 – Serdachny (J. Gosling, Markowski) (PP)
G. Johansson (Mogren, Forsberg) – 31:57	1–2

16 min
Penalties
12 min
10
Shots
34

6 January 2019; 17:00	United States	3–2 (1–1, 2–1, 0–0)	Russia	Obihiro Arena 1 Attendance: 300

Game reference

Skylar Vetter
Goalies
Daria Gredzen
Referees:
(Finland) Anniina Nurmi
(Czech Republic) Radka Růžičková
Linesmen:
(Norway) Stephanie Cole
(Hungary) Zita Gebora

Webster (Bilka, Winn) (PP) – 04:55	1–0
	1–1	05:58 – Markova (Mezentseva)
O'Brien (Webster) – 22:51	2–1
Shearen (Eden, Nicholson) – 25:33	3–1
	3–2	36:59 – Mezentseva (Markova) (PP)

14 min
Penalties
14 min
38
Shots
21

7 January 2019; 13:00	Sweden	3–5 (0–1, 1–1, 2–3)	Russia	Obihiro Arena 1 Attendance: 170

Game reference

Tindra Holm
Goalies
Anna Alpatova
Referees:
(United States) Kaylen Erchul
(Canada) Élizabeth Mantha
Linesmen:
(Canada) Marie-Pierre Jalbert
(Germany) Svenja Strohmenger

	0–1	05:47 – Shkalyova (Mezentseva, Markova)
Olsson (Bouveng) – 27:34	1–1
	1–2	30:02 – Shkalyova (Markova, Golovkina)
Ljungblom (Bouveng) (PP) – 40:34	2–2
	2–3	44:06 – Shkalyova (Lopukhova, Savonina)
Bouveng – 51:02	3–3
	3–4	56:38 – Akhmetova (Luchnikova, Shashkina)
	3–5	58:37 – Ponyatovskaya (Savonina)

16 min
Penalties
14 min
28
Shots
32

7 January 2019; 17:00	Canada	2–3 (1–0, 1–2, 0–1)	United States	Obihiro Arena 1 Attendance: 490

Game reference

Raygan Kirk
Goalies
Skylar Vetter
Referees:
(Russia) Daria Ermak
(Germany) Tijana Haack
Linesmen:
(Sweden) Anna Hammar
(Finland) Linnea Sainio

J. Gosling (Wheeler) – 17:54	1–0
Cote (N. Gosling) – 21:26	2–0
	2–1	24:08 – Petrie
	2–2	24:22 – Murphy (Winn)
	2–3	43:41 – Murphy (O'Brien)

10 min
Penalties
10 min
20
Shots
23

9 January 2019; 13:00	Russia	1–5 (0–3, 0–1, 1–1)	Canada	Obihiro Arena 1 Attendance: 240

Game reference

Daria Gredzen
Anna Alpatova
Goalies
Raygan Kirk
Referees:
(Japan) Anna Kuroda
(United States) Jestina Vichorek
Linesmen:
(United Kingdom) Amy Lack
(United States) Kristin Moore

	0–1	16:07 – Guay (Cooper) (PP)
	0–2	16:43 – Cherkowski (Weiss)
	0–3	17:32 – Shirley (Cooper, Guay) (PP)
	0–4	21:32 – Grant (Wheeler, Guay)
Shkalyova (Mezentseva) (PP) – 43:21	1–4
	1–5	44:45 – Markowski (Cherkowski, Wheeler) (PP2)

28 min
Penalties
14 min
11
Shots
42

9 January 2019; 17:00	United States	2–0 (0–0, 1–0, 1–0)	Sweden	Obihiro Arena 1 Attendance: 280

Game reference
Skylar Vetter	Goalies	Amanda Johansson	Referees: (Canada) Élizabeth Mantha (Czech Republic) Radka Růžičková; Linesmen: (Hungary) Zita Gebora (Russia) Diana Mokhova
Eden (Zanon, Hartmetz) (EA) – 32:37 / 1–0; Knoll (Murphy, Bernard) (PP) – 41:48 / 2–0			Referees: (Canada) Élizabeth Mantha (Czech Republic) Radka Růžičková; Linesmen: (Hungary) Zita Gebora (Russia) Diana Mokhova
8 min	Penalties	10 min	Referees: (Canada) Élizabeth Mantha (Czech Republic) Radka Růžičková; Linesmen: (Hungary) Zita Gebora (Russia) Diana Mokhova
40	Shots	17	Referees: (Canada) Élizabeth Mantha (Czech Republic) Radka Růžičková; Linesmen: (Hungary) Zita Gebora (Russia) Diana Mokhova

==== Group B ====
Pos	Team	Pld	W	OTW	OTL	L	GF	GA	GD	Pts	Qualification
1	Finland	3	3	0	0	0	8	4	+4	9	Quarterfinals
2	Switzerland	3	2	0	0	1	5	5	0	6	Quarterfinals
3	Czech Republic	3	1	0	0	2	5	5	0	3	Relegation round
4	Japan (H)	3	0	0	0	3	4	8	−4	0	Relegation round

Source: IIHF
Rules for classification: 1) points; 2) head-to-head points; 3) head-to-head goal difference; 4) head-to-head number of goals scored; 5) result against closest best-ranked team outside tied teams; 6) result against second-best ranked team outside tied teams; 7) seeding before tournament.
(H) Host

6 January 2019; 14:30	Finland	2–1 (1–1, 1–0, 0–0)	Japan	Obihiro Arena 2 Attendance: 1,064

Game reference

Erica Jaskari
Goalies
Reika Sasaki
Referees:
(United States) Kaylen Erchul
(Germany) Tijana Haack
Linesmen:
(Canada) Marie-Pierre Jalbert
(United Kingdom) Amy Lack

Holopainen (Vainikka, Laitinen) (PP) – 17:44	1–0
	1–1	18:56 – A. Sasaki (Wajima, M. Tsutsumi)
Holopainen (Vainikka) – 36:13	2–1

6 min
Penalties
8 min
19
Shots
19

6 January 2019; 18:30	Czech Republic	0–1 (0–1, 0–0, 0–0)	Switzerland	Obihiro Arena 2 Attendance: 117

Game reference
Julie Pejšová	Goalies	Saskia Maurer	Referees: (Russia) Daria Ermak (United States) Jestina Vichorek; Linesmen: (Sweden) Anna Hammar (Russia) Diana Mokhova
0–1 / 09:50 – Zimmermann (Pagnamenta, Leemann) (PP)			Referees: (Russia) Daria Ermak (United States) Jestina Vichorek; Linesmen: (Sweden) Anna Hammar (Russia) Diana Mokhova
10 min	Penalties	8 min	Referees: (Russia) Daria Ermak (United States) Jestina Vichorek; Linesmen: (Sweden) Anna Hammar (Russia) Diana Mokhova
36	Shots	9	Referees: (Russia) Daria Ermak (United States) Jestina Vichorek; Linesmen: (Sweden) Anna Hammar (Russia) Diana Mokhova

7 January 2019; 14:30	Czech Republic	4–2 (1–0, 2–1, 1–1)	Japan	Obihiro Arena 2 Attendance: 586

Game reference

Julie Pejšová
Goalies
Reika Sasaki
Referees:
(Finland) Anniina Nurmi
(Germany) Ramona Weiß
Linesmen:
(Hungary) Zita Gebora
(United States) Kristin Moore

Mlýnková – 08:43	1–0
	1–1	30:58 – Suzuki (Shiga, Nomura) (PP)
Haasová (Exnerová, Kaltounková) – 32:20	2–1
Mlýnková (D. Pejšová, Kotounová) – 38:55	3–1
	3–2	56:38 – A. Sasaki (M. Tsutsumi)
Čajanová – 58:31	4–2

16 min
Penalties
4 min
26
Shots
31

7 January 2019; 18:30	Switzerland	2–4 (0–0, 0–2, 2–2)	Finland	Obihiro Arena 2 Attendance: 147

Game reference

Saskia Maurer
Goalies
Erica Jaskari
Referees:
(Japan) Anna Kuroda
(Czech Republic) Radka Růžičková
Linesmen:
(Norway) Stephanie Cole
(Russia) Diana Mokhova

	0–1	24:51 – Liikala (Kaila, Seikkula)
	0–2	38:46 – Holopainen (Vainikka)
Neuenschwander – 42:16	1–2
Christen (Zimmermann) (PP) – 43:16	2–2
	2–3	53:07 – Vainikka (Holopainen)
	2–4	54:54 – Timonen (Seikkula)

2 min
Penalties
12 min
9
Shots
28

9 January 2019; 14:30	Japan	1–2 (0–1, 1–1, 0–0)	Switzerland	Obihiro Arena 2 Attendance: 702

Game reference

Rei Halloran
Reika Sasaki
Goalies
Saskia Maurer
Referees:
(Germany) Tijana Haack
(Czech Republic) Gabriela Malá
Linesmen:
(Sweden) Anna Hammar
(Finland) Linnea Sainio

	0–1	11:54 – Pagnamenta (Zimmermann)
Shiga (Ito, Sato) (PP2) – 24:30	1–1
	1–2	30:52 – Ingold (Pagnamenta) (SH)

12 min
Penalties
12 min
29
Shots
15

9 January 2019; 18:30	Finland	2–1 (0–0, 1–0, 1–1)	Czech Republic	Obihiro Arena 2 Attendance: 109

Game reference

Erica Jaskari
Goalies
Julie Pejšová
Referees:
(United States) Kaylen Erchul
(Russia) Daria Ermak
Linesmen:
(Norway) Stephanie Cole
(Germany) Svenja Strohmenger

Holopainen (Laitinen, Rantala) (PP) – 24:07	1–0
	1–1	57:04 – Haasová (Kaltounková)
Yrjänen (Seikkula) (ENG) – 59:26	2–1

10 min
Penalties
6 min
20
Shots
25

=== Relegation round ===
The third and fourth placed team from Group B played a best-of-three series to determine the relegated team.

10 January 2019; 14:30	Czech Republic	6–0 (2–0, 2–0, 2–0)	Japan	Obihiro Arena 2 Attendance: 238

Game reference

Julie Pejšová
Goalies
Reika Sasaki
Rei Halloran
Referees:
(Finland) Anniina Nurmi
(Germany) Ramona Weiß
Linesmen:
(Canada) Marie-Pierre Jalbert
(Germany) Svenja Strohmenger

D. Pejšová (Kaltounková) – 03:07	1–0
Škrdlová (Seroiszková, Dýcková) – 04:06	2–0
Mazancová (Kaltounková) – 35:25	3–0
Mazancová (Haasová, Kaltounková) – 36:58	4–0
Mlýnková (Dýcková, Čajanová) – 46:49	5–0
Hanzlíková (Seroiszková) (PP) – 54:52	6–0

2 min
Penalties
8 min
26
Shots
9

12 January 2019; 14:30	Japan	2–1 (0–1, 1–0, 1–0)	Czech Republic	Obihiro Arena 2 Attendance: 783

Game reference

Reika Sasaki
Goalies
Julie Pejšová
Referees:
(Germany) Tijana Haack
(Finland) Anniina Nurmi
Linesmen:
(Hungary) Zita Gebora
(Russia) Diana Mokhova

	0–1	04:54 – Haasová (Mazancová, Kaltounková)
Sonoya (Sato) – 22:57	1–1
Ito (Wajima) – 45:12	2–1

2 min
Penalties
8 min
24
Shots
15

13 January 2019; 13:00	Czech Republic	3–1 (0–0, 1–0, 2–1)	Japan	Obihiro Arena 2 Attendance: 746

Game reference

Julie Pejšová
Goalies
Reika Sasaki
Referees:
(United States) Kaylen Erchul
(Russia) Daria Ermak
Linesmen:
(Canada) Marie-Pierre Jalbert
(United Kingdom) Amy Lack

Mlýnková (Seroiszková) – 23:13	1–0
Jandušíková (Sýkorová, Škrdlová) – 46:39	2–0
Mlýnková – 58:42	3–0
	3–1	59:28 – Ito (Suzuki) (EA)

8 min
Penalties
4 min
20
Shots
18

=== Final round ===
==== Bracket ====
Quarterfinals
A4	Sweden	2
B1	Finland (OT)	3
A3	Russia (GWS)	2
B2	Switzerland	1

Semifinals
A1	United States	7
B1	Finland	1
A2	Canada (OT)	4
A3	Russia	3

Final
A1	United States	2
A2	Canada (OT)	3
Third place
A3	Russia	0
B1	Finland	3

==== Quarterfinals ====
10 January 2019; 14:30	Sweden	2–3 OT (0–0, 1–1, 1–1) (OT: 0–1)	Finland	Obihiro Arena 1 Attendance: 140

Game reference

Tindra Holm
Goalies
Erica Jaskari
Referees:
(Japan) Anna Kuroda
(Canada) Élizabeth Mantha
Linesmen:
(Hungary) Zita Gebora
(United Kingdom) Amy Lack

	0–1	22:54 – Rantala (Holopainen, Vainikka) (PP)
Thuvik (Forsgren) – 38:44	1–1
T. Johansson (Waxin, Antonsson) (PP) – 57:32	2–1
	2–2	58:08 – Laitinen (EA)
	2–3	65:34 – Holopainen (Yrjänen)

8 min
Penalties
8 min
26
Shots
30

10 January 2019; 18:30	Russia	2–1 GWS (1–0, 0–0, 0–1) (OT: 0–0) (SO: 1–0)	Switzerland	Obihiro Arena 1 Attendance: 120

Game reference
Daria Gredzen	Goalies	Saskia Maurer	Referees: (Czech Republic) Gabriela Malá (United States) Jestina Vichorek; Linesmen: (Norway) Stephanie Cole (Sweden) Anna Hammar
Shashkina (Namestnikova) (PP) – 10:17 / 1–0; / 1–1 / 56:08 – Christen (PP)			Referees: (Czech Republic) Gabriela Malá (United States) Jestina Vichorek; Linesmen: (Norway) Stephanie Cole (Sweden) Anna Hammar
Shkalyova (miss); Markova (miss); Pushkar; Tsatsyna (miss); Mezentseva (miss); Pushkar (miss); Ponyatovskaya (miss); Pushkar (miss); Mezentseva (miss); Provorova	Shootout	Ingold; (miss) Christen; (miss) Vallario; (miss) Leemann; (miss) Zimmermann; (miss) Ingold; (miss) Pagnamenta; (miss) Leemann; (miss) Zimmermann; (miss) Christen	Referees: (Czech Republic) Gabriela Malá (United States) Jestina Vichorek; Linesmen: (Norway) Stephanie Cole (Sweden) Anna Hammar
16 min	Penalties	8 min	Referees: (Czech Republic) Gabriela Malá (United States) Jestina Vichorek; Linesmen: (Norway) Stephanie Cole (Sweden) Anna Hammar
31	Shots	18	Referees: (Czech Republic) Gabriela Malá (United States) Jestina Vichorek; Linesmen: (Norway) Stephanie Cole (Sweden) Anna Hammar

==== Semifinals ====
12 January 2019; 13:00	United States	7–1 (4–0, 0–0, 3–1)	Finland	Obihiro Arena 1 Attendance: 300

Game reference

Skylar Vetter
Goalies
Erica Jaskari
Aino Laitinen
Referees:
(Russia) Daria Ermak
(Czech Republic) Gabriela Malá
Linesmen:
(Norway) Stephanie Cole
(Canada) Marie-Pierre Jalbert

Knoll (Bilka, Samoskevich) – 02:43	1–0
Bilka (Knoll) – 05:51	2–0
Murphy (Webster) – 08:09	3–0
Petrie (Knoll) (PP) – 19:36	4–0
Knoll (Petrie) – 43:47	5–0
Samoskevich (Bard, Hartmetz) (PP) – 48:15	6–0
Webster (Monihan) – 50:09	7–0
	7–1	56:08 – Liikala (Yrjänen, Nuutinen)

4 min
Penalties
10 min
36
Shots
18

12 January 2019; 17:00	Canada	4–3 OT (1–1, 2–1, 0–1) (OT: 1–0)	Russia	Obihiro Arena 1 Attendance: 330

Game reference

Raygan Kirk
Goalies
Daria Gredzen
Referees:
(United States) Kaylen Erchul
(Germany) Ramona Weiß
Linesmen:
(United Kingdom) Amy Lack
(Germany) Svenja Strohmenger

	0–1	09:03 – Savonina (Luchnikova) (PP)
Kelly (Trevors, MacEachern) – 11:49	1–1
Guay (Wheeler, Calabrese) – 21:28	2–1
	2–2	27:46 – Markova (Savonina, Volf) (PP)
J. Gosling (Guay) (PP) – 39:36	3–2
	3–3	51:51 – Provorova (Shkalyova, Markova) (PP)
Serdachny (PP) – 60:44	4–3

14 min
Penalties
12 min
30
Shots
13

==== Fifth place game ====
12 January 2019; 18:30	Sweden	2–1 (1–1, 1–0, 0–0)	Switzerland	Obihiro Arena 2 Attendance: 152

Game reference

Amanda Johansson
Goalies
Saskia Maurer
Referees:
(Japan) Anna Kuroda
(Czech Republic) Radka Růžičková
Linesmen:
(United States) Kristin Moore
(Finland) Linnea Sainio

	0–1	02:18 – Ingold (Zimmermann, Surdez)
Ljungblom (Waxin, Olsson) – 02:56	1–1
Blom (Ljungblom, Thuvik) (PP) – 25:25	2–1

6 min
Penalties
2 min
31
Shots
12

==== Bronze medal game ====
13 January 2019; 13:00	Russia	0–3 (0–0, 0–2, 0–1)	Finland	Obihiro Arena 1 Attendance: 140

Game reference

Daria Gredzen
Anna Alpatova
Goalies
Erica Jaskari
Referees:
(Canada) Élizabeth Mantha
(United States) Jestina Vichorek
Linesmen:
(Sweden) Anna Hammar
(United States) Kristin Moore

0–1	22:59 – Vainikka (Laitinen, Holopainen)
0–2	23:32 – Suoranta (Ahlskog, Seikkula)
0–3	59:56 – Liikala (Seikkula) (PP, EN)

6 min
Penalties
16 min
25
Shots
19

==== Gold medal game ====
13 January 2019; 17:00	United States	2–3 OT (0–1, 1–0, 1–1) (OT: 0–1)	Canada	Obihiro Arena 1 Attendance: 1,527

Game reference

Skylar Vetter
Goalies
Raygan Kirk
Referees:
(Germany) Tijana Haack
(Finland) Anniina Nurmi
Linesmen:
(Russia) Diana Mokhova
(Finland) Linnea Sainio

	0–1	07:44 – Serdachny (J. Gosling, Guay) (PP)
Webster (Winn, Nicholson) (PP) – 37:10	1–1
Murphy (O'Brien, Webster) – 46:07	2–1
	2–2	51:11 – Cherkowski (Serdachny, J. Gosling) (PP)
	2–3	61:34 – Wheeler (PP)

16 min
Penalties
18 min
27
Shots
27

=== Final ranking ===
Pos	Grp	Team	Pld	W	OTW	OTL	L	GF	GA	GD	Pts	Final result
1	A	Canada	5	2	2	0	1	16	10	+6	10	Champions
2	A	United States	5	4	0	1	0	17	8	+9	13	Runners-up
3	B	Finland	6	4	1	0	1	15	13	+2	14	Third place
4	A	Russia	6	1	1	1	3	13	19	−6	6	Fourth place
5	A	Sweden	5	1	0	1	3	8	13	−5	4	Fifth place game
6	B	Switzerland	5	2	0	1	2	7	9	−2	7	Fifth place game
7	B	Czech Republic	6	3	0	0	3	15	8	+7	9	Advance in Relegation
8	B	Japan (H)	6	1	0	0	5	7	18	−11	3	Relegation to Division I A

Source: IIHF
(H) Host

=== Statistics ===
==== Scoring leaders ====
Pos	Player	Country	GP	G	A	Pts	+/−	PIM
1	Elisa Holopainen	Finland	6	5	3	8	+2	6
2	Makenna Webster	United States	5	3	3	6	+4	0
3	Alexie Guay	Canada	5	2	4	6	+2	8
4	Ilona Markova	Russia	6	2	4	6	0	0
4	Viivi Vainikka	Finland	6	2	4	6	+2	2
6	Maddi Wheeler	Canada	5	1	5	6	+4	2
7	Kristýna Kaltounková	Czech Republic	6	0	6	6	+6	8
8	Natálie Mlýnková	Czech Republic	6	5	0	5	+6	10
9	Abbey Murphy	United States	5	4	1	5	+5	8
10	Yelizaveta Shkalyova	Russia	6	4	1	5	0	2

GP = Games played; G = Goals; A = Assists; Pts = Points; +/− = P Plus–minus; PIM = Penalties In Minutes
Source: IIHF

==== Goaltending leaders ====
(minimum 40% team's total ice time)

Pos	Player	Country	TOI	GA	GAA	SA	Sv%	SO
1	Saskia Maurer	Switzerland	308:58	8	1.55	154	94.81	1
2	Julie Pejšová	Czech Republic	358:42	7	1.17	110	93.64	1
3	Skylar Vetter	United States	301:34	8	1.59	103	92.23	1
4	Erica Jaskari	Finland	313:29	9	1.72	111	91.89	1
5	Tindra Holm	Sweden	185:34	10	3.23	96	89.58	0

TOI = Time On Ice (minutes:seconds); GA = Goals against; GAA = Goals against average; SA = Shots against; Sv% = Save percentage; SO = Shutouts
Source: IIHF

=== Awards ===
==== Best players selected by the directorate ====
- Best Goaltender: (Switzerland) Saskia Maurer
- Best Defenceman: (Canada) Alexie Guay
- Best Forward: (Finland) Elisa Holopainen

==== Media All-Stars ====
- MVP: (Canada) Raygan Kirk
- Goaltender: (Switzerland) Saskia Maurer
- Defencemen: (Canada) Alexie Guay / (Finland) Nelli Laitinen
- Forwards: (Finland) Elisa Holopainen / (United States) Katy Knoll / (Russia) Ilona Markova

== Division I ==
=== Group A ===
The Division I Group A tournament was held in Radenthein, Austria from 7 to 13 January 2019.

Pos	Team	Pld	W	OTW	OTL	L	GF	GA	GD	Pts	Promotion or relegation
1	Slovakia	5	4	0	0	1	14	9	+5	12	Promoted to the 2020 Top Division
2	Germany	5	3	1	0	1	21	8	+13	11	
3	Hungary	5	3	0	1	1	13	9	+4	10	
4	Italy	5	1	1	1	2	9	16	−7	6	
5	Denmark	5	1	0	1	3	9	15	−6	4	
6	Austria (H)	5	0	1	0	4	3	12	−9	2	Relegated to the 2020 Division I B

Source: IIHF
Rules for classification: 1) points; 2) head-to-head points; 3) head-to-head goal difference; 4) head-to-head number of goals scored; 5) result against closest best-ranked team outside tied teams; 6) result against second-best ranked team outside tied teams; 7) seeding before tournament.
(H) Host

=== Group B ===
The Division I Group B tournament was held in Dumfries, Great Britain from 6 to 12 January 2019.

Pos	Team	Pld	W	OTW	OTL	L	GF	GA	GD	Pts	Promotion or relegation
1	France	5	4	0	1	0	18	2	+16	13	Promoted to the 2020 Division I A
2	Norway	5	3	1	1	0	14	4	+10	12	
3	Great Britain (H)	5	2	1	1	1	7	7	0	9	
4	Poland	5	2	1	0	2	12	14	−2	8	
5	China	5	1	0	0	4	6	16	−10	3	
6	Netherlands	5	0	0	0	5	5	19	−14	0	Relegated to the 2020 Division II A

Source: IIHF
Rules for classification: 1) points; 2) head-to-head points; 3) head-to-head goal difference; 4) head-to-head number of goals scored; 5) result against closest best-ranked team outside tied teams; 6) result against second-best ranked team outside tied teams; 7) seeding before tournament.
(H) Host

=== Group B Qualification ===
The Division I Group B Qualification tournament was held in Jaca, Spain from 12 to 18 January 2019. For 2020 it was decided to create a Division II and split the teams into two groups. The teams that did not make the semifinals were essentially relegated to Division II B.

==== 5th–7th place playoffs ====
5th−7th place semifinal
16 January
Turkey	1
Mexico	0

5th place match
18 January
Turkey	0
Spain	7

==== Championship playoffs ====
Semifinals
16 January
Kazakhstan	3
Chinese Taipei	1
16 January
South Korea	5
Australia	2

Final
18 January
Kazakhstan	3
South Korea (GWS)	4
3rd place match
18 January
Chinese Taipei	6
Australia	2
