= PWHL Draft =

Sport event

The PWHL Draft (French: Repêchage de la LPHF) is an annual meeting in which every franchise of the Professional Women's Hockey League (PWHL) systematically select the rights to available ice hockey players who meet draft eligibility requirements. The PWHL Draft is held once every year, generally within a month after the conclusion of the previous regular season. During the draft, teams take turns selecting amateur players from collegiate leagues and professional players from European leagues.

The first draft was held in 2023, and has been held every year since.

== History ==
The inaugural PWHL Draft was held in 2023. The order of picks in the first round was decided by using a computerized list randomizer during a video conference call with all six team's general managers. In the second round this order was reversed, so the team with the 6th pick would also receive the 7th pick, whilst the team with first overall pick would not pick again until the 12th pick (last pick in the second round). The order would continue alternating in each subsequent round, producing a 'snaking' order.

== Selection order ==
The selection order in the PWHL Draft for the top two selections is determined by the Gold Plan, where standings points accumulated by a team that can no longer make the playoffs count as draft order points, and the team with the most draft order points received the first overall selection. Picks three through six went to the four playoff teams, in reverse order of regular season standings. The draft order was the same in each subsequent round.

== Eligible players ==
There is no minimum or maximum age requirement for players to be drafted in the PWHL. To be eligible for the draft, players need to declare their eligibility during the declaration period. Selected players may re-enter the draft if they are not signed to their draft club after two years. No player may declare for more than two drafts.

== List of PWHL Drafts ==
Draft	Location	City	Date	Rounds	Total drafted	No. 1 pick
2023	Canadian Broadcasting Centre	Toronto, Ontario	September 18, 2023	15	90	Taylor Heise (PWHL Minnesota)
2024	Roy Wilkins Auditorium	Saint Paul, Minnesota	June 10, 2024	7	42	Sarah Fillier (PWHL New York)
2025	Hard Rock Hotel & Casino	Ottawa, Ontario	June 24, 2025	6	48	Kristýna Kaltounková (New York Sirens)
2026	Fox Theatre	Detroit, Michigan	June 17, 2026	6	72	Caroline Harvey (Vancouver Goldeneyes)

== See also ==
- NHL entry draft
