= List of first overall PWHL draft picks =

The Professional Women's Hockey League's first overall pick is the player who is selected first among all eligible draftees by a team during the annual Professional Women's Hockey League (PWHL) draft.

== List of first overall picks ==
!	Hockey Hall of Fame inductee
^	IIHF Hall of Fame inductee
^{+}	Selected for an All-Star Showcase
^{x}	Selected for an All-Star Team
#	Rookie of the Year winner

Draft	Selected by	Player	Nationality	Position	College / former club	PWHL rookie statistics				Ref.
Draft	Selected by	Player	Nationality	Position	College / former club	Games	Goals	Assists	PIM	Ref.
2023	PWHL Minnesota	Taylor Heise ^{+}	United States	Forward	Minnesota	19	4	9	8	
2024	PWHL New York	Sarah Fillier ^{#}^{x}	Canada	Centre	Princeton	30	13	16	35	
2025	New York Sirens	Kristýna Kaltounková	Czech Republic	Centre	Colgate	21	11	1	45	
2026	Vancouver Goldeneyes	Caroline Harvey	United States	Defender	Wisconsin	TBD				

== See also ==
- List of first overall NWSL draft picks
- List of first overall WNBA draft picks
