= Melissa Samoskevich =

American ice hockey player

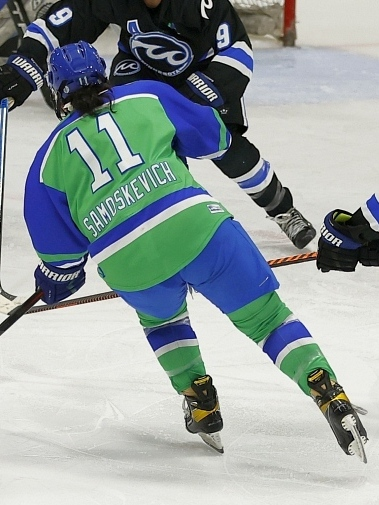
- Samoskevich with the Connecticut Whale in 2023
- Born: March 31, 1997 (age 29) Bridgeport, Connecticut, U.S.
- Height: 5 ft 4 in (163 cm)
- Weight: 168 lb (76 kg; 12 st 0 lb)
- Position: Forward
- Shoots: Left
- Played for: Connecticut Whale; Brynäs IF; Quinnipiac Bobcats
- National team: United States
- Playing career: 2015–present
Medal record
World Championship
Gold medal – first place	2019 Finland

Melissa Samoskevich (born March 31, 1997) is a former American ice hockey player and director of player development and operations for the Quinnipiac Bobcats women's ice hockey program. She was previously an assistant coach for the Penn State Nittany Lions women's ice hockey program. She also played for the Connecticut Whale of the now defunct Premier Hockey Federation.

A former member of the United States women's national ice hockey team, she won a gold medal at the 2019 IIHF Women's World Championship.

== Playing career ==
Across 144 NCAA games with the Quinnipiac Bobcats women's ice hockey program, Samoskevich scored 109 points, the fourth highest total in the university's history. She was named ECAC Hockey Rookie of the Year in 2016, and would serve as the team's captain in her two final seasons.

She was drafted by the Connecticut Whale 2nd overall in the 2018 NWHL Draft. She would sign her first professional contract with Brynäs IF Dam in the Swedish Women's Hockey League (SDHL) for the 2019–20 season, but would only play 8 games with the club before leaving due to homesickness. She spent the rest of the 2019–20 season with the New England chapter of the Professional Women's Hockey Players Association (PWHPA), and appeared with Team Coyne at the Secret Women’s Hockey Showcase.

In June 2020, she signed with the Connecticut Whale. On August 18, 2020, Samoskevich was announced as a new assistant coach for the Penn State Nittany Lions women's ice hockey program. Her coaching duties with Penn State prevented her from joining the Whale for the COVID-19 Bubble of the 2020–21 NWHL season. Samoskevich returned to the Whale during the 2021–22 PHF season. On August 22, 2022, the Whale announced that she had signed a one-year contract for the 2022–23 PHF season.

== International play ==
She represented the United States at the 2019 IIHF Women's World Championship. She had previously represented the country at the 2018 4 Nations Cup and the IIHF World Women's U18 Championship in 2014 and 2015.

== Post-playing career ==
Prior to the 2022–23 college hockey season, Samoskevich was named director of player development and operations for the Quinnipiac Bobcats women's ice hockey program.

In July 2024 she joined The University of Delaware as an Assistant coach.

== Personal life ==
Samoskevich attended Shattuck-Saint Mary's for high school and played ice hockey with the school's under-16 and prep teams, serving as captain of Shattuck St. Mary's Prep during her senior season. She has a degree in history. Her sister, Maddy, played college ice hockey for Quinnipiac, and was drafted by PWHL Vancouver in the 2025 PWHL Draft. Her brother, Mackie, was drafted 24th overall by the Florida Panthers in the 2021 NHL entry draft.

== Career statistics ==
			Regular season					Playoffs
Season	Team	League	GP	G	A	Pts	PIM	GP	G	A	Pts	PIM
2015-16	Quinnipiac University	ECAC Hockey	38	16	16	32	10	–	–	–	–	–
2016-17	Quinnipiac University	ECAC Hockey	37	10	19	29	12	–	–	–	–	–
2017-18	Quinnipiac University	ECAC Hockey	35	15	10	25	8	–	–	–	–	–
2018-19	Quinnipiac University	ECAC Hockey	34	13	10	23	10	–	–	–	–	–
2019–20	Brynäs IF	SDHL	8	0	6	6	2	–	–	–	–	–
2021-22	Connecticut Whale (PHF)	PHF	7	1	1	2	0	2	0	0	0	0
2022-23	Connecticut Whale (PHF)	PHF	24	7	9	16	11	3	1	1	2	0
PHF totals			31	8	10	18	11	5	1	1	2	–
