= Emma Ingold =

Swiss ice hockey player

- Born: 12 August 2002 (age 24)
- Height: 171 cm (5 ft 7 in)
- Weight: 61 kg (134 lb; 9 st 8 lb)
- Position: Forward
- Shoots: Right
- SWHL A team Former teams: Neuchâtel Hockey Academy; EV Bomo Thun
- National team: Switzerland
- Playing career: 2014–present

Emma Ingold (born 12 August 2002) is a Swiss ice hockey player and member of the Swiss national ice hockey team, currently playing in the Women's League (SWHL A) with the Neuchâtel Hockey Academy.

Ingold represented Switzerland at the 2021 IIHF Women's World Championship. As a junior player with the Swiss national under-18 team, she participated in the IIHF Women's U18 World Championships in 2018, 2019, and 2020.
