= Ilona Markova =

Russian ice hockey player (born 2002)

Ilona Markova Илона Маркова
- Born: 18 January 2002 (age 24) Kirov, Kirov Oblast, Russia
- Height: 166 cm (5 ft 5 in)
- Weight: 55 kg (121 lb; 8 st 9 lb)
- Position: Forward
- Shoots: Left
- ZhHL team Former teams: Agidel Ufa; SKIF Nizhny Novgorod
- National team: Russia
- Playing career: 2017–present

Ilona Vladimirovna Markova (Russian: Илона Владимировна Маркова; born 18 January 2002) is a Russian ice hockey player and member of the Russian national team. She has played in the Zhenskaya Hockey League (ZhHL) with Agidel Ufa since 2018.

== Playing career ==
As a child, Markova participated in rhythmic gymnastics and figure skating. Her mother encouraged her to begin playing ice hockey and, despite early hesitation, she ultimately chose to commit to the sport.

Markova made her senior club debut at age fifteen, with SKIF Nizhny Novgorod in the 2017–18 season of the Zhenskaya Hockey League (ZhHL). She joined Agidel Ufa ahead of the 2018–19 season and played with the team through the 2023–24 season, twice winning the ZhHL Championship. She was selected to the ZhHL All-Star Game in 2022 and 2024.

On 10 June 2024, Markova became the first Russian player to be drafted into the PWHL when she was selected in the seventh round, 37th overall, by the Boston Fleet in the 2024 PWHL draft. No Russian players declared eligibility for the 2023 PWHL draft and Markova was the only Russian player to declare for the 2024 PWHL draft. She was invited to the Fleet's training camp for the 2024–25 season and secured the travel documents necessary to join the team from the beginning of camp. Markova was not signed during camp and became waiver eligible on 26 November 2024. As she was not signed by the end of the waiver period, her rights remained with the Boston Fleet.

Following her release from the Fleet, Markova returned to Agidel Ufa for the remainder of the 2024–25 ZhHL season.

In January 2026, Markova joined the UBC Thunderbirds team, the program represent the University of British Columbia in the Canada West Universities Athletic Association.

=== International play ===
As a junior player with the Russian national under-18 team, she participated in the IIHF U18 Women's World Championships in 2018, 2019, and 2020. At the 2018 and 2019 tournaments, she was selected by the coaches as one of Russia's top three players and was also named to the tournament All-Star Teams. At the 2020 tournament, she captained Russia to a bronze medal finish.

Markova represented the Russian Olympic Committee (ROC) at the 2021 IIHF Women's World Championship and was selected by the coaches as one of the team's top three players. She was named to the ROC roster for the women's ice hockey tournament at the 2022 Winter Olympics but was unable to participate after receiving a positive COVID-19 test result shortly before the team departed for Beijing.

== Career statistics ==
=== Regular season and playoffs ===
			Regular season					Playoffs
Season	Team	League	GP	G	A	Pts	PIM	GP	G	A	Pts	PIM
2017–18	SKIF Nizhny Novgorod	ZhHL	19	1	1	2	2	2	0	1	1	0
2018–19	Agidel Ufa	ZhHL	29	7	9	16	10	6	1	1	2	4
2019–20	Agidel Ufa	ZhHL	28	7	7	14	10	5	0	1	1	0
2020–21	Agidel Ufa	ZhHL	28	12	12	24	12	6	4	1	5	4
2021–22	Agidel Ufa	ZhHL	34	17	18	35	45	3	1	0	1	0
2022–23	Agidel Ufa	ZhHL	32	8	19	27	21	10	5	3	8	6
2023–24	Agidel Ufa	ZhHL	42	14	26	40	8	7	5	5	10	4
ZhHL totals			212	66	92	158	108	39	16	12	28	18

=== International ===
Year	Team	Event	Result	GP	G	A	Pts	PIM
2018	Russia	WC18	4th	6	2	0	2	4
2019	Russia	WC18	4th	6	2	4	6	0
2020	Russia	WC18	3rd place, bronze medalist(s)	6	2	2	4	0
2021	ROC	WC	5th	7	1	0	1	0
Junior totals				18	6	6	12	4
