= Mackie Samoskevich =

American ice hockey player (born 2002)

- Samoskevich with the Seattle Kraken in 2026
- Born: November 15, 2002 (age 23) Sandy Hook, Connecticut, U.S.
- Height: 5 ft 11 in (180 cm)
- Weight: 180 lb (82 kg; 12 st 12 lb)
- Position: Forward
- Shoots: Right
- NHL team Former teams: Seattle Kraken; Florida Panthers
- NHL draft: 24th overall, 2021; Florida Panthers
- Playing career: 2023–present

Matthew "Mackie" Samoskevich (born November 15, 2002) is an American professional ice hockey player who is a forward for the Seattle Kraken of the National Hockey League (NHL). He was drafted 24th overall by the Florida Panthers in the 2021 NHL entry draft. He won the Stanley Cup with the Panthers in 2025.

== Playing career ==
=== Junior ===
During the 2020–21 season, Samoskevich recorded 13 goals and 24 assists in 36 games for the Chicago Steel. During the Clark Cup playoffs, he recorded one goal and nine assists in eight games to help lead his team to the Anderson Cup and Clark Cup.

=== College ===
Samoskevich began his collegiate career for the Michigan Wolverines during the 2021–22 season. During his freshman season, he recorded 26 points on nine goals and 17 assists. Two of his goals were unassisted goals, capitalizing on turnovers, while four goals came on the power play. Following an outstanding season, he was named to the All-Big Ten Freshman Team.

During the 2022–23 season in his sophomore year, Samoskevich ranked second on the team in goals with 19, and third in points with 40 in 35 games. Following the season, he was named to the All-Big Ten Second Team. He finished his collegiate career with 30 goals and 42 assists in 79 games.

=== Professional ===
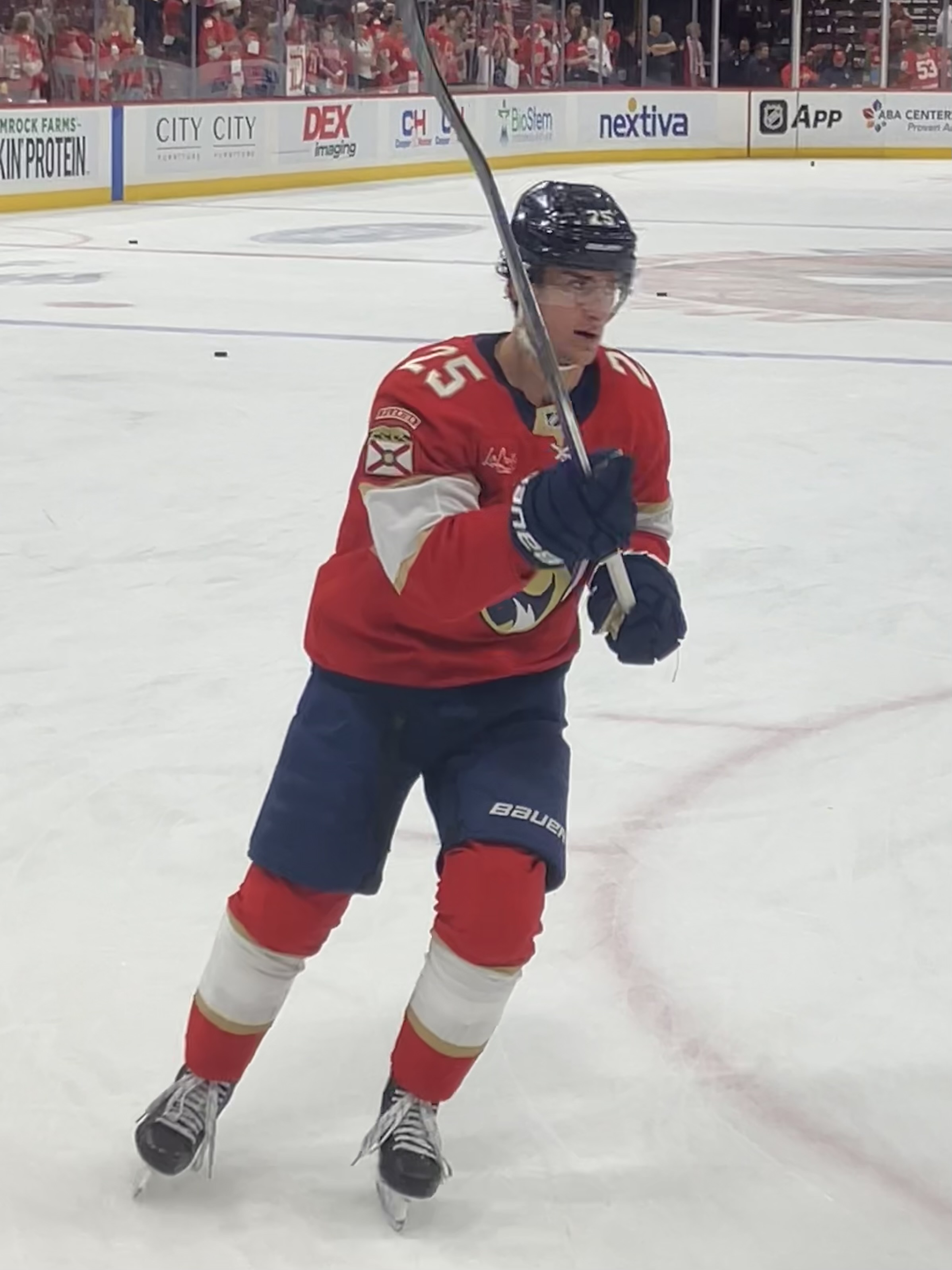
Samoskevich with the Panthers in 2025

On July 23, 2021, Samoskevich was drafted 24th overall by the Florida Panthers in the 2021 NHL entry draft.

On April 11, 2023, Samoskevich signed a professional tryout (PTO) contract with the Panthers' AHL affiliate, the Charlotte Checkers, for the remainder of the 2022–23 AHL season. Following the conclusion of the season with the Checkers, Samoskevich was signed to a three-year, entry-level contract with the Panthers on May 9, 2023.

Following two appearances with the Panthers to start the 2023–24 season, Samoskevich was assigned back to the Checkers.

On October 17, 2024, Samoskevich registered his first point in an NHL game, with an assist in a 3–2 loss to the Vancouver Canucks. On October 26, 2024, Samoskevich scored his first NHL goal, the tying goal in a 6–3 comeback win against the New York Islanders.

On July 10, 2025, Samoskevich signed a one-year extension worth $775,000 with the Florida Panthers.

On June 21, 2026, Samoskevich was traded to the Seattle Kraken in exchange for a 2026 first-round pick and a conditional 2027 second-round pick.

== International play ==
Samoskevich represented the United States at the 2019 Hlinka Gretzky Cup, where he recorded one goal in four games.

== Personal life ==
Samoskevich comes from a hockey-playing family. His twin sister, Maddy, played college hockey for Quinnipiac, and was drafted by PWHL Vancouver (now the Vancouver Goldeneyes) in the 2025 PWHL Draft. His older sister, Melissa is a former professional ice hockey player who last played for the Connecticut Whale of the Premier Hockey Federation.

During his day with the Stanley Cup following the 2025 Stanley Cup playoffs, Samoskevich brought the trophy to the Sandy Hook Memorial in Sandy Hook, Connecticut, in honor of the victims of the 2012 school shooting, as he is a native of the community and had graduated from the school just a few months before the shooting.

== Career statistics ==
=== Regular season and playoffs ===
| | | | Regular season | | | | | Playoffs |
| Season | Team | League | GP | G | A | Pts | PIM | GP | G | A | Pts | PIM |
|---|---|---|---|---|---|---|---|---|---|---|---|---|
| 2018–19 | Chicago Steel | USHL | 2 | 0 | 2 | 2 | 0 | 3 | 0 | 1 | 1 | 0 |
| 2019–20 | Chicago Steel | USHL | 47 | 13 | 21 | 34 | 28 | — | — | — | — | — |
| 2020–21 | Chicago Steel | USHL | 36 | 13 | 24 | 37 | 27 | 8 | 1 | 9 | 10 | 4 |
| 2021–22 | University of Michigan | B1G | 40 | 10 | 19 | 29 | 12 | — | — | — | — | — |
| 2022–23 | University of Michigan | B1G | 39 | 20 | 23 | 43 | 28 | — | — | — | — | — |
| 2022–23 | Charlotte Checkers | AHL | 2 | 0 | 2 | 2 | 0 | 7 | 0 | 4 | 4 | 0 |
| 2023–24 | Florida Panthers | NHL | 7 | 0 | 0 | 0 | 0 | — | — | — | — | — |
| 2023–24 | Charlotte Checkers | AHL | 62 | 22 | 32 | 54 | 24 | 3 | 0 | 0 | 0 | 2 |
| 2024–25 | Florida Panthers | NHL | 72 | 15 | 16 | 31 | 12 | 4 | 0 | 1 | 1 | 4 |
| 2025–26 | Florida Panthers | NHL | 77 | 12 | 20 | 32 | 30 | — | — | — | — | — |
| NHL totals | | | 156 | 27 | 36 | 63 | 42 | 4 | 0 | 1 | 1 | 4 |

=== International ===
| Year | Team | Event | Result | GP | G | A | Pts | PIM |
|---|---|---|---|---|---|---|---|---|
| 2022 | United States | WJC | 5th | 5 | 0 | 3 | 3 | 0 |
| Junior totals | | | | 5 | 0 | 3 | 3 | 0 |

== Awards and honors ==
| Award | Year | Ref |
College
| All-Big Ten Freshman Team | 2022 | |
| Big Ten All-Tournament Team | 2022 | |
| All-Big Ten Second Team | 2023 | |
NHL
| Stanley Cup champion | 2025 | |

Awards and achievements
| Preceded by Anton Lundell | Florida Panthers first-round draft pick 2021 | Succeeded by Incumbent |
