= Stephanie Markowski =

Canadian ice hockey player (born 2001)

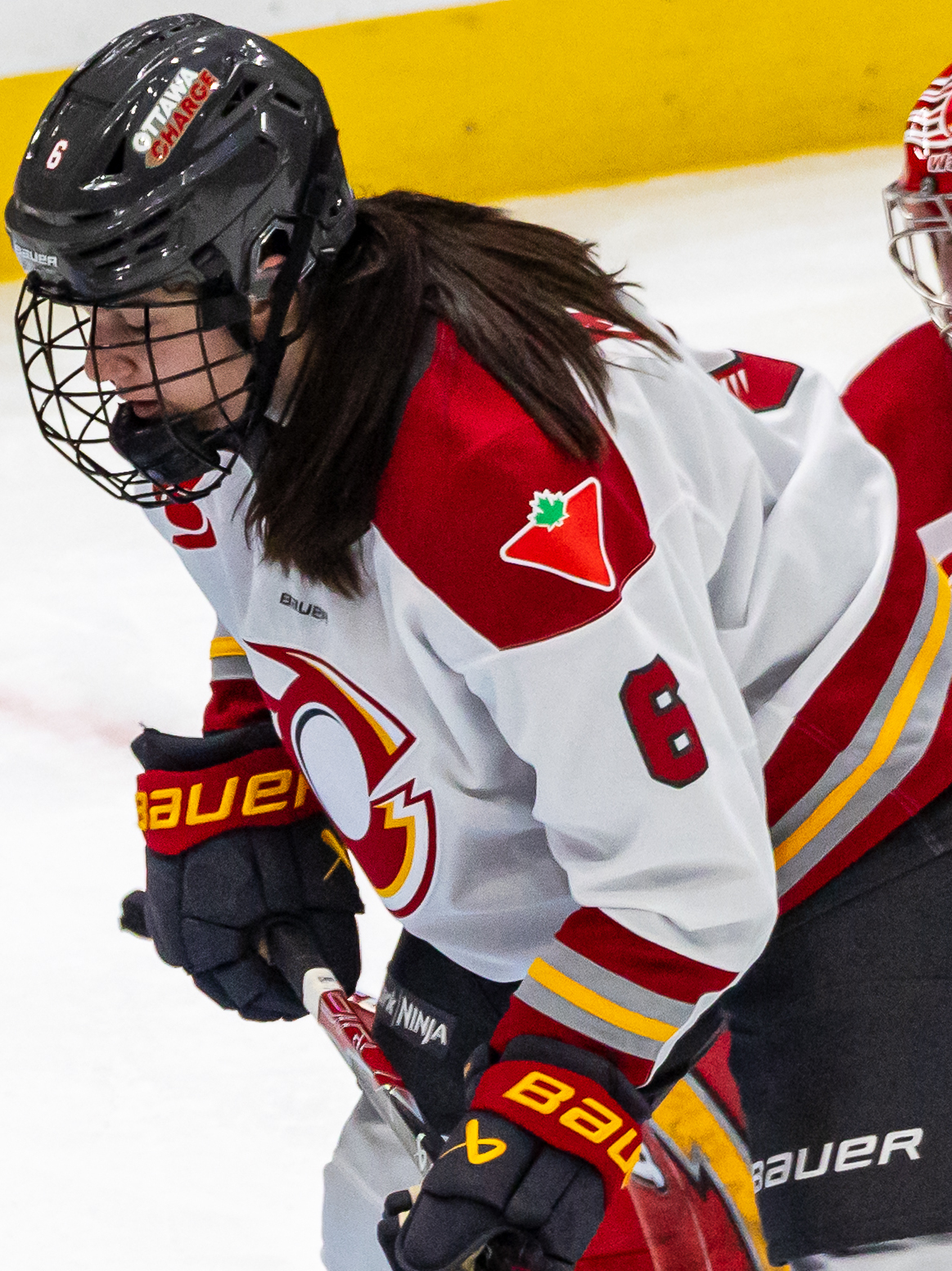
- Markowski with the Ottawa Charge in 2025
- Born: August 24, 2001 (age 25) Edmonton, Alberta, Canada
- Height: 5 ft 8 in (173 cm)
- Position: Defence
- Shoots: Right
- PWHL team Former teams: Detroit Clutch; Ottawa Charge
- Playing career: 2024–present

Stephanie Markowski (born August 24, 2001) is a Canadian professional ice hockey player who is a defender for the Detroit Clutch of the Professional Women's Hockey League (PWHL). She previously played for the Ottawa Charge of the PWHL. played college ice hockey at Clarkson and Ohio State.

== Early life ==
Markowski was born to Carrie and Robert Markowski. She played ice hockey for the Pursuit of Excellence in the Canadian Sport School Hockey League. During the 2019 season, she recorded ten goals and 20 assists in 30 games and won the Top Defenseman award.

== Playing career ==
=== College ===
Markowski began her collegiate hockey career for Clarkson during the 2019–20 season. During her freshman year, she recorded 11 assists in 36 games, and ranked second on the team with 74 blocked shots. During the 2020–21 season in her sophomore year, she recorded two goals and nine assists in 19 games, in a season that was shortened due to the COVID-19 pandemic. During the 2021–22 season in her junior year, she recorded five goals and six assists in 37 games. During the 2022–23 season in her senior year, she recorded nine goals and 23 assists in 42 games, and blocked a team-high 82 shots.

On March 28, 2023, Markowski announced she would transfer to Ohio State for her final year of eligibility. During the 2023–24 season as a graduate student, she recorded three goals and 24 assists in 39 games, and helped lead the Buckeyes to their second NCAA women's ice hockey tournament championship in 2024.

=== Professional ===
On June 10, 2024, Markowski was drafted in the fourth round, 20th overall, by PWHL Ottawa in the 2024 PWHL Draft. In November 2024, during pre-season camps, she scored one goal and two assists in two games. Following her performance during the pre-season, she signed a one-year contract with the Ottawa Charge. During the 2024–25 season, she recorded one goal and four assists in 28 games. On July 11, 2025, she signed a one-year contract extension with the Charge. During the 2025–26 season, she recorded one goal and four assists in 30 games.

On June 21, 2026, she signed a two-year contract with the Detroit Clutch.

== International play ==
Medal record

Representing Canada

Ice hockey

World U18 Championships
Gold medal – first place	2019 Japan	

Markowski represented Canada at the 2019 IIHF World Women's U18 Championship where she served recorded one goal and two assists in four games and won a gold medal.

== Career statistics ==
=== Regular season and playoffs ===
			Regular season					Playoffs
Season	Team	League	GP	G	A	Pts	PIM	GP	G	A	Pts	PIM
2019–20	Clarkson University	ECAC	36	0	11	11	22	—	—	—	—	—
2020–21	Clarkson University	ECAC	19	2	9	11	24	—	—	—	—	—
2021–22	Clarkson University	ECAC	37	5	6	11	30	—	—	—	—	—
2022–23	Clarkson University	ECAC	42	9	23	32	28	—	—	—	—	—
2023–24	Ohio State University	WCHA	39	3	24	27	4	—	—	—	—	—
2024–25	Ottawa Charge	PWHL	28	1	4	5	10	8	0	0	0	2
2025–26	Ottawa Charge	PWHL	30	1	4	5	6	8	0	0	0	0
PWHL totals			58	2	8	10	16	16	0	0	0	2

=== International ===
Year	Team	Event	Result	GP	G	A	Pts	PIM
2019	Canada	U18	1st place, gold medalist(s)	4	1	2	3	0
Junior totals				4	1	2	3	0
