= 2025 PWHL Draft =

3rd PWHL Draft

General information
- Date: June 24, 2025
- Location: Hard Rock Hotel & Casino; Ottawa, Ontario, Canada

Overview
- 48 total selections in 6 rounds
- League: Professional Women's Hockey League
- First selection: (Czech Republic) Kristýna Kaltounková (New York Sirens)

The 2025 PWHL Draft was the third annual draft in Professional Women's Hockey League history, and took place on June 24, 2025, at the Hard Rock Hotel & Casino in Ottawa, Ontario, Canada.

Kristýna Kaltounková was selected first overall by the New York Sirens.

== Eligibility ==
The declaration period for the draft opened on March 1, 2025, and closed on May 8. Undrafted players will become free agents; players must declare for the draft to reach free agency. Selected players may re-enter the draft if they are not signed to their draft club after two years. No player may declare for more than two drafts. Players ineligible to play in the 2025–26 season were not eligible to be selected.

On May 15, 2025, the PWHL released the full list of eligible players. In total, 199 eligible players declared for the draft, of which 117 were forwards, 56 were defenders, and 26 were goaltenders.

== Top prospects ==
=== Top skaters ===
Source: The Hockey News (June 1, 2025) ranking.

Ranking	Player	School/club team
1	Kristýna Kaltounková (C)	Colgate (NCAA)
2	Haley Winn (D)	Clarkson (NCAA)
3	Casey O'Brien (C)	Wisconsin (NCAA)
4	Nicole Gosling (D)	Clarkson (NCAA)
5	Natálie Mlýnková (LW)	Minnesota (NCAA)
6	Rory Guilday (D)	Cornell (NCAA)
7	Michelle Karvinen (LW)	Frölunda HC (SDHL)
8	Anne Cherkowski (C)	Clarkson (NCAA)
9	Kendall Cooper (D)	Quinnipiac (NCAA)
10	Jenna Buglioni (C)	Ohio State (NCAA)

=== Top goaltenders ===
Source: The Hockey News (June 1, 2025) ranking.

Ranking	Player	School/club team
1	Sanni Ahola	St. Cloud State (NCAA)
2	Hannah Murphy	Colgate (NCAA)
3	Ena Nystrøm	Brynäs IF (SDHL)

== Expansion ==
The PWHL established two new teams for the 2025–26 season, the Seattle Torrent and Vancouver Goldeneyes. In order to help these new teams fill their rosters, the league granted them an exclusive signing window from June 4–8, and held an expansion draft on June 9, 2025.

=== Protected lists and exclusive signing window ===
Before 5:00 pm on June 3, each current team submitted the names of three current players under contract for next season to the league to be protected from signing by the expansion teams. After a current team lost two players, they were allowed to protect a fourth player. Once the protected lists were submitted, the Seattle and Vancouver teams had a five-day exclusive window, from June 4 through June 8, to sign up to five players each. Any player who was either unprotected, or on an expiring contract, could be signed by either expansion team.

==== Protected players ====
Boston	Minnesota	Montreal	New York	Ottawa	Toronto
Aerin Frankel	Kendall Coyne Schofield	Ann-Renée Desbiens	Sarah Fillier	Emily Clark	Renata Fast
Megan Keller	Taylor Heise	Marie-Philip Poulin	Ella Shelton	Gwyneth Philips	Blayre Turnbull
Alina Müller	Lee Stecklein	Laura Stacey	Micah Zandee-Hart	Ronja Savolainen	Daryl Watts
Shay Maloney	Britta Curl-Salemme	Erin Ambrose	Maja Nylén Persson	Gabbie Hughes	Emma Maltais

==== Signed players ====
Round	Seattle Torrent		Vancouver Goldeneyes	
Round	Player	Former team	Player	Former team
1	Hilary Knight	Boston Fleet	Claire Thompson	Minnesota Frost
2	Danielle Serdachny	Ottawa Charge	Sophie Jaques	Minnesota Frost
3	Cayla Barnes	Montreal Victoire	Sarah Nurse	Toronto Sceptres
4	Alex Carpenter	New York Sirens	Emerance Maschmeyer	Ottawa Charge
5	Corinne Schroeder	New York Sirens	Jennifer Gardiner	Montreal Victoire

=== Expansion draft ===
On June 9, the two expansion teams drafted at least seven additional players from the current PWHL teams, until they reached a 12-player roster. If one (or both) of the expansion teams signed fewer than five players during the exclusive signing window, they would receive more than seven picks in the expansion draft. On June 6, 2025, the Seattle Torrent announced that they had come to agreement with New York Sirens goaltender Corinne Schroeder, ensuring that both teams picked the minimum number of players (seven) in the expansion draft.

Brooke McQuigge, Gabby Rosenthal, and Anna Wilgren are restricted free agents with their rights controlled by Vancouver or Seattle; they will technically not be members of those teams until they sign a contract in free agency.

Number	Player	Position	PWHL team	Team drafted from
1	Ashton Bell	D	Vancouver Goldeneyes	Ottawa Charge
2	Aneta Tejralová	D	Seattle Torrent	Ottawa Charge
3	Hannah Bilka	F	Seattle Torrent	Boston Fleet
4	Brooke McQuigge	F	Vancouver Goldeneyes	Minnesota Frost
5	Abigail Boreen	F	Vancouver Goldeneyes	Montreal Victoire
6	Jessie Eldridge	F	Seattle Torrent	New York Sirens
7	Julia Gosling	F	Seattle Torrent	Toronto Sceptres
8	Izzy Daniel	F	Vancouver Goldeneyes	Toronto Sceptres
9	Gabby Rosenthal	F	Vancouver Goldeneyes	New York Sirens
10	Anna Wilgren	D	Seattle Torrent	Montreal Victoire
11	Megan Carter	D	Seattle Torrent	Toronto Sceptres
12	Denisa Křížová	F	Vancouver Goldeneyes	Minnesota Frost
13	Sydney Bard	D	Vancouver Goldeneyes	Boston Fleet
14	Emily Brown	D	Seattle Torrent	Boston Fleet

== Format ==
The eight teams will pick in each of six rounds for a total of 48 selections. The top selection in the draft was determined by the Gold Plan, where standings points accumulated by a team that can no longer make the playoffs count as draft order points, and the team with the most draft order points received the first overall selection. On June 13, the PWHL announced the order that all teams would pick for all six rounds of the draft.

== Selections by round ==
=== Round one ===
#	Player	Nationality	PWHL team	School/club team
1	Kristýna Kaltounková (F)	Czech Republic	New York Sirens	Colgate (NCAA)
2	Haley Winn (D)	United States	Boston Fleet	Clarkson (NCAA)
3	Casey O'Brien (F)	United States	New York Sirens (from Toronto) (Note: Toronto → New York. Toronto's first-round pick went to New York as the result of a trade on June 24, 2025, that sent a first-round pick (3rd overall) and a fourth-round pick (27th overall) to New York in exchange for Ella Shelton.)	Wisconsin (NCAA)
4	Nicole Gosling (D)	Canada	Montreal Victoire	Clarkson (NCAA)
5	Rory Guilday (D)	United States	Ottawa Charge	Cornell (NCAA)
6	Kendall Cooper (D)	Canada	Minnesota Frost	Quinnipiac (NCAA)
7	Michelle Karvinen (F)	Finland / Denmark	Vancouver Goldeneyes	Frölunda HC (SDHL)
8	Jenna Buglioni (F)	Canada	Seattle Torrent	Ohio State (NCAA)

=== Round two ===
#	Player	Nationality	PWHL team	School/club team
9	Anne Cherkowski (F)	Canada	New York Sirens	Clarkson (NCAA)
10	Ella Huber (F)	United States	Boston Fleet	Minnesota (NCAA)
11	Emma Gentry (F)	United States	Toronto Sceptres	St. Cloud State (NCAA)
12	Natálie Mlýnková (F)	Czech Republic	Montreal Victoire	Minnesota (NCAA)
13	Anna Shokhina (F)	Russia	Ottawa Charge	Dynamo-Neva St. Petersburg (ZhHL)
14	Abby Hustler (F)	Canada	Minnesota Frost	St. Lawrence (NCAA)
15	Hannah Murphy (G)	Canada	Seattle Torrent	Colgate (NCAA)
16	Kiara Zanon (F)	United States	Toronto Sceptres (from Vancouver Goldeneyes) (Note: Vancouver → Toronto. Vancouver's second-round pick went to Toronto as the result of a trade on June 24, 2025, that sent a second-round pick (16th overall) and a third-round pick (23rd overall) to Toronto in exchange for a third-round pick (19th overall) and Kristen Campbell.)	Ohio State (NCAA)

=== Round three ===
#	Player	Nationality	PWHL team	School/club team
17	Makenna Webster (F)	United States	New York Sirens	Ohio State (NCAA)
18	Olivia Mobley (F)	United States	Boston Fleet	Minnesota Duluth (NCAA)
19	Nina Jobst-Smith (F)	Germany / Canada	Vancouver Goldeneyes (from Toronto)	Minnesota Duluth (NCAA)
20	Skylar Irving (F)	United States	Montreal Victoire	Northeastern (NCAA)
21	Sarah Wozniewicz (F)	Canada	Ottawa Charge	Wisconsin (NCAA)
22	Anna Segedi (F)	United States / China	Minnesota Frost	St. Lawrence (NCAA)
23	Clara Van Wieren (F)	United States	Toronto Sceptres (from Vancouver Goldeneyes)	Minnesota Duluth (NCAA)
24	Lily Delianedis (F)	United States	Seattle Torrent	Cornell (NCAA)

=== Round four ===
#	Player	Nationality	PWHL team	School/club team
25	Dayle Ross (D)	Canada	New York Sirens	St. Cloud State (NCAA)
26	Riley Brengman (D)	United States	Boston Fleet	Ohio State (NCAA)
27	Maddi Wheeler (F)	Canada	New York Sirens (from Toronto)	Ohio State (NCAA)
28	Callie Shanahan (G)	United States	New York Sirens (from Montreal) (Note: Montreal → New York. Montreal's fourth-round pick went to New York as the result of a trade on June 24, 2025, that sent a fourth-round pick (28th overall) and Kristin O'Neill to New York in exchange for Abby Roque.)	Boston University (NCAA)
29	Peyton Hemp (F)	United States	Ottawa Charge	Minnesota (NCAA)
30	Ava Rinker (D)	United States	Minnesota Frost	UConn (NCAA)
31	Jada Habisch (F)	United States	Seattle Torrent	UConn (NCAA)
32	Brianna Brooks (F)	Canada	Vancouver Goldeneyes	Penn State (NCAA)

=== Round five ===
#	Player	Nationality	PWHL team	School/club team
33	Anna Bargman (F)	United States	New York Sirens	Yale (NCAA)
34	Abby Newhook (F)	Canada	Boston Fleet	Boston College (NCAA)
35	Sara Hjalmarsson (F)	Sweden	Toronto Sceptres	Linköping HC (SDHL)
36	Maya Labad (F)	Canada	Montreal Victoire	Quinnipiac (NCAA)
37	Sanni Ahola (G)	Finland	Ottawa Charge	St. Cloud State (NCAA)
38	Vanessa Upson (F)	Canada	Minnesota Frost	Mercyhurst (NCAA)
39	Madison Samoskevich (D)	United States	Vancouver Goldeneyes	Quinnipiac (NCAA)
40	Lyndie Lobdell (D)	United States	Seattle Torrent	Penn State (NCAA)

=== Round six ===
#	Player	Nationality	PWHL team	School/club team
41	Kaley Doyle (G)	United States	New York Sirens	Quinnipiac (NCAA)
42	Amanda Thiele (G)	United States	Boston Fleet	Ohio State (NCAA)
43	Hanna Baskin (D)	United States	Toronto Sceptres	Minnesota Duluth (NCAA)
44	Tamara Giaquinto (D)	Canada	Montreal Victoire	Boston University (NCAA)
45	Fanuza Kadirova (F)	Russia	Ottawa Charge	Dynamo-Neva St. Petersburg (ZhHL)
46	Brooke Becker (D)	United States	Minnesota Frost	Providence (NCAA)
47	Olivia Wallin (F)	Canada	Seattle Torrent	Minnesota Duluth (NCAA)
48	Chanreet Bassi (F)	Canada	Vancouver Goldeneyes	UBC (U Sports)
