= Rei Halloran =

Japanese-American ice hockey player (born 2001)

Rei Halloran ハロラン 麗
- Born: March 22, 2001 (age 24) Tokyo, Japan
- Height: 5 ft 7 in (170 cm)
- Weight: 150 lb (68 kg; 10 st 10 lb)
- Position: Goaltender
- Catches: Left
- National team: Japan
- Playing career: 2019–present

Rei Halloran (ハロラン麗, Haroran Rei; born March 22, 2001) is a Japanese-American ice hockey goaltender who represents the Japan women's national ice hockey team. She competed at the 2026 Winter Olympics in Milano–Cortina, making her Olympic debut during the women's ice hockey tournament and completing her appearance without conceding a goal.

She has played collegiate ice hockey in the United States and professionally in Europe.

== Early life ==
Halloran was born on March 22, 2001, in Tokyo, Japan. She spent the first twelve years of her life in Tokyo, Japan, and was raised in a bilingual household with a Japanese mother and an American father.

Due to limited opportunities for girls’ ice hockey in Japan at the time, she later moved to New England to pursue academic and athletic development.

She attended Buckingham Browne & Nichols School in Cambridge, Massachusetts, where she developed as a goaltender before entering college hockey.

== Playing career ==
=== College ===
Halloran played NCAA Division III women's ice hockey at Wesleyan University. Over her collegiate career, she appeared in 66 games, recorded 1,754 saves, and posted a .924 save percentage with a 2.20 goals-against average.

=== Professional ===
After completing her collegiate career, Halloran continued playing professionally in Europe. During the 2025–26 season, she joined Järnbrotts HK in Sweden, as listed on Japan's official roster for the 2026 Winter Olympics.

== International play ==
=== 2026 Winter Olympics ===
Halloran was selected as one of Japan's goaltenders for the 2026 Winter Olympics. She made her Olympic debut during Japan's final group-stage match against Sweden, entering the game late and completing her appearance without allowing a goal.

Following Japan's elimination from the tournament, Halloran and her teammates cited the physicality of international competition as an area for continued development.

== Career statistics ==
=== Regular season ===
Season	Team	League	GP	W	L	T/OT	GAA	SV%	GA	SO
2021–22	Wesleyan University	NCAA Division III	21	8	12	1	1.91	.931	41	3
2022–23	Wesleyan University	NCAA Division III	24	9	14	1	2.58	.908	60	0
2023–24	Wesleyan University	NCAA Division III	21	8	10	3	2.15	.930	44	0
2024–25	Vålerenga	Bambusa-ligaen	19	7	7	0	2.08	.919	33	3
2025–26	Järnbrotts HK	NDHL	—	—	—	—	—	—	—	—

=== International ===
Note: GP = Games played; Min, TOI = Minutes played; W = Wins; L = Losses; T,T/OT = Ties; OTL = Overtime losses; GA = Goals-against; GAA = Goals-against average; SO = Shutouts; SV% = Save percentage;

				Regular season
Year	Team	Event	Result	GP	W	L	T/OT	MIN	GA	SO	GAA	SV%
2019	Japan U18	U18 WC	8th	2	0	1	0	50:52	4	0	4.72	0.600
2026	Japan	OG	9th	1	0	1	0	13:18	0	0	0.00	1.000

== Personal life ==
Halloran has spoken in interviews about embracing an “underdog” role with the Japanese national team and balancing her Japanese and American cultural background while competing internationally.
