= Kristýna Kaltounková =

Olympian & Czech ice hockey player (born 2002)

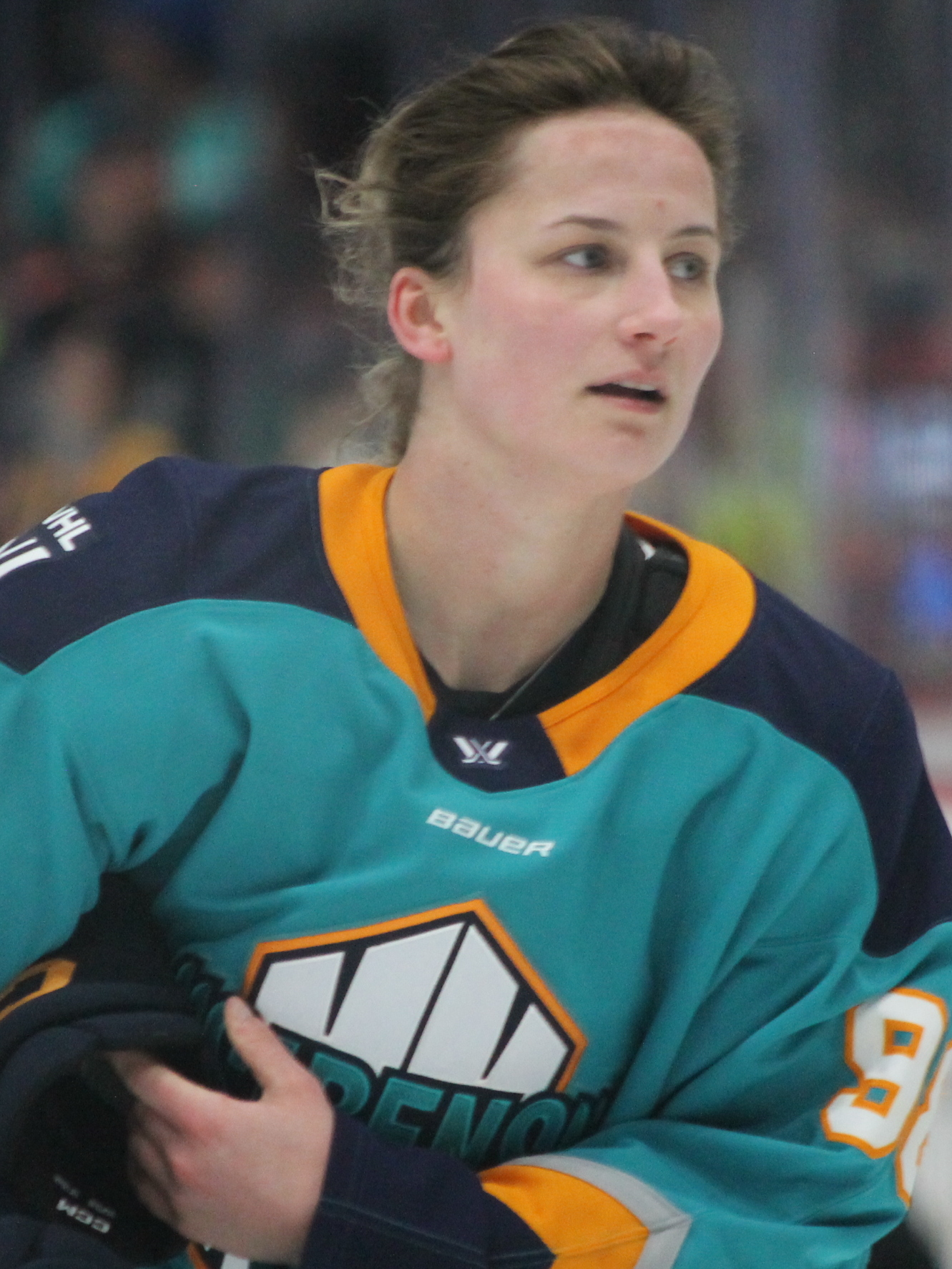
- Kaltounková with the New York Sirens in 2026
- Born: 14 April 2002 (age 24) Vlašim, Czech Republic
- Height: 5 ft 9 in (175 cm)
- Weight: 165 lb (75 kg; 11 st 11 lb)
- Position: Forward
- Shoots: Left
- PWHL team: New York Sirens
- National team: Czech Republic
- Playing career: 2020–present
Medal record
Women's ball hockey
World Championship
Silver medal – second place	2022 Canada

Kristýna Kaltounková (born 14 April 2002) is a Czech professional ice hockey player for the New York Sirens of the Professional Women's Hockey League, a Winter Olympian and a member of the Czech Republic women's national ice hockey team. She was drafted first overall by the Sirens in the 2025 PWHL Draft. She played college ice hockey at Colgate University.

== Playing career ==
=== College ===
Kaltounková began her collegiate career for Colgate during the 2020–21 season. During her freshman year, she recorded 28 goals and 12 assists in 21 games, and was named to the ECAC Hockey All-Rookie Team. During the 2021–22 season, in her sophomore year, she recorded 28 goals and 25 assists in 38 games. On March 5, 2022, during the 2022 ECAC Championship game against Yale, she scored the game-winning overtime goal to help Colgate earn the conference's automatic bid to the 2022 NCAA Division I women's ice hockey tournament. She was subsequently named the ECAC Hockey Tournament MVP.

During the 2022–23 season, in her junior year, she recorded 24 goals and 33 assists in 39 games. During the 2023–24 season, in her senior year, she recorded 27 goals and 30 assists in 36 games. On 13 January 2024, in a game against Cornell, she scored two goals to become Colgate's all-time leading goal scorer, surpassing the previous record of 77 goals held by Heather Murphy.

During the 2024–25 season, as a graduate student, she recorded 26 goals and 22 assists in 37 games. On 1 November 2024, in a game against RPI, she recorded her 200th career point, becoming the second player in program history to reach the milestone, following Danielle Serdachny. On 23 November 2024, in a game against Quinnipiac, she scored two goals and became the first player in program history to reach 100 career goals. Following the season she was named to the All-ECAC first team, and a CCM/AHCA First-Team All-American. She was also named a top-ten finalist for the Patty Kazmaier Award, becoming the first nominee ever from Czechia. She finished her collegiate career with program records for most goals (111), game-winning goals (19) and power-play goals (37), and ranks second in points (233).

=== Professional ===
On 24 June 2025, Kaltounková was drafted first overall by the New York Sirens in the 2025 PWHL Draft. On 8 September 2025, she signed a three-year contract with the Sirens.

== International play ==
Kaltounková represented the Czech Republic at the IIHF U18 Women's World Championship in 2017, 2018, 2019 and 2020, where she recorded 19 points in 20 games. Her 19 points are the most by a Czech player at the U18 World Championship.

On 31 March 2025, she was selected to represent Czechia at the 2025 IIHF Women's World Championship where she made her senior national team debut. She tied for the team lead in scoring, and recorded four goals and two assists in seven games. She was subsequently named to the All-Star team.

== Career statistics ==
=== Regular season and playoffs ===
			Regular season					Playoffs
Season	Team	League	GP	G	A	Pts	PIM	GP	G	A	Pts	PIM
2020–21	Colgate University	ECAC	21	6	12	18	16	—	—	—	—	—
2021–22	Colgate University	ECAC	38	28	25	53	44	—	—	—	—	—
2022–23	Colgate University	ECAC	39	24	33	57	61	—	—	—	—	—
2023–24	Colgate University	ECAC	36	27	30	57	40	—	—	—	—	—
2024–25	Colgate University	ECAC	37	26	22	48	57	—	—	—	—	—
2025–26	New York Sirens	PWHL	21	11	1	12	45	—	—	—	—	—
PWHL totals			21	11	1	12	45	—	—	—	—	—

=== International ===
Year	Team	Event	Result	GP	G	A	Pts	PIM
2017	Czech Republic	U18	6th	5	2	0	2	29
2018	Czech Republic	U18	6th	5	3	4	7	10
2019	Czech Republic	U18	7th	6	0	6	6	8
2020	Czech Republic	U18	6th	4	2	2	4	4
2025	Czechia	WC	4th	7	4	2	6	10
2026	Czechia	OG	5th	5	1	1	2	8
Junior totals				20	7	12	19	51
Senior totals				12	5	3	8	18

== Awards and honors ==
Honors	Year	Ref
PWHL
All-Rookie Team	2026	
International
IIHF World Women's Championship Media All-Star Team	2025	

Awards and achievements
Preceded by Sarah Fillier	PWHL first overall draft pick 2025	Succeeded by Caroline Harvey
