= Anna Savonina =

Russian ice hockey player

Anna Savonina Анна Савонина
- Born: 5 December 2001 (age 23) Elektrostal, Russia
- Height: 1.65 m (5 ft 5 in)
- Weight: 70 kg (154 lb; 11 st 0 lb)
- Position: Defence
- Shoots: Left
- ZhHL team: Tornado Moscow Region
- National team: Russia
- Playing career: 2018–present

Anna Alexandrovna Savonina (Russian: Анна Александровна Савонина; born 5 December 2001) is a Russian ice hockey player and member of the Russian national ice hockey team, currently playing in the Zhenskaya Hockey League (ZhHL) with Tornado Moscow Region.

Savonina represented Russia at the 2019 IIHF Women's World Championship and represented the Russian Olympic Committee at the 2021 IIHF Women's World Championship.
