= Julie Pejšová =

Czech ice hockey player (born 2003)

- Born: 3 February 2003 (age 23) Písek, Czech Republic
- Height: 1.72 m (5 ft 8 in)
- Weight: 91 kg (201 lb; 14 st 5 lb)
- Position: Goaltender
- Catches: Right
- Extraliga team: HC Baník Příbram
- National team: Czech Republic
- Playing career: 2014–present

Julie Pejšová (born 3 February 2003) is a Czech ice hockey player, a goaltender. She plays in the Czech Women's Extraliga with HC Baník Příbram and with the under-17 and under-20 teams of HC Milevsko 1934 in the Regionální liga dorostu and Regionální liga juniorů, respectively. As a member of the Czech national team, she participated in the women's ice hockey tournament at the 2026 Winter Olympics.

== Playing career ==
=== International ===
At the 2025 Winter World University Games, Pejšová won a gold medal with the Czech Republic, their first in the women's ice hockey competition. Competing against Canada in the gold medal game, she was the starting goaltender in a 2–1 overtime triumph. Of note, Pejšová recorded 51 saves in the final versus Canada.

At the 2026 Winter Olympics, Pejšová got the start in Czech Republic's match versus Canada. She was pulled from the game after giving up three goals on 12 shots.
