= Chanreet Bassi =

Canadian ice hockey player (born 2001)

- Born: November 27, 2001 (age 24) Kelowna, British Columbia, Canada
- Height: 5 ft 7 in (170 cm)
- Position: Forward
- Shoots: Right
- SDHL team: Linköping HC
- Playing career: 2025–present

Chanreet Bassi (born November 27, 2001) is a Canadian professional ice hockey forward playing for Linköping HC of the Swedish Women's Hockey League (SDHL). She played five seasons of U Sports hockey with the UBC Thunderbirds, graduating as a four-time Canada West All-Star and tying the program record for regular-season points. Bassi was selected by Vancouver in the sixth round, 48th overall, of the 2025 PWHL Draft, becoming the first UBC player—and the first South Asian player—ever drafted into the PWHL.

== Early life ==
Bassi grew up in Lake Country, British Columbia, and attended George Elliot Secondary. Before UBC, she played for the Pursuit of Excellence (RINK Hockey Academy) and with Team BC at the under-18 level. She was born in nearby Kelowna, British Columbia.

== Playing career ==
=== University ===
Bassi skated for the UBC Thunderbirds from 2020–21 through 2024–25. She finished her university career with 134 points (51 goals, 83 assists) in 166 games in all competitions, and her 116 Canada West regular-season points are tied for the most in program history. She was top-three in Canada West scoring in each of her last four seasons, leading the conference in 2021–22.

=== Professional ===
On June 24, 2025, Bassi was drafted by the Vancouver Goldeneyes in the sixth round, 48th overall, at the 2025 PWHL Draft. She played in two exhibition games with the Goldeneyes before being released after training camp. On December 9, 2025, she signed with Linköping HC in the SDHL.

== Career statistics ==
=== Regular season ===
Season	Team	League	GP	G	A	Pts
2021–22	UBC Thunderbirds	Canada West	19	7	15	22
2022–23	UBC Thunderbirds	Canada West	26	8	20	28
2023–24	UBC Thunderbirds	Canada West	28	12	16	28
2024–25	UBC Thunderbirds	Canada West	28	12	20	32
Canada West totals			101	39	71	110

Season lines from Canada West statistics portals.

== Awards and honours ==
Honour	Year	Ref
College
Canada West First-Team All-Star	2022–23	
Canada West First-Team All-Star	2023–24	
Canada West First-Team All-Star	2024–25	
Canada West Second-Team All-Star	2021–22	
