= Taylor Fox =

American ice hockey player (born 2000)

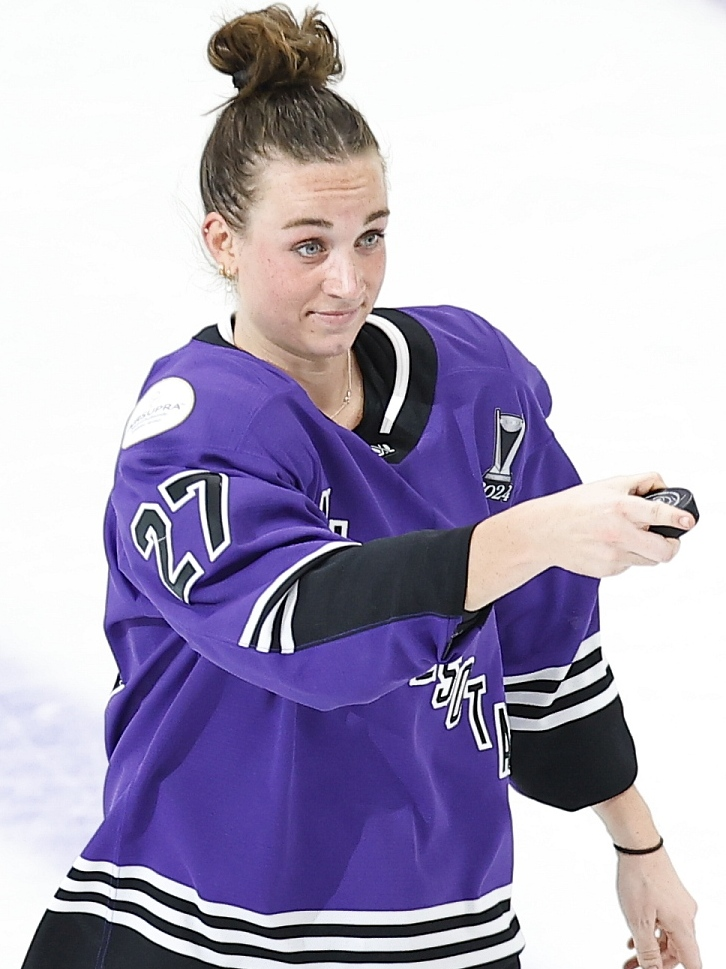
- Fox with Minnesota Frost in 2024
- Born: March 17, 2000 (age 26) Lake City, Minnesota, U.S.
- Height: 5 ft 10 in (178 cm)
- Weight: 168 lb (76 kg; 12 st 0 lb)
- Position: Forward
- Shoots: Right
- PWHL team: Minnesota Frost
- National team: United States
- Playing career: 2017–present
Medal record
Olympic Games
Gold medal – first place	2026 Milano Cortina	Team
World Championships
Gold medal – first place	2023 Canada
Gold medal – first place	2025 Czechia
Gold medal – first place	2026 Denmark
Silver medal – second place	2022 Denmark
Silver medal – second place	2024 United States
World U18 Championship
Gold medal – first place	2016 Canada
Gold medal – first place	2017 Czech Republic
Gold medal – first place	2018 Russia

Taylor Anne Fox (née Heise; /ˈhaɪziː/ HY-zee; born March 17, 2000) is an American professional ice hockey player who is a forward for the Minnesota Frost of the Professional Women's Hockey League (PWHL). A member of the United States women's national ice hockey team, she has won six IIHF medals—three consecutive U18 World Championship gold medals (2016–2018) and three Women's World Championship gold medals (2023, 2025, 2026). She was named Tournament MVP at both the 2018 U18 World Championship and the 2022 IIHF Women's World Championship, where she led the tournament with 18 points, the most by any player in nearly 30 years.

Fox played college ice hockey at the University of Minnesota, where she won the Patty Kazmaier Award in 2022 as the nation's top player. During her five-year collegiate career (2018–2023), she recorded 227 points on 97 goals and 130 assists in 175 games, setting a program record for most games played. She was a two-time CCM/AHCA First-Team All-American and two-time WCHA Forward of the Year (2022, 2023), leading the NCAA Division I in scoring as a senior with 66 points and in goals as a graduate student with 29.

Fox was selected first overall by PWHL Minnesota in the 2023 PWHL Draft. She helped lead the franchise to back-to-back Walter Cup championships in 2024 and 2025, becoming the first player in PWHL history to win consecutive titles with the same team. She was awarded the Ilana Kloss Playoff Most Valuable Player in 2024 after leading the playoffs with eight points in ten games.

Born in Lake City, Minnesota, Fox grew up in a basketball family but began playing hockey in first grade. She attended Red Wing High School, where she was a six-year varsity player. As a senior in 2018, she recorded 74 goals and 30 assists in 29 games, earning the Minnesota Ms. Hockey Award and USA Today High School Sports All-USA Girls Hockey Player of the Year honors.

== Early life ==
Born in Lake City, Minnesota, a small town along the Mississippi River in southeastern Minnesota, Heise grew up on a dairy farm outside Lake City with her parents, Amy and Tony Heise, both of whom were former college basketball players at the University of Wisconsin–River Falls. Heise has two younger brothers, Nathan and Ryan, who followed their parents' footsteps into college basketball.

As a first-grader, Heise brought home a flyer from school about an introductory hockey lesson and expressed interest in trying the sport—unexpected news for a family centered on basketball. "It was a tough few nights, because we live in Timbuktu, where there is no hockey," her father Tony recalled. "We knew if we started hockey, it would be a long road." Lake City did not have a hockey program, with organized hockey limited to one day per week on an outdoor rink. Heise began skating on the outdoor rink in Lake City, where practices depended on weather conditions and whether someone had shoveled the ice. She played there for approximately three years, competing only against neighboring Wabasha, before transitioning to Red Wing for youth hockey. The family's commitment to Heise's hockey career required significant sacrifices. Daily trips to Red Wing (roughly 30 minutes each way) were necessary for youth hockey, and she traveled to and from the Twin Cities four days per week during the off-season—a one-to-two-hour drive each way depending on traffic. Despite being a talented basketball player herself, Heise ended her basketball career after sixth grade. "I loved basketball, but at the end of the day, hockey is more freeing to me," Heise said. "I'm more independent, so I felt like I'd be able to learn this and do it on my own." In fourth grade, Heise informed her parents that she would open enroll at Red Wing High School beginning in seventh grade to play hockey, as Lake City High School did not have a hockey program. The decision was emotional for the self-described "homebody." "I will never forget it. Like I cried a few times about it," Heise recalled. "Every time I'd go to USA Hockey camps I'd cry in the car." Her grandfather Ken Heise, who lived a mile from Red Wing High School and had recently retired from being a bus driver, drove her to and from school before she obtained her driver's license.

Heise joined Red Wing's varsity team as a seventh-grader in the 2012–13 season, recording five goals and nine points on a team led by future Division I players including Nicole Schammel, Paige Haley, and Reagan Haley. The Wingers won three consecutive section championships during Heise's first three seasons (2013, 2014, 2015), and placed third at the Minnesota State Class A Tournament three consecutive years—as a seventh-grader in 2012–13, eighth-grader in 2013–14, and freshman in 2014–15. Heise served as team captain during her junior and senior seasons. By her junior year in 2016–17, Heise had recorded 142 goals and 128 assists in her high school career. At Red Wing High School, Heise was a four-time USA Today American Family Insurance All-USA honoree. As a senior in 2018, she recorded 74 goals and 30 assists for 104 points in 29 games, leading Red Wing to a consolation runner-up finish at the state tournament. She recorded nine points (7G-2A) in three state tournament games and was named to the 2018 Minnesota State Class A All-Tournament Team. Following an outstanding season, she was named the 2018 USA Today High School Sports All-USA Girls Hockey Player of the Year and won the Minnesota Ms. Hockey Award.

Heise finished her six-year high school career with 216 goals and 370 points, while maintaining a 3.96 grade point average. In December 2023, Red Wing honored Heise by unveiling a banner featuring her name and number 9, which hangs alongside that of Alyssa Johnson, a pioneer in Red Wing girls hockey. Heise was also a three-sport athlete, earning six letters in hockey, two in track and field, and one in soccer.

== Playing career ==
=== College ===
Heise began her collegiate career for the Minnesota Golden Gophers during the 2018–19 season. During her freshman year, she recorded 13 goals and 22 assists in 39 games. She led the team with 147 shots on goal, and second on the team with four multi-goal games. She also ranked tied for second in the WCHA and ninth in the nation with a team-best five game-winning goals. She led WCHA rookies with 22 assists, and ranked third among WCHA rookies and sixth among NCAA rookies with 0.90 points per game. Following the season she was named to the WCHA All-Rookie team.

During the 2019–20 season in her sophomore year, she recorded 18 goals and 25 assists in 36 games. She ranked third on the team with a career-high 43 points, ranked second on the team with 25 assists, and ranked second on the team and sixth in the WCHA with 168 shots on goal. Following the season she was named to the All-WCHA Third Team. During the 2020–21 season in her junior year, she recorded seven goals and nine assists in a season that was shortened due to the COVID-19 pandemic. She ranked second on the team with 74 shots on goal, and third on the team with 16 points.

During the 2021–22 season in her senior year, she led the NCAA in scoring with 66 points on 29 goals and 37 assists in 39 games. She recorded five shorthanded goals, the most in the nation, and third most in a single season in program history. She became the first player in program history to surpass 60 points in a season since Dani Cameranesi. She was named the WCHA Forward of the Month and the HCA National Player of the Month for the month of November. She recorded eight goals and eight assists. She recorded a multi-point game in five of six contests in the month. She scored her second career hat trick on November 12, 2021, in a game against RIT. She was named the WCHA Forward of the Month and HCA Co-National Player of the Month for the month of March. She recorded eight goals and 10 assists in eight games during the month, including five multi-point and two multi-goal games. She became the first Gopher to win the award three times in a single season since its inception in 2016–17. Following an outstanding season, she was named first-team All-WCHA, WCHA Offensive Player of the Year and WCHA Player of the Year. She was also named CCM/AHCA First-Team All-American and won the Patty Kazmaier Award. She led the NCAA in both total points (66) and points per game (1.69), and ranked second in goals (29) and sixth in assists (37).

During the 2022–23 season in her graduate student year, she led the NCAA in goals with 29, and ranked second in points with 65 in 37 games. During the regular season she led the conference in scoring with 19 goals and 51 points in 28 games. She was named HCA National Player of the Month in December and WCHA Forward of the Month in February. Following an outstanding season, she was named first-team All-WCHA and WCHA Forward of the Year for the second consecutive year. She was also named CCM/AHCA First-Team All-American.

=== Professional ===
==== Minnesota Frost (2023–present) ====
External videos
- Taylor Heise becomes the FIRST overall draft pick in the FIRST PWHL draft, ESPN

On September 18, 2023, Heise was drafted first overall by PWHL Minnesota in the 2023 PWHL Draft, with her name called by tennis legend Billie Jean King, a member of the league's board of directors. On October 26, 2023, she signed a three-year contract with Minnesota. On January 3, 2024, in Minnesota's inaugural game against PWHL Boston in Lowell, Massachusetts, Heise scored the first goal in franchise history unassisted in a 3–2 victory. One week later, on January 10, Heise had a breakout performance with two highlight-reel goals and an assist in a 3–1 win over PWHL Toronto, giving her three goals in her first three professional games. Her first goal came late in the opening period when she rushed the puck down the wing and beat two Toronto defenders before tucking the puck past goaltender Kristen Campbell. The game-winner came on a breakaway in the second period when she deked and fired a shot over Campbell's shoulder. Heise's regular season was affected by injury, and she missed five games. During the 2023–24 season, she recorded four goals and nine assists in 19 regular season games, finishing fourth on Minnesota and fifth among rookies in scoring. Minnesota clinched the final playoff spot on the last day of the regular season after losing five consecutive games to end their campaign.

In the Walter Cup playoffs, Heise elevated her game significantly. In the semifinal series against top-seeded Toronto, she scored the game-winning goal on the power play at 8:30 of the third period in Game 5, firing a wrist shot from the top of the left circle over Campbell's glove to give Minnesota a 2–1 lead and clinch a spot in the Finals. The goal was Minnesota's second power play marker of the game after they had been 0-for-12 on the power play in the series prior to Game 5. Heise won 68.8% of her faceoffs in the series, the highest percentage among all players. In the Finals against Boston, Minnesota won the decisive Game 5 on the road with a 3–0 victory to capture the inaugural Walter Cup championship. Heise led the playoffs in goals with five and tied for the postseason lead with eight points in ten games played, earning her the Ilana Kloss Playoff MVP award.

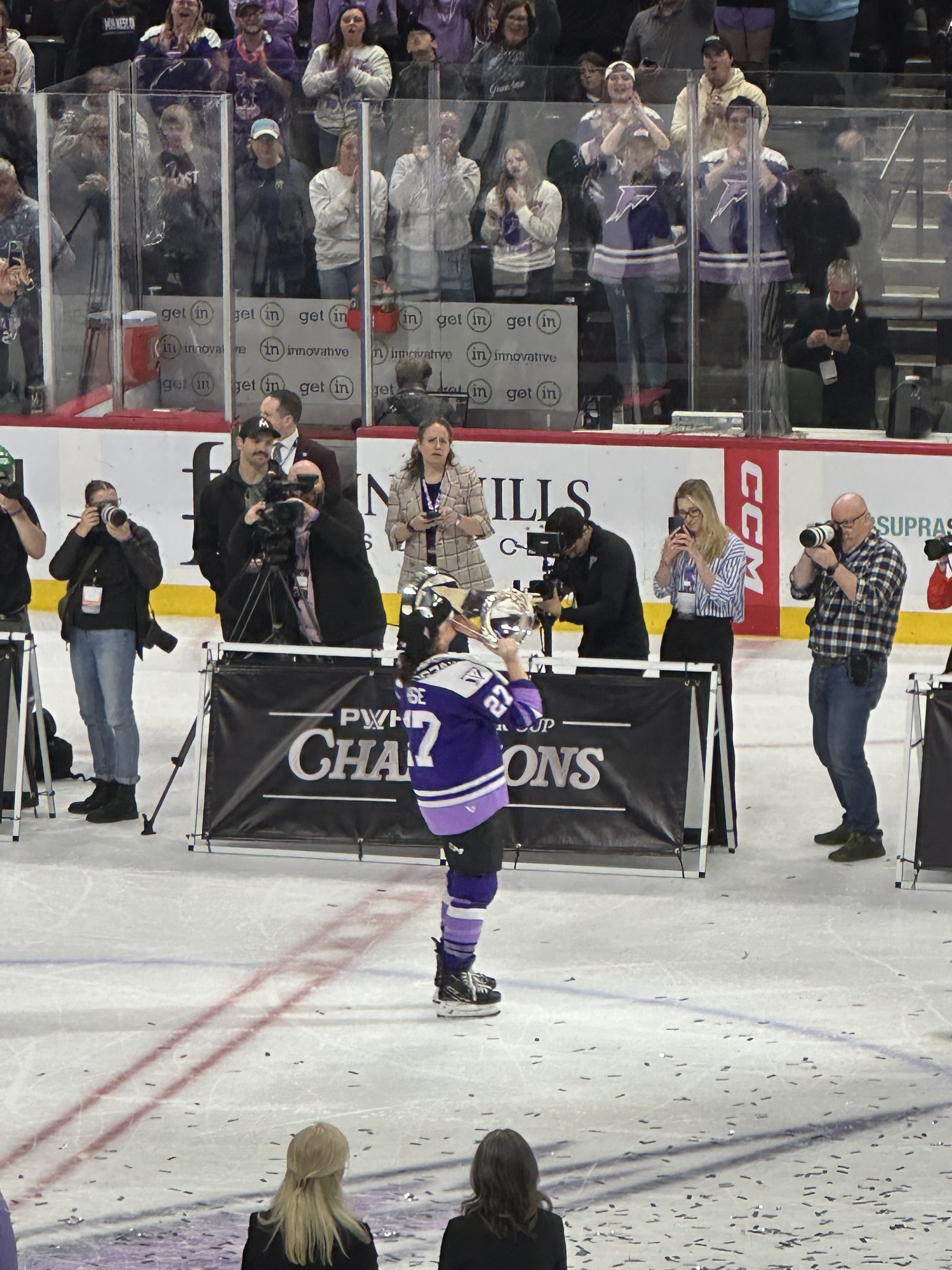
Heise kisses the Walter Cup in 2025 after winning with the Minnesota Frost.

Heise entered the 2024–25 PWHL season dealing with a knee injury sustained while practicing for Team USA before the season. The injury limited her ice time early in the season, as she sat seventh among Frost forwards in ice time through the first four games. As her knee healed, her playing time increased significantly—she played a season-high 33 minutes against New York, followed by 18 minutes against Montreal. Despite the injury challenges, Heise demonstrated her playmaking abilities with eight assists through the first six games, ranking second in the league. After meeting with head coach Ken Klee and teammates who encouraged her to shoot more, Heise responded with a two-goal performance against Boston on January 26, 2025, helping Minnesota win 5–2 and end a three-game losing streak. Her first goal came 11 minutes into the game when she sniped in a pass from Michela Cava, and her second came less than two minutes after Hilary Knight's goal for Boston, pushing Minnesota back to a 3–1 lead.

In the 2025 playoffs, Heise scored her first goal of the postseason in dramatic fashion, netting the overtime winner in Game 4 against Toronto on May 14, 2025, to clinch Minnesota's spot in the Walter Cup Finals with a 4–3 victory. The goal came with four minutes remaining in overtime when she took a pass from Grace Zumwinkle and fired a shot with Brooke McQuigge screening the goaltender. Heise celebrated by throwing her arms in the air, pounding the glass, then dropping to her knees and coasting toward center ice as her teammates poured off the bench. Minnesota went on to defeat Boston in the Finals to win their second consecutive Walter Cup championship, making them the first back-to-back champions in PWHL history.

Entering her third professional season, Heise and the Frost began their pursuit of a third consecutive Walter Cup championship on November 21, 2025. The Frost returned nine players from back-to-back championship teams, including Kendall Coyne Schofield, Kelly Pannek, Lee Stecklein, Grace Zumwinkle, and goaltenders Nicole Hensley and Maddie Rooney. However, the team faced significant roster changes with the departure of key players including Sophie Jaques, Claire Thompson, and Michela Cava to the expansion Vancouver Goldeneyes. Heise struggled to find the back of the net early in the season, going scoreless in her first six games despite recording multiple assists. She broke through with a two-goal performance against the Boston Fleet on January 26, 2025, in a 5–2 victory that ended Minnesota's three-game losing streak. Through the first half of the season, Heise demonstrated her playmaking ability with eight assists, ranking second in the league, though she admitted her tendency to pass rather than shoot had limited her goal production. On December 27, 2025, Heise scored her first goal of the season—an overtime winner against the Vancouver Goldeneyes at Rogers Place in Edmonton during the PWHL Takeover Tour. Heise circled the offensive zone before firing a shot just under the crossbar at 2:57 of overtime, giving the Frost a 2–1 victory before a crowd of 10,264. The goal was her first overtime winner since Game 4 of the 2025 PWHL Playoffs against Toronto.

== International play ==
=== Junior ===
Heise represented the United States at the 2016 IIHF U18 Women's World Championship, where she recorded two goals and one assist in five games and won a gold medal. She represented the United States at the 2017 IIHF U18 Women's World Championship, where she recorded one assist in five games and won her second consecutive gold medal.

Heise was named captain for the United States at the 2018 IIHF U18 Women's World Championship and recorded four goals and four assists for eight points in five games, leading Team USA to a third consecutive gold medal. Following the tournament, she was named the Best Forward, Tournament MVP, and selected to the All-Star Team. Heise's three U18 gold medals made her one of the most decorated players in the history of the U.S. U18 program.

=== Senior ===
On August 14, 2022, Heise was named to the roster for the United States national team at the 2022 IIHF Women's World Championship in Herning, Denmark, marking her senior national team debut. In her tournament debut against Japan, Heise recorded five assists, announcing her arrival as one of the world's elite players. She scored her first senior international hat trick in a quarterfinal match against Hungary, leading the United States to a 12–1 victory. Heise led the tournament in scoring with seven goals and 11 assists for 18 points in seven games—the most points by any player in a Women's World Championship in nearly 30 years—as Team USA won a silver medal after losing 2–1 to Canada in the gold medal game. She was subsequently named the Best Forward, Tournament MVP, and selected to the All-Star Team, while also leading the tournament in goals, assists, and points.

At the 2023 IIHF Women's World Championship in Brampton, Ontario, Canada, Heise won her first senior gold medal as the United States defeated rival Canada 6–3 in the gold medal game. She tied for third in tournament scoring with 12 points (one goal, 11 assists), including an assist on Hilary Knight's game-winning goal in the championship game.

Heise returned to the 2024 IIHF Women's World Championship in Utica, New York, as one of 18 returning players from the 2023 gold medal team. She recorded seven points in seven games, but Team USA fell short in the gold medal game, losing 3–2 to Canada to earn a silver medal.

At the 2025 IIHF Women's World Championship in České Budějovice, Czechia, Heise scored a crucial power play goal early in the third period to give the United States a 3–2 lead in the gold medal game against Canada. Although Canada tied the game with five minutes remaining in regulation, Heise set up the overtime winner by intercepting a Canadian pass just inside the offensive blue line and delivering a perfect cross-ice pass to Tessa Janecke at the top of the crease for a backdoor tap-in 17 minutes into overtime, securing a 4–3 victory and Team USA's second consecutive gold medal. Heise finished the tournament with two goals and five points.

Through five senior World Championships (2022–2025), Heise has compiled a record of 2–2 in gold medal games, winning gold in 2023 and 2025, and silver in 2022 and 2024. She has earned three Women's World Championship medals (two gold, one silver) at the senior level to go along with her three U18 gold medals.

On January 2, 2026, she was named to team USA's roster to compete at the 2026 Winter Olympics. In the gold medal game of the 2026 Olympic Games, versus Canada, Heise logged the assist on the game winning goal, a pass that covered 3/4ths the length of the ice as it started under the American goal line and ended near the Canadian blue line.

== Personal life ==
On June 28, 2025, Heise became engaged to Parker Fox, a former Minnesota men's basketball player. The couple were married on August 22, 2026. Fox, who played seven seasons of college basketball including six at Minnesota, attended Game 5 of the 2024 PWHL Finals in Boston to watch Heise and the Frost win the inaugural Walter Cup championship. Heise maintains strong connections to her basketball roots despite her hockey career. Her two younger brothers both play college basketball—Nathan at Iowa State (after four seasons at Northern Iowa) and Ryan at Winona State. She regularly attends their games and maintains her own basketball skills, with Fox crediting her with "really good shooting form" and range.

Heise is active in youth hockey development and community engagement in Minnesota. She runs the "Taylor Heise 27" hockey camp, holding sessions at venues including Ridder Arena in Minneapolis. She has also served as an instructor at camps run by Hockey4all, including the Hilary Knight camp in Blaine, Minnesota. Heise frequently returns to southeastern Minnesota to work with youth and high school hockey programs, conducting practices and offering instruction to teams including the Dodge County Wildcats. She has cited the importance of giving back to the communities that supported her development, noting that players like Paige Haley, Reagan Haley, and Nicole Schammel returned to help at Red Wing practices during her youth, inspiring her to do the same. Since high school, Heise has regularly volunteered at youth hockey camps and clinics in Red Wing to "give back to the community that has helped me so much."

== Career statistics ==
=== Regular season and playoffs ===
Note: GP = Games played; G = Goals; A = Assists; Pts = Points; PIM = Penalty minutes;

			Regular season					Playoffs
Season	Team	League	GP	G	A	Pts	PIM	GP	G	A	Pts	PIM
2018–19	University of Minnesota	WCHA	39	13	22	35	12	—	—	—	—	—
2019–20	University of Minnesota	WCHA	36	18	25	43	8	—	—	—	—	—
2020–21	University of Minnesota	WCHA	20	7	9	16	8	—	—	—	—	—
2021–22	University of Minnesota	WCHA	39	29	37	66	10	—	—	—	—	—
2022–23	University of Minnesota	WCHA	38	29	36	65	14	—	—	—	—	—
2023–24	PWHL Minnesota	PWHL	19	4	9	13	13	10	5	3	8	2
2024–25	Minnesota Frost	PWHL	29	8	14	22	6	8	1	6	7	2
2025–26	Minnesota Frost	PWHL	30	13	17	30	12	5	0	2	2	2
PWHL totals			78	25	40	65	26	23	6	11	17	6

=== International ===
Note: GP = Games played; G = Goals; A = Assists; Pts = Points; PIM = Penalty minutes;

				Regular season
Year	Team	Event	Result	GP	G	A	Pts	PIM
2016	United States	U18	1st place, gold medalist(s)	5	2	1	3	2
2017	United States	U18	1st place, gold medalist(s)	5	0	1	1	0
2018	United States	U18	1st place, gold medalist(s)	5	4	4	8	12
2022	United States	WC	2nd place, silver medalist(s)	7	7	11	18	2
2023	United States	WC	1st place, gold medalist(s)	7	1	11	12	6
2024	United States	WC	2nd place, silver medalist(s)	7	2	5	7	2
2025	United States	WC	1st place, gold medalist(s)	7	2	3	5	0
2026	United States	OG	1st place, gold medalist(s)	7	2	3	5	2
Junior totals				15	6	6	12	14
Senior totals				35	14	33	47	12

== Awards and honors ==
=== College ===
Year	Honors	Ref
2018	WCHA All-Rookie Team	
2020	WCHA Third Team All-League	
2022	WCHA Forward of the Year	
2022	WCHA Player of the Year	
2022	WCHA First Team All-League	
2022	CCM/AHCA Hockey First Team All-American	
2022	Patty Kazmaier Award	
2023	WCHA Forward of the Year	
2023	WCHA First Team All-League	
2023	CCM/AHCA Hockey First Team All-American	

=== Professional ===
Year	Honors	Ref
2024, 2025	Walter Cup Champion	
2024	Ilana Kloss Playoff MVP	
2026	PWHL All-First Team	

=== International ===
Year	Honors	Ref
2018	IIHF U18 Women's World Championship Best Forward	
2018	IIHF U18 Women's World Championship Most Valuable Player	
2018	IIHF U18 Women's World Championship Media All-Star Team	
2022	IIHF Women's World Championship Best Forward	
2022	IIHF Women's World Championship Most Valuable Player	
2022	IIHF Women's World Championship Media All-Star Team	

Awards and achievements
Preceded by Aerin Frankel	Patty Kazmaier Award; 2021–22	Succeeded by Sophie Jaques
Preceded by Inaugural	PWHL first overall draft pick 2023	Succeeded by Sarah Fillier
