= Rideau Carleton Raceway =

Canadian horse racing and gambling complex

Coordinates: 45.296385°N 75.603147°W

- Interactive map of Rideau Carleton Raceway
- Location: 4837 Albion Road; Ottawa, Ontario, Canada
- Owned by: Hard Rock International (51%); Rideau Carleton Raceway Holdings Limited (49%)
- Date opened: September 1, 1962
- Date closed: March 2026
- Capacity: 5,500
- Notable races: Frank Ryan Memorial Trot; Des Smith Classic Pace

Rideau Carleton Raceway was a race track for Standardbred harness racing in Ottawa, Ontario, Canada. The track which opened in 1962 and closed in March 2026. Rideau Carleton was also the site of the Capital Fair, formerly the Gloucester Fair, from 1998 until 2024.

The site now also operates as a gambling facility under the Hard Rock Casino brand. The raceway provides facilities for numerous charitable fundraisers and hosts annual events for several embassies.

== History ==
The brainchild of James William Baskin, who was a member of Parliament, Rideau Carleton opened for racing on 1 September 1962. The racetrack was situated on a plot of about 300 acres (120 ha) on the outskirts of Ottawa in Gloucester Township, only two miles from Ottawa Macdonald–Cartier International Airport.

The facilities were developed by architect and building director D'Arcy Helmer, who had previously designed several hospitals and schools in the Ottawa Valley but who had never previously visited a racetrack. Helmer drew his main inspiration from Scioto Downs in Columbus, Ohio. The grandstand and clubhouse were completed at a cost of CA$841,000 ($8.69 million in 2025 dollars), while the track itself cost $750,000. The facilities also included 12 fireproof barns plus 96 tack rooms and a restaurant for the horsepeople. Despite a successful opening, the racetrack was then plagued by bad weather, which contributed to the track going into receivership at the end of its first season. Overcoming this rocky start, Rideau Carleton celebrate its fiftieth anniversary in 2012 but ultimately closed the racetrack in March 2026.

=== Horse racing ===
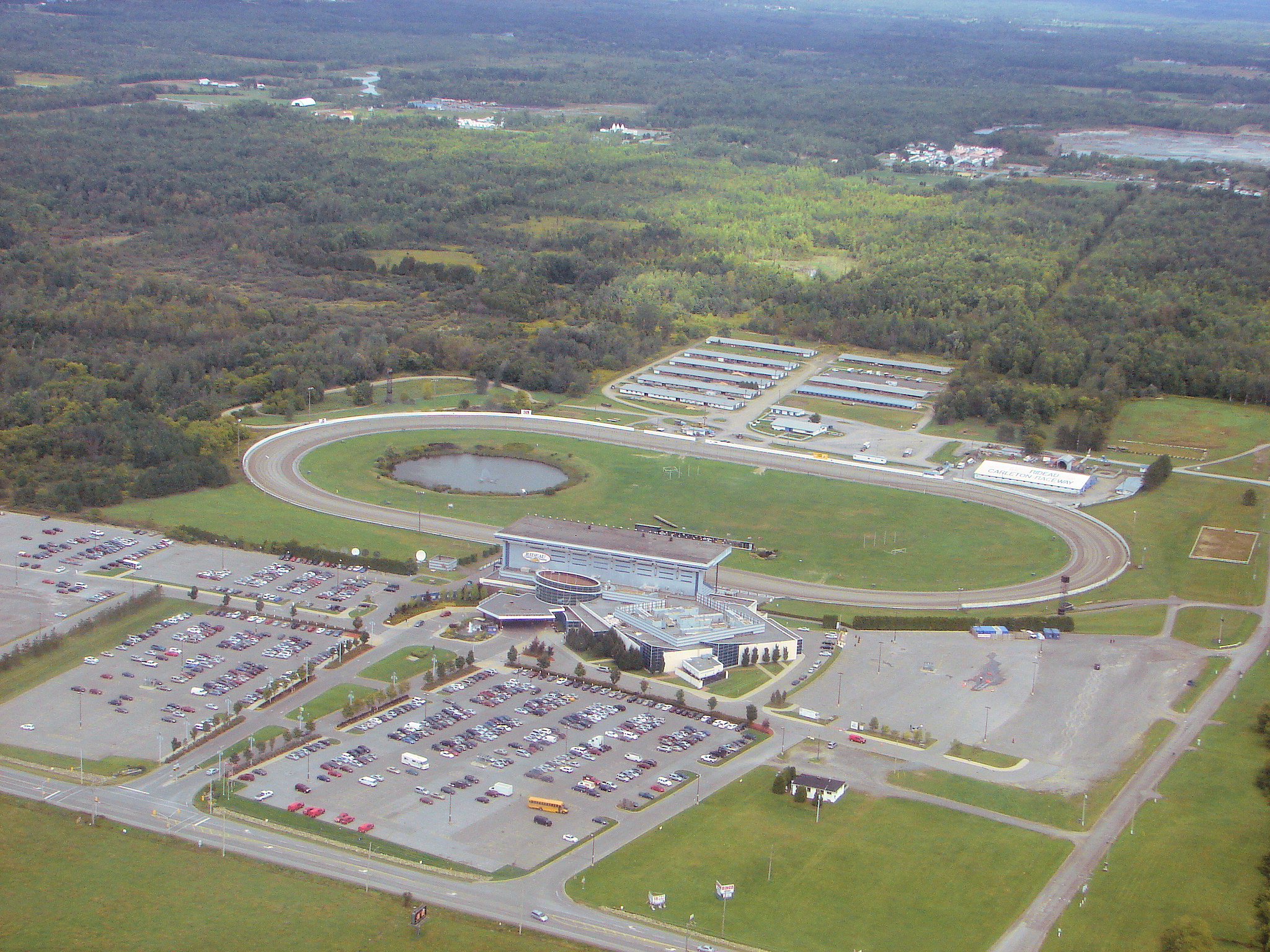
Aerial view of Rideau Carleton Raceway

The racetrack at Rideau Carleton is a five-eighths mile oval with a track speed rating (Note: The track speed rating compares the speed of horses on a given track with their speed on another track.) of 1:57.4, about average for tracks of the same dimensions. In 2017, the track had 91 live race dates scheduled; every Sunday evening except Christmas Eve plus Thursday evenings from April through October.

Most races at Rideau Carleton were for smaller purses of under $10,000. However, the track did feature several legs of the Ontario Sires Stakes program each August. Until 2012, the track also hosted the Des Smith Classic. In the 2006 renewal, featuring several of the fastest pacers of the time, Lis Mara set a Canadian record on a 5/8-mile track of 1:49.3. The record was broken in the 2011 renewal by Lis Mara's brother Lisagain, who paced the mile in 1:49.2. Although this is no longer the Canadian record, it is the Rideau Carleton track record.

=== Today ===
In 2000, the venue introduced slot machines, under the authority of the Ontario Lottery and Gaming Corporation (OLG) which were expected to generate annual revenue of $130 million.

The gaming operations at the site are currently run by Hard Rock International, which bought 51 percent of the stock in the facility in September 2017.

The site includes a restaurant and hosts musical performances.
