= Sarah Fillier =

Canadian ice hockey player (born 2000)

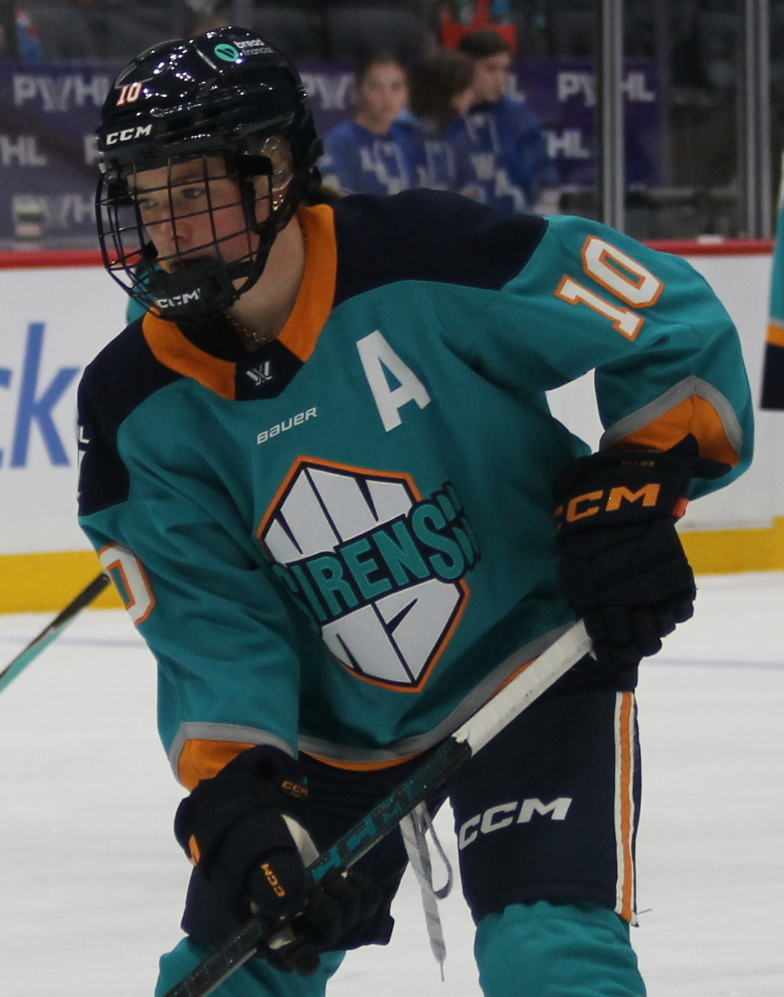
- Fillier with the New York Sirens in 2026
- Born: June 9, 2000 (age 26) Georgetown, Ontario, Canada
- Height: 5 ft 4 in (163 cm)
- Weight: 137 lb (62 kg; 9 st 11 lb)
- Position: Forward
- Shoots: Right
- PWHL team: New York Sirens
- National team: Canada
- Playing career: 2018–present
Medal record
Women's ice hockey
Representing Canada
Olympic Games
Gold medal – first place	2022 Beijing	Team
Silver medal – second place	2026 Milano Cortina	Team
World Championships
Gold medal – first place	2021 Canada
Gold medal – first place	2022 Denmark
Gold medal – first place	2024 United States
Silver medal – second place	2023 Canada
Silver medal – second place	2025 Czechia
Silver medal – second place	2026 Denmark
World U18 Championships
Silver medal – second place	2017 Czech Republic
Bronze medal – third place	2018 Russia

Sarah Anne Fillier (born June 9, 2000) is a Canadian ice hockey player who is a forward for the Canada women's national ice hockey team and the New York Sirens of the Professional Women's Hockey League (PWHL).

Internationally, Fillier has won Olympic gold at the 2022 Winter Olympics, where she finished second in tournament scoring with eight goals, and has won five medals at the IIHF Women's World Championship—three gold (2021, 2022, 2024) and three silver (2023, 2025, 2026). At the 2023 World Championship, she was named tournament MVP and Best Forward despite Canada's silver medal finish.

Fillier was selected first overall by New York in the 2024 PWHL draft after playing college ice hockey for the Princeton Tigers, where she recorded 93 goals and 194 points in 120 games. In her rookie season with the Sirens during the 2024–25 PWHL season, she tied Hilary Knight for the league lead with 29 points, earning the PWHL Points Leader and PWHL Rookie of the Year awards. She signed a two-year contract extension in July 2025, reportedly making her the highest-paid player in the league at the time.

== Early life ==
Born in Georgetown, Ontario, a town approximately 50 kilometers west of Toronto, to Maureen and Dave Fillier, Sarah was raised with her twin sister Kayla and older siblings Nicole and Trevor. The family was described as "hockey-crazed" who lived in a "hockey crazed town" and provided a supportive environment that encouraged her athletic pursuits from an early age. She attended Christ the King Catholic Secondary School in Georgetown and was a multi-sport athlete in high school, also participating in badminton, basketball, flag football, ultimate frisbee, and track and field.

Fillier began skating at age two and started playing hockey at age three or four. Immediately drawn to hockey, she would dress in full uniform for public skating sessions before she was allowed to play. She said, "I just wanted to play hockey so bad. I remember my dad telling stories of us at public skates and I would just skate as fast as I could, as many laps as I could for the whole hour and I would just rip in between everyone."

Fillier initially played on boys' youth hockey teams through local minor hockey associations in the Halton region, including the North Halton Twisters and Halton Hurricanes Boys AA. Around age 15, she transitioned to female-only programs, joining the Oakville Jr. Hornets of the Provincial Women's Hockey League (PWHL) in the 2015–16 season. With the team, Fillier recorded 11 points in 22 games as the Hornets claimed silver at the Ontario provincial level. In the 2016–17 season, Fillier scored 31 goals and 61 points as the Hornets claimed both league and provincial championships. Bestowed the Jr. Hornets captaincy for the 2017–18 season, Fillier led the league in playoff scoring with 12 points in 10 games and at the provincial tournament earned MVP honours. She and the Hornets would fall just short of repeat titles, losing in the finals of both the league and provincial tournaments.

== Playing career ==
=== College ===
During the 2018–19 season, Fillier led Princeton University in scoring with 22 goals and 57 points in 29 games. Her assists per game and points per game led the entire NCAA, as did her 21 power play points. Following the season she was named the Women's Hockey Commissioners Association National Rookie of the Year. She was also named ECAC Rookie of the Year, Ivy League Player of the Year, and Ivy League Rookie of the Year. Fillier was named a Second Team All-American by the American Hockey Coaches Association (AHCA), earned First Team All-ECAC and First Team All-Ivy honors, and was a top-10 finalist for the Patty Kazmaier Award.

Named team co-captain her sophomore season in 2019–20, Fillier matched the previous year's totals of 22 goals and 57 points, and her 1.84 points per game were the second best in the NCAA. In the ECAC tournament, she would record at least a point in each of five games, including a double-overtime game-winner against Quinnipiac University, and was named the tournament's Most Outstanding Player. She was named a Second Team All-American for the second consecutive year and a top-10 finalist for the Patty Kazmaier Award for the second straight season. She earned First Team All-ECAC and First Team All-Ivy honors and was one of three finalists for both ECAC Player of the Year and ECAC Best Forward.

Princeton did not compete in the 2020–21 season due to the coronavirus pandemic, and Fillier took a leave of absence in the 2021–22 season to compete with the Canadian national team. Returning to the NCAA for the 2022–23 season, Fillier's 19 goals, 18 assists, and 37 points were the best totals on the Tigers, and included a hat-trick against Quinnipiac on January 29, 2023.

In the 2023–24 season, Fillier scored a career-high 30 goals and 13 assists in just 29 games, leading her to be the projected first overall pick in the 2024 PWHL draft. She was named a Second Team All-American for the third time in her career and was a top-10 finalist for the Patty Kazmaier Award for the third time.

Fillier finished her Princeton career with 93 goals (sixth all-time in program history), 101 assists (second all-time), and 194 points (fourth all-time). She was a three-time Patty Kazmaier Award finalist (2019, 2020, 2024) and a three-time Second Team All-American (2019, 2020, 2024).

=== Professional ===
==== New York Sirens (2024–present) ====
===== 2024–25 season =====
External videos
- 2024 First Overall Pick Sarah Fillier, PWHL

On June 10, 2024, Fillier was selected first overall by PWHL New York, soon after rebranded as the New York Sirens, in the 2024 PWHL draft. After a long period of negotiations, she signed a one-year contract with the club on November 1. During the 2024 – 25 season, she recorded 13 goals and 16 assists during the regular season. Her 29 points tied Hilary Knight for the league lead, as she claimed the PWHL Points Leader award. She was also named the PWHL Rookie of the Year. On July 10, 2025, she signed a two-year contract extension with the Sirens which made her the highest paid player in the league at the time. Her 29 points were the most by a rookie in league history, surpassing the previous record by 10 points. In her second PWHL game on December 4, 2024, Fillier scored her first two career PWHL goals and added an assist in a 4–3 win over the Montréal Victoire, recording the first three-point game of her professional career.

External videos
- 2025 PWHL Rookie of the Year: Sarah Fillier, PWHL

In her rookie season, Fillier became the first player in PWHL history to score in five consecutive games, a streak that ran from February 15–28, 2025. She also was the first player in league history to record multiple four-game assist streaks. Fillier's 16 assists tied Renata Fast for the league lead and set a new PWHL single-season assist record. She also led the league with five power play goals and ranked fourth in total goals. She was named a PWHL First Team All-Star and was a finalist for the PWHL Forward of the Year award.

===== 2025–26 season =====
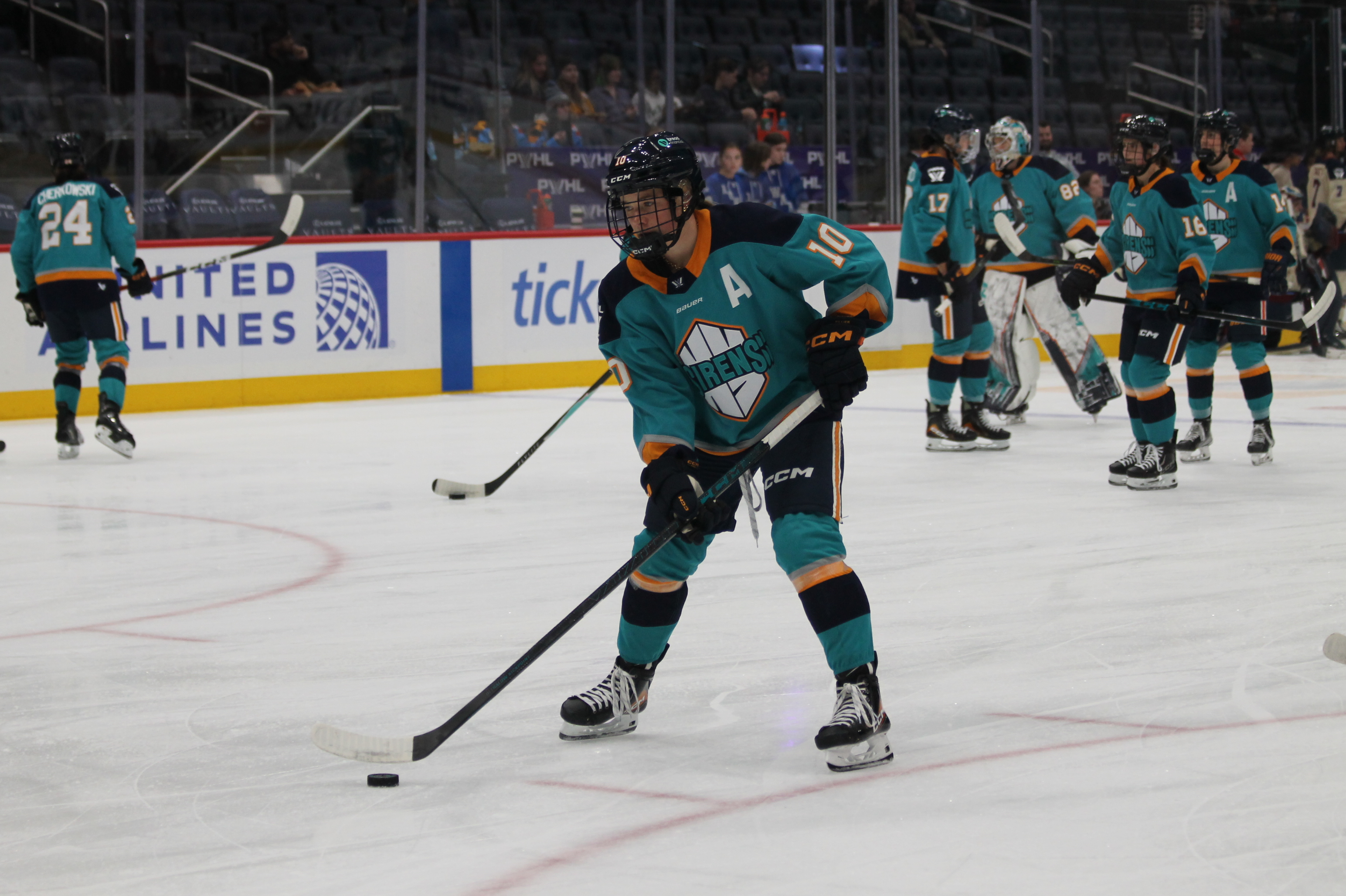
Fillier warms up with the New York Sirens before the PWHL Takeover Tour game vs. Montreal Victoire at Capital One Arena in Washington, DC, January 2026.

On November 15, 2025, Fillier was named an alternate captain for the Sirens alongside defender Jaime Bourbonnais. On December 28, 2025, she recorded an assist in a 4–3 win over the Seattle Torrent in Dallas as part of the PWHL Takeover Tour, marking her first point streak of the season with assists in consecutive games. During the game, she was checked to the head by Seattle's Aneta Tejralová at 11:25 of the first period, resulting in a five-minute major penalty and game misconduct for Tejralová. Fillier left the ice but returned and finished the game, though she missed the next game on December 31 with an upper-body injury.

On January 18, 2026, Fillier recorded her first multi-point game of the season with two assists in a 2–1 win over the Montréal Victoire in Washington, D.C., as part of the PWHL Takeover Tour. The game set a U.S. women's hockey attendance record with a crowd of 17,228 at Capital One Arena, surpassing the previous record of 16,014 set on November 28, 2025. With the performance, Fillier reached six assists on the season, all coming in the team's last five home games.

== International play ==
Fillier has represented Canada at both the senior and youth national team levels since 2016. In 2018, she played for the U18, U22, and senior national team all in one calendar year.

=== Youth ===
Fillier first joined the national team program in 2016. At age 16, she competed at the U18 World Championship in 2017, scoring three goals as Canada won a silver medal. One year later, she captained Canada's U18 team to a bronze medal at the 2018 tournament, finishing with five points in six games.

=== Senior ===
Fillier made her debut for the Canada women's national ice hockey team at the 2018 4 Nations Cup, where the team won silver. She scored her first goal for Team Canada during their 6-1 win over Sweden.

==== World Championships ====
After taking a leave of absence from Princeton in the 2021–22 season to compete with the national team, Fillier and Team Canada won a gold medal at the 2021 World Championship, where she recorded three goals and six points.

At the 2022 World Championship, Fillier scored five goals and 11 points en route to a gold medal.

At the 2023 World Championship, Fillier was named tournament MVP and Best Forward despite Canada finishing with a silver medal. She scored seven goals and added four assists for 11 points, also being named to the tournament all-star team.

Fillier represented Canada at the 2024 World Championship, playing on the top line with Marie-Philip Poulin. Canada won the gold medal with a 6–5 overtime victory over the United States. Fillier had two goals and an assist during the seven games of the tournament, scoring a goal in a 3–0 win over Switzerland and in a 4–0 semifinal win over Czechia.

==== Olympics ====
On January 11, 2022, Fillier was named to the national team for the 2022 Winter Olympics in Beijing. Canada won the gold medal, and Fillier finished second in tournament scoring with eight goals, including a hat-trick against Sweden in the quarterfinals.

On January 9, 2026, Fillier was named to Canada's roster to compete at the 2026 Winter Olympics in Milan. During the team's quarterfinal game against Germany, Fillier contributed a goal and assist in the match, leading the team to a 5-1 win. The goal that she assisted on, scored by Marie-Philip Poulin, allowed Poulin to equal Hayley Wickenheiser's record of 18 Olympic goals, the most in Olympic hockey history.

== Personal life ==
Fillier majored in psychology at Princeton University.

== Career statistics ==
=== Regular season and playoffs ===
			Regular season					Playoffs
Season	Team	League	GP	G	A	Pts	PIM	GP	G	A	Pts	PIM
2014–15	Oakville Jr. Hornets	Prov. WHL	1	1	0	1	0	—	—	—	—	—
2015–16	Oakville Jr. Hornets	Prov. WHL	22	5	6	11	18	1	0	1	1	0
2016–17	Oakville Jr. Hornets	Prov. WHL	34	24	26	50	18	12	7	4	11	6
2017–18	Oakville Jr. Hornets	Prov. WHL	22	15	15	30	28	10	6	6	12	12
2018–19	Princeton University	ECAC	29	22	35	57	30	—	—	—	—	—
2019–20	Princeton University	ECAC	31	22	35	57	34	—	—	—	—	—
2022–23	Princeton University	ECAC	31	19	18	37	39	—	—	—	—	—
2023–24	Princeton University	ECAC	29	30	13	43	26	—	—	—	—	—
2024–25	New York Sirens	PWHL	30	13	16	29	35	—	—	—	—	—
2025–26	New York Sirens	PWHL	29	9	14	23	14	—	—	—	—	—
PWHL totals			59	22	30	52	49	—	—	—	—	—

=== International ===
Year	Team	Event	Result	GP	G	A	Pts	PIM
2017	Canada	U18	2nd place, silver medalist(s)	5	3	0	3	4
2018	Canada	U18	3rd place, bronze medalist(s)	6	1	4	5	6
2021	Canada	WC	1st place, gold medalist(s)	7	3	3	6	6
2022	Canada	OG	1st place, gold medalist(s)	7	8	3	11	0
2022	Canada	WC	1st place, gold medalist(s)	7	5	6	11	6
2023	Canada	WC	2nd place, silver medalist(s)	7	7	4	11	2
2024	Canada	WC	1st place, gold medalist(s)	7	2	1	3	0
2025	Canada	WC	2nd place, silver medalist(s)	7	3	1	4	2
2026	Canada	OG	2nd place, silver medalist(s)	7	3	3	6	6
Junior totals				11	4	4	8	10
Senior totals				49	31	21	52	22

== Awards and honours ==
Award	Year	Ref
National Women's Under-18 Championship
Most Valuable Player	2017	
NCAA
Rookie of the Year	2019	
Second Team ACHA All-American	2019, 2020, 2024	
Second Team All-USCHO	2020, 2024	
ECAC
All-Academic Team	2019, 2020, 2023	
All-Rookie Team	2019	
Rookie of the Year	2019	
First Team All-Star	2019, 2020, 2024	
Tournament MVP	2020	
All-Tournament Team	2020	
Ivy League
Rookie of the Year	2019	
Player of the Year	2019	
First Team All-Star	2019, 2020, 2023, 2024	
International
World Championship – Media All-Star Team	2022, 2023	
World Championship – Best Forward	2023	
World Championship – Most Valuable Player	2023	
PWHL
PWHL Points Leader	2024–25	
PWHL Rookie of the Year	2025	
First All-Star Team	2025	
All-Rookie Team	2025	

Awards and achievements
Preceded by Taylor Heise	PWHL first overall draft pick 2024	Succeeded by Kristýna Kaltounková
