= Maddy Samoskevich =

American ice hockey player (born 2002)

- Born: November 15, 2002 (age 23) Sandy Hook, Connecticut, U.S.
- Height: 5 ft 5 in (165 cm)
- Position: Defence
- Shoots: Left
- PWHL team: Vancouver Goldeneyes
- Playing career: 2020–present

Madison Samoskevich (born November 15, 2002) is an American professional ice hockey defenceman for the Vancouver Goldeneyes of the Professional Women's Hockey League (PWHL). She played college ice hockey at Quinnipiac.

== Early life ==
Samoskevich began playing ice hockey with area youth teams when she was five years old. She also tried dance and track and field while in elementary school, before returning to hockey. She then attended Shattuck-Saint Mary's School in Minnesota.

== Playing career ==
=== College ===
Samoskevich began her collegiate career for Quinnipiac during the 2020–21 season, where she recorded one goal and seven assists in 14 games. During the 2021–22 season, in her sophomore year, she recorded four goals and eight assists in 39 games. During the 2022–23 NCAA season, in her junior year, she recorded three goals and 18 assists in 40 games. She ranked third on the team in blocked shots with 37. During the 2023–24 season, in her senior year, she recorded two goals and a career-high 20 assists in 37 games. She ranked third among defenceman on the team in blocked shots (38).

Prior to the 2024–25 season, she switched from defender to forward. As a graduate student, she recorded a career-high eight goals and 14 assists in 38 games. She ranked fourth on the team in points (22), and led the team in power-play goals (5) and faceoff wins (353). She finished her collegiate career with 19 goals and 65 assists in 168 games. Her 65 assists rank sixth all-time in program history.

=== Professional ===
On June 24, 2025, Samoskevich was drafted in the fifth round, 39th overall, by PWHL Vancouver in the 2025 PWHL Draft. She was drafted one week after her twin brother, Mackie, won the Stanley Cup with the Florida Panthers. On October 28, 2025, she signed a one-year contract with the Goldeneyes.

== Personal life ==
Samoskevich was born to Fred and Patty Samoskevich. She comes from a hockey-playing family. Her twin brother, Mackie, is a professional ice hockey player for the Seattle Kraken of the National Hockey League (NHL). Her older sister, Melissa is a former professional ice hockey player who last played for the Connecticut Whale of the Premier Hockey Federation.

== International play ==
Medal record

Representing United States

Ice hockey

World U18 Championship
Silver medal – second place	2019 Japan	

Cooper represented the United States at the 2019 IIHF World Women's U18 Championship where she recorded one goal and one assist in five games and won a silver medal.

== Career statistics ==
=== Regular season and playoffs ===
			Regular season					Playoffs
Season	Team	League	GP	G	A	Pts	PIM	GP	G	A	Pts	PIM
2020–21	Quinnipiac University	ECAC	14	1	7	8	8	—	—	—	—	—
2021–22	Quinnipiac University	ECAC	39	4	8	12	24	—	—	—	—	—
2022–23	Quinnipiac University	ECAC	40	3	18	21	6	—	—	—	—	—
2023–24	Quinnipiac University	ECAC	37	2	20	22	16	—	—	—	—	—
2024–25	Quinnipiac University	ECAC	38	8	14	22	6	—	—	—	—	—
2025–26	Vancouver Goldeneyes	PWHL	27	1	0	1	6	—	—	—	—	—
PWHL totals			27	1	0	1	6	—	—	—	—	—

=== International ===
Year	Team	Event	Result	GP	G	A	Pts	PIM
2019	United States	U18	2nd place, silver medalist(s)	5	1	1	2	2
Junior totals				5	1	1	2	2
