= Czech Republic at the 2026 Winter Olympics =

- Flag of the Czech Republic
- IOC code: CZE
- NOC: Czech Olympic Committee
- Website: www.olympic.cz (in Czech)

in Milan and Cortina d'Ampezzo, Italy 6 February 2026 – 22 February 2026
- Competitors: 115 (57 men and 58 women) in 14 sports
- Flag bearers (opening): David Pastrňák & Lucie Charvátová
- Flag bearers (closing): Metoděj Jílek & Martina Sáblíková
- Medals Ranked 16th: Gold 2 Silver 2 Bronze 1 Total 5

Winter Olympics appearances (overview)
- 1994; 1998; 2002; 2006; 2010; 2014; 2018; 2022; 2026

Other related appearances
- Czechoslovakia (1924–1992)

The Czech Republic, officially named Czechia by the IOC, competed at the 2026 Winter Olympics in Milan and Cortina d'Ampezzo, Italy, from 6 to 22 February 2026, with 115 competitors in 14 sports.

Hockey player David Pastrňák and biathlete Lucie Charvátová were the country's flagbearer during the opening ceremony. Meanwhile, speed skaters Metoděj Jílek and Martina Sáblíková were the country's flagbearer during the closing ceremony.

== Competitors ==
The following is the list of number of competitors participating at the Games per sport/discipline.

Sport	Men	Women	Total
Alpine skiing	2	6	8
Biathlon	5	5	10
Cross-country skiing	5	7	12
Curling	6	1	7
Figure skating	2	2	4
Freestyle skiing	3	3	6
Ice hockey	25	23	48
Luge	1	0	1
Nordic combined	2	-	2
Short-track speed skating	0	1	1
Skeleton	0	1	1
Ski jumping	1	3	4
Snowboarding	4	5	9
Speed skating	1	2	3
Total	57	59	116

== Medalists ==
The following Czech competitors won medals at the games. In the discipline sections below, the medalists' names are bolded.

Medal	Name	Sport	Event	Date
Gold	Zuzana Maděrová	Snowboarding	Women's parallel giant slalom	8 February
Gold	Metoděj Jílek	Speed skating	Men's 10,000 metres	13 February
Silver	Metoděj Jílek	Speed skating	Men's 5000 metres	8 February
Silver	Eva Adamczyková	Snowboarding	Women's snowboard cross	13 February
Bronze	Tereza Voborníková	Biathlon	Women's mass start	21 February

Medals by date
**Day**	**Date**	1st place, gold medalist(s)	2nd place, silver medalist(s)	3rd place, bronze medalist(s)	**Total**
2	08 February	1	1	0	**2**
7	13 February	1	1	0	**2**
15	21 February	0	0	1	**1**
Total		2	2	1	5

Medals by sport
Sport	1st place, gold medalist(s)	2nd place, silver medalist(s)	3rd place, bronze medalist(s)	Total
Snowboarding	1	1	0	**2**
Speed skating	1	1	0	**2**
Biathlon	0	0	1	**1**
Total	2	2	1	5

Medals by gender
Gender	1st place, gold medalist(s)	2nd place, silver medalist(s)	3rd place, bronze medalist(s)	Total
Male	1	1	0	**2**
Female	1	1	1	**3**
Mixed	0	0	0	**0**
Total	2	2	1	5

Multiple medalists
**Name**	**Sport**	1st place, gold medalist(s)	2nd place, silver medalist(s)	3rd place, bronze medalist(s)	**Total**
Metoděj Jílek	Speed skating	1	1	0	**2**

== Alpine skiing ==
The Czech Republic qualified two men and five women alpine skiers.

Men

Athlete	Event	Run 1		Run 2		Total	
Athlete	Event	Time	Rank	Time	Rank	Time	Rank
Marek Müller	Giant slalom	1:21.90	39	1:15.87	36	2:37.77	35
Marek Müller	Slalom	DNF					
Jan Zabystřan	Downhill	—N/a				1:54.39	24
Jan Zabystřan	Super-G	—N/a				1:26.87	17
Jan Zabystřan; Marek Müller	Team combined	1:55.68	20	55.02	20	2:50.70	20

Women

Athlete	Event	Run 1		Run 2		Total	
Athlete	Event	Time	Rank	Time	Rank	Time	Rank
Alena Labaštová	Downhill	—N/a				1:44.55	29
Barbora Nováková	Downhill	—N/a				1:41.89	25
Elisa Maria Negri	Downhill	—N/a				1:45.48	31
Ester Ledecká	Super-G	—N/a				DNF	
Alena Labaštová	Super-G	—N/a				1:27.94	20
Barbora Nováková	Super-G	—N/a				1:25.58	14
Elisa Maria Negri	Super-G	—N/a				1:29.21	24
Barbora Nováková; Martina Dubovská	Team combined	1:41.41	23	44.88	6	2:26.29	16
Elisa Maria Negri; Alena Labaštová	Team combined	1:45.22	25	46.94	18	2:32.16	18
Alena Labaštová	Giant slalom	1:09.05	45	1:14.95	37	2:24.00	38
Elisa Maria Negri	Giant slalom	DNF					
Alena Labaštová	Slalom	52.12	45	56.88	38	1:49.00	38
Martina Dubovská	Slalom	49.69	24	52.59	10	1:42.28	18
Celine Sommerová	Slalom	DNF					

== Biathlon ==
The Czech Republic qualified five female and five male biathletes through the 2024–25 Biathlon World Cup score.

Men

Athlete	Event	Time	Misses	Rank
Petr Hák	Individual	1:02:48.3	7 (2+2+1+2)	81
Vítězslav Hornig	Individual	56:47.0	2 (1+0+1+0)	26
Vítězslav Hornig	Pursuit	34:07.7	3 (1+0+0+2)	19
Vítězslav Hornig	Sprint	24:35.2	1 (1+0)	20
Vítězslav Hornig	Mass start	42:56.0	5 (2+0+1+2)	19
Mikuláš Karlík	Individual	1:00:48.6	5 (0+1+1+3)	68
Mikuláš Karlík	Pursuit	35:30.5	5 (1+1+1+2)	35
Mikuláš Karlík	Sprint	25:30.2	4 (1+3)	45
Michal Krčmář	Individual	57:45.4	4 (1+2+1+0)	38
Michal Krčmář	Pursuit	34:02.7	2 (1+0+0+1)	18
Michal Krčmář	Sprint	24:49.9	2 (0+2)	28
Michal Krčmář	Mass start	41:20.7	5 (0+0+1+4)	6
Tomáš Mikyska	Pursuit	36:25.6	4 (0+3+0+1)	45
Tomáš Mikyska	Sprint	25:05.3	1 (1+0)	33
Tomáš Mikyska; Vítězslav Hornig; Petr Hák; Michal Krčmář	Team relay	1:22:26.5	10 (0+10)	6

Women

Athlete	Event	Time	Misses	Rank
Markéta Davidová	Sprint	24:42.1	4 (3+1)	81
Lucie Charvátová	Individual	44:48.0	3 (0+2+0+1)	31
Lucie Charvátová	Pursuit	34:51.1	7 (1+2+2+2)	50
Lucie Charvátová	Sprint	22:55.5	2 (0+2)	46
Jessica Jislová	Individual	46:23.6	3 (0+0+1+2)	51
Tereza Vinklárková	Individual	43:36.2	1 (0+1+0+0)	11
Tereza Vinklárková	Pursuit	34:53.6	5 (1+2+2+0)	51
Tereza Vinklárková	Sprint	23:01.2	2 (0+2)	50
Tereza Voborníková	Individual	43:47.5	2 (0+1+0+1)	15
Tereza Voborníková	Pursuit	32:30.5	2 (0+0+0+2)	18
Tereza Voborníková	Sprint	22:09.8	1 (1+0)	19
Tereza Voborníková	Mass start	37:25.5	1 (1+0+0+0)	3rd place, bronze medalist(s)
Jessica Jislová; Lucie Charvátová; Tereza Voborníková; Tereza Vinklárková	Team relay	1:12:30.2	1+5 0+5	5

Mixed

Athlete	Event	Time	Misses	Rank
Vítězslav Hornig; Michal Krčmář; Tereza Voborníková; Markéta Davidová	Relay	1:07:17.2	1+6	11

== Cross-country skiing ==
The Czech Republic qualified one female and one male cross-country skier through the basic quota. Following the completion of the 2024–25 FIS Cross-Country World Cup, the Czech Republic qualified a further five female and four male athletes.

Distance
Men

Athlete	Event	Classical		Freestyle		Final		
Athlete	Event	Time	Rank	Time	Rank	Time	Deficit	Rank
Matyáš Bauer	10 km freestyle	—N/a		21:40.8	13	—N/a		
Matyáš Bauer	20 km skiathlon	24:10.0	21	24:01.2	33	48:41.2	+2:30.2	29
Matyáš Bauer	50 km classical	—N/a				2:17:23.6	+10:38.8	21
Michal Novák	10 km freestyle	—N/a		21:37.2	11	—N/a		
Michal Novák	20 km skiathlon	23:56.4	10	23:37.8	27	48:02.2	+1:51.2	19
Michal Novák	50 km classical	—N/a				DNF		
Mike Ophoff	10 km freestyle	—N/a		22:47.1	45	—N/a		
Mike Ophoff	20 km skiathlon	24:39.3	33	24:18.9	39	49:29.9	+3:18.9	40
Mike Ophoff	50 km classical	—N/a				2:20:43.8	+13:59.0	28
Jiří Tuž	10 km freestyle	—N/a		23:13.4	55	—N/a		
Jiří Tuž; Michal Novák; Matyáš Bauer; Mike Ophoff	4 × 7.5 km relay	—N/a				1:06:11.8	+1:59.1	7

Women

Athlete	Event	Classical		Freestyle		Final		
Athlete	Event	Time	Rank	Time	Rank	Time	Deficit	Rank
Barbora Havlíčková	10 km freestyle	—N/a		26:18.4	55	—N/a		
Barbora Havlíčková	20 km skiathlon	30:04.0	37	29:52.5	41	1:00:28.5	+6:43.3	39
Barbora Havlíčková	50 km classical	—N/a				2:34:32.5	+18:04.3	24
Anna Marie Jaklová	10 km freestyle	—N/a		26:14.1	54	—N/a		
Kateřina Janatová	10 km freestyle	—N/a		24:18.6	12	—N/a		
Kateřina Janatová	20 km skiathlon	28:15.4	9	27:14.6	8	55:59.0	+2:13.8	7
Kateřina Janatová	50 km classical	—N/a				WDR		
Anna Milerská	10 km freestyle	—N/a		26:10.6	53	—N/a		
Anna Milerská	20 km skiathlon	31:21.7	46	31:09.2	51	1:03:04.4	+9:19.2	51
Sandra Schützová	20 km skiathlon	29:53.5	33	28:52.8	32	59:18.5	+5:33.3	32
Sandra Schützová	50 km classical	—N/a				2:31:38.8	+15:10.6	18
Kateřina Janatová; Sandra Schützová; Anna Milerská; Anna Marie Jaklová	4 × 7.5 km relay	—N/a				1:20:58.6	+5:13.8	11

Sprint

Athlete	Event	Qualification		Quarterfinal		Semifinal		Final	
Athlete	Event	Time	Rank	Time	Rank	Time	Rank	Time	Rank
Ondřej Černý	Men's sprint	3:15.93	14 Q	3:38.72	3	Did not advance			
Michal Novák	Men's sprint	3:21.66	38	Did not advance					
Jiří Tuž	Men's sprint	3:13.48	4 Q	3:31.11	2 Q	3:41.00	1 Q	3:58.28	5
Barbora Antošová	Women's sprint	3:56.07	46	Did not advance					
Tereza Beranová	Women's sprint	4:00.30	49	Did not advance					
Anna Jaklová	Women's sprint	3:52.91	41	Did not advance					
Kateřina Janatová	Women's sprint	3:47.84	25 Q	3:59.20	3	Did not advance			
Jiří Tuž; Michal Novák	Men's team sprint	5:54.97	11 Q	—N/a				18:42.61	8
Sandra Schützová; Kateřina Janatová	Women's team sprint	7:01.82	14 Q	—N/a				22:11.43	14

== Curling ==
Summary

Team	Event	Group stage										Semifinal	Final / BM	
Team	Event	Opposition Score	Opposition Score	Opposition Score	Opposition Score	Opposition Score	Opposition Score	Opposition Score	Opposition Score	Opposition Score	Rank	Opposition Score	Opposition Score	Rank
Lukáš Klíma; Marek Černovský; Martin Jurík; Lukáš Klípa; Radek Boháč	Men's tournament	USA; L 7–8	SUI; L 3–7	NOR; L 4–7	GBR; L 4–7	ITA; L 5–10	CAN; L 2–8	GER; W 9–7	CHN; W 10–5	SWE; W 10–4	8	Did not advance		
Julie Zelingrová; Vít Chabičovský	Mixed doubles tournament	CAN; L 5–10	SWE; L 4–7	GBR; L 7–8	USA; L 1–8	KOR; W 9–4	SUI; L 3–10	NOR; W 6–3	ITA; L 2–8	EST; W 8–4	8	Did not advance		

=== Men's tournament ===
The Czech Republic qualified a men's team by earning enough points in the last two World Curling Championships. Team Lukáš Klíma qualified as Czech representatives by representing the country at both the 2024 and 2025 World Championships.

Final Round Robin Standings
Team	Skip	Pld	W	L	W–L	PF	PA	EW	EL	BE	SE	S%	DSC	Qualification
Switzerland	Yannick Schwaller	9	9	0	–	75	40	42	30	3	8	88.7%	9.506	Playoffs
Canada	Brad Jacobs	9	7	2	–	63	45	40	28	8	13	86.5%	28.844	Playoffs
Norway	Magnus Ramsfjell	9	5	4	1–0	60	61	37	38	6	7	80.8%	26.938	Playoffs
Great Britain	Bruce Mouat	9	5	4	0–1	63	48	39	33	2	10	86.4%	16.613	Playoffs
United States	Daniel Casper	9	4	5	1–1	52	65	34	37	5	3	81.7%	17.663	
Italy	Joël Retornaz	9	4	5	1–1	58	67	33	39	6	7	83.0%	17.869	
Germany	Marc Muskatewitz	9	4	5	1–1	51	57	36	37	8	7	84.4%	24.850	
Czech Republic	Lukáš Klíma	9	3	6	–	54	63	35	41	3	5	79.8%	29.013	
Sweden	Niklas Edin	9	2	7	1–0	44	63	31	39	6	3	82.5%	26.000	
China	Xu Xiaoming	9	2	7	0–1	52	63	35	40	3	5	81.4%	34.875	

Source: Official website

Round robin
The Czech Republic had a bye in draws 2, 6 and 10.

Draw 1
Wednesday, 11 February, 19:05

Sheet C	1	2	3	4	5	6	7	8	9	10	Final
Czech Republic (Klíma)	0	0	1	0	3	0	1	0	2	0	7
United States (Casper) 🔨	0	1	0	1	0	2	0	3	0	1	8

Draw 3
Friday, 13 February, 9:05

Sheet D	1	2	3	4	5	6	7	8	9	10	Final
Switzerland (Schwaller) 🔨	2	0	0	2	1	0	2	0	X	X	7
Czech Republic (Klíma)	0	0	1	0	0	1	0	1	X	X	3

Draw 4
Friday, 13 February, 19:05

Sheet B	1	2	3	4	5	6	7	8	9	10	Final
Czech Republic (Klíma) 🔨	0	0	1	0	1	0	1	0	1	X	4
Norway (Ramsfjell)	1	0	0	2	0	2	0	2	0	X	7

Draw 5
Saturday, 14 February, 14:05

Sheet A	1	2	3	4	5	6	7	8	9	10	Final
Czech Republic (Klíma)	0	1	0	1	0	0	0	2	0	X	4
Great Britain (Mouat) 🔨	2	0	2	0	1	1	0	0	1	X	7

Draw 7
Sunday, 15 February, 19:05

Sheet C	1	2	3	4	5	6	7	8	9	10	Final
Italy (Retornaz) 🔨	3	0	2	1	0	1	0	2	1	X	10
Czech Republic (Klíma)	0	2	0	0	1	0	2	0	0	X	5

Draw 8
Monday, 16 February, 14:05

Sheet B	1	2	3	4	5	6	7	8	9	10	Final
Czech Republic (Klíma)	0	0	0	0	1	0	1	0	X	X	2
Canada (Jacobs) 🔨	1	1	1	1	0	3	0	1	X	X	8

Draw 9
Tuesday, 17 February, 9:05

Sheet D	1	2	3	4	5	6	7	8	9	10	Final
Czech Republic (Klíma)	0	1	0	1	0	0	3	1	0	3	9
Germany (Muskatewitz) 🔨	2	0	1	0	1	1	0	0	2	0	7

Draw 11
Wednesday, 18 February, 14:05

Sheet D	1	2	3	4	5	6	7	8	9	10	Final
United States (Casper) 🔨	0	0	0	0	2	0	X	X	X	X	2
Great Britain (Mouat)	1	1	4	0	0	3	X	X	X	X	9

Draw 12
Thursday, 19 February, 9:05

Sheet A	1	2	3	4	5	6	7	8	9	10	Final
Sweden (Edin)	0	1	0	0	1	2	0	0	X	X	4
Czech Republic (Klíma) 🔨	1	0	2	2	0	0	2	3	X	X	10

=== Mixed doubles tournament ===
The Czech Republic qualified a mixed doubles team by winning the Olympic Qualification Event. Julie Zelingrová and Vít Chabičovský qualified as Czech representatives by winning the 2025 Czech Mixed Doubles Curling Olympic Trials, defeating 2022 Olympians Zuzana Paulová and Tomáš Paul 3–1 in the best-of-five series.

Final Round Robin Standings
Team	Athletes	Pld	W	L	W–L	PF	PA	EW	EL	BE	SE	S%	DSC	Qualification
Great Britain	Jennifer Dodds / Bruce Mouat	9	8	1	–	69	46	37	30	0	11	79.6%	20.931	Playoffs
Italy	Stefania Constantini / Amos Mosaner	9	6	3	1–0	60	50	32	31	1	11	78.3%	27.931	Playoffs
United States	Cory Thiesse / Korey Dropkin	9	6	3	0–1	58	45	36	33	0	12	83.1%	25.900	Playoffs
Sweden	Isabella Wranå / Rasmus Wranå	9	5	4	–	62	55	31	34	0	9	80.1%	19.413	Playoffs
Canada	Jocelyn Peterman / Brett Gallant	9	4	5	2–0	58	52	35	31	0	10	78.5%	36.050	
Norway	Kristin Skaslien / Magnus Nedregotten	9	4	5	1–1	52	47	37	33	0	12	77.1%	24.444	
Switzerland	Briar Schwaller-Hürlimann / Yannick Schwaller	9	4	5	0–2	56	67	32	35	0	6	74.5%	24.000	
Czech Republic	Julie Zelingrová / Vít Chabičovský	9	3	6	1–0	45	62	30	34	0	6	69.1%	16.019	
South Korea	Kim Seon-yeong / Jeong Yeong-seok	9	3	6	0–1	47	64	32	34	0	9	75.1%	42.425	
Estonia	Marie Kaldvee / Harri Lill	9	2	7	–	46	65	32	39	0	7	71.6%	19.300	

Source: Official website

Round robin
The Czech Republic had a bye in draws 3, 5, 7, and 12.

Draw 1
Wednesday, 4 February, 19:05

Sheet C	1	2	3	4	5	6	7	8	Final
Canada (Peterman / Gallant)	1	4	0	2	0	3	0	X	10
Czech Republic (Zelingrová / Chabičovský) 🔨	0	0	3	0	1	0	1	X	5

Draw 2
Thursday, 5 February, 10:05

Sheet B	1	2	3	4	5	6	7	8	Final
Czech Republic (Zelingrová / Chabičovský) 🔨	0	1	0	0	1	0	2	X	4
Sweden (Wranå / Wranå)	1	0	1	2	0	3	0	X	7

Draw 4
Thursday, 5 February, 19:05

Sheet D	1	2	3	4	5	6	7	8	Final
Czech Republic (Zelingrová / Chabičovský)	1	0	1	0	3	0	0	2	7
Great Britain (Dodds / Mouat) 🔨	0	3	0	2	0	2	1	0	8

Draw 6
Friday, 6 February, 14:35

Sheet A	1	2	3	4	5	6	7	8	Final
Czech Republic (Zelingrová / Chabičovský) 🔨	0	0	0	1	0	0	X	X	1
United States (Thiesse / Dropkin)	1	3	1	0	1	2	X	X	8

Draw 8
Saturday, 7 February, 14:35

Sheet B	1	2	3	4	5	6	7	8	Final
South Korea (Kim / Jeong)	0	1	1	0	0	2	0	X	4
Czech Republic (Zelingrová / Chabičovský) 🔨	2	0	0	2	2	0	3	X	9

Draw 9
Saturday, 7 February, 19:05

Sheet C	1	2	3	4	5	6	7	8	Final
Czech Republic (Zelingrová / Chabičovský) 🔨	0	1	0	1	0	1	0	X	3
Switzerland (Schwaller-Hürlimann / Schwaller)	2	0	1	0	4	0	3	X	10

Draw 10
Sunday, 8 February, 10:05

Sheet A	1	2	3	4	5	6	7	8	Final
Norway (Skaslien / Nedregotten)	0	1	0	0	1	0	1	0	3
Czech Republic (Zelingrová / Chabičovský) 🔨	1	0	2	1	0	1	0	1	6

Draw 11
Sunday, 8 February, 14:35

Sheet D	1	2	3	4	5	6	7	8	Final
Italy (Constantini / Mosaner)	0	3	2	2	1	0	X	X	8
Czech Republic (Zelingrová / Chabičovský) 🔨	1	0	0	0	0	1	X	X	2

Draw 13
Monday, 9 February, 10:05

Sheet D	1	2	3	4	5	6	7	8	Final
Czech Republic (Zelingrová / Chabičovský)	0	1	4	0	0	1	1	1	8
Estonia (Kaldvee / Lill) 🔨	2	0	0	1	1	0	0	0	4

== Figure skating ==
In the 2025 World Figure Skating Championships in Boston, the United States, the Czech Republic secured two quota in each of the ic

Athlete	Event	SD		FD		Total	
Athlete	Event	Points	Rank	Points	Rank	Points	Rank
Kateřina Mrázková; Daniel Mrázek	Ice dancing	72.09	17 Q	109.35	16	181.44	16
Natálie Taschlerová; Filip Taschler	Ice dancing	75.33	14 Q	109.67	15	185.00	15

== Freestyle skiing ==
Aerials

Athlete	Event	Qualification				Final			
Athlete	Event	Jump 1		Jump 2		Jump 1		Jump 2	
Athlete	Event	Score	Rank	Score	Rank	Score	Rank	Score	Rank
Nicholas Novak	Men's aerials	76.11	19	61.54	16	Did not advance			
Adéla Měrková	Women's aerials	50.17	24	48.62	25	Did not advance			

Moguls

Athlete	Event	Qualification								Final							
Athlete	Event	Run 1				Run 2				Run 1				Run 2			
Athlete	Event	Time	Points	Total	Rank	Time	Points	Total	Rank	Time	Points	Total	Rank	Time	Points	Total	Rank
Matyáš Kroupa	Men's moguls	24.02	53.08	68.75	24	DNF				Did not advance							

Dual moguls

Athlete	Event	1/16 Final	1/8 Final	Quarterfinal	Semifinal	Final	
Athlete	Event	Opposition Result	Opposition Result	Opposition Result	Opposition Result	Opposition Result	Rank
Matyáš Kroupa	Dual moguls	Kingsbury (CAN); L 10-35	Did not advance				

Ski cross

Athlete	Event	Seeding		1/8 final	Quarterfinal	Semifinal	Final	
Athlete	Event	Time	Rank	Position	Position	Position	Position	Rank
Daniel Paulus	Men's	1:08.84	27	2	4	Did not advance		
Diana Cholenská	Women's	1:17.02	26	3	Did not advance			
Lucie Krausová	Women's	1:20.27	29	4	Did not advance			

Qualification legend: Q - Qualify to next round; FA - Qualify to medal final; FB - Qualify to consolation final

== Ice hockey ==
Summary

Key:

- OT – Overtime
- GWS – Match decided by penalty-shootout

Team	Event	Group stage					Qualification playoff	Quarterfinal	Semifinal	Final / BM	
Team	Event	Opposition Score	Opposition Score	Opposition Score	Opposition Score	Rank	Opposition Score	Opposition Score	Opposition Score	Opposition Score	Rank
Czech Republic men's	Men's tournament	Canada; L 5–0	France; W 6–3	Switzerland; L 4–3 OT	—N/a	3 Q	Denmark; W 3–2	Canada; L 4–3 OT	Did not advance		8
Czech Republic women's	Women's tournament	United States; L 1–5	Switzerland; L 3–4^{GWS}	Finland; W 2–0	Canada; L 1–5	3 Q	—N/a	Sweden; L 2–0	Did not advance		5

=== Men's tournament ===
The Czech Republic men's national ice hockey team qualified a team of 25 players by finishing 8th in the 2023 IIHF World Ranking.

Roster

The first six players of Czechia's roster were announced on 16 June 2025. The remaining roster was named on 6 January 2026. On 7 February, Pavel Zacha was ruled out due to injury, with Filip Chlapík named as his replacement. On 8 February, Roman Červenka was named Czechia's captain, with Radko Gudas and David Pastrňák serving as alternate captains.

Head coach: Radim Rulík

No.	Pos.	Name	Height	Weight	Birthdate	Team
1	G	Lukáš Dostál	1.85 m (6 ft 1 in)	86 kg (190 lb)	22 June 2000 (aged 25)	(United States) Anaheim Ducks
3	D	Radko Gudas – A	1.83 m (6 ft 0 in)	94 kg (207 lb)	30 June 1990 (aged 35)	(United States) Anaheim Ducks
6	D	Michal Kempný	1.83 m (6 ft 0 in)	89 kg (196 lb)	8 September 1990 (aged 35)	(Sweden) Brynäs IF
7	D	David Špaček	1.83 m (6 ft 0 in)	86 kg (190 lb)	18 February 2003 (aged 22)	(United States) Iowa Wild
10	F	Roman Červenka – C	1.80 m (5 ft 11 in)	88 kg (194 lb)	10 December 1985 (aged 40)	(Czech Republic) Dynamo Pardubice
12	F	Radek Faksa	1.91 m (6 ft 3 in)	98 kg (216 lb)	9 January 1994 (aged 32)	(United States) Dallas Stars
14	F	Filip Chlapík	1.88 m (6 ft 2 in)	96 kg (212 lb)	3 June 1997 (aged 28)	(Czech Republic) Sparta Praha
17	D	Filip Hronek	1.83 m (6 ft 0 in)	85 kg (187 lb)	2 November 1997 (aged 28)	(Canada) Vancouver Canucks
18	F	Ondřej Palát	1.78 m (5 ft 10 in)	93 kg (205 lb)	28 March 1991 (aged 34)	(United States) New York Islanders
19	F	Jakub Flek	1.73 m (5 ft 8 in)	78 kg (172 lb)	24 December 1992 (aged 33)	(Czech Republic) Kometa Brno
23	F	Lukáš Sedlák	1.83 m (6 ft 0 in)	98 kg (216 lb)	25 February 1993 (aged 32)	(Czech Republic) Dynamo Pardubice
26	D	Jiří Ticháček	1.75 m (5 ft 9 in)	77 kg (170 lb)	30 January 2003 (aged 23)	(Finland) Oulun Kärpät
44	D	Jan Rutta	1.91 m (6 ft 3 in)	93 kg (205 lb)	29 July 1990 (aged 35)	(Switzerland) Genève-Servette HC
48	F	Tomáš Hertl	1.91 m (6 ft 3 in)	97 kg (214 lb)	12 November 1993 (aged 32)	(United States) Vegas Golden Knights
50	G	Karel Vejmelka	1.93 m (6 ft 4 in)	102 kg (225 lb)	25 May 1996 (aged 29)	(United States) Utah Mammoth
51	D	Radim Šimek	1.83 m (6 ft 0 in)	93 kg (205 lb)	20 September 1992 (aged 33)	(Czech Republic) Bílí Tygři Liberec
64	F	David Kämpf	1.88 m (6 ft 2 in)	90 kg (198 lb)	12 January 1995 (aged 31)	(Canada) Vancouver Canucks
80	G	Daniel Vladař	1.96 m (6 ft 5 in)	95 kg (209 lb)	20 August 1997 (aged 28)	(United States) Philadelphia Flyers
73	F	Ondřej Kaše	1.83 m (6 ft 0 in)	85 kg (187 lb)	8 November 1995 (aged 30)	(Czech Republic) HC Litvínov
81	F	Dominik Kubalík	1.88 m (6 ft 2 in)	86 kg (190 lb)	21 August 1995 (aged 30)	(Switzerland) EV Zug
84	D	Tomáš Kundrátek	1.88 m (6 ft 2 in)	91 kg (201 lb)	26 December 1989 (aged 36)	(Czech Republic) Oceláři Třinec
88	F	David Pastrňák – A	1.83 m (6 ft 0 in)	90 kg (198 lb)	26 May 1996 (aged 29)	(United States) Boston Bruins
93	F	Matěj Stránský	1.93 m (6 ft 4 in)	98 kg (216 lb)	11 July 1993 (aged 32)	(Switzerland) HC Davos
96	F	David Tomášek	1.88 m (6 ft 2 in)	95 kg (209 lb)	10 February 1996 (aged 30)	(Sweden) Färjestad BK
98	F	Martin Nečas	1.88 m (6 ft 2 in)	88 kg (194 lb)	15 January 1999 (aged 27)	(United States) Colorado Avalanche

Group play

Pos	Team	Pld	W	OTW	OTL	L	GF	GA	GD	Pts	Qualification
1	Canada	3	3	0	0	0	20	3	+17	9	Advance to quarterfinals
2	Switzerland	3	1	1	0	1	9	8	+1	5	Advance to qualification playoffs
3	Czechia	3	1	0	1	1	9	12	−3	4	Advance to qualification playoffs
4	France	3	0	0	0	3	5	20	−15	0	Advance to qualification playoffs

Source: IIHF
Rules for classification: Tiebreak criteria

12 February 2026; 16:40	Czechia	0–5 (0–1, 0–2, 0–2)	Canada	PalaItalia, Milan; Attendance: 11,451

Game reference

Lukáš Dostál
Goalies
Jordan Binnington
Referees:
(Sweden) Michael Holm
(Canada) Wes McCauley
Linesmen:
(United States) Nick Briganti
(Canada) Scott Cherrey

0–1	19:54 – Celebrini (Makar, McDavid)
0–2	26:40 – Stone (Marner, Crosby)
0–3	37:26 – Horvat (Marchand, Harley)
0–4	47:42 – MacKinnon (McDavid, Crosby) (PP)
0–5	53:22 – Suzuki (McDavid, Harley)

6 min
Penalties
2 min
26
Shots
36

13 February 2026; 16:40	France	3–6 (0–2, 3–2, 0–2)	Czechia	PalaItalia, Milan; Attendance: 11,174

Game reference

Martin Neckar
Julian Junca
Goalies
Daniel Vladař
Referees:
(Latvia) Andris Ansons
(Canada) Eric Furlatt
Linesmen:
(Canada) Matt MacPherson
(Canada) Tarrington Wyonzek

	0–1	05:56 – Nečas (Pastrňák, Hronek) (PP)
	0–2	13:04 – Kempný (Stránský, Faksa)
Boudon (Da Costa, Auvitu) (PP) – 21:01	1–2
Boudon (Bertrand) – 24:04	2–2
Gallet (Bertrand, Boudon) – 25:54	3–2
	3–3	33:23 – Pastrňák (Palát, Kempný)
	3–4	39:28 – Stránský (Faksa, Hronek) (SH)
	3–5	41:05 – Chlapík (Nečas, Kämpf)
	3–6	41:53 – Červenka (Sedlák, Špaček)

6 min
Penalties
4 min
12
Shots
38

15 February 2026; 12:10	Switzerland	4–3 OT (0–1, 2–0, 1–2) (OT: 1–0)	Czechia	PalaItalia, Milan; Attendance: 11,263

Game reference

Leonardo Genoni
Goalies
Lukáš Dostál
Referees:
(Canada) Michael Campbell
(United States) Chris Rooney
Linesmen:
(Finland) Onni Hautamäki
(Czech Republic) Libor Suchánek

	0–1	15:19 – Chlapík (Nečas, Kämpf)
Josi (Moser, Jäger) – 36:53	1–1
Meier (Josi, Hischier) (PP) – 38:37	2–1
	2–2	46:33 – Šimek (Chlapík, Nečas)
Suter (Moser, Meier) – 48:07	3–2
	3–3	57:54 – Nečas (Hronek, Pastrňák) (EA)
Kukan – 61:49	4–3

8 min
Penalties
6 min
29
Shots
32

Qualification play-offs

17 February 2026; 16:40	Czechia	3–2 (0–0, 3–2, 0–0)	Denmark	PalaItalia, Milan; Attendance: 10,364

Game reference

Lukáš Dostál
Goalies
Frederik Andersen
Referees:
(Canada) Dan O'Rourke
(United States) Kyle Rehman
Linesmen:
(United States) Nick Briganti
(United States) Jake Davis

Nečas (Hronek, Červenka) (PP) – 25:39	1–0
	1–1	29:02 – True (Blichfeld)
Kämpf (Rutta, Nečas) – 30:15	2–1
Červenka (Pastrňák) – 31:24	3–1
	3–2	37:12 – Olesen (Mølgaard, Blichfeld) (PP)

8 min
Penalties
4 min
31
Shots
26

Quarterfinals

18 February 2026; 16:40	Canada	4–3 OT (1–2, 1–0, 1–1) (OT: 1–0)	Czechia	PalaItalia, Milan; Attendance: 10,984

Game reference

Jordan Binnington
Goalies
Lukáš Dostál
Referees:
(Sweden) Mikael Holm
(United States) Chris Rooney
Linesmen:
(Canada) David Brisebois
(United States) Jonny Murray

Celebrini (McDavid) – 03:05	1–0
	1–1	08:34 – Sedlák (Červenka, Gudas)
	1–2	14:49 – Pastrňák (Hronek, Červenka) (PP)
MacKinnon (McDavid, Celebrini) (PP) – 32:16	2–2
	2–3	52:18 – Palát (Nečas, Hertl)
Suzuki (Toews, Jarvis) – 56:33	3–3
Marner (Celebrini, Harley) – 61:22	4–3

4 min
Penalties
6 min
41
Shots
24

=== Women's tournament ===
The Czech Republic women's national ice hockey team qualified a team of 23 players by finishing 4th in the 2024 IIHF World Ranking.

Roster

The roster was announced on 6 January 2026.

Head coach: (Canada) Carla MacLeod

No.	Pos.	Name	Height	Weight	Birthdate	Team
1	G	Michaela Hesová	1.69 m (5 ft 7 in)	60 kg (130 lb)	2 November 2005 (aged 20)	(United States) Dartmouth Big Green
2	D	Aneta Tejralová – C	1.64 m (5 ft 5 in)	57 kg (126 lb)	4 January 1996 (aged 30)	(United States) Seattle Torrent
3	F	Adéla Šapovalivová	1.61 m (5 ft 3 in)	58 kg (128 lb)	17 May 2006 (aged 19)	(United States) Wisconsin Badgers
4	D	Daniela Pejšová	1.73 m (5 ft 8 in)	73 kg (161 lb)	14 August 2002 (aged 23)	(United States) Boston Fleet
6	F	Linda Vocetková	1.74 m (5 ft 9 in)	70 kg (150 lb)	22 March 2007 (aged 18)	(Sweden) Djurgårdens IF
7	D	Klára Seroiszková	1.75 m (5 ft 9 in)	72 kg (159 lb)	25 January 2001 (aged 25)	(Switzerland) HC Davos
8	F	Tereza Pištěková	1.71 m (5 ft 7 in)	64 kg (141 lb)	3 June 2000 (aged 25)	(Sweden) SDE
10	F	Denisa Křížová – A	1.65 m (5 ft 5 in)	63 kg (139 lb)	3 November 1994 (aged 31)	(United States) Minnesota Frost
12	F	Klára Hymlárová	1.62 m (5 ft 4 in)	67 kg (148 lb)	27 February 1999 (aged 26)	(United States) Minnesota Frost
14	D	Dominika Lásková	1.67 m (5 ft 6 in)	71 kg (157 lb)	20 December 1996 (aged 29)	(Sweden) SDE
15	D	Andrea Trnková	1.76 m (5 ft 9 in)	75 kg (165 lb)	3 March 2004 (aged 21)	(United States) Clarkson Golden Knights
16	F	Kateřina Mrázová – A	1.63 m (5 ft 4 in)	64 kg (141 lb)	19 October 1992 (aged 33)	(Canada) Ottawa Charge
18	F	Michaela Pejzlová	1.70 m (5 ft 7 in)	62 kg (137 lb)	4 June 1997 (aged 28)	(Switzerland) HC Ambrì-Piotta
19	F	Natálie Mlýnková	1.61 m (5 ft 3 in)	63 kg (139 lb)	24 May 2001 (aged 24)	(Canada) Montreal Victoire
20	F	Barbora Juříčková	1.68 m (5 ft 6 in)	60 kg (130 lb)	21 October 2006 (aged 19)	(Finland) HPK Hämeenlinna
21	F	Tereza Vanišová	1.70 m (5 ft 7 in)	64 kg (141 lb)	30 January 1996 (aged 30)	(Canada) Vancouver Goldeneyes
22	F	Tereza Plosová	1.77 m (5 ft 10 in)	64 kg (141 lb)	5 July 2006 (aged 19)	(United States) Minnesota Golden Gophers
24	D	Sára Čajanová	1.68 m (5 ft 6 in)	63 kg (139 lb)	10 December 2002 (aged 23)	(Sweden) Brynäs IF
26	F	Vendula Přibylová	1.71 m (5 ft 7 in)	78 kg (172 lb)	23 March 1996 (aged 29)	(Sweden) Modo Hockey
28	D	Noemi Neubauerová	1.73 m (5 ft 8 in)	69 kg (152 lb)	15 December 1999 (aged 26)	(Switzerland) EV Zug
29	G	Klára Peslarová	1.64 m (5 ft 5 in)	63 kg (139 lb)	23 November 1996 (aged 29)	(Sweden) Brynäs IF
32	G	Julie Pejšová	1.72 m (5 ft 8 in)	91 kg (201 lb)	3 February 2003 (aged 23)	(Czech Republic) HC Milevsko 1934
98	F	Kristýna Kaltounková	1.74 m (5 ft 9 in)	77 kg (170 lb)	14 April 2002 (aged 23)	(United States) New York Sirens

Group play

Pos	Team	Pld	W	OTW	OTL	L	GF	GA	GD	Pts	Qualification
1	United States	4	4	0	0	0	20	1	+19	12	Quarter-finals
2	Canada	4	3	0	0	1	14	6	+8	9	Quarter-finals
3	Czechia	4	1	0	1	2	7	14	−7	4	Quarter-finals
4	Finland	4	1	0	0	3	3	13	−10	3	Quarter-finals
5	Switzerland	4	0	1	0	3	5	15	−10	2	Quarter-finals

Source: IIHF

5 February 2026; 16:40 v	United States	5–1 (1–0, 3–1, 1–0)	Czechia	Fiera Milano, Milan; Attendance: 3,766

Game reference

Aerin Frankel
Goalies
Klára Peslarová
Referees:
(Austria) Julia Kainberger
(Canada) Cianna Murray
Linesmen:
(Sweden) Jessica Lundgren
(Canada) Justine Todd

Carpenter (Keller, Edwards) (PP) – 15:55	1–0
Dunne (Janecke) – 23:13	2–0
Scamurra (Janecke) – 24:36	3–0
	3–1	28:37 – Juříčková (Mlýnková)
Knight (Carpenter, Bilka) – 37:50	4–1
Scamurra (Pannek) – 44:22	5–1

2 min
Penalties
6 min
42
Shots
14

6 February 2026; 14:40 v	Czechia	3–4 GWS (2–1, 0–0, 1–2) (OT: 0–0) (SO: 0–1)	Switzerland	PalaItalia, Milan; Attendance: 8,927

Game reference

Michaela Hesová
Goalies
Saskia Maurer
Referees:
(Sweden) Ida Henriksson
(United States) Samantha Hiller
Linesmen:
(Canada) Alexandra Clarke
(Canada) Erin Zach

Kaltounková (Šapovalivová, Hymlárová) – 01:32	1–0
	1–1	07:16 – Zimmermann
Mlýnková (Mrázová) – 08:33	2–1
Plosová – 46:09	3–1
	3–2	49:33 – Müller (Wey, Stalder) (PP)
	3–3	57:40 – Christen (Enzler, Müller)

Mrázová
Mlýnková (miss)
Hymlárová
Kaltounková (miss)
Šapovalivová
Mrázová (miss)
Hymlárová (miss)
Šapovalivová (miss)
Shootout
Stalder
Müller
Wey
(miss) Marti
(miss) Herzig
(miss) Müller
(miss) Stalder
Wey
4 min
Penalties
2 min
36
Shots
31

8 February 2026; 21:10 v	Czechia	2–0 (2–0, 0–0, 0–0)	Finland	Fiera Milano, Milan; Attendance: 3,805

Game reference
Klára Peslarová	Goalies	Anni Keisala	Referees: (Canada) Cianna Murray (United States) Amanda Tassoni; Linesmen: (Canada) Kirsten Welsh (Canada) Erin Zach
Pištěková (Juříčková) – 02:57 / 1–0; Mlýnková (Trnková) – 17:54 / 2–0			Referees: (Canada) Cianna Murray (United States) Amanda Tassoni; Linesmen: (Canada) Kirsten Welsh (Canada) Erin Zach
6 min	Penalties	6 min	Referees: (Canada) Cianna Murray (United States) Amanda Tassoni; Linesmen: (Canada) Kirsten Welsh (Canada) Erin Zach
24	Shots	25	Referees: (Canada) Cianna Murray (United States) Amanda Tassoni; Linesmen: (Canada) Kirsten Welsh (Canada) Erin Zach

9 February 2026; 21:10 v	Canada	5–1 (4–0, 1–0, 0–1)	Czechia	Fiera Milano, Milan; Attendance: 3,901

Game reference

Ann-Renée Desbiens
Goalies
Julie Pejšová
Michaela Hesová
Referees:
(Canada) Elizabeth Mantha
(United States) Amanda Tassoni
Linesmen:
(United States) Sarah Buckner
(Canada) Kirsten Welsh

O'Neill (Fast) – 05:44	1–0
Fillier (Watts, Nurse) – 13:12	2–0
Stacey (Maltais, Shelton) – 13:51	3–0
Gosling (Jenner, Ambrose) (PP2) – 18:57	4–0
Gosling (Jenner, Thompson) (PP) – 20:17	5–0
	5–1	48:38 – Mlýnková (Vanišová, Kaltounková) (PP)

10 min
Penalties
10 min
34
Shots
19

Quarterfinals

13 February 2026; 16:40 v	Czechia	0–2 (0–0, 0–1, 0–1)	Sweden	Fiera Milano, Milan; Attendance: 3,360

Game reference
Klára Peslarová	Goalies	Ebba Svensson Träff	Referees: (Canada) Michelle McKenna (United States) Amanda Tassoni; Linesmen: (United States) Sarah Buckner (Canada) Justine Todd
0–1 / 24:47 – Olsson (Svensson, Persson) (PP); 0–2 / 59:35 – Svensson (Kjellbin) (EN)			Referees: (Canada) Michelle McKenna (United States) Amanda Tassoni; Linesmen: (United States) Sarah Buckner (Canada) Justine Todd
8 min	Penalties	10 min	Referees: (Canada) Michelle McKenna (United States) Amanda Tassoni; Linesmen: (United States) Sarah Buckner (Canada) Justine Todd
29	Shots	23	Referees: (Canada) Michelle McKenna (United States) Amanda Tassoni; Linesmen: (United States) Sarah Buckner (Canada) Justine Todd

== Luge ==
Based on the results from the World Cups during the 2025–26 Luge World Cup season, the Czech Republic qualified 1 sled.

Athlete	Event	Run 1		Run 2		Run 3		Run 4		Total	
Athlete	Event	Time	Rank	Time	Rank	Time	Rank	Time	Rank	Time	Rank
Ondřej Hyman	Men's singles	54.299	21	54.318	21	54.299	21	Did not advance		2:43.438	22

== Nordic combined ==
Czech Republic qualified 4 athletes:

Athlete	Event	Ski jumping			Cross-country		Total	
Athlete	Event	Distance	Points	Rank	Time	Rank	Time	Rank
Jiří Konvalinka	Normal hill/10 km	96.0	117.4	18	33:03.9	23	34:04.9	20
Jiří Konvalinka	Large hill/10 km	125.0	120.5	21	26:41.0	25	28:39.0	25
Jan Vytrval	Normal hill/10 km	93.0	110.9	24	33:18.2	26	34:45.2	26
Jan Vytrval	Large hill/10 km	115.0	105.1	29	26:35.5	24	29:35.5	29
Jiří Konvalinka; Jan Vytrval	Team large hill/2×7,5 km	230.0	198.9	8	42:51.7	7	43:54.7	8

== Short-track speed skating ==
The Czech Republic qualified one female short-track speed skater after the conclusion of the 2025–26 ISU Short Track World Tour.

Athlete	Event	Heat		Quarterfinal		Semifinal		Final	
Athlete	Event	Time	Rank	Time	Rank	Time	Rank	Time	Rank
Petra Vaňková	Women's 1500 m	—N/a		DNF		Did not advance			

== Skeleton ==
Based on the world rankings, Czech republic qualified 1 sled.

Athlete	Event	Run 1		Run 2		Run 3		Run 4		Total	
Athlete	Event	Time	Rank	Time	Rank	Time	Rank	Time	Rank	Time	Rank
Anna Fernstädtová	Women's	57.90	12	57.86	11	57.83	=7	57.85	8	3:51.44	10

== Ski jumping ==
Czech Republic qualified 1 male and 3 female ski jumpers:

Athlete	Event	First round			Final			Total	
Athlete	Event	Distance	Points	Rank	Distance	Points	Rank	Points	Rank
Roman Koudelka	Men's normal hill	99.0	115.8	40	Did not advance				
Roman Koudelka	Men's large hill	119.0	107.7	42	Did not advance				
Anežka Indráčková	Women's normal hill	94.0	111.6	25 Q	96.0	115.4	15	227.0	18
Anežka Indráčková	Women's large hill	125.0	107.3	24 Q	116.0	100.2	26	207.5	27
Veronika Jenčová	Women's normal hill	80.5	78.4	47	Did not advance				
Veronika Jenčová	Women's large hill	DNS			Did not advance				
Klára Ulrichová	Women's normal hill	91.5	104.9	38	Did not advance				
Klára Ulrichová	Women's large hill	104.5	80.5	43	Did not advance				

== Snowboarding ==
Alpine

Athlete	Event	Qualification		Round of 16	Quarterfinal	Semifinal	Final	
Athlete	Event	Time	Rank	Opposition Time	Opposition Time	Opposition Time	Opposition Time	Rank
Kryštof Minárik	Men's giant slalom	1:29.75	30	Did not advance				
Ester Ledecká	Women's giant slalom	1:30.89	1 Q	Riegler (AUT); W	Payer (AUT); L +0.06	Did not advance		
Zuzana Maděrová	Women's giant slalom	1:31.48	2 Q	Loch (GER); W	Hofmeister (GER); W	Caffont (ITA); W	Payer (AUT); W	1st place, gold medalist(s)

Cross

Athlete	Event	Seeding		1/8 final	Quarterfinal	Semifinal	Final	
Athlete	Event	Time	Rank	Position	Position	Position	Position	Rank
Radek Houser	Men's	1:10.33	29	4	Did not advance			
Kryštof Choura	Men's	1:09.24	24	2 Q	4	Did not advance		
Eva Adamczyková	Women's	1:12.29	1	2 Q	1 Q	2 Q	2	2nd place, silver medalist(s)
Karolína Hrůšová	Women's	1:16.04	23	3	Did not advance			
Krystof Choura; Eva Adamczyková	Mixed team	—N/a			3	Did not advance		
Radek Houser; Karolína Hrůšová	Mixed team	—N/a			4	Did not advance		

Park & Pipe

Athlete	Event	Qualification					Final				
Athlete	Event	Run 1	Run 2	Run 3	Best	Rank	Run 1	Run 2	Run 3	Best	Rank
Jakub Hroneš	Men's big air	40.00	DNI	46.00	86.00	28	Did not advance				
Jakub Hroneš	Men's slopestyle	44.98	29.61	—N/a	44.98	21	Did not advance				
Laura Záveská	Women's big air	16.50	80.50	63.75	144.25	17	Did not advance				
Laura Záveská	Women's slopestyle	19.90	46.70	—N/a	46.70	23	Did not advance				

== Speed skating ==
The Czech Republic qualified three speed skaters (1 male and 2 women) through performances at the 2025-26 ISU Speed Skating World Cup.

Individual

Athlete	Event	Race	
Athlete	Event	Time	Rank
Metoděj Jílek	Men's 1500 m	1:46.08	16
Metoděj Jílek	Men's 5000 m	6:06.48	2nd place, silver medalist(s)
Metoděj Jílek	Men's 10000 m	12:33.43	1st place, gold medalist(s)
Martina Sáblíková	Women's 1500 m	WDR	
Martina Sáblíková	Women's 3000 m	WDR	
Martina Sáblíková	Women's 5000 m	7:07.08	11
Nikola Zdráhalová	Women's 500 m	39.00	26
Nikola Zdráhalová	Women's 1000 m	1:15.830	10
Nikola Zdráhalová	Women's 1500 m	1:56.93	14

Mass start

Athlete	Event	Semifinal			Final		
Athlete	Event	Points	Time	Rank	Points	Time	Rank
Metoděj Jílek	Men's mass start	6	8:12.96	6	0	8:10.90	14
Nikola Zdráhalová	Women's mass start	WDR					

== See also ==
- Czech Republic at the 2026 Winter Paralympics
