= Amanda Tassoni =

American ice hockey referee and player

- Born: May 2, 1989 (age 36) Smithfield, Rhode Island, U.S.
- Height: 5 ft 7 in (170 cm)
- Weight: 137 lb (62 kg; 9 st 11 lb)
- Position: Defense
- Shot: Left
- Played for: Rhode Island Rams
- Playing career: 2003–2011

Amanda Tassoni (born May 2, 1989) is an American ice hockey official, having officiated in American university competition, International Ice Hockey Federation (IIHF) events, and professional leagues including the Professional Women's Hockey League (PWHL). She was among ten female officials in the American Hockey League during their 2021-22 season. Of note, Tassoni also officiated at the 2026 Winter Olympics

== Playing career ==
From 2007 to 2011, Tassoni skated for the Rhode Island Rams women's ice hockey program. Appearing in 100 career games, she accumulated 72 points (15 goals, 57 assists). In 2013, she earned a master's degree in kinesiology from the University of Rhode Island.

== Officiating career ==
With the 2020–21 NWHL season held in a bubble in Lake Placid, New York, from January to February 2021, Tassoni was part of the officiating team.

Among the other female officials during the 21-22 AHL season included Kelly Cooke, Elizabeth Mantha and Kirsten Welsh. Of note, Cooke, Mantha and Welsh were also officials at the 2026 Olympics.

For the 2024–25 PWHL season, Tassoni was part of the officiating team.

At the 2025 NCAA Division I women's ice hockey tournament, Tassoni and Kelly Cooke officiated the March 15 quarterfinal match between Ohio State and St. Lawrence. In addition, both officiated the national championship match, which saw Wisconsin defeat Ohio State.

Among Tassoni's international experience, she has officiated at the 2022, 2023, 2024 and 2025 IIHF Women's World Championship events.

In Preliminary Round play at the 2026 Winter Olympics, Tassoni officiated three games. The first game she officiated took place on February 7, as Germany defeated Japan in Group B competition. The following day, Tassoni was part of the officiating crew with Cianna Murray, Kirsten Welsh and Erin Zach as Czechia blanked Finland by a 2-0 mark. Tassoni also officiated the game between Czechia and Canada on February 9, a 5-1 victory for Canada in Group A.

== Awards and Honors ==
- 2022 Distinguished Service Award - Rhode Island Interscholastic League
