= BHK =

BHK is a three-letter abbreviation that may refer to:

- BHK interpretation of intuitionistic predicate logic
- Baby hamster kidney cells used in molecular biology
- Bachelor of Human Kinetics (BHk) degree.
- Baltische Historische Kommission, organization dealing with history of Baltic Germans
- Biblia Hebraica (Kittel), by Rudolf Kittel
- British Hong Kong, a former colony in the Qing Dynasty and later in the People's Republic of China, now Hong Kong
- Bush Hill Park railway station, London, UK, National Rail station code
- Bukhara International Airport, Uzbekistan, IATA code
- Prosperous Armenia, Armenian political party
- Bedroom - Hall - Kitchen, as used in India to describe apartments: 2 BHK, 3 BHK… — see Wiktionary:BHK
