= Ice hockey at the 2026 Winter Olympics – Women's tournament =

2026 Winter Olympics

Tournament details
- Host country: Italy
- Venues: 2 (in 1 host city)
- Dates: 5–19 February
- Teams: 10

Final positions
- Champions: United States (3rd title)
- Runners-up: Canada
- Third place: Switzerland
- Fourth place: Sweden

Tournament statistics
- Games played: 28
- Goals scored: 126 (4.5 per game)
- Attendance: 158,130 (5,648 per game)
- Scoring leader: (United States) Megan Keller (9 points)

Awards
- MVP: (United States) Caroline Harvey

The women's tournament in ice hockey at the 2026 Winter Olympics took place in Milan, Italy, between 5 and 19 February 2026. Ten countries qualified for the tournament; six via ranking by the IIHF, three via qualification tournaments, and Italy as hosts. Russia and Belarus were banned from competing due to the countries' invasion of Ukraine.

Canada were the defending champions, having won the record-extending fifth Olympic title in 2022. The United States won the gold medal by defeating Canada 2–1 in OT in the gold medal game. Switzerland won the bronze medal for the second time in history.

== Venues ==
Ice hockey at the 2026 Winter Olympics venues
Milan
PalaItalia (Milano Santagiulia Ice Hockey Arena)	Fiera Milano (Milano Rho Ice Hockey Arena)
Capacity: 16,000 (11,800 of which for the public)	Capacity: 6,500
	Fiera Milano

== Qualified teams ==
Event	Date	Location	Vacancies	Qualified
Hosts	—N/a		1	Italy
2024 IIHF World Ranking	14 April 2024	—N/a	5	Canada; United States; Finland; Czech Republic; Switzerland
Final qualification tournaments	6 – 9 February 2025	(Japan) Tomakomai	2	Japan; France
Final qualification tournaments	6 – 9 February 2025	(Sweden) Gävle	1	Sweden
Final qualification tournaments	6 – 9 February 2025	(Germany) Bremerhaven	1	Germany
Total			10	

Notes

1. ^{a} The 2024 IIHF World Ranking comprised the following events: 2021 World Championship, 2022 World Championship, 2022 Winter Olympic Games, 2023 World Championship and 2024 World Championship.
2. ^{b} Utica was the site of the 2024 IIHF Women's World Championship; at the conclusion of the tournament the direct qualification slots were finalized; however, final qualification ranking was not determined until the completion of the Division IA tournament in Klagenfurt on 27 April.
3. ^{c} France replaced banned Russia both in the men's and women's tournament, filling the final seed in both.

== Format ==
The ten teams were split into two groups of five teams each, in which they played against each team once. All teams from Group A and the top-three ranked teams from Group B advanced to the quarter-finals. A knockout system was used after the group stage.

== Match officials ==
12 referees and ten linespeople were selected for the tournament, consisting of both International Ice Hockey Federation and Professional Women's Hockey League officials.

Referees		Linespeople	
(Austria) Julia Kainberger (IIHF); (Canada) Élizabeth Mantha (PWHL); (Canada) Michelle McKenna (PWHL); (Canada) Cianna Murray (PWHL); (Canada) Shauna Neary (PWHL); (Czech Republic) Zuzana Svobodová (IIHF)	(Finland) Anniina Nurmi (IIHF); (Sweden) Ida Henriksson (IIHF); (United States) Kelly Cooke (PWHL); (United States) Melissa Doyle (PWHL); (United States) Samantha Hiller (PWHL); (United States) Amanda Tassoni (PWHL)	(Canada) Alexandra Clarke (PWHL); (Canada) Laura Gutauskas (PWHL); (Canada) Justine Todd (PWHL); (Canada) Kirsten Welsh (PWHL); (Canada) Erin Zach (PWHL)	(Czech Republic) Kristýna Hájková (IIHF); (Finland) Tiina Saarimäki (IIHF); (Sweden) Jessica Lundgren (IIHF); (United States) Sarah Buckner (PWHL); (United States) Jennifer Cameron (PWHL)

== Preliminary round ==
Tie-breaking criteria for group stage ranking
The ranking of teams in each group was determined by the points obtained in all group matches. If two or more teams were equal on points, the following criteria were used to determine the ranking:
1. The result of their head-to-head match determined the ranking;

In case three or four teams were tied on points, the following criteria applied (if, after applying a criterion, only two teams remained tied, the result of their head-to-head match determined their ranking): Points obtained in head-to-head matches between the teams

4. Points obtained in the matches played between the teams in question;
5. Goal difference in the matches played between the teams in question;
6. Number of goals scored in the matches played between the teams in question;
7. If three teams remained tied, result of head-to-head matches between each of the teams concerned and the remaining team in the group (points, goal difference, goals scored);:
  - Points;
  - Goal difference;
  - Goals scored;
8. Better position in the most recent IIHF World Ranking.

All times are local (UTC+1).

=== Group A ===
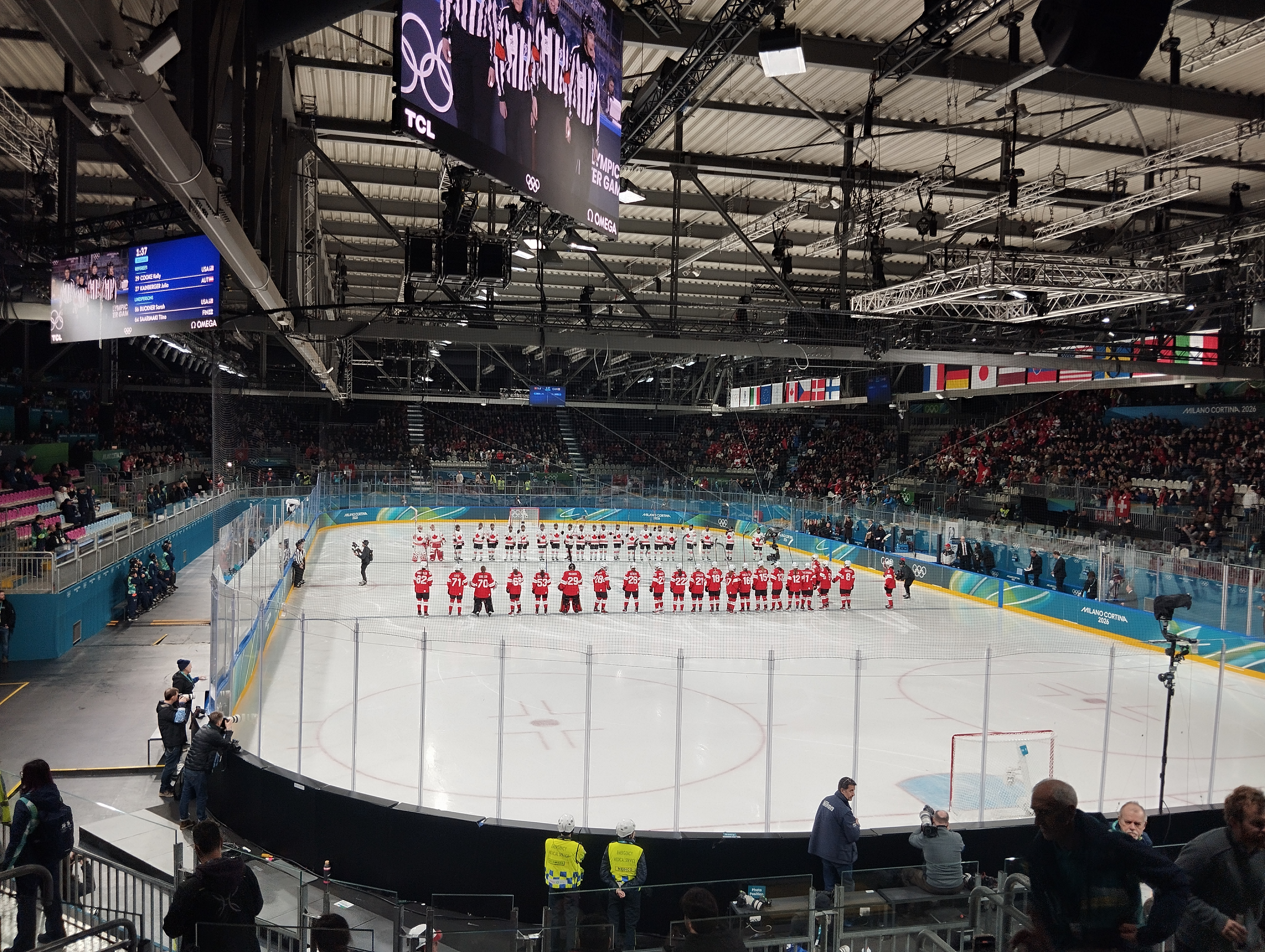
Switzerland – Canada

Pos	Team	Pld	W	OTW	OTL	L	GF	GA	GD	Pts	Qualification
1	United States	4	4	0	0	0	20	1	+19	12	Quarter-finals
2	Canada	4	3	0	0	1	14	6	+8	9	Quarter-finals
3	Czechia	4	1	0	1	2	7	14	−7	4	Quarter-finals
4	Finland	4	1	0	0	3	3	13	−10	3	Quarter-finals
5	Switzerland	4	0	1	0	3	5	15	−10	2	Quarter-finals

Source: IIHF

5 February 2026; 16:40 v	United States	5–1 (1–0, 3–1, 1–0)	Czechia	Fiera Milano, Milan; Attendance: 3,766

Game reference

Aerin Frankel
Goalies
Klára Peslarová
Referees:
(Austria) Julia Kainberger
(Canada) Cianna Murray
Linesmen:
(Sweden) Jessica Lundgren
(Canada) Justine Todd

Carpenter (Keller, Edwards) (PP) – 15:55	1–0
Dunne (Janecke) – 23:13	2–0
Scamurra (Janecke) – 24:36	3–0
	3–1	28:37 – Juříčková (Mlýnková)
Knight (Carpenter, Bilka) – 37:50	4–1
Scamurra (Pannek) – 44:22	5–1

2 min
Penalties
6 min
42
Shots
14

6 February 2026; 14:40 v	Czechia	3–4 GWS (2–1, 0–0, 1–2) (OT: 0–0) (SO: 0–1)	Switzerland	PalaItalia, Milan; Attendance: 8,927

Game reference

Michaela Hesová
Goalies
Saskia Maurer
Referees:
(Sweden) Ida Henriksson
(United States) Samantha Hiller
Linesmen:
(Canada) Alexandra Clarke
(Canada) Erin Zach

Kaltounková (Šapovalivová, Hymlárová) – 01:32	1–0
	1–1	07:16 – Zimmermann
Mlýnková (Mrázová) – 08:33	2–1
Plosová – 46:09	3–1
	3–2	49:33 – Müller (Wey, Stalder) (PP)
	3–3	57:40 – Christen (Enzler, Müller)

Mrázová
Mlýnková (miss)
Hymlárová
Kaltounková (miss)
Šapovalivová
Mrázová (miss)
Hymlárová (miss)
Šapovalivová (miss)
Shootout
Stalder
Müller
Wey
(miss) Marti
(miss) Herzig
(miss) Müller
(miss) Stalder
Wey
4 min
Penalties
2 min
36
Shots
31

7 February 2026; 16:40 v	United States	5–0 (1–0, 3–0, 1–0)	Finland	Fiera Milano, Milan; Attendance: 3,843

Game reference

Aerin Frankel
Goalies
Sanni Ahola
Referees:
(Sweden) Ida Henriksson
(Canada) Elizabeth Mantha
Linesmen:
(United States) Jennifer Cameron
(Canada) Justine Todd

Carpenter (Edwards, Keller) (PP) – 15:19	1–0
Heise (Murphy, Curl-Salemme) – 22:31	2–0
Keller – 23:37	3–0
Knight (Edwards, Keller) (PP) – 29:17	4–0
Murphy (Curl-Salemme, Harvey) – 55:56	5–0

0 min
Penalties
12 min
49
Shots
11

7 February 2026; 21:10 v	Switzerland	0–4 (0–0, 0–1, 0–3)	Canada	Fiera Milano, Milan; Attendance: 3,885

Game reference

Saskia Maurer
Goalies
Emerance Maschmeyer
Referees:
(United States) Kelly Cooke
(Austria) Julia Kainberger
Linesmen:
(United States) Sarah Buckner
(Finland) Tiina Saarimäki

0–1	27:02 – Spooner (Poulin, Fillier) (PP)
0–2	44:03 – Fillier (Fast, Watts) (PP)
0–3	53:36 – Gosling (Ambrose, Thompson) (PP)
0–4	56:44 – Watts (Nurse, Thompson)

12 min
Penalties
4 min
6
Shots
55

8 February 2026; 21:10 v	Czechia	2–0 (2–0, 0–0, 0–0)	Finland	Fiera Milano, Milan; Attendance: 3,805

Game reference
Klára Peslarová	Goalies	Anni Keisala	Referees: (Canada) Cianna Murray (United States) Amanda Tassoni; Linesmen: (Canada) Kirsten Welsh (Canada) Erin Zach
Pištěková (Juříčková) – 02:57 / 1–0; Mlýnková (Trnková) – 17:54 / 2–0			Referees: (Canada) Cianna Murray (United States) Amanda Tassoni; Linesmen: (Canada) Kirsten Welsh (Canada) Erin Zach
6 min	Penalties	6 min	Referees: (Canada) Cianna Murray (United States) Amanda Tassoni; Linesmen: (Canada) Kirsten Welsh (Canada) Erin Zach
24	Shots	25	Referees: (Canada) Cianna Murray (United States) Amanda Tassoni; Linesmen: (Canada) Kirsten Welsh (Canada) Erin Zach

9 February 2026; 20:40 v	Switzerland	0–5 (0–1, 0–1, 0–3)	United States	PalaItalia, Milan; Attendance: 11,132

Game reference

Andrea Brändli
Goalies
Gwyneth Philips
Referees:
(Austria) Julia Kainberger
(Canada) Shauna Neary
Linesmen:
(Canada) Laura Gutauskas
(Finland) Tiina Saarimäki

0–1	06:04 – Winn (Harvey, Knight)
0–2	34:08 – Dunne
0–3	41:17 – Bilka (Heise, Harvey)
0–4	46:34 – Carpenter (Knight, Dunne)
0–5	47:42 – Harvey (Carpenter, Dunne)

2 min
Penalties
4 min
21
Shots
50

9 February 2026; 21:10 v	Canada	5–1 (4–0, 1–0, 0–1)	Czechia	Fiera Milano, Milan; Attendance: 3,901

Game reference

Ann-Renée Desbiens
Goalies
Julie Pejšová
Michaela Hesová
Referees:
(Canada) Elizabeth Mantha
(United States) Amanda Tassoni
Linesmen:
(United States) Sarah Buckner
(Canada) Kirsten Welsh

O'Neill (Fast) – 05:44	1–0
Fillier (Watts, Nurse) – 13:12	2–0
Stacey (Maltais, Shelton) – 13:51	3–0
Gosling (Jenner, Ambrose) (PP2) – 18:57	4–0
Gosling (Jenner, Thompson) (PP) – 20:17	5–0
	5–1	48:38 – Mlýnková (Vanišová, Kaltounková) (PP)

10 min
Penalties
10 min
34
Shots
19

10 February 2026; 20:10 v	Canada	0–5 (0–2, 0–2, 0–1)	United States	PalaItalia, Milan; Attendance: 11,390

Game reference

Ann-Renée Desbiens
Emerance Maschmeyer
Goalies
Aerin Frankel
Referees:
(Austria) Julia Kainberger
(Finland) Anniina Nurmi
Linesmen:
(United States) Sarah Buckner
(Canada) Laura Gutauskas

0–1	03:45 – Harvey (Winn, Knight)
0–2	17:18 – Bilka (Murphy, Harvey)
0–3	21:18 – Simms (Janecke, Murphy) (PP)
0–4	33:00 – Bilka (Murphy, Harvey)
0–5	51:53 – Edwards (Curl-Salemme)

10 min
Penalties
4 min
20
Shots
33

10 February 2026; 21:10 v	Finland	3–1 (0–0, 3–1, 0–0)	Switzerland	Fiera Milano, Milan; Attendance: 3,790

Game reference

Sanni Ahola
Goalies
Saskia Maurer
Referees:
(United States) Samantha Hiller
(Canada) Elizabeth Mantha
Linesmen:
(Canada) Justine Todd
(Canada) Kirsten Welsh

Vainikka (Vanhanen, Nieminen) (PP) – 23:33	1–0
Liikala (Nylund, Vesa) – 29:50	2–0
	2–1	37:00 – Müller (SH)
Vanhanen (Karvinen, Schalin) (PP) – 37:35	3–1

2 min
Penalties
10 min
31
Shots
15

12 February 2026 (Note: The Finland v Canada match, originally scheduled on 5 February 2026, 21:10, was postponed to 12 February 2026, 14:30, due to cases of norovirus in the Finnish team.); 14:30 v	Finland	0–5 (0–1, 0–2, 0–2)	Canada	Fiera Milano, Milan; Attendance: 3,826

Game reference

Sanni Ahola
Goalies
Ann-Renée Desbiens
Referees:
(United States) Kelly Cooke
(United States) Melissa Doyle
Linesmen:
(Czech Republic) Kristýna Hájková
(Sweden) Jessica Lundgren

0–1	15:12 – Gardiner (Gosling, O'Neill)
0–2	31:38 – Watts (Fillier, Jaques)
0–3	33:40 – O'Neill (Shelton, Gosling)
0–4	41:22 – Clark (Turnbull, Stacey)
0–5	52:29 – Clark (Stacey)

0 min
Penalties
0 min
17
Shots
23

=== Group B ===
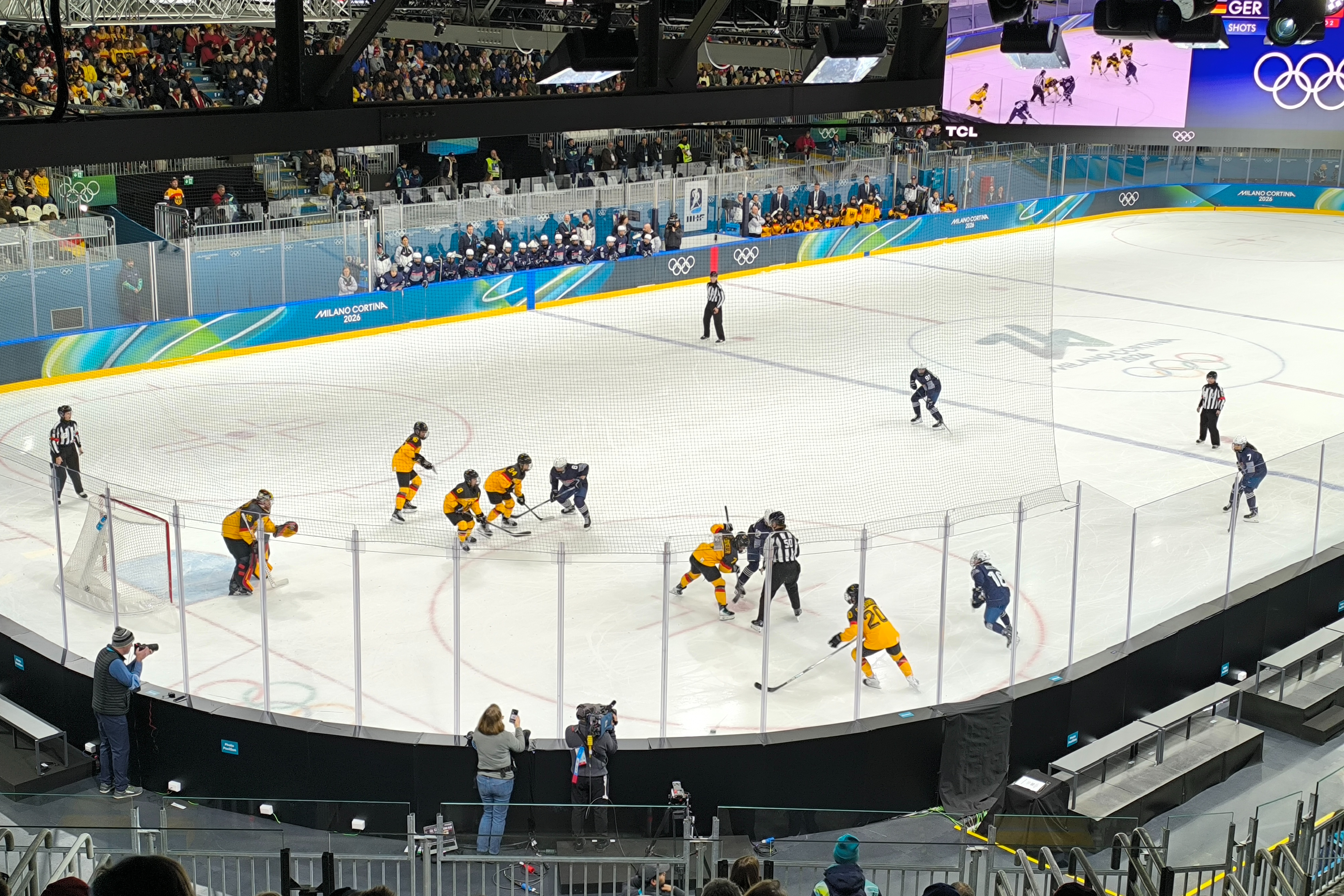
Germany – France

Pos	Team	Pld	W	OTW	OTL	L	GF	GA	GD	Pts	Qualification
1	Sweden	4	4	0	0	0	18	2	+16	12	Quarter-finals
2	Germany	4	2	1	0	1	10	8	+2	8	Quarter-finals
3	Italy (H)	4	2	0	0	2	9	11	−2	6	Quarter-finals
4	Japan	4	1	0	0	3	7	14	−7	3	Eliminated
5	France	4	0	0	1	3	4	13	−9	1	Eliminated

Source: IIHF
Rules for classification: Tiebreakers
(H) Host

5 February 2026; 12:10 v	Sweden	4–1 (1–1, 2–0, 1–0)	Germany	Fiera Milano, Milan; Attendance: 2,455

Game reference

Ebba Svensson Träff
Goalies
Sandra Abstreiter
Referees:
(Canada) Shauna Neary
(Finland) Anniina Nurmi
Linesmen:
(United States) Sarah Buckner
(Finland) Tiina Saarimäki

	0–1	08:30 – Jobst-Smith (Lu. Welcke, Strobel) (PP)
Ljungblom (Wikner, Raunio) – 11:53	1–1
Ljungblom (L. Johansson, Lundin) (PP) – 27:03	2–1
Jungåker (L. Johansson, Raunio) (PP) – 39:20	3–1
T. Johansson (Svensson, Olsson) – 51:20	4–1

2 min
Penalties
8 min
37
Shots
16

5 February 2026; 14:40 v	Italy	4–1 (1–1, 1–0, 2–0)	France	PalaItalia, Milan; Attendance: 9,356

Game reference

Martina Fedel
Goalies
Alice Philbert
Referees:
(United States) Kelly Cooke
(Canada) Elizabeth Mantha
Linesmen:
(United States) Jennifer Cameron
(Canada) Laura Gutauskas

	0–1	09:42 – De Serres (Rozier) (PP)
Tutino (Mattivi) – 10:42	1–1
Roccella (Della Rovere, Lobis) – 35:17	2–1
Fantin – 40:14	3–1
Della Rovere (Caumo) – 44:59	4–1

6 min
Penalties
6 min
46
Shots
15

6 February 2026; 12:10 v	France	2–3 (0–0, 1–1, 1–2)	Japan	Fiera Milano, Milan; Attendance: 3,424

Game reference

Alice Philbert
Goalies
Miyuu Masuhara
Referees:
(United States) Melissa Doyle
(Canada) Michelle McKenna
Linesmen:
(Czech Republic) Kristýna Hájková
(Canada) Kirsten Welsh

	0–1	38:34 – Ukita (Ak. Shiga, Sato)
Baudrit (Le Scodan, Peyne-Dingival) – 39:42	1–1
	1–2	56:30 – Ito (Koyama, Miura)
	1–3	57:50 – Maeda (Rir. Noro) (EN)
De Serres (Duvin, Aurard-Bushee) (PP, EA) – 59:48	2–3

2 min
Penalties
2 min
25
Shots
28

7 February 2026; 12:10 v	Germany	5–2 (3–0, 2–2, 0–0)	Japan	Fiera Milano, Milan; Attendance: 3,777

Game reference

Sandra Abstreiter
Goalies
Miyuu Masuhara
Riko Kawaguchi
Referees:
(Czech Republic) Zuzana Svobodová
(United States) Amanada Tassoni
Linesmen:
(Canada) Laura Gutauskas
(Sweden) Jessica Lundgren

Gleißner (Lu. Welcke, Kluge) – 00:44	1–0
Nix (Hark, Hadraschek) – 08:44	2–0
Handraschek (Nix, Kluge) – 13:03	3–0
Handraschek (Kluge, Gleißner) – 25:24	4–0
Kluge (Haider, Hark) – 30:30	5–0
	5–1	36:45 – Miura (Ak. Shiga, Ao. Shiga)
	5–2	37:07 – Wajima (Seki, Miura)

6 min
Penalties
6 min
29
Shots
22

7 February 2026; 14:40 v	Sweden	6–1 (1–0, 3–1, 2–0)	Italy	PalaItalia, Milan; Attendance: 10,727

Game reference

Ebba Svensson Träff
Goalies
Martina Fedel
Gabriella Durante
Referees:
(United States) Melissa Doyle
(Canada) Shauna Neary
Linesmen:
(Canada) Alexandra Clarke
(Czech Republic) Kristýna Hájková

Adolfsson (Thuvik, Hjalmarsson) – 09:50	1–0
Lundin (Raunio, Kjellbin) – 29:36	2–0
Hjalmarsson (Karlsson) – 31:47	3–0
	3–1	33:30 – Stocker
Olsson (Andersson, T. Johansson) – 34:39	4–1
T. Johansson (Ljungblom) – 46:53	5–1
T. Johansson (Olsson, Svensson) – 54:32	6–1

2 min
Penalties
4 min
47
Shots
19

8 February 2026; 16:40 v	France	0–4 (0–3, 0–1, 0–0)	Sweden	Fiera Milano, Milan; Attendance: 3,868

Game reference

Alice Philbert
Goalies
Emma Söderberg
Referees:
(Finland) Anniina Nurmi
(Czech Republic) Zuzana Svobodová
Linesmen:
(United States) Jennifer Cameron
(Sweden) Jessica Lundgren

0–1	03:30 – T. Johansson (Svensson, Olsson)
0–2	07:08 – Hjalmarsson (Olsson, Svensson) (PP)
0–3	13:14 – Thuvik (L. Johansson)
0–4	20:45 – L. Johansson (Thuvik, Hjalmarsson)

10 min
Penalties
6 min
14
Shots
49

9 February 2026; 12:10 v	Japan	2–3 (0–2, 1–0, 1–1)	Italy	Fiera Milano, Milan; Attendance: 3,769

Game reference

Miyuu Masuhara
Goalies
Gabriella Durante
Referees:
(United States) Samantha Hiller
(Canada) Michelle McKenna
Linesmen:
(Czech Republic) Kristýna Hájková
(Canada) Erin Zach

	0–1	12:34 – Fantin (Lobis, Tutino)
	0–2	18:51 – Fantin (Mattivi, Fortino) (PP)
Ukita (Rio Noro) – 22:48	1–2
	1–3	40:37 – Della Rovere
Ak. Shiga (Sato, Ao. Shiga) – 51:01	2–3

4 min
Penalties
6 min
29
Shots
23

9 February 2026; 16:40 v	Germany	2–1 OT (1–0, 0–0, 0–1) (OT: 1–0)	France	Fiera Milano, Milan; Attendance: 3,632

Game reference

Sandra Abstreiter
Goalies
Alice Philbert
Referees:
(United States) Melissa Doyle
(Czech Republic) Zuzana Svobodová
Linesmen:
(Canada) Alexandra Clarke
(Canada) Justine Todd

Kluge (Gleißner, Hadraschek) (PP) – 19:25	1–0
	1–1	48:21 – Duvin (Le Scodan)
Jobst-Smith (Li. Welcke, Lu. Welcke) – 61:07	2–1

6 min
Penalties
10 min
47
Shots
14

10 February 2026; 12:10 v	Japan	0–4 (0–1, 0–2, 0–1)	Sweden	Fiera Milano, Milan; Attendance: 3,100

Game reference

Riko Kawaguchi
Rei Halloran
Goalies
Ebba Svensson Träff
Referees:
(United States) Kelly Cooke
(Canada) Michelle McKenna
Linesmen:
(Canada) Alexandra Clarke
(Finland) Tiina Saarimäki

0–1	05:25 – Thuvik (Hjalmarsson)
0–2	25:36 – Bouveng (Raunio)
0–3	37:30 – Hallin (Bouveng, Persson)
0–4	41:06 – Olsson (Persson, T. Johansson) (PP)

8 min
Penalties
6 min
20
Shots
31

10 February 2026; 16:40 v	Italy	1–2 (0–0, 1–1, 0–1)	Germany	Fiera Milano, Milan; Attendance: 3,898

Game reference

Gabriella Durante
Goalies
Sandra Abstreiter
Referees:
(Sweden) Ida Henriksson
(Canada) Cianna Murray
Linesmen:
(United States) Jennifer Cameron
(Canada) Erin Zach

Reyes (Caumo, Della Rovere) – 20:21	1–0
	1–1	32:47 – Nix (Kluge, Gleißner)
	1–2	58:31 – Kluge (Jobst-Smith)

10 min
Penalties
8 min
24
Shots
24

=== Ranking after preliminary round ===
Pos	Grp	Team	Pld	W	OTW	OTL	L	GF	GA	GD	Pts
1	A	United States	4	4	0	0	0	20	1	+19	12
2	A	Canada	4	3	0	0	1	14	6	+8	9
3	A	Czechia	4	1	0	1	2	7	14	−7	4
4	A	Finland	4	1	0	0	3	3	13	−10	3
5	A	Switzerland	4	0	1	0	3	5	15	−10	2
6	B	Sweden	4	4	0	0	0	18	2	+16	12
7	B	Germany	4	2	1	0	1	10	8	+2	8
8	B	Italy (H)	4	2	0	0	2	9	11	−2	6

Source: IIHF
Rules for classification: 1) Tier of the group played in; 2) Rank within group.
(H) Host

== Playoff round ==
Teams were re-seeded after the quarter-finals according to the preliminary round ranking.

=== Bracket ===
Quarter-finals
13 February – Milan (Fiera Milano)
United States	6
Italy	0
14 February – Milan (Fiera Milano)
Canada	5
Germany	1
13 February – Milan (Fiera Milano)
Czechia	0
Sweden	2
14 February – Milan (Fiera Milano)
Finland	0
Switzerland	1

Semi-finals
16 February – Milan (PalaItalia)
United States	5
Sweden	0
16 February – Milan (PalaItalia)
Canada	2
Switzerland	1

Gold medal game
19 February – Milan (PalaItalia)
United States (OT)	2
Canada	1
Bronze medal game
19 February – Milan (PalaItalia)
Switzerland (OT)	2
Sweden	1

=== Quarter-finals ===
13 February 2026; 16:40 v	Czechia	0–2 (0–0, 0–1, 0–1)	Sweden	Fiera Milano, Milan; Attendance: 3,360

Game reference
Klára Peslarová	Goalies	Ebba Svensson Träff	Referees: (Canada) Michelle McKenna (United States) Amanda Tassoni; Linesmen: (United States) Sarah Buckner (Canada) Justine Todd
0–1 / 24:47 – Olsson (Svensson, Persson) (PP); 0–2 / 59:35 – Svensson (Kjellbin) (EN)			Referees: (Canada) Michelle McKenna (United States) Amanda Tassoni; Linesmen: (United States) Sarah Buckner (Canada) Justine Todd
8 min	Penalties	10 min	Referees: (Canada) Michelle McKenna (United States) Amanda Tassoni; Linesmen: (United States) Sarah Buckner (Canada) Justine Todd
29	Shots	23	Referees: (Canada) Michelle McKenna (United States) Amanda Tassoni; Linesmen: (United States) Sarah Buckner (Canada) Justine Todd

13 February 2026; 21:10 v	United States	6–0 (1–0, 5–0, 0–0)	Italy	Fiera Milano, Milan; Attendance: 3,930

Game reference

Gwyneth Philips
Goalies
Gabriella Durante
Referees:
(Sweden) Ida Henriksson
(Canada) Shauna Neary
Linesmen:
(Sweden) Jessica Lundgren
(Canada) Erin Zach

Keller (Edwards, Carpenter) – 13:31	1–0
Coyne (Harvey, Winn) – 21:41	2–0
Coyne (Curl, Zumwinkle) – 24:51	3–0
Edwards (Keller, Janecke) – 25:17	4–0
Curl (Dunne, Stecklein) (SH) – 31:29	5–0
Bilka (Heise, Harvey) – 38:27	6–0

8 min
Penalties
12 min
51
Shots
6

14 February 2026; 16:40 v	Canada	5–1 (2–0, 1–0, 2–1)	Germany	Fiera Milano, Milan; Attendance: 3,913

Game reference

Emerance Maschmeyer
Goalies
Sandra Abstreiter
Referees:
(United States) Melissa Doyle
(Finland) Anniina Nurmi
Linesmen:
(United States) Jennifer Cameron
(Czech Republic) Kristýna Hájková

Jenner (Maltais, Jaques) – 01:40	1–0
Thompson (O'Neill) – 16:41	2–0
Fillier (Fast, Watts) (PP) – 37:30	3–0
Turnbull (Clark) – 40:38	4–0
	4–1	48:42 – Feldmeier (SH)
Poulin (Fillier, Watts) (PP) – 55:30	5–1

6 min
Penalties
14 min
43
Shots
11

14 February 2026; 21:10 v	Finland	0–1 (0–0, 0–1, 0–0)	Switzerland	Fiera Milano, Milan; Attendance: 3,686

Game reference
Sanni Ahola	Goalies	Andrea Brändli	Referees: (United States) Samantha Hiller (Canada) Elizabeth Mantha; Linesmen: (Canada) Alexandra Clarke (Canada) Laura Gutauskas
0–1 / 34:17 – Müller (Enzler, Stalder)			Referees: (United States) Samantha Hiller (Canada) Elizabeth Mantha; Linesmen: (Canada) Alexandra Clarke (Canada) Laura Gutauskas
6 min	Penalties	6 min	Referees: (United States) Samantha Hiller (Canada) Elizabeth Mantha; Linesmen: (Canada) Alexandra Clarke (Canada) Laura Gutauskas
40	Shots	14	Referees: (United States) Samantha Hiller (Canada) Elizabeth Mantha; Linesmen: (Canada) Alexandra Clarke (Canada) Laura Gutauskas

=== Semi-finals ===
16 February 2026; 16:40 v	United States	5–0 (1–0, 4–0, 0–0)	Sweden	PalaItalia, Milan; Attendance: 7,894

Game reference

Aerin Frankel
Goalies
Ebba Svensson Träff
Emma Söderberg
Referees:
(Canada) Cianna Murray
(United States) Amanda Tassoni
Linesmen:
(Finland) Tiina Saarimäki
(Canada) Erin Zach

Barnes (Pannek, Stecklein) (EA) – 05:09	1–0
Heise (Bilka, Murphy) – 29:09	2–0
Murphy (Bilka, Winn) – 35:12	3–0
Coyne (Edwards, Keller) – 36:10	4–0
Scamurra (Curl-Salemme, Janecke) – 37:59	5–0

8 min
Penalties
6 min
34
Shots
23

16 February 2026; 21:10 v	Canada	2–1 (0–0, 2–0, 0–1)	Switzerland	PalaItalia, Milan; Attendance: 9,662

Game reference

Ann-Renée Desbiens
Goalies
Andrea Brändli
Referees:
(United States) Kelly Cooke
(United States) Melissa Doyle
Linesmen:
(United States) Sarah Buckner
(Czech Republic) Kristýna Hájková

Poulin (Jaques, Watts) – 21:49	1–0
Poulin (Watts, Shelton) – 28:21	2–0
	2–1	44:53 – Enzler (Müller)

6 min
Penalties
4 min
46
Shots
8

=== Bronze medal game ===
19 February 2026; 14:40 v	Switzerland	2–1 OT (0–0, 1–1, 0–0) (OT: 1–0)	Sweden	PalaItalia, Milan; Attendance: 8,243

Game reference

Andrea Brändli
Goalies
Ebba Svensson Träff
Referees:
(Canada) Élizabeth Mantha
(Finland) Anniina Nurmi
Linesmen:
(Canada) Alexandra Clarke
(Canada) Justine Todd

	0–1	31:40 – Jungåker (Svensson, T. Johansson)
Leemann (Marti) – 35:40	1–1
Müller (Wey, Christen) – 69:09	2–1

2 min
Penalties
4 min
25
Shots
33

=== Gold medal game ===
19 February 2026; 19:10 v	United States	2–1 OT (0–0, 0–1, 1–0) (OT: 1–0)	Canada	PalaItalia, Milan; Attendance: 11,171

Game reference

Aerin Frankel
Goalies
Ann-Renée Desbiens
Referees:
(United States) Kelly Cooke
(Canada) Cianna Murray
Linesmen:
(Czech Republic) Kristýna Hájková
(Finland) Tiina Saarimäki

	0–1	20:54 – O'Neill (Stacey, Fast) (SH)
Knight (Edwards, Keller) (EA) – 57:56	1–1
Keller (Heise) – 64:07	2–1

6 min
Penalties
2 min
33
Shots
31

== Medalists ==
Event	Gold	Silver	Bronze
Women's tournament	United States; Lee Stecklein; Cayla Barnes; Caroline Harvey; Megan Keller (A); Rory Guilday; Haley Winn; Kirsten Simms; Laila Edwards; Kelly Pannek; Grace Zumwinkle; Hayley Scamurra; Britta Curl-Salemme; Hilary Knight (C); Tessa Janecke; Hannah Bilka; Joy Dunne; Alex Carpenter (A); Kendall Coyne Schofield; Taylor Heise; Ava McNaughton (G); Aerin Frankel (G); Gwyneth Philips (G); Abbey Murphy Head coach: John Wroblewski	Canada; Sophie Jaques; Jocelyne Larocque (A); Kati Tabin; Laura Stacey; Sarah Fillier; Renata Fast; Ella Shelton; Brianne Jenner; Sarah Nurse; Erin Ambrose; Natalie Spooner; Emily Clark; Emma Maltais; Marie-Philip Poulin (C); Ann-Renée Desbiens (G); Emerance Maschmeyer (G); Blayre Turnbull (A); Claire Thompson; Kristin O'Neill; Kayle Osborne (G); Julia Gosling; Jenn Gardiner; Daryl Watts Head coach: Troy Ryan	Switzerland; Annic Büchi; Lara Stalder (C); Kaleigh Quennec (A); Shannon Sigrist; Laura Zimmermann; Lisa Rüedi; Ivana Wey; Laure Mériguet; Nicole Vallario; Lara Christen; Stefanie Wetli; Andrea Brändli (G); Rahel Enzler; Sinja Leemann; Alina Müller (A); Naemi Herzig; Alina Marti; Saskia Maurer (G); Vanessa Schaefer; Leoni Balzer; Monja Wagner (G); Lena-Marie Lutz; Alessia Baechler Head coach: Colin Muller

== Final ranking ==
The gold medal game and bronze medal game determined the top 4 teams. The remaining teams were ranked according to the preliminary round ranking.

Pos	Grp	Team	Pld	W	OTW	OTL	L	GF	GA	GD	Pts	Final result
1	A	United States	7	6	1	0	0	33	2	+31	20	Champions
2	A	Canada	7	5	0	1	1	22	10	+12	16	Runners-up
3	A	Switzerland	7	1	2	0	4	9	18	−9	7	Third place
4	B	Sweden	7	5	0	1	1	21	9	+12	16	Fourth place
5	A	Czechia	5	1	0	1	3	7	16	−9	4	Eliminated in quarter-finals
6	A	Finland	5	1	0	0	4	3	14	−11	3	Eliminated in quarter-finals
7	B	Germany	5	2	1	0	2	11	13	−2	8	Eliminated in quarter-finals
8	B	Italy (H)	5	2	0	0	3	9	17	−8	6	Eliminated in quarter-finals
9	B	Japan	4	1	0	0	3	7	14	−7	3	Eliminated in group stage
10	B	France	4	0	0	1	3	4	13	−9	1	Eliminated in group stage

Source: IIHF
(H) Host

2026 Women's Olympic champions

United States
3rd title

== Statistics ==
=== Scoring leaders ===
List shows the top ten skaters sorted by points, then goals.

Player	GP	G	A	Pts	+/−	PIM	POS
(United States) Megan Keller	7	3	6	9	+9	0	D
(United States) Caroline Harvey	7	2	7	9	+14	0	D
(United States) Laila Edwards	7	2	6	8	+8	2	D
(Canada) Daryl Watts	7	2	6	8	+2	2	F
(United States) Hannah Bilka	7	4	3	7	+8	0	F
(Sweden) Thea Johansson	7	4	3	7	+3	8	F
(Germany) Laura Kluge	5	3	4	7	+6	2	F
(Sweden) Hanna Olsson	7	3	4	7	+3	0	F
(United States) Abbey Murphy	7	2	5	7	+8	6	F
(Sweden) Hilda Svensson	7	1	6	7	+2	0	F

Note: Pos = Position; GP = Games played; G = Goals; A = Assists; Pts = Points; PIM = Penalty minutes; +/- = Plus/minus; PPG = Power-play goals; SHG = Short-handed goals; GWG = Game-winning goals

Source: IIHF

=== Leading goaltenders ===
Only the top five goaltenders, based on save percentage, who have played at least 40% of their team's minutes, are included in this list.

Player	TOI	GA	GAA	SA	Sv%	SO
(United States) Aerin Frankel	303:48	2	0.39	98	97.98	3
(Switzerland) Andrea Brändli	247:51	8	1.94	169	95.27	1
(Sweden) Ebba Svensson Träff	345:19	8	1.39	132	93.94	2
(France) Alice Philbert	239:47	12	3.00	179	93.30	0
(Czech Republic) Klára Peslarová	179:14	6	2.01	89	93.26	1

Note: Pos = Position;GP = Games played; Min, TOI = Minutes played; W = Wins; L = Losses; T,T/OT = Ties; OTL = Overtime losses; GA = Goals-against; GAA = Goals-against average; SO = Shutouts; SA = Shots against; SV = Shots saved; SV% = Save percentage;

Source: IIHF

== Awards ==
The awards were announced on 19 February 2026.

=== Media All-Stars ===
Position	Player
Goaltender	(Switzerland) Andrea Brändli
Defenceman	(United States) Caroline Harvey
Defenceman	(United States) Laila Edwards
Forward	(United States) Hannah Bilka
Forward	(Canada) Marie-Philip Poulin
Forward	(Switzerland) Alina Müller
MVP	(United States) Caroline Harvey

=== Individual awards ===
Position	Player
Goaltender	(Switzerland) Andrea Brändli
Defenceman	(United States) Caroline Harvey
Forward	(Canada) Marie-Philip Poulin

== Legacy ==
Megan Keller's golden goal puck and other artifacts from the game and the men's tournament were included in the Hockey Hall of Fame Olympics '26 collection. Also included in the collection was a game-worn jersey of US captain Hilary Knight.

== See also ==
- Ice hockey at the Winter Olympics
- Ice hockey at the 2026 Winter Olympics – Men's tournament
