= Ice hockey at the 2026 Winter Olympics =

Ice hockey at the XXV Olympic Winter Games
- Ice hockey pictogram
- Venues: PalaItalia; Fiera Milano
- Dates: 5–22 February 2026
- No. of events: 2 (1 men and 1 women)
- Competitors: 530 from 13 nations

Men's ice hockey at the XXV Olympic Winter Games

Medalists
1st place, gold medalist(s)		United States
2nd place, silver medalist(s)		Canada
3rd place, bronze medalist(s)		Finland

Women's ice hockey at the XXV Olympic Winter Games

Medalists
1st place, gold medalist(s)		United States
2nd place, silver medalist(s)		Canada
3rd place, bronze medalist(s)		Switzerland

The ice hockey competitions of the 2026 Winter Olympics was played at two venues located in the Milan cluster: the PalaItalia and one of the Fiera Milano pavilions.

The men's tournament had 12 teams competing, and the women's tournament 10. Russia and Belarus were banned from competing in international championships through the International Ice Hockey Federation's (IIHF) 2026 program due to their military aggression in Ukraine; the International Olympic Committee ruled that Russian and Belarusian could compete as "Individual Neutral Athletes" (AIN) but not in team events.

The United States won gold medals both in the men's and women's tournaments for the first time in the finals against Canada, both in overtime, while Switzerland won bronze in the women's tournament and Finland in the men's tournament.

== Medal summary ==
=== Medal table ===
Rank	Nation	Gold	Silver	Bronze	Total
1	United States	2	0	0	2
2	Canada	0	2	0	2
3	Finland	0	0	1	1
3	Switzerland	0	0	1	1
Totals (4 entries)		2	2	2	6

=== Medalists ===
Event	Gold	Silver	Bronze
Men's	United States: Matt Boldy; Kyle Connor; Jack Eichel; Brock Faber; Jake Guentzel; Noah Hanifin; Connor Hellebuyck; Jack Hughes; Quinn Hughes; Clayton Keller; Jackson LaCombe; Dylan Larkin; Auston Matthews; Charlie McAvoy; J. T. Miller; Brock Nelson; Jake Oettinger; Tage Thompson; Brady Tkachuk; Matthew Tkachuk; Vincent Trocheck; Jake Sanderson; Jaccob Slavin; Jeremy Swayman; Zach Werenski	Canada: Sam Bennett; Jordan Binnington; Macklin Celebrini; Sidney Crosby; Drew Doughty; Brandon Hagel; Thomas Harley; Bo Horvat; Seth Jarvis; Darcy Kuemper; Nathan MacKinnon; Cale Makar; Brad Marchand; Mitch Marner; Connor McDavid; Josh Morrissey; Colton Parayko; Sam Reinhart; Travis Sanheim; Mark Stone; Nick Suzuki; Shea Theodore; Logan Thompson; Devon Toews; Tom Wilson	Finland: Sebastian Aho; Joel Armia; Mikael Granlund; Erik Haula; Miro Heiskanen; Roope Hintz; Henri Jokiharju; Kaapo Kakko; Oliver Kapanen; Joel Kiviranta; Joonas Korpisalo; Kevin Lankinen; Artturi Lehkonen; Mikko Lehtonen; Esa Lindell; Anton Lundell; Eetu Luostarinen; Nikolas Matinpalo; Niko Mikkola; Olli Määttä; Mikko Rantanen; Rasmus Ristolainen; Juuse Saros; Teuvo Teräväinen; Eeli Tolvanen
Women's	United States: Cayla Barnes; Hannah Bilka; Alex Carpenter; Kendall Coyne Schofield; Britta Curl-Salemme; Joy Dunne; Laila Edwards; Aerin Frankel; Rory Guilday; Caroline Harvey; Taylor Heise; Tessa Janecke; Megan Keller; Hilary Knight; Ava McNaughton; Abbey Murphy; Kelly Pannek; Gwyneth Philips; Hayley Scamurra; Kirsten Simms; Lee Stecklein; Haley Winn; Grace Zumwinkle	Canada: Erin Ambrose; Emily Clark; Ann-Renée Desbiens; Renata Fast; Sarah Fillier; Jenn Gardiner; Julia Gosling; Sophie Jaques; Brianne Jenner; Jocelyne Larocque; Emma Maltais; Emerance Maschmeyer; Sarah Nurse; Kristin O'Neill; Kayle Osborne; Marie-Philip Poulin; Ella Shelton; Natalie Spooner; Laura Stacey; Kati Tabin; Claire Thompson; Blayre Turnbull; Daryl Watts	Switzerland: Alessia Baechler; Leoni Balzer; Andrea Brändli; Annic Büchi; Lara Christen; Rahel Enzler; Naemi Herzig; Sinja Leemann; Lena Lutz; Alina Marti; Saskia Maurer; Laure Mériguet; Alina Müller; Kaleigh Quennec; Lisa Rüedi; Vanessa Schaefer; Shannon Sigrist; Lara Stalder; Nicole Vallario; Monja Wagner; Stefanie Wetli; Ivana Wey; Laura Zimmermann

== Venues ==
Ice hockey at the 2026 Winter Olympics venues
Milan
PalaItalia (Milano Santagiulia Ice Hockey Arena)	Fiera Milano (Milano Rho Ice Hockey Arena)
Capacity: 16,000 (11,800 of which for the public)	Capacity: 6,500
	Fiera Milano

== Competition schedule ==
Ice hockey competitions were scheduled to start one day before the opening ceremony with the following schedule:

PR	Preliminary round	PO	Playoffs	QF	Quarter-finals	SF	Semi-finals	B	Bronze-medal match	G	Gold-medal match

Date Event	Wed 4	Thu 5	Fri 6	Sat 7	Sun 8	Mon 9	Tue 10	Wed 11	Thu 12	Fri 13	Sat 14	Sun 15	Mon 16	Tue 17	Wed 18	Thu 19		Fri 20	Sat 21	Sun 22
Men's tournament								PR	PR	PR	PR	PR		PO	QF			SF	B	G
Women's tournament		PR	PR	PR	PR	PR	PR		PR	QF	QF		SF			B	G			

== Men's tournament ==
The tournament featured twelve countries, eight qualifying through the IIHF World Ranking, the host Italy, and three through qualifying tournaments. The format remained the same as the previous four Olympics; three groups of four competed in three games to determine seeding, each played every other team in their group, followed by four rounds of elimination games. Each group winner received a bye into the second round, along with the highest ranked of the remaining teams. The remaining eight teams played an eliminating qualification game to advance to the quarter-final round. Each quarter-final winner advanced to the semi-finals, with the winners playing for the gold medal and the losers playing for the bronze.

On 2 February 2024, the IIHF announced that an agreement had been reached with the National Hockey League (NHL) for a break in its regular season to allow the league's players to participate in the Olympics for the first time since 2014. The NHL was originally scheduled to compete in 2022 as well but opted out due to the COVID-19 pandemic.

=== Qualification ===
Qualification for the men's tournament at the 2026 Winter Olympics was determined by the IIHF World Ranking following the 2023 Men's Ice Hockey World Championships. The top eight joined the hosts and three qualifiers.

=== Participating nations ===
The groups were established following the 2023 Men's Ice Hockey World Championships. Qualifiers one, two and three are the winners of the final qualification tournaments. Their designation was determined by their qualification seeding.

Group A	Group B	Group C
Canada; Czech Republic; Switzerland; France (Note: The IOC announced that Russia would not be allowed to participate in Milan-Cortina. This means that France replaced them both in the men's and women's tournament, filling the final seed in both.)	Finland; Sweden; Slovakia; Italy	United States; Germany; Latvia; Denmark

== Women's tournament ==
Ten countries competed in the women's tournament, six qualifying through the IIHF World Ranking, the host Italy, and three through qualifying tournaments.

=== Qualification ===
Qualification for the women's tournament at the 2026 Winter Olympics was determined by the IIHF World Ranking following the 2024 Women's Ice Hockey World Championships.

=== Participating nations ===
The groups were established following the 2024 Women's Ice Hockey World Championships. Qualifiers one, two, and three were the winners of the final qualification tournaments. Their designation was determined by their qualification seeding.

Group A	Group B
Canada; United States; Finland; Czech Republic; Switzerland	Germany; Sweden; Japan; Italy; France

== Qualification summary / Participating NOCs ==
Nations	Men	Women	Athletes
Canada	Yes	Yes	48
Czech Republic	Yes	Yes	48
Denmark	Yes		25
Finland	Yes	Yes	48
France	Yes	Yes	48
Germany	Yes	Yes	48
Italy	Yes	Yes	48
Japan		Yes	23
Latvia	Yes		25
Slovakia	Yes		25
Sweden	Yes	Yes	48
Switzerland	Yes	Yes	48
United States	Yes	Yes	48
Total: 13 NOCs	12	10	530

== See also ==
- Para ice hockey at the 2026 Winter Paralympics
