= Michelle McKenna =

Canadian ice hockey referee (born 1990)

- Born: 1990 (age 35–36); Moose Jaw, Saskatchewan, Canada
- Education: University of Saskatchewan
- Occupation: Ice hockey referee

Michelle McKenna (née Stapleton; born 1990) is a Canadian ice hockey referee who has officiated in the Professional Women's Hockey League (PWHL) and at International Ice Hockey Federation (IIHF) events. She was selected to referee the women's tournament at the 2026 Winter Olympics.

== Personal life and education ==
McKenna grew up in Moose Jaw. She attended the University of Saskatchewan, earning an engineering degree in 2013, and later worked for PCL Construction in Saskatchewan. She is married and has a daughter.

== Ice hockey officiating career ==
McKenna began officiating as a teenager, following her brother into refereeing. She later earned a Hockey Canada Level V officiating certification (the highest domestic certification level), and was among a small number of women in Canada to hold that designation at the time.

=== International and professional assignments ===
McKenna joined the IIHF pool of officials in 2017. Her IIHF assignments have included the 2022 IIHF U18 Women's World Championship, including the gold-medal game, and her first senior IIHF tournament at the IIHF Women's World Championship in the Czech Republic.

McKenna has officiated in the Professional Women's Hockey League and was named to the league's 2025–26 officiating roster, wearing uniform #10. She was selected by the IIHF to referee the women's ice hockey tournament at the 2026 Winter Olympics.
