= Élizabeth Mantha =

Canadian ice hockey referee (born 1990)

- Born: August 3, 1990 (age 36); Longueuil, Quebec, Canada
- Education: Bachelor's degree (three certificates: criminology, law, industrial relations)
- Alma mater: Université de Montréal
- Occupation: Ice hockey referee

Élizabeth Mantha (born August 3, 1990) is a Canadian ice hockey referee who has officiated in North American professional leagues and at International Ice Hockey Federation events. She refereed women's ice hockey at the 2022 Winter Olympics and was selected by the IIHF to officiate at the 2026 Winter Olympics. She became one of the first women hired as an American Hockey League (AHL) referee in 2021, and was later named to the officiating team of the Professional Women's Hockey League (PWHL).

== Personal life and education ==
Mantha was born on August 3, 1990, in Longueuil, Quebec. She played U Sports women's ice hockey at the Université de Montréal with the Carabins from 2011 to 2015. She earned a bachelor's degree by completing three certificates in criminology, law, and industrial relations. She has worked as a supervisor at Montréal's 911 emergency dispatch.

== Ice hockey career ==
=== Playing career ===
A defenceman, Mantha was named to the CIS championship all-star team in 2012 and won the CIS championship with the Carabins in 2013.

=== Officiating career ===
Mantha began officiating while she was in high school and university, initially to earn money while playing, and continued after her playing career ended.

In the 2021–22 season, she became one of the first women to officiate in the AHL, and made her AHL on-ice debut on October 29, 2021, in Laval, Quebec. In January 2022, the Quebec Maritimes Junior Hockey League announced that Mantha would join its officiating staff, becoming the league's first woman to officiate a regular-season game.

Mantha refereed women's ice hockey at the 2022 Winter Olympics in Beijing. In August 2025, Hockey Canada announced she had been selected by the IIHF to officiate at the 2026 Winter Olympics in Milan and Cortina d'Ampezzo.

Mantha has officiated in the PWHL since the league's inaugural 2024–25 season, wearing uniform number 15.
