= Cianna Murray =

Canadian ice hockey referee (born 1994)

- Born: August 13, 1994 (age 31); Saskatoon, Saskatchewan, Canada
- Education: BHKin (2017), BEd (2018)
- Alma mater: University of Saskatchewan
- Occupations: Ice hockey referee, schoolteacher

Cianna Murray (née Lieffers; born August 13, 1994) is a Canadian ice hockey referee in North American professional leagues and at International Ice Hockey Federation events. She refereed women's hockey at the Winter Olympics in 2022 and 2026; and worked five consecutive Women's World Championship since 2021, including the gold-medal game in 2024. She became an American Hockey League official in 2022, and a Professional Women's Hockey League official in 2024. She was one of the first females to work in the Saskatchewan Junior Hockey League, the second Western Hockey League female referee, and the first in Centennial Cup history.

== Personal life and education ==
Born Cianna Lieffers on August 13, 1994, in Saskatoon, Saskatchewan, she grew up in Cudworth as the only girl playing on her minor ice hockey team. As the middle child with two brothers, she was given the same sporting opportunities as her siblings. Moving to Saskatoon after finishing high school, she earned Bachelor of Human Kinetics (2017) and Bachelor of Education (2018) degrees at University of Saskatchewan. She taught physical education at a Saskatoon high school, then later taught at elementary schools in Warman, and Asquith. She married Troy Murray in 2025.

== Ice hockey career ==
Murray first became an ice hockey official at age 12, following her older brother. She often officiated the early weeknight game, then played in the late game. She quit officiating after one season following a confrontation with a verbally abusive coach, then returned after one season as encouraged by her mother. Murray progressed through the levels of the Prince Albert Minor Hockey Association, receiving the Kenneth R. Stiles Memorial Scholarship.

During high school, Murray officiated in games for boys her own age. Within a year, she progressed to working in the Saskatchewan Male U18 AAA Hockey League and the Prairie Junior Hockey League. When moving to Saskatoon after high school, she became passionate about officiating with more opportunity in a bigger city. In 2013, she was assigned to her first National Women's Under-18 Championship. She also officiated at the Esso Cup and Canada Winter Games, and worked Saskatchewan Huskies men's and women's hockey games. In 2014, she officiated one of the longest Canadian university hockey games played, a match that included four overtime periods.

In 2016, Murray began working as a linesperson in the Saskatchewan Junior Hockey League (SJHL). As one of the first females to work in the league, she recalled that when arriving at the arena's entrance for players and officials, she was once "told to go around to the front with the rest of the ticket-buying public". According to Murray, the Saskatchewan Hockey Association began a development program for its officials in 2017. In the same year, she became the third female official to earn a Hockey Canada level five certification. She obtained an International Ice Hockey Federation certification to referee internationally in 2017, after previously working the 2018 Winter Olympics qualification tournament in Mexico City as a linesperson in 2016.

Murray officiated her first international event in Canada when Saskatoon hosted the 2018 4 Nations Cup, and refereed at the 2019 U18 Women's World Championship in Scotland. In 2019, she transitioned from a linesperson to referee in the SJHL, and was part of the first all-female officiating crew in the Saskatchewan Male U18 AAA Hockey League. On February 3, 2019, she was one of four female officials to work a game between the Moose Jaw Generals and the Yorkton Maulers. To have four female officials work the same game was a goal of their mentor, Jason Mercer, a former police officer who had died before the goal was realized.

=== 2020 to present ===
At the 2020 Winter Youth Olympics in Switzerland, Murray refereed 11 preliminary round games, a semifinal game, and the gold-medal game. The event was the first three-on-three tournament using a two-referee system. She was chosen to officiate at the 2020 Women's World Championship in France which was cancelled due to COVID-19 pandemic. Scheduled to work the 2021 Women's World Championship in Halifax, the event was postponed until later in the year in Calgary. Her first Women's World Championship assignment was the debut of Hungary national team in the top division. She also worked the semifinal between the United States national team and Finland national team.

Murray refereed in the 2022 Winter Olympics qualification tournament in Germany in 2021. One of three Canadian referees in women's hockey at the 2022 Winter Olympics in China, Murray refereed five preliminary round games, one quarterfinal game, and one semifinal game. During the preliminary round game between the United States and the Canada national team, she departed bleeding when accidentally struck in the face by the stick of Amanda Kessel. After treatment by the Canadian team's medical staff, Murray returned to complete the game with a bandage between her nose and upper lip.

Murray refereed at the 2022 Women's World Championship in Denmark, and the 2023 Women's World Championship in Canada. She participated in the National Hockey League officiating combine in 2022, was added to the American Hockey League list of officials for the 2022–23 season.

On October 24, 2023, Murray became the second female to referee in the Western Hockey League, when taking charge of a game between the Saskatoon Blades and Moose Jaw Warriors. Murray stated after the game, "the next step from there would be to have our two females work together and maybe one day work towards a full female crew". Later in the same season, Murray refereed at the 2024 Canada-USA Rivalry Series in Saskatoon and Regina, the 2024 U Sports women's championship tournament in Saskatoon, and the gold-medal game of the 2024 Women's World Championship in Utica, New York.

Murray has officiated in the Professional Women's Hockey League since the 2024–25 season, wearing uniform #13. She refereed at the 2025 Women's World Championship in the Czech Republic, her fifth consecutive Women's World Championship. At the 2025 Centennial Cup in Calgary, she became the first female to referee a game in Canada's national junior A championship tournament. In December 2025, she and her husband Troy were refereeing partners in a WHL game at the SaskTel Centre.

Selected to referee in women's hockey at the 2026 Winter Olympics in Italy, she worked the final Olympic qualification tournament in Sweden in February 2025. She refereed three group games at the Olympics, the semifinal game between Sweden and the United States, and the gold medal game between Canada and the United States. (Note: Assignments at the 2026 Winter Olympics: Group A: USA versus Czechia.; Group A: Czechia versus Finland.; Group B: Italy versus Germany.; Semifinal: USA versus Sweden.; Gold medal game: USA versus Canada.) Prior to the 2026 Winter Olympics, she refereed five games at the 2026 World Junior Ice Hockey Championships – Division I in Milan. (Note: Division I B assignments at the 2026 World Junior Ice Hockey Championships: Poland versus Italy.; Japan versus Poland.; Hungary versus Poland.; Italy versus Hungary.; Hungary versus Japan.)

== Development as an official ==
Murray quickly developed the ability to withstand criticism and verbal abuse while officiating, and participants not knowing what to expect from a female refereeing male players much taller than herself. She felt that officiating "teaches you confidence, leadership, communication and how to handle pressure", and that "being a referee has made me a better teacher, and vice versa".

As part of the Saskatchewan Minor Hockey Association referee committee, she mentors and instructs courses to develop younger officials. Inspired to improve her refereeing talents by the "tenacity" of the Humboldt Broncos in rebuilding after the 2018 bus crash, she stated the team's "spirit of resilience made a profound impression". Since 2021, she has "made it [a] personal goal to pave the way or to make it easier for that next female".
