= Andrea Trnková =

Czech ice hockey player (born 2004)

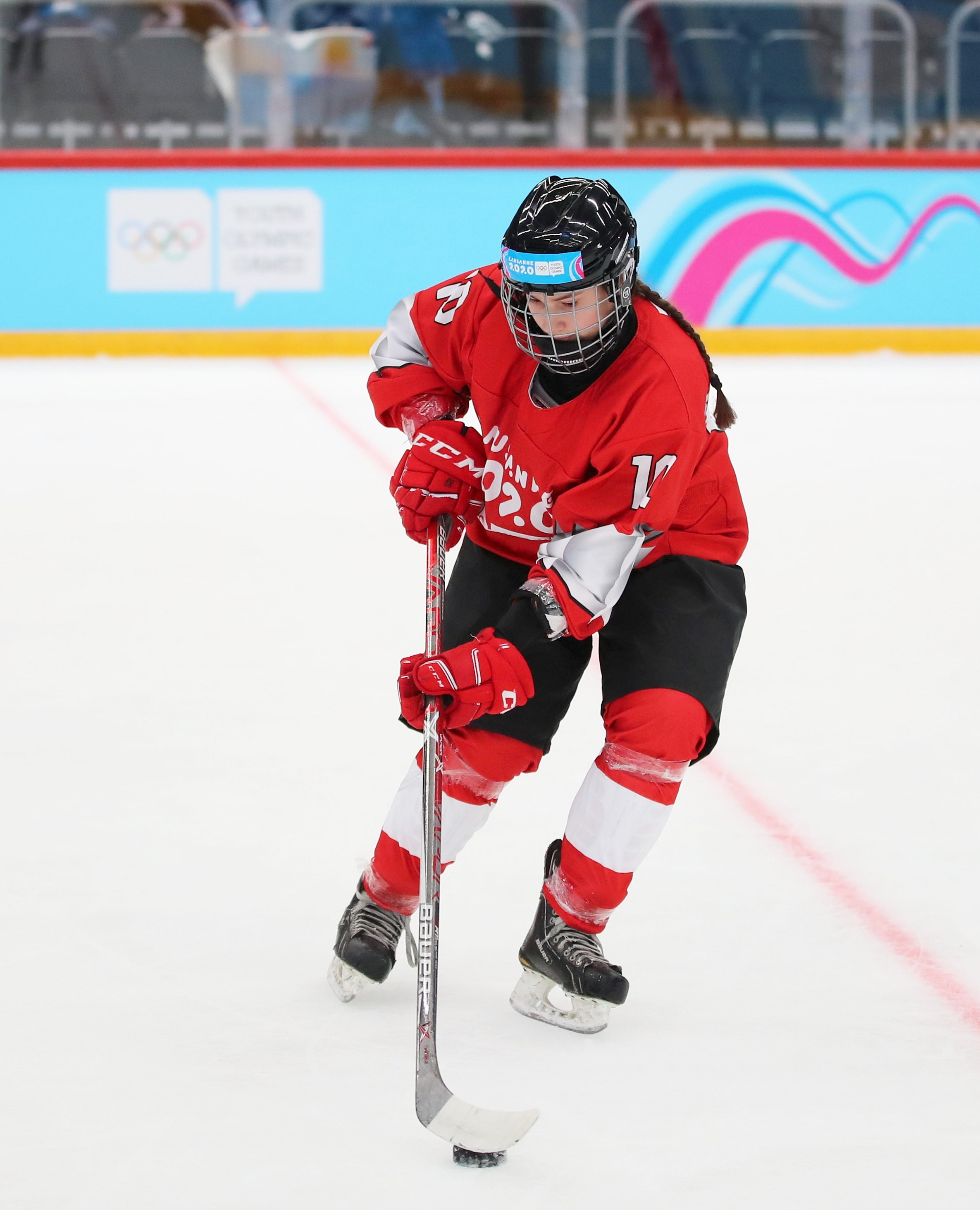
- Trnková at the 2020 Winter Youth Olympics
- Born: 3 March 2002 (age 24) Ústí nad Orlicí, Czech Republic
- Height: 175 cm (5 ft 9 in)
- Weight: 72 kg (159 lb; 11 st 5 lb)
- Position: Defence
- Shoots: Left
- NCAA team Former teams: RPI; HC Příbram
- National team: Czech Republic
- Playing career: 2020–present
Medal record
Women's ice hockey
IIHF World Championship
Bronze medal – third place	2022 Denmark
Bronze medal – third place	2023 Canada

Andrea Trnková (born 3 March 2004) is a Czech ice hockey player for RPI and a member of the Czech Republic women's national ice hockey team.

== Playing career ==
Trnková began her collegiate career for RPI during the 2023–24 season. During her freshman year, she recorded five goals and 17 assists in 30 games, and was named to the ECAC Hockey All-Rookie Team. During the 2024–25 season, in her sophomore year, she recorded eight goals and nine assists in 31 games, and was named to the All-ECAC Hockey Third Team.

== International play ==
She represented Czech Republic at the 2020 Winter Youth Olympics where she served as flag bearer.

On 20 March 2023, she was selected to represent the Czech Republic at the 2022 IIHF Women's World Championship, where she made her senior national team debut. During the tournament she recorded two assists in seven games and won a bronze medal. She again represented her country at the 2023 IIHF Women's World Championship, where she was scoreless in seven games and won a bronze medal. She again represented her country at the 2024 IIHF Women's World Championship, where she was scoreless in seven games.

== Career statistics ==
=== Regular season and playoffs ===
			Regular season					Playoffs
Season	Team	League	GP	G	A	Pts	PIM	GP	G	A	Pts	PIM
2023–24	RPI	ECAC	30	5	17	22	42	—	—	—	—	—
2024–25	RPI	ECAC	31	8	9	17	59	—	—	—	—	—
NCAA totals			61	13	26	39	101	—	—	—	—	—

=== International ===
Year	Team	Event	Result	GP	G	A	Pts	PIM
2022	Czech Republic	U18	5th	5	1	3	4	2
2022	Czech Republic	WC	3rd place, bronze medalist(s)	7	0	2	2	8
2023	Czech Republic	WC	3rd place, bronze medalist(s)	7	0	0	0	2
2024	Czech Republic	WC	4th	7	0	0	0	4
2025	Czech Republic	WC	4th	6	0	2	2	4
2026	Czech Republic	OG	5th	5	0	1	1	4
Junior totals				5	1	3	4	2
Senior totals				32	0	5	5	22

== Awards and honors ==
Award	Year
College
All-ECAC Rookie Team	2024
All-ECAC Third Team	2025
