= Ivana Wey =

Swiss ice hockey player (born 2006)

- Born: 4 February 2006 (age 20) Rickenbach, Lucerne, Switzerland
- Height: 1.72 m (5 ft 8 in)
- Weight: 67 kg (148 lb; 10 st 8 lb)
- Position: Forward
- Shoots: Left
- NCAA team Former teams: Northeastern Huskies; EV Zug
- National team: Switzerland
- Playing career: 2019–present
Medal record
Olympic Games
Bronze medal – third place	2026 Milano Cortina	Team

Ivana Wey (born 4 February 2006) is a Swiss ice hockey player. She is a member of the Switzerland women's national ice hockey team that participated in women's ice hockey tournament at the 2026 Winter Olympics, winning a bronze medal.

== Playing career ==
During the 2023–24 season, Wey recorded 31 goals and 79 points in 15 games for EV Zug.

=== International ===
Making her Olympic debut on 6 February 2026, she earned an assist on Alina Muller's power play goal. In the eighth round of the shootout, Wey scored the winning goal as Switzerland prevailed in a 4–3 final.

In the bronze medal game of the 2026 Winter Olympics, versus Sweden, Wey logged an assist on the game-winning goal, as Switzerland went on to prevail in a 2-1 overtime win.
