= Naemi Herzig =

Swiss ice hockey player (born 2007)

- Born: 21 March 2007 (age 19) St. Gallen, Switzerland
- Height: 1.70 m (5 ft 7 in)
- Weight: 68 kg (150 lb; 10 st 10 lb)
- Position: Forward
- Shoots: Left
- HEA team Former teams: Holy Cross Crusaders; EV Zug
- National team: Switzerland
- Playing career: 2018–present
Medal record
Olympic Games
Bronze medal – third place	2026 Milano Cortina	Team

Naemi Herzig (born 21 March 2007) is a Swiss ice hockey player. She is a member of the Switzerland women's national ice hockey team that participated in women's ice hockey tournament at the 2026 Winter Olympics.

== Playing career ==
=== College ===
Herzig currently plays college ice hockey with the Holy Cross Crusaders women's ice hockey program in the Hockey East (HEA) conference of the NCAA Division I.

Wearing number 77, she made her debut with Holy Cross on 26 September 2025, versus RPI, earning an assist on a second period goal by Lulu Rourke. Herzig's first goal took place on 17 October 2025, versus Dartmouth. At the 2:06 mark of the second period, she scored on Michaela Hesova, as Holy Cross won in a 3–2 final.

== Awards and honours ==
- Hockey East Rookie of the Week (awarded 19 January 2026)
