= Bachelor of Human Kinetics =

A Bachelor of Human Kinetics (BHk or BHKin) or Bachelor of Science in Human Kinetics (BScHK) is a four-year academic degree awarded by a university upon the completion of a program of study in human kinetics. Specializations within this degree may include: athletic therapy, kinesiology, physical education, recreation, and sport management.
