= Fiera Milano =

Fairground in Milan, Italy

Fiera Milano SpA
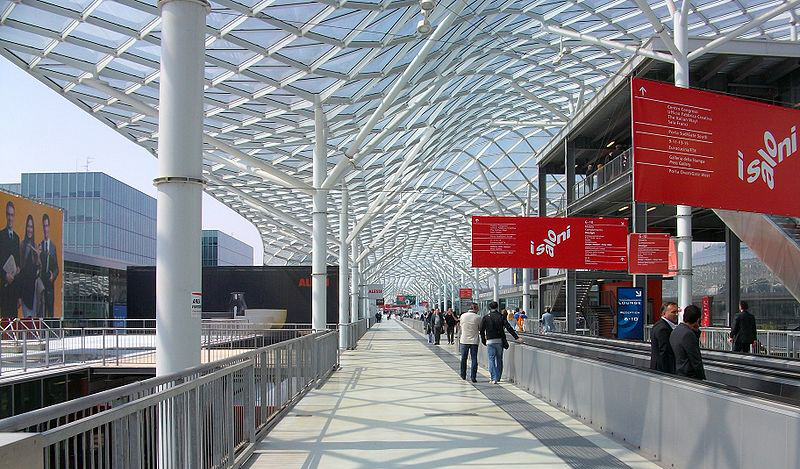
- Type: Società per Azioni
- Industry: Trade fair; Exhibition organiser
- Founded: 1 October 2000; 25 years ago
- Headquarters: Piazzale Carlo Magno 1 - 20149, Milan, Italy
- Area served: Northern Italy
- Revenue: €248.358 million (2010)
- Net income: €2.074 million (2010)
- Number of employees: 740 (June 2011)
- Website: fieramilano.it

Fiera Milano SpA is a trade fair and exhibition organiser headquartered in Milan. The firm is the most important trade fair organiser in Italy and the world's fourth largest.

The company started operation on 1 October 2000 and has been listed on Borsa Italiana (STAR segment) since 12 December 2002.

Fiera Milano mainly operates in the fields of management and organisation of exhibitions, trade fairs and conferences. It hosts about seventy shows (of which about one-third are directly organized) and 30,000 exhibitors every year. It was involved in the Expo 2015 which took place around the grounds of the Fiera Milano Rho.

== Fiera Milano Rho ==
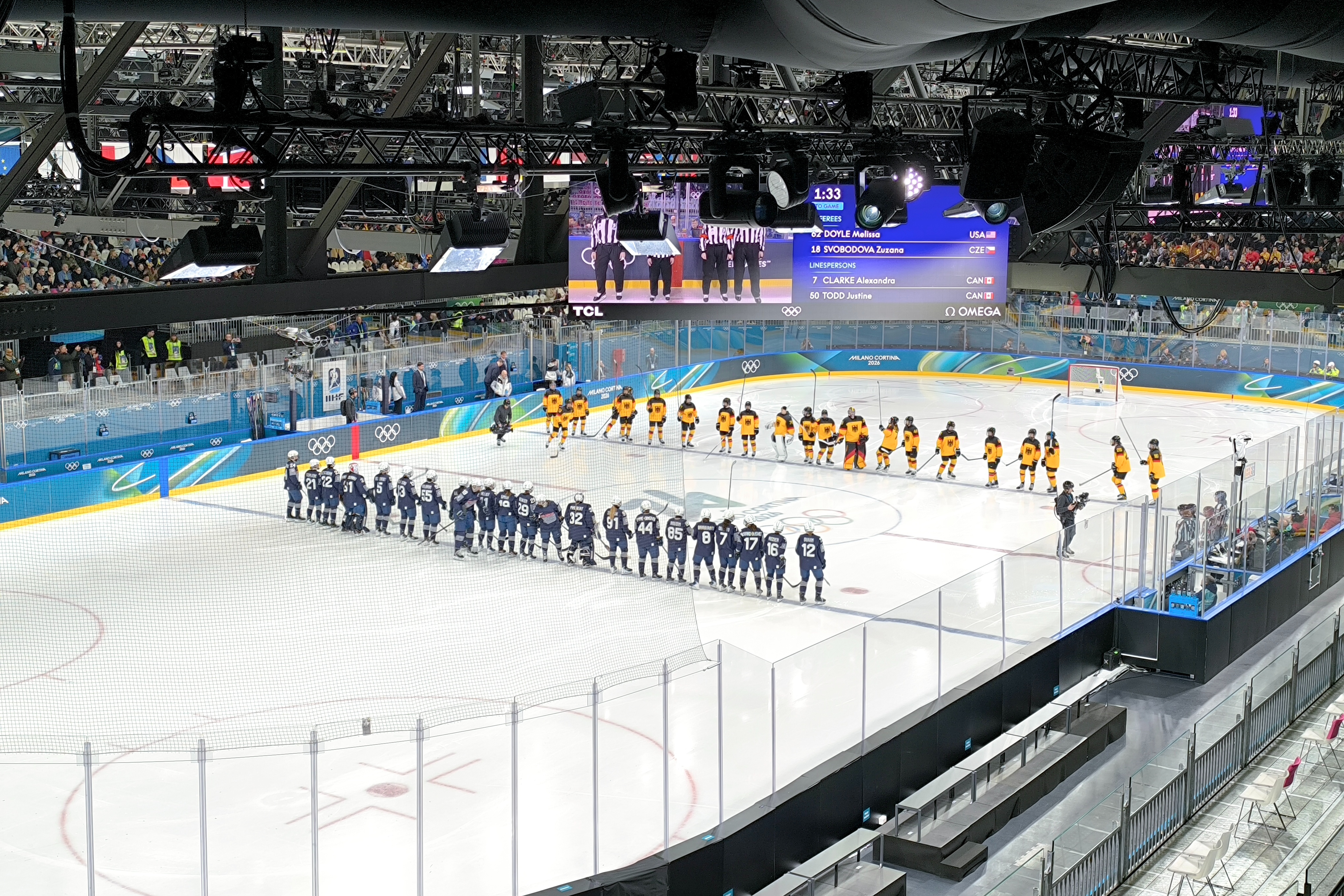
The ice hockey rink during the 2026 Winter Olympics

Fiera Milano Rho, opened in 2005, is a fairground complex designed by architect Massimiliano Fuksas, located in an area on the border between the towns of Rho and Pero replacing the former grounds which were developed into the new CityLife district of Milan. The Fiera Milano Rho location is mainly used for industrial trade shows.

The Fiera Milano Rho complex was announced as the new speed skating venue of the 2026 Winter Olympics on 19 April 2023 after initial plans to put a roof over Ice Rink Piné had been rejected by the IOC. The event was hosted at Halls 13 and 15, from which a single space was created to house a speed skating rink, with seating for 6,500. The venue also hosted the secondary ice hockey rink.

== Fiera Milano City ==
fieramilanocity
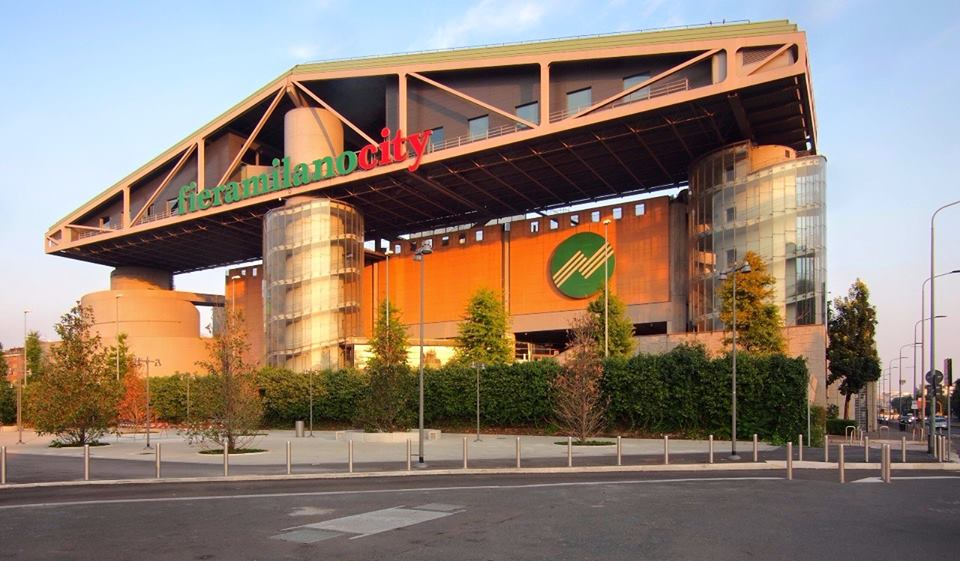
- Former names: Fiera Campionaria
- Location: Milan, Italy
- Operator: Fiera Milano

Construction
- Opened: 1923
- Expanded: 1997

Website
- FieraMilano page

The Fiera Milano City location mostly houses consumer trade shows such as the Milan Fashion Week.

== MiCo ==
MiCo (Milano Congressi) is currently the largest congress center in Europe, with a capacity of up to 18,000 in 70 different conference rooms.
