= 2026 IIHF Women's Asia Championship =

Tournament details
- Host country: Kazakhstan
- City: Oskemen
- Venue: 1 (in 1 host city)
- Dates: 5–8 November 2025
- Teams: 4

Final positions
- Champions: Japan (2nd title)
- Runners-up: China
- Third place: Kazakhstan
- Fourth place: South Korea

Tournament statistics
- Games played: 6
- Goals scored: 32 (5.33 per game)
- Attendance: 5,449 (908 per game)
- Scoring leader: (Japan) Haruka Toko (6 points)

Official website
- IIHF

The 2026 IIHF Women's Asia Championship was the second edition of the IIHF Asia Championship Series, organised by the International Ice Hockey Federation (IIHF). It was held in Oskemen, Kazakhstan from 5 to 8 November 2025.

Japan won the tournament for the second time.

== Standings ==
Pos	Team	Pld	W	OTW	OTL	L	GF	GA	GD	Pts
1st place, gold medalist(s)	Japan	3	3	0	0	0	17	0	+17	9
2nd place, silver medalist(s)	China	3	1	1	0	1	9	6	+3	5
3rd place, bronze medalist(s)	Kazakhstan (H)	3	1	0	0	2	3	13	−10	3
4	South Korea	3	0	0	1	2	3	13	−10	1

Source: IIHF
Rules for classification: 1) points; 2) head-to-head points; 3) head-to-head goal difference; 4) head-to-head number of goals scored; 5) result against closest best-ranked team outside tied teams; 6) result against second-best ranked team outside tied teams; 7) seeding before tournament.
(H) Host

== Results ==
All times are local (UTC+5).

5 November 2025; 16:00	China	3–2 GWS (0–1, 1–1, 1–0) (OT: 0–0) (SO: 1–0)	South Korea	Boris Alexandrov Sports Palace, Oskemen; Attendance: 456

Game reference

Lai Guimin
Goalies
Ahn Se-won
Referees:
(China) Liu Lu
(South Korea) Ma Sang-hee
Linesmen:
(Kazakhstan) Dilyara Akramova
(Kazakhstan) Elvira Dairova

	0–1	05:19 – Lee S. (Park Ji., Park Jo.) (PP)
	0–2	36:51 – Han S. (Song, Kim M.)
Zhao – 37:43	1–2
Li K. (Zhao, Zhang B.) (EA) – 59:24	2–2

Zhang B. (miss)
Tian B.
Wang Y.
Wu S. (miss)
Wang J. (miss)
Shootout
(miss) Han Y.
(miss) Park Jo.
Song
(miss) Lee S.
(miss) Han S.
6 min
Penalties
6 min
51
Shots
19

5 November 2025; 19:30	Kazakhstan	0–6 (0–2, 0–3, 0–1)	Japan	Boris Alexandrov Sports Palace, Oskemen; Attendance: 1,235

Game reference

Arina Chshyokolova
Goalies
Miyuu Masuhara
Referees:
(Kazakhstan) Irina Mogilnikova
(Japan) Miyuki Nakayama
Linesmen:
(Japan) Kumiko Matsuo
(China) Zhang Wenxi

0–1	07:55 – Ito (Toko)
0–2	15:29 – Kurosu (Sato, Kamada)
0–3	20:48 – Rir. Noro (Yamashita, Wajima)
0–4	24:47 – Miura (Toko, Ito)
0–5	36:46 – Toko (Rio Noro) (PP)
0–6	40:59 – Tomiuchi (Wajima, Maeda)

4 min
Penalties
6 min
14
Shots
71

7 November 2025; 14:00	Japan	7–0 (4–0, 2–0, 1–0)	South Korea	Boris Alexandrov Sports Palace, Oskemen; Attendance: 258

Game reference

Kiku Kobayashi
Goalies
Jo Soo-yeon
Ahn Se-won
Referees:
(Kazakhstan) Irina Mogilnikova
(China) Song Meina
Linesmen:
(Kazakhstan) Elvira Dairova
(South Korea) Park Jung-yoon

Wajima (Rir. Noro, Seki) – 04:16	1–0
Rio Noro (Toko, Miura) (PP) – 07:58	2–0
Rir. Noro (Ak. Shiga, Sato) (PP) – 13:24	3–0
Rir. Noro (Wajima, Seki) – 16:16	4–0
Ukita (Ak. Shiga, Ao. Shiga) – 26:05	5–0
Kurosu (Okumura, Tomiuchi) – 38:20	6–0
Toko (PP) – 41:36	7–0

2 min
Penalties
8 min
52
Shots
7

7 November 2025; 17:30	China	6–0 (1–0, 2–0, 3–0)	Kazakhstan	Boris Alexandrov Sports Palace, Oskemen; Attendance: 1,155

Game reference

Lai Guimin
Goalies
Arina Chshyokolova
Referees:
(South Korea) Ma Sang-hee
(Japan) Miyuki Nakayama
Linesmen:
(Kazakhstan) Dilyara Akramova
(China) Zhang Wenxi

Yang – 07:28	1–0
Zhang B. (Li K.) – 34:06	2–0
Yue (Gao) – 39:50	3–0
Wang Y. (Zhao) (PP) – 44:29	4–0
Han (Zhao, Zhang B.) (PP) – 47:30	5–0
Tian (Li W., Yang J.) (PP) – 51:42	6–0

2 min
Penalties
9 min
35
Shots
33

8 November 2025; 14:00	Japan	4–0 (1–0, 2–0, 1–0)	China	Boris Alexandrov Sports Palace, Oskemen; Attendance: 425

Game reference

Miyuu Masuhara
Goalies
Lai Guimin
Referees:
(South Korea) Ma Sang-hee
(Japan) Miyuki Nakayama
Linesmen:
(Kazakhstan) Dilyara Akramova
(China) Zhang Wenxi

Wajima (Maeda) – 13:43	1–0
Ukita (Ao. Shiga, Rio Noro) – 20:09	2–0
Rio Noro (Toko, Ukita) – 38:06	3–0
Ak. Shiga (Rio Noro) – 48:24	4–0

6 min
Penalties
6 min
64
Shots
11

8 November 2025; 17:30	South Korea	1–3 (1–2, 0–0, 0–1)	Kazakhstan	Boris Alexandrov Sports Palace, Oskemen; Attendance: 1,920

Game reference

Ahn Se-won
Goalies
Arina Chshyokolova
Referees:
(China) Liu Lu
(China) Song Meina
Linesmen:
(Japan) Kumiko Matsuo
(South Korea) Park Jung-yoon

	0–1	00:52 – Ashimova (Aldabergenova)
Park Ji. (Ahn) – 02:24	1–1
	1–2	13:12 – Orazbayeva (Moldabay) (PP)
	1–3	59:49 – Zubkova (EN)

6 min
Penalties
6 min
33
Shots
28

== Awards and statistics ==
=== Awards ===
Best players selected by the directorate

Position	Player
Goaltender	(China) Lai Guimin
Defender	(Kazakhstan) Madina Tursynova
Forward	(Japan) Haruka Toko

Source: IIHF

Best player of each team selected by coaches

Team	Player
China	Zhao Qinan
Japan	Haruka Toko
Kazakhstan	Arina Chshyokolova
South Korea	Park Jong-ah

Source: IIHF

=== Scoring leaders ===
List shows the top-ten scorers, sorted by points, then goals.

GP = Games played; G = Goals; A = Assists; Pts = Points; PIM = Penalties in minutes; +/− = Plus/minus; POS = Position

Rank		Player	GP	G	A	Pts	PIM	+/−	POS
1	(Japan)	Haruka Toko	3	2	4	6	0	+4	F
2	(Japan)	Rio Noro	3	2	3	5	0	+4	F
2	(Japan)	Yumeka Wajima	3	2	3	5	0	+5	F
4	(Japan)	Riri Noro	3	3	1	4	2	+3	F
5	(China)	Zhao Qinan	3	1	3	4	0	+1	D
6	(Japan)	Rui Ukita	3	2	1	3	0	+3	F
7	(Japan)	Akane Shiga	3	1	2	3	2	+3	F
7	(China)	Zhang Biyang	3	1	2	3	0	–1	F
9	(Japan)	Wakana Kurosu	3	2	0	2	2	+2	F
10	(Japan)	Makoto Ito	3	1	1	2	0	+2	F
10	(China)	Li Ke	3	1	1	2	0	–1	F
10	(Japan)	Mei Miura	3	1	1	2	0	+2	F
10	(South Korea)	Park Ji-yoon	3	1	1	2	2	–3	F
10	(Japan)	Ayaka Tomiuchi	3	1	1	2	0	+6	D
10	(China)	Yang Jinglei	3	1	1	2	0	+2	F

Pernesh Ashimova, Anastassiya Orazbayeva, and Sofiya Zubkova tied as the leading scorers for Kazakhstan, having each scored one goal for one point in three games played. They ranked twentieth on the list of tournament scoring leaders. None of the three forwards recorded any penalty minutes during the tournament. Ashimova was –2 and both Orazbayeva and Zubkova were –3.

=== Goaltenders ===
Goaltenders playing at least forty percent of their team's minutes are included in this list, sorted by save percentage.

TOI = Time on ice (minutes:seconds); SOG = Shots on goal; GA = Goals against; Sv% = Save percentage; GAA = Goals against average; SO = Shutouts

Rank		Player	TOI	SOG	GA	Sv%	GAA	SO
1	(Japan)	Miyuu Masuhara	120:00	25	0	100.00	0.00	2
2	(China)	Lai Guimin	184:56	116	6	94.83	1.95	1
3	(South Korea)	Ahn Se-won	143:57	87	5	94.25	2.08	0
4	(Kazakhstan)	Arina Chshyokolova	180:00	139	13	90.65	4.33	0

== Rosters ==
Rank	Team	Roster
1	Japan	Goaltenders: Kiku Kobayashi, Miyuu Masuhara; Defencemen: Natsuki Okumura, Kohane Sato, Kanami Seki, Aoi Shiga, Ayaka Tomiuchi, Shiori Yamashita; Forwards: Makoto Ito, Minami Kamada, Wakana Kurosu, Suzuka Maeda, Mei Miura, Rio Noro, Riri Noro, Akane Shiga, Haruka Toko, Rui Ukita, Yumeka Wajima; Head coach: Yuji Iizuka; Assistant coaches: Yujiro Nakajimaya, Masahito Haruna (goaltender)
2	China	Goaltenders: Ju Sihan, Lai Guimin, Li Yiming; Defencemen: Du Sijia, Li Qianhua, Li Wenjia, Tian Yuwei, Wu Xi, Yue Wenxiao, Zhang Shuqi, Zhao Qinan; Forwards: Fu Ruining, Gao Ziye, Han Xiang, Li Ke, Tian Boya, Wang Jiaxin, Wang Yifan, Wu Dingwen, Wu Sijia, Yang Jinglei, Zhang Anna, Zhang Biyang; Head coach: Wang Dahai; Assistant coaches: Zhang Jing, Xie Ming (goaltender), Chao Yafei (video)
3	Kazakhstan	Goaltenders: Veronika Ageyeva, Arina Chshyokolova, Polina Govtva; Defencemen: Yuliya Butorina, Katrin Meskini, Dariya Moldabay, Aida Olzhabayeva, Anna Pyatkova, Madina Tursynova, Alexandra Voronova, Polina Yakovleva; Forwards: Malika Aldabergenova, Pernesh Ashimova, Nadezhda Filimonova, Yekaterina Kutsenko, Sofiya Muravyeva, Madianna Nussupova, Anastassiya Orazbayeva, Dilnaz Sayakhatkyzy, Munira Sayakhatkyzy, Alexandra Shegay, Larissa Sviridova, Sofiya Zubkova; Head coach: Alexandr Tebenkov; Assistant coaches: Zhassulan Orazbayev, Darya Dmitriyeva (goaltender)
4	South Korea	Goaltenders: Ahn Se-won, Jo Soo-yeon, Kim Yeon-ju; Defencemen: Han Soo-jin, Kim Min-seo, Kim Sa-rang, Kim Se-lin, Lee So-jung, Park Ye-eun; Forwards: Han Yu-an, Jung Si-yun, Kang Nara, Lee Eun-ji, Na Se-young, Park Ji-yoon, Park Jong-ah, Park Minae, Song Yun-ha; Head coach: Kim Do-yun; Assistant coaches: Kim Tae-gyum, Lee Ji-sub (goaltender), Kim Sang-won (video)
