= 2027 IIHF Women's Asia Championship =

Tournament details
- Host country: Japan
- City: Sapporo
- Venue: 1 (in 1 host city)
- Dates: 15–18 October 2026
- Teams: 4

Final positions
- Champions: Japan (3rd title)
- Runners-up: China
- Third place: Kazakhstan
- Fourth place: South Korea

Tournament statistics
- Games played: 6
- Goals scored: 26 (4.33 per game)
- Attendance: 2,854 (476 per game)
- Scoring leader: (Japan) Yumeka Wajima (7 points)

Official website
- IIHF.com

The 2027 IIHF Women's Asia Championship was the third edition of the IIHF Asia Championship Series, organized by the International Ice Hockey Federation (IIHF). It was held in Sapporo, Japan from 15 to 18 October 2026.

Japan won their third title in as many editions.

== Standings ==
Pos	Team	Pld	W	OTW	OTL	L	GF	GA	GD	Pts
1st place, gold medalist(s)	Japan (H)	3	3	0	0	0	15	0	+15	9
2nd place, silver medalist(s)	China	3	2	0	0	1	4	7	−3	6
3rd place, bronze medalist(s)	Kazakhstan	3	1	0	0	2	6	7	−1	3
4	South Korea	3	0	0	0	3	1	12	−11	0

Source: IIHF
Rules for classification: 1) points; 2) head-to-head points; 3) head-to-head goal difference; 4) head-to-head number of goals scored; 5) result against closest best-ranked team outside tied teams; 6) result against second-best ranked team outside tied teams; 7) seeding before tournament.
(H) Host

== Results ==
All times are local (UTC+9).

15 October 2026; 15:00	China	2–0 (0–0, 1–0, 1–0)	South Korea	Tsukisamu Gymnasium, Sapporo; Attendance: 119

Game reference
Lai Guimin	Goalies	Cheon Hyo-seo	Referees: (South Korea) Ma Sang-hee (China) Song Meina; Linesmen: (Kazakhstan) Elvira Dairova (South Korea) Park Jung-yoon
Zhao Z. (Fu, Gao) – 34:14 / 1–0; Tian (Zhao Z., Gao) – 41:58 / 2–0			Referees: (South Korea) Ma Sang-hee (China) Song Meina; Linesmen: (Kazakhstan) Elvira Dairova (South Korea) Park Jung-yoon
4 min	Penalties	2 min	Referees: (South Korea) Ma Sang-hee (China) Song Meina; Linesmen: (Kazakhstan) Elvira Dairova (South Korea) Park Jung-yoon
27	Shots	23	Referees: (South Korea) Ma Sang-hee (China) Song Meina; Linesmen: (Kazakhstan) Elvira Dairova (South Korea) Park Jung-yoon

15 October 2026; 18:30	Kazakhstan	0–4 (0–2, 0–0, 0–2)	Japan	Tsukisamu Gymnasium, Sapporo; Attendance: 442

Game reference

Arina Chshyokolova
Goalies
Riko Kawaguchi
Referees:
(Switzerland) Mariko Dale
(China) Fu Zhennan
Linesmen:
(Kazakhstan) Dilyara Akramova
(Netherlands) Amy Keijzers

0–1	00:23 – Sato (Wajima, Shiga)
0–2	02:12 – Sone (Lack, Yamashita)
0–3	43:58 – Wajima (Shiga)
0–4	46:33 – Yamashita (Sone, Lack)

4 min
Penalties
8 min
8
Shots
57

17 October 2026; 12:00	China	2–1 (1–1, 0–0, 1–0)	Kazakhstan	Tsukisamu Gymnasium, Sapporo; Attendance: 179

Game reference

Lai Guimin
Goalies
Arina Chshyokolova
Referees:
(Switzerland) Mariko Dale
(Japan) Mai Mizuhori
Linesmen:
(Kazakhstan) Elvira Dairova
(Netherlands) Amy Keijzers

Gao (Zhao Z., Yang) – 07:19	1–0
	1–1	15:49 – Zubkova (Aldabergenova, Tursynova)
Fu (Chen, Han) – 43:30	2–1

8 min
Penalties
0 min
30
Shots
24

17 October 2026; 15:30	Japan	5–0 (1–0, 2–0, 2–0)	South Korea	Tsukisamu Gymnasium, Sapporo; Attendance: 681

Game reference

Haruka Kuromaru
Goalies
Cheon Hyo-seo
Referees:
(China) Fu Zhennan
(China) Song Meina
Linesmen:
(Kazakhstan) Dilyara Akramova
(China) Zhang Wenxi

Kurosu (Shinoda, Yamashita) – 05:19	1–0
Koyama (Wajima, Sato) – 21:58	2–0
Nagaoka (Tada) – 23:13	3–0
Nagaoka (Wajima, Seki) – 50:05	4–0
Tada (Nagaoka, Sato) (PP) – 50:29	5–0

2 min
Penalties
4 min
37
Shots
15

18 October 2026; 12:00	South Korea	1–5 (0–1, 0–2, 1–2)	Kazakhstan	Tsukisamu Gymnasium, Sapporo; Attendance: 173

Game reference

Cheon Hyo-seo
Goalies
Arina Chshyokolova
Referees:
(South Korea) Ma Sang-hee
(Japan) Mai Mizuhori
Linesmen:
(South Korea) Park Jung-yoon
(China) Zhang Wenxi

	0–1	03:28 – Zubkova (Olzhabayeva) (PP)
	0–2	33:25 – Olzhabayeva (Muravyeva)
	0–3	36:31 – Ashimova (Meskini, Aldabergenova)
	0–4	41:11 – Aldabergenova (Moldabay, Butorina) (PP)
	0–5	50:06 – Muravyeva (Moldabay, Tursynova)
Kim Se. (Park Jo., Park Ji.) (PP) – 58:33	1–5

8 min
Penalties
2 min
25
Shots
16

18 October 2026; 15:30	Japan	6–0 (1–0, 2–0, 3–0)	China	Tsukisamu Gymnasium, Sapporo; Attendance: 1,260

Game reference

Riko Kawaguchi
Goalies
Lai Guimin
Referees:
(Switzerland) Mariko Dale
(China) Fu Zhennan
Linesmen:
(Kazakhstan) Dilyara Akramova
(Netherlands) Amy Keijzers

Wajima (Sato) – 16:33	1–0
Sato (Kurosu, Tada) – 36:52	2–0
Wajima (Rio Noro) – 39:26	3–0
Shiga (Rio Noro, Rir. Noro) – 42:55	4–0
Sone (Yamashita, Lack) – 44:48	5–0
Shiga (Rio Noro, Wajima) – 45:25	6–0

8 min
Penalties
6 min
50
Shots
18
