= 2027 IIHF Asia Championship =

Tournament details
- Host country: South Korea
- City: Jeonju
- Venue: 1 (in 1 host city)
- Dates: 5–8 November 2026
- Teams: 4

Final positions
- Champions: Kazakhstan (3rd title)
- Runners-up: Japan
- Third place: South Korea
- Fourth place: China

Tournament statistics
- Games played: 6
- Goals scored: 28 (4.67 per game)
- Attendance: 3,725 (621 per game)
- Scoring leader: (Japan) Chikara Hanzawa (5 points)

Official website
- IIHF.com

The 2027 IIHF Asia Championship was the third edition of the IIHF Asia Championship Series, organized by the International Ice Hockey Federation (IIHF). It was held in Jeonju, South Korea from 5 to 8 November 2026.

Kazakhstan won their third title in as many editions.

== Standings ==
Pos	Team	Pld	W	OTW	OTL	L	GF	GA	GD	Pts
1st place, gold medalist(s)	Kazakhstan	3	2	1	0	0	9	2	+7	8
2nd place, silver medalist(s)	Japan	3	2	0	0	1	11	7	+4	6
3rd place, bronze medalist(s)	South Korea (H)	3	1	0	1	1	6	7	−1	4
4	China	3	0	0	0	3	2	12	−10	0

Source: IIHF
Rules for classification: 1) points; 2) head-to-head points; 3) head-to-head goal difference; 4) head-to-head number of goals scored; 5) result against closest best-ranked team outside tied teams; 6) result against second-best ranked team outside tied teams; 7) seeding before tournament.
(H) Host

== Results ==
All times are local (UTC+9).

5 November 2026; 16:00	Japan	2–3 (1–1, 1–1, 0–1)	Kazakhstan	Jeonju Indoor Ice Rink, Jeonju; Attendance: 300

Game reference

Issa Otsuka
Goalies
Vladislav Nurek
Referees:
(South Korea) Chae Young-jin
(South Korea) Park Jun-soo
Linesmen:
(South Korea) Lim Jun-seo
(China) Xu Hehao

Taneichi (Isogai, Ishida) (PP) – 03:32	1–0
	1–1	04:38 – Mukhametov (Grents)
	1–2	27:11 – Migunov (Merzlikin, Mangisbayev)
Kimura (Ishida) (PP) – 33:40	2–2
	2–3	50:02 – Nikitin (Gatiyatov, Gusseinov) (PP)

8 min
Penalties
6 min
21
Shots
41

5 November 2026; 19:30	South Korea	3–1 (0–0, 1–0, 2–1)	China	Jeonju Indoor Ice Rink, Jeonju; Attendance: 425

Game reference

Chun Jong-hun
Goalies
Chen Shifeng
Referees:
(Japan) Masa Hashimoto
(Kazakhstan) Mihail Stupak
Linesmen:
(South Korea) Kang Kyu-seong
(Kazakhstan) Vyacheslav Zbrodko

Song H. (Kwon H., Lee J.) – 23:52	1–0
	1–1	43:28 – Zhang Z. (Jiang)
Huh (Lee Y., Kwon M.) – 47:46	2–1
Lee C. (Kim G.) (EN) – 59:20	3–1

2 min
Penalties
2 min
48
Shots
15

7 November 2026; 14:00	South Korea	3–5 (0–0, 1–4, 2–1)	Japan	Jeonju Indoor Ice Rink, Jeonju; Attendance: 1,200

Game reference

Lee Yeon-seung
Choi Su-hoon
Goalies
Issa Otsuka
Referees:
(China) Feng Lei
(Kazakhstan) Mihail Stupak
Linesmen:
(China) Xu Hehao
(Kazakhstan) Vyacheslav Zbrodko

	0–1	24:01 – Nakajima (Isogai, Hanzawa)
	0–2	30:27 – Hanzawa (Ishida, Takeya)
	0–3	33:50 – Miura (Taneichi, Okubo)
	0–4	35:00 – Hanzawa (Ishida, Tsutsumi)
Kim Sa. (Kwon M., Kim Se.) (PP) – 38:05	1–4
	1–5	44:30 – Tsutsumi (Suzuki) (PP)
Kim Si. (Lee C., Huh) (PP) – 44:30	2–5
Kim Sa. (Kim G., Jeong) – 58:43	3–5

10 min
Penalties
8 min
25
Shots
19

7 November 2026; 17:30	Kazakhstan	5–0 (0–0, 2–0, 3–0)	China	Jeonju Indoor Ice Rink, Jeonju; Attendance: 300

Game reference

Vladislav Nurek
Sergei Kudryavtsev
Goalies
Chen Shifeng
Referees:
(South Korea) Chae Young-jin
(Japan) Masa Hashimoto
Linesmen:
(South Korea) Kang Kyu-seong
(Japan) Ryoya Yamada

Daniyar (Mukhametov, Gusseinov) (PP) – 30:06	1–0
Daniyar (Butenko, Gatiyatov) – 33:36	2–0
Gatiyatov (Butenko, Daniyar) – 40:33	3–0
Iulbarisov (Mukhametov, Alexandrov) – 47:46	4–0
Nikitin (Gatiyatov, Gusseinov) (PP) – 52:56	5–0

0 min
Penalties
4 min
51
Shots
13

8 November 2026; 14:00	China	1–4 (0–0, 0–1, 1–3)	Japan	Jeonju Indoor Ice Rink, Jeonju; Attendance: 300

Game reference

Chen Shifeng
Goalies
Eiki Sato
Referees:
(South Korea) Park Jun-soo
(Kazakhstan) Mihail Stupak
Linesmen:
(South Korea) Lim Jun-seo
(Kazakhstan) Vyacheslav Zbrodko

	0–1	37:26 – Isogai (Hanzawa, Ishida) (PP)
	0–2	44:30 – Nakajima (Hanzawa, Isogai)
	0–3	49:59 – Miura (Okubo)
	0–4	58:26 – Tsutsumi (Suzuki)
Hou (Wang, Yan) – 59:08	1–4

12 min
Penalties
6 min
20
Shots
41

8 November 2026; 17:30	Kazakhstan	1–0 GWS (0–0, 0–0, 0–0) (OT: 0–0) (SO: 1–0)	South Korea	Jeonju Indoor Ice Rink, Jeonju; Attendance: 1,200

Game reference
Choi Su-hoon	Goalies	Vladislav Nurek	Referees: (China) Feng Lei (Japan) Masa Hashimoto; Linesmen: (China) Xu Hehao (Japan) Ryoya Yamada
Gross; Gusseinov (miss); Mukhametov (miss); Rymarev; Iulbarisov (miss); Rymarev; Rymarev (miss); Gross (miss); Gusseinov	Shootout	Lee C. (miss) Kwon M. (miss) Kim Sa. (miss) Kim G. Huh; Lee C. (miss) Lee C. (miss) Kwon M. (miss) Kim Si.	Referees: (China) Feng Lei (Japan) Masa Hashimoto; Linesmen: (China) Xu Hehao (Japan) Ryoya Yamada
8 min	Penalties	9 min	Referees: (China) Feng Lei (Japan) Masa Hashimoto; Linesmen: (China) Xu Hehao (Japan) Ryoya Yamada
29	Shots	23	Referees: (China) Feng Lei (Japan) Masa Hashimoto; Linesmen: (China) Xu Hehao (Japan) Ryoya Yamada
