= Riri Noro =

Japanese ice hockey player (born 2004)

Riri Noro 野呂 莉里
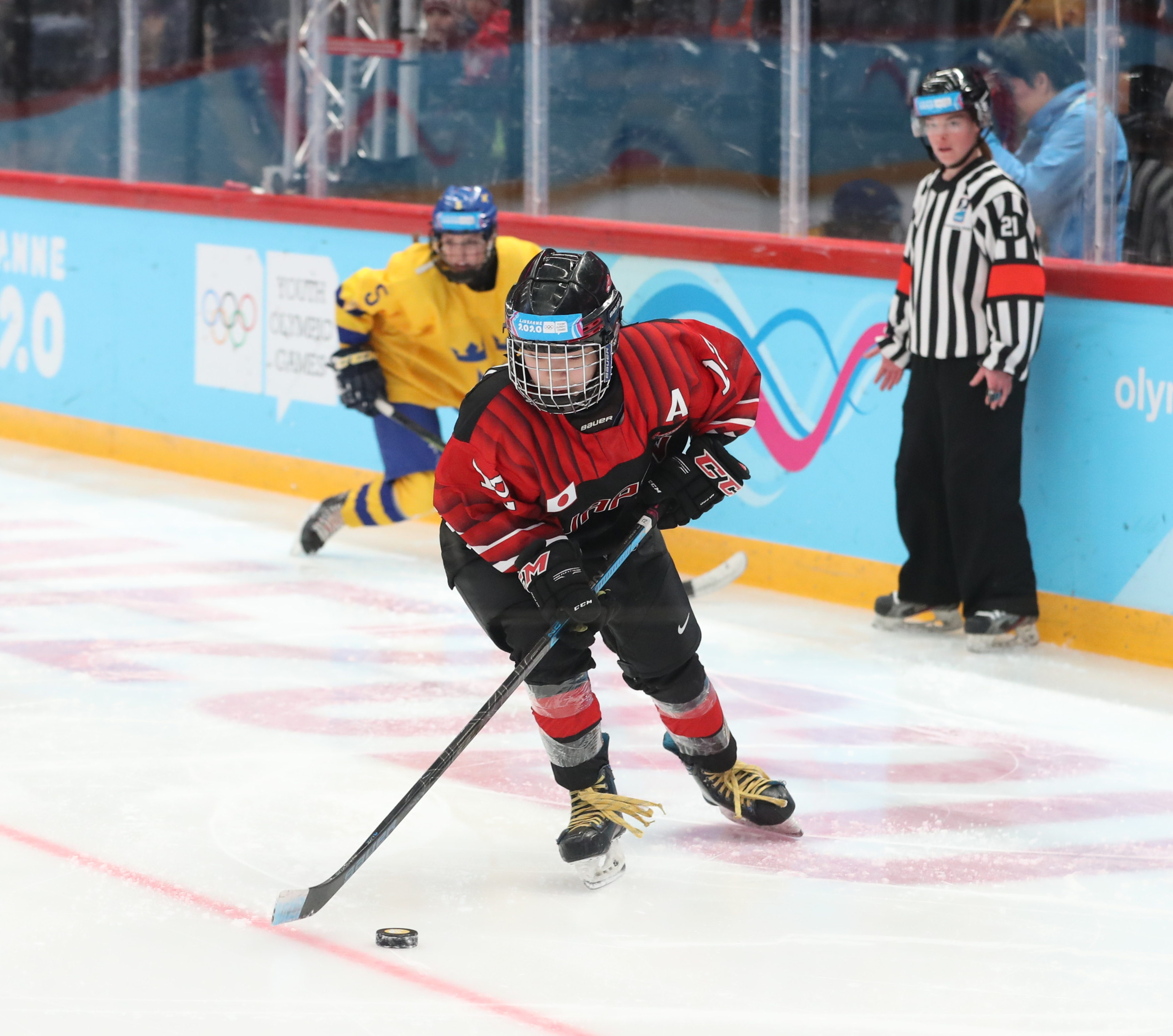
- Noro representing Japan at the 2020 Winter Youth Olympics
- Born: 15 May 2004 (age 22) Kushiro, Hokkaido, Japan
- Height: 161 cm (5 ft 3 in)
- Weight: 56 kg (123 lb; 8 st 11 lb)
- Position: Forward
- Shoots: Left
- WJIHL team: Daishin IHC
- National team: Japan
- Playing career: 2018–present
Medal record
Asian Winter Games
Gold medal – first place	2025 Harbin	Team
World University Games
Bronze medal – third place	2025 Turin	Team

Riri Noro (野呂莉里, Noro Riri; born 15 May 2004) is a Japanese ice hockey player and member of the Japanese national team. She has played with Daishin Ice Hockey Club in the Women's Japan Ice Hockey League (WJIHL) and the All-Japan Women's Ice Hockey Championship since 2018.

== International play ==
Noro represented Japan in the girls' ice hockey tournament at the 2020 Winter Youth Olympics in Lausanne. She scored a goal against Slovakia in the semifinals and assisted on the gold medal winning goal against Sweden.

As a junior player with the Japanese national under-18 team, she participated in the Division 1 Group A tournament of the IIHF U18 Women's World Championship in 2022. Her four goals and three assists ranked third of all tournament players in point scoring and helped Japan achieve promotion to the U18 Top Division.

With the senior national team, Noro participated in the IIHF Women's World Championship in 2023 and 2025. She recorded her first World Championship point on a goal scored against Norway at the 2025 tournament.

She won a bronze medal as part of the Japanese delegation at the 2025 Winter World University Games, scoring one goal across three games of the women's ice hockey tournament. She repeated her World University Games performance – notching one goal over three games – in the women's ice hockey tournament at the 2025 Asian Winter Games, contributing to a gold medal victory for Japan.

Noro represented Japan at the IIHF Asia Championship tournaments in both 2025 and 2026, winning gold medals at both events. After amassing two points (1+1) in 2025, a solid but unremarkable showing, she was the 2026 tournament leader in goals scored, with three, and ranked fourth overall in points, with four.

== Personal life ==
Noro and her twin sister, Rio, were born on 15 May 2004 in the city of Kushiro in Japan's northern most prefecture of Hokkaido. Both Riri and Rio began playing ice hockey at five years of age and have played together on the same teams throughout their careers.

== Career statistics ==
=== International ===
Year	Team	Event	Result	GP	G	A	Pts	PIM
2020	Japan	YOG	1st place, gold medalist(s)	4	1	1	2	4
2022	Japan	WC18 D1A	1st	4	4	3	7	0
2023	Japan	WC	7th	4	0	0	0	0
2025	Japan	AC	1st place, gold medalist(s)	3	1	1	2	0
2025	Japan	WUG	3rd place, bronze medalist(s)	3	1	0	1	0
2025	Japan	AWG	1st place, gold medalist(s)	3	1	0	1	4
2025	Japan	OGQ	Q	3	1	0	1	0
2025	Japan	WC	7th	5	1	0	1	2
2026	Japan	AC	1st place, gold medalist(s)	3	3	1	4	2
2026	Japan	OG	9th	4	0	1	1	0
