= Boris Alexandrov Sports Palace =

Hockey arena in Kazakhstan

Coordinates: 49°57′24″N 82°36′57″E

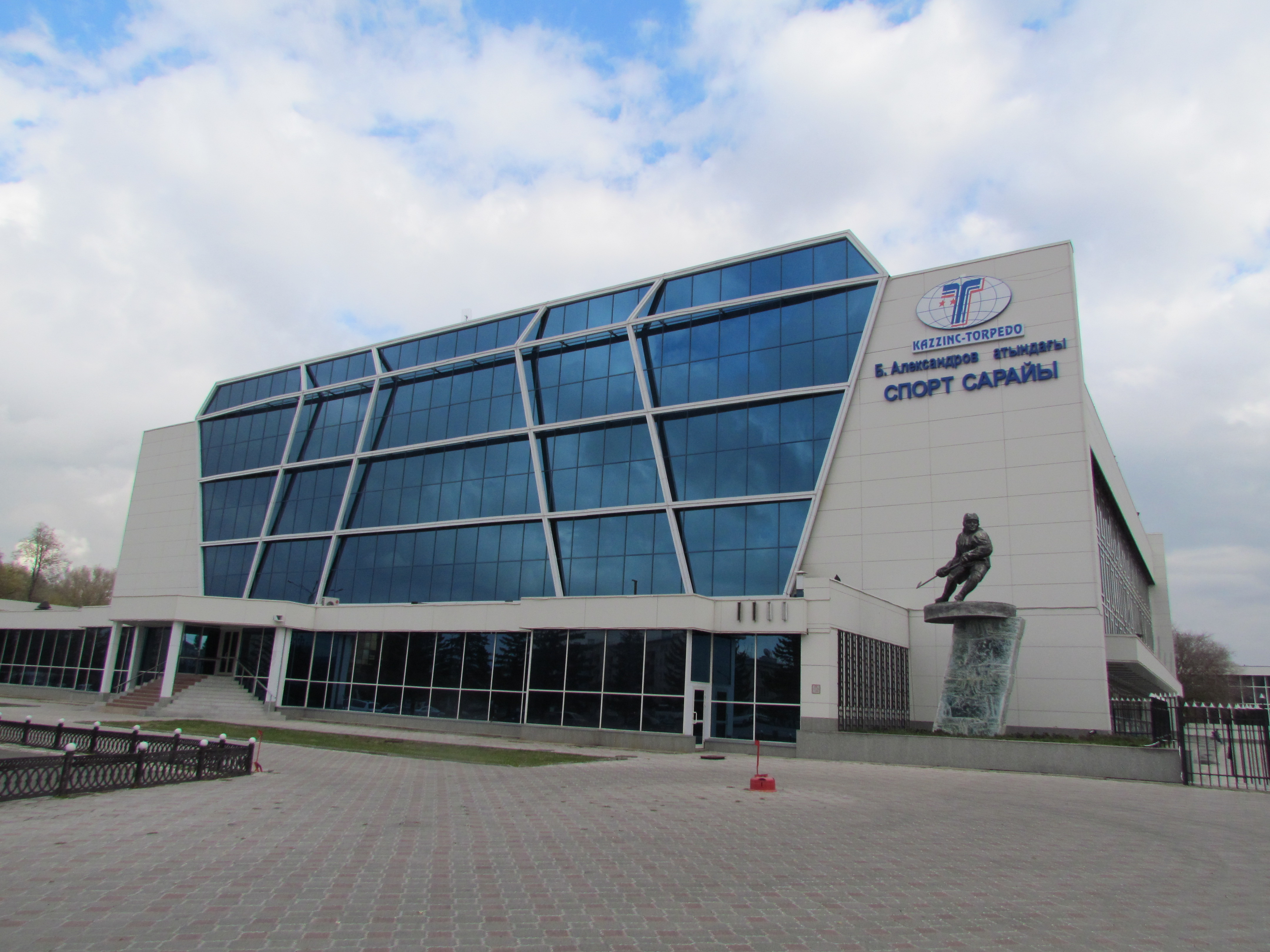
- Interactive map of Boris Alexandrov Sports Palace
- Former names: Ust-Kamenogorsk Sports Palace (1968–1999); Commercial center of sports and leisure (1999–2010)
- Location: Oskemen, Kazakhstan
- Owner: Kazzinc
- Capacity: 4,400

Construction
- Built: 1964-1968
- Opened: December 31, 1968 (57 years ago)
- Renovated: 2001

Tenant
- Torpedo Ust-Kamenogorsk (VHL)

Boris Alexandrov Sports Palace (Kazakh: Борис Александров атындағы спорт сарайы, Borıs Aleksandrov atyndaǵy sport saraıy; Russian: Дворец спорта имени Бориса Александрова) is an ice hockey indoor arena in Oskemen, Kazakhstan. The sports palace was renamed after Soviet and Kazakhstani ice hockey player Boris Alexandrov in 2010. It is the home arena of the Torpedo Ust-Kamenogorsk hockey club.

== History ==
The sports palace was constructed from 1964 to 1968. It was the first stadium in Kazakhstan to utilize a truss in construction. It was also the first ice hockey indoor arena in the Soviet Union to be built with a training ground. Initially, the main arena accommodated 5200 spectators. In 2001, Kazzinc company rebuilt the arena at a cost of three million dollars. After reconstruction, capacity was reduced to 4,400.

== See also ==
- List of indoor arenas in Kazakhstan
