= Alexander Akmaldinov =

Kazakhstani-born Russian ice hockey player

- Born: 23 June 1994 (age 32) Ust-Kamenogorsk, Kazakhstan
- Height: 6 ft 2 in (188 cm)
- Weight: 194 lb (88 kg; 13 st 12 lb)
- Position: Centre
- Shoots: Left
- VHL team Former teams: Yugra Khanty-Mansiysk; HC Sochi
- Playing career: 2015–present

Alexander Ravilevich Akmaldinov (Russian: Александр Равильевич Акмальдинов; born 23 June 1994) is a Kazakhstani-born Russian professional ice hockey centre who is currently playing for Yugra Khanty-Mansiysk of the Supreme Hockey League. He previously played in the Kontinental Hockey League for Yugra and HC Sochi.

Akmaldinov made his KHL debut with Yugra Khanty-Mansiysk during the 2015–16 KHL season. He signed with HC Spartak Moscow on September 8, 2015, but was released just three months later without ever playing a game for Spartak and he returned to Yugra. On October 20, 2017, Akmaldinov moved to HC Sochi. He was released from his contract by mutual consent on August 25, 2019.
