= Rio Noro =

Japanese ice hockey player (born 2004)

Rio Noro 野呂 里桜
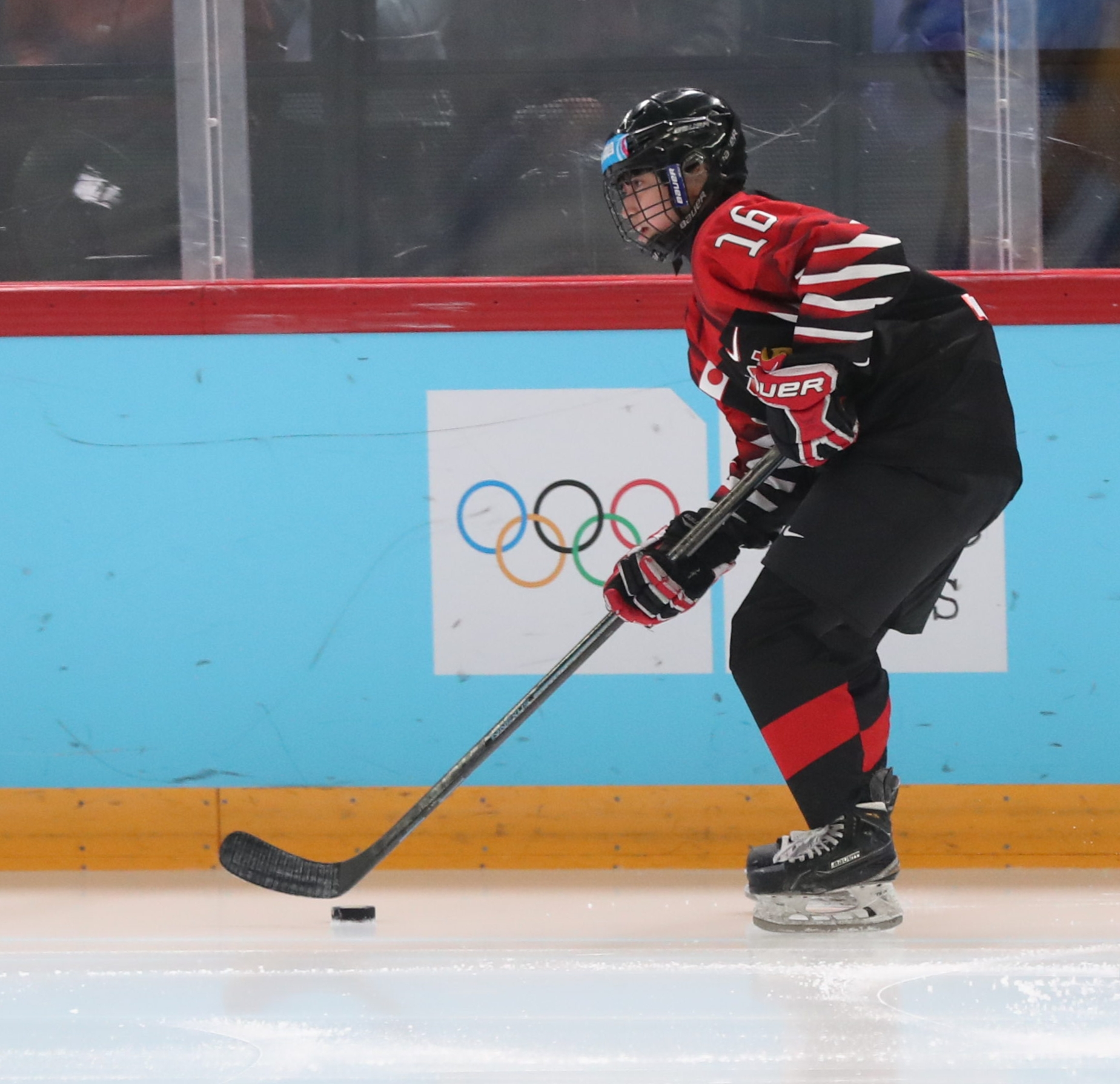
- Noro representing Japan at the 2020 Winter Youth Olympics
- Born: 15 May 2004 (age 22) Kushiro, Hokkaido, Japan
- Height: 164 cm (5 ft 5 in)
- Weight: 58 kg (128 lb; 9 st 2 lb)
- Position: Forward
- Shoots: Right
- WJIHL team: Daishin IHC
- National team: Japan
- Playing career: 2018–present
Medal record
Asian Winter Games
| Gold medal – first place | 2025 Harbin | Team |

Rio Noro (野呂里桜, Noro Rio; born 15 May 2004) is a Japanese ice hockey player and member of the Japanese national team. She has played with Daishin Ice Hockey Club in the Women's Japan Ice Hockey League (WJIHL) and the All-Japan Women's Ice Hockey Championship since 2018.

== International play ==
Noro represented Japan in the girls' ice hockey tournament at the 2020 Winter Youth Olympics in Lausanne, where she scored the gold medal winning goal against Sweden.

As a junior player with the Japanese national under-18 team, she participated in the Division 1 Group A tournament of the IIHF U18 Women's World Championship in 2022. Her one goal and four assists ranked seventh of all tournament players in point scoring and helped Japan achieve promotion to the U18 Top Division.

Noro made her debut with the senior national team at the IIHF Women's World Championship in 2023 and she has gone on to represent Japan at the World Championship tournaments in 2024 and 2025.

The IIHF Asia Championship tournaments have served to showcase Noro's offensive skill. She ranked second of all tournament players for scoring in both 2025 and 2026, contributing to Japan's gold medal victories at both events.

== Personal life ==
Noro and her twin sister, Riri, were born on 15 May 2004 in the city of Kushiro in Japan's northern most prefecture of Hokkaido. Both Rio and Riri began playing ice hockey at five years of age and have played together on the same teams throughout their careers.

== Career statistics ==
=== International ===
| Year | Team | Event | Result | GP | G | A | Pts | PIM |
|---|---|---|---|---|---|---|---|---|
| 2020 | Japan | YOG | 1st place, gold medalist(s) | 4 | 1 | 0 | 1 | 0 |
| 2022 | Japan | WC18 D1A | 1st | 4 | 1 | 4 | 5 | 2 |
| 2023 | Japan | WC | 7th | 6 | 0 | 1 | 1 | 0 |
| 2024 | Japan | WC | 8th | 5 | 0 | 0 | 0 | 0 |
| 2025 | Japan | AC | 1st place, gold medalist(s) | 3 | 3 | 4 | 7 | 0 |
| 2025 | Japan | AWG | 1st place, gold medalist(s) | 3 | 0 | 0 | 0 | 0 |
| 2025 | Japan | OGQ | Q | 3 | 0 | 0 | 0 | 0 |
| 2025 | Japan | WC | 7th | 5 | 0 | 0 | 0 | 0 |
| 2026 | Japan | AC | 1st place, gold medalist(s) | 3 | 2 | 3 | 5 | 0 |
| 2026 | Japan | OG | 9th | 4 | 0 | 1 | 1 | 0 |
