= Kazzinc =

Kazakhstan mining company

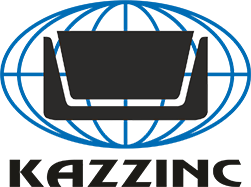
- Industry: mining
- Founded: 1997
- Headquarters: Kazakhstan
- Key people: Zhanat Zhanbotin, Chief Executive Officer
- Number of employees: 20,000
- Parent: Glencore (69.61%)
- Website: www.kazzinc.com

Kazzinc (Kazakh: Қазмырыш, romanized: Qazmyrysh, قازمىرىش, pronounced [qɑzməˈɾəɕ]) with its headquarters in Oskemen is Kazakhstan's largest producer of zinc, lead and precious metals. The general investor is Glencore International AG. Kazzinc’s core operations are in East-Kazakhstan, Karagandy and Akmola regions of Kazakhstan. According to the data for 2020, Kazzinc employs over 20,000 people.

== Background ==
Kazzinc as a company was established is 1997 through the merger of East Kazakhstan’s main ore and non-ferrous metal producers: Zyryanovsk Lead Complex in Zyryanovsk (now Altay), Leninogorsk Polymetallic Complex in the Leninogorsk (now Ridder) and Ust-Kamenogorsk Lead and Zinc Complex in Ust-Kamenogorsk (now Oskemen). All three producers were majority-owned by the Government of Kazakhstan. After the merger, they were sold to the private sector, and the Swiss group Glencore International became the company’s main investor.

Bukhtarma Hydro Power Plant is operated by Kazzinc under a long-term concession agreement.

Kazzinc is a general sponsor of Torpedo Ice Hockey Club, based in Oskemen.

== Organizational structure ==
Oskemen

- Oskemen Metallurgical Complex
  - Zinc Plant
  - Lead Plant
  - Copper Plant
  - Precious Metals Refinery

Ridder

- Ridder Mining and Concentrating Complex
- Ridder Metallurgical Complex
- KazzincMash Industrial Complex
- Kazzinc-Shakhtostroy Industrial Complex

Altay

- Altay Mining and Concentrating Complex

Serebryansk

- Bukhtarma Hydro Power Plant

Zhairem

- Zhairem Mining and Concentrating Complex

Kokshetau

- Altyntau Kokshetau Ltd

== Company Management ==
Zhanat Zhanbotin, Chief Executive Officer, Kazzinc Ltd

Daniyar Tursunkulov, Executive Director, Transformation (formerly CFO)

Turarbek Azekenov, Executive Director, Metallurgy

Nariman Kuanyshev, Executive Director, Government Relations

Igor Radovic, Executive Director, Commerce

Andrey Lazarev, Executive Director, Administration

Andrey Dobroumov, Executive Technical Director

Margarita Plakhotnikova, Executive Director, Corporate Development

== Honors and awards ==
Kazzinc is a five-time winner of the Paryz National Prize established by the President of Kazakhstan and an eight-time winner of the Golden Hephaestus National Award for ore and metal producers.

== Social Contribution ==
Kazzinc is an active contributor to the social and economic development of the regions where its operations are located. Kazzinc sponsors healthcare, public education, sports and cultural institutions, invests in social infrastructure and supports socially vulnerable groups in Oskemen, Altay, Ridder, Kokshetau and Zhairem.

Construction of the following social facilities was sponsored by Kazzinc:

Oskemen

- The Palace of Combat Sports;
- Olga Rypakova Field-and-Track Training Center;
- The Central Swimming Pool;
- The Tennis Center;
- The Asyl Miras Children's Autism Center;
- Repairs of Boris Alexandrov Palace of Sports.

Zhairem

- The Central Mosque
- The Community Center

Ridder

- The Central Mosque

Kazzinc patronizes several children’s homes in East Kazakhstan Region. In July 2019 Kazzinc launched the Larger Family Support Program. Kazzinc donates approximately KZT 11.0 billion (about $28.5M) annually to the local communities where its operations are located.

The company established a regional Heroism Award for the acts of heroism by the local people. The winners are selected through public opinion polls.
