= Jeonju Indoor Ice Rink =

Ice rink in South Korea

Coordinates: 35°49′19″N 127°07′26″E

Jeonju Indoor Ice Rink (전주실내빙상경기장), sometimes called Hwasan Indoor Ice Rink, is an indoor ice rink in Wansan-gu, Jeonju-si, Jeollabuk-do, South Korea. It was completed in 1996, originally for the 1997 Winter Universiade. At the Winter Universiade, it was the venue for the figure skating and short track speed skating events. It also hosted the Four Continents Figure Skating Championships in 2002 and 2010. It is the largest ice rink in Jeollabuk-do.

Next to the ice rink, Hwasan Gymnasium (initially called Indoor Ice Rink #2) is located which was also built for the Winter Universiade together with the ice rink.
