= IIHF Asia Championship Series =

International ice hockey competitions for national teams

- Current season, competition or edition: 2027 IIHF Asia Championship; 2027 IIHF Women's Asia Championship
- Sport: Ice hockey
- Founded: May 2023
- Founder: International Ice Hockey Federation
- First season: 2025
- No. of teams: 4 (men); 4 (women)
- Continent: Asia
- Most recent champions: Kazakhstan (men); Japan (women) (2025)
- Most titles: Kazakhstan (men, 3 titles); Japan (women, 3 titles)

The IIHF Asia Championship Series comprises the IIHF Asia Championship and the IIHF Women's Asia Championship, two annual ice hockey tournaments sanctioned by the International Ice Hockey Federation (IIHF) for Asian national teams. The national teams of China, Japan, Kazakhstan, and South Korea are represented in both the men's and women's tournaments.

== History ==
The Asia Championship Series was created in May 2023 through collaboration between the IIHF and the national federations of China, Japan, Kazakhstan, and South Korea. The series is meant to serve as a pilot project for hockey development in the participating nations. The four national federations have agreed to participate in the series at both the men's and women's senior levels for four consecutive years, i.e. through 2028.

Regarding the series' purpose and potential influence, IIHF President Luc Tardiff explained that the IIHF intended to "[use] this platform to evaluate the impact in multiple areas... [and] may potentially organize more regional competitions and championships in the future".

== Results ==
=== Men ===
The men's tournament is officially called the IIHF Ice Hockey Asia Championship. The inaugural tournament was held during 6 to 9 November 2024 at Halyk Arena. The second edition was held in Beijing, China, from 20 to 23 November 2025.

#	Year	Champion	Second place	Third place	Fourth place	Host city	Host country
1	2025	Kazakhstan (1)	Japan	South Korea	China	Almaty	Kazakhstan
2	2026	Kazakhstan (2)	South Korea	Japan	China	Beijing	China
3	2027	Kazakhstan (3)	Japan	South Korea	China	Jeonju	South Korea

=== Women ===
The women's tournament is officially called the IIHF Ice Hockey Women's Asia Championship. The inaugural tournament was held during 31 October to 3 November 2024 at Shougang Ice Hockey Arena (Shougang Ice Rink).

#	Year	Champion	Second place	Third place	Fourth place	Host city	Host country
1	2025	Japan (1)	China	Kazakhstan	South Korea	Beijing	China
2	2026	Japan (2)	China	Kazakhstan	South Korea	Oskemen	Kazakhstan
3	2027	Japan (3)	China	Kazakhstan	South Korea	Sapporo	Japan

== See also ==
- IIHF European Cup of Nations
- Euro Hockey Tour
