= Oskemen =

Capital of East Kazakhstan Region, Kazakhstan

Öskemen Өскемен (Kazakh) Усть-Каменогорск (Russian)
- City
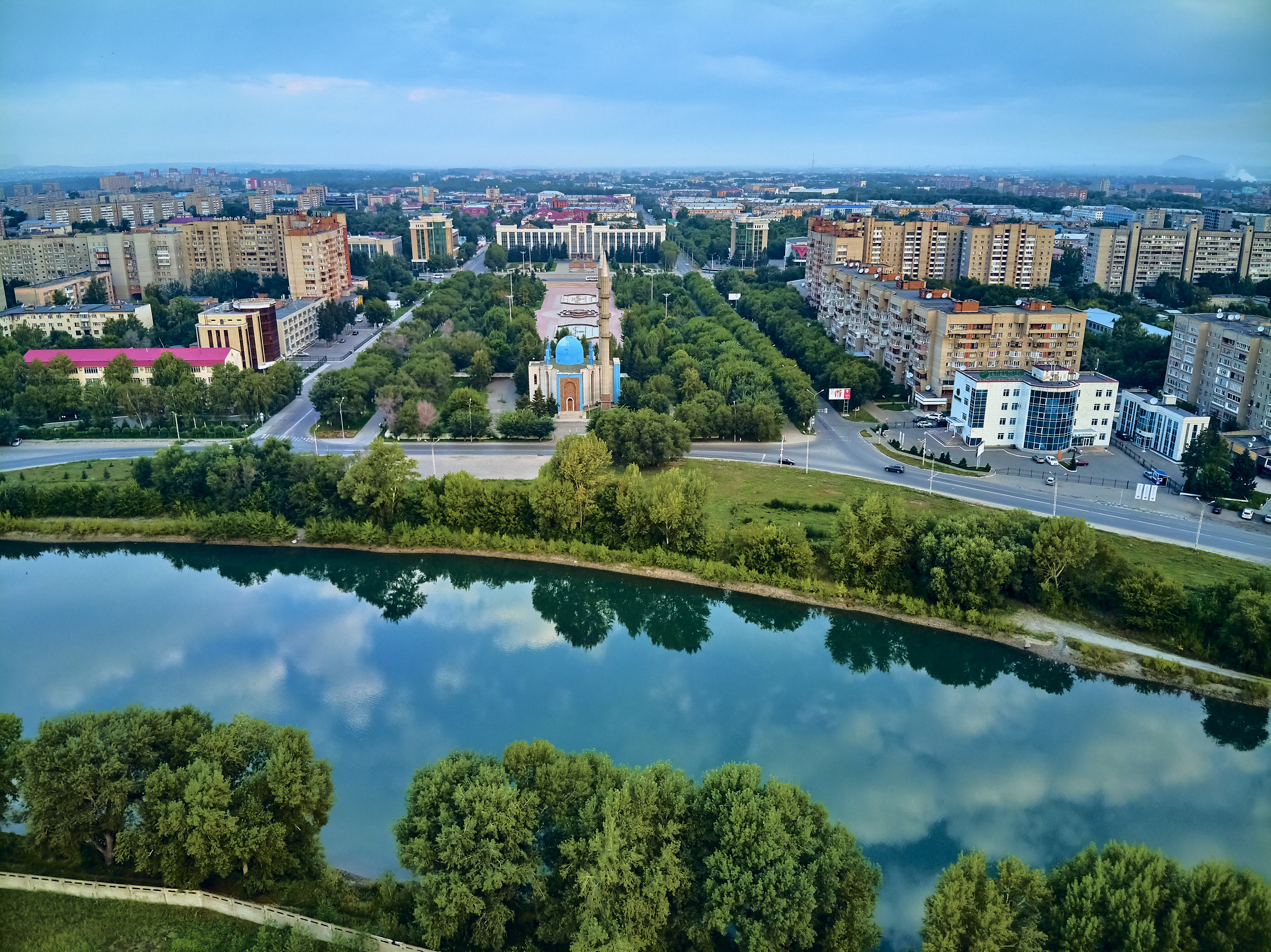
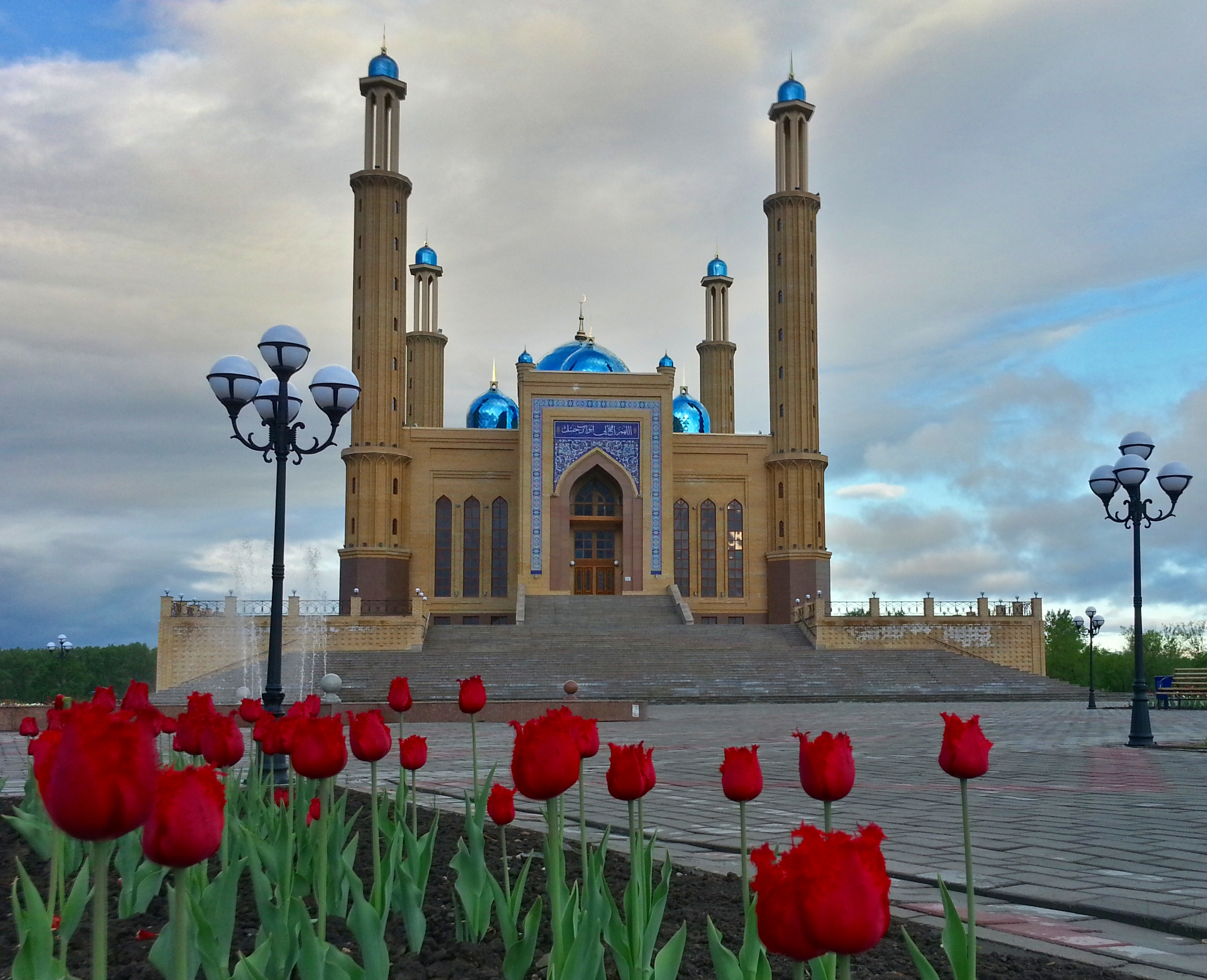
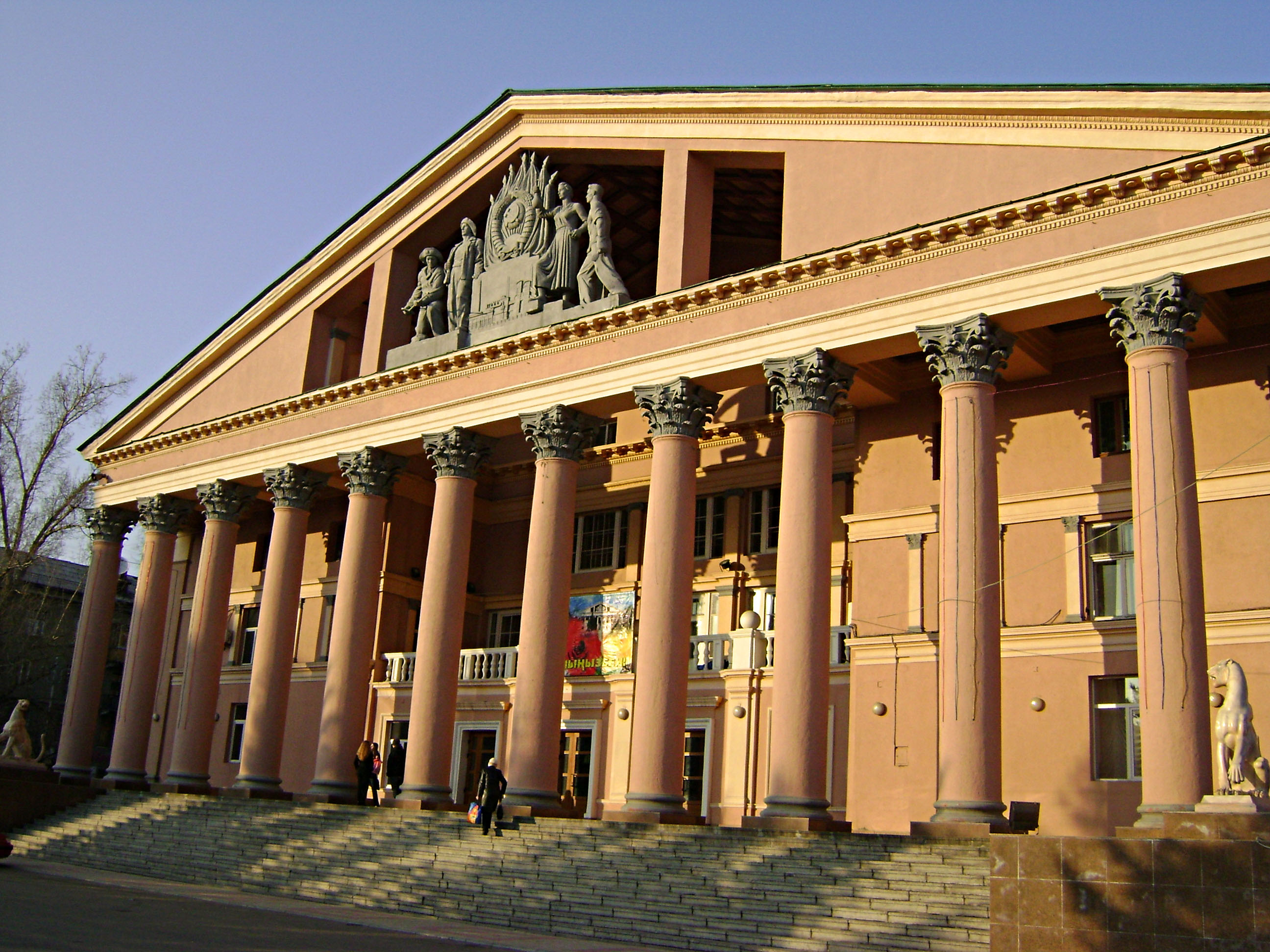
- From the top, View over Oskemen, New Mosque of Oskemen, Palace of Culture

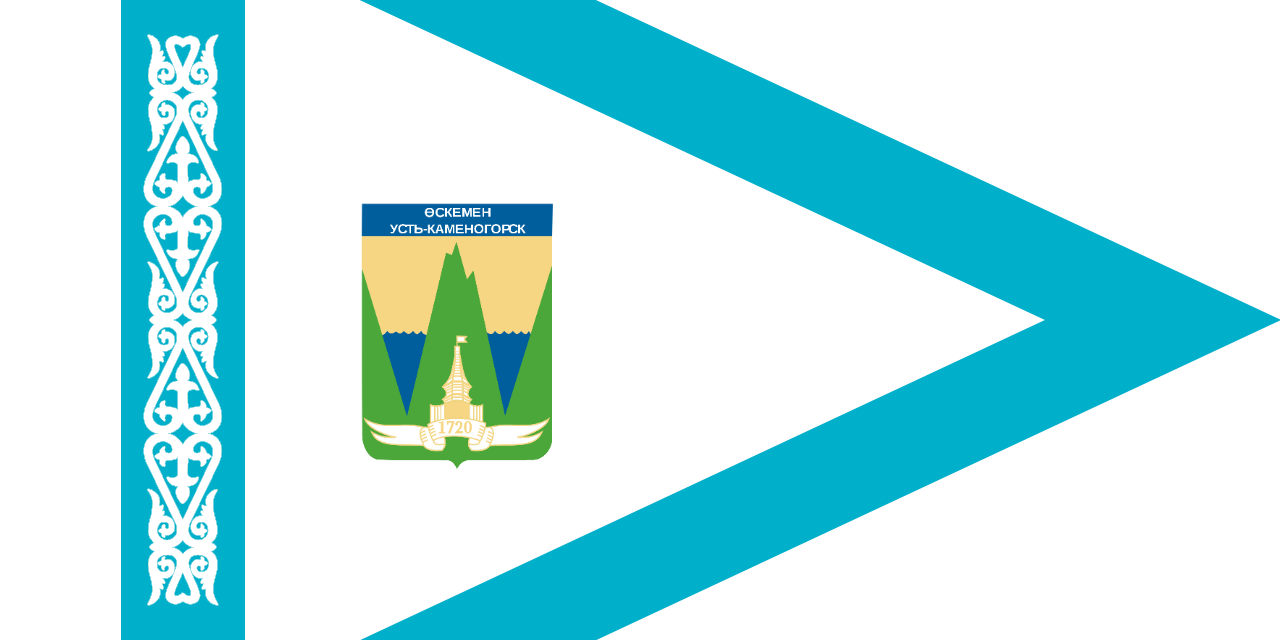
- Flag Seal

- Location in Kazakhstan
- Coordinates: 49°59′N 82°37′E
- Country: Kazakhstan
- Region: East Kazakhstan Region
- Founded: 1720
- Incorporated (city): 1868

Government
  - Akim: Almat Akyshov

Area
  - Total: 540 km^{2} (210 sq mi)
- Elevation: 283 m (928 ft)

Population (2023)
  - Total: 400,142 ▲
- Time zone: UTC+5
- Postal code: F0*****
- Area code: +7 7232
- Vehicle registration: F, 16
- Website: www.oskemen.kz

Öskemen (Kazakh: Өскемен [ʉ̯ɵskʲeˈmʲen]) or Ust-Kamenogorsk (Russian: Усть-Каменогорск, IPA: [ˌʊsʲtʲ kəmʲɪnɐˈgorsk]) is the largest city in eastern Kazakhstan and the administrative center of the East Kazakhstan Region.

== Name ==
The city has two official names. In the Kazakh language, its name is Oskemen (Өскемен). In Russian, it is known as Ust-Kamenogorsk (Усть-Каменогорск), derived from the words "mouth" (usta), "stone" (kamen), and "mountain" (gorsk). The word Oskemen is the Kazakh-language version of the Russian name. Both names appear on the seal of the city.

== History ==
The city was founded in 1720 at the confluence of the Irtysh and Ulba rivers as a fort and trading post named Ust-Kamennaya. It was established according to the order of the Russian Emperor Peter the Great, who sent a military expedition headed by major Ivan Mihailovich Likharev in search of Yarkenda gold. Likharev's expedition traveled up the Irtysh River toward Zaysan Lake.

The Ust-Kamennaya Fortress was laid at the junction of the Ulba and the Irtysh rivers. The fortress appeared on the map of the Russian Empire on the very southern end of the Irtysh line. In 1868, the city became the capital of the Semipalatinsk Oblast. It was the site of former Soviet premier Georgy Malenkov's 30-year exile, during which he managed a local hydroelectric plant.

The Ulba Metal Works (UMW), a major industrial enterprise which produces uranium products, was kept secret despite its employment of thousands of workers. An explosion at the UMW's beryllium production line in 1990 led to the spread of a highly toxic beryllium-containing "cloud" over the city. The health effects of this incident are not fully known, partly because the incident was kept hidden by the Soviet authorities.

In 1994, the US government conducted Project Sapphire in collaboration with the Kazakh government to remove weapons-grade enriched uranium left at the Ulba Metallurgical Plant after the dissolution of the Soviet Union.

In 2017, the Ulba Metallurgical Plant was inaugurated by the International Atomic Energy Agency (IAEA) as the home of the Low Enriched Uranium (LEU) bank, serving as a last-resort supply mechanism for IAEA member states. The LEU bank is a physical stock of 90 metric tons of LEU hexafluoride, containing enough uranium to power a large city for three years. The facility was fully funded by IAEA member states and other contributors for a total of $150 million. These funds are expected to cover costs for 20 years. Safety, security, and safeguarding operations of the LEU bank fall under the responsibilities of Oskemen local authorities.

== Economy ==
The post-war industrial history of the city is closely intertwined with the Soviet nuclear bomb project; as such, the city was kept closed to outsiders. During the Soviet era, the city developed into a major mining, metallurgical, and construction center. The processing of non-ferrous metals, such as uranium, beryllium, tantalum, copper, lead, silver and zinc, as well as the production of manufactured housing and ferroconcrete articles, continue to remain central to the city's economy.

The number of enterprises in Oskemen is relatively high compared to the number of inhabitants. According to data from 2002, there are about 169 firms. Most of them are industrial firms, specializing in the mining and processing of raw materials, mostly heavy metals.

Kazzinc is a major fully integrated zinc producer with considerable copper, precious metals and lead credits. The company was established in 1997 through the merger of Eastern Kazakhstan's three main non-ferrous metal companies: Ust-Kamenogorsk Lead and Zinc Combinate, Leninogorsk Polymetallic Combinate and Zyryanovsk Lead Combinate. The company has a stable position as one of the world's five lowest cost zinc producers. Apart from zinc, it produces lead, silver, copper, and other precious metals.

The Titanium-Magnesium plant specializes in producing and selling nonferrous metals. The Ulba Metallurgical Plant produces uranium, beryllium and tantalum products, which are used in atomic engineering, electronics, and metallurgy.

Apart from the mining and processing companies, there are numerous thermoelectric power stations and about five hydropower plants concentrated around the Ust-Kamenogorsk region of Eastern Kazakhstan. The highest lock in the world is the Oskemen Lock and lies at Ablaketka, where it allows river traffic to pass around a hydroelectric dam on the Irtysh river. It has a drop of more than 40m.

== Demographics ==
=== Ethnic groups ===
Ethnic composition of the city at the beginning of 2025:

	Population	%
Kazakhs	194,793	51.51
Russians	164,537	43.51
Germans	4,452	1.18
Tatars	3,357	0.89
Ukrainians	3,251	0.86
Azerbaijanis	950	0.25
Belarusians	931	0.25
Uzbeks	730	0.19
Chechens	590	0.16
Koreans	498	0.13
Others	4,072	1.08
Total	378,161	100

=== Religion ===
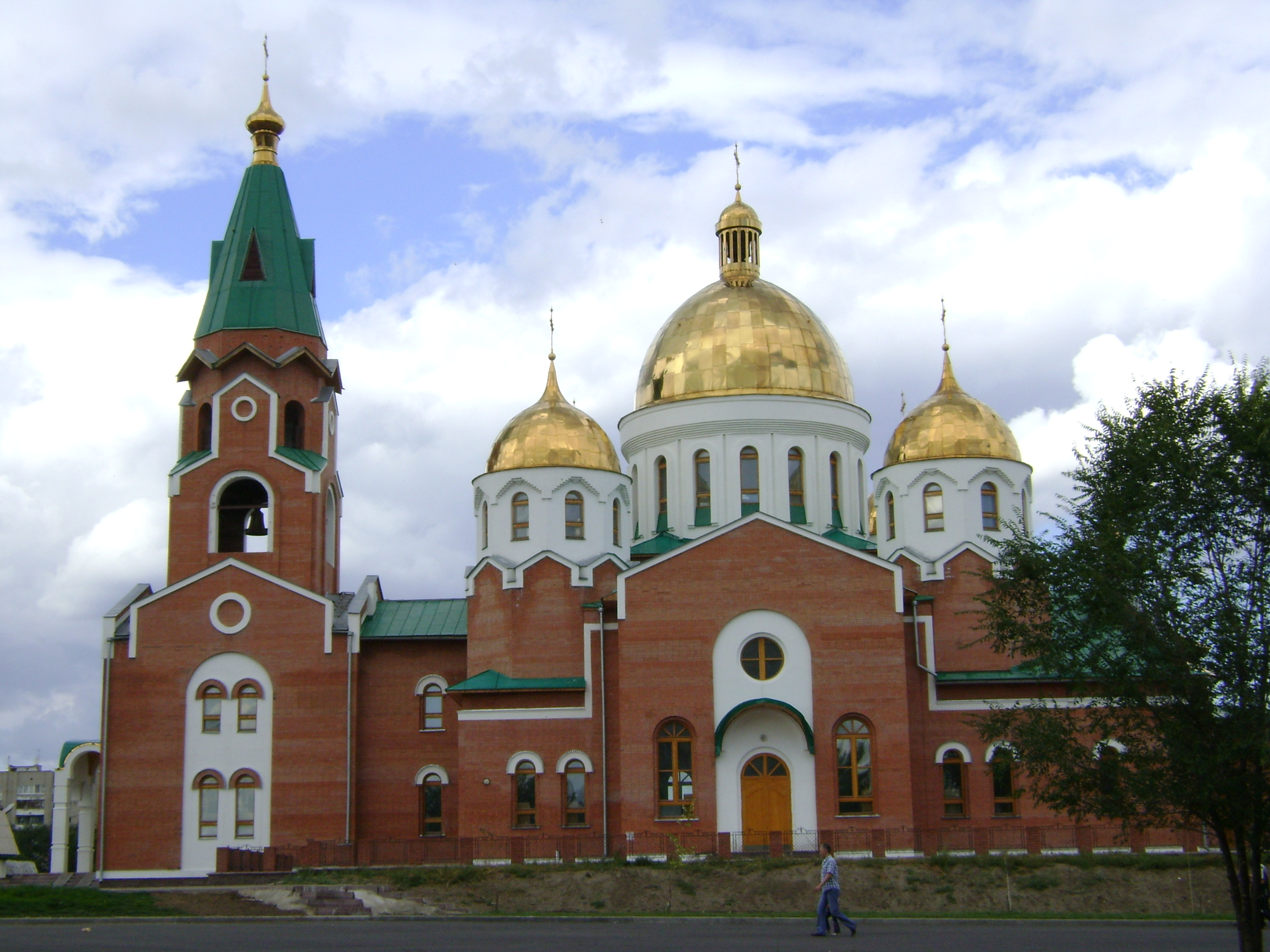
Russian Orthodox Church

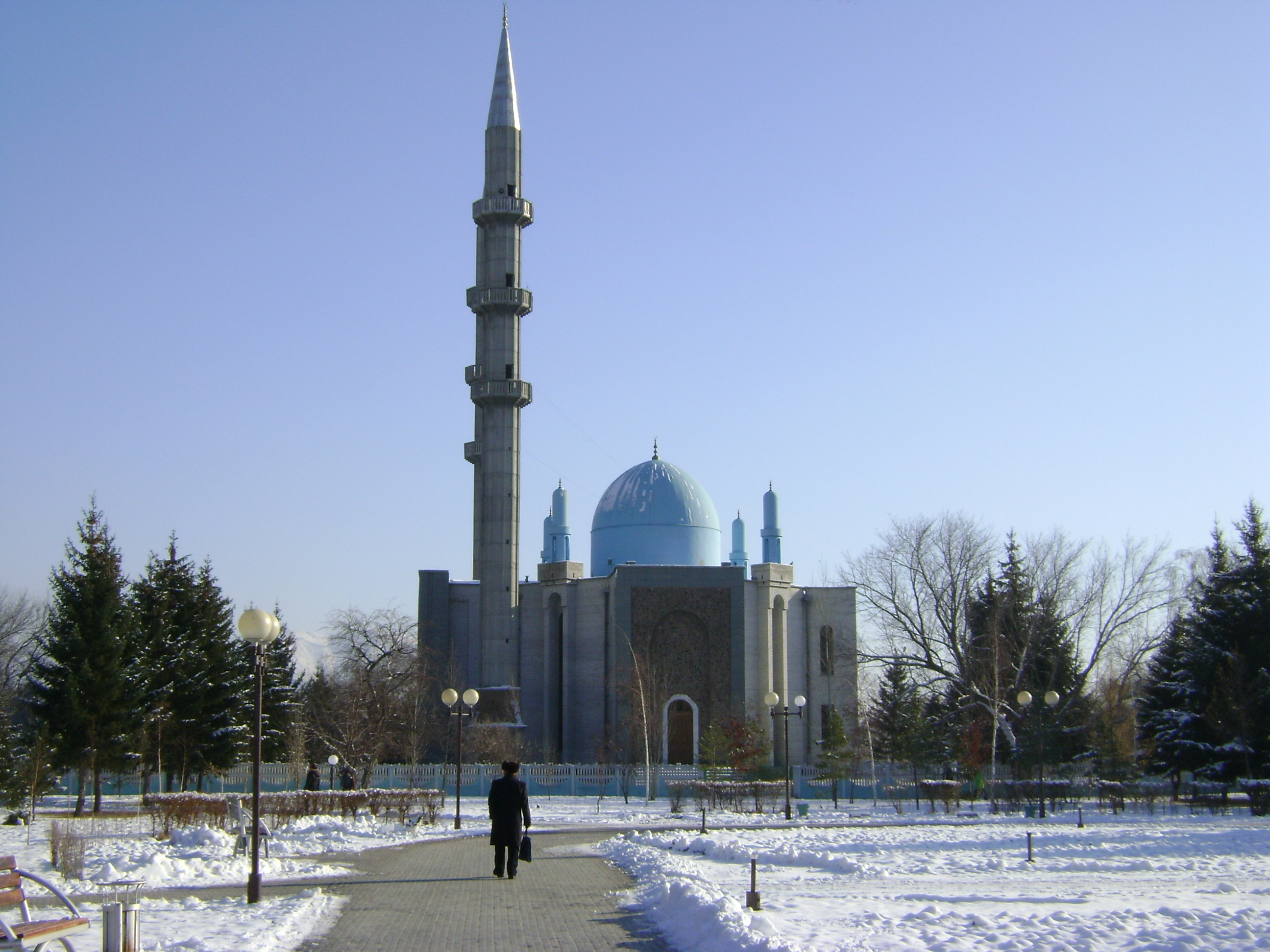
Mosque in Oskemen

Orthodox Christianity and Sunni Islam are the city's primary religions. There are 32 religious unions, representing 15 religious confessions. Among the 21 cultural buildings in the city, 6 are Orthodox Christian churches and 4 are mosques.

== Climate ==
Oskemen has a humid continental climate (Köppen climate classification Dfb). The coldest months are November through March. Record low temperatures range from −49 °C in January to 4 °C in July, and record highs range from 8 °C in January to 43 °C in July.

Climate data for Oskemen (1991-2020, extremes 1895-present)
Month	Jan	Feb	Mar	Apr	May	Jun	Jul	Aug	Sep	Oct	Nov	Dec	Year
Record high °C (°F)	9.0 (48.2)	10.5 (50.9)	22.0 (71.6)	31.9 (89.4)	38.0 (100.4)	37.5 (99.5)	41.0 (105.8)	42.8 (109.0)	38.6 (101.5)	29.3 (84.7)	22.7 (72.9)	11.9 (53.4)	42.8 (109.0)
Mean daily maximum °C (°F)	−9.8 (14.4)	−7.0 (19.4)	0.4 (32.7)	13.9 (57.0)	21.6 (70.9)	26.2 (79.2)	27.8 (82.0)	26.7 (80.1)	20.6 (69.1)	12.3 (54.1)	0.6 (33.1)	−6.8 (19.8)	10.5 (51.0)
Daily mean °C (°F)	−15.3 (4.5)	−13.3 (8.1)	−5.5 (22.1)	7.0 (44.6)	14.1 (57.4)	19.2 (66.6)	20.5 (68.9)	18.2 (64.8)	12.3 (54.1)	5.4 (41.7)	−4.7 (23.5)	−11.6 (11.1)	3.9 (39.0)
Mean daily minimum °C (°F)	−20.4 (−4.7)	−19.2 (−2.6)	−11.0 (12.2)	0.5 (32.9)	6.9 (44.4)	12.5 (54.5)	14.2 (57.6)	11.4 (52.5)	4.6 (40.3)	−0.2 (31.6)	−9.1 (15.6)	−16.3 (2.7)	−2.2 (28.1)
Record low °C (°F)	−47.2 (−53.0)	−44.6 (−48.3)	−40 (−40)	−26.1 (−15.0)	−7.3 (18.9)	−1.3 (29.7)	1.3 (34.3)	−0.7 (30.7)	−8.9 (16.0)	−21.5 (−6.7)	−42.8 (−45.0)	−42.2 (−44.0)	−47.2 (−53.0)
Average precipitation mm (inches)	27.7 (1.09)	26.1 (1.03)	30.3 (1.19)	38.4 (1.51)	41.9 (1.65)	48.2 (1.90)	63.5 (2.50)	38.9 (1.53)	30.3 (1.19)	44.4 (1.75)	50.3 (1.98)	38.3 (1.51)	478.3 (18.83)
Average precipitation days (≥ 1.0 mm)	6.5	6.1	6.8	7.1	6.7	7.7	8.9	6.3	5.6	8.4	9.2	8.4	87.7
Source 1: Pogoda.ru.net
Source 2: NOAA

== Ecology ==
Oskemen is often recognized as one of the most polluted cities in Kazakhstan. The atmosphere holds the byproducts of the city's heavy metals production: nitrogen dioxide, sulfur dioxide, zinc, cadmium, chlorine, arsenic, carbon, beryllium, phenol, benzol, sodium hydroxide, ammonia, and many more. In total, there are approximately 170 polluting components found in the city. With poor urban ventilation at the average percentage of 48%, alongside a large number of vehicles and stationary sources, air pollution in Oskemen is prevalent.

As a result of large production of uranium and the presence of other radioactive elements, such as thorium and radon, the city has several sites with detected radioactive anomalies. Many of these anomalies are found in the city's soil, which also holds unsafe levels of highly toxic metals.

The most polluted rivers of the Republic are those flowing through the territory of the East Kazakhstan region. The highest index of surface water pollution is observed in mining areas where the enrichment of polymetallic ores takes place. Water quality is affected by industrial waste and the storage of waste, with water contaminated with lead, selenium, cadmium, and nitrates which spread for many kilometers. As a consequence, drinking water intakes in the Western part of the city are closed or planned to be closed.

Oskemen's population experiences high rates of respiratory problems and immune system diseases, much of which can be attributed to the city's environmental conditions. In recent years, the city's cancer incidence rate has increased sharply, driven by increased rates of lung cancer, breast cancer, and skin cancer.

== Transport ==
The city has an international airport, Oskemen Airport, as well as a tram system with 4 lines and an intercity bus service.

The intercity bus service is available at two bus stations. The most extensive network, with more than 35 lines, is at the railway station, which is located by the Sports Palace on Novoshkolnaya Street. From this station, buses not only serve cities within Kazakhstan, but also Russian cities such as Krasnoyarsk. The route network at the second station covers a smaller area with 17 lines.

== Culture ==
The city has several movie theaters and museums. It also houses the Zhambyl regional drama theater, which features Russian and Kazakh troupes.

=== Sport ===
Boris Alexandrov Sports Palace serves as home arena to the ice hockey club HC Torpedo (officially Kazzinc-Torpedo, commonly referred to as Torpedo Ust-Kamenogorsk). Torpedo's men's representative team plays in the Supreme Hockey League (VHL), of which it was a founding member, and the women's representative team plays in the Kazakh Women's Ice Hockey League. The men's farm team, Altay-Torpedo, competes in the Kazakhstan Hockey Championship and the men's under-20 team, Altay, plays in the Eastern Conference of the Junior Hockey League (MHL). Torpedo is the alma mater of NHL players Nik Antropov, Vitali Kolesnik, Evgeni Nabokov, Alexander Perezhogin, and Konstantin Pushkaryov.

The football club FC Vostok Oskemen was a founding member of the Kazakhstan Premier League and currently plays in the Kazakhstan First Division. The team's home ground is Vostok Stadium.

Oskemen hosted the national rink bandy championship in 2014 and the national amateur bandy championship in 2018.

== Twin towns – sister cities ==
Oskemen is twinned with:

- Babruysk, Belarus
- Yokneam Illit, Israel
- Barnaul, Russia
- Tacheng, China

== People ==
- Max Birbraer (born 1980), Kazakhstan-born Israeli ice hockey right wing currently playing for the Cardiff Devils of the Elite Ice Hockey League.
- Anton Khudobin, ice hockey goalie currently playing for the Texas Stars of the AHL.
- Nik Antropov, ice hockey centre who played in the NHL and the KHL.
- Georgy Malenkov, former Premier of the Soviet Union; exiled by Nikita Khrushchev to Oskemen to manage the hydroelectric plant after an abortive coup plot.
- Evgeni Nabokov, former ice hockey goalie. Played for the San Jose Sharks, New York Islanders and Tampa Bay Lightning of the NHL. Ranks 18th all time in the NHL for regular season wins and holds every major goaltending record for San Jose.
- Alexander Perezhogin, former ice hockey player for the Montreal Canadiens.
- Olga Rypakova, Olympic long jumper. Won a gold medal for Kazakhstan in the triple jump at the 2012 Summer Olympics, and a bronze medal in the same event at the 2016 Summer Olympics.
- Katsiaryna Snytsina, Kazakhstani-born Belarusian basketball player, won a bronze medal at the 2007 European Championships
- David Tonoyan, Kazakhstan-born Armenian politician and the former Defence Minister of Armenia.
- Alexander Akmaldinov, hockey player.
- Eugen Schmidt, German politician.
- Yui Tanimura, Japan game designer

== See also ==
- Project Sapphire
