= Yumeka Wajima =

- Born: October 19, 2002 (age 23) Hokkaido, Japan
- Height: 1.56 m (5 ft 1 in)
- Weight: 50 kg (110 lb; 7 st 12 lb)
- Position: Forward
- Shoots: Right
- team: DK Peregrine
- National team: Japan
- Playing career: 2016–present

Yumeka Wajima (born October 19, 2002) is a Japanese ice hockey player. She is a member of the Japanese women's national ice hockey team, she participated in women's ice hockey tournament at the 2026 Winter Olympics.

== Playing career ==
=== International ===
At the 2026 Winter Olympics, Wajima scored a goal in a 5-2 loss versus Germany on February 7.
