= 2024 Women's Ball Hockey World Championship =

Tournament details
- Host country: Switzerland
- Cities: Visp & Raron
- Venues: 2 (in 2 host cities)
- Dates: 21–29 June 2024
- Teams: 7

Final positions
- Champions: United States (1st title)
- Runners-up: Czech Republic
- Third place: Canada
- Fourth place: Slovakia

Tournament statistics
- Games played: 20
- Attendance: 6,318 (316 per game)
- Scoring leader: Carol Ann Upshall (CAN)

Awards
- MVP: Emma Seitz (USA)

Official website
- visp-raron2024.ch

The 2024 Women's Ball Hockey World Championship was the ninth edition of the women's ball hockey tournament at the Ball Hockey World Championships. It was sanctioned by the International Street and Ball Hockey Federation (ISBHF) and organized by Swiss Street Hockey in collaboration with the ISBHF.

The United States won the first title in team history.

== Venues ==
Visp	Raron
Lonza Arena	Raiffeisen Arena
Capacity:	Capacity:

== Match officials ==
Eight officials served as referees during the tournament.

- Faye Andrews (GBR)
- Deana Cuglietta (GBR)
- Martin Černý (CZE)
- Jevgenij Danylec (CZE)
- Manon Lacasse (CAN)
- Kelly O'Dwyer (CAN)
- Radka Synková (CZE)
- Martina Volkánová (CZE)

== Group stage ==
Pos	Team	Pld	W	OTW	OTL	L	GF	GA	GD	Pts	Qualification
1	Czech Republic	6	5	0	1	0	29	5	+24	16	Semifinals
2	Canada	6	5	0	0	1	32	3	+29	15	Semifinals
3	United States	6	4	1	0	1	26	7	+19	14	Semifinals
4	Slovakia	6	3	0	0	3	12	24	−12	9	Semifinals
5	(United Kingdom) Great Britain	6	2	0	0	4	7	26	−19	6	
6	Switzerland (H)	6	0	1	0	5	4	22	−18	2	
7	United Nations	6	0	0	1	5	4	27	−23	1	

Source: ISBHF
(H) Host

=== Results ===
22 June 2024; 09:00	United States	4–2 (2-1, 2-0, 0-1)	Slovakia	Lonza Arena, Visp; Attendance: 87

Brooke Wolejko
Goalies
Soňa Kubaniová
Referees:
Radka Synková
Faye Andrews

Dobson (C. Murphy, Levin) – 07:03	1–0
	1–1	07:59 – Čorňáková (Záborská)
Lindey (Evangelous) – 08:50	2–1
Steadman (Levin, Biagetti) – 15:31	3–1
Steadman – 26:29	4–1
	4–2	37:25 – Lopušanová (Čorňáková)

8 min
Penalties
29 min
25
Shots
33

22 June 2024; 10:30	Great Britain (United Kingdom)	3–1 (0-0, 1-0, 2-1)	United Nations	Raiffeisen Arena, Raron; Attendance: 56

Samantha Bolwell
Goalies
Helena Gebrayel
Referees:
Kelly O'Dwyer
Manon Lacasse

Traill (Morrison, Towns) – 26:18	1–0
Towns (Culshaw, J. Jones) – 32:02	2–0
Taylor (Kasner-Wood, Milne) – 36:37	3–0
	3–1	37:52 – St-Martin

4 min
Penalties
6 min
28
Shots
22

22 June 2024; 16:00	Switzerland	0–6 (0-0, 0-4, 0-2)	Czech Republic	Lonza Arena, Visp; Attendance: 2048

Anja Tschirren
Goalies
Aneta Jiráčková
Referees:
Martin Černý
Jevgenij Danylec

0–1	19:32 – Kosinová (Manhartová)
0–2	22:30 – Kaltounková (Manhartová)
0–3	26:17 – Kosinová (Kaltounková, Hrušková)
0–4	27:05 – Škorpíková (Kantorová, Kubínová)
0–5	31:26 – Škorpíková (Kubínová, Kantorová)
0–6	42:11 – Kaltounková (Hrušková, Kosinová)

4 min
Penalties
0 min
13
Shots
39

22 June 2024; 19:30	Canada	5–0 (2-0, 2-0, 1-0)	United Nations	Raiffeisen Arena, Raron

Keeley Prockiw
Goalies
Helena Gebrayel
Referees:
Faye Andrews
Martina Volkánová

Vigneau Sargeant (Upshall) – 01:30	1–0
Karpenko (Guindon) – 12:01	2–0
Berzins (Upshall) – 24:23	3–0
Cerilli (Jude) – 29:57	4–0
Davis (Brumm) – 37:57	5–0

2 min
Penalties
0 min
60
Shots
2

23 June 2024; 09:00	Slovakia	4–1 (1-0, 1-1, 2-0)	(United Kingdom) Great Britain	Attendance: 25

23 June 2024; 13:30	United States	6–0 (3-0, 3-0, 0-0)	Switzerland	Attendance: 800

23 June 2024; 15:45	Slovakia	3–0 (0-0, 2-0, 1-0)	United Nations	Attendance: 72

23 June 2024; 15:45	Czech Republic	2–0 (1-0, 1-0, 0-0)	Canada

24 June 2024; 09:00	Great Britain (United Kingdom)	0–6 (0-1, 0-4, 0-1)	United States	Attendance: 90

24 June 2024; 11:15	United Nations	1–7 (0-1, 1-2, 0-4)	Czech Republic	Attendance: 40

24 June 2024; 11:15	Canada	9–0 (2-0, 5-0, 2-0)	Slovakia	Attendance: 150

24 June 2024; 18:00	Canada	4–1 (1-0, 0-0, 3-1)	Switzerland	Attendance: 690

24 June 2024; 20:15	Czech Republic	2–3 SO (0-1, 1-1, 1-0) (OT: 0-0) (SO: 0-1)	United States	Attendance: 126

== Placement round ==
=== 5th–7th place ===
27 June 2024; 10:30	Switzerland	0–2 (0-0, 0-1, 0-1)	United Nations	Raiffeisen Arena, Raron; Attendance: 121

Lea Nussbaum	Goalies	Helena Gebrayel	Referees: Manon Lacasse; Faye Andrews
0–1 / 29:16 – Hale (Watier); 0–2 / 37:05 – Ottoni (Sara)			Referees: Manon Lacasse; Faye Andrews
6 min	Penalties	25 min	Referees: Manon Lacasse; Faye Andrews
18	Shots	15	Referees: Manon Lacasse; Faye Andrews

27 June 2024; 16:30	United Nations	0–1 (0-1, 0-0, 0-0)	(United Kingdom) Great Britain	Raiffeisen Arena, Raron; Attendance: 61

Helena Gebrayel	Goalies	Samantha Bolwell	Referees: Martina Volkánová; Kelly O'Dwyer
0–1 / 02:42 – Traill (Towns, Culshaw)			Referees: Martina Volkánová; Kelly O'Dwyer
4 min	Penalties	8 min	Referees: Martina Volkánová; Kelly O'Dwyer
16	Shots	10	Referees: Martina Volkánová; Kelly O'Dwyer

==== Fifth place game ====
28 June 2024; 16:30	Great Britain (United Kingdom)	2–0 (0-0, 1-0, 1-0)	Switzerland	Raiffeisen Arena, Raron; Attendance: 123

Samantha Bolwell	Goalies	Aline Wallimann	Referees: Radka Synková; Martina Volkánová
Towns (Traill) – 16:57 / 1–0; Taylor (Ingledew) – 30:50 / 2–0			Referees: Radka Synková; Martina Volkánová
2 min	Penalties	2 min	Referees: Radka Synková; Martina Volkánová
15	Shots	14	Referees: Radka Synková; Martina Volkánová

=== Playoffs ===
==== Bracket ====
Semifinals
26 June
United States	2
Canada	1
Czech Republic	4
Slovakia	1

Final
27 June
United States	3
Czech Republic	0
Third place
Canada	7
Slovakia	1

==== Semifinals ====
27 June 2024; 08:00	Canada	1–2 OT (0-0, 0-1, 1-0) (OT: 0-1)	United States	Lonza Arena, Visp; Attendance: 250

Keeley Prockiw
Goalies
Brooke Wolejko
Referees:
Martina Volkánová
Radka Synková

	0–1	28:57 – C. Murphy (Levin)
Desmier-Pelletier (Guindon) – 35:58	1–1
	1–2	50:33 – K. Murphy (Evangelous)

6 min
Penalties
6 min
25
Shots
24

27 June 2024; 10:30	Czech Republic	4–1 (1-1, 2-0, 1-0)	Slovakia	Lonza Arena, Visp; Attendance: 200

Kateřina Černá
Goalies
Soňa Kubaniová
Referees:
Deana Cuglietta
Kelly O'Dwyer

Kaltounková (Manhartová, Herzigová) – 12:02	1–0
	1–1	13:04 – Čorňáková (Záborská, Dzurinová)
Herzigová (Manhartová, Kaltounková) – 18:25	2–1
Hrušková (Kaltounková, Kosinová) – 28:46	3–1
Kaltounková (Manhartová, Hrušková) – 30:17	4–1

6 min
Penalties
4 min
21
Shots
8

==== Bronze medal game ====
28 June 2024; 13:00	Canada	7–1 (2-0, 4-0, 1-1)	Slovakia	Lonza Arena, Visp; Attendance: 350

Julianna Thomson
Goalies
Andrea Pastorková Rišová
Soňa Kubaniová
Referees:
Deana Cuglietta
Manon Lacasse

Upshall (Brumm) – 01:12	1–0
Vigneau Sargeant (Upshall, Ryan) – 11:04	2–0
Upshall (Bannon, Jue) – 16:53	3–0
Jue (Upshall, Karpenko) – 21:42	4–0
Bannon (Upshall) – 28:19	5–0
Upshall (Karpenko, Bannon) – 28:28	6–0
	6–1	36:42 – Dzurinová
Upshall (Karpenko, Jue) – 37:27	7–1

12 min
Penalties
8 min
33
Shots
11

==== Final ====
28 June 2024; 20:30	Czech Republic	0–3 (0-1, 0-2, 0-0)	United States	Lonza Arena, Visp; Attendance: 1004

Kateřina Černá
Aneta Jiráčková
Goalies
Brooke Wolejko
Referees:
Kelly O'Dwyer
Faye Andrews

0–1	10:53 – Seitz (Levin, Dobson)
0–2	25:46 – Fortier (Bilger, Monahan)
0–3	28:03 – Vakos (Dobson, C. Murphy)

6 min
Penalties
0 min
15
Shots
10

== Final standings ==
Rank	Nation
1st place, gold medalist(s)	United States
2nd place, silver medalist(s)	Czech Republic
3rd place, bronze medalist(s)	Canada
4	Slovakia
5	(United Kingdom) Great Britain
6	Switzerland
7	United Nations

== Statistics ==
=== Scoring leaders ===
The following table displays the top-twelve point scorers of the tournament, sorted by points, then goals. The top scorer from each team not represented in the top-twelve is also displayed, alongside their overall scoring rank (in italics).

GP = Games played; G = Goals; A = Assists; Pts = Points; +/− = Plus/minus; PIM = Penalties in minutes; Pos = Position

Rank		Player	GP	G	A	Pts	PIM	Pos
1	(Canada)	Carol Ann Upshall	8	10	10	20	0	F
2	(Czech Republic)	Kristýna Kaltounková	8	9	8	17	14	F
3	(Czech Republic)	Barbora Hrušková	8	5	9	14	4	F
4	(Czech Republic)	Lucie Manhartová	8	3	11	14	2	F
5	(Canada)	Chelsea Karpenko	8	7	6	13	2	F
6	(Canada)	Neleh Vigneau Sargeant	8	5	5	10	2	F
7	(United States)	Emma Seitz	8	7	1	8	0	F
8	(Czech Republic)	Karolína Kosinová	8	3	5	8	2	D
9	(United States)	Katherine Murphy	8	4	3	7	0	F
10	(Canada)	Geneviève Bannon	8	2	5	7	6	F
11	(Canada)	Elysia Desmier-Pelletier	8	5	1	6	2	F
12	(Slovakia)	Alexandra Čorňáková	8	3	3	6	2	F
12	(United States)	Becky Dobson	8	3	3	6	6	F
12	(United Kingdom)	Stephanie Towns	8	3	3	6	6	F
47	(United Nations)	Ashley Sara	8	1	1	2	0	F
47	(United Nations)	Maude Watier	8	1	1	2	2	F
47	(United Nations)	Olivia Hale	8	1	1	2	4	F
52	(Switzerland)	Schayene Gahler	8	0	2	2	0	F

=== Goalkeepers ===
The following table presents the twelve goalkeepers who recorded the highest save percentages while playing a minimum of one hundred minutes in net.

GP = Games played in; Min = Time on ice in minutes; SV = Saves; GA = Goals against; Sv% = Save percentage; GpG = Goals per game

		Player	GP	Min	SV	GA	Sv%	GpG
1	(Canada)	Keeley Prockiw	4	141	41	2	95.35	0.85
2	(United States)	Maxie Weisz	4	133	34	2	94.44	0.90
3	(United States)	Brooke Woljeko	6	191	83	5	94.32	1.57
4	(Czech Republic)	Aneta Jiráčková	5	109	29	2	93.55	1.10
5	(Canada)	Julianna Thomson	4	164	37	3	92.50	1.10
6	(United Nations)	Helena Gebrayel	7	274	165	17	90.66	3.73
7	(United Kingdom)	Samantha Bolwell	8	345	163	19	89.56	3.30
8	(Czech Republic)	Kateřina Černá	6	208	42	5	89.36	1.44
9	(Switzerland)	Anja Tschirren	5	139	74	9	89.16	3.89
10	(Switzerland)	Lea Nussbaum	5	133	86	11	88.66	4.95
11	(Slovakia)	Soňa Kubaniová	5	180	79	18	81.44	6.00
12	(Slovakia)	Andrea Pastorková Rišová	4	110	48	11	81.36	5.99

== Awards ==
Individual awards

Award	Player
Best Goalkeeper	Brooke Wolejko (USA)
Best Defender	Petra Herzigová (CZE)
Best Forward	Kristýna Kaltounková (CZE)
MVP	Emma Seitz (USA)
Top scorer	Carol Ann Upshall (CAN)

All-Star team

Position	Player
Goalkeeper	Helena Gebrayel (UN)
Defenders	Casey Traill (GBR)
Defenders	Rebecca Burgdorfer (SUI)
Forward	Neleh Vigneau Sargeant (CAN)
Forward	Patrícia Mária Dzurinová (SVK)
Forward	Katherine Murphy (USA)

== Rosters ==
Team	Roster
Canada	Goalkeepers: Maggie Jones, Keeley Prockiw, Julianna Thomson; Defenders: Heather Berzins, Carley Blomberg, Kara Brumm, Kristen Cooze, Corie Jacobson, Emily Jude, Melanie Jue, Jill Mason; Forwards: Geneviève Bannon, Angie Cerilli, Sarah Davis, Elysia Desmier-Pelletier, Tawnya Guindon, Jenna Hendrikx, Chelsea Karpenko, Amanda Kean, Jenna Proulx, Haley Ryan, Jenni Simpson, Carol Ann Upshall, Neleh Vigneau Sargeant; Head coach: Maryelle Hannam; Assistant coaches: Dawn Tulk, Emilie Morter
Czech Republic	Goalkeepers: Kateřina Černá, Aneta Jiráčková, Barbora Voříšková; Defenders: Veronika Červíková, Petra Herzigová, Karolína Kašparová, Karolína Kosinová, Zuzana Martinů, Kateřina Ondrová, Tereza Radová, Lucie Rejlová; Forwards: Barbora Hrušková, Tereza Ištoková, Kristýna Kaltounková, Andrea Kantorová, Tereza Kotlíková, Kateřina Kotyrová, Lucie Kubínová, Martina Landová, Lucie Manhartová, Natalie Pangerlová, Natálie Pavlačková, Karolína Procházková, Patricie Škorpíková; Head coach: Michal Broulík; Assistant coach: Václav Tůma
(United Kingdom) Great Britain	Goalkeepers: Samantha Bolwell, Caitlin Woolley; Defenders: Hannah Byrom, Laura Dance, Hannah Ingledew, Elizabeth Milne, Kaitlyn Morrison, Casey Traill, Lydia Walsh; Forwards: Kate Bateman, Isabelle Bennett, Victoria Carson, Abbie Culshaw, Alisha Harper, Alice Jones, Jessica Jones, Becky Kasner-Wood, Amy Kingsbury, Hayley Reynolds, Hazel Taylor, Stephanie Towns, Linaia Trusswell; Head coach: Ali Cree; Assistant coaches: Rachel Stockdale, Jenny Hehir
Slovakia	Goalkeepers: Carmen Dráfiová, Soňa Kubaniová, Andrea Pastorková Rišová; Defenders: Júlia Čillíková, Patrícia Mária Dzurinová, Alexandra Gaborčíková, Sofia Hambálková, Lucia Martincová, Nina Štrbáková, Alexandra Turcsányiová, Lucia Záborská; Forwards: Alexandra Čorňáková, Anna Džurňáková, Laura Hambálková, Laura Lacková, Aleksandra Lidskaia, Nela Lopušanová, Paula Mandelíková, Alexandra Mateičková, Sarah Nilabovičová, Sofia Podoláková, Annamária Suráková, Nina Ševčíková, Kristína Taricsová, Michaela Vršková; Head coach: Marián Hambálek; Assistant coach: Daniel Lipár
Switzerland	Goalkeepers: Lea Nussbaum, Anja Tschirren, Aline Wallimann; Defenders: Sabrina Arn, Angela Baumgartner, Corin Bregy, Rebecca Burgdorfer,Tess Décaille, Célie Hofer, Stefanie Krähenbühl, Stefanie Kummer, Jamie Roth, Giulia Scaglioso; Forwards: Emma Berri, Heike Bissig, Schayene Gahler, Marylin Janjic, Anina Kleiner, Larissa Lüthi, Martina Müller, Manon Rey, Chantal Rätz, Chiara Villiger, Elise Vuille, Céline Zbinden; Head coach: Gerhard Christen; Assistant coaches: Daniel Feuz, Beat Lüthi
United Nations	Goalkeepers: Helena Gebrayel (LEB), Melanie Ottoni (); Defenders: Andrea D'Ambrosio, Erika Oliveira, Amanda Victoria Ottoni, Sonia St-Martin, Lisa-Marie Tanguay; Forwards: Melissa Barbiero, Emilie Beaudoin, Michelle Blom, Roxane Dufayard, Monika Estrela, Linda Guerrera, Olivia Hale, Anita Marchal, Ashley Sara, Maya Lena Schaeffer, Maude Watier; Head coach: Nicodemo Sbarra; Assistant coaches: Nick Katsifolis, Sebastian Sicuso
United States	Goalkeepers: Shelby Guinard, Maxie Weisz, Brooke Wolejko; Defenders: Victoria Biagetti, Pam Bilger, Hatharina Helling, Mya Kearns, Megan Lavery, Karen Levin, Marissa Massaro, Chelsea Monahan, Elena Orlando; Forwards: Sophia Agostinelli, Becky Dobson, Madelyn Evangelous, Megan Fortier, Sarah Hughson, Lisa Kilroy, Hannah Lindey, Jasmine Martinez, Colleen Murphy, Katherine Murphy, Emma Seitz, Taylor Steadman, Alexandra Vakos; Head coach: Jennifer Wilson; Assistant coaches: Matt Fair, Jacob Denne
