= 2026 Women's Ball Hockey World Championship =

Tournament details
- Host country: Czech Republic
- City: Ostrava
- Venues: 2 (in 1 host city)
- Dates: 20 – 27 June 2026
- Teams: 6

Final positions
- Champions: United States (2nd title)
- Runners-up: Czech Republic
- Third place: Canada
- Fourth place: Slovakia

Tournament statistics
- Games played: 20
- Goals scored: 148 (7.4 per game)
- Attendance: 8,890 (445 per game)
- Scoring leader: Carol Ann Upshall (CAN) (20 points)

Awards
- MVP: Emma Seitz (USA)

Official website
- ostrava2026.com

The 2026 Women's Ball Hockey World Championship (Czech: Mistrovství světa v hokejbalu žen 2026) was the tenth edition of the Women's Ball Hockey World Championship. It was organized by the International Street and Ball Hockey Federation, it was hosted in Ostrava, Czech Republic from 20 to 27 June 2026.

The national teams of six countries participated in the tournament: Canada, the Czech Republic, Great Britain, Slovakia, Switzerland, and the United States.

The United States won the championship for the second time, after beating the Czech Republic by a score of 1–0 in the final. Canada claimed bronze with a commanding 7–1 victory over Slovakia. Fifth place was Great Britain in a surprise shutout over Switzerland.

== Venues ==
Ostrava
Ostravar Aréna Capacity: 10,004	Multifunkční hala (Multifunctional Arena) Capacity: 502
Ostravar Aréna	

== Match officials ==
Six referees were selected for the tournament.

- Faye Andrews (GBR)
- Deana Cuglietta (GBR)
- Kathleen McCarthy (CAN)
- Kellie O’Dwyer (CAN)
- Erika Perčinová Daňková (CZE)
- Radka Synková (CZE)

== Group stage ==
Pos	Team	Pld	W	OTW	OTL	L	GF	GA	GD	Pts	Qualification
1	Czech Republic (H)	5	4	1	0	0	35	8	+27	14	Semifinals
2	United States	5	3	1	1	0	25	4	+21	12	Semifinals
3	Canada	5	3	0	1	1	40	11	+29	10	Semifinals
4	Slovakia	5	2	0	0	3	14	20	−6	6	Semifinals
5	Switzerland	5	1	0	0	4	9	36	−27	3	
6	(United Kingdom) Great Britain	5	0	0	0	5	4	48	−44	0	

Source: ISBHF
(H) Host

=== Results ===
20 June 2026; 17:30	Czech Republic	5–1 (0-1, 2-0, 3-0)	Slovakia	Ostravar Aréna, Ostrava; Attendance: 1333

Kateřina Dvořáková
Goalies
Nina Cengelová
Referees:
Faye Andrews
Kelly O'Dwyer

	0–1	02:48 – Ševčíková (Ermak)
Škorpíková (Kubínová) – 19:06	1–1
Kubínová – 19:50	2–1
Krásová (Seroiszková, Herzigová) – 32:46	3–1
Kantorová (Radová, Kubínová) – 36:40	4–1
Škorpíková (Kantorová) – 44:36	5–1

8 min
Penalties
10 min
37
Shots
7

21 June 2026; 08:30	United States	10–0 (2-0, 3-0, 5-0)	Switzerland	Ostravar Aréna, Ostrava; Attendance: 205

Maxie Weisz
Goalies
Alina Kaiser
Lea Nussbaum
Referees:
Erika Daňková Perčinová
Radka Synková

Seitz (C. Murphy) – 06:48	1–0
Llanes (Nichols, Vakos) – 14:17	2–0
Seitz (Hughson, Kosakowski) – 15:30	3–0
Steadman – 27:46	4–0
Seitz (C. Murphy) – 29:04	5–0
Seitz (Kosakowski) – 30:24	6–0
Llanes (Vakos, Nichols) – 33:18	7–0
Llanes (Kosakowski, Kearns) – 38:13	8–0
Steadman (C. Murphy, Schneiderhan) – 41:07	9–0
Horne (Nichols, Frade) – 42:40	10–0

8 min
Penalties
10 min
52
Shots
11

21 June 2026; 10:45	Slovakia	5–1 (1-0, 2-0, 2-1)	(United Kingdom) Great Britain	Ostravar Aréna, Ostrava; Attendance: 184

Carmen Dráfiová
Goalies
Samantha Bolwell
Referees:
Kelly O'Dwyer
Kathleen McCarthy

Kubáňová (Dzurinová, Lidskaia) – 08:02	1–0
Lipnická (Hambálková, Podoláková) – 21:20	2–0
Taricsová (Ermak) – 24:24	3–0
Dzurinová (Lidskaia, Donovalová) – 33:24	4–0
Tomečková (Lacková, Taricsová) – 33:48	5–0
	5–1	44:13 – Towns (Kasner-Wood, Culshaw)

6 min
Penalties
8 min
27
Shots
10

21 June 2026; 18:00	Canada	4–6 (2-2, 0-1, 2-3)	Czech Republic	Ostravar Aréna, Ostrava; Attendance: 579

Maggie Jones
Goalies
Aneta Jiráčková
Referees:
Faye Andrews
Deana Cuglietta

	0–1	01:39 – Kubínová (Kantorová, Škorpíková)
Upshall (Davis) – 04:37	1–1
	1–2	11:05 – Herzigová (Seroiszková)
Upshall (McKnight) – 11:58	2–2
	2–3	20:24 – Seroiszková (Herzigová, Hrušková)
	2–4	36:22 – Kosinová (Kubínová)
Page (Laforge) – 42:23	3–4
	3–5	42:46 – Hrušková (Herzigová, Manhartová)
	3–6	43:18 – Kubínová (Radová, Kantorová)
Karpenko – 44:09	4–6

6 min
Penalties
6 min
15
Shots
31

22 June 2026; 10:45	Slovakia	1–9 (0-2, 0-2, 1-5)	Canada	Ostravar Aréna, Ostrava; Attendance: 626

Carmen Dráfiová
Soňa Kubaniová
Goalies
Alyshah Beutler
Referees:
Faye Andrews
Radka Synková

	0–1	03:07 – McKnight (Upshall, Page)
	0–2	14:48 – Upshall (McKnight)
	0–3	28:25 – Upshall (C. Blomberg, Page)
	0–4	29:19 – Laforge (Kean)
	0–5	31:11 – Clarke (Proulx, Jacobson)
	0–6	33:28 – McKnight (Upshall, Mason)
Lidskaia – 35:01	1–6
	1–7	37:34 – Davis (Upshall, McKnight)
	1–8	41:31 – Vigneau Sargeant (Karpenko, Page)
	1–9	44:22 – Jacobson (A. Blomberg)

8 min
Penalties
6 min
12
Shots
39

22 June 2026; 15:00	Great Britain (United Kingdom)	0–7 (0-2, 0-3, 0-2)	United States	Multifunkční aréna, Ostrava; Attendance: 153

Samantha Bolwell
Scarlett Richardson
Goalies
Shelby Guinard
Referees:
Deana Cuglietta
Erika Daňková Perčinová

0–1	06:20 – Seitz (Schneiderhan)
0–2	11:02 – Vakos (Steadman, Llanes)
0–3	17:17 – Steadman (Vakos)
0–4	25:31 – K. Murphy (C. Murphy)
0–5	28:57 – Kosakowski (Vakos)
0–6	32:44 – Vakos (Steadman, Kosakowski)
0–7	43:24 – Steadman (C. Murphy, Schneiderhan)

4 min
Penalties
4 min
3
Shots
44

22 June 2026; 19:45	Switzerland	2–5 (0-2, 1-0, 1-3)	Czech Republic	Ostravar Aréna, Ostrava; Attendance: 513

Lea Nussbaum
Goalies
Kateřina Dvořáková
Referees:
Kelly O'Dwyer
Kathleen McCarthy

	0–1	06:18 – Bartáková (Herzigová, Manhartová)
	0–2	12:12 – Landová (Krásová, Kotlíková)
Villiger (Berri, Gilomen) – 28:05	1–2
	1–3	30:25 – Bartáková (Kotyrová, Manhartová)
	1–4	32:48 – Kotyrová (Bartáková, Herzigová)
Leuenberger – 40:31	2–4
	2–5	42:49 – Krásová (Kotlíková)

4 min
Penalties
8 min
13
Shots
37

23 June 2026; 10:45	Great Britain (United Kingdom)	3–5 (0-2, 0-2, 3-1)	Switzerland	Ostravar Aréna, Ostrava; Attendance: 258

Samantha Bolwell
Goalies
Nadine Atalay
Alina Kaiser
Referees:
Erika Daňková Perčinová
Kathleen McCarthy

	0–1	06:37 – Kistler (Gahler)
	0–2	13:08 – Kistler (Heuscher, Gahler)
	0–3	25:00 – Kistler (Gahler)
	0–4	29:59 – Gahler (Messer)
	0–5	34:08 – Gahler (Herzog, Kistler)
Hobbins (Eastwood, Harper) – 37:13	1–5
Culshaw (Towns, Walsh) – 38:58	2–5
Walsh (Culshaw, Traill) – 41:40	3–5

4 min
Penalties
6 min
19
Shots
34

23 June 2026; 15:30	United States	3–2 OT (1-1, 0-1, 1-0) (OT: 1-0)	Canada	Ostravar Aréna, Ostrava; Attendance: 284

Maxie Weisz
Goalies
Alyshah Beutler
Referees:
Deana Cuglietta
Radka Synková

Schneiderhan (Forrest) – 06:24	1–0
	1–1	10:59 – Senger (Jacobson)
	1–2	27:53 – Karpenko (Berzins)
Seitz (Hughson) – 40:07	2–2
Vakos (Steadman) – 49:17	3–2

8 min
Penalties
2 min
24
Shots
35

24 June 2026; 10:45	Czech Republic	2–1 SO (0-0, 1-0, 0-1) (OT: 0-0) (SO: 1-0)	United States	Ostravar Aréna, Ostrava; Attendance: 1789

Kateřina Dvořáková	Goalies	Maxie Weisz	Referees: Faye Andrews; Kathleen McCarthy
Kantorová (Kosinová, Kubínová) – 23:11 / 1–0; / 1–1 / 39:45 – K. Murphy (C. Murphy, Kosakowski)			Referees: Faye Andrews; Kathleen McCarthy
Seroiszková; Kubínová	Shootout	Seitz; (miss) K. Murphy	Referees: Faye Andrews; Kathleen McCarthy
4 min	Penalties	4 min	Referees: Faye Andrews; Kathleen McCarthy
24	Shots	15	Referees: Faye Andrews; Kathleen McCarthy

24 June 2026; 11:45	Switzerland	1–7 (0-3, 1-2, 0-2)	Slovakia	Multifunkční aréna, Ostrava; Attendance: 201

Alina Kaiser
Lea Nussbaum
Goalies
Soňa Kubaniová
Referees:
Kelly O'Dwyer
Radka Synková

	0–1	01:56 – Hambálková
	0–2	03:14 – Donovalová (Lidskaia)
	0–3	03:37 – Taricsová (Džurňáková)
	0–4	20:57 – Džurňáková (Šebestová)
Gilomen (Leuenberger) – 21:58	1–4
	1–5	29:01 – Dzurinová (Hambálková)
	1–6	37:06 – Lacková (Benejová, Ermak)
	1–7	43:55 – Lipnická (Lidskaia)

29 min
Penalties
6 min
13
Shots
21

24 June 2026; 13:00	Canada	14–0 (6-0, 5-0, 3-0)	(United Kingdom) Great Britain	Ostravar Aréna, Ostrava; Attendance: 120

Maggie Jones
Goalies
Samantha Bolwell
Scarlett Richardson
Referees:
Deana Cuglietta
Erika Daňková Perčinová

Proulx (Vigneau Sargeant, McKnight) – 00:47	1–0
Laforge (Upshall, Mason) – 03:09	2–0
Kean (Clarke, Berzins) – 06:07	3–0
Davis (Kean) – 11:22	4–0
Guindon (Karpenko, A. Blomberg) – 14:20	5–0
Karpenko (Guindon) – 14:37	6–0
Upshall (Laforge, Page) – 19:03	7–0
Guindon (Karpenko, A. Blomberg) – 20:35	8–0
Karpenko (Jacobson) – 24:14	9–0
Vigneau Sargeant (McKnight) – 26:41	10–0
Laforge (Upshall, McKnight) – 29:59	11–0
Upshall (Page) – 33:13	12–0
Davis (Laforge, Upshall) – 39:49	13–0
Davis (McKnight) – 43:33	14–0

2 min
Penalties
8 min
42
Shots
6

25 June 2026; 15:45	Canada	11–1 (5-1, 3-0, 3-0)	Switzerland	Ostravar Aréna, Ostrava; Attendance: 138

Alyshah Beutler
Goalies
Alina Kaiser
Referees:
Faye Andrews
Erika Daňková Perčinová

Vigneau Sargeant (Senger, Proulx) – 05:53	1–0
Karpenko (Page) – 09:02	2–0
	2–1	12:32 – Gahler (Kummer, Kistler)
McKnight (Miller, Upshall) – 13:07	3–1
Kean (McKnight, Upshall) – 13:53	4–1
Guindon (Proulx) – 14:28	5–1
Page (Miller) – 16:56	6–1
A. Blomberg (Miller, Vigneau Sargeant) – 23:31	7–1
Vigneau Sargeant (Page) – 28:18	8–1
Page (Vigneau Sargeant) – 35:57	9–1
Davis (Upshall, C. Blomberg) – 38:33	10–1
Guindon (Senger) – 43:53	11–1

8 min
Penalties
8 min
54
Shots
9

25 June 2026; 18:15	Great Britain (United Kingdom)	0–17 (0-4, 0-9, 0-4)	Czech Republic	Ostravar Aréna, Ostrava; Attendance: 1129

Samantha Bolwell
Scarlett Richardson
Goalies
Kateřina Černá
Referees:
Kelly O'Dwyer
Kathleen McCarthy

0–1	07:33 – Kotyrová (Landová, Krásová)
0–2	10:06 – Škorpíková (Radová, Kantorová)
0–3	13:29 – Manhartová (Bartáková, Šťástková)
0–4	13:45 – Kantorová (Kubínová, Škorpíková)
0–5	15:06 – Krásová
0–6	18:24 – Kubínová (Škorpíková, Radová)
0–7	19:18 – Procházková
0–8	20:32 – Bartáková (Manhartová, Šťástková)
0–9	21:41 – Seroiszková (Bartáková, Manhartová)
0–10	22:35 – Kantorová (Radová, Škorpíková)
0–11	23:56 – Landová (Pangerlová)
0–12	25:12 – Manhartová (Bartáková, Seroiszková)
0–13	28:29 – Krásová (Landová)
0–14	31:46 – Krásová (Landová, Pangerlová)
0–15	37:27 – Bartáková (Kotlíková)
0–16	38:38 – Kantorová (Kubínová, Škorpíková)
0–17	42:49 – Seroiszková (Kubínová)

0 min
Penalties
0 min
4
Shots
40

25 June 2026; 20:30	United States	4–0 (1-0, 2-0, 1-0)	Slovakia	Ostravar Aréna, Ostrava; Attendance: 100

Shelby Guinard
Goalies
Soňa Kubaniová
Referees:
Deana Cuglietta
Radka Synková

Seitz (Llanes, C. Murphy) – 04:43	1–0
K. Murphy – 26:03	2–0
Schneiderhan (Rothwein) – 29:45	3–0
K. Murphy (Kearns) – 32:27	4–0

2 min
Penalties
2 min
24
Shots
9

== Placement round ==
=== Fifth place game ===
Following a group stage in which they failed to earn a single point, Great Britain achieved a minor upset with their victory over Switzerland in the fifth place game. The win was secured with a 24-save shutout performance from goalkeeper Samantha Bolwell and was supported by goals from Alice Jones, Stephanie Towns, and Caitlin Eastwood.

26 June 2026; 12:30	Switzerland	0–3 (0-0, 0-1, 0-2)	(United Kingdom) Great Britain	Multifunkční aréna, Ostrava; Attendance: 71

Nadine Atalay
Goalies
Samantha Bolwell
Referees:
Erika Daňková Perčinová
Kelly O'Dwyer

0–1	22:39 – Jones (Culshaw)
0–2	39:30 – Towns (Jones, Culshaw)
0–3	43:39 – Eastwood (Harper, McLean)

4 min
Penalties
8 min
24
Shots
5

=== Playoffs ===
==== Bracket ====
Semifinals
26 June
United States	3
Canada	2
Czech Republic	4
Slovakia	0

Final
27 June
United States	1
Czech Republic	0
Third place
Canada	7
Slovakia	1

==== Semifinals ====
26 June 2026; 15:15	United States	3–2 (1-0, 0-2, 2-0)	Canada	Ostravar Aréna, Ostrava; Attendance: 300

Maxie Weisz
Goalies
Alyshah Beutler
Referees:
Deana Cuglietta
Radka Synková

Frade (Kosakowski) – 13:04	1-0
	1-1	18:28 – McKnight
	1-2	29:22 – McKnight (C. Blomberg, Upshall)
Kearns (Kosakowski, Nichols) – 35:21	2-2
Seitz (C. Murphy) – 41:15	3-2

6 min
Penalties
6 min
21
Shots
13

26 June 2026; 20:15	Czech Republic	4–0 (1-0, 2-0, 1-0)	Slovakia	Ostravar Aréna, Ostrava; Attendance: 1983

Kateřina Dvořáková
Goalies
Nina Cengelová
Referees:
Faye Andrews
Kathleen McCarthy

Procházková (E. Veselá, Kotlíková) – 09:57	1–0
Seroiszková (Bartáková) – 19:29	2–0
Krásová (Kotlíková) – 23:27	3–0
Manhartová (Bartáková) – 42:20	4–0

8 min
Penalties
6 min
25
Shots
12

==== Bronze medal game ====
27 June 2026; 17:00	Canada	7–1 (3-0, 2-1, 2-0)	Slovakia	Ostravar Aréna, Ostrava; Attendance: 1223

Alyshah Beutler
Goalies
Nina Cengelová
Soňa Kubaniová
Referees:
Faye Andrews
Radka Synková

Upshall (McKnight, Kean) – 04:25	1–0
Kean (McKnight) – 06:15	2–0
Karpenko (Upshall) – 08:05	3–0
Kean (Jacobson) – 19:05	4–0
Upshall (Karpenko) – 23:26	5–0
	5–1	24:55 – Donovalová (Lidskaia, Džurňáková)
Upshall (McKnight, C. Blomberg)	6–1
Vigneau Sargeant (Karpenko, Jacobson) – 41:01	7–1

4 min
Penalties
6 min
23
Shots
15

==== Final ====
27 June 2026; 19:30	Czech Republic	0–1 (0-0, 0-1, 0-0)	United States	Ostravar Aréna, Ostrava; Attendance: 3012

Kateřina Dvořáková	Goalies	Maxie Weisz	Referees: Deana Cuglietta; Kathleen McCarthy
0–1 / 17:21 – Schneiderhan (Steadman, Vakos)			Referees: Deana Cuglietta; Kathleen McCarthy
0 min	Penalties	2 min	Referees: Deana Cuglietta; Kathleen McCarthy
12	Shots	14	Referees: Deana Cuglietta; Kathleen McCarthy

== Final standings ==
Rank	Country
1st place, gold medalist(s)	United States
2nd place, silver medalist(s)	Czech Republic
3rd place, bronze medalist(s)	Canada
4	Slovakia
5	(United Kingdom) Great Britain
6	Switzerland

== Statistics ==
=== Scoring leaders ===
The following table displays the top-ten point scorers of the tournament, sorted by points, then goals. The top scorer from each team not represented in the top-ten and the top scoring defender are also displayed.

GP = Games played; G = Goals; A = Assists; Pts = Points; +/− = Plus/minus; PIM = Penalties in minutes; Pos = Position

Rank		Player	GP	G	A	Pts	PIM	Pos
1	(Canada)	Carol Ann Upshall	7	9	11	20	0	F
2	(Canada)	Kaitlyn McKnight	7	5	11	16	0	F
3	(Czech Republic)	Lucie Kubínová	7	5	7	12	2	F
4	(Canada)	Chelsea Karpenko	7	6	5	11	2	F
5	(Czech Republic)	Barbora Bartáková	7	4	6	10	0	F
6	(Canada)	Angelique Page	7	3	7	10	8	F
7	(Czech Republic)	Andrea Kantorová	7	5	4	9	0	F
8	(United States)	Emma Seitz	7	8	0	8	0	F
9	(Czech Republic)	Michaela Krásová	7	6	2	8	0	F
10	(Canada)	Neleh Vigneau Sargeant	7	5	3	8	0	F
15	(United States)	Arianna Kosakowski	7	1	7	8	0	D
20	(Switzerland)	Schayene Gahler	6	3	3	6	0	F
23	(Slovakia)	Aleksandra Lidskaia	7	1	5	6	8	F
30	(United Kingdom)	Abbie Culshaw	6	1	4	5	0	F

=== Goalkeepers ===
The ten goalkeepers of the tournament with the highest percentage of shots saved are included in the following table, sorted by save percentage.

Min = Time on ice (minutes:seconds); SV = Saves; GA = Goals against; Sv% = Save percentage; GpG = Goals per game

Rank		Player	GP	Min	SV	GA	Sv%	GpG
1	(United States)	Shelby Guinard	2	90:00	12	0	100.00	0.00
2	(Czech Republic)	Kateřina Černá	1	45:00	4	0	100.00	0.00
3	(United States)	Maxie Weisz	5	234:00	89	5	94.68	1.28
4	(Czech Republic)	Kateřina Dvořáková	5	230:00	56	5	91.80	1.31
5	(Canada)	Alyshah Beutler	5	228:00	71	9	88.75	2.37
6	(Slovakia)	Carmen Dráfiová	2	75:00	33	5	86.84	4.00
7	(Canada)	Maggie Jones	2	90:00	31	6	83.78	4.00
8	(Slovakia)	Nina Cengelová	3	107:00	62	13	82.67	7.30
9	(United Kingdom)	Samantha Bolwell	6	200:00	116	26	81.69	7.81
10	(Switzerland)	Lea Nussbaum	3	78:00	48	12	80.00	9.27

== Awards ==
Individual awards

Award	Player
Best Goalkeeper	Maxie Weisz (USA)
Best Defender	Klára Seroiszková (CZE)
Best Forward	Lucie Kubínová (CZE)
MVP	Emma Seitz (USA)
Top scorer	Carol Ann Upshall (CAN)

All-Star team

Position	Player
Goalkeeper	Kateřina Dvořáková (CZE)
Defenders	Arianna Kosakowski (USA)
Defenders	Petra Herzigová (CZE)
Forward	Aleksandra Lidskaia (SVK)
Forward	Kaitlyn McKnight (CAN)
Forward	Taylor Steadman (USA)

Sources: Ostrava 2026, ISBHF

== Rosters ==
Rank	Team	Roster
1st place, gold medalist(s)	United States	Goalkeepers: Shelby Guinard, Maxie Weisz; Defenders: Rose Alleva, Pam Bilger, Bailey Horne, Mya Kearns, Arianna Kosakowski, Marissa Massaro, Elena Orlando; Forwards: Sophia Agostinelli, Madelyn Evangelous, Jocelyn Forrest, Haley Frade, Sarah Hughson, Lisa Kilroy, Rachel Llanes, Colleen Murphy (C), Katherine Murphy, Madison Nichols, Madison Rothwein, Brooklyn Schneiderhan, Emma Seitz, Taylor Steadman, Alexandra Vakos; Head coach: Jennifer Wilson; Assistant coaches: Jake Denn, Matt Fair
2nd place, silver medalist(s)	Czech Republic	Goalkeepers: Kateřina Černá, Kateřina Dvořáková, Aneta Jiráčková; Defenders: Petra Herzigová, Karolína Kosinová, Zuzana Martinů, Kateřina Ondrová, Tereza Radová, Klára Seroiszková, Natálie Veselá; Forwards: Barbora Bartáková, Vanesa Halbrštátová, Barbora Hrušková, Andrea Kantorová, Tereza Kotlíková, Kateřina Kotyrová, Michaela Krásová, Lucie Kubínová, Martina Landová, Lucie Manhartová (C), Natalie Pangerlová, Karolína Procházková, Patricie Škorpíková, Věra Šťástková, Eliška Veselá; Head coach: Michal Broulík; Assistant coaches: Václav Tůma, Jakub Hnátek
3rd place, bronze medalist(s)	Canada	Goalkeepers: Alyshah Beutler, Maggie Jones; Defenders: Heather Berzins, Alicia Blomberg, Corie Jacobson, Jill Mason, Jacklyn Miller, Gina Munford, Kalista Senger; Forwards: Carley Blomberg, Shae-Lynn Clarke, Sarah Davis, Tawnya Guindon, Chelsea Karpenko, Amanda Kean (C), Caroline Laforge, Kaitlyn McKnight, Angelique Page, Jenna Proulx, Carol Ann Upshall, Neleh Vigneau Sargeant; Head coach: Mandi Duhamel; Assistant coaches: Reagan Fischer, Misty Seastrom
4	Slovakia	Goalkeepers: Nina Cengelová, Carmen Dráfiová, Soňa Kubaniová; Defenders: Hana Benejová, Darja Ermak, Sofia Hambálková, Lucia Martincová, Sarah Nilabovičová, Emma Šebestová, Nina Štrbáková, Lucia Záborská; Forwards: Ema Donovalová, Patrícia Mária Dzurinová, Anna Džurňáková (C), Laura Hambálková, Alexandra Jovanovová, Dorota Kubáňová, Laura Lacková, Aleksandra Lidskaia, Lilly Laura Lipnická, Jana Pavlíková, Sofia Podoláková, Nina Ševčíková, Kristína Taricsová, Zuzana Tomečková; Head coach: Marián Hambálek; Assistant coach: Daniel Lipár
5	(United Kingdom) Great Britain	Goalkeepers: Samantha Bolwell, Scarlett Richardson; Defenders: Alex Browell, Emma Dixon, Iona Harrison, Taylor McLean, Casey Traill (A), Lydia Walsh; Forwards: Kate Bateman, Abbie Culshaw (C), Caitlin Eastwood, Alisha Harper, Ila Hobbins, Alice Jones, Becky Kasner-Wood, Hazel Taylor, Stephanie Towns; Player-coaches: Becky Kasner-Wood, Stephanie Towns; Coach: Amanda Murdoch
6	Switzerland	Goalkeepers: Nadine Atalay, Alina Kaiser, Lea Nussbaum; Defenders: Angela Baumgartner, Corin Bregy, Rebecca Burgdorfer, Romy Bühler, Jana Heuscher, Célie Hofer, Stefanie Kummer, Mira Leibundgut, Céline Lienhardt, Olivia Messer; Forwards: Emma Berri, Heike Bissig, Schayene Gahler, Chanel Gilomen, Olivia Herzog, Noemi Kistler, Nadja Leuenberger, Martina Müller, Manon Rey, Chantal Rätz, Chiara Villiger, Elise Vuille; Head coach: Perrine Bonzon; Assistant coach: Céline Apothéloz
