= Great Britain women's national ball hockey team =

Great Britain
- Nickname: Team GB
- Association: Ball Hockey UK
- Head coach: Becky Kasner-Wood
- Assistants: Amanda Murdoch; Stephanie Towns
- Captain: Abbie Culshaw
- Team colors: Blue, red, white

First international
- Slovakia 12–0 (United Kingdom) Great Britain (Bratislava, Slovakia • 19 June 2011)

Biggest win
- Great Britain (United Kingdom) 6–1 Lebanon (Laval, Canada • 21 June 2022)

Biggest defeat
- Czech Republic 17–0 (United Kingdom) Great Britain (Ostrava, Czech Republic • 25 June 2026)

World Championship
- Appearances: 8 (first in 2011)
- Best result: 5th (2019, 2022, 2024, 2026)

The Great Britain women's national ball hockey team, also known by the nickname Team GB, represents the United Kingdom in international ball hockey competition. The team is organized by Ball Hockey UK (BHUK) – a member of the International Street and Ball Hockey Federation (ISBHF) – and participates in the Ball Hockey World Championship.

== World Championship ==
Great Britain debuted at the 2011 Ball Hockey World Championship and has participated in every subsequent holding. Their best result is fifth place, which they have achieved four times.

| Year | Location | Result |
|---|---|---|
| 2011 | Bratislava, Slovakia | 8th |
| 2013 | St. John's, Canada | 7th |
| 2015 | Zug, Switzerland | 7th |
| 2017 | Pardubice, Czech Republic | 6th |
| 2019 | Košice, Slovakia | 5th |
| 2022 | Laval, Canada | 5th |
| 2024 | Visp and Raron, Switzerland | 5th |
| 2026 | Ostrava, Czech Republic | 5th |

== Team ==
=== Head coaches ===
- 2013: Matt Darlow
- 2015: Carl Wood
- 2017: Carl Wood
- 2019: Luke Browne
- 2022: Ali Cree
- 2024: Ali Cree
- 2026: coaching team

Becky Kasner-Wood (player-coach)
Amanda Murdoch (coach)
Stephanie Towns (player-coach)

=== Captains ===
- 2013: Deana Cuglietta
- 2015: Dana Cuglietta & Rachel Serrell
- 2026: Abbie Culshaw

== Awards and honors ==
=== World Championship ===
==== All Star selections ====
The tournament organizing committee of each Ball Hockey World Championship announces the selection of five players to the All-Star Team – one goalkeeper, two defenders, and three forwards.

- 2017: Rachel Jackson (G)
- 2019: Samantha Bolwell (G)
- 2024: Casey Traill (D)

==== Fair play ====
Team GB received the World Championship fair-play award in 2017 for their sportsmanship. The fair-play award recognized the team with the fewest penalties issued at the World Championship.
