= 2022 Women's Ball Hockey World Championship =

Championnat du Monde Féminin de Dek Hockey 2022

Tournament details
- Host country: Canada
- Venue: 1 (in 1 host city)
- Dates: 21–27 June 2022
- Teams: 6

Final positions
- Champions: Canada (6th title)
- Runners-up: Czech Republic
- Third place: Slovakia

Tournament statistics
- Games played: 20
- Goals scored: 129 (6.45 per game)
- Scoring leader: Carol Ann Upshall (CAN) (19 points)

Awards
- MVP: Carol Ann Upshall (CAN)

The 2022 Women's Ball Hockey World Championship (French: Championnat du monde féminin de dek hockey 2022 or Championnat du monde féminin de hockey-balle 2022) was the eighth women's ball hockey tournament to be held as part of the Ball Hockey World Championship. It was organized by the International Street and Ball Hockey Federation in collaboration with the Canadian Ball Hockey Association and was held at the Place Bell in Laval, Quebec, Canada. The tournament began on 21 June 2022 and medal games were played 27 June 2022.

The Canadian women's national ball hockey team earned their sixth World Championship title after claiming a 3–2 victory over the Czech Republic in the gold medal game.

== Venue ==
Laval
Place Bell
Capacity: 10,062
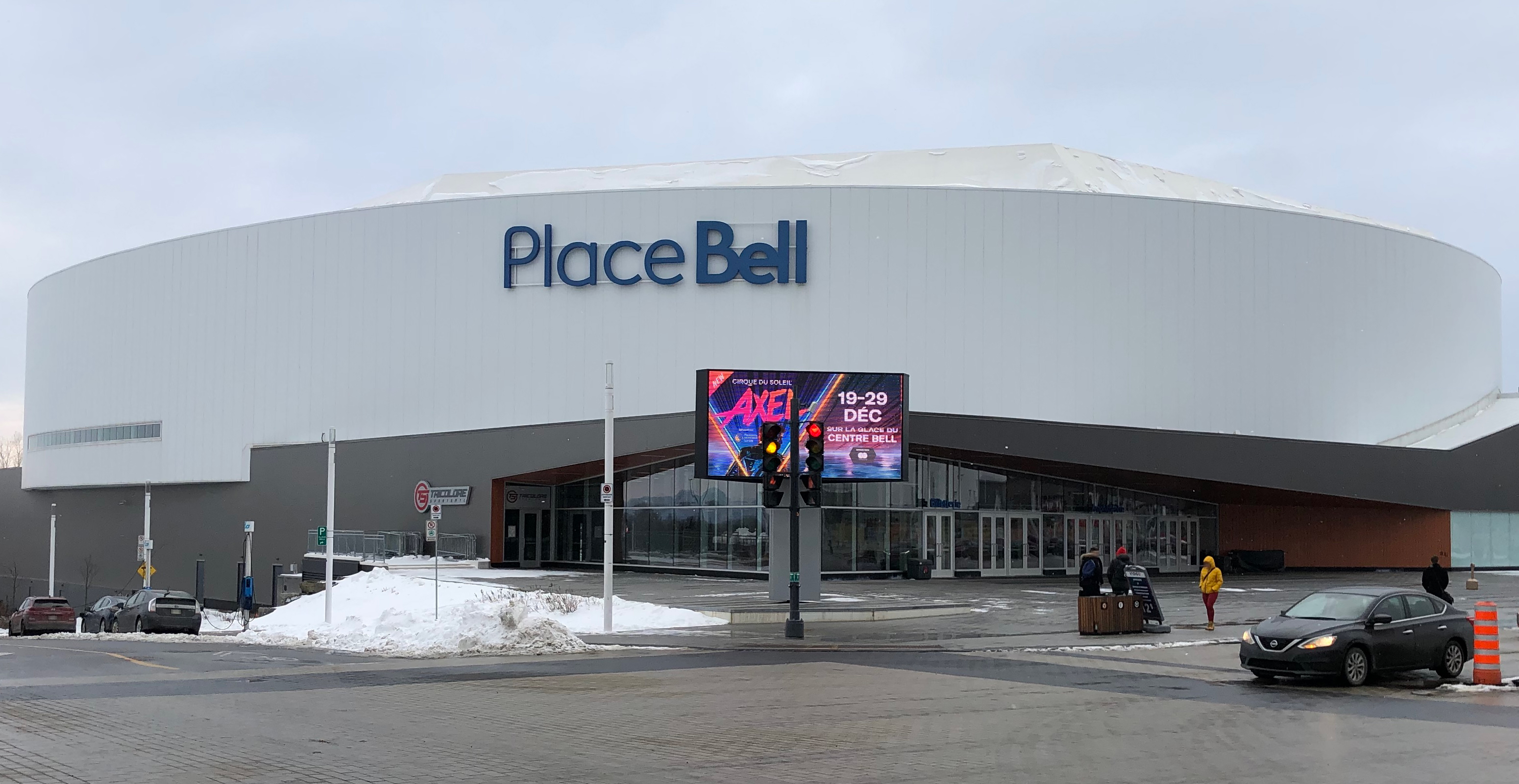

== Participants ==
- Canada
- Czech Republic
- (United Kingdom) Great Britain
- Lebanon
- Slovakia
- United States

Source: ISBHF

== Round-robin ==
=== Standings ===
Pos	Team	Pld	W	OTW	OTL	L	GF	GA	GD	Pts	Qualification
1	Canada (H)	5	4	0	1	0	38	7	+31	13	Finals
2	Czech Republic	5	3	1	0	1	20	6	+14	11	Finals
3	United States	5	3	0	1	1	15	6	+9	10	Finals
4	Slovakia	5	2	1	0	2	20	16	+4	8	Finals
5	(United Kingdom) Great Britain	5	1	0	0	4	8	27	−19	3	Fifth place game
6	Lebanon	5	0	0	0	5	2	41	−39	0	Fifth place game

Updated to match(es) played on 25 June 2022. Source: ISBHF
(H) Host

=== Results ===
21 June 2022; 10:00	Great Britain (United Kingdom)	6 – 1 (1–0, 2–0, 3–1)	Lebanon	Place Bell 1, Laval

Samantha Bolwell
Goalies
Hannah Nakhle Saunders

Towns (Walsh, Leclerc-Cote) – 12:20	1–0
Taylor (Hehir) – 18:47	2–0
K. Carson (V. Carson, Rae) – 22:51	3–0
Culshaw – 35:21	4–0
Sumner (K. Carson, Lahti) – 39:35	5–0
	5–1	41:16 – Yammine
Towns (Walsh) – 44:25	6–1

2 min
Penalties
4 min
39
Shots
7

21 June 2022; 17:00	Canada	2 – 1 (1–0, 0–1, 1–0)	United States	Place Bell 1, Laval

Serena Vilde
Goalies
Brooke Wolejko

McCann (Jue, Clark) – 00:46	1–0
	1–1	19:06 – Fortier (Murphy, Orlando)
Upshall (Brenning, Bannon) – 34:45	2–1

2 min
Penalties
4 min
17
Shots
26

21 June 2022; 21:40	Czech Republic	3 – 1 (1–0, 0–0, 2–1)	Slovakia	Place Bell 2, Laval

Kateřina Zechovská
Goalies
Andrea Pastorková Rišová

Patočková (Manhartová, Kaltounková) – 14:47	1–0
Patočková (Seroiszková, Manhartová) – 36:23	2–0
Herzigová (Kosinová) – 39:36	3–0
	3–1	44:54 – Šulíková (Dzurinová)

6 min
Penalties
8 min
10
Shots
26

22 June 2022; 11:20	Great Britain (United Kingdom)	0 – 12 (0–6, 0–2, 0–4)	Canada	Place Bell 1, Laval

Samantha Bolwell
Goalies
Julianna Thomson

0–1	07:39 – Bannon (Desmier, Upshall)
0–2	08:07 – Clarke (Karpenko, Fischer)
0–3	10:28 – Upshall (A. Blomberg, Jue)
0–4	11:39 – Pallotta (Upshall, Bannon)
0–5	12:10 – Clarke (Fischer, Jue)
0–6	13:34 – Wilson (D. Ring, Cooze)
0–7	17:04 – Cooze (Fischer, Karpenko)
0–8	27:23 – McCann (Cooze, Jue)
0–9	32:47 – Karpenko (Jacobson, Fischer)
0–10	37:14 – Karpenko (R. Ring, Fischer)
0–11	37:35 – Upshall (Bannon, Brenning)
0–12	42:02 – McCann (Pallotta, Desmier)

2 min
Penalties
6 min
5
Shots
21

22 June 2022; 13:40	United States	3 – 4 SO (2–0, 0–3, 1–0) (OT: 0–0) (SO: 0–1)	Slovakia	Place Bell 2, Laval

Sonjia Shelly
Goalies
Natália Dzurillová

Hughson (Levin, Murphy) – 08:06	1–0
Frade (Levin) – 12:24	2–0
	2–1	21:33 – Dobošová (Nemčeková)
	2–2	26:36 – Klimantová (Šimnová, Čorňáková)
	2–3	28:17 – Nemčeková (Dobošová)
Kilroy (Reddinton) – 37:00	3–3

Shootout
Lopušanová
0 min
Penalties
8 min
29
Shots
29

22 June 2022; 16:00	Lebanon	0 – 8 (0–3, 0–2, 0–3)	Czech Republic	Place Bell 2, Laval

Hélena Gebrayel
Goalies
Kristýna Bláhová

0–1	04:47 – Halbrštátová (Pangerlová, Radová)
0–2	08:16 – Křížová (Kubínová, Lédlová)
0–3	10:10 – Kaltounková (Patočková, Manhartová)
0–4	17:58 – Lédlová (Kubínová, Křížová)
0–5	26:34 – Manhartová (Kaltounková, Patočková)
0–6	30:48 – Krásová (Pangerlová, Halbrštátová)
0–7	37:53 – Pangerlová (Krásová)
0–8	42:44 – Kubínová (Křížová)

6 min
Penalties
10 min
30
Shots
4

23 June 2022; 13:40	Canada	3 – 4 SO (0–0, 2–2, 1–1) (OT: 0–0) (SO: 0–1)	Czech Republic	Place Bell 1, Laval

Julianna Thomson
Goalies
Kateřina Zechovská

	0–1	19:57 – Křížová (Kaltounková)
Karpenko (Jue) – 21:49	1–1
Bannon (Upshall) – 23:23	2–1
	2–2	24:25 – Seroiszková (Horálková, Patočková)
	2–3	38:05 – Patočková (Manhartová, Kaltounková)
Cooze (McCann, Upshall) – 44:31	3–3

Shootout
Křížová
4 min
Penalties
2 min
16
Shots
30

23 June 2022; 13:40	United States	6 – 0 (4–0, 2–0, 0–0)	(United Kingdom) Great Britain	Place Bell 2, Laval

Brooke Wolejko
Goalies

Niskanen (Orlando) – 03:15	1–0
Lindey (Niskanen, Clark) – 06:18	2–0
Hughson (Monahan, Stewart) – 07:42	3–0
Fortier (Strohmier, Frade) – 08:19	4–0
Hughson (Stewart, Levin) – 20:00	5–0
Hughson (Stewart, Monahan) – 28:53	6–0

4 min
Penalties
4 min

Shots
10

23 June 2022; 16:00	Slovakia	10 – 1 (5–0, 1–1, 4–0)	Lebanon	Place Bell 2, Laval

Simona Hupková
Andrea Pastorková Rišová
Goalies
Hannah Nakhle Saunders

Nemčeková (Dobošová, Hájniková) – 02:25	1–0
Záborská (Martincová, Dzurinová) – 08:14	2–0
Leskovjanská (Lopušanová, Záborská) – 13:28	3–0
Halušková – 14:04	4–0
Randová (Vršková, Hájniková) – 14:17	5–0
Lopušanová (Šimnová) – 19:08	6–0
	6–1	20:42 – Yammine
Šimnová (Šulíková) – 33:24	7–1
Lopušanová (Cagáňová, Halušková) – 35:17	8–1
Šimnová (Huňadyová, Záňová) – 36:35	9–1
Lopušanová – 42:08	10–1

12 min
Penalties
10 min
50
Shots
14

24 June 2022; 09:00	Slovakia	2 – 8 (0–1, 2–5, 0–2)	Canada	Place Bell 1, Laval

Andrea Pastorková Rišová
Natália Dzurillová
Goalies
Serena Vilde

	0–1	03:06 – Wilson
	0–2	19:25 – Bannon (Jue, Cooze)
	0–3	20:16 – Bannon (Upshall, Desmier)
	0–4	23:11 – McCann (Upshall)
	0–5	26:33 – Upshall (Cerilli, Wilson)
	0–6	28:31 – Clarke (Jue, Fischer)
Halušková (Šulíková) – 28:43	1–6
Leskovjanská (Lopušanová, Šulíková) – 29:00	2–6
	2–7	30:44 – Fischer (Upshall)
	2–8	37:13 – Jue (A. Blomberg, Wilson)

8 min
Penalties
6 min
9
Shots
32

24 June 2022; 11:20	Lebanon	0 – 4 (0–2, 0–2, 0–0)	United States	Place Bell 1, Laval

Hélena Gebrayel
Goalies
Sonjia Shelly

0–1	02:08 – Levin (Fortier, Hughson)
0–2	05:20 – Hughson (Levin, Murphy)
0–3	16:41 – Stewart (Hughson)
0–4	18:51 – Stewart (Pensavalle, Orlando)

12 min
Penalties
12 min
4
Shots
31

24 June 2022; 13:40	Czech Republic	5 – 1 (1–0, 3–1, 1–0)	(United Kingdom) Great Britain	Place Bell 2, Laval

Aneta Jiráčková
Goalies
Samantha Bolwell

Krásová (Pangerlová) – 11:07	1–0
Manhartová – 20:20	2–0
Manhartová (Lédlová, Křížová) – 21:09	3–0
Křížová (Herzigová, Lédlová) – 24:21	4–0
	4–1	29:33 – Towns (K. Carson, Byrom)
Manhartová (Seroiszková, Lédlová) - 35:49	5–1

10 min
Penalties
12 min
60
Shots
5

25 June 2022; 09:20	Slovakia	3 – 1 (1–0, 2–0, 0–1)	(United Kingdom) Great Britain	Place Bell 1, Laval

Natália Dzurillová
Goalies
Samantha Bolwell

Šimnová (Nemčeková) – 06:14	1–0
Lopušanová (Šulíková, Cagáňová) – 22:32	2–0
Dobošová – 23:06	3–0
	3–1	40:42 – Kasner-Wood (Towns, Culshaw)

6 min
Penalties
6 min
27
Shots
11

25 June 2022; 11:40	United States	1 – 0 (0–0, 1–0, 0–0)	Czech Republic	Place Bell 1, Laval

Brooke Wolejko	Goalies	Kristýna Bláhová
Monahan (Lindey) – 25:34 / 1–0
18 min	Penalties	16 min
10	Shots	22

25 June 2022; 16:30	Canada	13 – 0 (6–0, 2–0, 5–0)	Lebanon	Place Bell 2, Laval

Serena Vilde
Goalies
Hélena Gebrayel

Wilson (Clarke) – 02:02	1–0
Upshall (Karpenko, McCann) – 03:30	2–0
Cerilli (D. Ring, C. Blomberg) – 08:53	3–0
Wilson (Cerilli) – 12:02	4–0
D. Ring (Desmier, Cooze) – 13:15	5–0
D. Ring (Desmier, Cooze) – 13:15	6–0
Upshall (Jue) – 17:34	7–0
C. Blomberg (Cerilli) – 24:40	8–0
McCann (Jue) – 33:07	9–0
Upshall (Karpenko) – 34:51	10–0
Upshall (Bannon) – 38:24	11–0
Upshall (Bannon) – 38:48	12–0
Desmier (D. Ring) – 42:10	13–0

4 min
Penalties
2 min
55
Shots
6

== Fifth place game ==
All times in Eastern Daylight Time (UTC−04:00)

26 June 2022; 10:45	Great Britain (United Kingdom)	6 – 2 (1–1, 2–0, 3–1)	Lebanon	Place Bell 1, Laval

8 min	Penalties	8 min
15	Shots	21

== Finals ==
=== Bracket ===
Semifinals
26 June
1 Canada	3
4 Slovakia	2
2 Czech Republic	6
3 United States	0

Final
27 June
Canada	3
Czech Republic	2
Third place
Slovakia	2
4 United States	0

=== Results ===
All times in Eastern Daylight Time (UTC−04:00)

==== Semifinals ====
26 June 2022; 13:00	Czech Republic	6 – 0 (2–0, 1–0, 3–0)	United States	Place Bell 1, Laval

Kateřina Zechovská
Goalies
Brooke Wolejko

Manhartová (Seroiszková, Horálková) – 13:33	1–0
Kaltounková (Krásová, Manhartová) – 13:58	2–0
Kaltounková (Horálková, Seroiszková) – 21:50	3–0
Kubínová (Škorpíková, Lédlová) – 31:25	4–0
Lédlová (Radová) – 36:42	5–0
Horálková (Šmajdová, Kosinová) – 43:15	6–0

10 min
Penalties
12 min
21
Shots
15

26 June 2022; 15:30	Canada	3 – 2 (0–1, 2–0, 1–1)	Slovakia	Place Bell 1, Laval

Julianna Thomson
Goalies
Andrea Pastorková Rišová

	0–1	12:36 – Čorňáková (Dobošová, Nemčeková)
Cerilli (Cooze, Desmier) – 19:00	1–1
Bannon (Upshall) – 21:39	2–1
Karpenko (R. Ring, Cooze) – 30:39	3–1
	3–2	44:07 – Lopušanová (Leskovjanská)

10 min
Penalties
6 min
26
Shots
19

==== Bronze medal game ====
27 June 2022; 10:15	United States	0 – 2 (0–2, 0–0, 0–0)	Slovakia	Place Bell 1, Laval

Brooke Wolejko	Goalies	Andrea Pastorková Rišová
0–1 / 01:34 – Lopušanová (Leskovjanská, Šulíková); 0–2 / 12:39 – Dobošová (Nemčeková, Lopušanová)
24 min	Penalties	10 min
41	Shots	23

==== Gold medal game ====
27 June 2022; 17:45	Canada	3 – 2 (0–2, 2–0, 1–0)	Czech Republic	Place Bell 1, Laval

Julianna Thomson
Goalies
Kateřina Zechovská

	0–1	03:38 – Kosinová (Manhartová, Lédlová)
	0–2	04:33 – Krásová (Horálková, Manhartová)
Fischer Upshall) – 22:25	1–2
Clarke (Jue, Jacobson) – 24:48	2–2
Cooze (McCann, Upshall) – 40:06	3–2

8 min
Penalties
12 min
30
Shots
24

== Awards ==
Individual awards

Award	Player
Best Goaltender	Andrea Pastorková Rišová (SVK)
Best Defenceman	Melanie Jue (CAN)
Best Forward	Lucie Manhartová (CZE)
MVP	Carol Ann Upshall (CAN)

All-Star team

Position	Player
Goaltender	Juliana Thomson (CAN)
Defenceman	Pavlína Horálková (CZE)
Defenceman	Kristen Cooze (CAN)
Forward	Sarah Hughson (USA)
Forward	Nela Lopušanová (SVK)
Forward	Denisa Křížová (CZE)

== Final ranking ==
Pos	Team	Pld	W	OTW	OTL	L	GF	GA	GD	Pts	Final result
1	Canada (H)	7	6	0	1	0	44	11	+33	19	Gold medal
2	Czech Republic	7	4	1	0	2	28	9	+19	14	Silver medal
3	Slovakia	7	3	1	0	3	24	19	+5	11	Bronze medal
4	United States	7	3	0	1	3	15	14	+1	10	Fourth place
5	(United Kingdom) Great Britain	6	2	0	0	4	14	29	−15	6	Fifth place
6	Lebanon	6	0	0	0	6	4	47	−43	0	Sixth place

Updated to match(es) played on 27 June 2022. Source: ISBHF
(H) Host

== Rosters ==
Rank	Team	Players
1st place, gold medalist(s)	Canada	Goalkeepers: Nathalie Girouard, Julianna Thomson, Serena Vilde; Defencemen: Alicia Blomberg, Carley Blomberg, Kristen Cooze, Corie Jacobson, Melanie Jue, Rebecca Ring; Forwards: Geneviève Bannon, Edie Brenning, Angie Cerilli, Shae-Lynn Clarke, Elysia Desmier, Reagan Fischer, Chelsea Karpenko, Jessica McCann, Giuliana Pallotta, Danielle Ring, Margaux Sharp, Dawn Tulk, Carol Ann Upshall, Emma Wilson
2nd place, silver medalist(s)	Czech Republic	Goalkeepers: Kristýna Bláhová, Aneta Jiráčková, Kateřina Zechovská; Defencemen: Petra Herzigová, Karolína Kosinová, Zuzana Martinů, Tereza Radová, Lucie Rejlová, Klára Seroiszková; Forwards: Vanesa Halbrštátová, Pavlína Horálková, Tereza Ištoková, Kristýna Kaltounková, Tereza Kotlíková, Michaela Krásová, Denisa Křížová, Lucie Kubínová, Aneta Lédlová, Lucie Manhartová, Natálie Pangerlová, Barbora Patočková, Vivien Šmajdová, Patricie Škorpíková
3rd place, bronze medalist(s)	Slovakia	Goalkeepers: Natália Dzurillová, Simona Hupková, Andrea Pastorková Rišová; Defencemen: Paula Cagáňová, Patrícia Mária Dzurinová, Alexandra Gáborčíková, Lucia Martincová, Nina Štrbáková, Alžběta Šulíková, Lucia Záborská; Forwards: Alexandra Čorňáková, Tamara Dobošová, Romana Halušková, Michaela Hájniková, Petra Huňadyová, Andrea Klimantová, Emília Leskovjanská, Nela Lopušanová, Nikola Nemčeková, Natália Paľová, Nikoleta Randová, Kristína Šimnová, Michaela Vršková, Ema Záňová
4	United States	Goalkeepers: Sonjia Shelly, Brooke Wolejko; Defencemen: Victoria Biagetti, Melissa Clark, Marissa Massaro, Chelsea Monahan, Heidi Niskanen, Elena Orlando; Forwards: Sophia Agostinelli, Megan Fortier, Haley Frade, Amanda Gavulic, Casie Hanson, Sarah Hughson, Lisa Kilroy, Karen Levin, Hannah Lindey, Lindsey Machak, Colleen Murphy, Courtney Pensavalle, Sara Reddinton, Cherie Stewart, Danielle Strohmier
5	(United Kingdom) Great Britain	Goalkeeper: Samantha Bolwell; Defencemen: Hannah Byrom, Laura Dance, Lucy Gruber, Jenny Hehir, Emma Painter, Jessica Rae, Aisling Rafter; Forwards: Kayla Carson, Victoria Carson, Abbie Culshaw, Alice Jones, Becky Kasner-Wood, Saara Lahti, Joannie Leclerc-Cote, Charlotte McPhee, Kate Parker, Savannah Sumner, Hazel Taylor, Stephanie Towns, Lydia Walsh
6	Lebanon	Goalkeepers: Hélena Gebrayel, Hannah Nakhle Saunders; Defencemen: Sabrina Allahwardeyan, Jordan Beshara, Ranim Boulos, Stéphanie Chouchani, Sarah Haddad, Jenna Hendrickx; Forwards: Marion Chanel, Zahra Dahnoun, Lily Davis, Mélanie Ghantous, Dahlia Haddad, Maria Hajj, Jessica Machtoub Kfoury, Robyn Peck, Paula Santanna, Madeline Wopling, Britni Yammine
