= Pavlína Horálková =

Czech ice hockey player (born 1991)

- Born: 24 May 1991 (age 35) Benešov, Czechoslovakia
- Height: 1.66 m (5 ft 5 in)
- Weight: 61 kg (134 lb; 9 st 8 lb)
- Position: Defense
- Shot: Right
- Played for: HC Slavia Praha; Biryusa Krasnoyarsk; Dynamo-Neva St. Petersburg
- National team: Czech Republic
- Playing career: 2007–2026
Medal record
Women's ice hockey
IIHF World Championship
Bronze medal – third place	2022 Denmark
Women's ball hockey
ISBHF World Championship
Gold medal – first place	2017 Czech Republic
Silver medal – second place	2022 Canada
Bronze medal – third place	2009 Czech Republic
Bronze medal – third place	2011 Slovakia
Bronze medal – third place	2015 Switzerland
Bronze medal – third place	2019 Slovakia

Pavlína Horálková (born 24 May 1991) is a Czech retired professional ice hockey player and elite ball hockey player. She represented the Czech Republic with the national ice hockey team and the national ball hockey team, winning world championship medals in both sports.

== Ice hockey career ==
Horálková's elite career began with HC Slavia Praha in the Elite Women's Hockey League (EWHL) and the 1. liga ženského hokeje, the Czech national championship league for women's ice hockey. She played with HC Slavia Praha from 2007 until 2014, twice winning the EWHL championship, in2008 and 2009, and winning the Czech championship in 2012.

Ahead of the 2014–15 season, Horálková signed with Biryusa Krasnoyarsk in the Russian Women's Hockey League (RWHL). She signed alongside two other Czech players, goaltender Klára Peslarová and forward Lucie Manhartová, and the trio were the only internationals on the otherwise Russian team.

The RWHL was reconfigured into the Zhenskaya Hockey League (ZhHL) ahead of the 2015–16 season. Horálková opted to return to Biryusa for that season and she would go on to play a total of ten seasons with the team – one in the RWHL and nine in the ZhHL. She was selected to play in the ZhHL All-Star Games in 2019, 2020, and 2022, and served as Biryusa's captain during the 2023–24 regular season.

In 2024, Horálková signed with Dynamo-Neva Saint Petersburg and played with the club through the 2025–26 ZhHL season. She won ZhHL championship silver with Dynamo-Neva in 2025.

Horálková announced her retirement from elite ice hockey competition in June 2026.

=== International play ===
Horálková represented the Czech Republic in the women's ice hockey tournament at the 2022 Winter Olympics in Beijing and at the IIHF Women's World Championship in 2016, 2017, 2019, 2021, and 2022. She was part of the history-making Czech roster that won the country's first medal at the Women's World Championship, claiming bronze in 2022.

== Ball hockey career ==
Horálková is also an elite ball hockey player and has represented the Czech Republic at the Ball Hockey World Championship for more than a decade, winning a gold medal in 2017, silver in 2022, and bronze medals in 2009, 2011, 2015, and 2019.
