= United States women's national ball hockey team =

United States
- Association: USA Ball Hockey
- General manager: Angelo Terrana
- Head coach: Jennifer Wilson
- Assistants: Jake Denne; Matt Fair
- Captain: Colleen Murphy

Biggest win
- United States 10 - 2 Switzerland (Plzeň, Czech Republic · 2009)

Biggest defeat
- Canada 9 - 0 United States (Plzeň, Czech Republic · June 19, 2009)

World Championship
- Appearances: 10 (first in 2007)
- Best result: Gold (2024, 2026)

Medal record

World Championship
Gold medal – first place	2024 Visp - Raron	
Gold medal – first place	2026 Ostrava	
Silver medal – second place	2017 Pardubice	
Silver medal – second place	2019 Košice	

The United States women's national ball hockey team represents the United States in international ball hockey competition. The team is organized by USA Ball Hockey – a member of the International Street and Ball Hockey Federation (ISBHF) – and participates in the Ball Hockey World Championship.

== History ==
The United States has participated in every World Championship since the introduction of the women's tournament in 2007. The team placed fourth in each of the first five tournaments.

The United States earned their first-ever podium finish tt the 2017 World Championship. The team defeated Canada, the defending champions, in the semifinals by a score of 3–2. Rebecca Dobson scored the game-winning goal with 34 seconds remaining in regulation time. Advancing to the gold medal game against host country Czech Republic, the US forced overtime, although the result was a 4–3 loss.

Of note, the 2017 United States roster also featured three players from the National Women's Hockey League (NWHL): Paige Harrington, who captured the 2017 Isobel Cup championship as a member of the Buffalo Beauts, and New York Riveters alumni Cherie Stewart and Amber Moore.

== World Championship ==
Year	Location	Result	Position	GP	W	OTW	OTL	L	GF	GA
(Germany) 2007	Ratingen	Semifinals	4th place	—N/a						
(Czech Republic) 2009	Plzeň	Semifinals	4th place	—N/a						
(Slovakia) 2011	Bratislava	Semifinals	4th place	—N/a						
(Canada) 2013	St. John's, Newfoundland	Semifinals	4th place	—N/a						
(Switzerland) 2015	Zug	Semifinals	4th place	—N/a						
(Czech Republic) 2017	Pardubice	Runners-up	2nd place, silver medalist(s)	7	4	0	0	3	18	13
(Slovakia) 2019	Košice	Runners-up	2nd place, silver medalist(s)	7	2	1	1	3	13	17
(Canada) 2022	Laval, Quebec	Semifinals	4th place	7	3	0	1	3	15	14
(Switzerland) 2024	Visp and Raron	Champions	1st place, gold medalist(s)	8	5	2	0	1	31	8
(Czech Republic) 2026	Ostrava	Champions	1st place, gold medalist(s)	7	5	1	1	0	29	6

== Team ==
=== Head coaches ===
- 2019: Gwen Ranquist-Lemiueux
- 2022: Scott Hicks
- 2024: Jennifer Wilson
- 2026: Jennifer Wilson

=== Captains ===
- 2017: Tiffany Pfundt
- 2024: Colleen Murphy
- 2026: Colleen Murphy

== Awards and honors ==
ISBHF Female Player of the Year

- 2024: Brooke Wolejko

Female Coach of the Year

- 2024: Jennifer Wilson

=== World Championship ===
The tournament organizing committee of each Ball Hockey World Championship names the top players at each position, the most valuable player (MVP) of the tournament, and the World Championship's top scorer.

Award	Winner	Year
Best Defender	Lisa Bac	2007
Best Defender	Stefanie Caban	2019
Best Forward	Becky Dobson	2019
Best Goalkeeper	Brooke Wolejko	2024
Best Goalkeeper	Maxie Weisz	2026
MVP	Emma Seitz	2024
MVP	Emma Seitz	2026

==== All Star selections ====
The tournament organizing committee of each Ball Hockey World Championship also announces five players selected to the All-Star Team – one goalkeeper, two defenders, and three forwards.

- 2013: Megan Habina (D)
- 2017: Stephanie Caban (D), Taylor Steadman (F)
- 2019: Cherie Stewart (F)
- 2022: Sarah Hughson (F)
- 2024: Katherine Murphy (F)
- 2026: Arianna Kosakowski (D)

=== ISBHF Hall of Fame ===
Inductee	Induction class	Category
Alessandra Glista (née Ciambra)	2022	Player
