= Rose Alleva =

American ice hockey and ball hockey player (born 1992)

Personal information
- Born: June 16, 1992 (age 34)
- Home town: Red Wing, Minnesota, US
- Height: 5 ft (1.5 m)
- Weight: 126 lb (57 kg)
Ice hockey career
- Position: Defense
- Shot: Right
- Played for: Metropolitan Riveters; Minnesota Whitecaps; Shenzhen KRS Vanke Rays; Princeton Tigers
- Playing career: 2010–2022

Sport
- Country: United States
- Sport: Ball hockey
- Position: Defender
Medal record
Women's ball hockey
World Championship
Gold medal – first place	2026 Czech Republic

Rose Alleva (born June 16, 1992) is an American ball hockey player and retired professional ice hockey player. She most recently played professional ice hockey for the Metropolitan Riveters of the Premier Hockey Federation (PHF) in the 2021–22 season.

== Career ==
Alleva was invited to the USA Hockey National Development Camp in 2007, the first player from her hometown of Red Wing, Minnesota to be invited since John Pohl was invited two decades earlier. In 2010, she was named a finalist for the Minnesota Ms. Hockey Award.

From 2010 to 2014, she attended Princeton University, scoring 39 points in 115 NCAA games. She picked up an assist in her collegiate debut on October 22, 2010, against Northeastern University. She led the team's defenders in scoring in her senior year, being named a Second-Team All-Ivy and winning her team's Unsung Hero Award.

After graduating, she spent time with the independent Minnesota Whitecaps, including joining them for an exhibition tour of Sweden in the summer of 2017.

She was selected 70th overall by the Canadian Women's Hockey League's Vanke Rays in the 2017 CWHL Draft, and would sign with the team for the 2017–18 season. She picked up four points in twenty-eight games in her rookie CWHL season. She scored her first CWHL goal on March 10, 2018, against Kunlun Red Star, the last game-winning regular season goal in Vanke Rays history as a separate team. The next season, the team would merge with Kunlun to make the Shenzhen KRS Vanke Rays, and she chose to stay with the team. She notched one assist in thirteen games in the 2018–19 CWHL season.

After the collapse of the CWHL in May 2019, she chose not to stay with Shenzhen as they moved to the Russian Zhenskaya Hockey League, but instead returned to Minnesota to sign with the Whitecaps, who were part of the NWHL. She re-signed with the team for the 2020–21 NWHL season, with Whitecaps general manager Jack Brodt stating that "Rose’s good hands and quick moves are a great asset in breaking out the puck."

== Personal life ==
Alleva has a master's degree in biological science from the University of Minnesota and a bachelor's degree in ecology and evolutionary biology from Princeton. She previously attended Red Wing High School, where she was an all-conference tennis player alongside her hockey career. In 2020, she returned to the school to serve as their Girls Tennis Coach.

Born in China but raised in Minnesota, she turned down the chance to obtain Chinese citizenship while playing for Shenzhen, as it would've required her to give up her American citizenship.

== Career statistics ==
			Regular Season					Playoffs
Season	Team	League	GP	G	A	Pts	PIM	GP	G	A	Pts	PIM
2010–11	Princeton	ECAC	31	0	4	4	25	–	–	–	–	–
2011–12	Princeton	ECAC	26	2	6	8	12	–	–	–	–	–
2012–13	Princeton	ECAC	29	1	10	11	10	–	–	–	–	–
2013–14	Princeton	ECAC	29	6	10	16	6	–	–	–	–	–
2017–18	Vanke Rays	CWHL	28	1	3	4	18	–	–	–	–	–
2018–19	Shenzhen KRS Vanke Rays	CWHL	13	0	1	1	0	–	–	–	–	–
2019–20	Minnesota Whitecaps	NWHL	17	0	0	0	2	0	0	0	0	0
2020–21	Minnesota Whitecaps	NWHL	4	0	1	1	0	1	0	0	0	0
2021–22	Metropolitan Riveters	PHF	20	0	5	5	2	1	0	1	1	0
NCAA totals			115	9	30	39	53	–	–	–	–	–
CWHL totals			41	1	4	5	18	–	–	–	–	–
NWHL/PHF totals			41	0	6	6	4	2	0	1	1	0
