= Czech Republic women's national ball hockey team =

Czech Republic
- Association: Czech Ball Hockey Association
- Head coach: Michal Broulík
- Assistants: Václav Tůma; Jakub Hnátek
- Captain: Lucie Manhartová

Biggest win
- Czech Republic 17 – 0 Great Britain (United Kingdom) (Ostrava, Czech Republic · 25 June 2026)

World Championship
- Appearances: 10 (first in 2007)
- Best result: (gold) Gold (2017)

The Czech Republic women's national ball hockey team (Czech: Česká hokejbalová reprezentace žen) represents the Czech Republic in international ball hockey competition. The team is organized by the Czech Ball Hockey Association (CBHA; Českomoravský svaz hokejbalu—ČMSHb) – a member of the International Street and Ball Hockey Federation (ISBHF) – and participates in the Ball Hockey World Championship.

== History ==
The Czech Republic hosted the second Women's Ball Hockey World Championship in 2009. Matches were played in the city of Plzeň and the national team secured its second bronze medal finish.

They reached the final of the 2022 tournament, winning a silver medal after losing to host country Canada in the final.

=== World Championship ===
Year	Location	Result	Position
2007	Ratingen, Germany	Third Place	3rd place, bronze medalist(s)
2009	Plzeň, Czech Republic	Third Place	3rd place, bronze medalist(s)
2011	Bratislava, Slovakia	Third Place	3rd place, bronze medalist(s)
2013	St. John's, Canada	Third Place	3rd place, bronze medalist(s)
2015	Zug, Switzerland	Runners-up	2nd place, silver medalist(s)
2017	Pardubice, Czech Republic	Champions	1st place, gold medalist(s)
2019	Košice, Slovakia	Third Place	3rd place, bronze medalist(s)
2022	Laval, Canada	Runners-up	2nd place, silver medalist(s)
2024	Visp and Raron, Switzerland	Runners-up	2nd place, silver medalist(s)
2026	Ostrava, Czech Republic	Runners-up	2nd place, silver medalist(s)

== Team ==
=== Head coaches ===
- 2015: Karel Manhart
- 2019: Karel Manhart
- 2022: Karel Manhart
- 2026: Michal Broulík

=== Captains ===
- 2017: Michaela Rullová
- 2026: Lucie Manhartová

== Awards and honors ==
=== World Championship ===
Five individual awards are selected by the tournament organizing committee of each Ball Hockey World Championship: the top player at each position, the most valuable player (MVP) of the tournament, and the World Championship's top scorer. The following table lists all individual award winners representing the Czech Republic.

Award	Winner	Year
Best Defender	Petra Herzigová	2024
Best Defender	Klára Seroiszková	2026
Best Forward	Denisa Křížová	2017
Best Forward	Lucie Manhartová	2022
Best Forward	Kristýna Kaltounková	2024
Best Forward	Lucie Kubínová	2026
Best Goalkeeper	Kateřina Bečevová	2009
Best Goalkeeper	Kateřina Bečevová	2013
MVP	Kateřina Zechovská	2017
Top scorer	Denisa Křížová	2019

==== All Star selections ====
The tournament organizing committee of each Ball Hockey World Championship also announces five players selected to the All-Star Team – one goalkeeper, two defenders, and three forwards.

- 2009: Laura Pešková (F)
- 2013: Lucie Povová (F)
- 2019: Denisa Křížová (D), Lucie Manhartová (F)
- 2022: Pavlína Horálková (D)
- 2026: Kateřina Dvořáková (G), Petra Herzigová (D)

=== ISBHF Hall of Fame ===
As of 2026, one Czech woman has been inducted into the ISBHF Hall of Fame.

Inductee	Class	Category
Michaela Rullová	2026	Player
