= Canada women's national ball hockey team =

Canadian sports team

Canada
- Association: Canada Ball Hockey Association
- General manager: Stéphanie Brunette-D'Souza
- Head coach: Mandi Duhamel
- Assistants: Reagan Fischer; Misty Seastrom
- Captain: Amanda Kean
- Team colours: Black, red, white

Biggest win
- Canada 15 – 0 Greece (Plzeň, Czech Republic · 2009)

Biggest defeat
- Slovakia 1 – 0 Canada (Bratislava, Slovakia · June 23, 2011)

World Championship
- Appearances: 10 (first in 2007)
- Best result: (gold) Gold (2007, 2009, 2013, 2015, 2019, 2022)

The Canada women's national ball hockey represents Canada in international ball hockey competition. The team is organized by the Canada Ball Hockey Association (CBHA) – a member of the International Street and Ball Hockey Federation (ISBHF) – and participates in the Ball Hockey World Championship..

== World Championship ==
Year	Location	Result	Position
2007	Ratingen, Germany	Champions	1st place, gold medalist(s)
2009	Plzeň, Czech Republic	Champions	1st place, gold medalist(s)
2011	Bratislava, Slovakia	Runners-up	2nd place, silver medalist(s)
2013	St. John's, Canada	Champions	1st place, gold medalist(s)
2015	Zug, Switzerland	Champions	1st place, gold medalist(s)
2017	Pardubice, Czech Republic	Third Place	3rd place, bronze medalist(s)
2019	Košice, Slovakia	Champions	1st place, gold medalist(s)
2022	Laval, Canada	Champions	1st place, gold medalist(s)
2024	Visp and Raron, Switzerland	Third Place	3rd place, bronze medalist(s)
2026	Ostrava, Czech Republic	Third Place	3rd place, bronze medalist(s)

== Team ==
=== Head coaches ===
- 2019: Steve Power
- 2022: Mandi Duhamel
- 2024: Maryelle Hannam
- 2026: Mandi Duhamel

=== Captains ===
- 2019: Michelle Marsz
- 2026: Amanda Kean

== Awards and honours ==
=== World Championship ===
Five individual awards are selected by the tournament organizing committee of each Ball Hockey World Championship: the top player at each position, the most valuable player (MVP) of the tournament, and the World Championship's top scorer. The following table lists all individual award winners representing Canada.

Award	Winner	Year
Best Defender	Kristen Cooze	2017
Best Defender	Melanie Jue	2022
Best Forward	Melissa Talaro	2009
Best Forward	Alicia Blomberg	2013
Best Forward	Alicia Blomberg	2015
Best Goalkeeper	Delayne Brian	2015
Best Goalkeeper	Natalie Girouard	2019
MVP	Caroline Bérubé	2009
MVP	Fannie Desforges	2013
MVP	Kristen Cooze	2015
MVP	Michelle Marsz	2019
MVP	Carol Ann Upshall	2022
Top Scorer	Caroline Bérubé	2009
Top Scorer	Fannie Desforges	2013
Top Scorer	Amanda Kean	2015
Top Scorer	Jamie Lee Rattray	2017
Top Scorer	Carol Ann Upshall	2022
Top Scorer	Carol Ann Upshall	2024
Top Scorer	Carol Ann Upshall	2026

==== All Star selections ====
The tournament organizing committee of each Ball Hockey World Championship also announces five players selected to the All-Star Team – one goalkeeper, two defenders, and three forwards.

- 2009: Caroline Bérubé (F), Michelle Binning (F)
- 2013: Dawn Tulk (F)
- 2019: Jessie McCann (F)
- 2022: Kristen Cooze (D), Julianna Thomson (G)
- 2024: Neleh Vigneau Sargeant (F)
- 2026: Kaitlyn McKnight (F)

==== Fair play ====
Team Canada received the World Championship Fair Play Cup in 2013 and 2015 for their fair sportsmanship. The Fair Play Cup recognized the team with the fewest penalties at the World Championship.

=== ISBHF Hall of Fame ===
As of 2026, three of the five women to have been inducted into the ISBHF Hall of Fame were Canadian.

Inductee	Class	Category
Kristen Cooze	2022	Player
Christine Pellerin	2022	Builder
Nathalie Girourd	2024	Player
