= Alicia Blomberg =

Canadian ice hockey and ball hockey player

Personal information
- Born: April 27, 1989 (age 37) Timmins, Ontario, Canada
- Height: 5 ft (1.5 m)
Ice hockey career
- Position: Forward
- Shot: Right
- Played for: Ottawa Gee Gees
- Playing career: 2008–2015

Sport
- Country: Canada
- Sport: Ball hockey
- Position: Forward
- Shoots: Right
- Sports career
- Sport: Ice cross downhill
- Competition: Crashed Ice
- Years active: 2012–2015
Medal record
Women's ball hockey
ISBHF World Championship
Gold medal – first place	2013 Canada
Gold medal – first place	2015 Switzerland
Gold medal – first place	2022 Canada
Bronze medal – third place	2017 Czech Republic
Bronze medal – third place	2026 Czech Republic
Women's ice cross downhill
Crashed Ice
Bronze medal – third place	2014 Quebec City

Alicia Furletti-Blomberg (born 1989) is a Canadian ball hockey player and retired ice hockey player and ice cross downhill racer. As a member of the Canadian national ball hockey team, she is a three-time Ball Hockey World Championship gold medallist.

Blomberg participated in ice cross downhill competitions as part of Crashed Ice during 2012 to 2015. She won a Crashed Ice bronze medal in 2014.

== Playing career ==
=== Ice hockey ===
Blomberg's college ice hockey career was played with the Ottawa Gee Gees women's ice hockey program of Canadian Interuniversity Sport (CIS).

Her final appearance with the Gee-Gees took place on March 31, 2013 as the Gee-Gees took on the Czech Republic women's national ice hockey team in an exhibition game in Rockland, Ontario, prior to the Czechs participating in the 2013 IIHF Women's World Championship in nearby Ottawa. The final score was a 6-3 loss to the visiting Czechs.

=== Ball hockey ===
As a member of the Canadian national ball hockey team, Blomberg has captured three world championship gold medals – in 2013, 2015, and 2022. Her first appearance for Canada was at the 2013 ISBHF World Championships in St. John's, Newfoundland and Labrador, Canada.

Returning to the Canadian team in 2015, she contributed towards Canada going undefeated in the tournament, claiming the gold medal for the second consecutive time. In the gold medal game against the Czech Republic, Blomberg logged a goal and a pair of assists in the 5-1 final. For her efforts, she was recognized as Canada's Player of the Game. Blomberg tied fellow Canadian Jessie McCann for eighth in tournament scoring, logging five goals and three assists in seven games played.

=== Ice cross downhill ===
Having competed in the Red Bull Crashed Ice competitions from 2012 to 2015, Blomberg achieved a podium finish in 2014, capturing the bronze medal in the world championships. Salla Kyhala of Finland captured the gold medal while fellow Canadian Jacqueline Legere won the silver medal.

== Awards and honours ==
- Best Forward, 2013 ISBHF Worlds
- 2013 Ottawa Sports Awards, Individual Sport Award Winner: Ball Hockey
- 2013 University of Ottawa Sports Services President's Award (recognizing outstanding athletic, academic, and community achievement)
- 2015 CBHA Nationals, All-Star Team Selection
- Best Forward, 2015 ISBHF Worlds
- All-Tournament Team Selection, 2017 Ball Hockey World Championship
