= Italy men's national ball hockey team =

- Nickname: Gli Azzurri
- Sport: Ball hockey
- Founded: 2003
- Association: Italian National Ball Hockey Federation (INBHF)
- President: Anthony Contento
- Head coach: Chris Malkhassian
- General manager: John Ventullo
- Members: ISBHF
- World Championship appearances: 10 (2003, 2005, 2007, 2009, 2013, 2015, 2017, 2019, 2022, 2024)
- Best result: Bronze (2005)
- Records: Largest win: Italy 11–1 Great Britain (Plzeň; 2009) • Largest loss: Czech Republic 12–0 Italy (Pardubice; 2017)
- Website: www.inbhf.com

The Italy men's national ball hockey team Nazionale italiana di ball hockey, nicknamed the Gli Azzurri, represents Italy in international ball hockey competition. The team is organized by the Italian National Ball Hockey Federation (INBHF) and competes as a full member of the International Street and Ball Hockey Federation (ISBHF).

Italy made its debut at the 2003 Ball Hockey World Championship and has since participated in ten editions of the tournament. The team achieved its best finish in 2005, capturing the bronze medal in Pittsburgh, United States. Known for their competitive style and consistent presence on the international stage, the Azzurri have become one of the established European sides in the sport of ball hockey.

== History ==
The Italy men's national ball hockey team made its international debut at the 2003 Ball Hockey World Championship in Sierre, Switzerland, finishing in fourth place. Two years later, the team captured its first and only medal to date, earning the bronze at the 2005 Ball Hockey World Championship in Pittsburgh, United States.

Throughout the late 2000s and early 2010s, Italy remained a consistent presence at the ISBHF World Championships, highlighted by a 7th-place finish in 2009 (Plzeň, Czech Republic) and a 12th-place finish in 2013 (St. John's, Canada).

In more recent years, Italy has maintained a steady performance among the top ten nations. At the 2017 in Pardubice, Czech Republic, the team placed 10th, followed by a strong 5th place showing at the 2019 in Košice, Slovakia. Italy remained competitive with a 6th-place result in the 2022 in Laval, Canada, and most recently finished 8th at the 2024 tournament in Visp and Raron, Switzerland.

== World Championships ==
Italy made its world championship debut in 2003, were finished fourth place. In 2005 world championship the Italy won the bronze medal, defeating Portugal 6–1 in the bronze medal final game.

== Tournament results ==
Below is a summary of Italy's results in the ISBHF World Ball Hockey Championships:

Year	Location	Final position
2003	Switzerland, Sierre	4th place
2005	United States, Pittsburgh	Bronze (3rd)
2007	Germany, Ratingen	4th place
2009	Czech Republic, Plzeň	7th place
2013	Canada, St. John's	12th place
2015	Switzerland, Zug	10th place
2017	Czech Republic, Pardubice	10th place
2019	Slovakia, Košice	5th place
2022	Canada, Laval	6th place
2024	Switzerland, Visp / Raron	8th place

=== ISBHF World Ball Hockey Championships Rosters, Statistics & Results ===
2019 - Slovakia, Košice

Roster

The following players were named to the Italy men's national ball hockey team for the 2019 ISBHF World Championships.

#	Position	Name	Birth date	Age at tournament	Stick
96	F	Adam Bevilacqua	January 15, 1988	31	R
66	F	Daniel Ponce	May 29, 1990	29	R
61	D	Massimo Principe	March 11, 1975	44	L
99	F	Daniel Setacci	November 21, 1990	28	L
32	F	Daniel Vernace	July 11, 1991	27	R
29	G	Anthony Flores	August 26, 1985	33	—
30	G	Markus Rocci	March 7, 2002	17	L
14	D	Stefano Alonzi	June 18, 1995	23	L
44	D	Peter Angiolella	September 5, 1991	27	L
49	D	Michael Antonali	February 13, 1989	30	R
21	D	Matthew De Persiis	March 5, 1994	25	L
16	D	Marc Falzoi	February 3, 1988	31	L
5	D	Adriano Fiacconi	June 16, 1979	39	L
6	D	Stefan Pittiglio	August 5, 1998	20	L
90	F	Massimo D’Ettore	April 3, 1996	23	L
39	F	Samuel Gagnon	October 13, 1995	23	L
89	F	Frank Giustini	October 6, 1988	30	R
92	F	Christopher Chirola	April 21, 1988	31	L
12	F	Tyler Laframboise	December 19, 1991	27	L
13	F	Anthony Novielli	July 20, 1991	27	L
19	F	Jonathan Pulicicchio (C)	November 2, 1987	31	R
91	F	Andrew Sisi	November 14, 1989	29	L
67	F	Daniel Tedesco	December 10, 1993	25	L
17	F	Francesco Zuccaro	October 17, 1990	28	L

Player statistics

Rank	#	Player	GP	G	A	P	PPG	SHG	ENG	PM
1	89	Frank Giustini	7	7	5	12	7	0	0	2
2	99	Daniel Setacci	7	3	8	11	3	0	0	8
3	66	Daniel Ponce	7	4	3	7	4	0	0	2
4	90	Massimo D’Ettore	7	2	4	6	2	0	0	2
5	19	Jonathan Pulicicchio	7	1	4	5	1	0	0	2
6	96	Adam Bevilacqua	7	0	4	4	0	0	0	2
7	32	Daniel Vernace	7	3	0	3	3	0	0	2
8	91	Andrew Sisi	7	2	1	3	2	0	0	10
9	67	Daniel Tedesco	7	1	2	3	1	0	0	14
10	61	Massimo Principe	7	1	1	2	1	0	0	0
11	17	Francesco Zuccaro	7	1	1	2	1	0	0	4
12	14	Stefano Alonzi	7	0	2	2	0	0	0	6
13	44	Peter Angiolella	7	1	0	1	1	0	0	2
14	92	Christopher Chirola	6	0	1	1	0	0	0	6
15	12	Tyler Laframboise	7	0	0	0	0	0	0	0
16	21	Matthew De Persiis	7	0	0	0	0	0	0	2
17	16	Marc Falzoi	7	0	0	0	0	0	0	2
18	39	Samuel Gagnon	7	0	0	0	0	0	0	2
19	49	Michael Antonali	7	0	0	0	0	0	0	2
20	6	Stefan Pittiglio	7	0	0	0	0	0	0	4
21	5	Adriano Fiacconi	7	0	0	0	0	0	0	4
22	13	Anthony Novielli	7	0	0	0	0	0	0	6

Goaltender statistics

Rank	#	Name	GP	Min	Shots	Saves	GA	Avg	Svs%	SO	A	PM
1	30	Markus Rocci	4	181	0	93	7	2.32	93.00	0	0	0
2	29	Anthony Flores	4	137	0	78	13	5.70	85.71	0	0	0

Match results

Date	Opponent	Result	Score
June 14, 2019	Canada	Loss	4–6
June 16, 2019	Switzerland	Win	3–2
June 17, 2019	Greece	Loss	2–4
June 18, 2019	Haiti	Win	8–1
June 20, 2019	Slovakia (Quarterfinals)	Loss	2–3
June 21, 2019	United States (Placement)	Win (OT)	5–4
June 22, 2019	Switzerland (5th place game)	Win (OT)	2–1
