= Nela Lopušanová =

Slovak ice hockey player (born 2008)

- Born: 26 February 2008 (age 18) Žilina, Slovakia
- Height: 170 cm (5 ft 7 in)
- Weight: 66 kg (146 lb; 10 st 6 lb)
- Position: Wing
- Shoots: Left
- NCAA team Former teams: University of Wisconsin; Bishop Kearney Selects; VLCI Žilina U16; MsHKM Žilina
- National team: Slovakia
- Playing career: 2022–present
Medal record
Representing Slovakia
Women's ball hockey
World Championship
Bronze medal – third place	2022 Canada

Nela Lopušanová (born 26 February 2008) is a Slovak ice hockey player who is a winger for the University of Wisconsin of the National Collegiate Athletic Association (NCAA). She gained the attention of the international ice hockey community at age fourteen with her remarkable performance at the 2023 IIHF U18 Women's World Championship, which included scoring the first Michigan goal at an IIHF women's event.

Lopušanová also plays elite ball hockey and is a member of the Slovak women's national ball hockey team.

== Ice hockey career ==
=== Youth ===
Lopušanová began figure skating on an outdoor pond at the age of two and started playing ice hockey before her fifth birthday. At the age of four, she attended a World Girls Ice Hockey Weekend hosted by the IIHF, prompting her to join a club team. She developed in the MsHKM Žilina organization, the minor and junior affiliate VLCI Žilina, in her hometown of Žilina.

At age thirteen, she made her senior league debut as a left winger with MsHKM Žilina ženy in the 2021–22 season of the Slovak Women's Extraliga (Slovak: Extraliga žien), the women's elite national league in Slovakia. Though she played just six games during the season, she ranked third in the league for scoring, amassing a staggering 25 goals and 15 assists, totaling 40 points and a league-leading average of 6.67 points per game. In addition to women's hockey, she also played as a centre with the men's under-16 affiliate of MHK Dolný Kubín in the Liga kadetov (renamed Liga starších žiakov AA in 2022). Playing against boys multiple years older than her, she recorded a goal and two assists in three games for a point-per-game pace.

In the 2022–23 campaign, she continued to build on her incredible scoring from the previous season. She ranked fifth in the Extraliga žien and second among MsHKM Žilina players in scoring, with 28 goals and 21 assists for 49 points in just eight games. In the final game of the season, she recorded 10 goals and 9 assists in a 24–1 landslide victory over Ice Dream Košice. Concurrently, she scored 18 goals and tallied 25 assists across fourteen games as a centre with VLCI Žilina U16 in the Liga starších žiakov AA, ranking second on the team for points. Her 43 points ranked 22nd in the league, though she played five fewer games than any higher-ranking player, and her 3.07 points per game was the highest of any player who appeared in more than ten games.

Her stellar performance led VLCI Žilina youth coach Jakub Kubiš to dub her "a wunderkind of the kind that is born only once per century." To cellebrate her achievements, the team started to sell her jersey at the team store.

In the fall of 2023, after receiving offers from multiple programs, Lopušanová moved to the United States to attend Bishop Kearney High School in Irondequoit, New York and play with the Bishop Kearney Selects ice hockey program. Her age made her eligible for the program's under-16 team but her skill earned her a place on the under-19 team, where she impressed immediately with 13 goals in her first 13 games. During the 2024 USA Hockey-Chipotle Girls Tier 1 19U National Championship, Lopušanová led the tournament with 14 points (2 goals, 12 assists) in 6 games, including one assist in the championship final loss to Shattuck-St Mary's. She finished the season with 47 points in 30 games. At the following year's tournament, Bishop Kearney won the championship and Lopušanová scored 13 points (10 goals, 3 assists).

=== Wisconsin Badgers ===
On 5 August 2024, Lopušanová announced her commitment to play college ice hockey at the University of Wisconsin beginning in the 2026–27 season. Lopuśanová made her debut with Wisconsin on September 25, 2026 and played her first home game on October 1, where she scored two goals and an assist in a 7–0 rout of Boston University. On October 5, she was named WCHA Rookie of the Week. On October 31, Lopušanová scored five goals in one game, tying Hilary Knight as only the second Badger to accomplish the feat. She is also only the second NCAA freshman to score five goals in a single game, after Katie Guay did so in 2002. The five goal, one assist effort earned Lopušanová her second WCHA Rookie of the Week honors as well as Forward of the Week.

== International play ==
=== Ice hockey ===
Lopušanová debuted with the Slovak national under-18 team at the 2023 IIHF World Women's U18 Championship in Östersund, Sweden. At just fourteen years of age, she was among the youngest players at the tournament – only seven other players were born in 2008 and three of the seven, Lenka Karkošková, Alica Juríková, and Lívia Nogová, were her teammates.

In Slovakia’s first game, she scored two goals and an assist against Japan to lead all skaters in scoring on the opening day of the tournament. Having grabbed international media attention in her first game, Lopušanová followed it up with "one of the most dominant performances ever seen by a player her age" against Switzerland, scoring a hat-trick and four points in a 4–1 win. She scored a goal and notched an assist in the third game against Czechia. In the quarterfinal game against Sweden, she became the first player to score a Michigan goal at a women's IIHF event.

With nine goals and twelve points, Lopušanová was the top point producer of the tournament. In recognition of her remarkable debut, she was selected as Best Forward by the tournament directorate and she was named an All-Star as well as tournament MVP by the press, despite Slovakia's sixth-place finish.

At the Friuli-Venezia Giulia 2023 edition of the European Youth Olympic Festival (EYOF), Lopušanová again led the tournament in scoring, propelling Slovakia to a silver medal.

Entering the 2024 IIHF World Women's U18 Championship with high expectations after garnering significant media attention the previous year, Lopušanová scored just two goals and three points in five games. The Slovak team was eliminated in a 2–0 quarterfinal loss to Finland, before losing the fifth-place match to Sweden.

Lopušanová returned to form at the 2025 IIHF World Women's U18 Championship with 5 goals and 6 assists. Nonetheless, Team Slovakia lost all matches, except for the relegation match against Japan, and finished in seventh place. Despite the poor finish, Lopušanová was again voted tournament MVP and named to the All Star team. She became the first player in tournament history to be named MVP twice.

Lopušanová was named team captain ahead of the 2026 IIHF U18 Women's World Championship where she tied Kendall Coyne Schofield for the all-time scoring record. During her four years at the tournament, Lopušanová's 22 goals amounted to nearly half of the team's overall 47 goals.

==== Senior team ====
Lopušanová made her senior national team debut in an Olympic qualifier game against Kazakhstan on 12 December 2024 where she scored four goals, including another Michigan goal. Building on this dominant performance, she became the most productive player of the tournament with 11 goals and 7 assists in 3 matches.

=== Ball hockey ===
Lopušanová made her international ball hockey debut with the Slovak national team at the 2022 Ball Hockey World Championship, at which Slovakia claimed the bronze medal. She led all Slovak players with 10 points in seven games, including three game winning goals and a hat-trick, and was named a tournament All Star.

She competed in the tournament again in 2024, where Slovakia finished in fourth place. She scored 3 goals in 8 games and her best performance was 2 goals against Switzerland.

== Personal life ==
Lopušanová was born on 26 February 2008 in the Strážov district of Žilina, Slovakia to parents Jozef Lopušan and Slávka Lopušanová. Her older brother, Šimon Lopušan (born 2002), is also an ice hockey player, a right winger, who plays for HK MŠK Indian Žiar nad Hronom in the Slovenská hokejová liga.

A self-proclaimed "hockey fanatic," she devotes nearly all her free time to the game. She wears number 88 on her sweater as an homage to her hockey idol, Patrick Kane.

Lopušanová was announced as a finalist for the European Olympic Committees' Piotr Nurowski Best Young European Athlete Prize in April 2023 and won the award with over 40% of the vote in the following month. She was named to the Forbes Slovakia 30 under 30 list, also in May 2023.

At Bishop Kearney, Lopušanová also played flag football and her team won the 2024 Division 2 NYSPHSAA Flag Football Championship. The Buffalo Bills nominated her for the Girls National Flag Football Player of the Year.

== Career statistics ==
=== Regular season and playoffs ===
			Regular season					Playoffs
Season	Team	League	GP	G	A	Pts	PIM	GP	G	A	Pts	PIM
2021–22	MHK Dolný Kubín U16	Liga kadetov	3	1	2	3	0	–	–	–	–	–
2021–22	MsHKM Žilina	Extraliga žien	6	25	15	40	4	–	–	–	–	–
2022–23	VLCI Žilina U16	Liga starších žiakov AA	13	18	25	43	6	–	–	–	–	–
2022–23	MsHKM Žilina	Extraliga žien	8	28	21	49	8	–	–	–	–	–
Liga starších žiakov AA totals			16	19	27	46	6	–	–	–	–	–
Extraliga žien totals			14	53	36	89	12	–	–	–	–	–

Sources: Elite Prospects, Hockey Slovakia

=== International ===
Year	Team	Event	Result	GP	G	A	Pts	PIM
2023	Slovakia	U18	6th	5	9	3	12	2
2023	Slovakia	EYOF	2nd place, silver medalist(s)	4	6	6	12	6
2024	Slovakia	U18	6th	5	2	1	3	3
2025	Slovakia	U18	7th	5	5	6	11	2
2026	Slovakia	U18	6th	4	6	1	7	2
Junior totals				23	28	17	45	15

== Awards and honors ==
=== Ice hockey ===
Award	Year	Ref
International
World U18 Championship – Best Forward	2023	
World U18 Championship – Most Valuable Player	2023, 2025	
World U18 Championship – Media All-Star Team	2023, 2025	
European Youth Olympic Festival – Best Forward	2023	
Piotr Nurowski Best Young European Athlete Prize	2023	

=== Ball hockey ===
Award	Year	Ref
International
World Championship Bronze Medal	2022	
World Championship All-Star Team	2022	
