= Petra Herzigová =

Czech ice hockey and ball hockey player (born 1986)

Personal information
- Born: 29 January 1986 (age 40) Znojmo, Czechoslovakia
- Height: 1.63 m (5 ft 4 in)
- Weight: 66 kg (146 lb; 10 st 6 lb)
Ice hockey career
- Position: Defense
- Shot: Right
- Played for: HC Slavia Praha; IF Sundsvall; SDE HF; HPK; HC Université Neuchâtel; HC Příbram
- National team: Czech Republic
- Playing career: 2004–2022

Sport
- Country: Czech Republic
- Sport: Ball hockey
- Position: Defense
- Shoots: Right
- Team: SHM HK Avir Praha
Medal record
Women's ball hockey
Representing Czech Republic
World Championship
Gold medal – first place	2017 Pardubice
Silver medal – second place	2022 Canada
Bronze medal – third place	2019 Košice
Bronze medal – third place	2011 Bratislava

Petra Herzigová (born 29 January 1986) is a Czech retired ice hockey and ball hockey player. She represented Czechia with the national ice hockey team and won medals at four World Championships with the Czech national ball hockey team.

== Ice hockey career ==
Herzigová's ice hockey club career was played with HC Příbram and HC Slavia Praha in the Czech Women's Extraliga (previously 1. liga ženského hokeje), HPK Kiekkonaiset in the Naisten SM-sarja (renamed Naisten Liiga in 2017, Auroraliiga in 2024), Sundsvall/Timrå and SDE Hockey in the Swedish Women's Hockey League (SDHL; previously Riksserien), and HC Université Neuchâtel in the Swiss Women's Hockey League A (SWHL A; renamed Women's League in 2019).

=== International play ===
She represented the Czechia at ten IIHF Women's World Championships, appearing at the Division I tournaments in 2007, 2008, and 2009; the Division II tournament in 2011; the Division I A tournaments in 2012, 2014, and 2015; and at the Top Division tournaments in 2013, 2016, and 2017.

Herzigová served as general manager of the Czech women's national under-16 ice hockey team during the 2018–19 and 2019–20 international seasons, including for the girls' ice hockey tournament at the 2020 Winter Youth Olympics.

== Ball hockey career ==
Herzigová most recently played with SHM HK Avir Praha in the Czech Women's Ball Hockey Extraliga.

She has participated in several ISBHF World Women Street & Ball Hockey Championships, winning bronze medals with the Czech national ball hockey team in 2011 and 2019, and a gold medal in 2017. She was named to the tournament All-Star Team at the 2011 World Championship.
