= Karolína Kosinová =

Czech ice hockey player (born 1998)

- Born: 21 May 1998 (age 28) Beroun, Czech Republic
- Height: 1.71 m (5 ft 7 in)
- Weight: 73 kg (161 lb; 11 st 7 lb)
- Position: Defense
- Shoots: Left
- Extraliga team Former teams: HC Baník Příbram: SDE Hockey; HC Slavia Praha; HC Berounské Lvice
- National team: Czech Republic
- Playing career: 2011–present
Medal record
Women's ice hockey
Representing Czech Republic
World Championship
Bronze medal – third place	2023 Canada
World University Games
Bronze medal – third place	2023 Lake Placid	Ice hockey
Women's ball hockey
Representing Czech Republic
World Championship
Silver medal – second place	2022 Canada

Karolína Kosinová (born 21 May 1998) is a Czech ice hockey and ball hockey player. She plays in the Czech Women's Extraliga with HC Baník Příbram and in the Regionalni liga junioru, the Czech third-tier men's national under-20 league, with HC Berounští Medvědi U20. Kosinová represents Czechia as a member of the national ice hockey team and the national ball hockey team, and has won world championship medals in both sports.

== Ice hockey ==
=== International play ===
As a junior player with the Czech national under-18 team, she participated in the IIHF U18 Women's World Championships in 2015 and 2016.

Kosinová made her debut with the senior national team at the IIHF Women's World Championship in 2019, one of just six players from the Czech Women's Extraliga to be selected.

In January 2023, Kosinová represented Czechia in the women's ice hockey tournament at the 2023 Winter World University Games. She contributed a goal across seven games to help the Czech team secure a bronze medal victory. Later that year, she participated in the 2023 IIHF Women's World Championship and won another Czech bronze medal.

=== Career statistics ===
==== International ====
Year	Team	Event	Result	GP	G	A	Pts	PIM
2015	Czechia	U18	4th	6	0	0	0	4
2016	Czechia	U18	5th	5	0	0	0	2
2019	Czechia	WC	6th	5	0	0	0	0
2023	Czechia	Uni	3rd place, bronze medalist(s)	7	1	0	1	8
2023	Czechia	WC	3rd place, bronze medalist(s)	3	0	0	0	0
2025	Czechia	WC	4th	2	0	0	0	0
Junior totals				11	0	0	0	6
Senior totals				17	1	0	1	8
