= Melanie Jue =

Canadian ice hockey player and coach

- Born: March 30, 1988 (age 38) Richmond, British Columbia, Canada
- Height: 5 ft 7 in (170 cm)
- Weight: 150 lb (68 kg; 10 st 10 lb)
- Position: Defence
- Shoots: Left
- Played for: KRS Vanke Rays; Cornell Big Red
- Coached for: China; Lindenwood Lady Lions
- Playing career: 2006–present
- Coaching career: 2012–present
Medal record
Women's ball hockey
Representing Canada
World Championship
Gold medal – first place	2022 Canada

Melanie Jue (born March 30, 1988) is a Canadian ice hockey defenceman and coach. She served as an assistant coach to the Chinese national ice hockey team during the 2021–22 season.

== Career ==
From 2006 to 2010, she attended Cornell University, where she was a two-sport varsity athlete in both ice hockey and field hockey.

Collegiate ice hockey

Jue competed with the Cornell Big Red women's ice hockey program, helping lead the team to the 2010 NCAA Women’s Frozen Four National Championship game. During that season, Cornell also captured the ECAC and Ivy League titles. She recorded at least one point in all three NCAA tournament games, including scoring both goals in the national championship game. She also assisted on the game-tying goal in the semifinal against Mercyhurst and scored the game-tying goal in the final against Minnesota-Duluth. Across 106 NCAA games, she recorded 41 points.

Collegiate field hockey

As a goaltender on Cornell’s field hockey team, Jue was a two-time first-team All-Ivy selection and earned NFHCA Second Team All-America (Mid-East Region) honours. In her senior season, she ranked second in the nation in save percentage (.841) and seventh in goals-against average (1.27). She helped lead the program to back-to-back 10-win seasons, including tying a school record with 11 victories in 2008.

Professional ice hockey

In 2017, she signed her first professional contract with Kunlun Red Star WIH of the Canadian Women’s Hockey League (CWHL). She recorded 10 points in 28 games in her rookie season, helping the club reach the 2018 Clarkson Cup final. She remained with the organization through its transition to the Vanke Rays and into the Zhenskaya Hockey League following the collapse of the CWHL in 2019. During her tenure with the franchise (2017–2022), she became the first player in team history to reach 100 games played and won a ZhHL championship in 2020.

Ball hockey

In addition to her ice hockey career, Jue represented Canada in ball hockey, winning multiple ISBHF World Championships and earning Best Defender honours at the 2022 ISBHF World Championships.

== Honours and achievements ==
- Collegiate
- Cornell University Athletics Hall of Fame (Class of 2021)
- NCAA Championship finalist (2010)
- ECAC Champion (2010)
- Ivy League Champion (2010)
- 2× Ivy League All-Star
- Professional
- Zhenskaya Hockey League Champion (2020)
- Clarkson Cup runner-up (2018)
- International and other
- NFHCA All-American, field hockey (Second Team, Mid-East Region)
- 3× ISBHF World Champion (Team Canada, ball hockey)
- ISBHF World Championship Best Defender (2022)
- 4× Team BC (ice hockey and field hockey)

== Personal life ==
Jue has represented Canada internationally at the International Street and Ball Hockey Federation women's world championships. Her cousin, Bryan Chiu, played for the Montreal Alouettes in the Canadian Football League.
