= Klára Seroiszková =

Czech ice hockey player (born 2001)

- Born: 25 January 2001 (age 25) Karviná, Czech Republic
- Height: 175 cm (5 ft 9 in)
- Weight: 72 kg (159 lb; 11 st 5 lb)
- Position: Defense
- Shoots: Left
- SDHL team Former teams: HV71; Göteborg HC; SK Karviná
- National team: Czech Republic
- Playing career: 2014–present
Medal record
Women's ice hockey
IIHF World Championship
Bronze medal – third place	2022 Denmark
Women's ball hockey
ISBHF World Championship
Silver medal – second place	2022 Canada

Klára Seroiszková (born 25 January 2001) is a Czech ice hockey player and member of the Czech national ice hockey team, currently playing in the Swedish Women's Hockey League (SDHL) with HV71 Dam.

Seroiszková made her senior national team debut at the 2021 IIHF Women's World Championship. As a junior player with the Czech national under-18 team, she participated in the IIHF Women's U18 World Championships in 2018 and 2019.

Her senior club career began in the Czech Women's Extraliga at age 13 with SK Karviná. Seroiszková has also played in the Czech national junior leagues with the under-16 and under-20 teams of SK Karviná.
