= Tereza Radová =

Czech ice hockey player

- Born: 22 November 2001 (age 24) Svitavy, Czech Republic
- Height: 174 cm (5 ft 9 in)
- Weight: 68 kg (150 lb; 10 st 10 lb)
- Position: Defense
- Shoots: Left
- SDHL team Former teams: Leksands IF; Göteborg HC; SK Karviná
- National team: Czech Republic
- Playing career: 2014–present
Medal record
Women's ice hockey
IIHF World Championship
Bronze medal – third place	2022 Denmark
Women's ball hockey
ISBHF World Championship
Silver medal – second place	2022 Canada

Tereza Radová (born 22 November 2001) is a Czech ice hockey player and member of the Czech national ice hockey team, currently playing in the Swedish Women's Hockey League (SDHL) with Leksands IF.

== Playing career ==
Radová made her senior national team debut at the 2021 IIHF Women's World Championship, scoring her first national team goal against Hungary in the preliminary round. At the Olympic qualification for the women's ice hockey tournament at the 2022 Winter Olympics, she helped the Czech Republic qualify to participate in the Olympic Games for the first time in team history. As a junior player with the Czech national under-18 team, she participated in the 2019 IIHF U18 Women's World Championship.

Her senior club career began in the 1. liga žen at age thirteen with the women's team of HC Uničov. Radová has also played in the Czech national junior leagues with the under-16 and under-17 teams of HC Olomouc and in the Czech Women's Extraliga with SK Karviná.
