= Sarah Davis (ice hockey) =

Canadian ice hockey player (born 1992)

- Born: June 23, 1992 (age 34) Paradise, Newfoundland, Canada
- Height: 5 ft 7 in (170 cm)
- Weight: 154 lb (70 kg; 11 st 0 lb)
- Position: Forward
- Shoots: Left
- CWHL team: Calgary Inferno
- National team: Canada
- Playing career: 2010–present
Medal record
World Championships
Silver medal – second place	2015 Sweden
Silver medal – second place	2016 Canada
Silver medal – second place	2017 United States
World U18 Championships
Gold medal – first place	2010 United States

Sarah Davis (born June 23, 1992) is a Canadian women's ice hockey player who made her international debut competing for the Canadian National Women's Under-18 team at the 2010 IIHF World Women's U18 Championship. She was named to the roster of the Canada women's national ice hockey team that competed at the 2015 IIHF Women's World Championship. She is the first women's ice hockey player from Newfoundland to be selected for the national team, and the first woman from the province to be part of a team to win the Clarkson Cup.

== Playing career ==
=== Hockey Canada ===
Davis was part of Canada's National Women's Under-18 Team which earned a gold medal at the 2010 IIHF World Women's U18 Championship in Chicago. As a member of the gold medal winning squad, a hockey card of her was featured in the Upper Deck 2011 World of Sports card series. In addition, she participated in the Canada Celebrates Event on June 30 in Edmonton which recognized the Canadian Olympic and World hockey champions from the 2009–10 season. She was a member of Canada’s National Women’s Development Team that won a gold medal at the 2015 Nations Cup (formerly known as the Meco Cup).

=== CWHL ===
Selected third overall by the Calgary Inferno in the 2014 CWHL Draft, Davis was named as one of the participants in the 2014 CWHL All-Star Game. She made her CWHL debut on October 18, 2014, in a road game against the Toronto Furies, logging her first career goal in a 5–4 shootout loss.

Appearing with the Calgary Inferno in the 2016 Clarkson Cup finals, she registered an assist as the Inferno emerged victorious in a convincing 8–3 final.

== Career statistics ==
=== Minnesota Golden Gophers (NCAA) ===
Season	GP	G	A	Pts	PIM	PPG	SHG	GWG
2010–11	38	11	21	32	20	4	0	3
2011–12	39	12	22	34	10	1	1	2
2012–13	38	7	18	25	36	1	1	2
2013–14	41	20	29	49	28	6	1	2

=== Calgary Inferno (CWHL) ===
Season	GP	G	A	Pts	PIM	PPG	SHG	GWG
2014–15	24	7	6	13	16	1	0	2

== Awards and honours ==
- 2014 All-WCHA Second Team

== Personal life ==
On April 17, 2015, a street in Davis' hometown of Paradise, Newfoundland and Labrador was renamed in her honour to Sarah Davis Way.
