= Barbora Patočková =

Czech ice hockey player

- Born: 23 September 1998 (age 28) Polička, Czech Republic
- Height: 1.73 m (5 ft 8 in)
- Weight: 64 kg (141 lb; 10 st 1 lb)
- Position: Forward
- Shoots: Left
- ČSLH team Former teams: SK Černošice; HC Slavia Praha
- National team: Czech Republic
- Playing career: 2014–present
Medal record
Representing Czech Republic
Women's ice hockey
World University Games
Bronze medal – third place	2023 Lake Placid	Ice hockey

Barbora Patočková (born 23 September 1998 in Polička) is a Czech ice hockey player for HC Příbram woman, HC Hvězda Praha and the Czech national team.

She participated at the 2016 IIHF Women's World Championship. She started play ice hockey with her brother Matouš Patočka in HC Slavoj Velké Popovice. Then they move to Slavia Prague.

She also participated at the 2017 Ball Hockey World Championship in Pardubice and won gold medal for Czech national team.
