= Slovakia women's national ball hockey team =

Slovakia
- Association: Slovak Ball Hockey Union
- General manager: Andrea Pastorková Rišová
- Head coach: Marián Hambálek
- Assistants: Daniel Lipár
- Team colors

World Championship
- Appearances: 10 (first in 2007)
- Best result: (gold) 1st (2011)

The Slovakia women's national ball hockey team (Slovak: Slovenské národné hokejbalové družstvo žien) represents the Czech Republic in international ball hockey competition. The team is organized by the Slovak Ball Hockey Union (Slovenská hokejbalová únia—SHbÚ) – a member of the International Street and Ball Hockey Federation (ISBHF) – and participates in the Ball Hockey World Championship.

== History ==
The team has competed in every Women's Ball Hockey World Championship since the inaugural tournament in 2007, which was hosted in Ratingen, Germany.

Slovakia hosted the 2011 Worlds in Bratislava and the team captured its first gold medalat the tournament, after defeating Canada 1–0 in the final on home soil.

=== World Championship ===
Year	Location	Result	Position
2007	Ratingen, Germany	Runners-up	2nd place, silver medalist(s)
2009	Plzeň, Czech Republic	Runners-up	2nd place, silver medalist(s)
2011	Bratislava, Slovakia	Champions	1st place, gold medalist(s)
2013	St. John's, Canada	Runners-up	2nd place, silver medalist(s)
2015	Zug, Switzerland	Bronze Medal	3rd place, bronze medalist(s)
2017	Pardubice, Czech Republic	Fourth Place	4th
2019	Košice, Slovakia	Fourth Place	4th
2022	Laval, Canada	Bronze Medal	3rd place, bronze medalist(s)
2024	Visp and Raron, Switzerland	Fourth Place	4th
2026	Ostrava, Czech Republic	Fourth Place	4th

== Team ==
=== Head coaches ===
- 2015: Jaroslav Kolibík
- 2017: Beáta Rišianová
- 2019: Marián Hambálek
- 2022: Marián Hambálek
- 2024: Marián Hambálek
- 2026: Marián Hambálek

== Awards and honors ==
=== World Championship ===
Five individual awards are selected by the tournament organizing committee of each Ball Hockey World Championship: the top player at each position, the most valuable player (MVP) of the tournament, and the World Championship's top scorer. The following table lists awards won by players representing Slovakia.

Award	Winner	Year
Best Defender	Ivana Gajdošová	2009
Best Defender	Petra Pavlovičová	2013
Best Goalkeeper	Zuzana Tomčíková	2017
Best Goalkeeper	Andrea Pastorková Rišová	2022

==== All Star selections ====
The tournament organizing committee of each Ball Hockey World Championship also announces five players selected to the All-Star Team – one goalkeeper, two defenders, and three forwards.

- 2009: Michaela Matejová (D), Petra Pavlovičová (F), Zuzana Tomčíková (G)
- 2013: Ivana Gajdošová (D), Zuzana Tomčíková (G)
- 2019: Lucia Záborská (D)
- 2022: Nela Lopušanová (F)
- 2024: Patrícia Mária Dzurinová (F)
- 2026: Aleksandra Lidskaia (F)
