= Brooke Wolejko =

American ice hockey goaltender

- Born: June 18, 1996 (age 30) South Windsor, Connecticut, United States
- Height: 175 cm (5 ft 9 in)
- Position: Goaltender
- PHF team: Metropolitan Riveters
- Played for: Connecticut Whale; SUNY-Plattsburgh; St. Lawrence University
- Playing career: 2019–present

Brooke Wolejko is an American ice hockey goaltender, currently playing for the Metropolitan Riveters of the PHF.

== Career ==
Wolejko began playing as a goaltender as soon as she started playing hockey, sticking with the position even as players on her youth team were rotated through different positions.

From 2014 to 2017, she attended St. Lawrence University, serving as a backup goalie for the university's NCAA women's hockey programme. She transferred to SUNY-Plattsburgh for her final year of university. That season, she led all NCAA Division III goaltenders in goals against average and save percentage.

After graduating, she initially thought her competitive hockey career was over and moved to Maine for her work. She would continue playing in a local men's league, but soon found that she missed the speed and intensity of her previous leagues. After being spotted at a ball hockey tournament along with Sarah Hughson and Kayla Meneghin, the Connecticut Whale reached out to her, and she signed her first professional contract with the team ahead of the 2019–20 NWHL season. In her rookie professional season, she set a Connecticut team record for saves and finished fourth in the league in save percentage, averaging over 38 saves per game, and leading the Whale to an upset victory over the Buffalo Beauts in the playoffs to reach a semi-final match against the Minnesota Whitecaps. The only goalie to have forced the near-undefeated Boston Pride into a shootout during the regular season, she was named one of the NWHL Fans’ Three Stars of the Season.

She re-signed with the Whale ahead of the 2020–21 NWHL season, the first Whale player to re-sign for the season.

== Personal life ==
Her sister, Kristin Wolejko, played university hockey for the University of Southern Maine in the late-2000s.
