= International Street and Ball Hockey Federation =

International sports governing body

- Abbreviation: ISBHF
- Formation: 1993; 33 years ago
- Type: Sports federation
- Purpose: Governing body of street and ball hockey
- Headquarters: Prague, Czech Republic
- Region served: Worldwide
- Members: 41 national associations
- Official languages: English
- President: Elio Pascuzzo
- Vice Presidents: Miroslav Dragun; Vít Řezáč
- Main organ: Board of Directors
- Website: ISBHF.com

The International Street and Ball Hockey Federation (ISBHF) is the international sports governing body for street and ball hockey. It was established in June 1993 in Oshawa, Canada. The ISBHF is headquartered in Prague, Czech Republic, and has been recognized as the official governing body by the International Ice Hockey Federation.

Elio Pascuzzo of Canada is the current ISBHF President following his election to the post for the 2022–2024 term.

== Tournaments ==
The ISBHF organizes world championships for a number of competition classes and other tournaments around the world. These tournaments include:

=== Men's ===
- World Championship - A & B Pool
- Masters World Championship (players aged 35 and over)
- Legends World Championship (players aged 45 and over)
- U23 World Championship
- U20 World Championship
- U18 World Championship
- U16 World Championship
- U16 World Cup
- Asian Championship
- ALPA European Cup (U16, U20, U23)

=== Women's ===
- World Championship
- Masters World Championship (players aged 35 and over)
- Legends World Championship (players aged 45 and over)
- U20 (U21) World Championship
- U18 World Cup
- U16 World Championship

== Tournament history ==
=== ISBHF World Championships ===
==== Men ====
Year	Host city	Final standings		
Year	Host city	World Champion	Silver Medal	Bronze Medal
1996	Bratislava (Slovakia)	Canada	Czech Republic	Slovakia
1998	Litoměřice (Czech Republic)	Czech Republic	Slovakia	Canada
1999	Zvolen (Slovakia)	Slovakia	Canada	Czech Republic
2001	Toronto (Canada)	Canada	Czech Republic	Slovakia
2003	Sierre (Switzerland)	Canada	Czech Republic	Slovakia
2005	Pittsburgh (USA)	Canada	Slovakia	Italy
2007	Ratingen (Germany)	Canada	Czech Republic	Slovakia
2009	Plzeň (Czech Republic)	Czech Republic	India	Slovakia
2011	Bratislava (Slovakia)	Czech Republic	Canada	Slovakia
2013	St. John's (Canada)	Slovakia	Czech Republic	Canada
2015	Zug (Switzerland)	Slovakia	United States	Czech Republic
2017	Pardubice (Czech Republic)	Slovakia	Canada	Czech Republic
2019	Košice (Slovakia)	Slovakia	Finland	Canada
2022	Laval (Canada)	Canada	Czech Republic	United States
2024	Visp (Switzerland)	Canada	Czech Republic	United States
2026	Ostrava (Czech Republic)	United States	Czech Republic	Finland

==== Women ====
Year	Host city	Final standings		
Year	Host city	World Champion	Silver Medal	Bronze Medal
2007	Ratingen (Germany)	Canada	Slovakia	Czech Republic
2009	Plzeň (Czech Republic)	Canada	Slovakia	Czech Republic
2011	Bratislava (Slovakia)	Slovakia	Canada	Czech Republic
2013	St. John's (Canada)	Canada	Slovakia	Czech Republic
2015	Zug (Switzerland)	Canada	Czech Republic	Slovakia
2017	Pardubice (Czech Republic)	Czech Republic	United States	Canada
2019	Košice (Slovakia)	Canada	United States	Czech Republic
2022	Laval (Canada)	Canada	Czech Republic	Slovakia
2024	Visp (Switzerland)	United States	Czech Republic	Canada
2026	Ostrava (Czech Republic)	United States	Czech Republic	Canada

=== U23 World Championships ===
Year	Host City	Final standings		
Year	Host City	World Champion	Silver Medal	Bronze Medal
2023	Liberec (Czech Republic)	Czech Republic	Slovakia	United States
2025	Hradec Králové (Czech Republic)	Czech Republic	Canada	Slovakia

=== U20 World Championships ===
==== Men ====
Year	Host City	Final standings		
Year	Host City	World Champion	Silver Medal	Bronze Medal
2000	Kralupy nad Vltavou (Czech Republic)	Canada	Czech Republic	Slovakia
2002	Champéry (Switzerland)	Czech Republic	Slovakia	Canada
2004	Martin (Slovakia)	Slovakia	Czech Republic	Canada
2006	Aosta (Italy)	United States	Slovakia	Czech Republic
2008	St. John's (Canada)	Canada	Slovakia	United States
2010	Villach (Austria)	Canada	Czech Republic	Slovakia
2012	Písek (Czech Republic)	Canada	Czech Republic	United States
2014	Bratislava (Slovakia)	Slovakia	Czech Republic	United States
2016	Sheffield (United Kingdom)	Slovakia	Canada	Czech Republic
2018	St. John's (Canada)	Czech Republic	Canada	Slovakia
2023	Liberec (Czech Republic)	Canada	Slovakia	Czech Republic
2025	Poprad (Slovakia]])	Canada	Czech Republic	United States

==== Women ====
Year	Host City	Final standings		
Year	Host City	World Champion	Silver Medal	Bronze Medal
2018	Přerov & Zlín (Czech Republic)	Czech Republic	Canada	Slovakia
2023^{†}	Liberec (Czech Republic)	Canada	Slovakia	Czech Republic
2025	Poprad (Slovakia)	Czech Republic	Canada	Slovakia

^{†} The 2023 tournament was played at the under-21 level, rather than under-20.

=== U18 World Championships ===
Year	Host City	Final standings		
Year	Host City	World Champion	Silver Medal	Bronze Medal
2008	Zvolen (Slovakia)	Canada	Czech Republic	Slovakia
2010	Most (Czech Republic)	Slovakia	Canada	Czech Republic
2012	Písek (Czech Republic)	Canada	Slovakia	Czech Republic
2014	Bratislava (Slovakia)	Slovakia	Czech Republic	United States
2016	Sheffield (United Kingdom)	Canada	Slovakia	Czech Republic
2018	St. John's (Canada)	Canada	Czech Republic	Slovakia
2023	Liberec (Czech Republic)	Czech Republic	Slovakia	Canada
2024	Žilina (Slovakia)	Canada	United States	Czech Republic
2026	Banská Bystrica (Slovakia)	United States	Czech Republic	Slovakia

=== U16 World Championships ===
==== Men ====
Year	Host City	Final standings		
Year	Host City	World Champion	Silver Medal	Bronze Medal
2008	Zvolen (Slovakia)	Canada	Slovakia	Czech Republic
2010	Most (Czech Republic)	Canada	Slovakia	Czech Republic
2012	Písek (Czech Republic)	Slovakia	Czech Republic	Canada
2014	Bratislava (Slovakia)	Slovakia	Canada	Czech Republic
2016	Sheffield (United Kingdom)	Canada	Slovakia	United States
2018	Přerov & Zlín (Czech Republic)	Canada	Slovakia	Czech Republic
2023	Liberec (Czech Republic)	Czech Republic	Canada	United States
2024	Žilina (Slovakia)	Canada	Slovakia	United States
2025	Hradec Králové (Czech Republic)	Czech Republic	United States	Slovakia
2026	Banská Bystrica (Slovakia)	Slovakia	Czech Republic	Canada (Red)

==== Women ====
Year	Host City	Final standings		
Year	Host City	World Champion	Silver Medal	Bronze Medal
2026	Sheffield (United Kingdom)	Canada	Slovakia	Czech Republic
