= Lucie Manhartová =

Czech ice hockey player

- Born: 14 May 1991 (age 34) Prague, Czechoslovakia
- Height: 173 cm (5 ft 8 in)
- Weight: 74 kg (163 lb; 11 st 9 lb)
- Position: Wing
- Shoots: Left
- Extraliga team Former teams: HC Příbram; HC Slavia Praha; Sundsvall/Timrå; SDE HF; Biryusa Krasnoyarsk; Norwich Cadets
- National team: Czech Republic
- Playing career: 2007–present

Lucie Manhartová (born 14 May 1991) is a Czech ice hockey player and captain of HC Příbram in the Czech Women's Extraliga. She has previously played in the Elite Women's Hockey League (EWHL) with HC Slavia Praha, the NCAA Division III with the Norwich Cadets women's ice hockey program, the Russian Women's Hockey League (RWHL) with Biryusa Krasnoyarsk, and the Swedish Women's Hockey League (SDHL; previously Riksserien) with SDE Hockey and Sundsvall/Timrå.

As a member of the Czech national team, she participated in the Top Division tournaments of the IIHF Women's World Championship in 2013, 2016, and 2017; the Division I Group A tournaments in 2012, 2014, and 2015; the Division I tournaments in 2008 and 2009; and the Division II tournament in 2011.

== Awards and honors ==
- 2017 Ball Hockey World Championship All-Tournament Team Selection
- 2019 Ball Hockey World Championship All-Tournament Team Selection
