= Czech Women's Extraliga =

Premier women's ice hockey league in Czechia

Women's Extraliga Extraliga žen
- Formerly: 1. liga ženského hokeje, 1989–2017
- Sport: Ice hockey
- Founded: 1984
- Owner: Czech Ice Hockey Association
- President: Tereza Menčíková
- No. of teams: 6
- Country: Czech Republic
- Most recent champion: HC Bobři Valašské Meziříčí (2025–26)
- Most titles: HC Slavia Praha
- Level on pyramid: 1
- Relegation to: 1. liga žen
- International cup: European Women's Champions Cup

The Czech Women's Ice Hockey Extraliga (Czech: Česká extraliga ženského ledního hokeje) or Women's Extraliga (Extraliga žen) is the premier league for women's ice hockey in the Czech Republic. Founded in 1985, it was known as the 1. liga ženského hokeje from 1989 until 2017, at which time the league came under the oversight of the Czech Ice Hockey Association and the current name was adopted. The victorious team of the Women's Extraliga is named Champion of the Czech Republic (Czech: Mistr České republiky, MČR).

== History ==
The Czech Women's Extraliga traces its origins to the Turnaj v Klatovech (lit. 'Tournament in Klatovy'), in which teams from across Czechoslovakia gathered in Klatovy to play a traditional tournament. First contested in 1985, the inaugural champion of the Turnaj v Klatovech was TJ Kovo Praha from Prague. TJ Sparta ČKD Praha, the representative women's team of HC Sparta Praha, won the tournament in 1986.

In 1986–87, a season format was adopted with games played on weekends. The top-ranked team from the regular season was named league champion. In 1987 and 1988, the league champions were awarded the Pohár ÚV SSM (Czech: Pohár Ústředního výboru Socialistického svazu mládeže, lit. 'Cup of the Central Committee of the Socialist Youth Union'). TJ Lokomotiva Beroun from Beroun won the Pohár ÚV SSM in both the 1986–87 and 1987–88 seasons.

During the 1988–89 season, teams competed for the Pohár ČSSS (Pohár Československé státní statky, 'Cup of the Czechoslovak State Estates'). TJ Škoda Plzeň won the Pohár ČSSS in 1989.

Ahead of the 1989–90 season, the league was named the 1. liga ženského hokeje (lit. 'First Women's Hockey League'), shortened to 1. liga žen or 1. liga. TJ Lokomotiva Beroun were the first champions of the 1. liga in 1990.

A second division was established in 1992 and a system of promotion and relegation was implemented whereby the top ranked team from the second division was promoted and the bottom ranked team from the top division was relegated at the end of each season.

Following the dissolution of Czechoslovakia in 1993, the 1. liga became the highest level of women's ice hockey in the Czech Republic.

The two-division system was reconfigured in 1996, moving from skill-based divisions to geographic conferences. The two conferences, called Čechy (lit. 'Bohemia') and Morava (lit. 'Moravia'), used the traditional boundaries between the Czech lands of the same names to organize teams. Each conference played a closed series and the top teams from each would then move on to the finals.

During the 2010–11 and 2011–12 seasons, the number of teams in the Čechy conference led it to be further subdivided into skupina A (sk. A; 'Group A') and skupina B (sk. B; 'Group B'). Skupina A was for the most skilled teams and engaged in a system of promotion and relegation with skupina B. The Morava conference did not experience the boom in teams seen in the west and no subdivisions were implemented.

A new division system was implemented in 2012 that introduced a national elite level, called the 1. liga - TOP divize. The TOP divize represented a new division above the previous conferences and divisions, which were renamed and continued as the lower levels of the 1. liga. The previous skupina A and skupina B of the Čechy conference were designated skupina A1 and skupina A2, respectively, and the Morava conference was designated skupina B. Together the new 1. liga - sk. A1 and 1. liga - sk. B comprised the skill tier below the 1. liga - TOP divize, while 1. liga - sk. A2 represented the lowest tier of skill. Promotion and relegation between the TOP divize and skupina A1/B was possible via a best of three series played by the lowest ranked TOP divize team and the winner of the qualification series between the top teams from skupina A1 and skupina B. Likewise, promotion and relegation between skupina A1 and skupina A2 was also possible.

The 1. liga was organized and operated by the Association of Women's Hockey League Clubs (Asociace Ligových Klubů Ženského Hokej, ALKŽH) during the 2010s until the league came under the oversight of the Czech Ice Hockey Association in 2017. At that time, the 1. liga was divided into three separate leagues: the elite Women's Extraliga, the second-tier 1. liga žen, and the third-tier 2. liga žen.

=== League name history ===
Top women's ice hockey competition/league in Czechoslovakia

- 1985–1986: Turnaj v Klatovech
- 1986–1988: Pohár ÚV SSM
- 1988–1989: Pohár ČSSS
- 1989–1993: 1. liga

Top women's ice hockey league in the Czech Republic

- 1993–2012: 1. liga
- 2012–2017: 1. liga - TOP divize
- since 2017: Extraliga

== Teams ==
=== 2025–26 season ===
Location of Women's Extraliga teams in the Czech Republic.

HC Berounské Lvice qualified for the 2024–25 Extraliga žen season and the club continued to hold league rights but the team opted to instead participate in the 2024–25 season of the second-tier league, the 1. liga žen.

Team	Location	Home venue
HC 2001 Kladno	Kladno	ČEZ Stadion
HC Baník Příbram	Příbram	Zimní stadion Příbram
HC Bobři Valašské Meziříčí	Valašské Meziříčí	Zimní stadion Valašské Meziříčí
HC Falcons Sokol Karviná	Karviná	Zimní stadion Karviná
HC Roudnice nad Labem	Roudnice nad Labem	Zimní stadion Roudnice nad Labem
HC TJ Tesla Pardubice	Pardubice	Enteria arena
SK Kadaň	Kadaň	Zimní stadion Kadaň

==== Team name history ====
- HC 2001 Kladno

1986–1991: TJ Poldi SONP Kladno (Tělovýchovná jednota Poldi Spojené ocelárny, národní podnik Kladno)
1991–1998: HC Kladno 1988
1998–2001: HC Velvana Rebels Kladno
since 2001: HC 2001 Kladno

- HC Berounské Lvice

1985–1992: TJ Lokomotiva Beroun
1992–1993: HC Amazonky Lokomotiva Beroun
1993–1996: HC H+S Beroun
since 1996: HC Berounské Lvice

=== Former participants ===
- HLC Bulldogs Brno (Brno), 2000–2017
- HC Býci Karviná (Karviná), 2000–2021

1999–2017: SK Karviná
2017–2021: HC Býci Karviná

- HC Dračice Karlovy Vary (Karlovy Vary), –2012
- HC Slavia Praha (Prague), 2002–2018

2002–2003: HC Letňany Sýkorky
2003–2018: HC Slavia Praha

- HC Slezan Opava (Opava),
- HC TJ Tesla Pardubice, (Pardubice),
- HC Vsetín (Vsetín), –2012
- TJ BKV Havlíčkův Brod (Havlíčkův Brod),
- TJ Kovo Praha (Prague), 1984–
- TJ Sparta ČKD Praha (Prague), 1985–
- HC Plzeň (Plzeň), 1987–

1987–1991: TJ Škoda Plzeň
1991–1994: HC Škoda Plzeň
1994–1995: HC Interconnex Plzeň
1995–1997: HC ZKZ Plzeň (Hockey Club Západočeské keramické závody Plzeň)
1997–2003: HC Keramika Plzeň
2003–2009: HC Lasselsberger Plzeň
2009–2012: HC Plzeň 1929
since 2012: HC Škoda Plzeň

- HC Verva Litvínov (Litvínov), 2010–2014 & 2017–2023

1986–1990: TJ CHZ Litvínov (Tělovýchovná jednota Chemické závody Litvínov)
1990–1991: HC CHZ Litvínov
1991–1994: HC Chemopetrol Litvínov
1994–1996: HC Litvínov, s.r.o.
1996–2007: HC Chemopetrol, a.s.
2007–2009: HC Litvínov
2009–2011: HC BENZINA Litvínov
2011–2023: HC Verva Litvínov

== Champions ==
=== Champions by season ===
Season	(gold) Champion	(silver) Runner-up	(bronze) Third Place
Turnaj v Klatovech
1985	TJ Kovo Praha		
1986	TJ Sparta ČKD Praha		
Pohár ÚV SSM
1986–87	TJ Lokomotiva Beroun	TJ Škoda Plzeň	TJ Poldi SONP Kladno
1987–88	TJ Lokomotiva Beroun		TJ Poldi SONP Kladno
Pohár ČSSS
1988–89	TJ Škoda Plzeň	TJ Locomotive Beroun	TJ Poldi SONP Kladno
1. liga žen
1989–90	TJ Lokomotiva Beroun	TJ Poldi SONP Kladno	TJ Škoda Plzeň
1990–91	TJ Lokomotiva Beroun	TJ Škoda Plzeň	TJ BKV Havlíčkův Brod
1991–92	TJ Lokomotiva Beroun	TJ BKV Havlíčkův Brod	TJ Škoda Plzeň
1992–93	TJ Lokomotiva VČS Beroun	TJ BKV Havlíčkův Brod	TJ Škoda Plzeň
1993–94	HC Škoda Plzeň	Pardubice	HC Chemopetrol Litvínov
1994–95	HC Interconex Plzeň	Pardubice	HC Litvínov
1995–96	HC Litvínov	TJ Lokomotiva Beroun	Pardubice
1996–97	HC Chemopetrol Litvínov	Hokej Brno	HC Kladno 1988
1997–98	HC Chemopetrol Litvínov	TJ Škoda Plzeň	HC Slezan Opava
1998–99	HC Chemopetrol Litvínov	TJ Lokomotiva Beroun	HC Velvana Rebels Kladno
1999-2000	HC Chemopetrol Litvínov	Pardubice	HC Slezan Opava
2000–01	HC Slezan Opava	HC Chemopetrol Litvínov	HC Berounské Lvice
2001–02	HC Slezan Opava	HC Chemopetrol Litvínov	HC Berounské Lvice
2002–03	HC Slezan Opava	HC Chemopetrol Litvínov	HC 2001 Kladno
2003–04	HC Chemopetrol Litvínov	HC Slezan Opava	HC Berounské Lvice
2004–05	HC Slezan Opava	HC Berounské Lvice	SK Karviná
2005–06	HC Slezan Opava	HC Slavia Praha	HLC Bulldogs Brno
2006–07	HC Slavia Praha	HC 2001 Kladno	HF Slezan Opava
2007–08	HC Slavia Praha	HC 2001 Kladno	HLC Bulldogs Brno
2008–09	HC Slavia Praha	HC 2001 Kladno	
2009–10	HC Slavia Praha	HC 2001 Kladno	SK Karviná
2010–11	HC Slavia Praha	SK Karviná	
2011–12	HC Slavia Praha	SK Karviná	HC 2001 Kladno
2012–13	SK Karviná	HC Slavia Praha	HC 2001 Kladno
2013–14	SK Karviná	HC Slavia Praha	HC 2001 Kladno
2014–15	HC Slavia Praha	SK Karviná	HC Verva Litvínov
2015–16	HC Slavia Praha	SK Karviná	HC Verva Litvínov
2016–17	HC Slavia Praha	SK Karviná	HC Verva Litvínov
Extraliga žen
2017–18	HC Slavia Praha	HC Býci Karviná	HC 2001 Kladno
2018–19	HC Příbram	HC Býci Karviná	HC 2001 Kladno
2019–20	HC Příbram	HC Býci Karviná	HC 2001 Kladno
2020–21	Season not completed due to COVID-19 pandemic.		
2021–22	HC Příbram	HC Falcons Sokol Karviná	HC 2001 Kladno
2022–23	HC Příbram	HC Falcons Sokol Karviná	HC 2001 Kladno
2023–24	HC Příbram	HC Falcons Sokol Karviná	SK Kadaň
2024–25	HC Příbram	HC Falcons Sokol Karviná	HC Roudnice nad Labem
2025–26	HC Bobři Valašské Meziříčí	HC Příbram	SK Kadaň

=== All-time champions ===
Team	Titles	Years won
HC Slavia Praha	10	2007, 2008, 2009, 2010, 2011, 2012, 2015, 2016, 2017, 2018
HC Berounské Lvice	6	1987, 1988, 1990, 1991, 1992, 1993
HC Litvínov	6	1996, 1997, 1998, 1999, 2000, 2004
HC Příbram	6	2019, 2020, 2022, 2023, 2024, 2025
HC Slezan Opava	5	2001, 2002, 2003, 2005, 2006
HC Škoda Plzeň	3	1989, 1994, 1995
HC Býci Karviná	2	2013, 2014
HC Bobři Valašské Meziříčí	1	2026
TJ Kovo Praha	1	1985
TJ Sparta Praha	1	1986

== League records ==
All-time regular season records of the Women's Extraliga since the league came under the oversight of the Czech Ice Hockey Association in 2017. Statistics are valid through the 2025–26 season.

=== Single-season records ===
- Most points: Alexandra Halounová, 65 points (20 games; 2025–26)
- Most points, defenseman: Karolína Kosinová, 38 points (17 games; 2022–23)
- Most goals: Adéla Mynaříková, 32 goals (20 games; 2025–26)
- Most assists: Barbora Bartáková, 44 assists (14 games; 2024–25)
- Most penalty minutes: Šarlota Tomasco, 70 PIM (10 games; 2023–24)
- Best save percentage, eight or more games played: Veronika Hladíková, .943 SVS% (10 games; 2017–18)
- Best goals against average, eight or more games played: Julie Pejšová, 0.60 GAA (8 games; 2024–25)
- Most shutouts: Julie Pejšová, 4 shutouts (10 games; 2018–19)

=== Career records ===
- Most points: Alexandra Halounová, 262 points (103 games; 2017–2026)
- Most points, defenceman: Karolína Kosinová, 126 points (84 games; 2017–2026)
- Best points per game, ten or more games played: Lucie Gruntová, 2.92 points per game (51 games; 2023–2026)
- Most career games played, skater: Nozomi Kiribuchi, 124 games (2017–2026)
- Most goals: Klára Chmelová, 128 goals (113 games; 2017–2026)
- Most assists: Alexandra Halounová, 148 assists (103 games; 2017–2026)
- Most penalty minutes: Patricie Škorpíková, 106 PIM (101 games; 2017–2026)
- Most games played, goaltender: Adéla Krejcárková, 61 games (2018–2026)
- Best save percentage, fifteen or more games played: Kristýna Bláhová, .944 SV% (30 games; 2017–2024)
- Best goals against average, fifteen or more games played: Kristýna Bláhová, 1.17 GAA (30 games; 2017–2024)
- Most shutouts: Julie Pejšová, 10 shutouts (40 games; 2018–2026)

=== All-time scoring leaders ===
The top-ten regular season point-scorers in Women's Extraliga history, from the 2017–18 season through the 2025–26 season.

Note: Nat = Nationality; Pos = Position; S = Seasons played; GP = Games played; G = Goals; A = Assists; Pts = Points; PIM = Penalty in minutes

Points
Nat	Player	Pos	S	GP	G	A	Pts	PIM
(Czech Republic)	Alexandra Halounová	F	8	103	114	148	262	101
(Czech Republic)	Sandra Halounová	F	8	104	113	123	236	36
(Czech Republic)	Klára Chmelová	F	8	113	128	94	222	56
(Czech Republic)	Barbora Bartáková	F	7	66	68	110	178	12
(Czech Republic)	Lucie Gruntová	F	3	51	76	73	149	70
(Czech Republic)	Patricie Škorpíková	F	8	101	84	46	130	106
(Czech Republic)	Karolína Kosinová	D	8	84	24	102	126	44
(Czech Republic)	Tereza Mazancová	F	8	78	53	67	120	14
(Czech Republic)	Denisa Habartová	D	8	86	31	75	106	38
(Czech Republic)	Barbora Patočková	F	5	46	39	59	98	30
