= Zuzana Tomčíková =

Slovak ice hockey player (born 1988)

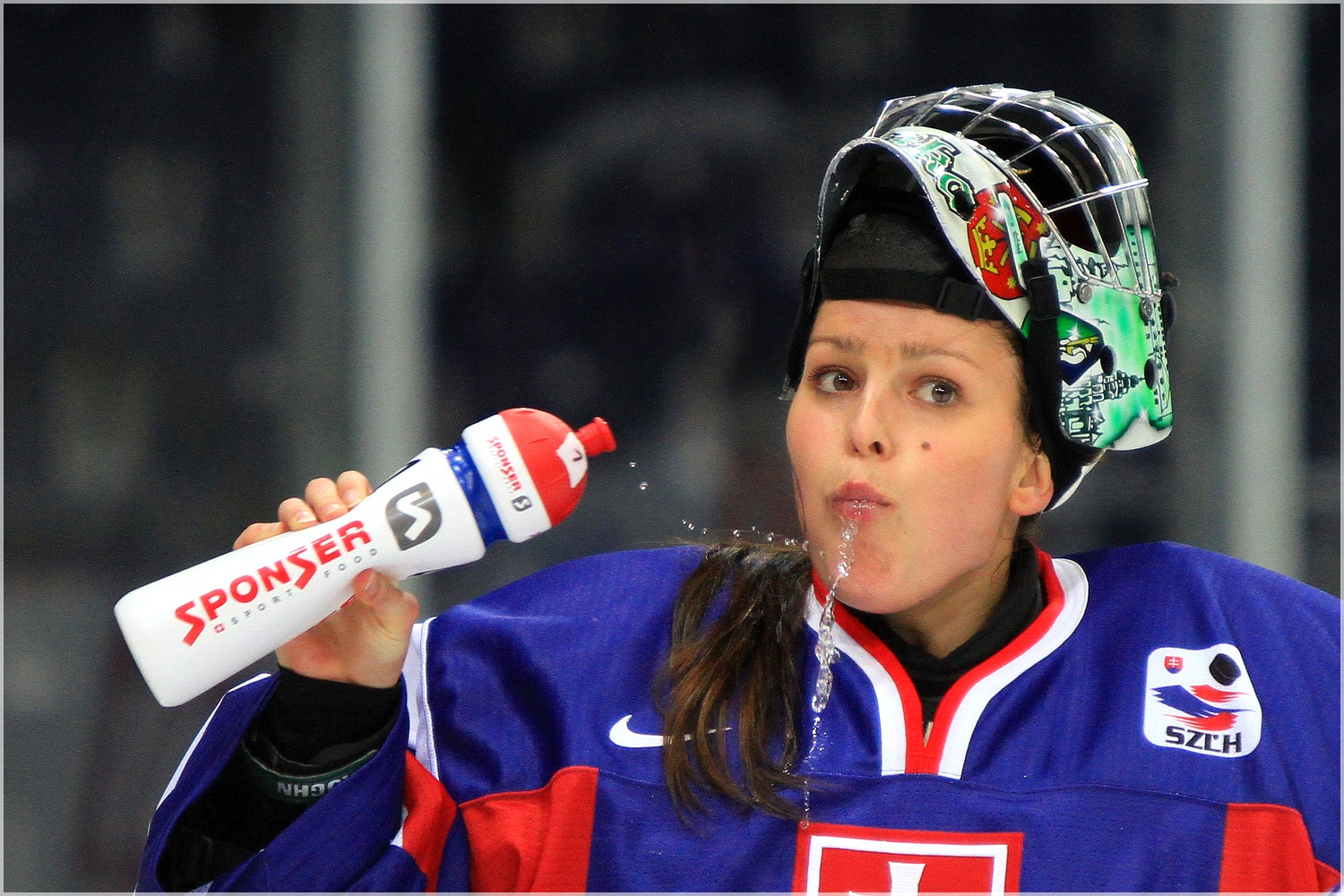
- Tomčíková representing Slovakia at the 2011 IIHF Women's World Championship
- Born: 23 April 1988 (age 38) Zvolen, Czechoslovakia
- Height: 180 cm (5 ft 11 in)
- Weight: 73 kg (161 lb; 11 st 7 lb)
- Position: Goaltender
- Caught: Left
- Played for: HC Petržalka; Paneuropa Kings; HC Tornado; Bemidji State Beavers; Linköping HC; HC Slovan Bratislava
- National team: Slovakia
- Playing career: 2008–2015
Medal record
Representing Slovakia
Women's ice hockey
Winter Universiade
Bronze medal – third place	2011 Turkey
Women's ball hockey
World Championship
Gold medal – first place	2011 Slovakia
Silver medal – second place	2013 Canada
Silver medal – second place	2009 Czech Republic
Bronze medal – third place	2015 Switzerland

Zuzana Tomčíková (born 23 April 1988) is a Slovak retired ice hockey and ball hockey goaltender, currently working as a sports specialist with the Slovak Olympic and Sports Committee. She was a member of the Slovak women's national ice hockey team from age 12 to 26, and represented Slovakia in the 2010 Winter Olympics and at several IIHF Women's World Championships. As a member of the Slovak women's national ball hockey team, she won silver medals at the Ball Hockey World Championship in 2009 and 2013, bronze in 2015, and placed fourth in 2017. She received the Torriani Award from the International Ice Hockey Federation in 2026, in recognition of her international career.

Tomčíková's ice hockey club career was played with HC Slovan Bratislava of the Elite Women's Hockey League (EWHL), Linköping HC Dam of the Swedish Riksserien, the Bemidji State Beavers of the NCAA Division I, HC Tornado of the Russian Women's Hockey League, and HC Petržalka of the Slovak Women's Extraliga, in addition to a season played in the men's European University Hockey League (EUHL) with the Paneuropa Kings of Pan-European University.

== Playing career ==
During some of her teen years, Tomčíková attended Caronport High School, a private parochial school in Caronport, Saskatchewan, Canada. As a sophomore, she won the Regina League Championship (regional), the Provincial Championship, and the Western Shield with the Caronport women's ice hockey team. She also played with the boys Tier II team in the South Central Minor Hockey League (SCMHL).

=== Bemidji State ===
Tomčíková was playing in the top women's league in Sweden, the Riksserien (renamed SDHL in 2015) before joining the Bemidji State Beavers in 2008. She inherited the starting goaltender position at Bemidji State from Emily Brookshaw, who had set career marks in almost every major goaltending category as a Beaver. As a freshman, she was named to the All-WCHA Second Team and All-WCHA Rookie Team. She played 1805:08 minutes and recorded a .917 save percentage and a 3.09 goals against average, becoming the second Beaver to eclipse the single-season quadruple-save plateau, with 1,025 saves. She tied the school record with three shutouts and became the first player in conference history to be named WCHA Defensive Player of the Week on three straight occasions (10 December, 17 December and 7 January). At season's end, she became the first Beaver to earn All-WCHA Second Team honors. On 28 January 2012, the Wisconsin Badgers hosted a record crowd of 12,402 attended the Kohl Center as Wisconsin swept the Bemidji State Beavers. Tomčíková made 32 saves in front of the record breaking crowd, while her Badgers rival, Alex Rigsby, earned her sixth shutout of the season. After her senior season, she was a member of the four-year class with the most wins in Beaver history, which included with fellow seniors Kimberly Lieder, Alana McElhinney, Montana Vichorek, Marlee Wheelhouse and Lauren Williams.

== International play ==
Tomčíková made her first appearance with the senior Slovak national team at the 2003 Women's Ice Hockey World Championships – Division II, where the 15 year old earned a .958 save percentage and 1.20 goals against average across three games played.

Tomčíková was in net as Canada defeated Slovakia at the 2010 Winter Olympics by an 18–0 mark. She was upset after the match, as she had never allowed so many goals in her career. Tomčíková faced a career-high 67 shots in the game against Canada. In a statement, she said she was really happy her team didn't quit on her and the team was cheering her on after every single goal.

Tomčíková represented Slovakia in the ice hockey tournament at the 2011 Winter Universiade, earning a bronze medal as she made 26 saves in a 3–1 victory over the United States.

Tomčíková represented Slovakia at the 2011 IIHF Women's World Championship. She was named Slovakia's Player of the Game for two games in the tournament, against the United States and Russia. Slovakia's coaches selected her as one of the team's Top Three players for the tournament. Tomčíková played in all five of Slovakia's games during the tournament, facing 250 shots in total, making 237 saves. She finished with a save percentage of 0.948, and a goals against average of 2.56. She had one win, and one shutout. She was named the tournament's Most Valuable Player, and her play was largely responsible for keeping Slovakia in the top division of women's IIHF play.

== Ice hockey career statistics ==
=== Regular season and playoffs ===
			Regular season									Playoffs
Season	Team	League	GP	W	L	T	Min	GA	SO	SV%	GAA	GP	W	L	T	Min	GA	SO	SV%	GAA
2006–07	HC Slovan Bratislava	EWHL	12							.953	1.03	–	–	–	–	–	–	–	–	–
2007–08	Linköping HC	Riksserien	7				419	15	1	.929	2.15	0	0	0	0	0	0	0	0	0
2008–09	Bemidji State Beavers	NCAA	31	5	22	4	1805	93	3	.917	3.09	–	–	–	–	–	–	–	–	–
2009–10	Bemidji State Beavers	NCAA	26	10	11	5	1541	53	5	.938	1.06	–	–	–	–	–	–	–	–	–
2010–11	Bemidji State Beavers	NCAA	28	13	11	3	1632	50	7	.933	1.84	–	–	–	–	–	–	–	–	–
2011–12	Bemidji State Beavers	NCAA	33	13	17	3	1967	73	4	.932	2.23	–	–	–	–	–	–	–	–	–
2013–14	HC Tornado	RWHL	16	12	2	0		20	3		1.35	–	–	–	–	–	–	–	–	–
2014–15	Paneuropa Kings	EUHL	4							.880	3.94	–	–	–	–	–	–	–	–	–
2014–15	HC Petržalka	Extraliga	–	–	–	–	–	–	–	–	–	6							.963	1.61
NCAA totals			118	41	61	15	6945:04	269	19	.929	2.32	–	–	–	–	–	–	–	–	–

Sources: US College Hockey Online, Elite Prospects

=== International ===
Year	Team	Event	Result	GP	W	L	OT	MIN	GA	SO	GAA	SV%
2003	Slovakia	WW D2	3rd	3							1.20	.958
2004	Slovakia	WW D2	3rd	3							2.02	.903
2005	Slovakia	WW D2	3rd	5							1.60	.915
2007	Slovakia	WW D2	1st	5							0.60	.968
2008	Slovakia	WW D1	2nd	5							2.16	.937
2009	Slovakia	OGQ	Q	4	4	0	0	240	1	3	0.25	.990
2009	Slovakia	WW D1	1st	5	4	1	0	300	14	0	2.80	.918
2010	Slovakia	OG	8th	5	0	5	0	300	36	0	7.20	.847
2011	Slovakia	WW	7th	5	1	3	0	305	13	1	2.56	.948
2011	Slovakia	Uni	3rd place, bronze medalist(s)	6							2.54	.912
2012	Slovakia	WW	8th	5	1	4	0	305	14	0	2.76	.953
2013	Slovakia	OGQ	DNQ	3	0	2	0	185	7	1	2.27	.953
2013	Slovakia	WW D1A	3rd	5	3	2	0	299	9	1	1.81	.951

== Awards and honors ==
=== NCAA ===
- 2008–09 All-WCHA Second Team
- WCHA Defensive Player of the Week (Week of 12 October 2009)
- WCHA Defensive Player of the Week (Week of 9 November 2009)
- WCHA Co-Defensive Player of the Week (Week of 20 January 2010)
- 2010 Patty Kazmaier Award nominee
- 2010 Co-WCHA Player of the Year
- 2010 WCHA All-Academic Team
- WCHA Defensive Player of the Week (Week of 5 October 2010)
- WCHA Defensive Player of the Week (Week of 4 October 2011)
- 2011 All-WCHA Second Team
- 2011–12 CCM/ACHC Hockey Women's Division I All-American, Second Team
- 2011–12 Bemidji State Female Student-Athlete of the Year

=== International ice hockey ===
- 2011 IIHF Women's World Championship Media All-Star team
- 2011 IIHF Women's World Championship Most Valuable Player
- 2026 Torriani Award, induction into the IIHF Hall of Fame

=== International ball hockey ===
- 2009 Ball Hockey World Championship All-Star Team
- 2013 Ball Hockey World Championship All-Star Team
- 2017 Ball Hockey World Championship Best Goaltender
