= Ball Hockey World Championship =

International ball hockey competition

ISBHF Ball Hockey World Championship
- Current season, competition or edition: 2026 Ball Hockey World Championship
- Sport: Ball hockey
- Founded: 1996
- Founder: International Street and Ball Hockey Federation
- First season: 1996 (men); 2007 (women)
- No. of teams: 12 (men); 6 (women)
- Most recent champions: United States (men); United States (women) (2026)
- Most titles: Canada (men; 7 titles); Canada (women; 6 titles)

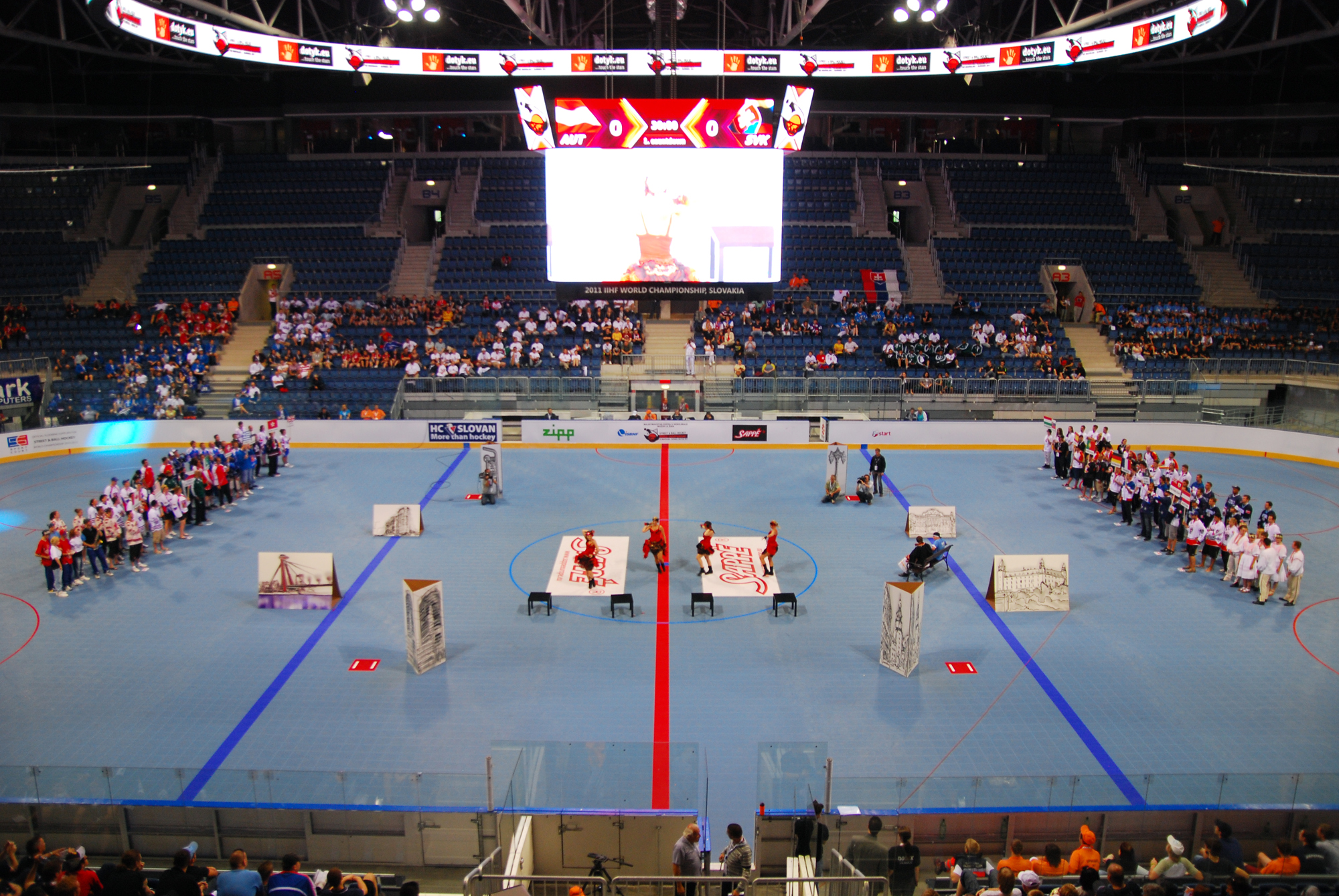
2011 Ball Hockey World Championship

The Ball Hockey World Championship is a biannual ball hockey competition for women's and men's national teams. The first championship was played in 1996 in Bratislava, Slovakia. The Ball Hockey World Championship is organized by International Street and Ball Hockey Federation (ISBHF). The tournament has been played in odd-numbered years since its establishment, other than during 1996 to 1998 and 2022 to 2026, when it was held in even-numbered years. The tournament will return to odd-numbered years in 2027.

The only medallists across the first five men's championships were Canada, the Czech Republic, and Slovakia. The first men's team to win a medal other than those three was Italy in 2005, when they won the bronze medal.

The first women's world championship was contested in 2007 in Ratingen, Germany. Canada were the first women's world champions and the team has won six of the ten championships to date.

== Men ==
Key

| (#) | Number of tournaments won at the time. |

| Year | (gold) Gold | (silver) Silver | (bronze) Bronze | 4th Place | Host city / cities | Host country / countries |
|---|---|---|---|---|---|---|
| 1996 | Canada (1) | Czech Republic (1) | Slovakia (1) | Germany (1) | Bratislava | Slovakia |
| 1998 | Czech Republic (1) | Slovakia (1) | Canada (1) | United States (1) | Litoměřice | Czech Republic |
| 1999 | Slovakia (1) | Canada (1) | Czech Republic (1) | Switzerland (1) | Zvolen | Slovakia |
| 2001 | Canada (2) | Czech Republic (2) | Slovakia (2) | Switzerland (2) | Toronto | Canada |
| 2003 | Canada (3) | Czech Republic (3) | Slovakia (3) | Italy (1) | Sierre | Switzerland |
| 2005 | Canada (4) | Slovakia (2) | Italy (1) | Portugal (1) | Pittsburgh | United States |
| 2007 | Canada (5) | Czech Republic (4) | Slovakia (4) | Italy (2) | Ratingen | Germany |
| 2009 | Czech Republic (2) | India (1) | Slovakia (5) | United States (2) | Plzeň | Czech Republic |
| 2011 | Czech Republic (3) | Canada (2) | Slovakia (6) | United States (3) | Bratislava | Slovakia |
| 2013 | Slovakia (2) | Czech Republic (5) | Canada (2) | Portugal (2) | St.John's | Canada |
| 2015 | Slovakia (3) | United States (1) | Czech Republic (2) | Greece (1) | Zug | Switzerland |
| 2017 | Slovakia (4) | Canada (3) | Czech Republic (3) | Greece (2) | Pardubice | Czech Republic |
| 2019 | Slovakia (5) | Finland (1) | Canada (3) | Czech Republic (1) | Košice | Slovakia |
| 2022 | Canada (6) | Czech Republic (6) | United States (1) | Greece (3) | Laval | Canada |
| 2024 | Canada (7) | Czech Republic (7) | United States (2) | Switzerland (3) | Visp | Switzerland |
| 2026 | United States (1) | Czech Republic (8) | Finland (1) | Canada (1) | Ostrava | Czech Republic |
| 2027 | | | | | Poprad | Slovakia |

=== Medal table ===
As of 2026

| Rank | Nation | Gold | Silver | Bronze | Total |
|---|---|---|---|---|---|
| 1 | Canada | 7 | 3 | 3 | 13 |
| 2 | Slovakia | 5 | 2 | 6 | 13 |
| 3 | Czech Republic | 3 | 8 | 3 | 14 |
| 4 | United States | 1 | 1 | 2 | 4 |
| 5 | Finland | 0 | 1 | 1 | 2 |
| 6 | India | 0 | 1 | 0 | 1 |
| 7 | Italy | 0 | 0 | 1 | 1 |
| Totals (7 entries) | | 16 | 16 | 16 | 48 |

=== Participation details ===
| Team | (Slovakia) 1996 | (Czech Republic) 1998 | (Slovakia) 1999 | (Canada) 2001 | (Switzerland) 2003 | (United States) 2005 | (Germany) 2007 | (Czech Republic) 2009 | (Slovakia) 2011 | (Canada) 2013 | (Switzerland) 2015 | (Czech Republic) 2017 | (Slovakia) 2019 | (Canada) 2022 | (Switzerland) 2024 | (Czech Republic) 2026 | Total |
|---|---|---|---|---|---|---|---|---|---|---|---|---|---|---|---|---|---|
| Armenia | - | - | - | - | - | - | - | - | - | 17th | 18th | 15th | 15th | 12th | 16th | - | 6 |
| Austria | 5th | 5th | 6th | 7th | 10th | 15th | 12th | 10th | 9th | - | - | - | - | - | - | 10th | 10 |
| Bermuda | - | - | - | 5th | 9th | 13th | 13th | 8th | 13th | 11th | 11th | 18th | 14th | 9th | 15th | - | 12 |
| Canada | 1st | 3rd | 2nd | 1st | 1st | 1st | 1st | 5th | 2nd | 3rd | 5th | 2nd | 3rd | 1st | 1st | 4th | 16 |
| Cayman Islands | - | - | - | - | - | 14th | 14th | 16th | 15th | 14th | 14th | 16th | 9th | 16th | 13th | 11th | 11 |
| Czech Republic | 2nd | 1st | 3rd | 2nd | 2nd | 5th | 2nd | 1st | 1st | 2nd | 3rd | 3rd | 4th | 2nd | 2nd | 2nd | 16 |
| Finland | - | - | - | - | - | - | - | 13th | 7th | - | 8th | 9th | 2nd | 7th | 7th | 3rd | 8 |
| France | - | - | - | - | - | - | - | - | 12th | 10th | 16th | 11th | - | 13th | 14th | 8th | 7 |
| Germany | 4th | 6th | 5th | 6th | 7th | 10th | 11th | - | 8th | 8th | - | - | - | - | - | 12th | 10 |
| (United Kingdom) Great Britain | - | - | - | - | - | 7th | 8th | 15th | 14th | 16th | 15th | 14th | 10th | 11th | 12th | 9th | 11 |
| Greece | - | - | - | - | - | 11th | 15th | 9th | 6th | 6th | 4th | 4th | 8th | 4th | 6th | - | 10 |
| Haiti | - | - | - | - | - | - | - | - | - | - | 13th | 12th | 12th | 8th | 8th | - | 5 |
| (Hong Kong) Hong Kong | - | - | - | - | - | - | - | 12th | 16th | 13th | 17th | 13th | 11th | 14th | - | - | 7 |
| Hungary | - | 8th | 7th | - | - | - | - | - | 18th | - | - | - | - | - | - | - | 3 |
| Italy | - | - | - | - | 4th | 3rd | 4th | 7th | - | 12th | 10th | 10th | 5th | 6th | 9th | - | 10 |
| India | - | - | - | - | - | 6th | 7th | 2nd | - | - | 9th | 8th | - | - | - | 7th | 6 |
| Israel | - | - | - | - | - | - | - | - | - | 15th | - | - | - | - | - | - | 1 |
| Latvia | - | - | - | - | 11th | - | - | - | - | - | - | - | - | - | - | - | 1 |
| Lebanon | - | - | - | - | - | - | - | - | - | - | - | 17th | 13th | 10th | 10th | - | 4 |
| Pakistan | - | - | - | - | 6th | 12th | 9th | 14th | 11th | 9th | 12th | - | - | 15th | - | - | 8 |
| Portugal | - | - | - | - | - | 4th | 5th | 6th | 5th | 4th | 7th | 6th | - | - | 11th | - | 8 |
| Russia | 6th | - | - | - | - | - | - | - | - | - | - | - | - | - | - | - | 1 |
| Slovakia | 3rd | 2nd | 1st | 3rd | 3rd | 2nd | 3rd | 3rd | 3rd | 1st | 1st | 1st | 1st | 5th | 5th | 6th | 16 |
| Spain | - | - | - | - | - | - | - | - | 17th | - | - | - | - | - | - | - | 1 |
| Switzerland | 7th | 7th | 4th | 4th | 5th | 8th | 6th | 11th | 10th | 7th | 6th | 7th | 6th | - | 4th | 5th | 15 |
| United States | - | 4th | - | 8th | 8th | 9th | 10th | 4th | 4th | 5th | 2nd | 5th | 7th | 3rd | 3rd | 1st | 14 |

== Women ==
=== Championship history ===
| Year | (gold) Gold | (silver) Silver | (bronze) Bronze | 4th place | Host city / cities | Host nation |
|---|---|---|---|---|---|---|
| 2007 | Canada (1) | Slovakia | Czech Republic | United States | Ratingen | Germany |
| 2009 | Canada (2) | Slovakia | Czech Republic | United States | Plzeň | Czech Republic |
| 2011 | Slovakia (1) | Canada | Czech Republic | United States | Bratislava | Slovakia |
| 2013 | Canada (3) | Slovakia | Czech Republic | United States | St. John's | Canada |
| 2015 | Canada (4) | Czech Republic | Slovakia | United States | Zug | Switzerland |
| 2017 | Czech Republic (1) | United States | Canada | Slovakia | Pardubice | Czech Republic |
| 2019 | Canada (5) | United States | Czech Republic | Slovakia | Košice | Slovakia |
| 2022 | Canada (6) | Czech Republic | Slovakia | United States | Laval | Canada |
| 2024 | United States (1) | Czech Republic | Canada | Slovakia | Visp & Raron | Switzerland |
| 2026 | United States (2) | Czech Republic | Canada | Slovakia | Ostrava | Czech Republic |
| 2027 | | | | | Poprad | Slovakia |

=== Medal table ===
As of July 2026

| Rank | Nation | Gold | Silver | Bronze | Total |
|---|---|---|---|---|---|
| 1 | Canada | 6 | 1 | 3 | 10 |
| 2 | United States | 2 | 2 | 0 | 4 |
| 3 | Czech Republic | 1 | 4 | 5 | 10 |
| 4 | Slovakia | 1 | 3 | 2 | 6 |
| Totals (4 entries) | | 10 | 10 | 10 | 30 |

=== Participation details ===
| Team | (Germany) 2007 | (Czech Republic) 2009 | (Slovakia) 2011 | (Canada) 2013 | (Switzerland) 2015 | (Czech Republic) 2017 | (Slovakia) 2019 | (Canada) 2022 | (Switzerland) 2024 | (Czech Republic) 2026 | Total |
|---|---|---|---|---|---|---|---|---|---|---|---|
| Austria | 6th | 6th | 6th | - | - | - | - | - | - | – | 3 |
| Canada | 1st | 1st | 2nd | 1st | 1st | 3rd | 1st | 1st | 3rd | 3rd | 10 |
| Czech Republic | 3rd | 3rd | 3rd | 3rd | 2nd | 1st | 3rd | 2nd | 2nd | 2nd | 10 |
| Germany | 5th | - | - | - | - | - | - | - | - | – | 1 |
| (United Kingdom) Great Britain | - | - | 8th | 7th | 7th | 6th | 5th | 5th | 5th | 5th | 8 |
| Greece | - | 7th | 9th | 8th | - | - | - | - | - | – | 3 |
| Hungary | – | - | 7th | - | - | - | - | - | - | – | 1 |
| Italy | - | - | - | 6th | 6th | 5th | - | - | - | – | 3 |
| Lebanon | - | - | - | - | - | - | - | 6th | - | – | 1 |
| Slovakia | 2nd | 2nd | 1st | 2nd | 3rd | 4th | 4th | 3rd | 4th | 4th | 10 |
| Switzerland | - | 5th | 5th | 5th | 5th | - | - | - | 7th | 6th | 6 |
| United Nations | - | - | - | - | - | - | - | – | 6th | – | 1 |
| United States | 4th | 4th | 4th | 4th | 4th | 2nd | 2nd | 4th | 1st | 1st | 10 |
