= Czech Republic men's national ball hockey team =

Czech Republic
- Association: Českomoravský svaz hokejbalu (ČMSHb)
- Head coach: David Kuna

Biggest win
- Czech Republic 20–0 France (St. John's, Canada 13 June 2013)

Biggest defeat
- Canada 6–1 Czech Republic (Sierre, Switzerland 2003)

Ball Hockey World Championship
- Appearances: 15 (first in 1996)
- Best result: 1st (1998, 2009, 2011)

Czech Republic men's national ball hockey team
Medal record

World Championships
Gold medal – first place	1998 Czech Republic	Team
Gold medal – first place	2009 Czech Republic	Team
Gold medal – first place	2011 Slovakia	Team
Silver medal – second place	1996 Slovakia	Team
Silver medal – second place	2001 Canada	Team
Silver medal – second place	2003 Switzerland	Team
Silver medal – second place	2007 Germany	Team
Silver medal – second place	2013 Canada	Team
Silver medal – second place	2022 Canada	Team
Silver medal – second place	2024 Switzerland	Team
Silver medal – second place	2026 Czech Republic	Team
Bronze medal – third place	1999 Slovakia	Team
Bronze medal – third place	2015 Switzerland	Team
Bronze medal – third place	2017 Czech Republic	Team

The Czech Republic men's national ball hockey team is the men's national ball hockey team of the Czech Republic, and a member of the International Street and Ball Hockey Federation (ISBHF). With three World Championship titles, the side is among the most successful national teams in men's ball hockey.

== History ==
The side was among the most dominant nations at the first five World Championships, reaching four finals, winning three silver medals, as well as gold at the 1998 tournament held in the Czech town of Litoměřice, triumphing over neighbours Slovakia in the final by three goals to one. On the occasion when they failed to reach the final, they won bronze in 1999, winning an uneven contest 7–1 against Switzerland. They won their second title in 2009, going unbeaten for the whole tournament, which was held in the Czech city of Plzeň, defeating India in overtime in the final. The 2011 World Championship in Slovakia saw the Czech Republic defend their 2009 title, winning their third gold and eighth medal overall, as they defeated Canada 3–1 in the final. Having won the first two World Championships held within domestic borders, the side hosted a third tournament in 2017, in the city of Pardubice. After an unsuccessful semi-final against Slovakia, the side beat Greece for the bronze medal, repeating their result from the previous championship. After missing out on a medal in 2019, the side reached a world championship final for the first time since 2013 at the 2022 tournament in Laval. However, after losing to host nation Canada by a 6–3 scoreline, the Czech Republic took home a silver medal, their sixth silver and 12th overall. The Czech Republic team again reached the final in the 2024 tournament in Switzerland, but again lost against Canada, with the game being decided after double overtime, 4–3 in Canada's favour.

== World Championships ==
Year	Location	Result
1996	Bratislava, Slovakia	Silver
1998	Litoměřice, Czech Republic	Gold
1999	Zvolen, Slovakia	Bronze
2001	Toronto, Canada	Silver
2003	Sierre, Switzerland	Silver
2005	Pittsburgh, United States	5th place
2007	Ratingen, Germany	Silver
2009	Plzeň, Czech Republic	Gold
2011	Bratislava, Slovakia	Gold
2013	St. John's, Canada	Silver
2015	Zug, Switzerland	Bronze
2017	Pardubice, Czech Republic	Bronze
2019	Košice, Slovakia	4th place
2022	Laval, Canada	Silver
2024	Visp, Switzerland	Silver
2026	Ostrava, Czech Republic	Silver
