= Lebanon men's national ball hockey team =

Lebanon
- Association: Lebanese Hockey Association
- Captain: Bassil Boulos
- Most points: Alexandre Haddad (10)
- Team colors

First international
- (United Kingdom) Great Britain 2–1 Lebanon (Pardubice, Czech Republic; 2 June 2017)

Biggest win
- Lebanon 6–1 Bermuda (Pardubice, Czech Republic; 8 June 2017)

Biggest defeat
- France 9–4 Lebanon (Pardubice, Czech Republic; 4 June 2017); Hong Kong 5–0 Lebanon (Pardubice, Czech Republic; 6 June 2017)

Ball Hockey World Championship
- Appearances: 1 (first in 2017)
- Best result: 17th (2017)

International record (W–L–T)
- 2–5–0

The Lebanese national ball hockey team (French: Équipe du Liban de hockey-balle) is the national ball hockey team of Lebanon. The team is controlled by the Lebanese Hockey Association and a member of the International Street and Ball Hockey Federation (ISBHF).

== History ==
The Lebanese Hockey Association (French: Association de Hockey Libanaise) has been created to advance ice, inline and ball hockey initiatives of Lebanese hockey players on a worldwide basis in addition to enabling international development and representation of the country in the sport of hockey.

Lebanon will make its Ball Hockey World Championship (BHWC) debut at the 2017 Ball Hockey World Championship in Pardubice, Czech Republic. The team played its first game on 2 June 2017, but a narrow 2–1 loss against Great Britain, then later lost 3–2 to Bermuda in their second game on 3 June 2017.

== World Championship ==
Year	Location	Result
2017	Pardubice, Czech Republic	17th place

== Roster ==
The following 25 players have been selected for the 2017 Ball Hockey World Championship.

#	Name	Pos	S/C	Height	Weight	Date of birth
7	Jean Awad	D	R	1.65 m (5 ft 5 in)	109 kg (240 lb)	28 December 1989 (aged 27)
8	Elie Salhany	F	R	1.75 m (5 ft 9 in)	91 kg (201 lb)	2 November 1994 (aged 22)
9	Michael Habib	F	L	1.83 m (6 ft 0 in)	79 kg (174 lb)	19 June 1979 (aged 37)
10	Dominique Nehmé	D	R	1.91 m (6 ft 3 in)	100 kg (220 lb)	17 September 1981 (aged 35)
11	Jad Boulos	D	L	1.78 m (5 ft 10 in)	104 kg (229 lb)	10 August 1982 (aged 34)
13	Patrick Haber	F	L	1.70 m (5 ft 7 in)	59 kg (130 lb)	13 June 1994 (aged 22)
16	Noel Feghali	D	R	1.91 m (6 ft 3 in)	95 kg (209 lb)	16 January 1983 (aged 34)
17	Ricardo Abdulahad	F	R	1.78 m (5 ft 10 in)	66 kg (146 lb)	1 October 1996 (aged 20)
18	Mark Anthony Haber	F	R	1.73 m (5 ft 8 in)	68 kg (150 lb)	26 February 1997 (aged 20)
21	Michael Boutros	F	R	1.67 m (5 ft 5 1/2 in)	77 kg (170 lb)	24 December 1982 (aged 34)
23	Ralph Younes	D	R	1.73 m (5 ft 8 in)	86 kg (190 lb)	26 December 1984 (aged 32)
29	Pascal Malkoun	G	L	1.85 m (6 ft 1 in)	82 kg (181 lb)	11 February 1982 (aged 35)
33	Pierre Habib	G	L	1.80 m (5 ft 11 in)	77 kg (170 lb)	6 November 1975 (aged 41)
43	Nasser Fadl	F	L	1.85 m (6 ft 1 in)	80 kg (180 lb)	17 October 1989 (aged 27)
44	Charly Nasrallah	D	R	1.80 m (5 ft 11 in)	78 kg (172 lb)	30 July 1980 (aged 36)
47	Anthony El-Haddad	F	L	1.70 m (5 ft 7 in)	82 kg (181 lb)	7 April 1990 (aged 27)
48	Elie-Joe Skaff	G	L	1.78 m (5 ft 10 in)	95 kg (209 lb)	25 April 1991 (aged 26)
60	Barakat Mohamad	F	R	1.80 m (5 ft 11 in)	85 kg (187 lb)	2 August 1983 (aged 33)
68	Alexandre Haddad	F	L	1.63 m (5 ft 4 in)	63 kg (139 lb)	16 October 1992 (aged 24)
77	Wajih Abboud	D	L	1.80 m (5 ft 11 in)	89 kg (196 lb)	10 February 1982 (aged 35)
83	Julio Eid	D	R	1.85 m (6 ft 1 in)	91 kg (201 lb)	30 July 1983 (aged 33)
87	Antoine Ziadé	F	L	1.70 m (5 ft 7 in)	82 kg (181 lb)	9 December 1982 (aged 34)
88	Elie Sabeh	F	L	1.70 m (5 ft 7 in)	82 kg (181 lb)	14 August 1988 (aged 28)
90	Bassil Boulos	F	L	1.80 m (5 ft 11 in)	88 kg (194 lb)	8 August 1990 (aged 26)
97	Ali Sayed	F	L	1.83 m (6 ft 0 in)	98 kg (216 lb)	4 August 1988 (aged 28)

== All-time World Championship record ==
Year	Pld	W	T	L	GF	GA	Diff
2017	7	2	0	5	18	27	–9

== See also ==
- Lebanon men's national ice hockey team
