= Armenia men's national ball hockey team =

Armenia
- Nickname: Armenia
- Association: International Armenian Ball Hockey Association (IABHA)
- Head coach: Gabi Missakian
- Top scorer: 91
- Most points: 91
- Team colors: black white red blue orange

Biggest win
- Armenia 6 - 3 versus Cayman Islands for Bronze medal 2017 pardubice.

Biggest defeat
- Haiti 6 - 0 Armenia (Zug, Canada June 21, 2015)

Ball Hockey World Championship
- Appearances: 6 (first in 2013)
- Best result: 12th (2022)

International record (W–L–T)
- 4-3 in 2017

The Armenia national ball hockey team has been representing Armenia in the Ball Hockey World Championship since 2013. It is member of the International Street and Ball Hockey Federation (ISBHF).

== World Championship ==
Year	Location	Result
2013	St.John's, Canada	17th place
2015	Zug, Switzerland	18th place
2017	Pardubice, Czech Republic	15th place
2019	Košice, Slovakia	15th place
2022	Laval, Canada	12th place
2024	Visp, Switzerland	16th place

== See also ==
- Ball hockey
- Sport in Armenia
