= Denisa Křížová =

Czech ice and ball hockey player

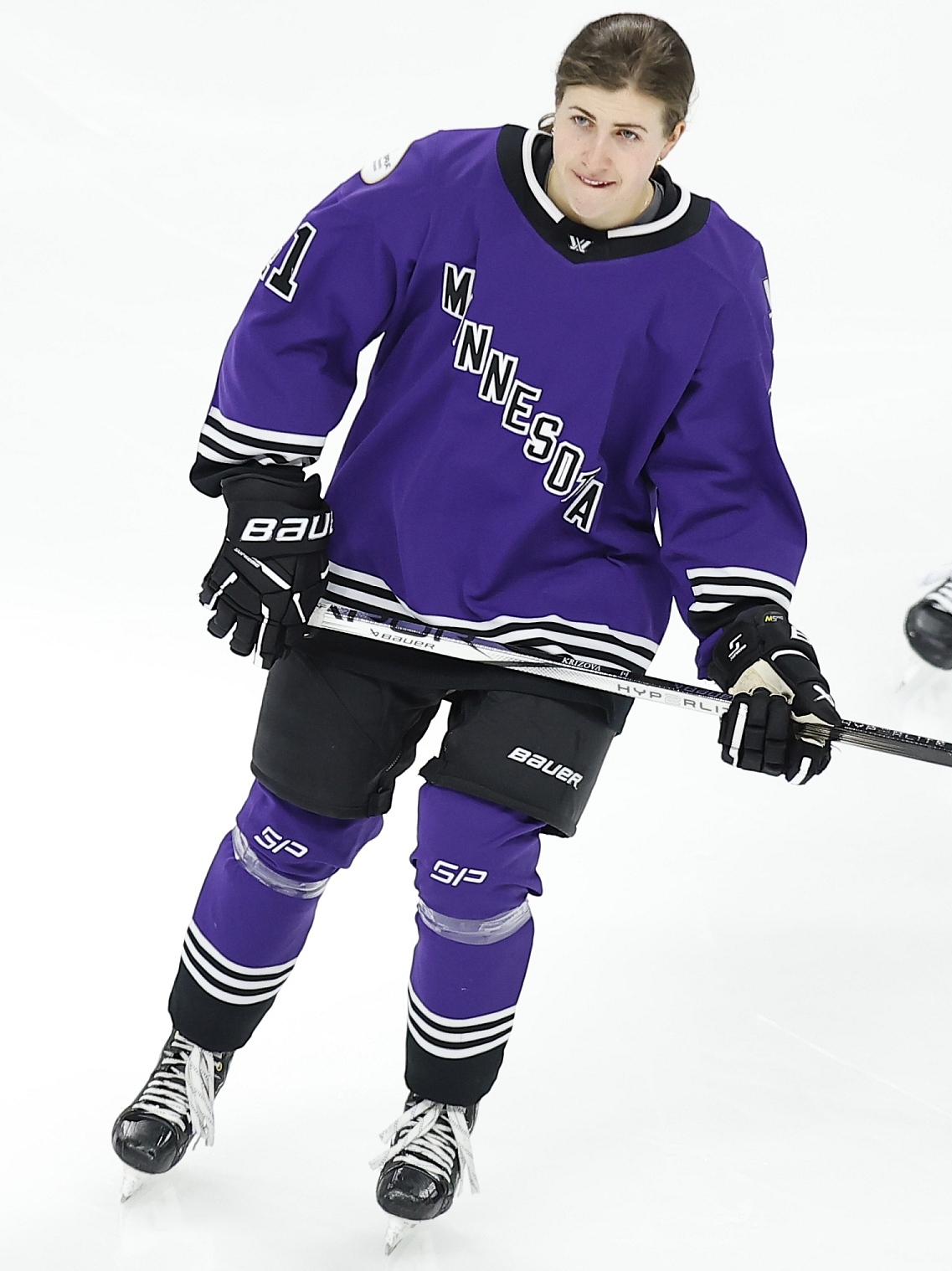
- Křížová with PWHL Minnesota in 2024
- Born: 3 November 1994 (age 31) Horní Cerekev, Czech Republic
- Height: 165 cm (5 ft 5 in)
- Weight: 62 kg (137 lb; 9 st 11 lb)
- Position: Forward
- Shoots: Left
- PWHL team Former teams: New York Sirens; Minnesota Frost; Minnesota Whitecaps; Brynäs IF Dam; Boston Pride; HC Slavia Praha
- National team: Czech Republic
- Playing career: 2011–present
Medal record
Women's ice hockey
IIHF World Championship
Bronze medal – third place	2022 Denmark
Bronze medal – third place	2023 Canada
Women's ball hockey
ISBHF World Championship
Gold medal – first place	2017 Czech Republic
Silver medal – second place	2022 Canada
Bronze medal – third place	2011 Slovakia
Bronze medal – third place	2013 Canada
Bronze medal – third place	2015 Switzerland
Bronze medal – third place	2019 Slovakia

Denisa Křížová (born 3 November 1994) is a Czech ice hockey player who is a forward for the New York Sirens of the Professional Women's Hockey League (PWHL) and a member of the Czech Republic women's national ice hockey team.

== Ice hockey career ==
Across four years of college ice hockey with the Northeastern Huskies women's ice hockey program, Křížová put up 169 points in 143 games, the sixth-highest scorer in the university's history.

Křížová became the first player born in the Czech Republic to be drafted into the National Women's Hockey League (NWHL; renamed PHF in 2021) when the Connecticut Whale selected her with the thirteenth pick overall in the 2017 NWHL Draft. She signed her first professional contract with the Boston Pride on 2 August 2018.

After only one year with the Pride, she returned to Europe to play with Brynäs IF Dam in the Swedish Women's Hockey League (SDHL). She scored 47 points in 34 games in her first season with the team, good for seventh in league scoring.

Křížová returned to the PHF in 2022 to play one season with the Minnesota Whitecaps.

She was drafted in the eighth round of the 2023 PWHL Draft by PWHL Minnesota. During the 2023–24 season, she recorded three goals and three assists in 24 regular season games. During the playoffs she recorded two goals in ten games, and helped Minnesota win the inaugural Walter Cup. On 21 June 2024, Minnesota re-signed Křížová to a one-year contract for the 2024–25 season.

On 9 June 2025, Křížová was drafted 12th overall by the Vancouver Goldeneyes in the 2025 PWHL Expansion Draft. On 19 November 2025, Křížová returned to the Minnesota Frost in a trade for Frost third-round pick Anna Segedi. During the 2025–26 season, she recorded one goal and four assists in 23 games with the Frost. On 30 March 2026, she was traded to the New York Sirens in exchange for Jincy Roese. On 20 June 2026, she signed a one-year contract extension with the Sirens.

== International play ==
As a junior player with the Czech national under-18 team, Křížová participated in IIHF U18 Women's World Championships in 2010, 2011 and 2012.

With the senior national team, she represented the Czech Republic in the women's ice hockey tournament at the 2022 Winter Olympics in Beijing and at the IIHF World Women's Championship Top Division tournaments in 2013, 2016, 2017, 2019, and 2021; the Division I Group A tournaments in 2012, 2014, and 2015; and the Division II tournament in 2011.

== Ball hockey career ==
Křížová is also an elite ball hockey player and has represented the Czech Republic at the Ball Hockey World Championship for more than a decade, winning a gold medal in 2017, silver in 2022, and bronze medals in 2011, 2013, 2015, and 2019. She was named Best Forward of the tournament in 2017 and was selected to the All Star team in 2019 after leading all players in scoring.

== Career statistics ==
=== Regular season and playoffs ===
Note: GP = Games played; G = Goals; A = Assists; Pts = Points; PIM = Penalty minutes;

			Regular season					Playoffs
Season	Team	League	GP	G	A	Pts	PIM	GP	G	A	Pts	PIM
2014–15	Northeastern University	HE	33	13	22	35	14	—	—	—	—	—
2015–16	Northeastern University	HE	37	20	39	59	22	—	—	—	—	—
2016–17	Northeastern University	HE	33	13	22	35	14	—	—	—	—	—
2017–18	Northeastern University	HE	37	20	39	59	22	—	—	—	—	—
2018–19	Boston Pride	NWHL	16	6	8	14	4	1	0	0	0	0
2019–20	Brynäs IF	SDHL	34	20	27	47	24	5	0	3	3	2
2020–21	Brynäs IF	SDHL	36	16	21	37	22	8	6	0	6	12
2021–22	Brynäs IF	SDHL	36	20	24	44	18	10	7	4	11	4
2022–23	Minnesota Whitecaps	PHF	24	5	4	9	8	3	0	2	2	2
2023–24	PWHL Minnesota	PWHL	24	3	3	6	8	10	2	0	2	6
2024–25	Minnesota Frost	PWHL	30	4	5	9	12	8	0	0	0	0
2025–26	New York Sirens	PWHL	7	1	1	2	4	—	—	—	—	—
NWHL/PHF totals			40	11	12	23	12	4	0	2	2	2
SDHL totals			106	56	72	128	64	23	13	7	20	18
PWHL totals			61	8	9	17	24	18	2	0	2	6

=== International ===
Year	Team	Event	Result	GP	G	A	Pts	PIM
2010	Czechia	U18	7th	5	5	1	6	6
2011	Czechia	U18	4th	6	1	2	3	2
2011	Czechia	WC D2	1st	4	1	2	3	0
2012	Czechia	U18	6th	5	0	3	3	6
2012	Czechia	WC D1A	1st	5	2	0	2	0
2013	Czechia	OGQ	DNQ	3	1	1	2	4
2013	Czechia	WC	8th	5	1	1	2	0
2014	Czechia	WC D1A	1st	5	2	2	4	4
2014	Czechia	WWQ	DNQ	3	1	0	1	2
2015	Czechia	WC D1A	1st	5	3	2	5	4
2016	Czechia	WC	6th	5	0	5	5	4
2017	Czechia	OGQ	DNQ	3	2	2	4	0
2017	Czechia	WC	8th	6	0	0	0	2
2019	Czechia	WC	6th	5	2	1	3	4
2021	Czechia	WC	7th	6	1	3	4	4
2021	Czechia	OGQ	Q	3	1	2	3	2
2022	Czechia	OG	7th	5	2	2	4	2
2022	Czechia	WC	3rd place, bronze medalist(s)	7	0	4	4	0
2023	Czechia	WC	3rd place, bronze medalist(s)	7	3	2	5	4
2024	Czechia	WC	4th	7	1	1	2	29
2025	Czechia	WC	4th	7	1	2	3	2
2026	Czechia	OG	5th	5	0	0	0	0
Junior totals				16	6	6	12	14
Senior totals				96	24	32	56	67

== Awards and honors ==
- 2017 Ball Hockey World Championship Best Forward
- 2019 Ball Hockey World Championship Scoring Champion
- 2019 Ball Hockey World Championship Tournament All-Star Team
- 2023 Premier Hockey Federation Foundation Award
- 2024 Walter Cup Champion
- 2025 Walter Cup Champion
