= Great Britain men's national ball hockey team =

Great Britain
- Nickname: Great Britain
- Association: Ball Hockey UK
- Head coach: Stuart Wilson
- Captain: Carl Graham

Biggest win
- (United Kingdom) Great Britain 9 - 3 Greece (Pittsburgh, United States June, 2005)

Biggest defeat
- (United Kingdom) Great Britain 1 - 21 Canada (Plzeň, Czech Republic June, 2009)

Ball Hockey World Championship
- Appearances: 10 (first in 2005)
- Best result: 7th (2005)

The Great Britain men's national ball hockey team is the men's national ball hockey team of Great Britain, and a member of the International Street and Ball Hockey Federation (ISBHF).

== World Championships ==
Year	Location	Result
2005	Pittsburgh, USA	7th place
2007	Ratingen, Germany	8th place
2009	Plzeň, Czech Republic	15th place
2011	Bratislava, Slovakia	14th place
2013	St.John's, Canada	16th place
2015	Zug, Switzerland	15th place
2017	Pardubice, Czech Republic	14th place
2019	Košice, Slovakia	10th place
2022	Laval, Canada	10th place
2024	Visp, Switzerland	12th place
