= Austria men's national ball hockey team =

Austria
- Nickname: Austria
- Association: Österreichischer Ball Hockey Verband (ÖBHV)

Biggest win
- Austria 11 - 0 Mexico (Pittsburgh, United States, 2005)

Biggest defeat
- Canada 16 - 0 Austria (Bratislava, Slovakia, 1996)

Ball Hockey World Championship
- Appearances: 9 (first in 1996)
- Best result: 5th (1996, 1998)

The Austria national ball hockey team has been representing Austria in the Ball Hockey World Championship since 1995. Is member of the International Street and Ball Hockey Federation (ISBHF).

== World Championship ==
Year	Location	Result
1996	Bratislava, Slovakia	5th place
1998	Litoměřice, Czech Republic	5th place
1999	Zvolen, Slovakia	6th place
2001	Toronto, Canada	7th place
2003	Sierre, Switzerland	10th place
2005	Pittsburgh, United States	15th place
2007	Ratingen, Germany	12th place
2009	Plzeň, Czech Republic	10th place
2011	Bratislava, Slovakia	9th place
