= 2009 Ball Hockey World Championship =

Tournament details
- Host country: Czech Republic
- Venue: 1 (in 1 host city)
- Teams: 16

Final positions
- Champions: Czech Republic (2nd title)
- Runners-up: India
- Third place: Slovakia

The 2009 Ball Hockey World Championship was the eighth ball hockey world championship held by ISBHF in Plzeň, Czech Republic. The Czech Republic won their second title, going unbeaten for the whole tournament and defeating India in overtime in the final.

== Group stage ==
=== Division A ===
==== Group A ====
Team	Pld	W	D	L	GF	GA	GD	Pts
Czech Republic	3	3	0	0	10	2	+8	7
India	3	2	0	1	12	6	+6	4
Slovakia	3	1	0	2	8	6	+2	2
Switzerland	3	0	0	3	0	16	−16	0

Source: iDNES.cz

Czech Republic	5–0 (1:0, 1:0, 3:0)	Switzerland	Attendance: 3894

Petr Novák – 12:38	1–0
Milan Sýkora – 23:22	2–0
Jan Bacovský – 30:15	3–0
Ondřej Kejř – 39:43	4–0
Petr Novák – 41:00	5–0

43
Shots
6

India	4–3 (0:1, 1:1, 2:2)	Slovakia	Attendance: 770

Dampy Brar – 12:12	1–0
	1–1	23:18 – Patrik Svitana
Sharny Kaila – 29:17	2–1
Harpreet Kalkat – 30:21	3–1
	3–2	39:08 – Peter Toth
	3–3	42:09 – Peter Škvaridlo
Boris Mostaghim – 44:41	4–3

15
Shots
33

Czech Republic	3–2 (1:0, 1:0, 1:2)	India	Attendance: 2025

Petr Novák – 13:00	1–0
Jan Pospíšil – 23:10	2–0
	2–1	35:19 – Sharny Kaila
	2–2	38:28 – Boris Mostaghim
Jan Pospíšil – 44:07	3–2

35
Shots
21

Slovakia	5–0 (0:0, 4:0, 1:0)	Switzerland	Attendance: 515

Tomáš Škvaridlo – 19:36	1–0
Tibor Kapánek – 20:05	2–0
Tomáš Škvaridlo – 22:04	3–0
Richard Pobeha – 25:59	4–0
Marek Dubec – 44:53	5–0

36
Shots
7

India	6–0 (2:0, 2:0, 2:0)	Switzerland	Attendance: 305

Sharny Kaila – 05:20	1–0
Simren Sandhu – 06:19	2–0
Ricky Dusanj – 17:02	3–0
Boris Mostaghim – 26:24	4–0
Sharny Kaila – 39:50	5–0
Harpreet Kalkat – 44:14	6–0

31
Shots
17

Czech Republic	2–0 (0:0, 0:0, 2:0)	Slovakia	Attendance: 4816

Petr Novák – 32:22 / 1–0; Jan Bacovský – 39:07 / 2–0
24	Shots	19

==== Group B ====
Team	Pld	W	D	L	GF	GA	GD	Pts
Canada	3	3	0	0	31	4	+27	7
Portugal	3	1	1	1	14	6	+8	4
Italy	3	1	1	1	11	8	+3	2
(United Kingdom) Great Britain	3	0	0	3	3	41	−38	0

Source: iDNES.cz

Portugal	2–0	Italy

Canada	21–1	(United Kingdom) Great Britain

Canada	5–3	Portugal

Italy	11–1	(United Kingdom) Great Britain

Portugal	9–1	(United Kingdom) Great Britain

Canada	5–0	Italy

=== Division B ===
==== Group C ====
Team	Pld	W	D	L	GF	GA	GD	Pts
Bermuda	3	2	0	1	12	9	+3	4
Finland	3	1	1	1	8	8	0	3
Pakistan	3	1	1	1	6	5	+1	3
Cayman Islands	3	1	0	2	7	11	−4	2

Source: iDNES.cz

Pakistan	3–1	Cayman Islands

Bermuda	4–4	Finland

Bermuda	6–3	Cayman Islands

Finland	2–1	Pakistan

Cayman Islands	3–2	Finland

Bermuda	2–2	Pakistan

==== Group D ====
Team	Pld	W	D	L	GF	GA	GD	Pts
United States	3	2	0	1	28	5	+23	7
Greece	3	1	1	1	19	8	+11	4
Austria	3	1	1	1	13	16	−3	2
Hong Kong	3	1	0	2	3	34	−31	0

Source: iDNES.cz

United States	4–2 (1:0, 1:2, 2:0)	Greece	Attendance: 120

Matt Leveseque – 14:51	1–0
	1–1	18:07 – Greg Maleganeas
Matt Leveseque – 22:20	2–1
	2–2	27:04 – George Vouloumanos
Chris Housser – 32:08	3–2
Ozzy Allen – 37:19	4–2

40
Shots
26

Austria	8–1 (4:0, 2:0, 2:1)	Hong Kong	Attendance: 177

Austria	4–4	Greece

United States	13–2	Hong Kong

Greece	13–0	Hong Kong

United States	11–1	Austria

== Play Off ==
Eighth-finals
Bermuda	10
(United Kingdom) Great Britain	0
Slovakia	10
Greece	1
Italy	6
Finland	1
Switzerland	1
United States	4

Quarterfinals
Czech Republic	12
Bermuda	0
Portugal	1
Slovakia	3
India	3
Italy	2
Canada	5
United States	6

Semifinals
Czech Republic	5
Slovakia	4
India	5
United States	4

Gold medal game
Czech Republic	4
India	3
Bronze medal game
Slovakia	5
United States	2

=== Eighth-finals ===
Team 1	Score	Team 2
Great Britain (United Kingdom)	0–10	Bermuda
Italy	6–1	Finland
Slovakia	10–1	Greece
Switzerland	1–4	United States

=== Quarter-finals ===
Team 1	Score	Team 2
Czech Republic	12–0	Bermuda
India	3–2	Italy
Portugal	1–3	Slovakia
Canada	5–6 (OT)	United States

=== Semi-finals ===
Team 1	Score	Team 2
Czech Republic	5–4 (OT)	Slovakia
India	5–4	United States

=== Third place match ===
Team 1	Score	Team 2
Slovakia	5–2	United States

=== Final ===
Team 1	Score	Team 2
Czech Republic	4–3 (OT)	India
