= Jeju Cup =

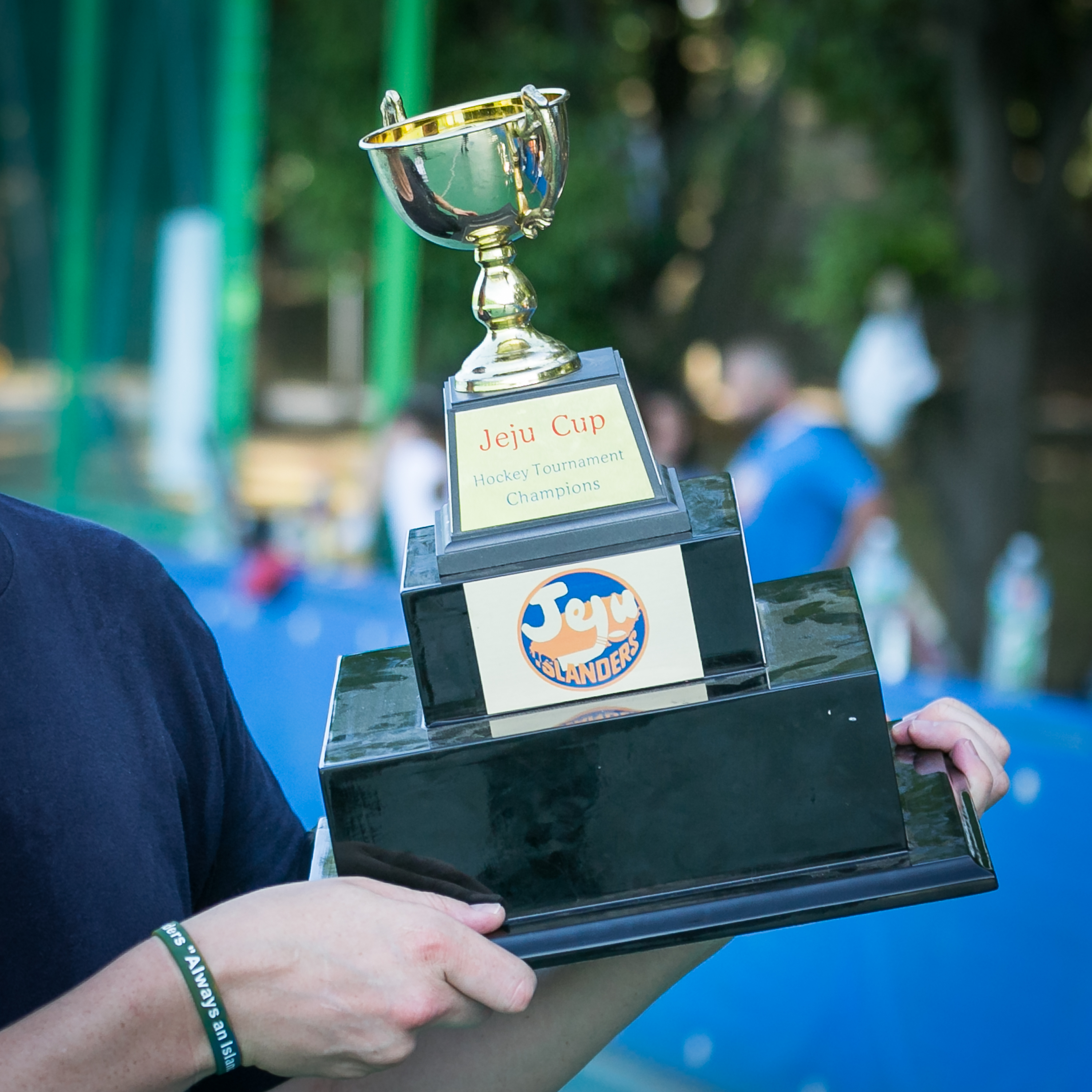

The Jeju Cup is the championship trophy awarded biannually to the winning team of the Jeju Cup Summer Classic and Jeju Cup Winter Classic ball hockey tournaments on Jeju Island, South Korea. Both tournaments are hosted by the Jeju Islanders Hockey Club, and played at the Jeju City inline skating rink.

Every time the trophy is won, a new plate is added, engraved with each player's name from the winning team. The trophy began with only one tier below the cup, but two additional tiers were added in July 2016 to accommodate more championship plates.

The Jeju Cup was first awarded to the Jungmun Jets at the inaugural Summer Classic tournament on July 13, 2014. The Jets beat the Gwakji Kings 3-1 in the tournament final. Later that year, the Cup was awarded to the Gwakji Kings at the inaugural Winter Classic tournament on December 7, 2014. The Kings defeated the Samyang Sabres 7-0 in the final.

On May 30, 2015, the Samyang Sabres returned to the final and won the 2015 Jeju Cup Summer Classic, while the Soesokkak Oilers defeated the Hamdeok Blackhawks in the final of the 2015 Jeju Cup Winter Classic on December 13, 2015.

On May 22, 2016, the Gwakji Kings won their second Jeju Cup title at the 2016 Jeju Cup Summer Classic. On December 11, 2016, the Jungmun Jets also captured their second Jeju Cup title, defeating the Iho Hurricanes 3-1 in the final of the 2016 Jeju Cup Winter Classic.

On June 4, 2017, the Jungmun Jets won their third Jeju Cup title (and second consecutive championship), after defeating the Pyoseon Penguins 3-1 in the final of the 2017 Jeju Cup Summer Classic. On December 9, 2017, the Gwakji Kings won their third Jeju Cup title after defeating the Jungmun Jets 2-1 in the final of the 2017 Jeju Cup Winter Classic, stifling the Jets' opportunity at the first three-peat in Jeju Cup history.

On May 13, 2018, the Pyoseon Penguins won their first Jeju Cup title at the 2018 Jeju Cup Summer Classic, defeating the Jungmun Jets 3-1 in the final. On December 15, 2018 at the Winter Classic, the Jungmun Jets were again grounded in the final, this time by the Gwakji Kings in overtime.

On May 12, 2019, the Pyoseon Penguins won their second Jeju Cup title at the 2019 Jeju Cup Summer Classic.

On December 5, 2021, the Jungmun Jets won their fourth Jeju Cup title at the 2021 Jeju Cup Winter Classic after defeating the Gwakji Kings 3-0 in the tournament final.

On May 20, 2022, the Gwakji Kings won their fifth Jeju Cup title at the 2022 Jeju Cup Summer Classic after defeating the Jungmun Jets 2-1 in the sixth game of a best of seven championship series. The Kings won the series four games to two. This was the first time the Jeju Cup was contested in this format.

== Team championship history ==
Ten teams have competed for the Jeju Cup, but only five have ever won it. The Gwakji Kings hold the record for most championship victories by a team with five.

Teams	Total championships	Tournaments won
Jungmun Jets	4	2014 Summer Classic, 2016 Winter Classic, 2017 Summer Classic, 2021 Winter Classic
Gwakji Kings	5	2014 Winter Classic, 2016 Summer Classic, 2017 Winter Classic, 2018 Winter Classic, 2022 Summer Classic
Samyang Sabres	1	2015 Summer Classic
Soesokkak Oilers	1	2015 Winter Classic
Hamdeok Blackhawks	0	
Iho Hurricanes	0	
Pyoseon Penguins	2	2018 Summer Classic, 2019 Summer Classic
Donnaeko Canucks	0	
Seobin Baeksa Lightning	0	
Gimyeong Maple Leafs	0	

== Player championship history ==
83 players have had their name engraved on the Jeju Cup. Twenty-one players have won multiple championships. Sean Pratt, Ty Riddick, Chris Salzwedel, Branko Belan and Jason Hiltz are the only five players to have won the trophy more than twice. Salwedel holds the record for most championships won by a player with four.

Player	Total championships	Tournaments won
Allan Moore	2	2014 Summer Classic, 2016 Winter Classic
Christopher Salzwedel	4	2015 Summer Classic, 2015 Winter Classic, 2021 Winter Classic, 2022 Summer Classic
John Schmale	2	2014 Winter Classic, 2015 Summer Classic
Kendra Song	2	2014 Winter Classic, 2015 Summer Classic
Ryan Brown	2	2014 Winter Classic, 2016 Summer Classic
송정문	2	2014 Summer Classic, 2014 Winter Classic
Ty Riddick	3	2016 Winter Classic, 2017 Summer Classic, 2018 Winter Classic
Amy Sigsworth	1	2017 Summer Classic
Andrew Qiu	1	2015 Summer Classic
Angela Deluigi	1	2015 Winter Classic
Baek Han Na	1	2015 Summer Classic
Blake Archibald	1	2015 Summer Classic
Cassandra Brady	1	2016 Winter Classic
Catrina McBeath	2	2017 Summer Classic, 2018 Summer Classic
Cody Comerford	2	2016 Winter Classic, 2018 Winter Classic
Cole Ulbricht	1	2017 Summer Classic
Cory Beck	1	2014 Winter Classic
Craig Grillanda	1	2014 Winter Classic
Dan Nabben	1	2015 Summer Classic
Dani Leon	1	2017 Summer Classic
Darren Southcott	1	2014 Winter Classic
Dave Cunning	1	2014 Winter Classic
Dave Gagnier	1	2017 Summer Classic
이동수	1	2016 Summer Classic
Elize Blignaut	1	2014 Summer Classic
Eric Hevesy	2	2017 Summer Classic, 2021 Winter Classic
Grande Stevens	1	2017 Summer Classic
Harold Dale	1	2014 Winter Classic
Ian Josephson	2	2015 Winter Classic, 2017 Winter Classic
Jacob Gershkovich	1	2015 Winter Classic
Jaesuk Hwang	1	2015 Winter Classic
James "Peacock" Budd	1	2015 Summer Classic
Jesse Son	1	2016 Summer Classic
Jessica Zafra	1	2016 Summer Classic
Joe Proulx	1	2016 Summer Classic
Joel Laubhan	1	2014 Summer Classic
Jonathan Eisner	2	2016 Winter Classic, 2021 Winter Classic
Luke Moynihan	1	2016 Summer Classic
Matthew Cushman	1	2015 Winter Classic
Matthew Raynor	1	2015 Winter Classic
Mike Flowers	1	2014 Winter Classic
Mike Poirier	1	2016 Winter Classic
Nick Cook	1	2016 Winter Classic
Patrick Conway	1	2014 Winter Classic
Premkumar Natraj	1	2017 Summer Classic
Rob Gibson	1	2014 Summer Classic
Sean Pratt	3	2016 Summer Classic, 2017 Winter Classic, 2018 Winter Classic
Seungju Yang	1	2015 Winter Classic
Skofe A. Lofe	1	2016 Winter Classic
Solomon Walden	1	2015 Winter Classic
Sylvia Paynter	1	2015 Summer Classic
Tyler Theyerl	1	2015 Summer Classic
Tyler Echols	1	2017 Winter Classic
Amy Ward	1	2017 Winter Classic
Chris Hoff	1	2017 Winter Classic
Nadine O'Leary	1	2017 Winter Classic
Tom Meyers	1	2017 Winter Classic
박중호	1	2017 Winter Classic
Rob Defelice	2	2017 Winter Classic, 2018 Summer Classic
Riley Newman	1	2018 Summer Classic
Chad Kuffner	1	2018 Summer Classic
Steve Dufresne	2	2018 Summer Classic, 2018 Winter Classic
Michelle Curtin	1	2018 Summer Classic
Branko Belan	3	2018 Summer Classic, 2018 Winter Classic, 2022 Summer Classic
Sean Killeen	2	2018 Summer Classic, 2021 Winter Classic
Jason Hiltz	3	2014 Summer Classic, 2021 Winter Classic, 2022 Summer Classic
Kurt Perry	1	2018 Summer Classic
Jason Motz	1	2018 Summer Classic
Yumi Kang	1	2014 Summer Classic
Kevin Kinahan	1	2018 Winter Classic
Kathie Le	1	2018 Winter Classic
Steph Smith	1	2018 Winter Classic
Matthew Gratz	1	2018 Winter Classic
Kevin Corbin	2	2021 Winter Classic, 2022 Summer Classic
Sarah Hodgkiss	2	2021 Winter Classic, 2022 Summer Classic
Travis Perryman	2	2021 Winter Classic, 2022 Summer Classic
Chris Ardell	1	2021 Winter Classic
왕가기	1	2021 Winter Classic
민규서	1	2021 Winter Classic
전신	1	2021 Winter Classic
Jenna Turner	1	2022 Summer Classic
Stephan Gouws	1	2022 Summer Classic
Shin Min	1	2018 Winter Classic
