= 2011 Ball Hockey World Championship =

2011 edition of the Ball Hockey World Championship

Tournament details
- Host country: Slovakia
- Venue: 1 (in 1 host city)

Final positions
- Champions: Czech Republic (3rd title)
- Runners-up: Canada
- Third place: Slovakia

Tournament statistics
- Scoring leader: (United States) Denny Schlegel (10 goals)

The 2011 Ball Hockey World Championship was the ninth Ball Hockey World Championship held by ISBHF in Bratislava, Slovakia. 2009 champions the Czech Republic defended their title and won the championship for the third time, beating Canada in the final.

== Elite Division ==
Ten teams formed two groups of five. Group A contained the Czech Republic, Canada, Portugal, Germany and Finland. Group B consisted of Slovakia, the United States, Austria, Greece and Switzerland. Group winners advanced to the semifinals, while teams finishing second and third played a knockout match (A2 versus B3 and A3 versus B2) to determine the other two semifinalists. At the quarterfinal stage, the Czech Republic conceded the first goal against Greece before taking a come-from-behind 5–1 win. In the semifinals, held at the Ondrej Nepela Arena on 25 June 2011, the Czech Republic beat Slovakia 2–0, while Canada defeated the United States 6–5. Slovakia won the bronze medal game against the United States, to extend their record of winning a medal in every edition of the championship. In the final the Czech Republic scored the only goal of the first period after 5 minutes. They scored twice more in the second period, either side of a Canada goal, for a 3–1 scoreline. A goalless final period confirmed their eighth medal in the world championship and third gold. Further down the rankings, Finland beat Germany 4–3 for 7th place, while Austria defeated Switzerland in overtime for 9th place.

=== Play off ===
Quarterfinals
B2	Greece	1
A3	Czech Republic	5
A2	Portugal	2
B3	United States	5

Semifinals
B1	Slovakia	0
A3	Czech Republic	2
A1	Canada	6
B3	United States	5

Finals
A3	Czech Republic	3
A1	Canada	1
Bronze medal game
B1	Slovakia	7
B3	United States	2

=== Match for 9th place ===
Austria	5–4 OT (0–1, 3–1, 1–2) (OT: 1–0)	Switzerland

Game reference

=== Match for 7th place ===
25 June 2011; 15:00	Finland	4–3 (1–0, 0–3, 3–0)	Germany	Ondrej Nepela Arena, Bratislava

Game reference

=== Quarterfinals ===
24 June 2011; 18:00	Czech Republic	5–1 (0–1, 4–0, 1–0)	Greece	Ondrej Nepela Arena, Bratislava

=== Semifinals ===
25 June 2011	Slovakia	0–2 (0–2, 0–0, 0–0)	Czech Republic	Ondrej Nepela Arena, Bratislava; Attendance: 2,000

25 June 2011	Canada	6–5 (2–1, 3–2, 1–2)	United States	Ondrej Nepela Arena, Bratislava

=== Bronze medal game ===
26 June 2011; 15:00	Slovakia	7–2 (2–0, 3–1, 2–1)	United States	Ondrej Nepela Arena, Bratislava

=== Final ===
26 June 2011; 18:00	Canada	1–3 (0–1, 1–2, 0–0)	Czech Republic	Ondrej Nepela Arena, Bratislava; Attendance: 1,000

== Pool B ==
Pool B was also held in Bratislava. Two groups of four teams played a round-robin format. The top two teams in each group advanced to the semifinals. Winners of the semifinals, France and Pakistan, each secured progress to the 2013 Ball Hockey World Championship. Pakistan defeated France in the Pool B final 6–5 in overtime.

=== Group A ===
Team	Pld	W	D	L	GF	GA	GD	Pts
Bermuda	3	2	1	0	18	2	+16	5
(United Kingdom) Great Britain	3	2	0	1	9	10	−1	4
Cayman Islands	3	1	1	1	9	3	+6	3
Hungary	3	0	0	3	3	24	−21	0

Source: bratislava2011.com

(United Kingdom) Great Britain	5–2 (0–1, 1–1, 4–0)	Hungary

(United Kingdom) Great Britain	3–2 (2–0, 1–2, 0–0)	Cayman Islands

21 June 2011	Bermuda	6–1 (0–0, 4–1, 2–0)	(United Kingdom) Great Britain	Ondrej Nepela Arena, Bratislava

Game reference

Cayman Islands	7–0 (1–0, 3–0, 3–0)	Hungary

22 June 2011	Bermuda	12–1 (5–0, 3–1, 4–0)	Hungary

Game reference

23 June 2011	Bermuda	0–0 (0–0, 0–0, 0–0)	Cayman Islands

Game reference

=== Group B ===
Team	Pld	W	D	L	GF	GA	GD	Pts
France	3	3	0	0	17	11	+6	6
Pakistan	3	2	0	1	14	9	+5	4
Hong Kong	3	1	0	2	6	4	+2	2
Spain	3	0	0	3	5	18	−13	0

Source: bratislava2011.com

Pakistan	7–0 (3–0, 2–0, 2–0)	Spain

France	2–1 (1–0, 0–1, 1–0)	Hong Kong

France	7–5 (3–0, 3–1, 1–4)	Spain

Pakistan	2–1 (0–0, 2–0, 0–1)	Hong Kong

France	8–5 (4–2, 2–3, 2–0)	Pakistan

Hong Kong	4–0 (1–0, 1–0, 2–0)	Spain

=== Match for 7th place (Pool B) ===
Spain	3–1 (0–0, 1–1, 2–0)	Hungary

=== Match for 5th place (Pool B) ===
Cayman Islands	2–1 (1–0, 0–0, 1–1)	Hong Kong

=== Semifinals ===
Pakistan	3–2 (0–1, 0–0, 3–1)	Bermuda

France	2–1 (0–0, 0–0, 2–1)	(United Kingdom) Great Britain

=== Match for 3rd place (Pool B) ===
25 June 2011	Bermuda	6–2 (2–0, 0–2, 4–0)	(United Kingdom) Great Britain

Game reference

=== Final (Pool B) ===
Pakistan	6–5 OT (1–1, 2–1, 2–3) (OT: 1–0)	France

Game reference

=== Final standings ===
	Team
1st	Pakistan
2nd	France
3rd	Bermuda
4th	(United Kingdom) Great Britain
5th	Cayman Islands
6th	Hong Kong
7th	Spain
8th	Hungary
