= Bermuda men's national ball hockey team =

Bermuda
- Nickname: Bermuda
- Association: Bermuda Ball Hockey Association (BBHA)
- Head coach: Mike Moore (born 1969)
- Captain: Christopher Merritt

Biggest win
- Bermuda 11 - 0 Cayman Islands (Ratingen, Germany, 2005)

Biggest defeat
- Canada 15 - 1 Bermuda (Zug, Switzerland, 2015)

Ball Hockey World Championship
- Appearances: 12 (first in 2001)
- Best result: 5th (2001)

The Bermuda national ball hockey team has been representing Bermuda in the Ball Hockey World Championship since 2001. Is member of the International Street and Ball Hockey Federation (ISBHF).

== World Championship ==
Year	Location	Result
2001	Toronto, Canada	5th place
2003	Sierre, Switzerland	9th place
2005	Pittsburgh, United States	13th place
2007	Ratingen, Germany	13th place
2009	Plzeň, Czech Republic	8th place
2011	Bratislava, Slovakia	13th place
2013	St.John's, Canada	1st place B Pool
2015	Zug, Switzerland	11th place
2017	Pardubice, Czech Republic	18th place
2019	Košice, Slovakia	14th place
2022	Laval, Canada	9th place
2024	Visp, Switzerland	15th place
