= Slovak national hockey team =

Slovak national hockey team may refer to:

- Slovakia national ball hockey team (Men's)
- Slovakia men's national field hockey team
- Slovakia women's national field hockey team
- Slovakia men's national ice hockey team
- Slovakia women's national ice hockey team
- Slovakia men's national inline hockey team
