= 2022 Ball Hockey World Championship =

Tournament details
- Host country: Canada
- Venue: 1 (in 1 host city)
- Dates: 21 – 27 June 2022
- Teams: 10

Final positions
- Champions: Canada (6th title)
- Runners-up: Czech Republic
- Third place: United States

The 2022 Ball Hockey World Championship was the 14th ball hockey world championship, and was held in Laval, Canada. The tournament began on 21 June 2022, with the gold medal game held on 27 June 2022. Slovakia failed to win a medal for the first time in tournament history after losing to Greece in the quarterfinals. Although they went on to defeat Italy 9–0 in the 5th place play-off, national team coach Mojmír Hojer resigned from his position after the tournament.

== Venue ==
Laval
Place Bell
Capacity: 10,062
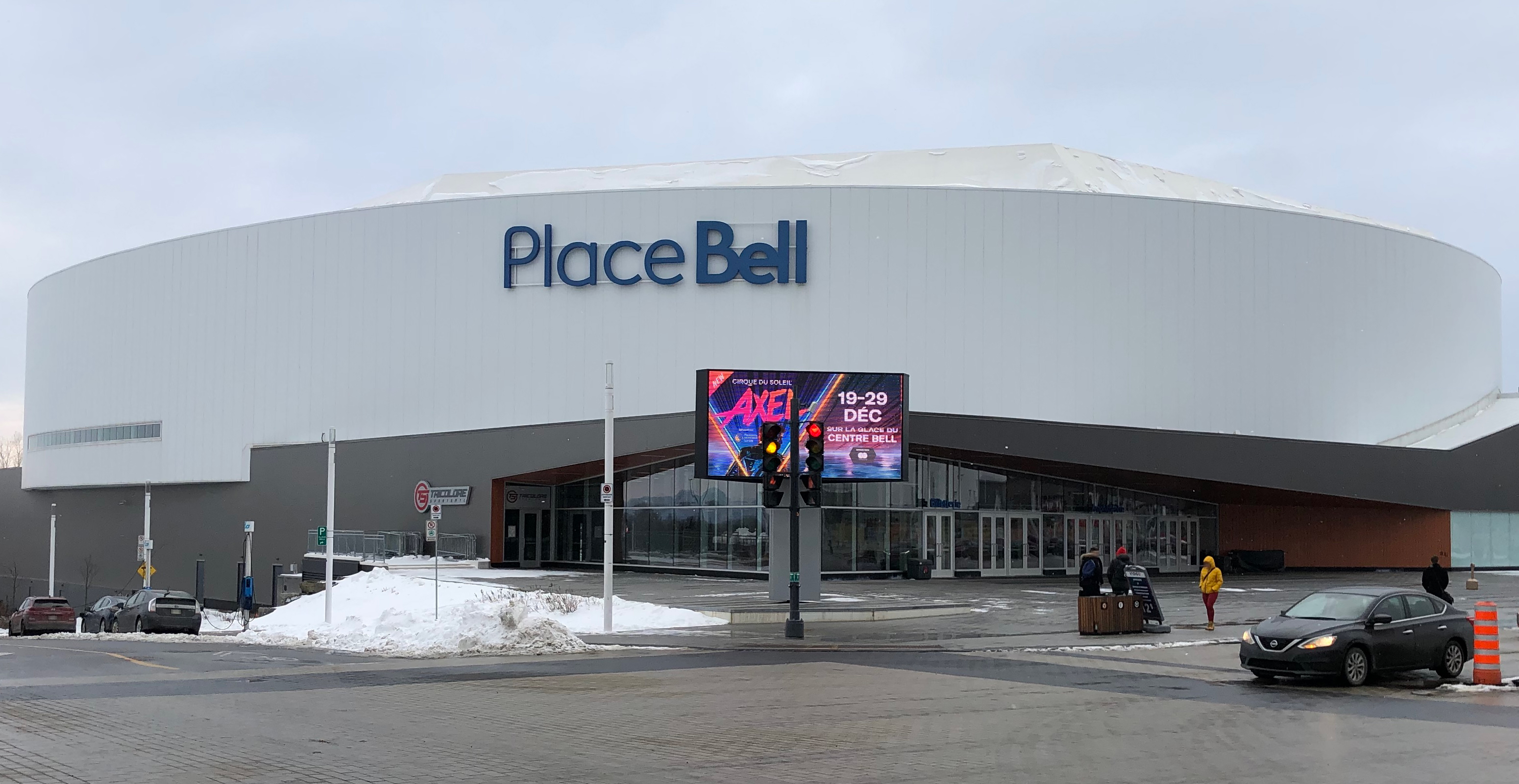

== Participants ==
Group A

- Slovakia
- Czech Republic
- Italy
- Haiti
- (United Kingdom) Great Britain

Group B

- Canada
- Greece
- Armenia
- United States
- Finland

=== Final ===
Rank	Country
1st place, gold medalist(s)	Canada
2nd place, silver medalist(s)	Czech Republic
3rd place, bronze medalist(s)	United States
4	Greece
5	Slovakia
6	Italy
7	Finland
8	Haiti
9	Bermuda
10	Lebanon
11	(United Kingdom) Great Britain
12	Armenia
13	France
14	Hong Kong
15	Pakistan
16	Cayman Islands

Women's

- Czech Republic
- (United States) USA
- Canada
- Slovakia
- (United Kingdom) Great Britain
- Lebanon
