= 2019 Ball Hockey World Championship =

Tournament details
- Host country: Slovakia
- Venue: 1 (in 1 host city)
- Dates: 14 – 22 June 2019

Final positions
- Champions: Slovakia (5th title)
- Runners-up: Finland
- Third place: Canada

The 2019 Ball Hockey World Championship was the 13th ball hockey world championship, and was held in Košice, Slovakia. The tournament began on 14 June 2019, with the gold medal game to be played on 22 June 2019. The Canada women's national ball hockey team defeated the United States women's national ball hockey team in the women's final to capture the gold medal, while the Czech Republic emerged with the bronze.

== Venue ==
Košice
Steel Aréna
Capacity: 8,378
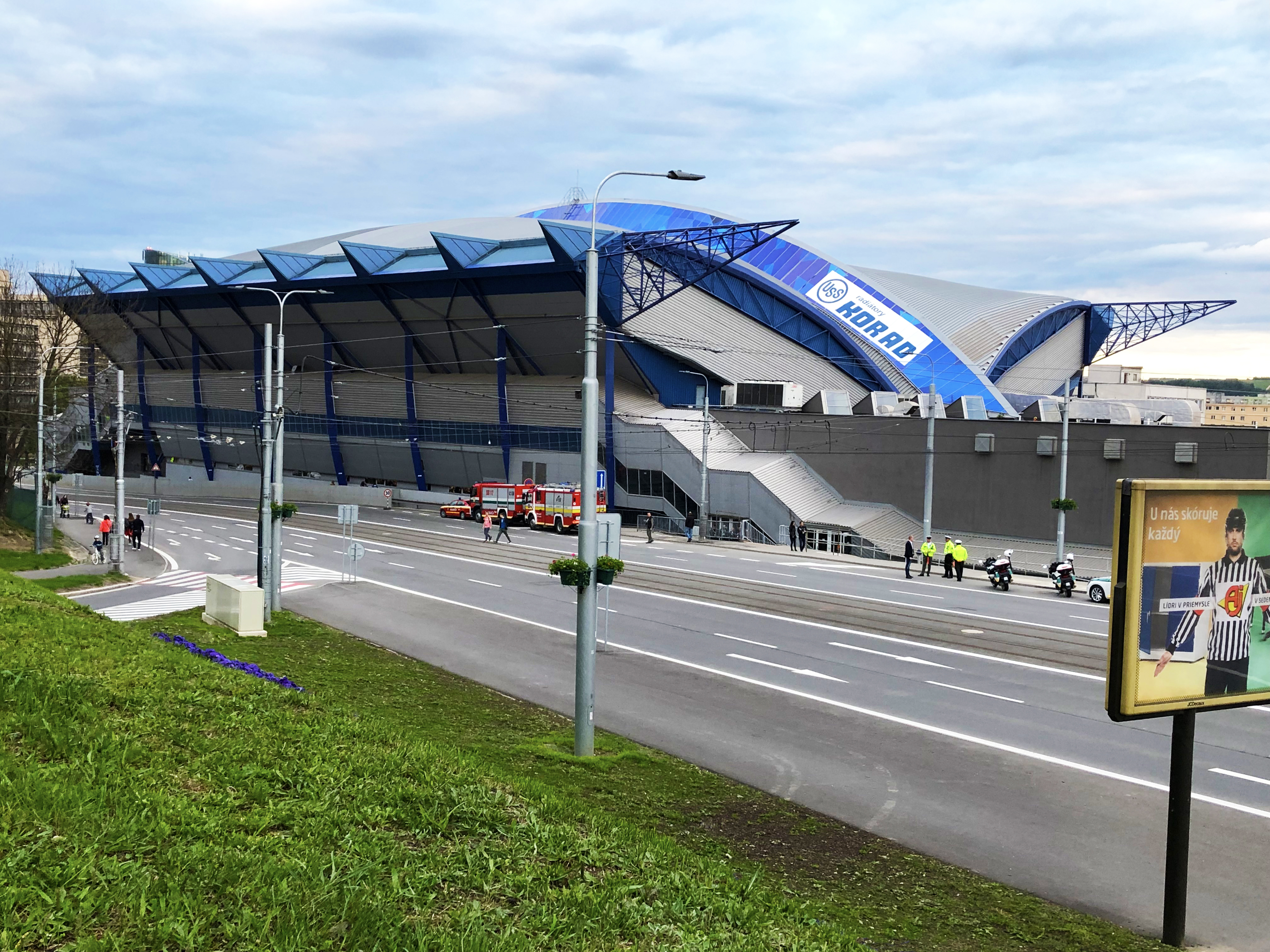

== Participants ==
Group A1

- Slovakia
- Czech Republic
- (United States) USA
- Finland
- (United Kingdom) Great Britain

Group A2

- Canada
- Greece
- Switzerland
- Italy
- Haiti

Group Q

- Hong Kong
- Armenia
- Cayman Islands
- Lebanon
- Bermuda

Women's

- Czech Republic
- (United States) USA
- Canada
- Slovakia
- (United Kingdom) Great Britain

=== Final ===
Rank	Country
1st place, gold medalist(s)	Slovakia
2nd place, silver medalist(s)	Finland
3rd place, bronze medalist(s)	Canada
4	Czech Republic
5	Italy
6	Switzerland
7	United States
8	Greece
9	Cayman Islands
10	United Kingdom
11	Hong Kong
12	Haiti
13	Lebanon
14	Bermuda
15	Armenia

== Awards and honors ==
=== Women's tournament ===
==== All-Star Team ====
- Samantha Bolwell: Great Britain
- Denisa Křížová: Czech Republic
- Lucie Manhartová : Czech Republic
- Jessie McCann: Canada
- Cherie Stewart: United States
- Lucia Zábroská: Slovakia
