= France men's national ball hockey team =

France
- Association: Association Française de Hockey Ball (A.F.H.B)
- Head coach: Eric Golay
- Captain: Gaël Benbekhti
- Most games: Benoit Proutat
- Top scorer: Dominic Martel
- Most points: Dominic Martel
- Home stadium: Cergy
- Team colors: Bleu Blanc Rouge

Biggest win
- France 9 - 4 Libyan (Libya) (Pardubice, Czech Republic June, 2017)

Biggest defeat
- Czech Republic 20 - 0 France (St.John's, Canada June, 2013)

Ball Hockey World Championship
- Appearances: 7 (first in 2011)
- Best result: 8th (2026)

The France men's national ball hockey team is the men's national ball hockey team of France, and a member of the International Street and Ball Hockey Federation (ISBHF).

== World Championships ==
Year	Location	Result
2011	Bratislava, Slovakia	12th place
2013	St.John's, Canada	10th place
2015	Zug, Switzerland	16th place
2017	Pardubice, Czech Republic	11th place
2022	Laval, Canada	13th place
2024	Visp, Switzerland	14th place
2026	Ostrava, Czech Republic	8th place
