= Slovakia men's national ball hockey team =

Slovakia
- Nickname: Slovakia
- Association: Slovenská hokejbalová únia
- Head coach: Milan Rampáček (2022)
- Captain: Jozef Minárik

Biggest win
- Slovakia 16 - 0 Hungary (Litoměřice, Czech Republic, 1998)

Biggest defeat
- Czech Republic 4 - 1 Slovakia (Ratingen, Germany, 2007)

Ball Hockey World Championship
- Appearances: 15 (first in 1996)
- Best result: 1st (1999, 2013, 2015, 2017, 2019)

Slovakia men's national ball hockey team
Medal record

World Championships
Gold medal – first place	1999 Slovakia	Team
Gold medal – first place	2013 Canada	Team
Gold medal – first place	2015 Switzerland	Team
Gold medal – first place	2017 Czech Republic	Team
Gold medal – first place	2019 Slovakia	Team
Silver medal – second place	1998 Czech Republic	Team
Silver medal – second place	2005 United States	Team
Bronze medal – third place	1996 Slovakia	Team
Bronze medal – third place	2001 Canada	Team
Bronze medal – third place	2003 Switzerland	Team
Bronze medal – third place	2007 Germany	Team
Bronze medal – third place	2009 Czech Republic	Team
Bronze medal – third place	2011 Slovakia	Team

The Slovakia men's national ball hockey team is the men's national ball hockey team of Slovakia, and a member of the International Street and Ball Hockey Federation (ISBHF). The side won a medal in each Ball Hockey World Championship until 2022, when the team lost to Greece in the quarter-finals and eventually finished fifth.

== World Championships ==
Year	Location	Result
1996	Bratislava, Slovakia	Bronze
1998	Litoměřice, Czech Republic	Silver
1999	Zvolen, Slovakia	Gold
2001	Toronto, Canada	Bronze
2003	Sierra, Switzerland	Bronze
2005	Pittsburgh, USA	Silver
2007	Ratingen, Germany	Bronze
2009	Plzeň, Czech Republic	Bronze
2011	Bratislava, Slovakia	Bronze
2013	St.John's, Canada	Gold
2015	Zug, Switzerland	Gold
2017	Pardubice, Czech Republic	Gold
2019	Košice, Slovakia	Gold
2022	Laval, Canada	5th
2024	Visp, Switzerland	5th
2026	Ostrava, Czech Republic	6th
