= Matthew Leal =

American soccer player

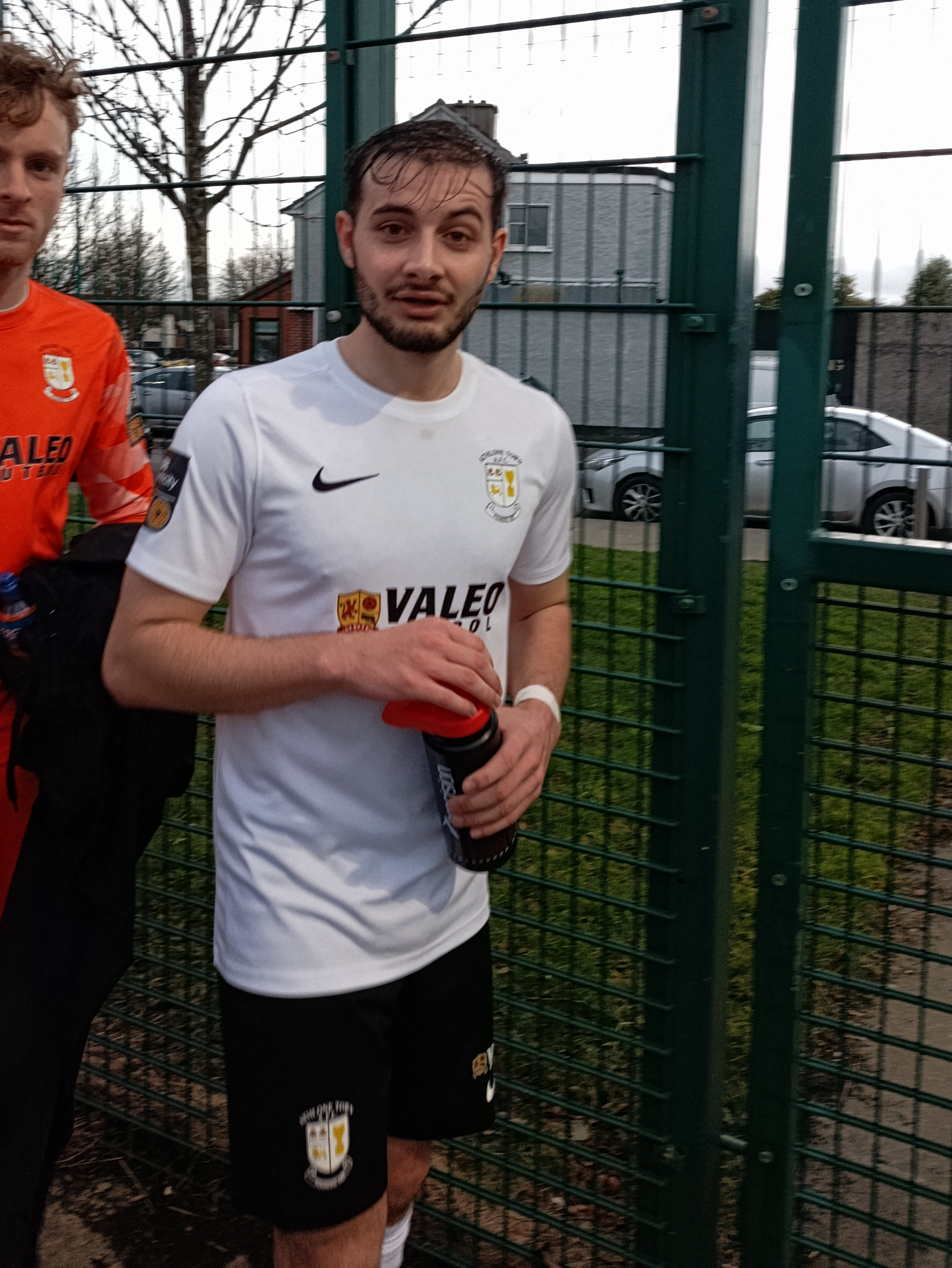
- Leal after playing for Athlone Town in 2025

Personal information
- Full name: Matthew Jacob Leal
- Date of birth: February 21, 2003 (age 23)
- Place of birth: Newton, Massachusetts, United States
- Height: 6 ft 0 in (1.83 m)
- Positions: Center-back; midfielder

Team information
- Current team: Athlone Town
- Number: 23

Youth career
- 2016–2017: EF Belém Estádio Restelo
- 2017–2018: Belenenses
- 2018–2019: Sacavenense
- 2019–2022: Casa Pia

Senior career*
Years	Team	Apps	(Gls)
2022–2025	Athlone Town	45	(3)
- * Club domestic league appearances and goals as of 16:01, July 1, 2025 (UTC)

Matthew Jacob Leal (born February 21, 2003) is an American professional soccer player who plays as a center-back.

== Career ==
In 2016, Matthew competed in the IberCup, an international tournament. In July 2017, he joined C.F. Os Belenenses. His European Union passport makes him eligible to play for any European team.

== Personal life ==
He is originally from Newton, Massachusetts. His twin brother, Patrick Leal, is also a soccer player who plays for Las Vegas Lights FC. He is of Portuguese descent through his father and holds a Portuguese passport.
