= 2017 Ball Hockey World Championship =

Tournament details
- Host country: Czech Republic
- Venue: 1 (in 1 host city)
- Dates: 1 – 10 June 2017

The 2017 Ball Hockey World Championship was the 12th ball hockey world championship, held in Pardubice, Czech Republic. Pardubice was announced as the host city in January 2015. It was the third time the championship was held in the Czech Republic after the 1998 and 2009 championships, which took place in Litoměřice and Plzeň, respectively.

18 men's teams took part in the tournament, which began on 1 June 2017 with the opening match of Slovakia versus India. Slovakia entered the tournament as the defending champions, having won the last two world championships. The women's competition began two days later, on 3 June.

== Venue ==
Pardubice
Tipsport arena
Capacity: 10,300
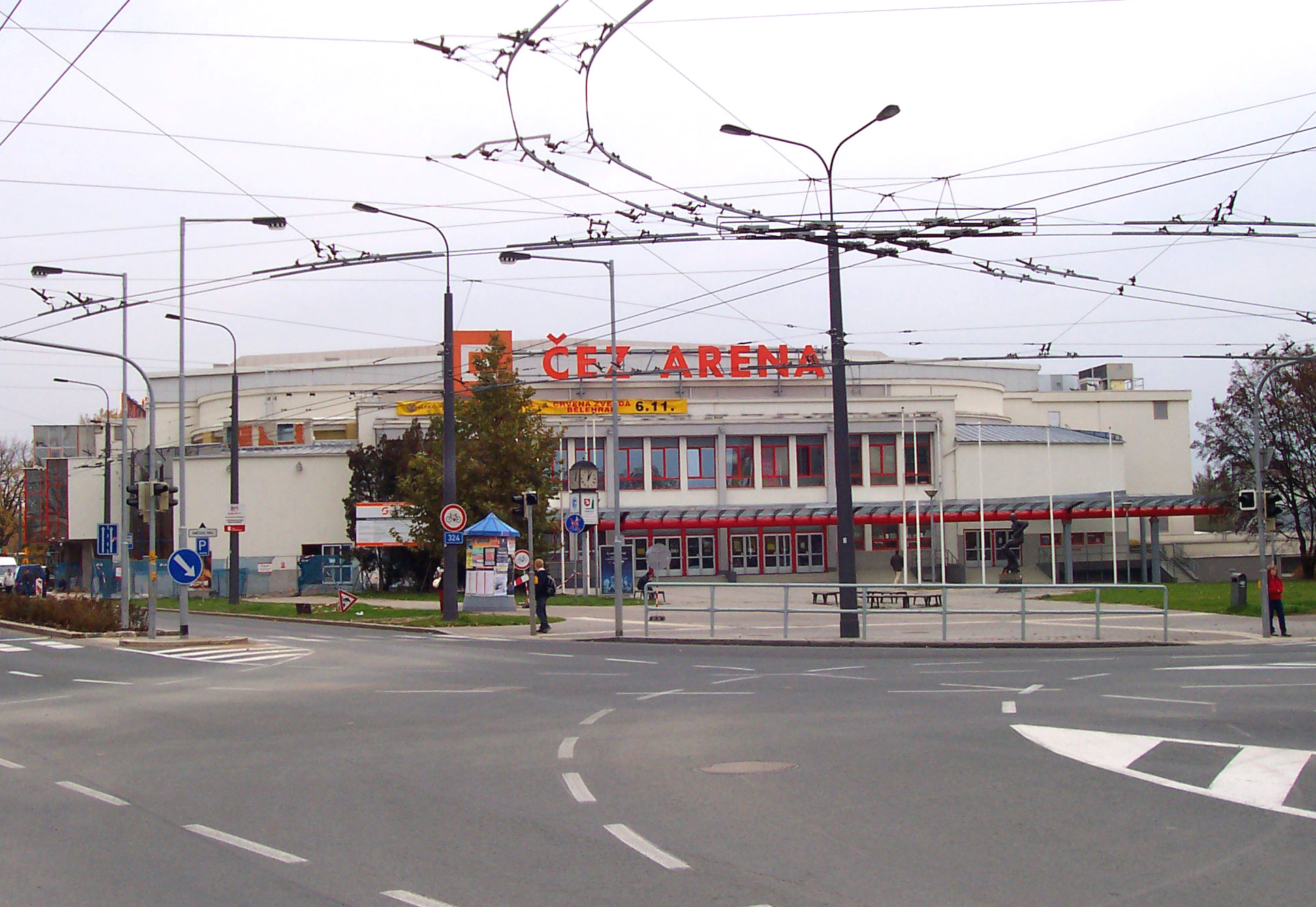

== Participants ==
=== Division A ===
Group A1

- Canada
- Finland
- Greece
- India
- Slovakia

Group A2

- Czech Republic
- Italy
- Portugal
- Switzerland
- (United States) USA

=== Division B ===
Group B1

- Bermuda
- France
- (United Kingdom) Great Britain
- Lebanon

Group B2

- Armenia
- Cayman Islands
- Haiti
- Hong Kong

== Preliminary round ==
The schedule was announced on 20 January 2017.

=== Division A ===
Group A1

Team	Pld	W	OTW	OTL	L	GF	GA	GD	Pts	Qualification
Slovakia	4	4	0	0	0	12	3	+9	8	Quarterfinals
Canada	4	2	1	0	1	19	7	+12	6	Quarterfinals
India	4	2	0	0	2	8	12	−4	4	Quarterfinals
Greece	4	1	0	1	2	8	10	−2	3	Quarterfinals
Finland	4	0	0	0	4	3	18	−15	0	9th to 12th playoff

Source: pardubice2017.cz

1 June 2017; 14:00	Slovakia	3–1 (3–1, 0–0, 0–0)	India	Tipsport arena, Pardubice

1 June 2017; 20:30	Greece	3–4 GWS (0–1, 1–1, 2–1) (OT: 0–0) (SO: 0–1)	Canada	Tipsport arena, Pardubice

2 June 2017; 13:30	India	3–0 (0–0, 2–0, 1–0)	Greece	Tipsport arena, Pardubice

2 June 2017; 16:00	Finland	1–3 (0–2, 1–1, 0–0)	Slovakia	Tipsport arena, Pardubice

3 June 2017; 14:00	Finland	1–7 (1–3, 0–2, 0–2)	Canada	Tipsport arena, Pardubice

3 June 2017; 21:30	Slovakia	3–1 (0–1, 1–0, 2–0)	Greece	Tipsport arena, Pardubice

4 June 2017; 19:30	Canada	8–0 (2–0, 1–0, 5–0)	India	Tipsport arena, Pardubice

5 June 2017; 13:30	Greece	4–0 (3–0, 1–0, 0–0)	Finland	Tipsport arena, Pardubice

6 June 2017; 14:00	India	4–1 (1–1, 1–0, 2–0)	Finland	Tipsport arena, Pardubice

6 June 2017; 21:30	Canada	0–3 (0–0, 0–2, 0–1)	Slovakia	Tipsport arena, Pardubice

Group A2

Team	Pld	W	OTW	OTL	L	GF	GA	GD	Pts	Qualification
United States	4	3	1	0	0	15	8	+7	8	Quarterfinals
Czech Republic	4	3	0	1	0	21	3	+18	7	Quarterfinals
Portugal	4	2	0	0	2	12	14	−2	4	Quarterfinals
Switzerland	4	1	0	0	3	10	10	0	2	Quarterfinals
Italy	4	0	0	0	4	8	31	−23	0	9th to 12th playoff

Source: pardubice2017.cz

1 June 2017; 18:00	Czech Republic	6–0 (3–0, 2–0, 1–0)	Switzerland	Tipsport arena, Pardubice

=== Division B ===
Group B1

Team	Pld	W	OTW	OTL	L	GF	GA	GD	Pts	Qualification
France	3	2	0	1	0	16	11	+5	5	Group B3
(United Kingdom) Great Britain	3	2	0	0	1	10	8	+2	4	Group B3
Bermuda	3	1	1	0	1	10	10	0	4	Group B4
Lebanon	3	0	0	0	3	7	14	−7	0	Group B4

Source: pardubice2017.cz

1 June 2017; 14:00	France	4–3 (1–1, 1–1, 2–1)	(United Kingdom) Great Britain

Group B2

Team	Pld	W	OTW	OTL	L	GF	GA	GD	Pts	Qualification
Haiti	3	3	0	0	0	14	7	+7	6	Group B3
Cayman Islands	3	1	1	0	1	15	11	+4	4	Group B3
Armenia	3	0	1	0	2	5	10	−5	2	Group B4
Hong Kong	3	0	0	2	1	8	14	−6	2	Group B4

Source: pardubice2017.cz

1 June 2017; 18:20	Haiti	7–5 (3–2, 1–3, 3–0)	Cayman Islands

1 June 2017; 20:40	Armenia	4–3 (2–0, 1–0, 0–3, 1-0)	Hong Kong

Group B3

Team	Pld	W	OTW	OTL	L	GF	GA	GD	Pts	Qualification
France	3	3	0	0	0	10	6	+4	6	9th to 12th playoff
Haiti	3	2	0	0	1	11	7	+4	4	9th to 12th playoff
Cayman Islands	3	1	0	0	2	12	14	−2	2	13th to 16th playoff
(United Kingdom) Great Britain	3	0	0	0	3	6	12	−6	0	13th to 16th playoff

Source: pardubice2017.cz

Group B4

Team	Pld	W	OTW	OTL	L	GF	GA	GD	Pts	Qualification
Armenia	3	2	1	0	0	12	7	+5	6	13th to 16th playoff
Hong Kong	3	2	0	1	0	11	4	+7	5	13th to 16th playoff
Bermuda	3	1	0	0	2	5	8	−3	2	Seventeenth place game
Lebanon	3	0	0	0	3	4	13	−9	0	Seventeenth place game

Source: pardubice2017.cz

== Knockout stage ==
=== Seventeenth place game ===
8 June 2017; 10:00	Bermuda	1–6 (0–3, 1–1, 0–2)	Lebanon

=== 13th to 16th playoff ===
Semifinals

8 June 2017; 16:00	Cayman Islands	2–3 (0–0, 0–3, 2–0)	Hong Kong

8 June 2017; 19:00	Great Britain (United Kingdom)	4–2 (1–0, 2–1, 1–1)	Armenia

Fifteenth place game

9 June 2017; 12:30	Cayman Islands	3–6 (0–1, 2–3, 1–2)	Armenia

Thirteenth place game

9 June 2017; 17:30	Hong Kong	6–3 (3–1, 1–1, 2–1)	(United Kingdom) Great Britain

=== 9th to 12th playoff ===
Semifinals

8 June 2017; 10:00	Finland	3–1 (0–0, 1–0, 2–1)	France	Tipsport arena, Pardubice

8 June 2017; 13:00	Italy	2–0 (0–0, 1–0, 1–0)	Haiti

Eleventh place game

9 June 2017; 13:00	France	4–1 (2–0, 1–0, 1–1)	Haiti

Ninth place game

10 June 2017; 10:30	Finland	6–3 (3–1, 1–1, 2–1)	Italy

=== Quarterfinals ===
8 June 2017; 13:00	United States	3–4 OT (2–1, 1–1, 0–1) (OT: 0–1)	Greece	Tipsport arena, Pardubice

8 June 2017; 16:00	Slovakia	4–0 (1–0, 1–0, 2–0)	Portugal	Tipsport arena, Pardubice

8 June 2017; 19:00	Czech Republic	3–1 (0–0, 0–0, 3–1)	India	Tipsport arena, Pardubice

8 June 2017; 21:30	Canada	5–1 (2–0, 1–1, 2–0)	Switzerland	Tipsport arena, Pardubice

=== 5th to 8th playoff ===
Semifinals

9 June 2017; 08:30	Portugal	4–3 (3–2, 0–1, 1–0)	India	Tipsport arena, Pardubice

9 June 2017; 11:00	United States	6–3 (2–1, 3–1, 1–1)	Switzerland	Tipsport arena, Pardubice

Seventh place game

10 June 2017; 13:00	Switzerland	5–0	India

Win awarded via forfeit

Fifth place game

10 June 2017; 15:00	United States	8–2 (0–0, 3–1, 5–1)	Portugal

=== Semifinals ===
9 June 2017; 16:00	Canada	5–0 (3–0, 1–0, 1–0)	Greece	Tipsport arena, Pardubice

9 June 2017; 21:15	Slovakia	1–0 GWS (0–0, 0–0, 0–0) (OT: 0–0) (SO: 1–0)	Czech Republic	Tipsport arena, Pardubice

=== Third place game ===
10 June 2017; 14:10	Czech Republic	4–3 (2–1, 2–1, 0–1)	Greece	Tipsport arena, Pardubice

=== Final ===
10 June 2017; 17:00	Slovakia	6–4 (3–2, 1–2, 2–0)	Canada	Tipsport arena, Pardubice

=== Final standings ===
Rank	Country
1st place, gold medalist(s)	Slovakia
2nd place, silver medalist(s)	Canada
3rd place, bronze medalist(s)	Czech Republic
4	Greece
5	United States
6	Portugal
7	Switzerland
8	India
9	Finland
10	Italy
11	France
12	Haiti
13	Hong Kong
14	United Kingdom
15	Armenia
16	Cayman Islands
17	Lebanon
18	Bermuda

== Awards and honors ==
=== Women’s tournament ===
- Most Valuable Player: Kateřina Zechovská, Czech Republic
- Leading Scorer: Jamie Lee Rattray, Canada
- Best goalkeeper: Zuzana Tomčíková, Slovakia
- Best defenseman: Kristen Cooze, Canada
- Best forward: Denisa Křížová, Czech Republic
- Tournament All-stars:
  - Rachel Jackson (Great Britain)
  - Veronika Volkova (Czech Republic)
  - Stephanie Caban (USA)
  - Taylor Stedman (USA)
  - Lucie Manhartová (Czech Republic)
  - Alicia Furletti Blomberg (Italia)
- Fair-play award: Team Great Britain
