= 1996 Ball Hockey World Championship =

The 1996 Ball Hockey World Championship was the first ever Ball Hockey World Championship.

The championship was played in Slovakia from 11 to 15 June 1996. Canada became champions.

== Participants ==
- Austria
- Canada
- Czech Republic
- Germany
- Russia
- Slovakia
- Switzerland

== Preliminary round ==
Pos	Team	Pld	W	D	L	GF	GA	GD	Pts
1	Czech Republic	6	5	1	0	–	–	—	11
2	Slovakia	6	4	2	0	–	–	—	10
3	Canada	6	4	1	1	54	13	+41	9
4	Germany	0	–	–	–	–	–	—	0
5	Austria	0	–	–	–	–	–	—	0
6	Russia	0	–	–	–	–	–	—	0
7	Switzerland	0	–	–	–	–	–	—	0

== Play off ==
=== Semifinal ===
Canada	4 – 1	Slovakia

Czech Republic	9 – 3	Germany

=== Bronze medal game ===
Slovakia	5 – 1	Germany

=== Final ===
Canada	5 – 2	Czech Republic
