= 2013 Ball Hockey World Championship =

International ball hockey tournament held in Canada

Tournament details
- Host country: Canada
- Venues: 2 (in 2 host cities)
- Dates: 2 – 6 June 2013
- Teams: 17

Tournament statistics
- Games played: 17
- Goals scored: 194 (11.41 per game)
- Scoring leader: (Czech Republic) Jan Bacovský

The 2013 Ball Hockey World Championship was the tenth ball hockey world championship held by the ISBHF. The tournament took place over eight days at the Jack Byrne Arena in Torbay and the Glacier Arena in Mount Pearl, Canada, with 78 games across three divisions (men's A-Pool, men's B-Pool, and women's).

Slovakia won their second men's title, defeating the Czech Republic 2–1 in the final. Canada captured the bronze medal with a 7–3 victory over Portugal. The Canada women's national ball hockey team won the gold medal in the women's tournament, with Dawn Tulk scoring both goals in a 2–0 victory over Slovakia. In the B-Pool, Bermuda won the title over Italy in a shootout, while Israel took bronze in their first-ever World Championship appearance.

== Group A ==
Team	Pld	W	D	L	GF	GA	GD	Pts
Canada	4	4	0	0	25	5	+20	8
Slovakia	4	3	0	1	16	5	+11	6
Greece	4	2	0	2	12	5	+7	4
Germany	4	1	0	3	8	26	−18	2
Pakistan	4	0	0	4	8	28	−20	0

Slovakia	8 – 1 (2–1, 2–0, 4–0)	Pakistan	Jack Byrne Arena

Jozef Bratina
Goalies
Ibad Khan

L.Madera – 05:24	1–0
	1–1	06:11 – Munawwar Hamdani
M.Slovak – 08:51	2–1
M.Slovak – 18:25	3–1
M.Haring – 19:49	4–1
J.Martinusik – 30:24	5–1
R.Bujdak – 34:00	6–1
M.Slovak – 39:39	7–1
L.Madera – 39:54	8–1

42
Shots
17

Canada	11 – 0 (5–0, 4–0, 2–0)	Germany	Jack Byrne Arena

Fabio Luongo
Goalies
Maximilian Duerr

J.Pender – 00:16	1–0
M.Frechette – 03:45	2–0
A.Sweetland (PP) – 04:03	3–0
M.Frechette – 08:33	4–0
A.Sweetland – 11:47	5–0
S.Morello – 16:11	6–0
C.Chilarducci – 22:08	7–0
C.Chilarducci – 24:45	8–0
N.Dias – 30:23	9–0
D.Morency – 32:34	10–0
N.Dias – 39:05	11–0

42
Shots
19

Slovakia	6 – 0 (2–0, 2–0, 2–0)	Germany	Jack Byrne Arena

Stanislav Petrik
Goalies
Maximilian Duerr

J.Martinusik – 12:30	1–0
O.Slachtic – 12:58	2–0
J.Martinusik (PP) – 19:50	3–0
M.Slovak – 21:55	4–0
M.Hrivnák – 41:08	5–0
M.Slovak – 44:18	6–0

44
Shots
10

Canada	3 – 2 (1–1, 2–1, 0–0)	Greece	Jack Byrne Arena

Timothy Barlow
Goalies
Fotios Moshonas

	0–1	06:52 – K.Kuermarski
N.Dias – 13:53	1–1
	1–2	15:23 – K.Kuermarski
J.Pender – 23:06	2–2
M.Frechette – 26:02	3–2

29
Shots
14

Greece	4 – 0 (1–0, 2–0, 1–0)	Pakistan	Jack Byrne Arena

Ioannis Vrettis
Goalies
Ibad Khan

K.Kuermarski – 04:44	1–0
K.Kuermarski – 17:33	2–0
K.Kuermarski – 20:41	3–0
C.Stojsin – 42:40	4–0

35
Shots
21

Canada	3 – 0 (0–0, 2–0, 1–0)	Slovakia	Jack Byrne Arena

Fabio Luongo
Goalies
Stanislav Petrik

C.Chilarducci – 18:22	1–0
M.Stinziani – 21:23	2–0
M.Stinziani – 31:42	3–0

27
Shots
25

Germany	1 – 5 (0–1, 1–2, 0–2)	Greece	Jack Byrne Arena

Maximilian Duerr
Goalies
Alexandros Liakopoulos

	0–1	M.Barbas – 05:47
	0–2	A.Bozinakis – 26:55
28:06 – D.Brendle	1–2
	1–3	G.Nistas (PP) – 29:16
	1–4	C.Stojsin – 30:51
	1–5	K.Kuezmaski – 42:32

14
Shots
31

Canada	9 – 3 (1–1, 6–1, 2–1)	Pakistan	Jack Byrne Arena

Timothy Barlow
Goalies
Ibad Khan
Reza Zaidi

	0–1	05:33 – M.Hamdani
C.Sparkes – 07:04	1–1
	1–2	16:16 – S.Aybi
C.Wild – 16:25	2–2
M.Frechette – 17:26	3–2
E.Peters – 18:28	4–2
M.Frechette – 25:19	5–2
P.Keefe – 26:04	6–2
J.Escott – 28:13	7–2
M.Stoico – 36:58	8–2
	8–3	37:09 – M.Hamdani
J.Escott – 42:21	9–3

39
Shots
20

Germany	7 – 4 (2–0, 2–2, 3–2)	Pakistan	Jack Byrne Arena

Maximilian Duerr
Goalies
Reza Zaidi
Ibad Khan

C.Hagen (PP) – 04:01	1–0
P.Luschenz (PP) – 04:59	2–0
	2–1	17:08 – I.Chaushry
	2–2	24:42 – B.Buttar
D.Brendle – 29:15	3–2
D.Brendle – 29:45	4–2
B.Brozicek – 30:35	5–2
T.Spitzer – 31:07	6–2
	6–3	34:26 – S.Ayubi
	6–4	34:40 – M.Hamdani
B.Cook – 44:32	7–4

28
Shots
35

Slovakia	2 – 1 (1–0, 1–1, 0–0)	Greece	Jack Byrne Arena

Stanislav Petrik
Goalies
Ioannis Vrettis

M.Svitana – 14:35	1–0
	1–1	15:54 – J.Barbas
M.Beniac – 28:12	2–1

28
Shots
21

== Group B ==
Team	Pld	W	D	L	GF	GA	GD	Pts
Portugal	4	3	1	0	21	7	+14	7
Czech Republic	4	3	0	1	31	4	+27	6
United States	4	2	0	2	28	11	+17	4
Switzerland	4	1	1	2	21	16	+5	3
France	4	0	0	4	0	61	−61	0

United States	16 – 0 (8–0, 3–0, 5–0)	France	Jack Byrne Arena

D.Schlegel – 03:19	1–0
T.Hughes – 03:32	2–0
M.Williams – 04:19	3–0
A.Hildreth – 05:13	4–0
A.Hildreth – 05:59	5–0
T.Hughes – 07:08	6–0
J.Merchant – 14:07	7–0
C.Haynes – 14:43	8–0
M.Esposito – 15:38	9–0
A.Hildreth – 22:16	10–0
S.Gregory – 25:58	11–0
J.Petito – 35:52	12–0
N.Carter – 37:05	13–0
T.Caba – 37:18	14–0
R.Zimmick – 38:33	15–0
F.Hunt – 42:12	16–0

57
Shots
4

Czech Republic	4 – 1 (1–0, 0–0, 3–1)	Switzerland	Jack Byrne Arena

D. Hnízdil – 09:38	1–0
D. Hnízdil – 37:49	2–0
M. Krůček – 38:39	3–0
M. Krůček – 40:39	4–0
	4–1	44:38 – A. Faina

34
Shots
19

United States	7 – 1 (3–1, 1–0, 3–0)	Switzerland	Jack Byrne Arena

M.Esposito – 00:41	1–0
	1–1	01:03 – I.Ismael
S.Gregory – 13:37	2–1
R.Zinger – 13:56	3–1
S.Gregory (PP) – 23:03	4–1
T.Hugher – 38:00	5–1
T.Hugher – 38:18	6–1
F.Huntr – 40:16	7–1

43
Shots
29

Portugal	1 – 0 (0–0, 1–0, 0–0)	Czech Republic	Jack Byrne Arena

S.Vidal – 27:40 / 1–0
25	Shots	40

Portugal	10 – 0 (1–0, 7–0, 2–0)	France	Jack Byrne Arena

Sergio Vidal – 14:00	1–0
Sergio Vidal – 19:01	2–0
Jeff Gallant – 19:09	3–0
Matthew Leal (PP) – 19:20	4–0
Brian Carvalho – 22:53	5–0
Jeff Galant – 24:08	6–0
Jeff Gallant – 24:35	7–0
Ricardo Pires – 24:59	8–0
Matthew Leal – 35:00	9–0
Gary Costa – 36:38	10–0

38
Shots
7

Czech Republic	7 – 2 (1–1, 3–1, 3–0)	United States	Jack Byrne Arena

J.Bacovsky – 12:50	1–0
	1–1	13:37 – J.Pinter
D.Tyburec – 21:06	2–1
	2–2	23:45 – F.Hunt
J.Pospisil – 24:15	3–2
J.Bily – 28:29	4–2
T.Wrobel – 31:40	5–2
T.Hak – 33:45	6–2
L.Hudecek – 36:57	7–2

31
Shots
24

Czech Republic	20 – 0 (7–0, 5–0, 8–0)	France	Jack Byrne Arena

J.Bacovsky – 00:47	1–0
T.Wrobel – 01:54	2–0
J.Bacovsky – 05:21	3–0
M.Ruzicka – 06:39	4–0
J.Bacovsky – 09:59	5–0
L.Soukup – 11:56	6–0
J.Bacovsky – 14:56	7–0
R.Soukup – 17:07	8–0
L.Soukup – 20:15	9–0
L.Topolanek – 20:27	10–0
T.Wrobel – 20:45	11–0
O.Kejr – 29:43	12–0
T.Kudela – 30:09	13–0
J.Strecha – 31:30	14–0
J.Bacovsky – 32:02	15–0
M.Krucek – 33:03	16–0
D.Hnizdil – 33:48	17–0
J.Strecha – 35:10	18–0
M.Krucek – 41:18	19–0
M.Prucha – 44:35	20–0

75
Shots
2

Portugal	4 – 4 (0–1, 3–1, 1–2)	Switzerland	Jack Byrne Arena

	0-1	10:02 – P.Merz
	0-2	15:38 – N.Fuchs
P.Cabral – 22:52	1-2
J.Cabral – 24:16	2-2
R. Pires – 25:09	3-2
	3-3	28:19 – L.Henzi
M.Leal – 31:29	4-3
	4-4	40:30 – I.Metroz

21
Shots
32

Switzerland	15 – 0 (3–0, 4–0, 8–0)	France	Jack Byrne Arena

80	Shots	5

Portugal	5 – 3 (2–0, 0–2, 3–1)	United States	Jack Byrne Arena

Paul Lima – 10:30	1-0
Justin Cabral – 11:16	2-0
	2-1	28:58 – Chris Haynes
	2-2	29:57 – Denny Schlegel
	2-3	30:20 – Steve Gregory
Christopher Creador – 31:19	3-3
Matthew Leal – 43:59	4-3
Sergio Vidal – 44:59	5-3

24
Shots
36

== Classification matches (7th–10th) ==
Germany	8 – 3 (3–0, 2–2, 3–1)	France	Jack Byrne Arena

Switzerland	8 – 3 (4–1, 1–1, 3–1)	Pakistan	Jack Byrne Arena

=== 9th place ===
France	3 – 5 (1–0, 1–2, 1–3)	Pakistan	Jack Byrne Arena

=== 7th place ===
Germany	0 – 2 (0–1, 0–1, 0–0)	Switzerland	Jack Byrne Arena

== Playoffs ==
Quarterfinals
2B	Czech Republic	1
3A	Greece	0
2A	Slovakia	6
3B	United States	1

Semifinals
1A	Canada	1
2B	Czech Republic	5
1B	Portugal	3
2A	Slovakia	4

Finals
2A	Slovakia	2
2B	Czech Republic	1
Bronze medal game
1A	Canada	7
1B	Portugal	3

=== Quarterfinal ===
Czech Republic	1 – 0 (0–0, 1–0, 0–0)	Greece	Jack Byrne Arena

O.Kejr – 28:31 / 1–0
40	Shots	16

Slovakia	6 – 1 (1–0, 4–1, 1–0)	United States	Jack Byrne Arena

J.Martinusik (PP) – 01:46	1–0
M.Ladiver – 15:11	2–0
P.Zulko – 16:22	3–0
M.Beniac – 20:07	4–0
	4–1	26:17 – (PP) A.Hildreth
R.Kassa – 29:15	5–1
M.Slovak (PP) – 31:14	6–1

45
Shots
13

=== Semifinal ===
Czech Republic	5 – 1 (2–0, 2–0, 1–1)	Canada	Jack Byrne Arena

Tomáš Hak – 02:25	1–0
Jan Bacovský – 04:09	2–0
Tomáš Kudela – 27:20	3–0
Jan Pospisil – 28:00	4–0
	4–1	36:05 – Terry Ryan
Jan Bacovský – 44:59	5–1

27
Shots
26

Slovakia	4 – 3 (2–1, 1–1, 1–1)	Portugal	Jack Byrne Arena

Robert Kassa – 05:12	1–0
	1–1	07:15 – Ricardo Alberto
Miroslav Behul – 12:02	2–1
Jaroslav Martinusik – 21:54	3–1
	3–2	22:47 – Ricardo Alberto
Boris Oravec – 36:16	4–2
	4–3	44:17 – Christopher Creador

29
Shots
15

=== Bronze medal game ===
Canada	7 – 3 (2–0, 1–2, 4–1)	Portugal	Jack Byrne Arena; Attendance: 1 000

Jonathan Daoust – 06:18	1–0
Chris Sparkes – 09:27	2–0
Mike Stinziani – 19:12	3–0
	3–1	22:09 – Matthew Leal
	3–2	27:16 – Christopher Creador
Martin Frechette – 33:05	4–2
	4–3	33:47 – Dustin Macbeth
Jonathan Daoust – 37:15	5–3
Chris Sparkes – 41:24	6–3
Martin Frechette – 43:03	7–3

22
Shots
8

=== Final ===
Slovakia	2 – 1 (1–0, 1–0, 0–1)	Czech Republic	Jack Byrne Arena; Attendance: 1 100

Game reference

Boris Oravec – 13:04	1–0
Jaroslav Martinusik (PP) – 28:28	2–0
	2–1	38:09 – Tomáš Wrobel

23
Shots
20

== Final standings ==
	Team
1st place, gold medalist(s)	Slovakia
2nd place, silver medalist(s)	Czech Republic
3rd place, bronze medalist(s)	Canada
4th	Portugal
5th	United States
6th	Greece
7th	Switzerland
8th	Germany
9th	Pakistan
10th	France

== B-Pool ==
Team	Pld	W	D	L	GF	GA	GD	Pts
Bermuda	6	5	1	0	28	9	+19	11
Italy	6	3	2	1	17	14	+3	6
Hong Kong	6	3	0	3	14	20	−6	6
Israel	6	2	1	3	16	20	−4	5
Cayman Islands	6	2	1	3	17	15	+2	5
United Kingdom	6	2	0	4	14	19	−5	4
Armenia	6	1	1	4	14	23	−9	3

Promoted to the 2015 A-Pool

Italy	3 – 3 (2–1, 0–1, 1–1)	Israel	Glacier Arena, Mount Pearl

	0-1	06:34 – Roman Price
Alessandro Palermo – 12:48	1-1
Daniel Setacci – 13:15	2-1
	2-2	19:25 – Roman Price
Michael Verelli – 35:55	3-2
	3-3	36:10 – Michael Sinukoff

20
Shots
12

Bermuda	8 – 1 (3–0, 1–0, 4–1)	Hong Kong	Glacier Arena, Mount Pearl

23	Shots	13

Cayman Islands	4 – 1 (3–0, 1–0, 0–1)	United Kingdom	Glacier Arena, Mount Pearl

Ryan Pull – 04:17	1-0
Ryan Pull – 04:41	2-0
Rob Rintoul – 11:10	3-0
Joel Young – 22:38	4-0
	4-1	32:52 – Chris Morisson

17
Shots
19

Bermuda	3 – 1 (0–0, 1–2, 0–1)	Italy	Glacier Arena, Mount Pearl

Matthew Benson – 20:56	1-0
	1-1	21:13 – Dave Divizo
Glen Madore – 27:28	2-1
David Gazzard – 36:52	3-1

21
Shots
22

Hong Kong	2 – 1 (2–1, 0–0, 0–0)	Israel	Glacier Arena, Mount Pearl

	0-1	04:56 – Roman Price
Jordan So – 11:38	1-1
Tony Lam – 14:29	2-1

37
Shots
20

United Kingdom	6 – 1 (1–0, 4–1, 1–0)	Armenia	Glacier Arena, Mount Pearl

31	Shots	18

Cayman Islands	4 – 1 (2–0, 1–1, 1–0)	Armenia	Glacier Arena, Mount Pearl

26	Shots	21

Hong Kong	3 – 4 (1–1, 1–2, 1–1)	Italy	Glacier Arena, Mount Pearl

26	Shots	32

Bermuda	5 – 1 (1–1, 1–2, 1–1)	Israel	Glacier Arena, Mount Pearl

30	Shots	20

Israel	2 – 4 (0–1, 1–2, 1–1)	Armenia	Glacier Arena, Mount Pearl

32	Shots	27

Bermuda	4 – 2 (0–1, 2–1, 2–0)	Cayman Islands	Glacier Arena, Mount Pearl

43	Shots	15

United Kingdom	0 – 3 (0–1, 0–1, 0–1)	Italy	Glacier Arena, Mount Pearl

25	Shots	29

Italy	3 – 3 (1–1, 0–2, 2–0)	Cayman Islands	Glacier Arena, Mount Pearl

25	Shots	22

United Kingdom	0 – 4 (0–1, 0–1, 0–2)	Bermuda	Glacier Arena, Mount Pearl

26	Shots	26

Hong Kong	4 – 2 (0–1, 2–1, 2–0)	Armenia	Glacier Arena, Mount Pearl

35	Shots	36

Israel	4 – 2 (0–1, 3–1, 1–0)	United Kingdom	Glacier Arena, Mount Pearl

19	Shots	29

Cayman Islands	0 – 1 (0–0, 0–0, 0–1)	Hong Kong	Glacier Arena, Mount Pearl

21	Shots	26

Bermuda	4 – 4 (1–1, 2–1, 1–2)	Armenia	Glacier Arena, Mount Pearl

27	Shots	23

Italy	3 – 2 (1–1, 0–1, 2–0)	Armenia	Glacier Arena, Mount Pearl

30	Shots	14

Cayman Islands	4 – 5 (4–1, 0–2, 0–2)	Israel	Glacier Arena, Mount Pearl

19	Shots	16

United Kingdom	5 – 3 (2–1, 1–2, 2–0)	Hong Kong	Glacier Arena, Mount Pearl

24	Shots	18
