= Stanislav Petrík =

Slovak ice hockey player

- Born: 4 August 1977 (age 49)
- Height: 5 ft 10 in (178 cm)
- Position: Goaltender
- Slovak Extraliga team: HC Slovan Bratislava

Stanislav Petrík (born 4 August 1977) is a Slovak former professional ice hockey player who played with HC Slovan Bratislava in the Slovak Extraliga.
