= Greece men's national ball hockey team =

Greece
- Nickname: Greece
- Association: Hellenic Ball Hockey Association (HBHA)
- Head coach: George Vouloumanos
- Captain: Joshua Barbas

Biggest win
- Greece 13 - 0 Hongkong (Hong Kong) (Plzeň, Czech Republic, 2009)

Biggest defeat
- Slovakia 10 - 1 Greece (Plzeň, Czech Republic, 2009)

Ball Hockey World Championship
- Appearances: 10 (first in 2005)
- Best result: 4th (2015, 2017, 2022)

The Greece national ball hockey team has been representing Greece in the Ball Hockey World Championship since 2005. Is member of the International Street and Ball Hockey Federation (ISBHF).

== World Championship ==
Year	Location	Result
2005	Pittsburgh, United States	11th place
2007	Ratingen, Germany	15th place
2009	Plzeň, Czech Republic	9th place
2011	Bratislava, Slovakia	6th place
2013	St.John's, Canada	6th place
2015	Zug, Switzerland	4th place
2017	Pardubice, Czech Republic	4th place
2019	Košice, Slovakia	8th place
2022	Laval, Canada	4th place
2024	Visp, Switzerland	6th place
