= Justin Pender =

Canadian ice hockey player (born 1988)

- Born: October 25, 1988 (age 36); St. John's, Newfoundland, Canada
- Height: 6 ft 4 in (193 cm)
- Weight: 212 lb (96 kg; 15 st 2 lb)
- Position: Defence
- Shoots: Left
- ECHL team Former teams: Bakersfield Condors; Lowell Devils; Trenton Devils; Toledo Walleye
- NHL draft: Undrafted
- Playing career: 2009–present

Justin Pender (born October 25, 1988) is a Canadian professional ice hockey defenceman who made it as far as the ECHL. He is currently playing for the Clarenville Caribou's of the Central West Senior Hockey League in Newfoundland & Labrador.

Prior to turning professional, Pender played major junior hockey in the Quebec Major Junior Hockey League with the Halifax Mooseheads.

On November 15, 2011, the Bakersfield Condors claimed Pender off waivers after he was let go by the Toledo Walleye.

On January 28, 2017 Pender was suspended from regular season play for hitting a referee in the head with a water bottle during a game against the Grand Falls Cataracts
