= Canada men's national ball hockey team =

Canada
- Nickname: Canada
- Association: Canadian Ball Hockey Association (CBHA)
- General manager: Daniel Medeiros
- Head coach: Ian Moores
- Assistants: Alex Bovoletis

Biggest win
- Canada 21 - 1 Great Britain (United Kingdom) (Plzeň, Czech Republic June 14, 2009)

Biggest defeat
- Czech Republic 5 - 1 Canada (St.John's, Canada June 8, 2013)

Ball Hockey World Championship
- Appearances: 15 (first in 1996)
- Best result: 1st (1996, 2001, 2003, 2005, 2007, 2022, 2024)

Canada men's national ball hockey team
Medal record

World Championships
Gold medal – first place	1996 Slovakia	Team
Gold medal – first place	2001 Canada	Team
Gold medal – first place	2003 Switzerland	Team
Gold medal – first place	2005 United States	Team
Gold medal – first place	2007 Germany	Team
Gold medal – first place	2022 Canada	Team
Gold medal – first place	2024 Switzerland	Team
Silver medal – second place	1999 Slovakia	Team
Silver medal – second place	2011 Slovakia	Team
Silver medal – second place	2017 Czech Republic	Team
Bronze medal – third place	1998 Czech Republic	Team
Bronze medal – third place	2013 Canada	Team
Bronze medal – third place	2019 Slovakia	Team

The Canada men's national ball hockey team is the men's national ball hockey team of Canada, and a member of the International Street and Ball Hockey Federation (ISBHF).

== World Championships ==
Year	Location	Result
1996	Bratislava, Slovakia	Gold
1998	Litoměřice, Czech Republic	Bronze
1999	Zvolen, Slovakia	Silver
2001	Toronto, Canada	Gold
2003	Sierra, Switzerland	Gold
2005	Pittsburgh, USA	Gold
2007	Ratingen, Germany	Gold
2009	Plzeň, Czech Republic	5th place
2011	Bratislava, Slovakia	Silver
2013	St.John's, Canada	Bronze
2015	Zug, Switzerland	5th place
2017	Pardubice, Czech Republic	Silver
2019	Košice, Slovakia	Bronze
2022	Laval, Canada	Gold
2024	Visp, Switzerland	Gold
2026	Ostrava, Czech Republic	4th place

== All-time World Championship records ==
Year	GP	W	D	L	GF	GA	+/-
(Slovakia) 1996	8	6	1	1	63	16	+47
(Czech Republic) 1998	5	3	1	1	18	10	+8
(Slovakia) 1999	5	4	0	1	36	7	+29
(Canada) 2001	5	5	0	0	33	3	+30
(Switzerland) 2003	7	7	0	0	53	6	+47
(United States) 2005	6	5	0	1	26	9	+17
(Germany) 2007	6	6	0	0	40	5	+35
(Czech Republic) 2009	6	5	0	1	47	10	+37
(Slovakia) 2011	6	4	1	1	36	18	+18
(Canada) 2013	6	5	0	1	34	13	+21
(Switzerland) 2015	7	4	1	2	43	19	+24
Totals	67	54	4	9	429	116	+313
