= Tomáš Škvaridlo =

Slovak ice hockey player

- Born: June 19, 1981 (age 44) Zvolen, Czechoslovakia
- Height: 6 ft 2 in (188 cm)
- Weight: 209 lb (95 kg; 14 st 13 lb)
- Position: Left wing
- Shoots: Left
- Slovak Extraliga team Former teams: HKm Zvolen; MsHK Žilina; HC ’05 Banská Bystrica; Rapaces de Gap
- NHL draft: 144th overall, 1999; Pittsburgh Penguins
- Playing career: 2001–present

Tomáš Škvaridlo (born June 19, 1981) is a Slovak professional ice hockey player currently playing for HKm Zvolen in the Slovak Extraliga. He was drafted 144th overall by the Pittsburgh Penguins in the 1999 NHL entry draft.

== Career statistics ==
			Regular season					Playoffs
Season	Team	League	GP	G	A	Pts	PIM	GP	G	A	Pts	PIM
1998–99	HKm Zvolen	Slovak	1	0	0	0	0	—	—	—	—	—
1998–99	HKm Zvolen 2	Slovak2	9	1	1	2	22	—	—	—	—	—
1999–00	Kingston Frontenacs	OHL	66	19	25	44	14	5	0	0	0	2
2000–01	Kingston Frontenacs	OHL	58	10	19	29	33	4	2	0	2	6
2001–02	MsHK Zilina	Slovak	35	2	1	3	8	—	—	—	—	—
2001–02	Hokej Šumperk 2003	Czech2	3	0	0	0	2	—	—	—	—	—
2003–04	HKm Zvolen	Slovak	47	7	8	15	14	—	—	—	—	—
2004–05	HKm Zvolen	Slovak	39	10	5	15	20	13	0	1	1	4
2005–06	HKm Zvolen	Slovak	46	6	3	9	42	4	0	0	0	2
2005–06	HC Banska Bystrica	Slovak2	—	—	—	—	—	3	0	2	2	2
2006–07	HKm Zvolen	Slovak	53	12	6	18	57	5	0	0	0	0
2007–08	MsHK Zilina	Slovak	19	2	1	3	14	—	—	—	—	—
2007–08	HC Banska Bystrica	Slovak2	11	6	0	6	12	14	5	3	8	24
2008–09	HC Banska Bystrica	Slovak	49	6	12	18	57	5	0	0	0	0
2009–10	Rapaces de Gap	France	23	6	7	13	43	2	2	1	3	0
2010–11	HK Detva	Slovak2	20	11	6	17	30	7	3	3	6	8
2010–11	HKm Zvolen	Slovak	1	1	0	1	0	—	—	—	—	—
2011–12	HKm Zvolen	Slovak	44	8	15	23	20	—	—	—	—	—
2012–13	HKm Zvolen	Slovak	50	20	16	36	44	17	2	5	7	12
2013–14	HKm Zvolen	Slovak	48	8	11	19	57	4	1	0	1	2
2014–15	HKm Zvolen	Slovak	54	11	13	24	28	7	2	0	2	2
2015–16	HKm Zvolen	Slovak	50	12	13	25	26	11	1	0	1	4
Slovak totals			536	105	104	209	358	75	6	9	15	36
