= Pakistan national ball hockey team =

Pakistan sports team

The Pakistan national ball hockey team, managed by the Pakistan Street and Ball Hockey Federation, has seen consistent growth over the years. The team achieved significant success by winning two gold medals in Pool B in 2007 and 2011. In recognition of its progress, Pakistan was elevated to Pool A status in 2013.

== Awards and honors ==
Gold Medals

- 2011 - Team Pakistan - B-Pool (Slovakia)
- 2007 - Team Pakistan - B-Pool (Germany)

Tournament MVP

- 2011 - Ijaz Chaudhry - Slovakia

All Star Team

- 2011 - Bilal Buttar - Slovakia

Goaltender of the Tournament

- 2011 - Raza Zaidi - Slovakia

== 2013 Roster ==
Coaching Staff

- Christopher Pinto — Head Coach
- Naiem Malik — Assistant Coach
- Ali Wadee — Player Development
- Brian Lucas — Player Development
- Joe Lucas — Player Development

Executives

- Naveed Mohammad — General Manager
- Safi Habib — Media/PR Director
- Muhammad Afzal Javed — Pakistan General Secretary/Player Development

Goaltenders

- Raza Zaidi
- Ibad Khan

Defencemen

- Ijaz Chaudhry
- Bilal Buttar
- Zafir Rashid
- Farooq Khan
- Mustafa Alam
- Yusuf Azmi
- Salih Azmi
- Fahad Mallik

Forwards

- Sajjid Ayubi
- Usama Mahmood
- Imran Patel
- Osman Buttar
- Teepu Kidwai
- Munawar Hamdani
- Omar Sabri
- Shane Khan
- Safi Ahmed
- Mohammed Bilal
- Sophian Mian
- Nazir Lasania
- Shaukat Khan
- Camran Baig
- Waqas Khan
