= 2001 Ball Hockey World Championship =

The 2001 Ball Hockey World Championship was the fourth ball hockey world championship held by ISBHF in Toronto, Canada. Canada won their second title.

== Group A ==
Team	Pld	W	T	L	GF	GA	GD	Pts
Slovakia	3	3	0	0	32	3	+29	6
Switzerland	3	2	0	1	11	12	−1	4
Bermuda	3	1	0	2	8	13	−5	2
United States	3	0	0	3	4	27	−23	0

Switzerland	4–2	United States

Slovakia	7–0	Bermuda

Switzerland	4–3	Bermuda

Slovakia	18–0	United States

Slovakia	7–3	Switzerland

Bermuda	5–2	United States

== Group B ==
Team	Pld	W	L	T	GF	GA	GD	Pts
Canada	3	3	0	0	23	0	+23	6
Czech Republic	3	2	1	0	14	6	+8	4
Germany	3	0	2	1	8	16	−8	1
Austria	3	0	2	1	7	30	−23	1

Czech Republic	3–2	Germany

Canada	13–0	Austria

Czech Republic	11–1	Austria

Canada	7–0	Germany

Austria	6–6	Germany

Canada	3–0	Czech Republic

== Play off ==
Semifinals
B2	Czech Republic	2
A1	Slovakia	1
B1	Canada	6
A2	Switzerland	0

Finals
B1	Canada	4
B2	Czech Republic	3

=== Semifinals ===
Czech Republic	2–1	Slovakia

Canada	6–0	Switzerland

=== Bronze medal game ===
Slovakia	4–0	Switzerland

=== Final ===
Canada	4–3	Czech Republic

Rank	Country
1st place, gold medalist(s)	Canada
2nd place, silver medalist(s)	Czech Republic
3rd place, bronze medalist(s)	Slovakia
4	Switzerland
5	Bermuda
6	Germany
7	Austria
8	United States
