= Ball hockey =

Ball and stick team sport

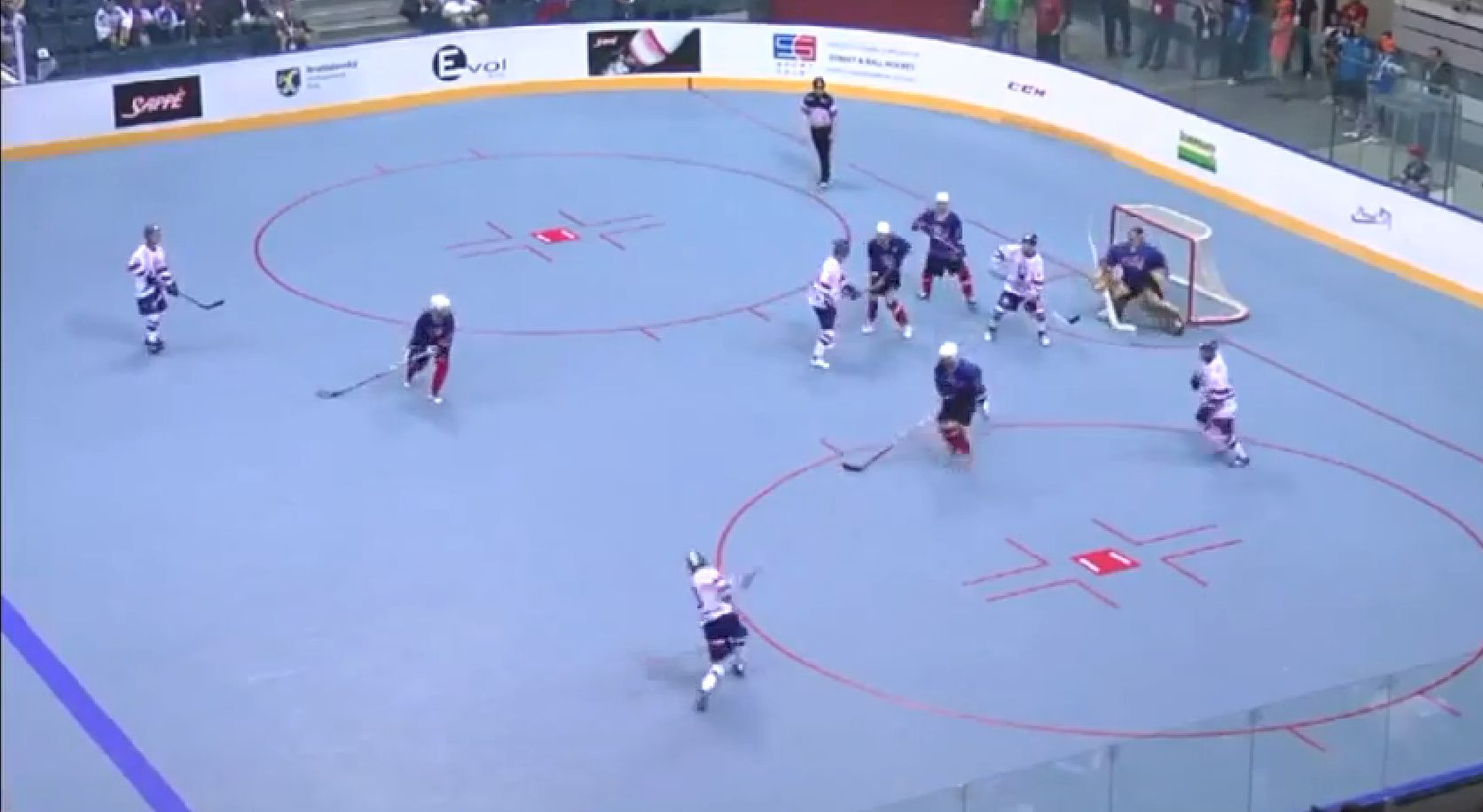
- Ball hockey game between USA (Blue) and Slovakia (White) at 2011 World Ball Hockey Championship.
- Highest governing body: International Street and Ball Hockey Federation (International) USA Ball Hockey (United States); Canadian Ball Hockey Association (Canada)
- Nicknames: Street Hockey, US = dek hockey, some places in Canada call it "road" hockey

Characteristics
- Type: Both indoor and outdoor
- Equipment: Required = A ball, a hockey stick, a net. Optional in pickup but mandatory in leagues= shin pads, gloves. Optional everywhere for adults, mandatory for kids in leagues = helmet.

Ball hockey is a variant of floor hockey and street hockey, and more specifically, an off-ice variant of ice hockey.

Ball hockey is patterned after and closely related to ice hockey, except the game is played on foot on a non-ice surface, player equipment is different, and an orange ball is used instead of a hockey puck. The objective of the game is to score more goals than the opposing team by shooting the ball into the opposing team's net.

== Gameplay ==
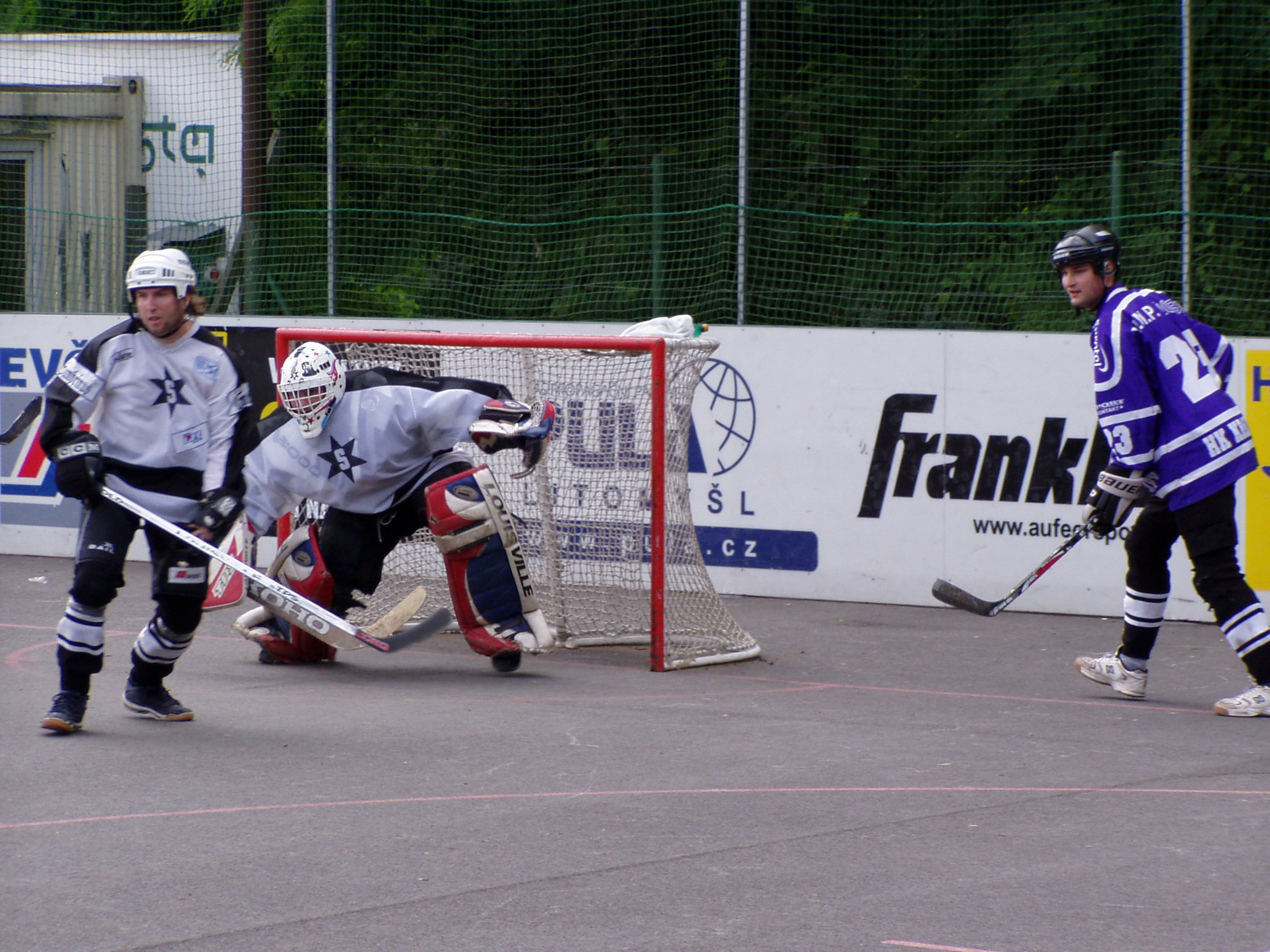
A Ball hockey game

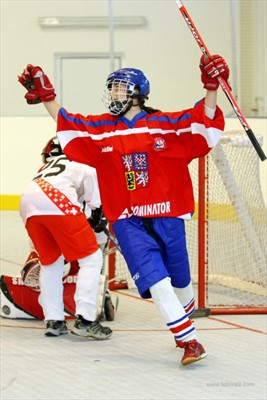
Women's Ball hockey game

Teams consist of five runners and one goaltender. The five runners are broken down into positions of three forwards and two defense-men, right and left. The forwards are further described by position name: Left Wing, Right Wing, and Center. These positions are the same as in ice hockey. Tournament Ball Hockey rules are numerous and extensive, so shall not be listed in this article. A list of the official ball hockey tournament rules of the ISBHF can be found online. For general information's sake, Ball Hockey rules typically stipulate the following basics which means that when one is playing under these rules, then Ball Hockey is being played:

- Offside is determined by a "floating blue line". The concept can be difficult to understand for non-hockey enthusiasts, but the simplest explanation is as follows: When the ball crosses the defending team's blue line, the attacking team is onside. The attacking team then has the entire zone up to the center line with which to work the ball around and still be considered onside. Once the ball crosses the center red line the attacking zone is "lost", and the attacking team's players must clear (retreat past) the defending team's blue line and have the ball enter past the defending team's blue line to be considered onside again.

== Equipment ==
The ball used is a specially designed one for ball hockey and street hockey.

In most non-international tournaments, the following equipment requirements are instituted for the runners:

- Helmets are mandatory for players.
- Some type of hand gloves must be worn, and they do not have to be hockey gloves but they can not have strings lose. Specific gloves for the sport of ball hockey have been developed and are manufactured and sold to ball hockey players.
- Some type of shin guards must be worn, and they do not have to be hockey shin guards. Specific guards for the sport of ball hockey have been developed and are manufactured and sold to ball hockey players.
- Teams must have matching jerseys with numbers. These can often be T-shirts with numbers on them.
- Appropriate footwear for running.
- Some type of official hockey stick

Specific helmets, shin guards, and gloves for the sport of ball hockey have been developed and are manufactured and sold to ball hockey players, but it is not mandatory for players to wear these for all The following equipment requirements are instituted for goaltenders:

- Goaltender's helmet with full face mask
- Chest protector
- Thigh pads
- Goaltender leg pads
- Goaltender Glove or trapper
- Goaltender Blocker
- Goaltender Stick
- Shirt that fits over all chest equipment
- Appropriate footwear

For official international tournaments, the ISBHF rules apply, and players must wear protective equipment as stipulated in their rule book.

== Governing bodies ==
=== International ===
The official worldwide governing body of the sport is the International Street and Ball Hockey Federation (ISBHF), which operates out of the Czech Republic, and officially recognized by the International Ice Hockey Federation (IIHF). The federation consists of 41 countries as of 2026 and recognizes hundreds of thousands of players playing in organized leagues throughout the world.

=== Canada ===
The Canadian Ball Hockey Association is recognized as the governing body of the sport of ball hockey in Canada.

=== United States ===
The governing body for ball hockey is USA Ball Hockey. There is one officially sanctioned league operating in the United States, the National Ball Hockey League (Players, however, are not paid for playing in this league. Teams are allowed to secure sponsorships that cover any costs for players jerseys, equipment and entry fees for the season).

=== Europe and Asia ===
Several European and Asian countries have their own governing bodies where the sport has enough players to have a national following and presence.

== History ==
In North America, Natives were first observed playing a variant of the game in 1572. In the 1960s Canada became the first nation to play the sport in organized leagues, followed by the United States the next decade, then countries in Europe in the 1980s and 1990s.

== See also ==
- Cosom hockey
- Floor hockey
- Field hockey
- Ice hockey
- Yeshiva League
