= Tiba =

Tiba may refer to:

== People ==
=== Nickname ===
- Tiba (footballer), Arione Ferreira Guedes (born 1968), Brazilian football striker

=== Given name ===
- Tiba al-Ali (died 2023), Iraqi YouTuber
- Tiba Al-Quraishi (born 1996), Iraqi football and futsal player
- Tiba Tomaj, Hungarian noble

=== Surname ===
- Içami Tiba, Brazilian psychiatrist and writer
- István Tiba, Hungarian dentist and politician
- Tara Tiba, Iranian-Australian singer
- Zsuzsanna Tiba (born 1976), Hungarian water polo player

== Places ==
- Tiba, Burkina Faso, a town
- Chiba Prefecture, a prefecture of Japan
  - Chiba, Chiba, capital city of the prefecture

== Other uses ==
- Tiba (instrument), a wind instrument used in Switzerland
- Tiba language, spoken in Nigeria
- Polar auxin transport inhibitor 2,3,5-triiodobenzoic acid
- Saipa Tiba, an Iranian car made by Saipa

== See also ==
- Taybeh (disambiguation)
