= 2026 Ball Hockey World Championship =

Ball hockey competition in Czech Republic

2026 Ball Hockey World Championships

Tournament details
- Host country: Czech Republic
- City: Ostrava
- Venues: 2 (in 1 host city)
- Dates: 20 – 28 June 2026
- Teams: 18

Final positions
- Champions: United States (1st title)
- Runners-up: Czech Republic
- Third place: Finland
- Fourth place: Canada

The 2026 Ball Hockey World Championship (Czech: Mistrovství světa v hokejbalu mužů a žen 2026) was the sixteenth edition of the Men's Ball Hockey World Championship. It was organized by the International Street and Ball Hockey Federation (ISBHF), the championships were hosted in Ostrava, Czech Republic from 20 to 28 June 2026.

== Venues ==
Ostrava
Ostravar Aréna Capacity: 10,004	Multifunkční hala (Multifunctional Arena) Capacity: 502
Exterior of Ostravar Aréna	Interior of Multifunkční hala

== Preliminary round ==
=== Group A ===
Team	Pld	W	OTW	OTL	L	GF	GA	GD	Pts	Qualification
Czech Republic	5	5	0	0	0	30	14	+16	10	Quarterfinals
Canada	5	4	0	0	1	24	11	+13	8	Quarterfinals
Slovakia	5	3	0	1	1	16	11	+5	7	Quarterfinals
United States	5	2	0	0	3	10	10	0	4	Quarterfinals
Switzerland	5	1	0	0	4	11	22	−11	2	Quarterfinals
Finland	5	0	0	0	5	10	33	−23	0	Quarterfinals

20 June 2026; 12:00	Switzerland	1–3 (1-0, 0-3, 0-0)	Slovakia	Ostravar Aréna, Ostrava; Attendance: 847

20 June 2026; 15:00	Czech Republic	8–6 (1-1, 3-2, 4-3)	Finland	Ostravar Aréna, Ostrava; Attendance: 3526

20 June 2026; 20:00	United States	1–5 (1-2, 0-2, 0-1)	Canada	Ostravar Aréna, Ostrava; Attendance: 493

21 June 2026; 13:00	Slovakia	4–0 (3-0, 0-0, 1-0)	United States	Ostravar Aréna, Ostrava; Attendance: 849

21 June 2026; 15:45	Canada	3–6 (1-1, 1-2, 1-3)	Czech Republic	Ostravar Aréna, Ostrava

21 June 2026; 20:30	Finland	1–6 (0-4, 1-1, 0-1)	Switzerland	Ostravar Aréna, Ostrava; Attendance: 273

22 June 2026; 13:00	United States	8–0 (2-0, 3-0, 3-0)	Finland	Ostravar Aréna, Ostrava; Attendance: 75

22 June 2026; 15:15	Canada	5–2 (0-1, 1-0, 4-1)	Slovakia	Ostravar Aréna, Ostrava; Attendance: 1022

22 June 2026; 17:30	Switzerland	3–12 (1-1, 2-5, 0-6)	Czech Republic	Ostravar Aréna, Ostrava; Attendance: 700

23 June 2026; 13:00	Finland	1–6 (0-2, 0-3, 1-1)	Canada	Ostravar Aréna, Ostrava; Attendance: 268

23 June 2026; 18:15	Czech Republic	3–2 OT (0-1, 1-0, 1-1) (OT: 1-0)	Slovakia	Ostravar Aréna, Ostrava; Attendance: 2732

23 June 2026; 20:30	Switzerland	0–1 (0-1, 0-0, 0-0)	United States	Ostravar Aréna, Ostrava; Attendance: 167

24 June 2026; 15:15	Canada	5–1 (2-1, 2-0, 1-0)	Switzerland	Ostravar Aréna, Ostrava; Attendance: 296

24 June 2026; 17:30	Czech Republic	1–0 (0-0, 0-0, 1-0)	United States	Ostravar Aréna, Ostrava; Attendance: 2762

24 June 2026; 20:00	Slovakia	5–2 (1-0, 2-1, 2-1)	Finland	Ostravar Aréna, Ostrava; Attendance: 110

=== Group B ===
Team	Pld	W	OTW	OTL	L	GF	GA	GD	Pts	Qualification
India	5	5	0	0	0	41	9	+32	10	Quarterfinals
(United Kingdom) Great Britain	5	4	0	0	1	31	18	+13	8	Quarterfinals
Austria	5	2	0	1	2	23	19	+4	5	
France	5	1	2	0	2	17	17	0	6	
Cayman Islands	5	1	0	1	3	16	23	−7	3	
Germany	5	0	0	0	5	5	47	−42	0	

20 June 2026; 09:00	France	6–1 (2-0, 2-0, 2-1)	Germany	Ostravar Aréna, Ostrava; Attendance: 173

20 June 2026; 09:30	Cayman Islands	3–7 (0-2, 2-2, 1-3)	(United Kingdom) Great Britain	Ostravar Aréna, Ostrava; Attendance: 218

20 June 2026; 11:30	Austria	2–7 (1-2, 1-4, 0-1)	India	Ostravar Aréna, Ostrava; Attendance: 167

21 June 2026; 09:00	Great Britain (United Kingdom)	6–3 (1-1, 2-2, 3-0)	Austria	Ostravar Aréna, Ostrava; Attendance: 161

21 June 2026; 11:15	Germany	0–7 (0-2, 0-2, 0-3)	Cayman Islands	Ostravar Aréna, Ostrava; Attendance: 169

21 June 2026; 13:30	India	6–2 (1-0, 2-1, 3-1)	France	Ostravar Aréna, Ostrava; Attendance: 203

22 June 2026; 08:30	Cayman Islands	2–6 (1-2, 1-2, 0-2)	India	Ostravar Aréna, Ostrava; Attendance: 356

22 June 2026; 10:30	Austria	2–3 OT (1-1, 1-1, 0-0) (OT: 0-1)	France	Ostravar Aréna, Ostrava; Attendance: 239

22 June 2026; 12:45	Great Britain (United Kingdom)	10–2 (5-0, 3-1, 2-1)	Germany	Ostravar Aréna, Ostrava; Attendance: 59

23 June 2026; 08:30	Germany	1–9 (0-2, 0-3, 1-4)	Austria	Ostravar Aréna, Ostrava; Attendance: 241

23 June 2026; 13:30	France	3–2 OT (0-2, 1-0, 1-0) (OT: 1-0)	Cayman Islands	Ostravar Aréna, Ostrava; Attendance: 134

23 June 2026; 15:45	India	7–2 (1-0, 4-2, 2-0)	(United Kingdom) Great Britain	Ostravar Aréna, Ostrava; Attendance: 341

24 June 2026; 08:30	France	3–6 (1-1, 1-3, 1-2)	(United Kingdom) Great Britain	Ostravar Aréna, Ostrava; Attendance: 1230

24 June 2026; 13:30	Cayman Islands	2–7 (0-3, 0-2, 2-2)	Austria	Ostravar Aréna, Ostrava; Attendance: 59

24 June 2026; 15:45	Germany	1–15 (0-3, 1-6, 0-6)	India	Ostravar Aréna, Ostrava; Attendance: 137

== Placement round ==
=== Classification 11th–12th place ===
26 June 2026; 10:00	France	4–2 (0-1, 2-0, 2-1)	Germany	Ostravar Aréna, Ostrava; Attendance: 77

26 June 2026; 15:00	Austria	7–4 (2-2, 3-2, 2-0)	Cayman Islands	Ostravar Aréna, Ostrava; Attendance: 48

=== Ninth place game ===
28 June 2026; 09:00	Great Britain (United Kingdom)	9–3 (2-2, 3-0, 4-1)	Austria	Ostravar Aréna, Ostrava; Attendance: 87

=== Seventh place game ===
28 June 2026; 09:15	India	7–2 (2-0, 5-2, 0-0)	France	Ostravar Aréna, Ostrava; Attendance: 200

=== Fifth place game ===
27 June 2026; 09:15	Slovakia	2–3 OT (0-0, 1-0, 1-2) (OT: 0-1)	Switzerland	Ostravar Aréna, Ostrava; Attendance: 1125

=== Playoffs ===
==== Bracket ====
Quarterfinals
26 June
Canada	9
India	1
United States	5
Switzerland	1
Czech Republic	15
(United Kingdom) Great Britain	1
Slovakia	4
Finland	5 OT

Semifinals
27 June
Canada	3
United States	4
Czech Republic	8
Finland	1

Final
27 June
United States	2 OT
Czech Republic	1
Third place
Canada	3
Finland	4

==== Quarterfinals ====
26 June 2026; 08:00	Canada	9–1 (5-0, 4-0, 0-1)	India	Ostravar Aréna, Ostrava; Attendance: 102

26 June 2026; 10:15	Slovakia	4–5 OT (2-1, 1-2, 1-1) (OT: 0-1)	Finland	Ostravar Aréna, Ostrava; Attendance: 250

26 June 2026; 12:45	United States	5–1 (1-0, 0-1, 4-0)	Switzerland	Ostravar Aréna, Ostrava; Attendance: 926

26 June 2026; 17:45	Czech Republic	15–1 (2-1, 10-0, 3-0)	(United Kingdom) Great Britain	Ostravar Aréna, Ostrava; Attendance: 3843

==== Semifinals ====
27 June 2026; 12:00	Canada	3–4 (1-1, 0-3, 2-0)	United States	Ostravar Aréna, Ostrava; Attendance: 1398

27 June 2026; 14:30	Czech Republic	8–1 (2-1, 4-0, 2-0)	Finland	Ostravar Aréna, Ostrava; Attendance: 3500

==== Bronze medal game ====
28 June 2026; 12:15	Canada	3–4 (0-2, 1-0, 2-2)	Finland	Ostravar Aréna, Ostrava; Attendance: 3621

==== Final ====
28 June 2026; 15:15	Czech Republic	1–2 OT (0-0, 1-1, 0-0) (OT: 0-1)	United States	Ostravar Aréna, Ostrava; Attendance: 5689

== Final standings ==
Rank	Country
Group A
1st place, gold medalist(s)	United States
2nd place, silver medalist(s)	Czech Republic
3rd place, bronze medalist(s)	Finland
4	Canada
5	Switzerland
6	Slovakia
Group B
7	India
8	France
9	(United Kingdom) Great Britain
10	Austria
11	Cayman Islands
12	Germany

== See also ==
- 2026 Women's Ball Hockey World Championship
