= Tozacatl =

The tozacatl was an indigenous pre-Columbian Mesoamerican musical instrument, a type of "sounding cane". An 1884 work described the instrument as "a long cane, bent round like an Alpine horn."
