= Largue =

Largue may refer to:

- Largue, Aberdeenshire, a village in Scotland
- Largue, Burkina Faso, a village in Burkina Faso
- Largue (Alpes-de-Haute-Provence), a tributary of the Durance in southeastern France
- Largue (Haut-Rhin), a tributary of the Ill (France), a river in northeastern France
