= United States men's national ball hockey team =

United States
- Nickname: United States
- Association: USA Ball Hockey
- Head coach: Cory Herschk
- Captain: Jonny Ruiz

Biggest win
- United States 13 - 0 Latvia (Sierra, Switzerland June 11, 2003)

Biggest defeat
- Slovakia 18 - 0 United States (Toronto, Canada June 7, 2001)

World Championship
- Appearances: 14 (first in 1998)
- Best result: Gold (2026)

United States men's national ball hockey team
Medal record

World Championship
Gold medal – first place	2026 Ostrava	Team
Silver medal – second place	2015 Zug	Team
Bronze medal – third place	2022 Laval	Team
Bronze medal – third place	2024 Visp - Raron	Team

The United States national ball hockey team has been representing United States in the Ball Hockey World Championship since 1998. Is member of the International Street and Ball Hockey Federation (ISBHF).

== World Championship ==
Year	Location	Result	Position	GP	W	OTW	OTL	L	GF	GA
(Czech Republic) 1998	Litoměřice	Semifinals	4th place	—N/a						
(Canada) 2001	Toronto	Group stage	8th place	3	0	0	0	3	4	27
(Switzerland) 2003	Sierra	Group stage	8th place	—N/a						
(United States) 2005	Pittsburgh	Group stage	9th place	—N/a						
(Germany) 2007	Ratingen	Group stage	10th place	—N/a						
(Czech Republic) 2009	Plzeň	Semifinals	4th place	7	3	1	0	3	44	21
(Slovakia) 2011	Bratislava	Semifinals	4th place	7	3	0	0	4	32	28
(Canada) 2013	St.John's	Quarterfinals	5th place	5	2	0	0	3	29	17
(Switzerland) 2015	Zug	Runners-up	2nd place, silver medalist(s)	—N/a						
(Czech Republic) 2017	Pardubice	Quarterfinals	5th place	7	5	1	1	0	32	17
(Slovakia) 2019	Košice	Quarterfinals	7th place	8	3	0	2	3	42	23
(Canada) 2022	Laval, Quebec	Third Place	3rd place, bronze medalist(s)	7	4	0	1	2	39	25
(Switzerland) 2024	Visp	Third Place	3rd place, bronze medalist(s)	7	4	1	0	2	25	28
(Czech Republic) 2026	Ostrava	Champions	1st place, gold medalist(s)	8	4	1	0	3	21	15
Total		1 Title	14/14	—N/a						
