= Germany men's national ball hockey team =

German national sports team

Germany
- Nickname: Germany
- Association: DSBHB e.V.

Biggest win
- Germany 14 – 1 Mexico (Pittsburgh, United States June, 2005)

Biggest defeat
- Czech Republic 11 – 0 Germany (Sierre, Switzerland June, 2003)

Ball Hockey World Championship
- Appearances: 9 (first in 1996)
- Best result: 4th (1996)

The German men's national ball hockey team is the men's national ball hockey team of Germany, and a member of the International Street and Ball Hockey Federation (ISBHF). Ball hockey, which is also known as street hockey or dek hockey, is similar to ice hockey and uses a ball instead of a puck. In addition to a national team, Germany has several leagues, including the recreational league Berlin Street Hockey.

== World Championships ==
| Year | Location | Result |
|---|---|---|
| 1996 | Bratislava, Slovakia | 4th place |
| 1998 | Litoměřice, Czech Republic | 6th place |
| 1999 | Zvolen, Slovakia | 5th place |
| 2001 | Toronto, Canada | 6th place |
| 2003 | Sierre, Switzerland | 7th place |
| 2005 | Pittsburgh, United States | 10th place |
| 2007 | Ratingen, Germany | 11th place |
| 2011 | Bratislava, Slovakia | 8th place |
| 2013 | St.John's, Canada | 8th place |
