= Bourzoaga =

Coordinates: 11°12′N 0°10′W

- Interactive map of Bourzoaga
- Country: Burkina Faso
- Region: Centre-Est Region
- Province: Boulgou Province
- Department: Bittou Department

Population (2019)
  - Total: 164

Bourzoaga is a small village in the Bittou Department of Boulgou Province in south-eastern Burkina Faso.

Population
| Year | Pop. | ±% |
|---|---|---|
| 1985 | 223 | — |
| 2006 | 38 | −83.0% |
| 2019 | 164 | +331.6% |
