= Lac de Géronde =

Lake in Valais, Switzerland

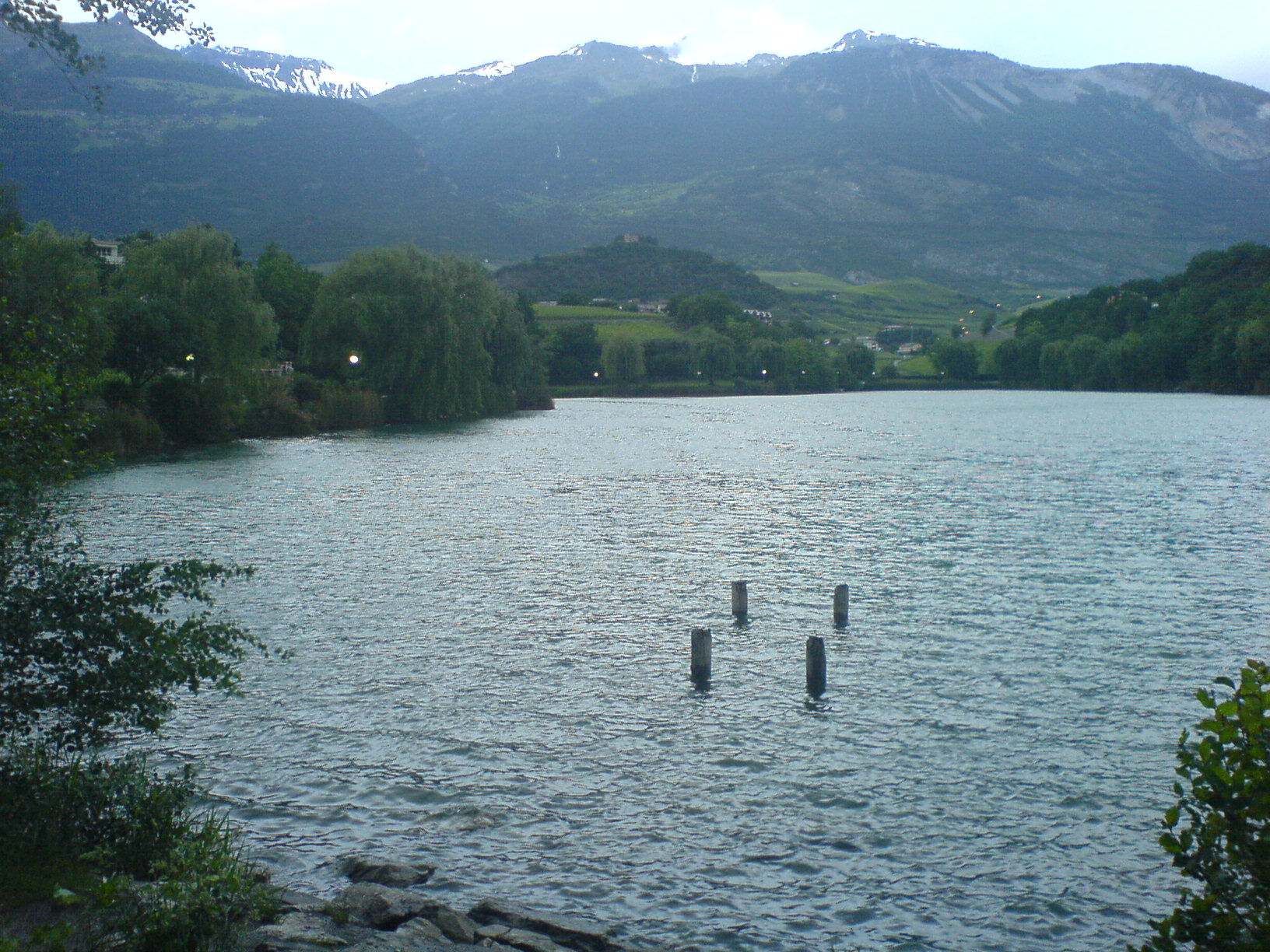

- Location within Canton of Valais Location within Switzerland Location within Alps
- Interactive map of Lac de Géronde
- Location: Sierre, Valais
- Coordinates: 46°17′21″N 7°32′35″E
- Basin countries: Switzerland
- Surface area: 5.5 ha (14 acres)
- Surface elevation: 523 m (1,716 ft)

Lac de Géronde (German: Gerundensee) is a lake at Sierre, Valais, Switzerland. At an elevation of 523 metres (1,716 ft), it has a surface area of 0.055 square kilometres.

A trail, made out of woodchips, leads around the lake. A public bathing beach, the „Bains de Géronde“, is located at the northwest border of the lake. Besides the main lake, there are two "petit lacs" (small lakes) close by.

From Sierre train station, the Lac de Géronde can be reached by foot in 10 minutes.

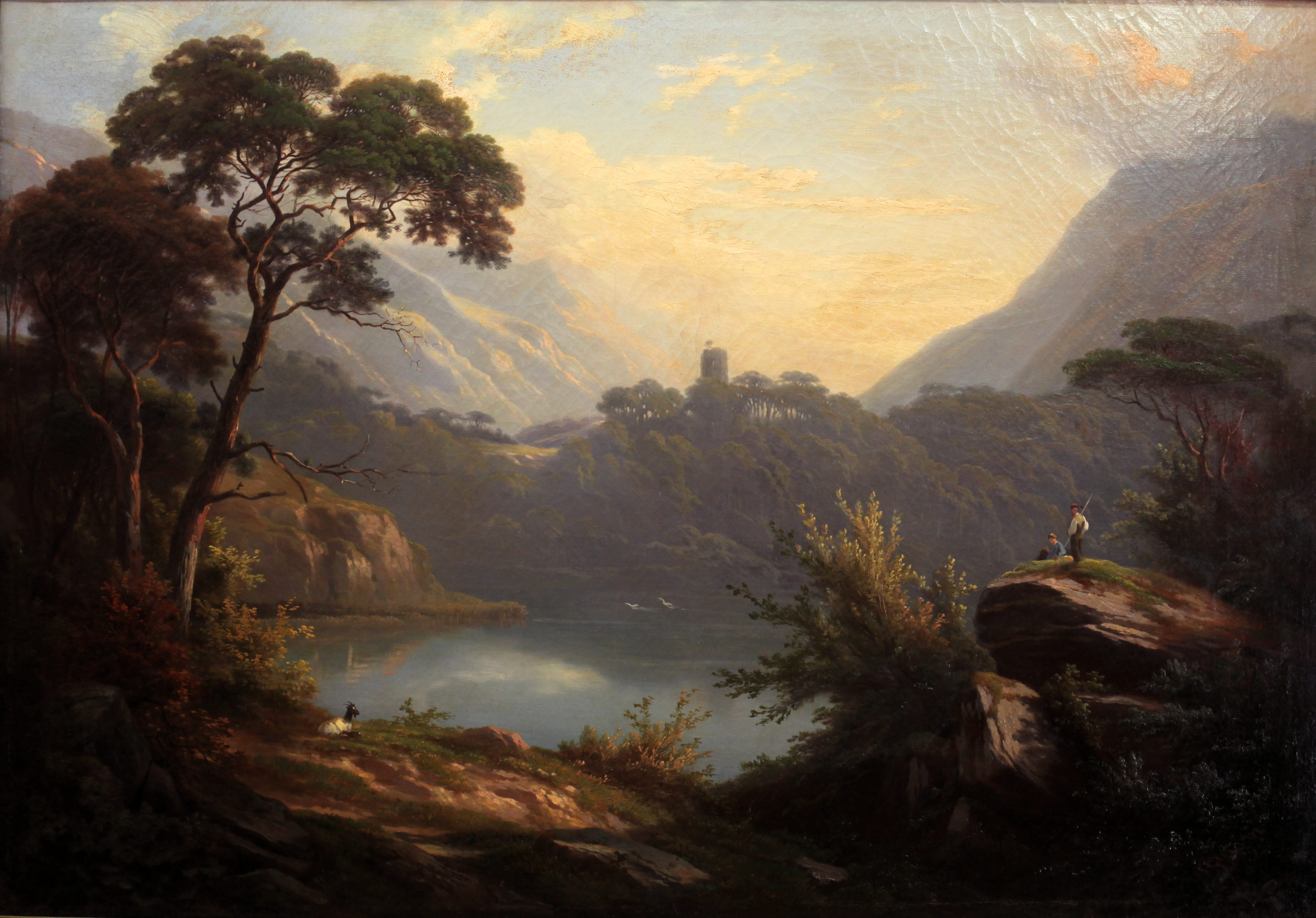
Painting by Charles-Louis Guigon, 1860
