= Nohao =

Coordinates: 11.2171°N 0.2634°W

- Interactive map of Nohao
- Country: Burkina Faso
- Region: Centre-Est Region
- Province: Boulgou Province
- Department: Bittou Department

Population (2019)
  - Total: 3,016

Nohao is a town in the Bittou Department of Boulgou Province in south-eastern Burkina Faso.

Population
Year	Pop.	±%
2006	2,176	—
2019	3,016	+38.6%
