= Bekoure =

Coordinates: 11.3233°N 0.3594°W

- Interactive map of Bekoure
- Country: Burkina Faso
- Region: Centre-Est Region
- Province: Boulgou Province
- Department: Bittou Department

Population (2019)
  - Total: 2,788

Bekoure is a town in the Bittou Department of Boulgou Province in south-eastern Burkina Faso.

Population
Year	Pop.	±%
1985	364	—
2006	3,270	+798.4%
2019	2,788	−14.7%
