= Fottigue =

Coordinates: 11°16′N 0°08′W

Fottigue Fodigue
- Interactive map of Fottigue
- Country: Burkina Faso
- Region: Centre-Est Region
- Province: Boulgou Province
- Department: Bittou Department

Population (2019)
  - Total: 1,003

Fottigue is a town in the Bittou Department of Boulgou Province in south-eastern Burkina Faso.

Population
Year	Pop.	±%
1985	2,239	—
2006	1,461	−34.7%
2019	1,003	−31.3%
