= Kankamogre-Peulh =

- Country: Burkina Faso
- Region: Centre-Est Region
- Province: Boulgou Province
- Department: Bittou Department

Population (2019)
  - Total: 1,093

Kankamogre-Peulh is a small town in the Bittou Department of Boulgou Province in south-eastern Burkina Faso.

It is located near Kankamogre, and the appended French ethnonym Peuhl (Fula or Fulani; Fula: Fulɓe) would indicate that its population was or is mainly Fula people.

Population
| Year | Pop. | ±% |
|---|---|---|
| 2006 | 1,517 | — |
| 2019 | 1,093 | −27.9% |
