= Loaba =

Coordinates: 11°14′N 0°26′W

- Interactive map of Loaba
- Country: Burkina Faso
- Region: Centre-Est Region
- Province: Boulgou Province
- Department: Bittou Department

Population (2019)
  - Total: 5,661

Loaba is a town in the Bittou Department of Boulgou Province in south-eastern Burkina Faso.

Population
Year	Pop.	±%
1985	4,105	—
2006	5,241	+27.7%
2019	5,661	+8.0%
