= Eliana Burki =

Swiss musician (1983–2023)

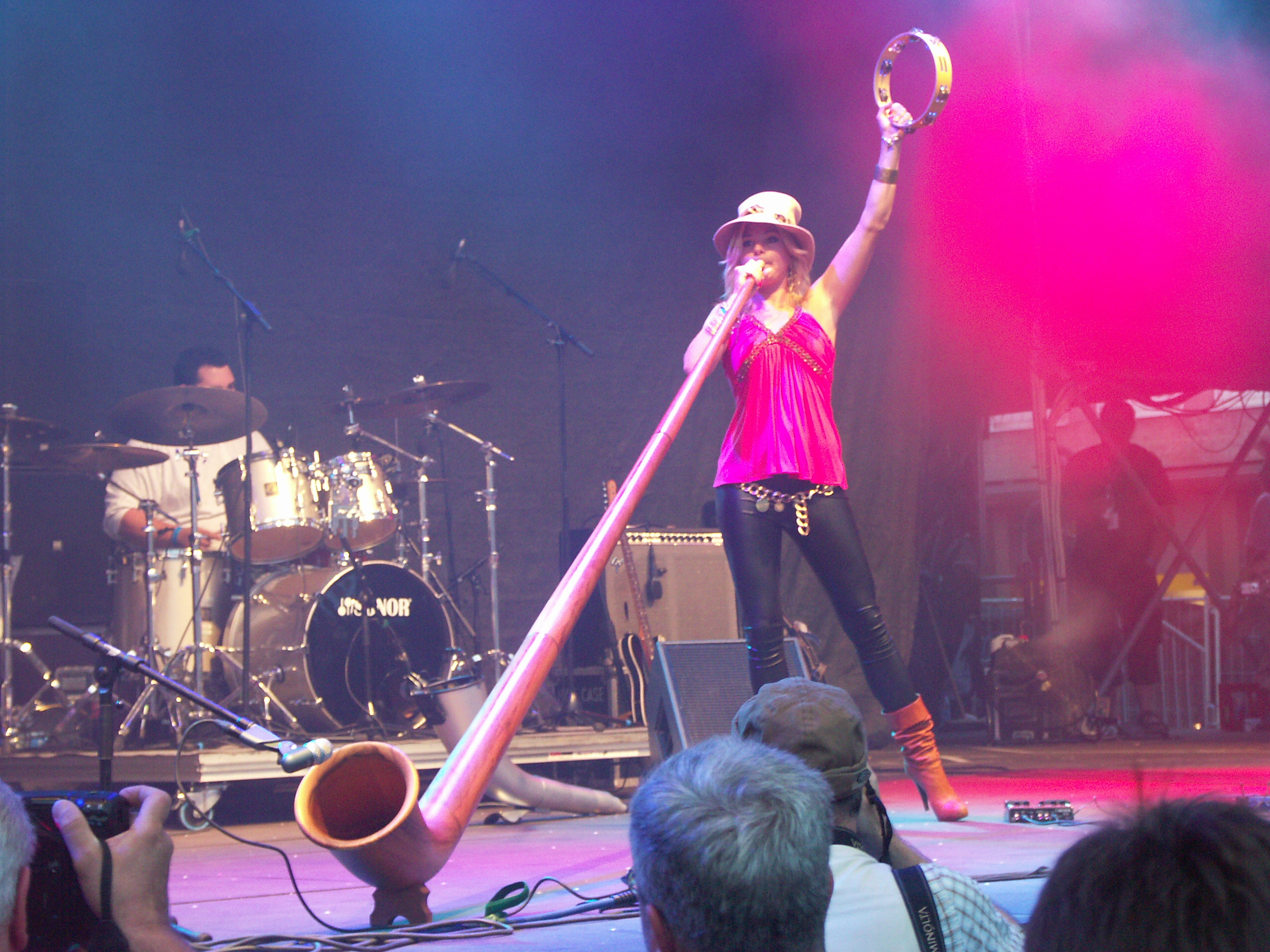
- Eliana Burki playing the Alphorn at the Nuremberg Bardentreffen festival in 2009
- Born: September 13, 1983; Feldbrunnen, Switzerland
- Died: April 24, 2023 (aged 39); Biel, Switzerland
- Occupation: Musician
- Children: 2

Eliana Burki (13 September 1983 in Feldbrunnen – 24 April 2023 in Switzerland) was a Swiss musician, best known for her unconventional playing of the alphorn. She composed and performed on the alphorn as a lead instrument in multiple genres, including pop, funk and world music. At the same time, she succeeded in creating her own musical niche, which brought her international attention, media coverage and bookings for concerts all over the world.

== Biography ==
Eliana Burki has been playing the alphorn since she was six years old. One of her first public appearances was at the Northwestern Switzerland Yodeling Festival in Schönenwerd, when she played among men at the age of nine. As she didn't like the traditional behaviour surrounding the alphorn, she did not play in a traditional costume, as is usually the case when playing the alphorn. As a teenager, she discovered her fondness for blues and jazz compositions.

Burki broke off her training as a veterinary assistant at the age of 16. She studied piano and singing at the Basel University of Music, as alphorn was not available as a subject. She repeatedly played classical alphorn concerts as a soloist with various orchestras. In addition to her work as a musician, she provided free music therapy at a children's clinic in Davos for children with cystic fibrosis.

Burki and her band (I Alpinisti) have performed worldwide. She made special appearances at the team draw for Euro 2008 and as an ambassador for Swiss music. The CD Heartbeat, which was produced with David Richards at Mountain Studios, was released in 2007. This was followed in 2011 by the album Travellin' Root, produced by John Boylan. On the album Alpine Horn Symphonic (2012), she performed as a soloist with the Munich Radio Orchestra led by Johannes Schlaefli, playing works by Daniel Schnyder, Jean Daetwyler and herself.

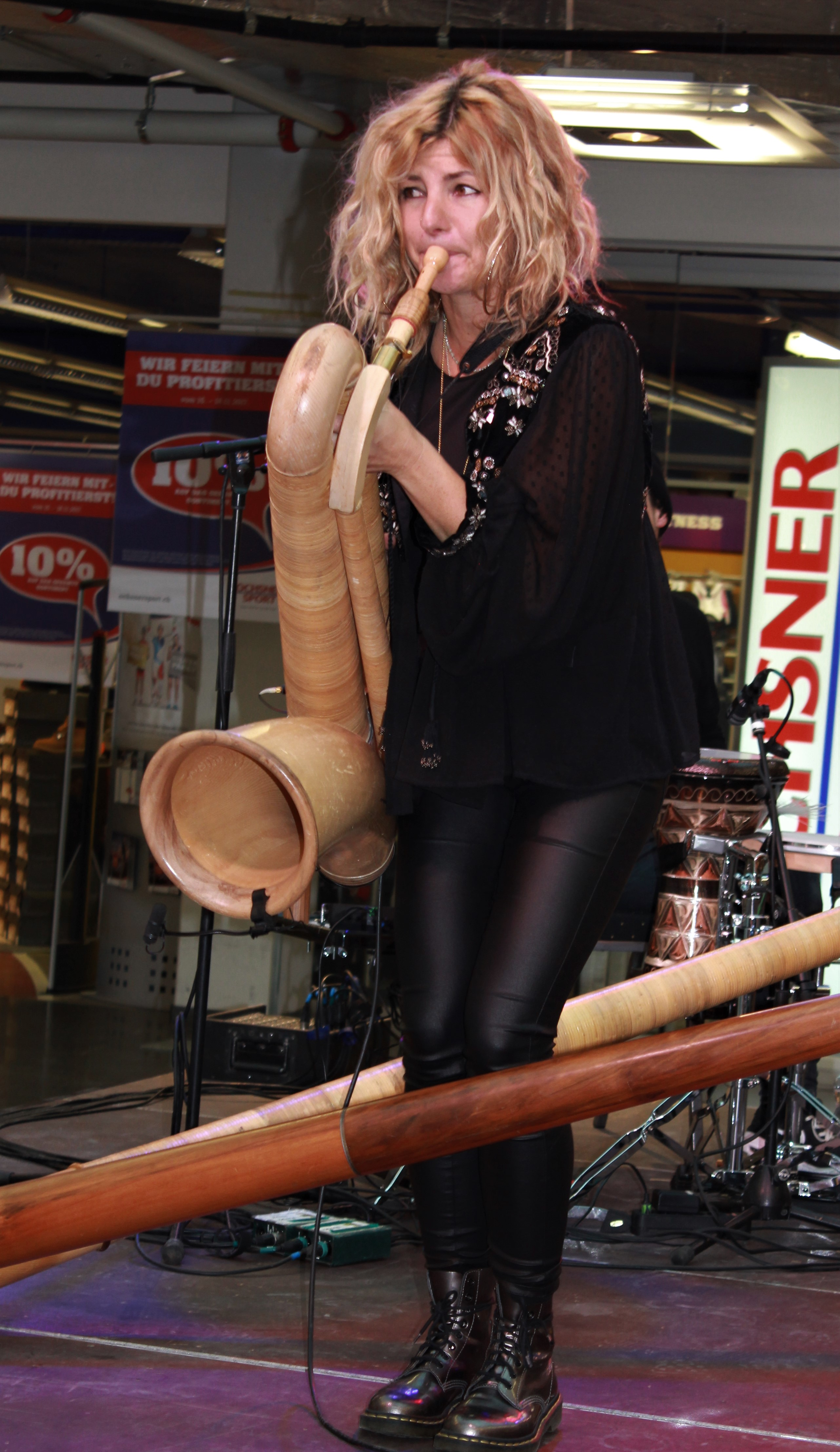
Eliana Burki playing jazz on a special built alphorn, in the style of a saxophone

Her album Arcardia (2016) was created in collaboration with producer Christian Lohr and the Solis String Quartet. Burki made her last concert appearance on 14 February 2023 as a soloist in Jean Daetwyler's Alphorn Concerto with the Braunschweig State Orchestra at the Scharoun Theatre in Wolfsburg. In addition to classic wooden alphorns, Burki also used lighter, extendable instruments made of carbon fibre. The "Burki horn", an alphorn she developed with a trumpet/whale horn valve (wind instrument) attachment, also allows the formation of chromatic tones, in contrast to the scale of the classical instrument, which is limited to the natural tone series.

Burki lived in Solothurn and Los Angeles, and the last two years before her death in Biel, Switzerland. She died on 24 April 2023 at the age of 39 as a result of a brain tumour. She is survived by her partner, the US writer Blas Ulibarri, and two children.

== Awards ==
- Small Prix Walo 2006.
- Prix Walo 2012 in the section Jazz/Blues/World Music.
