= Sawenga =

- Interactive map of Sawenga
- Coordinates: 11°20′22″N 0°03′24″W
- Country: Burkina Faso
- Region: Centre-Est Region
- Province: Boulgou Province
- Department: Bittou Department

Population (2019)
  - Total: 7,469

Sawenga is a town in the Bittou Department of Boulgou Province in south-eastern Burkina Faso.

Population
Year	Pop.	±%
2006	4,776	—
2019	7,469	+56.4%
