= Mogandé-Peulh =

Coordinates: 11.1921°N 0.1997°W

- Interactive map of Mogandé-Peulh
- Country: Burkina Faso
- Region: Centre-Est Region
- Province: Boulgou Province
- Department: Bittou Department

Population (2019)
  - Total: 758

Mogandé-Peulh is a village in the Bittou Department of Boulgou Province in south-eastern Burkina Faso.

Population
Year	Pop.	±%
1985	711	—
2006	474	−33.3%
2019	758	+59.9%
