= Bittou =

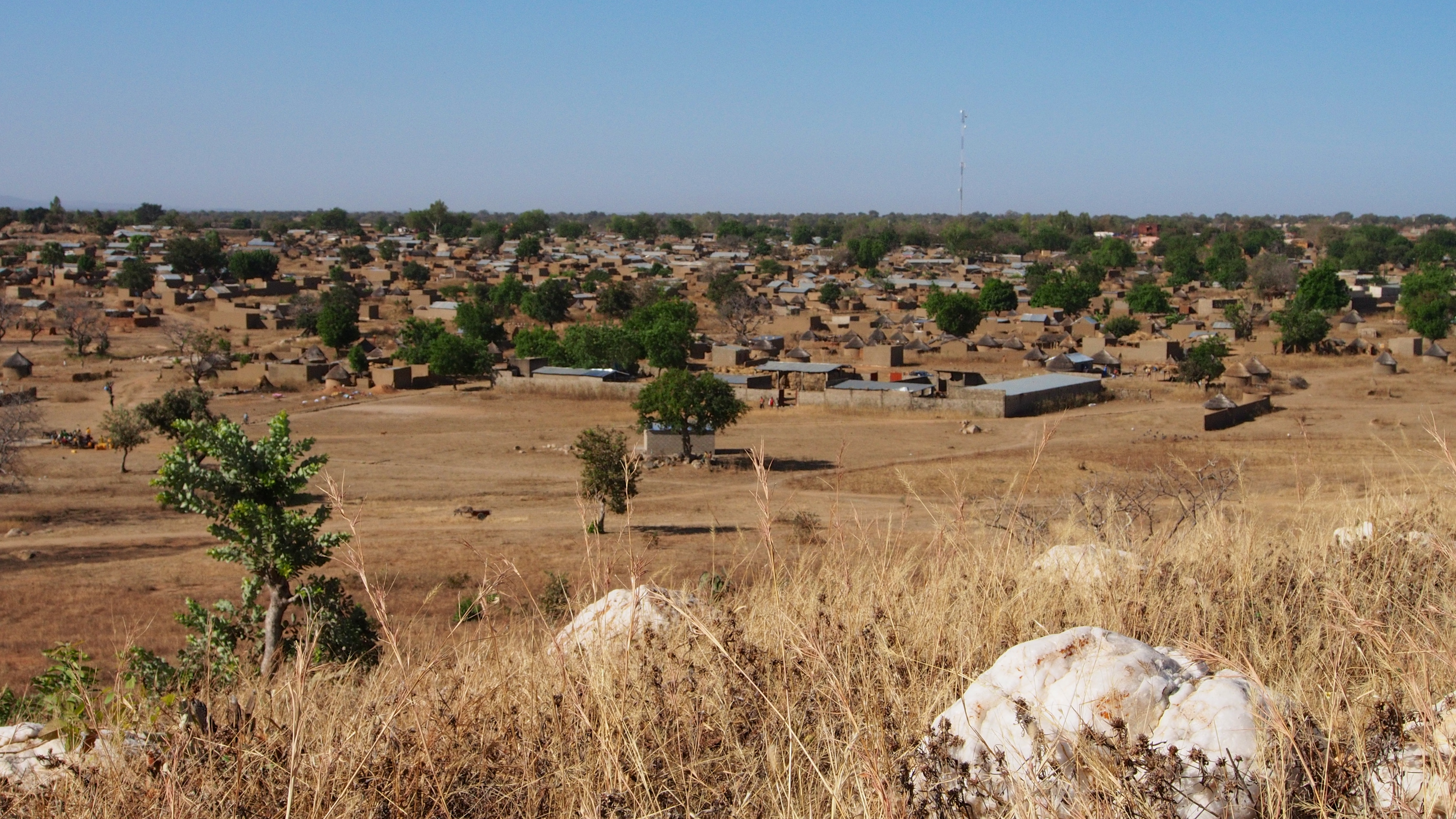

- Location in Burkina Faso
- Coordinates: 11°15′27″N 0°18′14″W
- Country: Burkina Faso
- Region: Centre-Est Region
- Province: Boulgou Province
- Department: Bittou Department

Population (2019)
  - Total: 31,210

Bittou is a town and seat of the Bittou Department of Boulgou Province in south-eastern Burkina Faso. The town is a stop on the caravan trading route. Today the town is located along the N16 Road which links Burkina Faso with Northern Togo and Ghana (via Togo). In 1898 the French Colonial Army built a fort here to keep the British Colonial Army from capturing the area.

== Climate ==
Köppen-Geiger climate classification system classifies its climate as tropical wet and dry (Aw) that closely borders with hot semi-arid (BSh).

Climate data for Bittou
Month	Jan	Feb	Mar	Apr	May	Jun	Jul	Aug	Sep	Oct	Nov	Dec	Year
Mean daily maximum °C (°F)	35.1 (95.2)	36.6 (97.9)	38.4 (101.1)	37.9 (100.2)	35.6 (96.1)	32.9 (91.2)	30.8 (87.4)	30 (86)	30.9 (87.6)	34 (93)	36.1 (97.0)	34.7 (94.5)	34.4 (93.9)
Daily mean °C (°F)	27.1 (80.8)	29 (84)	31.2 (88.2)	31.4 (88.5)	29.9 (85.8)	27.8 (82.0)	26.2 (79.2)	25.8 (78.4)	26.1 (79.0)	27.8 (82.0)	28.1 (82.6)	26.7 (80.1)	28.1 (82.6)
Mean daily minimum °C (°F)	19.1 (66.4)	21.4 (70.5)	24.1 (75.4)	25 (77)	24.3 (75.7)	22.7 (72.9)	21.7 (71.1)	21.6 (70.9)	21.4 (70.5)	21.7 (71.1)	20.2 (68.4)	18.8 (65.8)	21.8 (71.3)
Average precipitation mm (inches)	0 (0)	1 (0.0)	11 (0.4)	36 (1.4)	87 (3.4)	116 (4.6)	180 (7.1)	239 (9.4)	155 (6.1)	47 (1.9)	4 (0.2)	3 (0.1)	879 (34.6)
Source: Climate-Data.org, altitude: 247m

== See also ==
- List of cities in Burkina Faso

Population
Year	Pop.	±%
1985	5,188	—
2006	20,118	+287.8%
2019	31,210	+55.1%
