= Gnangdin =

Coordinates: 11.3927°N 0.3534°W

- Interactive map of Gnangdin
- Country: Burkina Faso
- Region: Centre-Est Region
- Province: Boulgou Province
- Department: Bittou Department

Population (2019)
  - Total: 7,337

Gnangdin is a town in the Bittou Department of Boulgou Province in south-eastern Burkina Faso.

Population
Year	Pop.	±%
1985	4,804	—
2006	5,087	+5.9%
2019	7,337	+44.2%
