= Jean Daetwyler =

Swiss composer and musician

Jean Daetwyler (24 January 1907 in Basel – 4 June 1994 in Sierre) was a Swiss composer and musician. He is barely remembered, mostly for his largely forgotten works for alphorn inspired by Jozsef Molnar beginning in 1970. Also inspired by trombonist Branimir Slokar and other aspects of Swiss culture.

Daetwyler was a pupil of Vincent d'Indy at the Paris Conservatoire. He returned to Switzerland in 1933 to teach for over four decades. His work was also part of the music event in the art competition at the 1948 Summer Olympics.
