= Zampa, Burkina Faso =

Zampa
- Country: Burkina Faso
- Region: Centre-Est Region
- Province: Boulgou Province
- Department: Bittou Department

Population (2019)
  - Total: 2,569

Zampa is a town in the Bittou Department of Boulgou Province in south-eastern Burkina Faso.

Population
Year	Pop.	±%
1985	433	—
2006	1,855	+328.4%
2019	2,569	+38.5%
