= Nianle =

- Country: Burkina Faso
- Region: Centre-Est Region
- Province: Boulgou Province
- Department: Bittou Department

Population (2019)
  - Total: 2,175

Nianle is a town in the Bittou Department of Boulgou Province in south-eastern Burkina Faso.

Population
| Year | Pop. | ±% |
|---|---|---|
| 1985 | 1,709 | — |
| 2006 | 1,090 | −36.2% |
| 2019 | 2,175 | +99.5% |
