= Bittou Department =

Coordinates: 11°16′N 0°18′W

Bittou Bitou
- Department
- Bittou
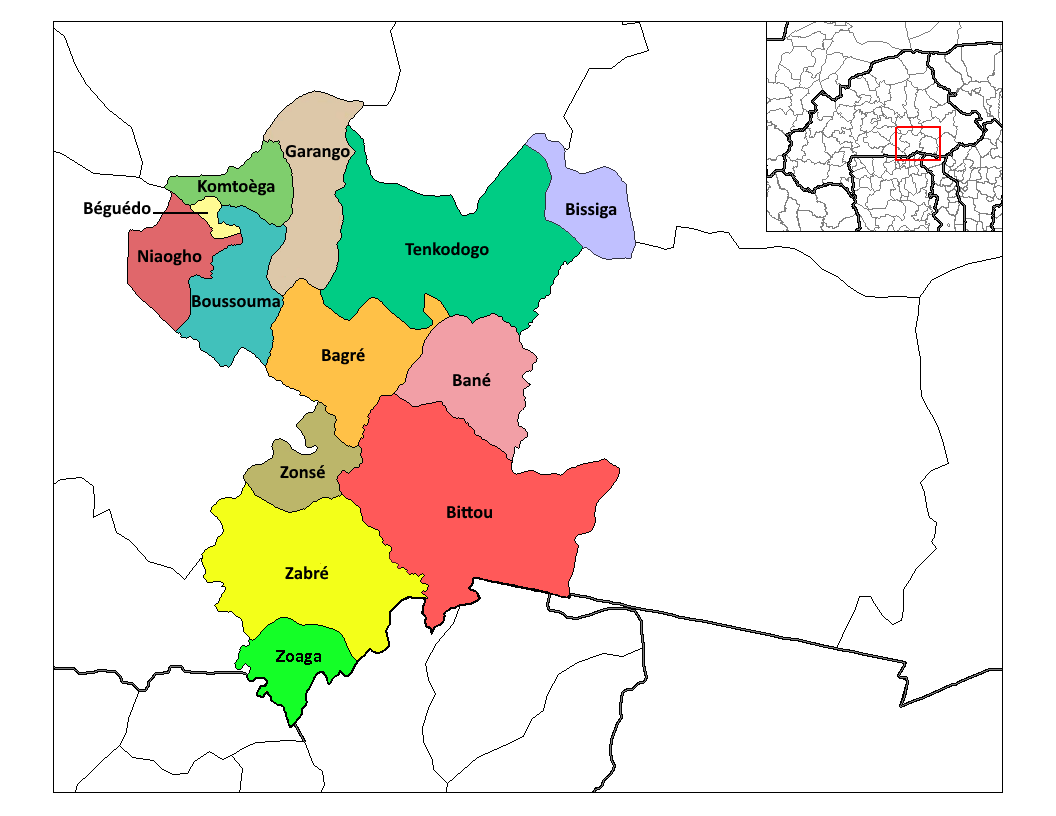
- Bittou Department location in the province
- Country: Burkina Faso
- Province: Boulgou Province

Area
  - Department: 519 sq mi (1,345 km^{2})

Population (2019 census)
  - Department: 102,400
  - Density: 197.2/sq mi (76.13/km^{2})
  - Urban: 31,210
- Time zone: UTC+0 (GMT 0)

Bittou or Bitou is a department or commune of Boulgou Province in eastern Burkina Faso. Its capital is the town of Bittou. According to the 2019 census the department has a total population of 102,400.

== Towns and villages ==
- Bittou (or Bitou) (31 210 inhabitants) (capital)
- Bekoure (2 676 inhabitants)
- Belayerla (1 230 inhabitants)
- Bourzoaga (17 inhabitants)
- Dema (1 535 inhabitants)
- Fottigue (2 698 inhabitants)
- Garanga (1 561 inhabitants)
- Gnangdin (4 495 inhabitants)
- Kankamogre (3 028 inhabitants)
- Kankamogre-Peulh (960 inhabitants)
- Kanyire (1 940 inhabitants)
- Kodemzoaga (594 inhabitants)
- Komtenga (157 inhabitants)
- Largue (621 inhabitants)
- Loaba (3 518 inhabitants)
- Loaba-Peulh (1 768 inhabitants)
- Mogandé (350 inhabitants)
- Mogandé-Peulh (350 inhabitants)
- Mogomnore (2 422 inhabitants)
- Nianle (1 574 inhabitants)
- Nohao (1 555 inhabitants)
- Sangabouli (1 164 inhabitants)
- Sawenga (5 039 inhabitants)
- Tiba (1 692 inhabitants)
- Zambanega (1 046 inhabitants)
- Zampa (1 974 inhabitants)
- Zekeze (2 571 inhabitants)
