= Mogomnore =

Coordinates: 11°07′N 0°17′W

- Interactive map of Mogomnore
- Country: Burkina Faso
- Region: Centre-Est Region
- Province: Boulgou Province
- Department: Bittou Department

Population (2019)
  - Total: 4,253

Mogomnore is a town in the Bittou Department of Boulgou Province in south-eastern Burkina Faso.

Population
Year	Pop.	±%
1985	936	—
2006	2,777	+196.7%
2019	4,253	+53.2%
