= Zekeze =

- Country: Burkina Faso
- Region: Centre-Est Region
- Province: Boulgou Province
- Department: Bittou Department

Population (2019)
  - Total: 3,156

Zekeze is a town in the Bittou Department of Boulgou Province in southeastern Burkina Faso.

Population
Year	Pop.	±%
2006	2,914	—
2019	3,156	+8.3%
