= Kodemzoaga =

- Country: Burkina Faso
- Region: Centre-Est Region
- Province: Boulgou Province
- Department: Bittou Department

Population (2019)
  - Total: 1,620

Kodemzoaga is a village in the Bittou Department of Boulgou Province in south-eastern Burkina Faso.

Population
Year	Pop.	±%
2006	473	—
2019	1,620	+242.5%
