= Switzerland men's national ball hockey team =

Switzerland
- Nickname: Switzerland
- Association: Swiss Street Hockey Association (SSHA)
- Head coach: Tibor Kapánek
- Captain: Raphael Melliger

Biggest win
- Switzerland 22 - 0 Latvia (Sierre, Switzerland, 2003)

Biggest defeat
- Czech Republic 19 - 0 Switzerland (Bratislava, Slovakia, 1996)

Ball Hockey World Championship
- Appearances: 14 (first in 1996)
- Best result: 4th (1999, 2001)

The Switzerland men's national ball hockey team is the men's national ball hockey team of Switzerland, and a member of the International Street and Ball Hockey Federation (ISBHF).

== World Championships ==
Year	Location	Result
1996	Bratislava, Slovakia	7th place
1998	Litoměřice, Czech Republic	7th place
1999	Zvolen, Slovakia	4th place
2001	Toronto, Canada	4th place
2003	Sierra, Switzerland	5th place
2005	Pittsburgh, USA	8th place
2007	Ratingen, Slovakia	6th place
2009	Plzeň, Czech Republic	11th place
2011	Bratislava, Slovakia	10th place
2013	St.John's, Canada	7th place
2015	Zug, Switzerland	6th place
2017	Pardubice, Czech Republic	7th place
2019	Košice, Slovakia	6th place
2024	Visp, Switzerland	4th place
