= Komtenga =

- Location in Burkina Faso
- Coordinates: 12.128228°N 1.546091°W
- Country: Burkina Faso
- Region: Centre-Est Region
- Province: Boulgou Province
- Department: Bittou Department

Population (2019)
  - Total: 137

Komtenga is a village in the Bittou Department of Boulgou Province in south-eastern Burkina Faso.

Population
Year	Pop.	±%
1985	437	—
2006	138	−68.4%
2019	137	−0.7%
