= Kankamogre =

- Country: Burkina Faso
- Region: Centre-Est Region
- Province: Boulgou Province
- Department: Bittou Department

Population (2019)
  - Total: 1,966

Kankamogre is a town in the Bittou Department of Boulgou Province in south-eastern Burkina Faso.

== See also ==
- Kankamogre-Peulh

Population
Year	Pop.	±%
2006	2,105	—
2019	1,966	−6.6%
