= Dema, Burkina Faso =

Dema
- Country: Burkina Faso
- Region: Centre-Est Region
- Province: Boulgou Province
- Department: Bittou Department
- Elevation: 369 m (1,211 ft)

Population (2019)
  - Total: 2,384

Dema is a town in the Bittou Department of Boulgou Province in south-eastern Burkina Faso.

Population
Year	Pop.	±%
2006	1,351	—
2019	2,384	+76.5%
