= Finland men's national ball hockey team =

Finland
- Nickname: Finland
- Association: Suomen Ballhockeyliitto ry. (SBHL) / eng. Finnish Ball Hockey Federation
- Captain: Ville Väänänen

Biggest win
- (United Kingdom) Great Britain 0 - 13 Finland (Košice, Slovakia June, 2019)

Biggest defeat
- Czech Republic 9 - 0 Finland (Zug, Switzerland June, 2015)

Ball Hockey World Championship
- Appearances: 8 (first in 2009)
- Best result: Silver: (2019)

Finland men's national ball hockey team
Medal record

World Championships
Silver medal – second place	2019 Slovakia	Team
Bronze medal – third place	2026 Czech Republic	Team

The Finland men's national ball hockey team is the men's national ball hockey team of Finland, and a member of the International Street and Ball Hockey Federation (ISBHF).

== World Championships ==
Year	Location	Result
2009	Plzeň, Czech Republic	13th place
2011	Bratislava, Slovakia	7th place
2015	Zug, Switzerland	8th place
2017	Pardubice, Czech Republic	9th place
2019	Košice, Slovakia	Silver
2022	Laval, Canada	7th place
2024	Visp / Raron, Switzerland	7th place
2026	Ostrava, Czech Republic	Bronze
