= Vincent Gessler =

Swiss writer (born 1976)

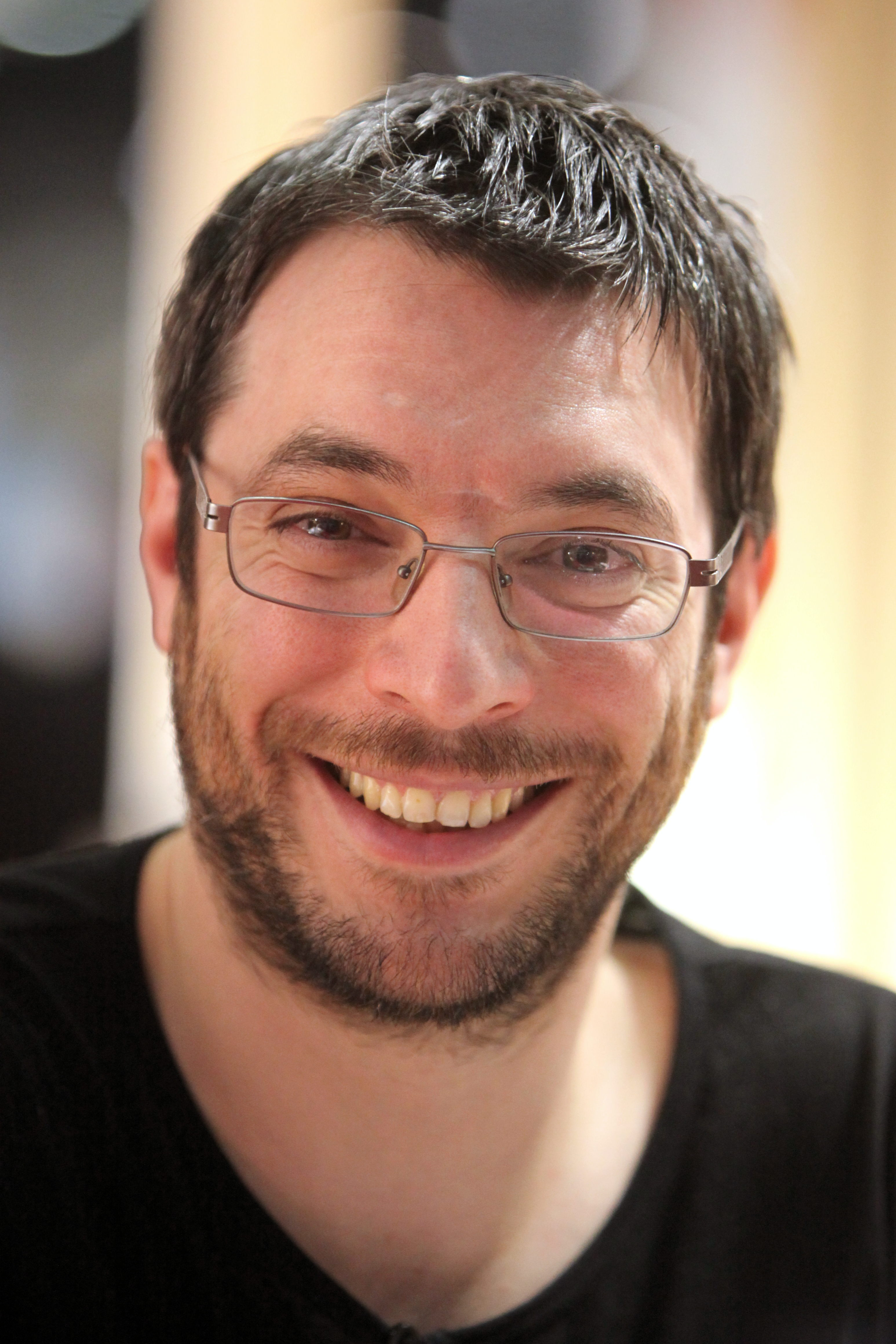
- Born: 26 November 1976 (age 49); Sierre, Switzerland
- Occupations: Writer, former Teacher
- Writing career
- Period: 2003–present
- Genres: Science fiction, horror

Vincent Gessler (born November 26, 1976) in Sierre) is a Swiss science fiction author based in Geneva, Switzerland.

== Biography ==
Vincent Gessler divides his time among writing, comics, online games, sciences, history and story telling. He caught the science fiction virus very early and became passionately interested in comics. He studied Egyptology and medieval history, before teaching French, history and computer programming. Now he devotes his time to writing.

== Bibliography ==
Novel

- Cygnis, L'Atalante, La Dentelle du cygne, 2010.
- Mimosa, L'Atalante, La Dentelle du cygne, 2012.

Anthology

Dimension Suisse : anthologie de science-fiction et de fantastique romande, in collaboration with Anthony Vallat, Rivière Blanche, n° Fusée 11, 28 August.

Short stories

- 2003 : La déesse blanche, published in Iles sur le toit du monde : une anthologie romande de science-fiction, Archipel n° 24.
- 2004 : La tête dans le sable published in Horrifique, (St-Jean, Quebec) n° 41.
- 2006 : Fractal published in Utopiae 2006, L'Atalante.
- 2006 : Au bord de l'Abyme, published in Lunatique n° 73, Eons.
- 2007 : Les risques du métier published in Lunatique n° 77, Eons.
- 2008 : Retour aux sources published in Les tribulations d'un voyageur helvétique, Éditions Zoé.
- 2010 : Miroirs du Ciel published in Utopiales 2010, ActuSF.
- 2012 : Où vont les reines, published in Reines & Dragons, Mnemos, 2012.
- 2012 : Les Derniers Matins du monde, published in Le Courrier, 22.12.2012, Genève.
- 2013 : Voyager I, published in La Tribune de Genève, 5.10.2013, Genève.
- 2015 : Le Journal d'Emma, six short stories published in Le Temps, from 23.11.2015 to 28.11.2015, Genève.
- 2016 : Adar - Retour à Yirminadingrad, éditions Dystopia, October 2016.

== Awards ==
- Julia Verlanger Award in 2010 for Cygnis.
- Utopiales European Prize in 2010 for Cygnis.
