= Loaba-Peulh =

- Country: Burkina Faso
- Region: Centre-Est Region
- Province: Boulgou Province
- Department: Bittou Department

Population (2019)
  - Total: 2,237

Loaba-Peulh is a town in the Bittou Department of Boulgou Province in south-eastern Burkina Faso.

Population
Year	Pop.	±%
1985	594	—
2006	40	−93.3%
2019	2,237	+5492.5%
