= Mogandé =

Coordinates: 11.1844°N 0.1988°W

- Interactive map of Mogandé
- Country: Burkina Faso
- Region: Centre-Est Region
- Province: Boulgou Province
- Department: Bittou Department

Population (2019)
  - Total: 7,812

Mogandé is a village in the Bittou Department of Boulgou Province in south-eastern Burkina Faso.

Population
Year	Pop.	±%
1985	1,065	—
2006	4,325	+306.1%
2019	7,812	+80.6%
