= Alphorn =

Long wooden musical horn

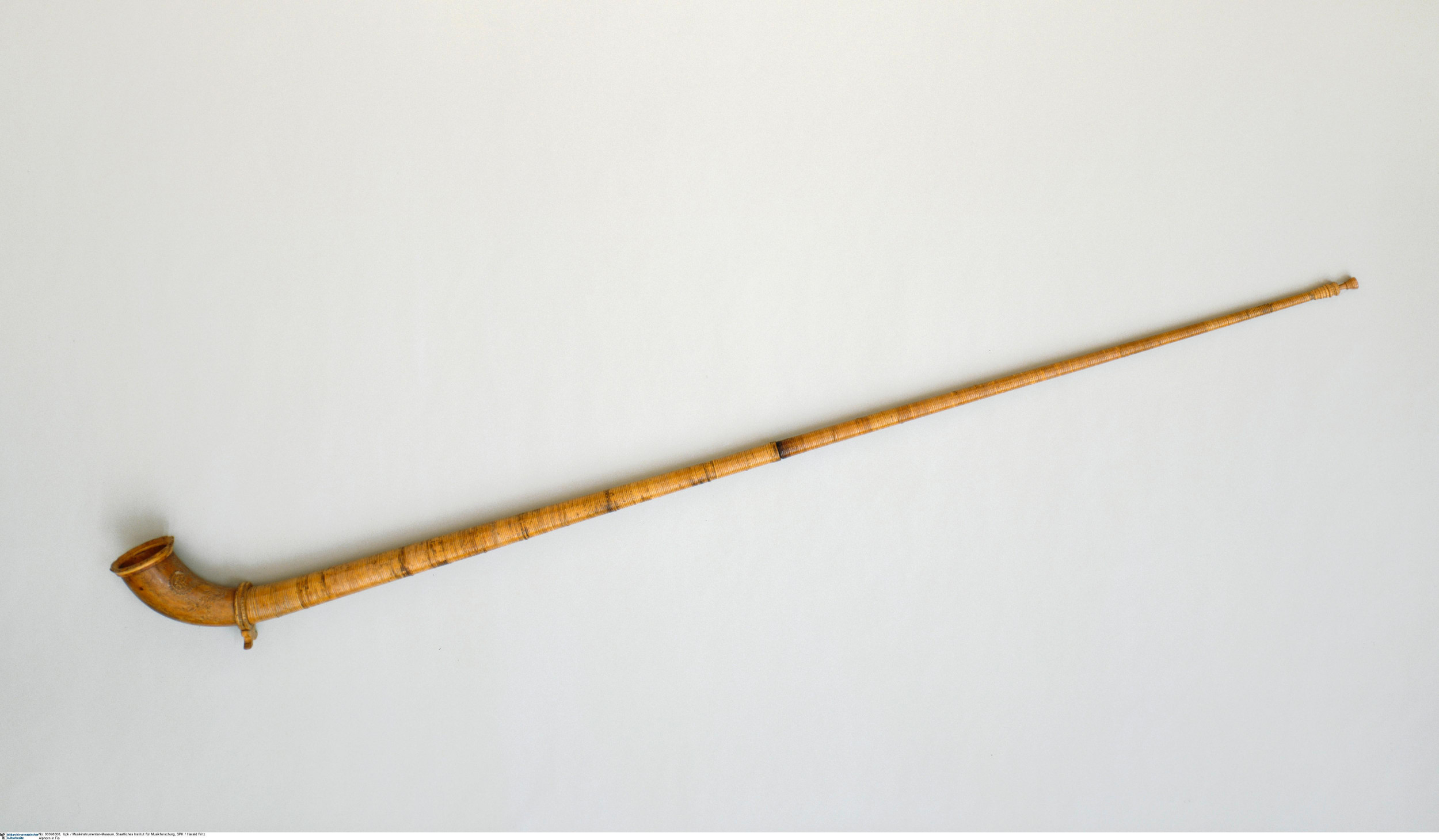
- Alphorn, Staatliches Institut für Musikforschung, Berlin

Brass instrument
- Classification: Aerophone; Wind instrument; Labrosone
- Hornbostel–Sachs classification: 423.121.12 (End-blown straight labrosones with mouthpiece)

Related instruments
- Bucium, trembita

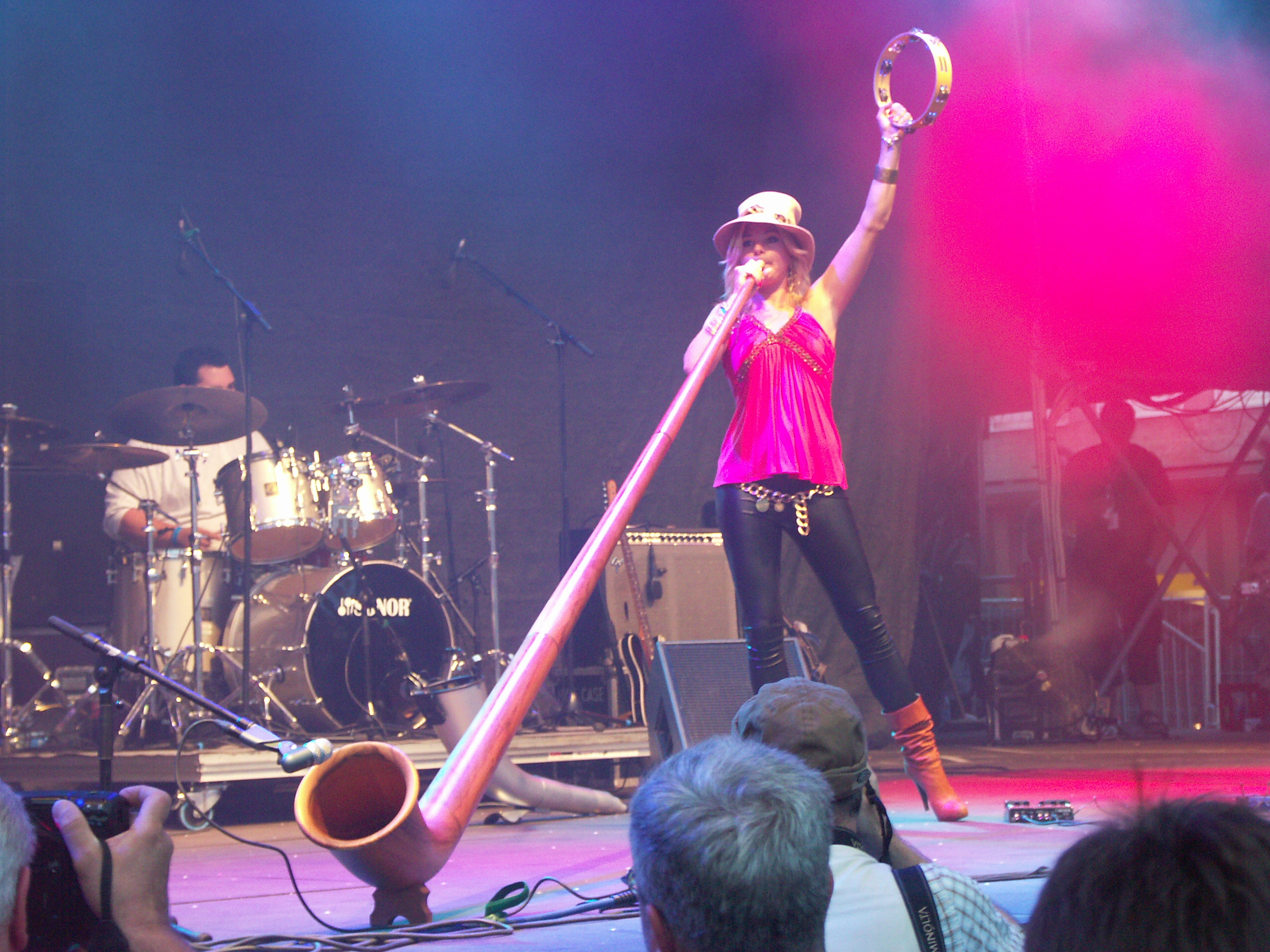
Eliana Burki playing the alphorn at the Bardentreffen festival in Nuremberg 2009

The alphorn (German: Alphorn, Alpenhorn; French: cor des Alpes; Italian: corno alpino) is a traditional lip-reed wind instrument. It consists of a long straight wooden natural horn, with a length of 3 to 4 metres (9.8 to 13 feet), a conical bore and a wooden cup-shaped mouthpiece. The alphorn was traditionally made in one piece from the trunk of a pine. Modern alphorns are usually made in three detachable sections for easier transport and handling, carved from blocks of spruce. The alphorn is used by rural communities in the Alps. Similar wooden horns were used for communication in most mountainous regions of Europe, from the Alps to the Carpathians.

== History ==
The alphorn may have developed from instruments like the lituus, a similarly shaped Etruscan instrument of classical antiquity, although there is little documented evidence of a continuous connection between them. A 2nd century Roman mosaic, found in Boscéaz, depicts a shepherd using a similar straight horn. The use of long signal horns in mountainous areas throughout Europe and Asia may indicate a long history of cultural cross-influences regarding their construction and usage.

The first documented use of the German word Alphorn is in a payment recorded in the 1527 accounts ledger of Saint Urban's Abbey in Pfaffnau. Swiss naturalist Conrad Gessner used the words lituum alpinum for the first known detailed description of the alphorn, in his De raris et admirandis herbis (1555); in his time, the word lituus was used for several other wind instruments, like the horn, crumhorn, or cornett. In the early 17th century, music scholar Michael Praetorius in his treatise Syntagma Musicum (1614–1620) depicts an alphorn-like instrument he called a Hölzern Trummet ("wooden trumpet"), noting they are used by shepherds.

From the 17th to 19th century, alphorns were used in rural areas of the Alps, for signalling between high pastures across the valleys and to communities on the valley floor. The alphorn sounds can carry for several kilometres, and were even used to collect together dispersed herds. Although use by herdsmen had waned by the early 19th century, a revival of interest in the musical qualities of the instrument followed by the end of the century, and the alphorn became important in tourism, and inspired Romantic composers such as Beethoven and Gustav Mahler to add alphorn, or traditional alphorn melodies, to their pieces.

== Construction and qualities ==
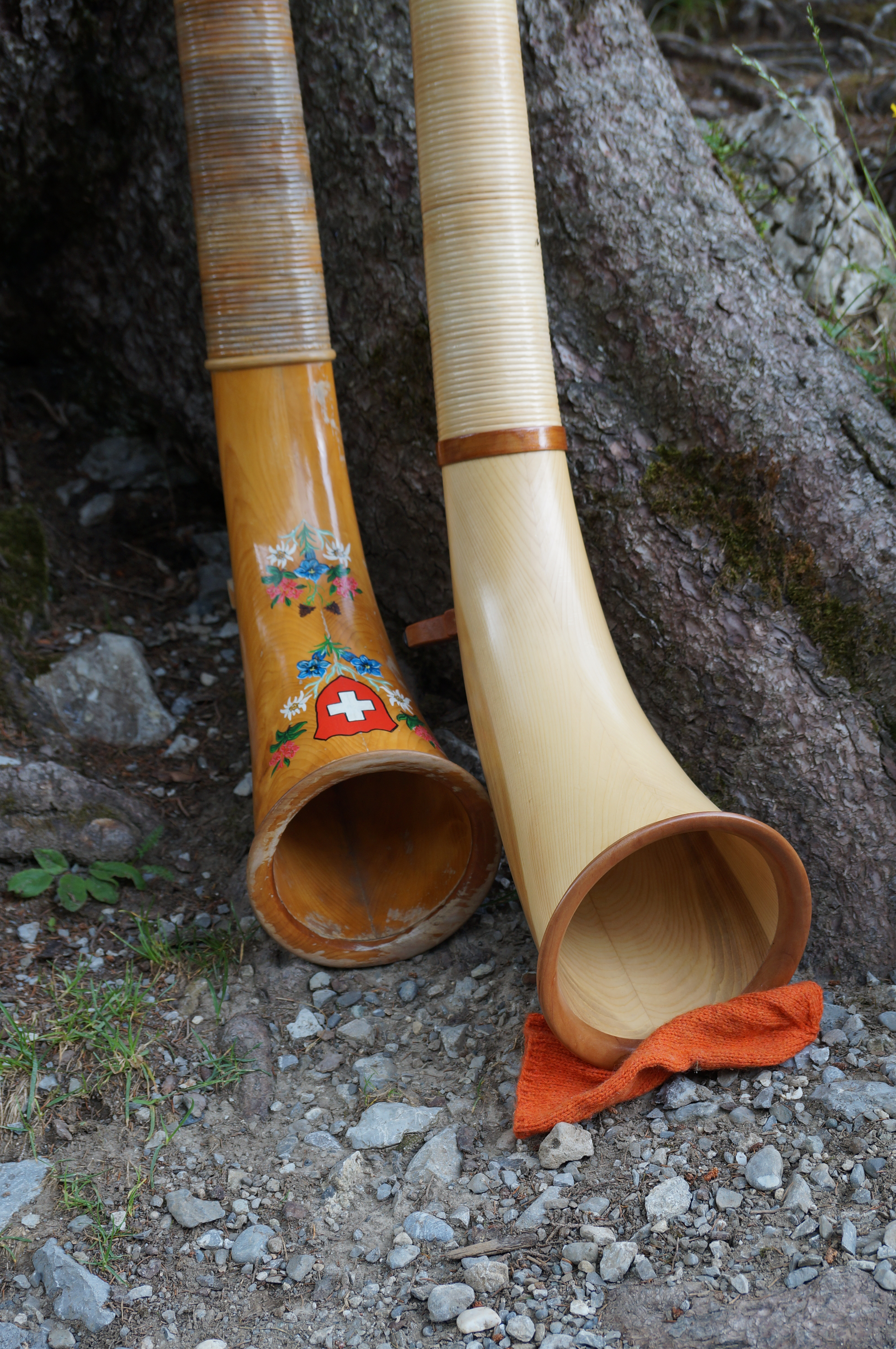
Alphorn bell detail

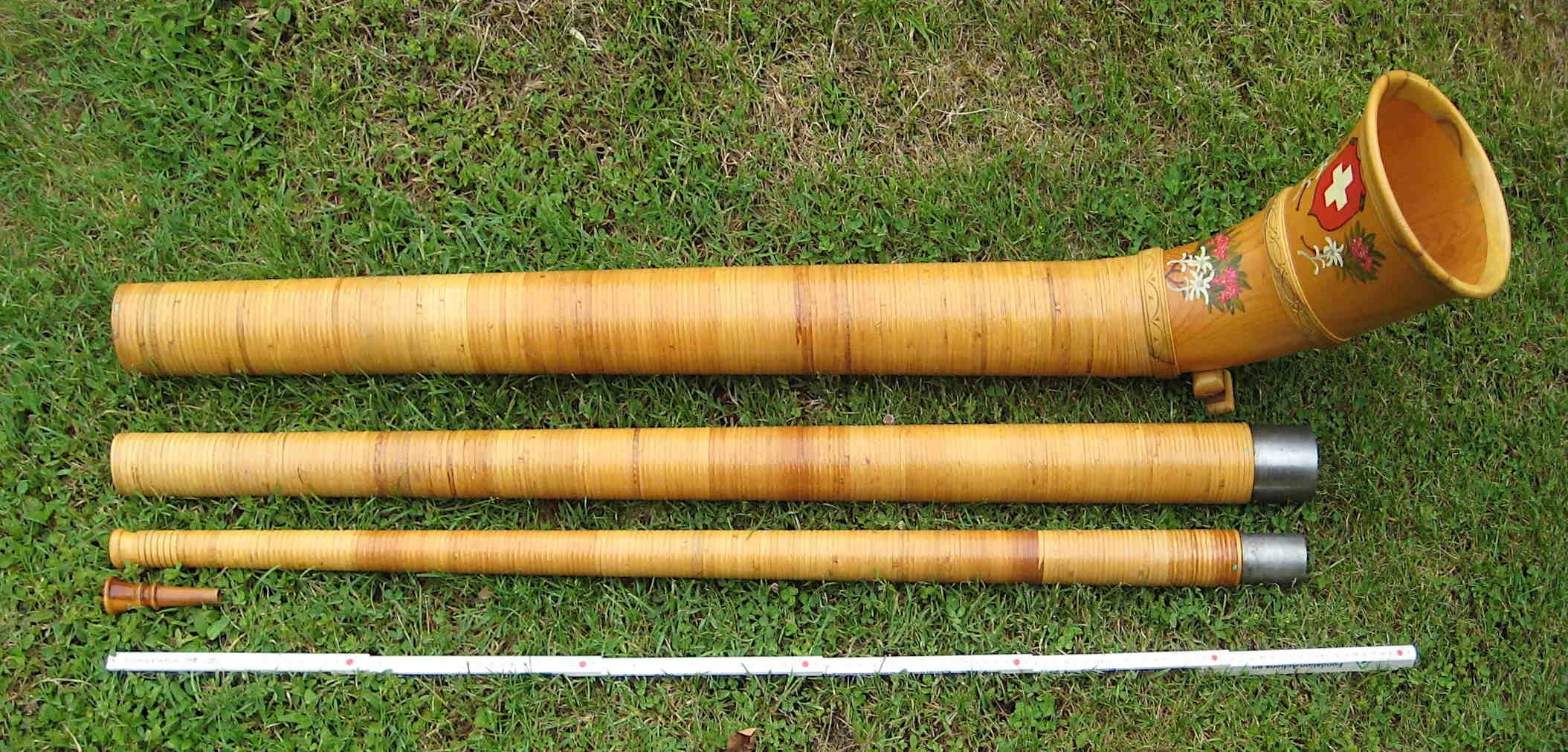
Alphorn (F#) in 3 parts + mouthpiece, about 1.2 m.

The alphorn is carved from solid softwood, usually pine or spruce. Traditionally, the alphorn maker would find a tree growing on a slope and bent at the base providing the curved shape for the bell. The long trunk would be cut in half longways, the bore hollowed out, then glued and bound back together with outer layers of stripped bark. Modern instruments are made in several sections for more convenient handling and transport, each turned and bored from solid blocks of spruce. An integrated cup-shaped mouthpiece was traditionally carved into the narrow end, while modern instruments have a separate removable mouthpiece carved from hard wood.

An alphorn in C measures 8 feet (2.4 m) in length and has a straight tube ending in a curved bell. An alphorn in F measures 12 feet (3.7 m) in length and typically weighs 3 to 4 kg. When playing, most of the weight is borne by a small stand under the bell.

The alphorn is a simple tube with no lateral openings or means of adjusting the pitch, so only the notes of the natural harmonic series are available. As with other natural labrosones, some of the notes do not correspond to the Western equal tempered chromatic scale, particularly the 7th and 11th partials, but also the 13th and 14th ones, which are however seldom used, as these and higher notes are difficult to play.

Two alphorns being performed in Switzerland

Accomplished alphornists can command a range of nearly four octaves, consisting of the 1st through the 16th partials. The 1st, the fundamental so-called pedal tone for example C2, is rarely played.

Notes for the alphorn are usually written in C for simplicity, even though most alphorns have a fundamental tone of F#1 in Switzerland and F1 in Germany, that is 6, respectively 7, halftones below C2. This way the same notes can be used for all alphorns.

The well-known "Ranz des Vaches" (score) is a traditional Swiss melody often heard on the alphorn. It was traditionally used for calling cows from the pastures at milking time. Rossini introduced the "Ranz des Vaches" into his masterpiece William Tell, along with many other melodies scattered throughout the opera in vocal and instrumental parts that are well-suited to the alphorn. Brahms wrote to Clara Schumann that the inspiration for the dramatic entry of the horn in the introduction to the last movement of his First Symphony was an alphorn melody he heard while vacationing in the Rigi area of Switzerland. For Clara's birthday in 1868 Brahms sent her a greeting that was to be sung with the melody.

== Repertoire ==
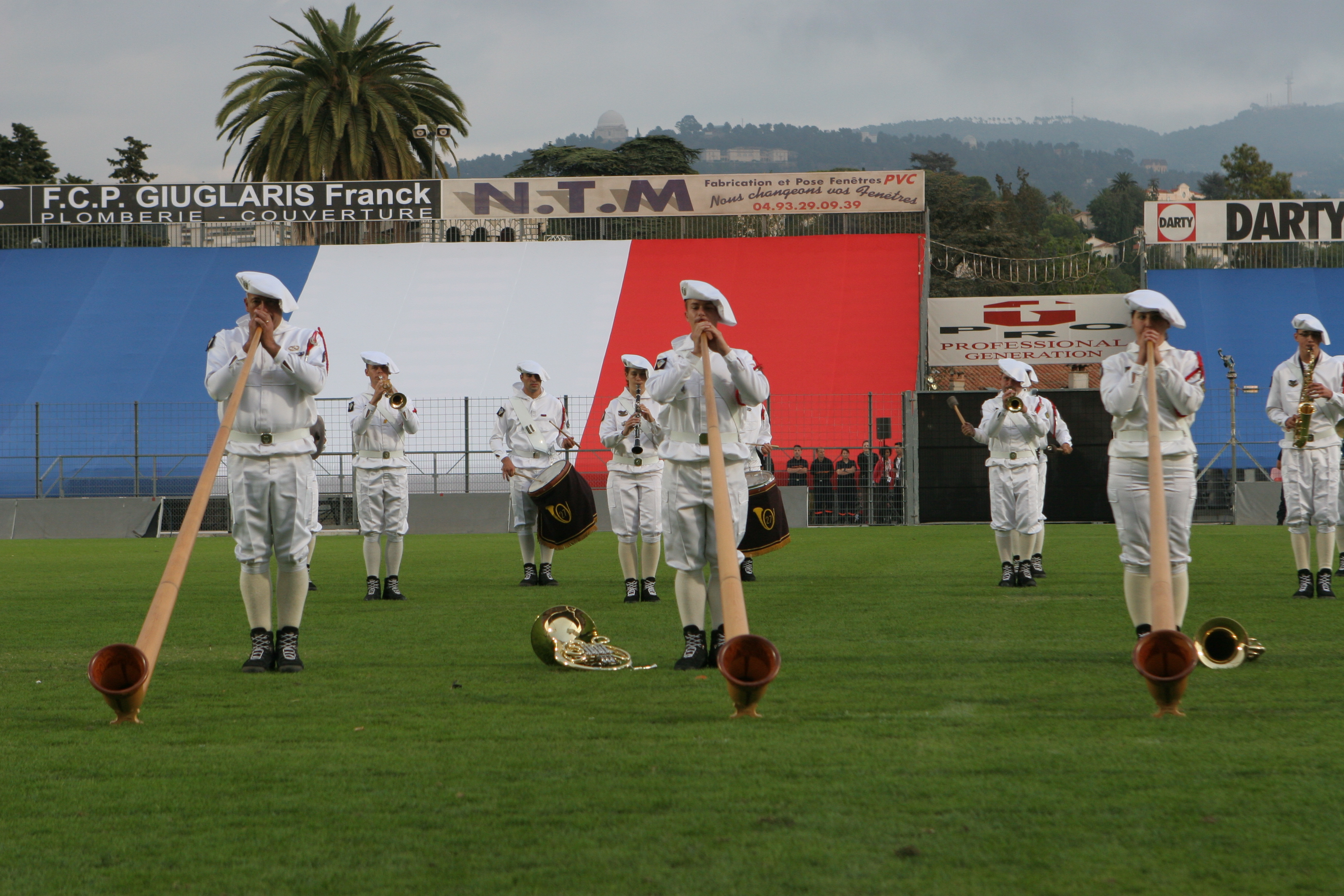
The military band of the French Chasseurs Alpins uses alphorns

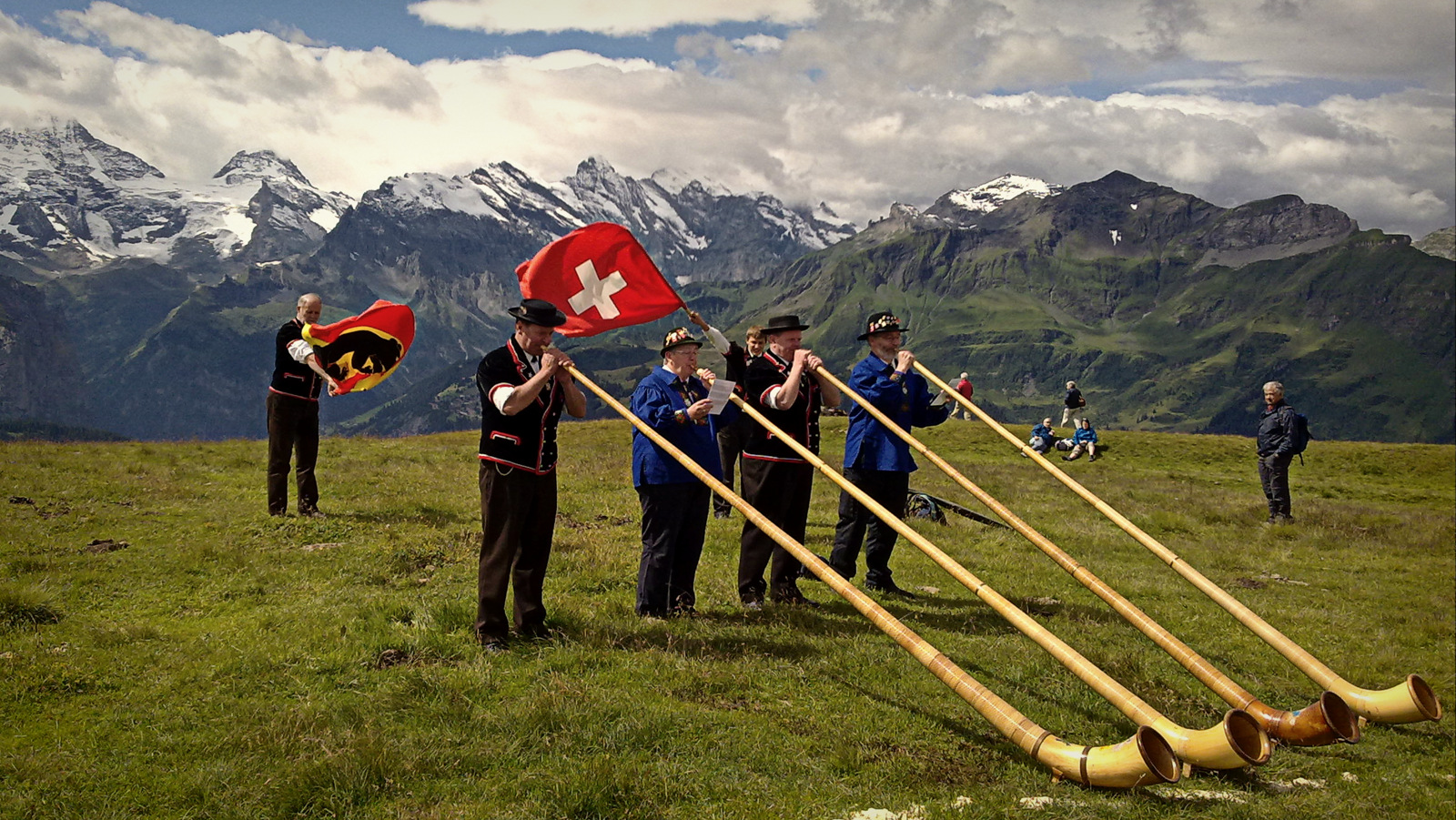
Grindelwald Alphorn players

Among music composed for the alphorn:

- Concerto Grosso No. 1 (2013) for four alphorns and orchestra by Georg Friedrich Haas
- Sinfonia pastorale for corno pastoriccio in G (alphorn) and string orchestra (1755) by Leopold Mozart
- Concerto for alphorn and orchestra (1970) by Jean Daetwyler
- Concerto No. 2 for alphorn (with flute, string orchestra and percussion) (1983) by Daetwyler
- Dialogue with Nature for alphorn, flute, and orchestra by Daetwyler
- Super Alpen King for three alphorns and orchestra by Ghislain Muller (2001) VSP orkestra / Arkady Shilkloper, Renaud Leipp
- Concertino rustico (1977) by Ferenc Farkas
- Begegnung for three alphorns and concert band, by Kurt Gable.
- Säumerweg-Blues (audio played by Kurt Ott) among many compositions by Hans-Jürg Sommer, Alphorn Musik
- Messe for alphorn and choir by Franz Schüssele Alphorn-Center
- Erbauliche Studie für 12 Alphörner in Abwesenheit von Bergen by Mathias Rüegg (1998)
- Wolf Music: Tapio for alphorn and echoing instruments (2003) by R. Murray Schafer
- Le Berger fantaisiste for three alphorns and orchestra by Ghislain Muller, Arkady Shilkloper, Renaud Leipp, Serge Haessler, VSP orkestra (2001)
- Bob Downes & The Alphorn Brothers (2015) by Bob Downes Open Music (CD rec. 2004)
- Concerto for alphorn in F and orchestra by Daniel Schnyder (2004)
- Matterhorn (a prelude for alphorn and wind orchestra) by Robert Litton (2013)
- Alpine Trail for alphorn and orchestra by Arkady Shilkloper
- Alpine Sketch for alphorn and big band by Arkady Shilkloper
- Lai nair for alphorn and contrabass by John Wolf Brennan (2015)
- Der Bergschuh for alphorn and marching band by Daniel Schnyder
- Crested Butte Mountain for alphorn and wind band (or brass sextet, strings, or horn septet) by Arkady Shilkloper
- Robin for alphorn and wind band (big band) by Arkady Shilkloper
- Fanfare for four alphorns by Arkady Shilkloper
- Tanz der Kühe by Carlo Brunner/Lisa Stoll

== In popular culture ==
- The alphorn is prominently featured in advertisements for Ricola cough drops.

== See also ==
- Bucium, a type of alphorn used by mountain dwellers in Romania
- Didgeridoo, an instrument of Aboriginal Australian origins, traditionally made from a hollowed out eucalyptus tree trunk
- Erke, a similar instrument of Argentine Northwest
- Kuhreihen, a type of melody played on an alphorn
- Tiba, wind instrument made of wood or metal that originates in the Grisons canton; it was used by shepherds on alpine meadows in the Alps
- Tibetan horn, long trumpet or horn used in Tibetan Buddhist and Mongolian buddhist ceremonies
- Trembita, a Carpathian alpine horn made of wood
- Trutruca, wind instrument played mainly amongst the Mapuche people of Chile and Argentina; produces a sound that is loud and severe, with few tonal variations
