= Tiba, Burkina Faso =

Tiba
- Country: Burkina Faso
- Region: Centre-Est Region
- Province: Boulgou Province
- Department: Bittou Department

Population (2019)
  - Total: 1,647

Tiba is a town in the Bittou Department of Boulgou Province in south-eastern Burkina Faso.

Population
Year	Pop.	±%
1985	901	—
2006	1,409	+56.4%
2019	1,647	+16.9%
