= Sierre =

- Municipality
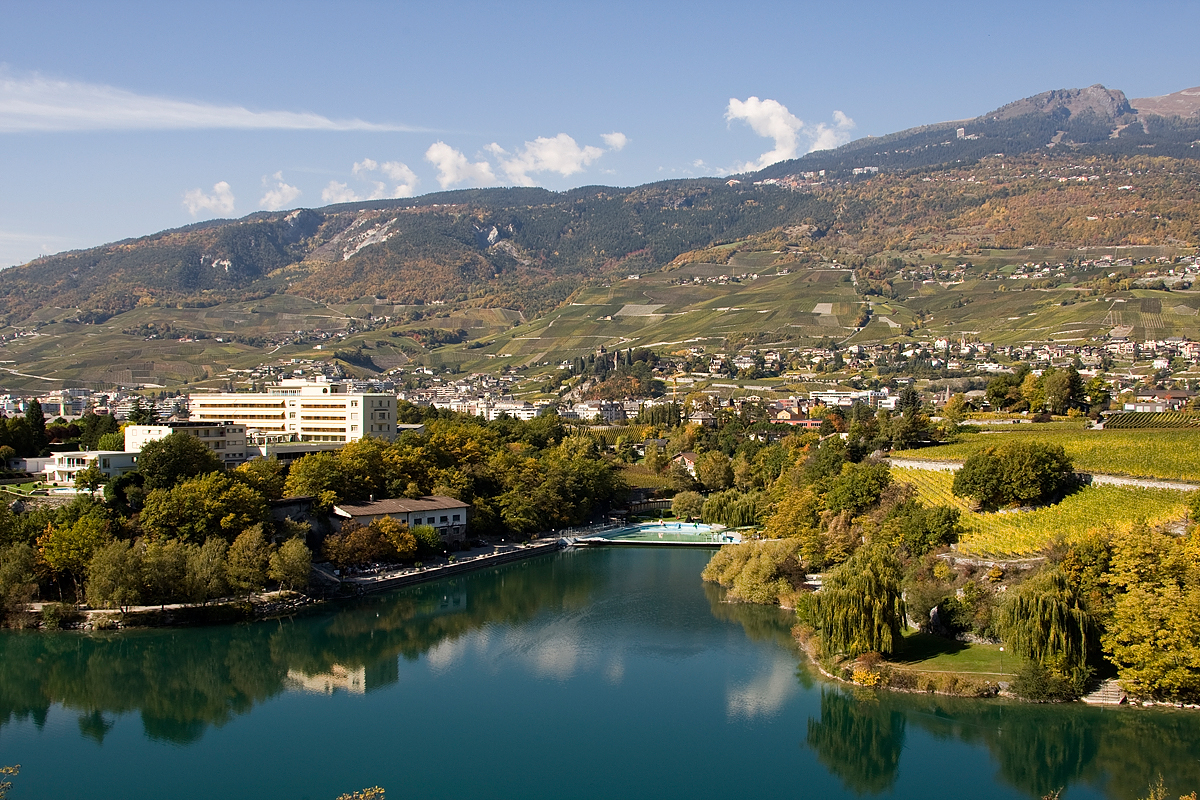

- Flag Coat of arms
- Location of Sierre
- Location within Switzerland Location within Canton of Valais
- Coordinates: 46°18′N 7°32′E
- Country: Switzerland
- Canton: Valais
- District: Sierre

Government
  - Mayor: Président (list); Pierre Berthod CVP/PDC (as of November 2016)

Area
  - Total: 19.2 km^{2} (7.4 sq mi)
- Elevation: 533 m (1,749 ft)

Population (December 2024)
  - Total: 18,020
  - Density: 939/km^{2} (2,430/sq mi)
- Time zone: UTC+01:00 (CET)
  - Summer (DST): UTC+02:00 (CEST)
- Postal code: 3960
- SFOS number: 6248
- ISO 3166 code: CH-VS
- Surrounded by: Chalais, Anniviers, Chermignon, Chippis, Grône, Lens, Montana, Randogne, Saint-Léonard, Salgesch, Venthône, Veyras
- Twin towns: Aubenas (France); Cesenatico (Italy); Delfzijl (Netherlands); Schwarzenbek (Germany); Zelzate (Belgium)
- Website: www.sierre.ch

Sierre (French pronunciation: [sjɛʁ]; German: Siders [ˈzidərs]; Arpitan: Siérro [ˈʃiʁo]) is the capital municipality of the district of Sierre, located in the Rhône valley in the canton of Valais, Switzerland. It has a population of 18,020. Sierre is nicknamed City of the Sun (French: Cité du Soleil) for its average of 300 days of sunshine a year.

It is the last official French-speaking city in Valais before the French–German language border of the canton located at the forêt de Finges, a few kilometres after the town. A German-speaking minority lives in Sierre, counting for around 8% of the population.

== History ==
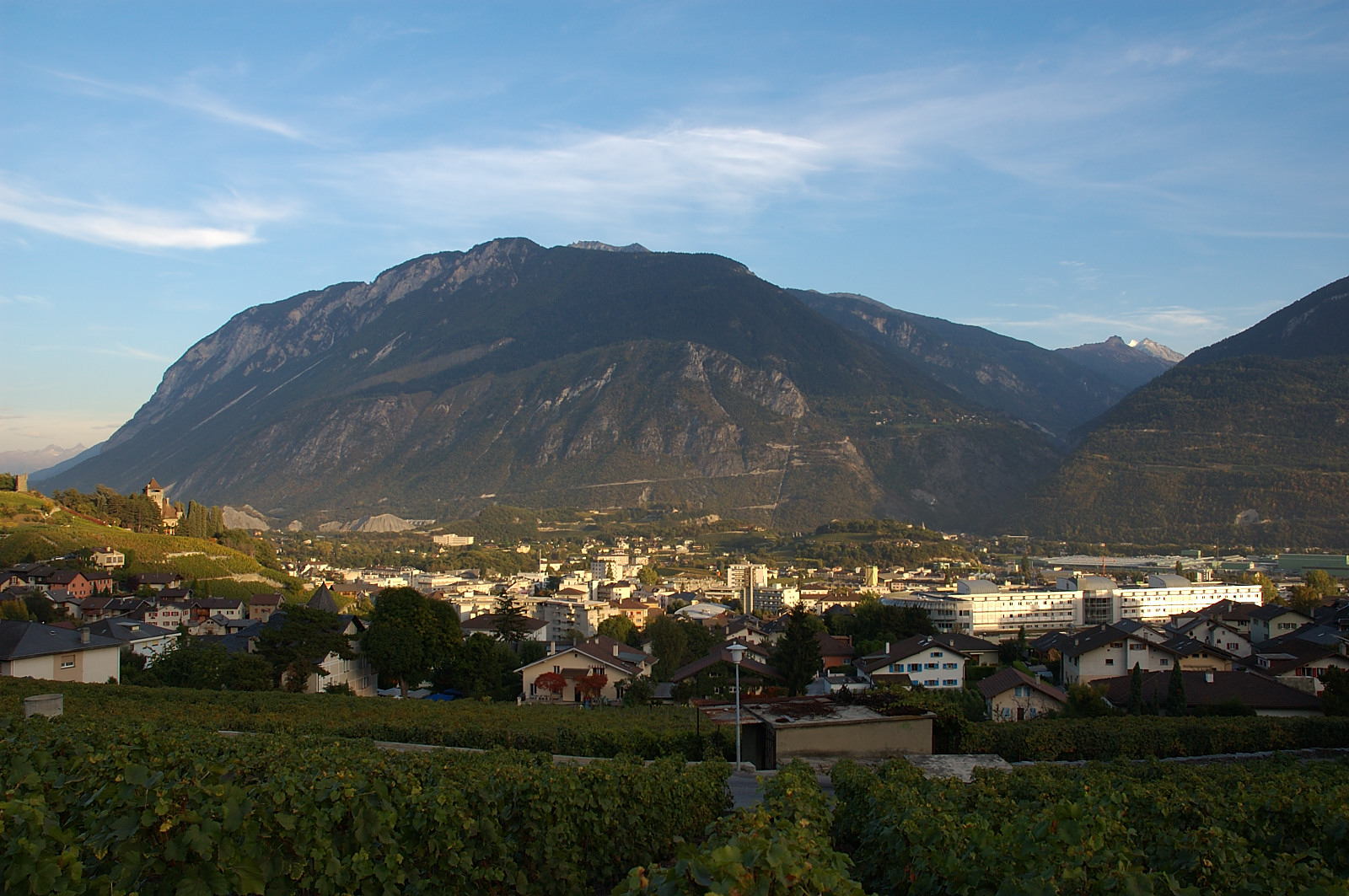
Panoramic view of Sierre.

Sierre was first mentioned around 800 as Sidrium, though a 12th-century document refers to the village being founded in 515. In 1179 it was mentioned as Sirro and in 1393 as Syder.

=== Prehistory ===
The area around the modern town, especially Gerunden hill, was settled very early. Archeological sites on the Gerunden hill have produced neolithic objects and grave goods (including a polished stone ax), Bronze Age weapons and jewelry, Early Iron Age objects, and Roman era inscriptions, jars, jewelry, and coins. A soapstone pot from the Early Middle Ages and a gold signet ring with the name Graifarius from the 6th century have also been found. Other sites on nearby hills and near the chapel of Saint-Ginier, the Château de Villa, the churches of Sainte-Croix, Grands-Prés, Muraz, Glarey and Bernunes have yielded up graves originating from the Bronze Age to the Carolingian era. In Grands-Prés there is a fire pit from the beginning of the Late Iron Age (5th–6th century BC).

During the Roman era it appears that there was no major population center, but rather several scattered groupings of separate, upper-class dwellings. Under the chapel of Saint-Ginier, the remains of a Roman-era house or estate have been discovered. Other Roman ruins have been found near the Château de Villa, in the church of Sainte-Croix (small terraced bath), in Grands-Prés by Muraz another house and in Gerunden the remains of buttress reinforced masonry indicate that a public or government building once stood there. Five altars were found in Saint-Ginier, along with another two in the scattered settlements, one of which was dedicated to Mercury. During the early imperial period, the duumvir or mayor of the Civitas Vallensium, Caius Cominus Chiu, lived in Sierre. In the late imperial period, the family of the senator of Vinelia Modestina also lived in the area.

The chapel of Saint-Félix was built in the 5th or the beginning of the 6th century on Gerunden hill.

=== Medieval and early modern developments ===
In 515 the estate at Sierre was given by the King of Burgundy Sigismund to the Abbey of Saint-Maurice to hold as a fief. By the 11th century, the fief of Sierre was owned by the Bishop of Sion. The aristocratic families and the residents of the fief lived on the Gerunden, Vieux-Sierre, and Plantzette hills. On each of these hills there was a castle that served as the residence for the Bishop's representatives and as a refuge for the population. The castles were razed in the mid-14th century when the noble families stood with the Bishop in his war with the Zenden of the Upper Valais and Counts of Savoy. The demolished castles and villages were abandoned and most residents settled farther north, in plan-Sierre. The only castle that survived the wars of the 14th century was Goubing Castle, southeast of Sierre, which belonged to the lords of Granges.

The Contrée of Sierre was originally a group that managed the commons. As vassals of the Bishop, they had the right to assemble twice a year to regulate the management of the common lands and the affairs of the local police. In the 14th and 15th centuries, this cooperative adopted a larger political role as they started to administer more of the daily affairs in the villages and acquired the right to appoint their own judges. Eventually, this grew into the Noble Contrée which then formed the core of Sierre Zenden from which the city of Sierre later developed. The town of Plan-Sierre soon took over the leadership role in the Noble Contrée. Until 1798, the Noble Contrée was appointed by a council of village representatives, under the leadership of the Bishop's representative. In 1559, Plan-Sierre divided into four quarters: Villa, Monderèche, La Salla, and Glarey. In 1620, the town hall was built.

=== 19th century ===
Aerial view (1949)

As the capital of a Zenden, Sierre fought the French in the 1798–99 invasion. In 1799, the city was occupied by French and Vaudois troops. The French set up their headquarters in Sierre.

In the conflicts between the conservative Upper Valais and the liberal Lower Valais, Sierre served as the seat of government in 1839–40. After 1848, the villages of the Noble Contrée became municipalities under the Valais cantonal constitution. The Zenden of Sierre became the District of Sierre with Sierre as the capital. The new city executive council had nine members, while of the General Council (legislature) had 60. Initially, the majority of the power was held by the Conservatives (now the Christian Democrats). In 1913, they were joined by the Liberals, in 1945 the Social Democrats, and in 2004 the Greens.

=== Modern Sierre ===
At the beginning of the 20th century, Sierre became economically important as aluminium smelting has been historically enabled by its access to hydroelectricity. Today the aluminium companies Novelis and Alcan employ 1,200 workers in Chippis and Sierre.

In 2007, the agglomeration of Sierre/Crans-Montana was formed to address created to common problems, especially in the fields of tourism and transportation.

== Geography ==
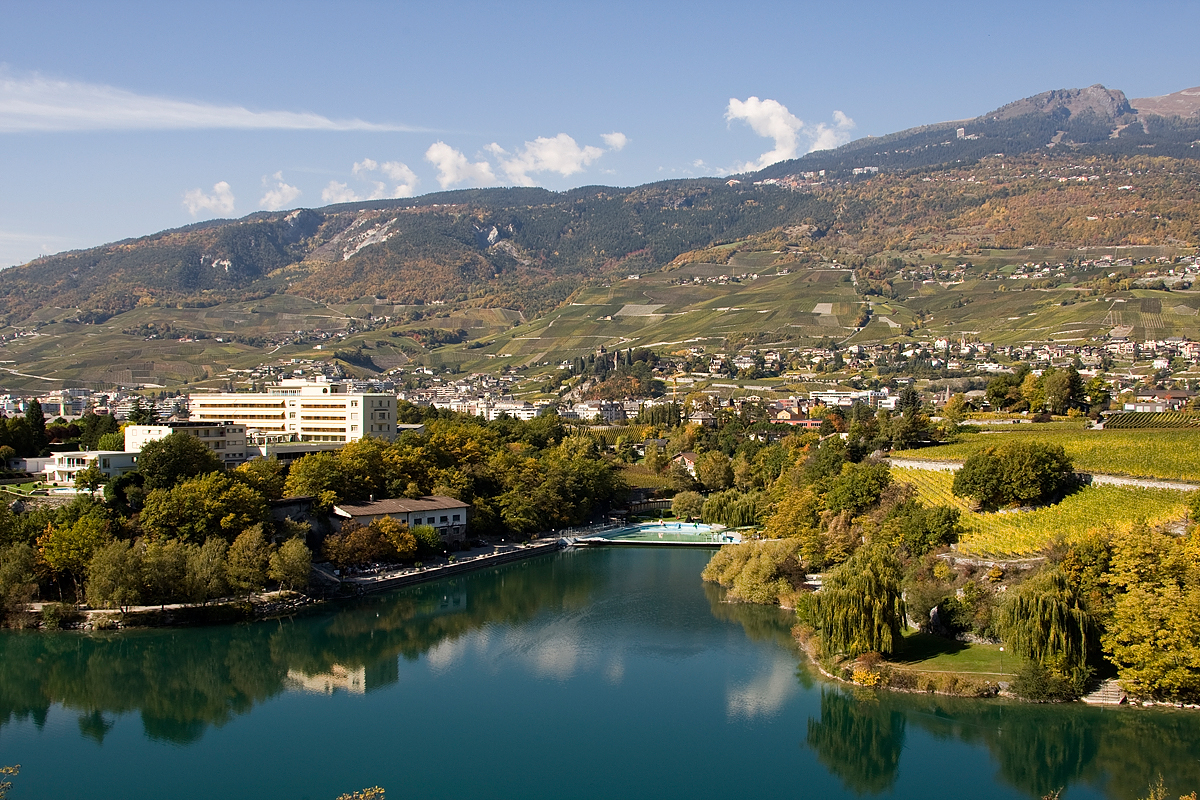
Lac de Géronde and Sierre

Sierre has an area, as of 2009, of 19.2 square kilometers (7.4 mi^{2}). Of this area, 6.61 km^{2} (2.55 mi^{2}) or 34.5% is used for agricultural purposes, while 4.1 km^{2} (1.6 mi^{2}) or 21.4% is forested. Of the rest of the land, 6.6 km^{2} (2.5 mi^{2}) or 34.4% is settled (buildings or roads), 1.31 km^{2} (0.51 mi^{2}) or 6.8% is either rivers or lakes and 0.6 km^{2} (0.23 mi^{2}) or 3.1% is unproductive land.

Of the built-up area, industrial buildings made up 5.4% of the total area while housing and buildings made up 10.3% and transportation infrastructure made up 10.3%. Power and water infrastructure as well as other special developed areas made up 4.0% of the area while parks, green belts and sports fields made up 4.4%. Out of the forested land, 18.7% of the total land area is heavily forested and 2.7% is covered with orchards or small clusters of trees. Of the agricultural land, 6.9% is used for growing crops and 2.5% is pastures, while 25.1% is used for orchards or vine crops. Of the water in the municipality, 1.3% is in lakes and 5.5% is in rivers and streams.

The municipality is the capital of the Sierre district. It is located in the middle Rhône valley, on the right bank of the river. The nearby Raspille mountain stream is considered the dividing line between the French and German-speaking portions of Switzerland. It consists of the city of Sierre, the villages of Granges, Noës and Muraz, and the hamlets and settlements of Gerunden, Plantzette, Vieux-Sierre, Bourg, Glarey, Borzuat, Zervettaz, Villa d'en Bas, d'en Haut, Sous Géronde, Cuchon, and Monderèche.

Sierre is a starting point for the tourist sites of the Val d'Anniviers, comprising the villages of Vercorin, Chandolin, St-Luc Vissoie, St-Jean Chandolin, Grimentz, Zinal, and Ayer. Sierre is connected with Crans-Montana by a funicular railway.

Lac de Géronde is a small lake on its outskirts.

The hilly topography of the valley floor derives from a very large postglacial rock avalanche, which collapsed from a fractured scar high to the north.

== Coat of arms ==
The blazon of the municipal coat of arms is Gules, a Sun in Splendour Or. The coat of arms is depicted (uncolorised) in the Schalbetter map (printed in 1545 by Sebastian Münster, Basel).

== Demographics ==
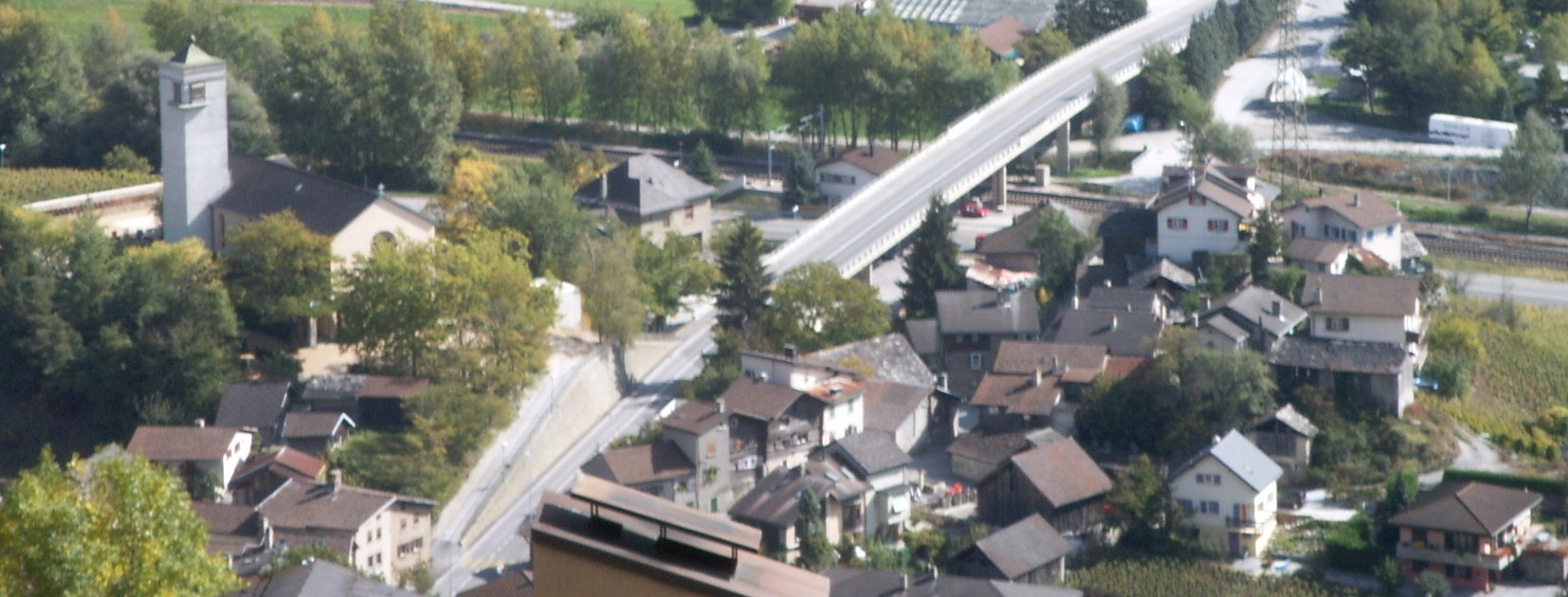
Noës village

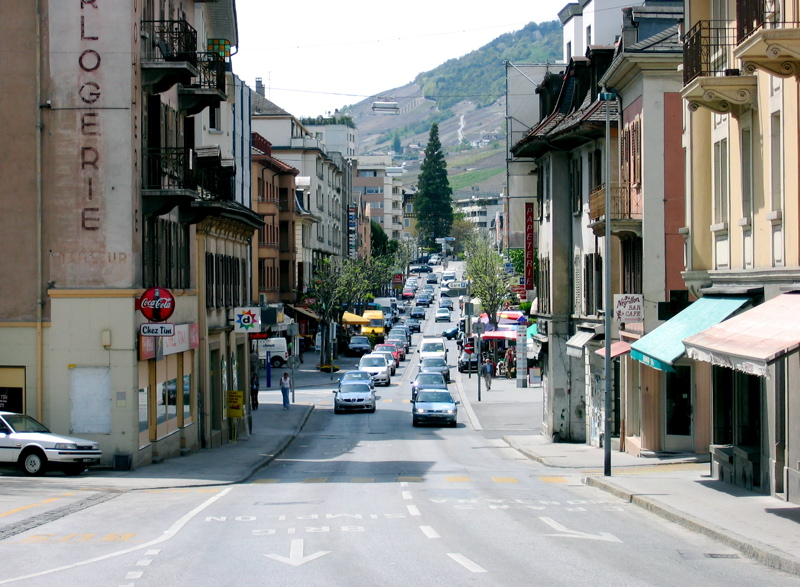
Avenue General Guisan in Sierre

Sierre has a population (as of December 2020) of 16,819. As of 2008, 27.0% of the population are resident foreign nationals. Over the last 10 years (2000–2010) the population has changed at a rate of 12.3%. It has changed at a rate of 11.9% due to migration and at a rate of 0% due to births and deaths.

Most of the population (as of 2000) speaks French (10,710 or 74.8%) as their first language, German is the second most common (1,803 or 12.6%) and Italian is the third (765 or 5.3%). There are 6 people who speak Romansh.

As of 2008, the population was 48.4% male and 51.6% female. The population was made up of 5,339 Swiss men (33.8% of the population) and 2,305 (14.6%) non-Swiss men. There were 6,123 Swiss women (38.8%) and 2,020 (12.8%) non-Swiss women. Of the population in the municipality, 5,363 or about 37.5% were born in Sierre and lived there in 2000. There were 3,705 or 25.9% who were born in the same canton, while 1,412 or 9.9% were born somewhere else in Switzerland, and 3,273 or 22.9% were born outside of Switzerland.

As of 2000, children and teenagers (0–19 years old) make up 22% of the population, while adults (20–64 years old) make up 61.9% and seniors (over 64 years old) make up 16.1%.

As of 2000, there were 5,651 people who were single and never married in the municipality. There were 6,891 married individuals, 974 widows or widowers and 801 individuals who are divorced.

As of 2000, there were 6,016 private households in the municipality, and an average of 2.3 persons per household. There were 2,133 households that consist of only one person and 319 households with five or more people. In 2000, a total of 5,728 apartments (84.1% of the total) were permanently occupied, while 875 apartments (12.9%) were seasonally occupied and 205 apartments (3.0%) were empty. As of 2009, the construction rate of new housing units was 3.4 new units per 1,000 residents. The vacancy rate for the municipality, in 2010, was 1.15%.

The historical population is given in the following chart:

== Heritage sites of national significance ==
The Centrale Électrique et Bâtiments Alusuisse (Power station and buildings of the Alusuisse company) is listed as a Swiss heritage site of national significance. The entire Sierre town and surrounding are part of the Inventory of Swiss Heritage Sites.

=== Sights ===
Sierre is host to a local wine museum (Musée Valaisan de la Vigne et du Vin) and of a museum dedicated to the memory of Rainer Maria Rilke who lived there until his death and is buried in the nearby town of Raron.

== Twin towns ==
Sierre is twinned with the towns of

Aubenas, France; Cesenatico, Italy	Delfzijl, Netherlands; Schwarzenbek, Germany	Zelzate, Belgium

== Politics ==
In the 2007 federal election the most popular party was the CVP which received 34.23% of the vote. The next three most popular parties were the SP (19.19%), the FDP (17.78%) and the SVP (16.92%). In the federal election, a total of 5,203 votes were cast, and the voter turnout was 57.3%.

In the 2009 Conseil d'Etat/Staatsrat election a total of 4,904 votes were cast, of which 330 or about 6.7% were invalid. The voter participation was 54.4%, which is similar to the cantonal average of 54.67%. In the 2007 Swiss Council of States election a total of 5,130 votes were cast, of which 498 or about 9.7% were invalid. The voter participation was 57.4%, which is similar to the cantonal average of 59.88%.

== Economy ==
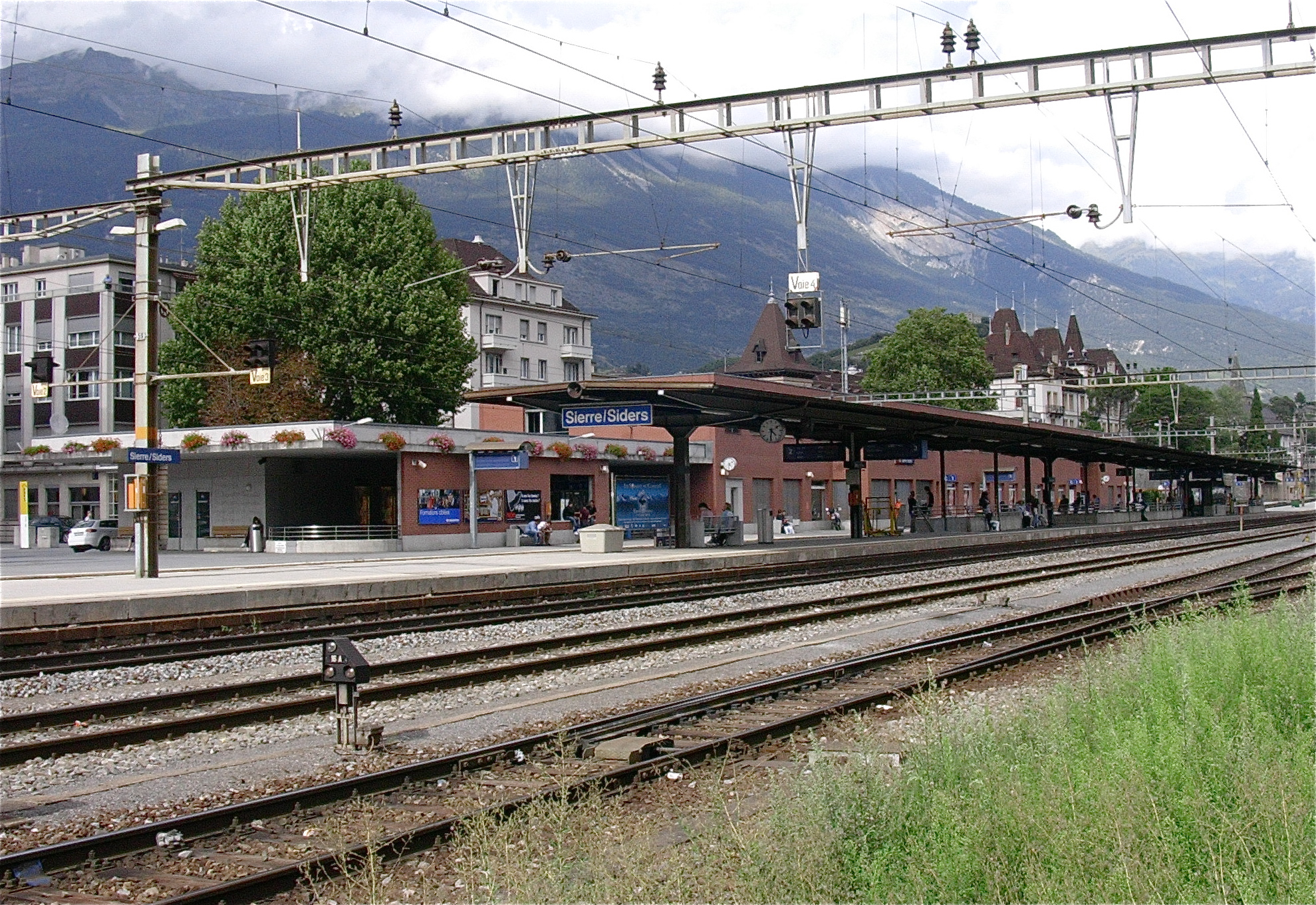
Sierre railway station

As of 2010, Sierre had an unemployment rate of 5%. As of 2008, there were 195 people employed in the primary economic sector and about 62 businesses involved in this sector. 2,654 people were employed in the secondary sector and there were 145 businesses in this sector. 6,607 people were employed in the tertiary sector, with 729 businesses in this sector. There were 6,938 residents of the municipality who were employed in some capacity, of which females made up 43.6% of the workforce.

In 2008 the total number of full-time equivalent jobs was 7,876. The number of jobs in the primary sector was 134, of which 118 were in agriculture and 16 were in forestry or lumber production. The number of jobs in the secondary sector was 2,570 of which 1,834 or (71.4%) were in manufacturing, 13 or (0.5%) were in mining and 584 (22.7%) were in construction. The number of jobs in the tertiary sector was 5,172. In the tertiary sector; 1,373 or 26.5% were in wholesale or retail sales or the repair of motor vehicles, 224 or 4.3% were in the movement and storage of goods, 401 or 7.8% were in a hotel or restaurant, 255 or 4.9% were in the information industry, 104 or 2.0% were the insurance or financial industry, 414 or 8.0% were technical professionals or scientists, 300 or 5.8% were in education and 1,194 or 23.1% were in health care.

In 2000, there were 4,257 workers who commuted into the municipality and 2,470 workers who commuted away. The municipality is a net importer of workers, with about 1.7 workers entering the municipality for every one leaving. Of the working population, 10.4% used public transportation to get to work, and 63% used a private car.

Sierre has a long history of winemaking and is home to the Rèze grape used to produce the sherry-style Swiss wine Vin des glaciers.

== Religion ==
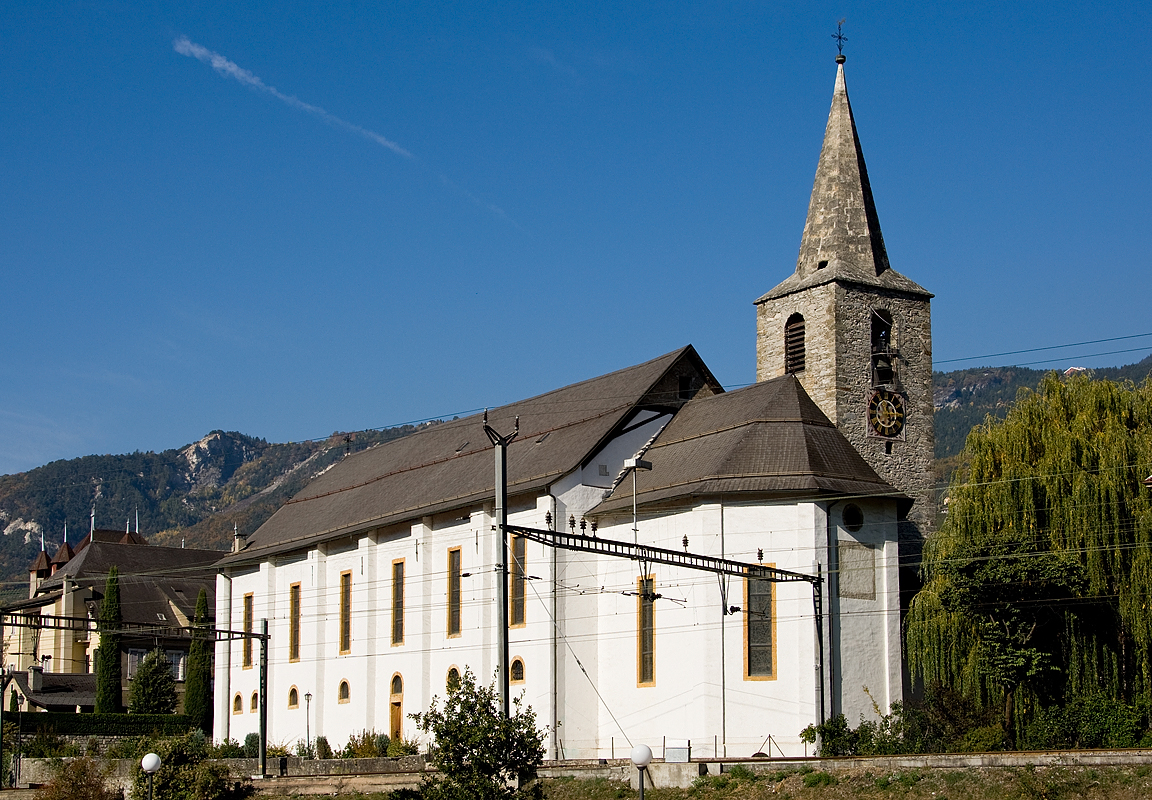
St. Catherine's church in Sierre

From the 2000 census, 11,139 or 77.8% were Roman Catholic, while 715 or 5.0% belonged to the Swiss Reformed Church. Of the rest of the population, there were 359 members of an Orthodox church (or about 2.51% of the population), there were 3 individuals (or about 0.02% of the population) who belonged to the Christian Catholic Church, and there were 310 individuals (or about 2.17% of the population) who belonged to another Christian church. There were 5 individuals (or about 0.03% of the population) who were Jewish, and 430 (or about 3.00% of the population) who were Islamic. There were 31 individuals who were Buddhist, 8 individuals who were Hindu, and 25 individuals who belonged to another church. 636 (or about 4.44% of the population) belonged to no church, are agnostic or atheist, and 805 individuals (or about 5.62% of the population) did not answer the question.

== Weather ==
Sierre has an average of 87.2 days of rain or snow per year and on average receives 657 mm (25.9 in) of precipitation. The wettest month is December during which time Sierre receives an average of 72 mm (2.8 in) of rain or snow. During this month there is precipitation for an average of 7.9 days. The month with the most days of precipitation is August, with an average of 8.4, but with only 58 mm (2.3 in) of rain or snow. The driest month of the year is September with an average of 37 mm (1.5 in) of precipitation over 5.7 days.

== Education ==
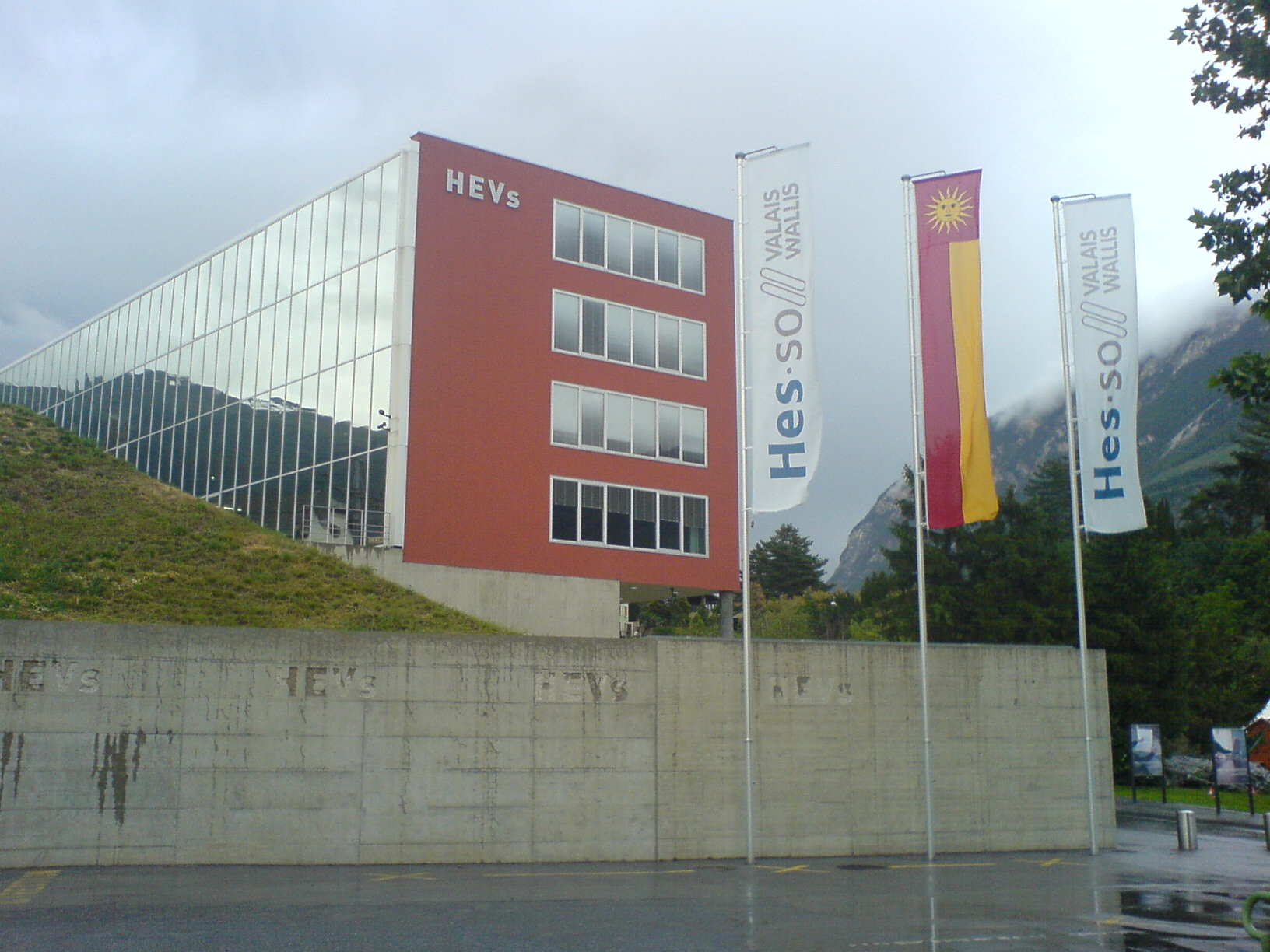
HEVs School in Sierre

In Sierre about 4,610 or (32.2%) of the population have completed non-mandatory upper secondary education, and 1,576 or (11.0%) have completed additional higher education (either university or a Fachhochschule). Of the 1,576 who completed tertiary schooling, 58.1% were Swiss men, 28.0% were Swiss women, 7.6% were non-Swiss men and 6.3% were non-Swiss women.

During the 2010–2011 school year there were a total of 149 students in the Sierre school system. The education system in the Canton of Valais allows young children to attend one year of non-obligatory Kindergarten. During that school year, there 2 kindergarten classes (KG1 or KG2) and 31 kindergarten students. The canton's school system requires students to attend six years of primary school. In Sierre there were a total of 8 classes and 149 students in the primary school. The secondary school program consists of three lower, obligatory years of schooling (orientation classes), followed by three to five years of optional, advanced schools. All the lower and upper secondary students from Sierre attend their school in a neighboring municipality.

As of 2000, there were 1,077 students in Sierre who came from another municipality, while 517 residents attended schools outside the municipality.

Sierre is home to the Bibliothèque et Médiathèque Sierre library. The library has (as of 2008) 65,898 books or other media, and loaned out 92,412 items in the same year. It was open for a total of 295 days, with an average of 26 hours per week during that year.

== Sport ==
HC Sierre has played in the Swiss League (SL) since 2019, the second tier of Swiss ice hockey, following a few years in the amateur leagues after a bankruptcy. The team currently plays its home games in the 4,500-seat Graben Arena but plans to move into the future 6,500-seat Valais Arena in the coming years.

== Events ==
- Free week of film screenings at the Cinéma du Bourg during DreamAgo Screenwriting Workshop (early May)
- Festival Week-end au bord de l'eau (late June or early July)
- Sierre Blues Festival (in August)

== Notable people ==
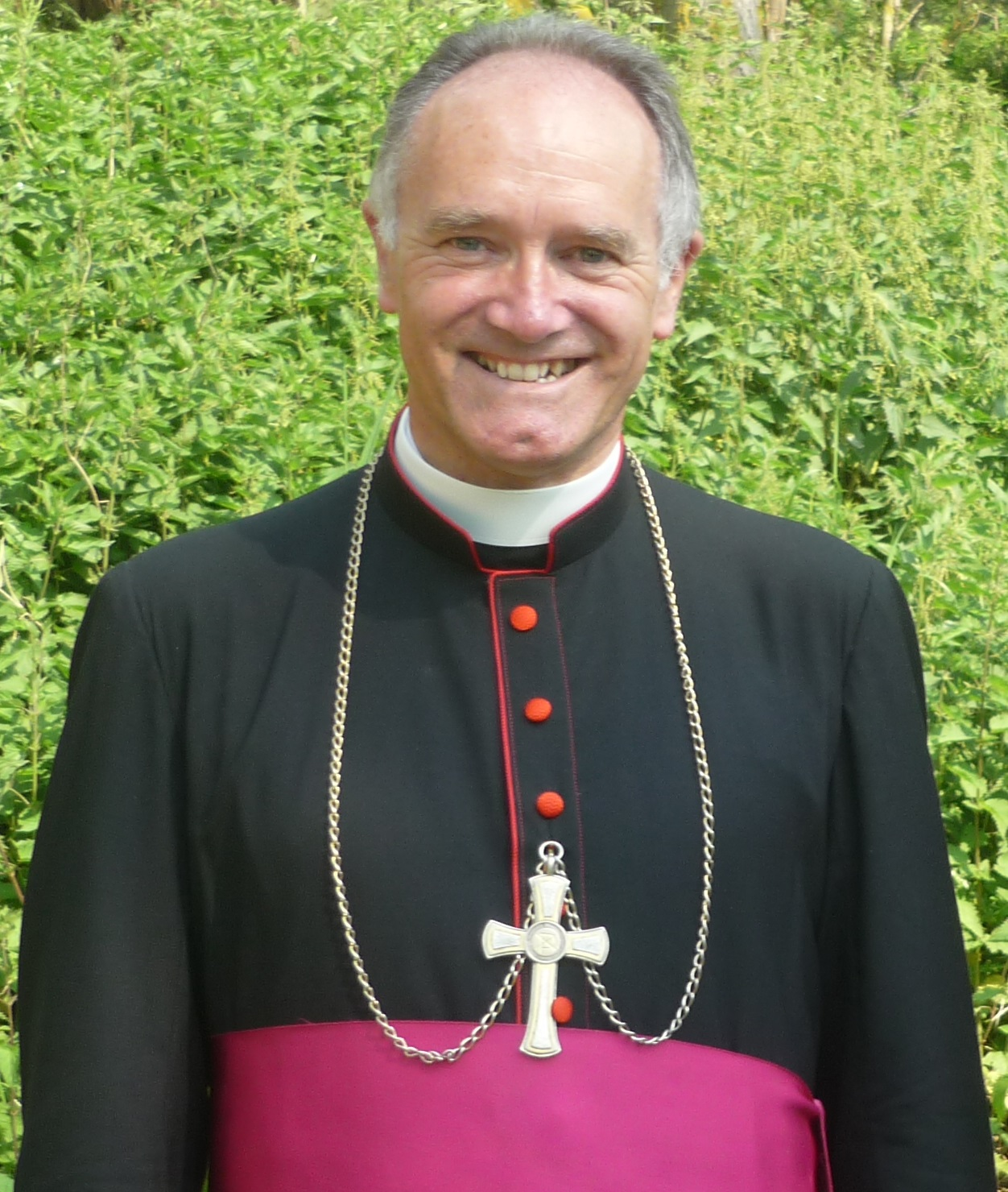
Bernard Fellay, 2012)

- Princess Henriette of Belgium (1870 – 1948 in Sierre), sportswoman and the best shot among royal women
- Eugénie Caps, (1892–1931 in Sierre), founder of the Congregation of the Missionary Sisters of the Holy Spirit
- Rudolf Kassner (1873 – 1959 in Sierre), an Austrian writer, essayist, translator and cultural philosopher
- Edmond Bille (1878 – 1959 in Sierre), painter, engraver, stained glass artist, journalist and politician
- Jean Daetwyler (1907 – 1994 in Sierre), Alphorn composer
- S. Corinna Bille (1912 – 1979 in Sierre), a French-speaking writer, brought up in Sierre
- André Perraudin (1914 - 2003 in Sierre), a Swiss Catholic Archbishop, lived in Rwanda for 50 years
- Jean-Noël Rey (1949–2016), politician, member of the National Council of Switzerland 2003–2007
- Bernard Fellay SSPX (born 1958 in Sierre), a Swiss Roman Catholic bishop
- Claude Barras (born 1973 in Sierre), a Swiss film director
- Hans-Peter Pfammatter (born 1974 in Sierre), a Swiss jazz pianist and composer
- Vincent Gessler (born 1976 in Sierre), a Swiss science fiction author

Sport

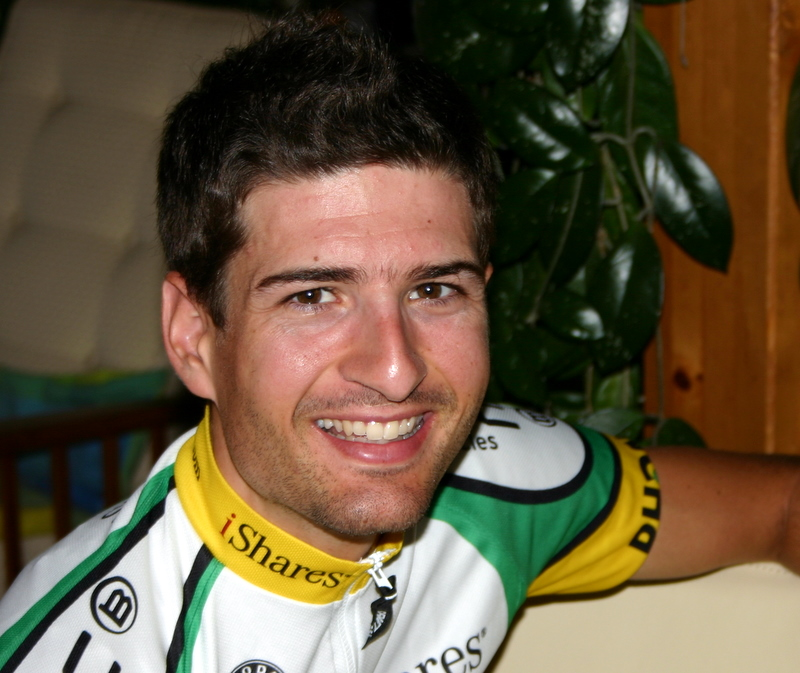
Johann Tschopp, 2006

- Jacques Plante (1929–1986), a Canadian professional hockey player, the first goaltender to wear a mask while playing in the NHL, buried in Sierre
- Jean-Yves Rey (born 1970 in Sierre), a Swiss ski mountaineer and long-distance runner
- Alexandre Moos (born 1972 in Sierre), a Swiss professional mountain biker
- Stephane Grichting (born 1979 in Sierre), a retired footballer, 463 club caps and 45 for Switzerland
- Johann Tschopp (born 1982 in Sierre), a Swiss professional mountain bike racer
