= Tiba (instrument) =

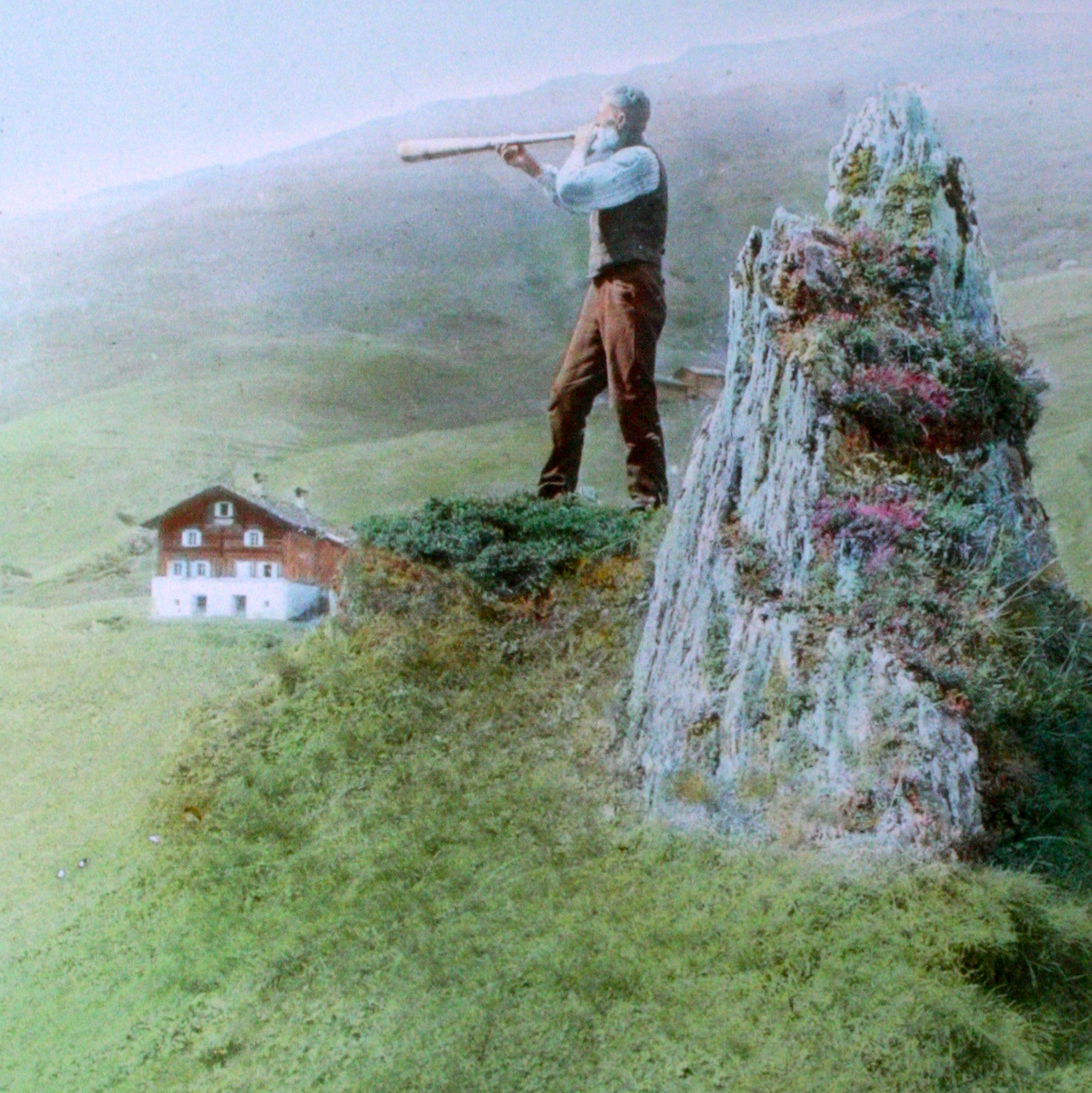
Tiba playing shepherd in the Safien valley

Tiba is a wind instrument made of wood or metal that originates in the Grisons canton in Switzerland. It was used by shepherds on alpine meadows in the Alps.

== Exhibition ==
The Regional Museum of Surselva held until the end of March 2011 the exhibition "Tiba Tones", showing the 50+ Tibas made of different materials. Numerous people from the region showed their tibas, which were stored in alpine huts, at the museum's request.
